= List of IndyCar fatalities =

This article lists the people who have been fatally injured in American Championship car racing during testing, practice, qualifying, or races since 1916, categorized into drivers, riding mechanics, and non-participants. The lists recognize "IndyCar" or "Champ Car" fatalities that have occurred in events making up the National Championship, which has been held by the following sanctioning bodies:

- American Automobile Association (1916, 1920–1941, 1946–1955)
- United States Auto Club (1956–1995)
- Championship Auto Racing Teams (1979–2003)
- Open Wheel Racing Series/Champ Car (2004–2007)
- Indy Racing League/IndyCar (since 1996)

The National Championship, which was split from 1979 to 2007, has featured regular races, non-points paying (non-championship) rounds, competitions sanctioned by entities that did not stage the National Championship in the same year (such as the Automobile Club of America), and the AAA Big car meetings held in the 1946 season.

The most recent driver to be fatally injured in an IndyCar Series event was Justin Wilson at the 2015 ABC Supply 500.

== Driver fatalities ==
Driver	Date of incident	Sanction	Track (Note: The name of the track at the time of the fatal incident is displayed.)	Event	Team/Owner	Car/Entry	Session
Bob Burman (USA)	April 8, 1916	AAA	Grand Boulevard (Corona)	Corona Grand Prize (Note: Non-championship event)		Peugeot	Race
Carl Limberg (USA)	May 13, 1916	AAA	Sheepshead Bay Speedway	Metropolitan Trophy		Delage	Race
Jack Peacock (USA)	August 27, 1916	AAA	Recreation Park (Kalamazoo)	100-mile race		Sunbeam	Race (Note: The race was abandoned and voided after the fatal crash.)
Lewis Jackson (USA)	November 18, 1916	AAA	Santa Monica Road Race Course	American Grand Prize		Marmon	Race
Frank Galvin (USA) (Note: Galvin died on December 4, 1916, two days after his crash.)	December 2, 1916	AAA	Uniontown Speedway	Universal Trophy		Premier	Race
Gaston Chevrolet (USA)	November 25, 1920	AAA	Beverly Hills Speedway	250-mile race		Frontenac	Race
Eddie O'Donnell (USA) (Note: O'Donnell died on November 26, 1920, the day after his crash.)	November 25, 1920	AAA	Beverly Hills Speedway	250-mile race		Duesenberg	Race
Alton Soules (USA)	October 1, 1921	AAA	Fresno Speedway	San Joaquin Valley Classic		Frontenac	Race
Roscoe Sarles (USA)	September 17, 1922	AAA	Kansas City Speedway	300-mile race	Cliff Durant	Miller	Race
Howdy Wilcox (USA)	September 4, 1923	AAA	Altoona Speedway	200-mile race		Duesenberg	Race
Joe Boyer (USA) (Note: Boyer died on September 2, 1924, the day after his crash.)	September 1, 1924	AAA	Altoona Speedway	Fall Classic		Duesenberg – Duesenberg SC	Race
Jimmy Murphy (USA)	September 15, 1924	AAA	New York State Fairgrounds	150-mile race		Miller	Race
Ernie Ansterburg (USA)	October 16, 1924	AAA	Charlotte Speedway	250-mile race		Duesenberg	Practice
Fred Wells (USA)	April 22, 1925		Long Island Motor Parkway	Private test	Fred Wells	Wells's Hornet	Testing
Ray Cariens (USA) (Note: Cariens died on December 1, 1925, two days after his crash.)	November 29, 1925	AAA	Culver City Speedway	250-mile race	T. W. Milton	Miller – Miller SC	Race
Herbert Jones (USA) (Note: Jones died on May 28, 1926, the day after his crash.)	May 27, 1926	AAA	Indianapolis Motor Speedway	Indianapolis 500	Al Cotey	Miller – Miller SC "Elcar"	Qualifying
Jack Foley (UK)	July 4, 1926	AAA	Rockingham Speedway	Independence Day Sweepstakes	Jack La Cain	Duesenberg	Qualifying
Fred Comer (USA)	October 12, 1928	AAA	Rockingham Speedway	International Motor Classic	Mike Boyle	Miller FD – Miller SC "Boyle Valve"	Race
Bill Spence (USA)	May 30, 1929	AAA	Indianapolis Motor Speedway	Indianapolis 500	August Duesenberg	Duesenberg – Duesenberg SC	Race
Ray Keech (USA)	June 15, 1929	AAA	Altoona Speedway	200-mile race	M. A. Yagle	Miller – Miller SC "Simplex Piston Ring"	Race
Joe Caccia (USA)	May 26, 1931	AAA	Indianapolis Motor Speedway	Indianapolis 500	Alvin Jones	Duesenberg "Jones & Maley"	Practice
Jimmy Gleason (USA)	September 12, 1931	AAA	New York State Fairgrounds	100-mile race	Denny Duesenberg	Duesenberg	Qualifying
Milton Jones (USA)	May 27, 1932	AAA	Indianapolis Motor Speedway	Indianapolis 500	Milton Jones	Miller	Practice
Bill Denver (USA)	May 28, 1933	AAA	Indianapolis Motor Speedway	Indianapolis 500	Ray Brady	Brady – Studebaker "Brady & Nardi"	Qualifying
Mark Billman (USA)	May 30, 1933	AAA	Indianapolis Motor Speedway	Indianapolis 500	James Kemp	Buehrig-Duesenberg "Kemp-Mannix"	Race
Lester Spangler (USA)	May 30, 1933	AAA	Indianapolis Motor Speedway	Indianapolis 500	Harry Hartz	Miller	Race
Pete Kreis (USA)	May 25, 1934	AAA	Indianapolis Motor Speedway	Indianapolis 500	Harry Hartz	Miller FD – Miller "Miller-Hartz"	Practice
George Brayen (USA)	September 9, 1934	AAA	New York State Fairgrounds	100-mile race	George Simmons	Oakland "Simmons"	Race
Johnny Hannon (USA)	May 21, 1935	AAA	Indianapolis Motor Speedway	Indianapolis 500	Leon Duray	Stevens – Miller "Bowes Seal Fast"	Practice
Stubby Stubblefield (USA)	May 21, 1935	AAA	Indianapolis Motor Speedway	Indianapolis 500	Phil Shafer	Shafer – Buick "Victor Gasket"	Qualifying
Clay Weatherly (USA)	May 30, 1935	AAA	Indianapolis Motor Speedway	Indianapolis 500	Leon Duray	Stevens – Miller "Bowes Seal Fast"	Race
Al Gordon (USA)	January 26, 1936	AAA	Ascot Speedway	125-mile race	Bill White	Wetteroth – Offenhauser	Race
Billy Winn (USA)	August 20, 1938	AAA	Illinois State Fairgrounds	100-mile race	Lion Oil	Schrader-Miller	Race
Floyd Roberts (USA)	May 30, 1939	AAA	Indianapolis Motor Speedway	Indianapolis 500	Lou Moore	Wetteroth – Offenhauser "Burd Piston Ring"	Race
George Bailey (USA)	May 7, 1940	AAA	Indianapolis Motor Speedway	Indianapolis 500	Gulf Oil	Miller RE4D – Miller SC "Gulf-Miller"	Practice
Lou Webb (USA)	September 2, 1940	AAA	New York State Fairgrounds	100-mile race	Joe Marks	Marks – Offenhauser	Race
Mitchell Siemienski (USA)	June 22, 1941	AAA	Langhorne Speedway	100-mile race	Herman Hoppe	Hoppe – Riley	Qualifying
Joseph Hrycenko (USA)	April 14, 1946	AAA	Williams Grove Speedway	10-lap Big car race	Julius Furslew	Furslew-Riley	Heat race
Bumpy Bumpus (USA)	June 16, 1946	AAA	Flemington Fair Speedway	Big car race	Bumpy Bumpus	Bagley – Hal DO "Burd Piston Ring"	Heat race
Bus Wilbert (USA)	August 11, 1946	AAA	Funk's Speedway	20-lap Big car race	Charles Engle	Engle- Offenhauser	Race
George Robson (USA)	September 2, 1946	AAA	Lakewood Park	100-mile race	Cliff Bergere	Wetteroth – Offenhauser "Noc-Out Hose Clamp"	Race
George Barringer (USA)	September 2, 1946	AAA	Lakewood Park	100-mile race	Ervin Wolfe	Shaw – Offenhauser "Wolfe-Tulsa"	Race
Al Putnam (USA)	September 15, 1946	AAA	Indiana State Fairgrounds	100-mile race	Richard Palmer	Stevens – Offenhauser	Qualifying
Shorty Cantlon (USA)	May 30, 1947	AAA	Indianapolis Motor Speedway	Indianapolis 500	Lou Rassey	Snowberger FD – Miller "Auto Shippers"	Race
Ralph Hepburn (USA)	May 16, 1948	AAA	Indianapolis Motor Speedway	Indianapolis 500	Lou Welch	Kurtis 2000 – Novi SC "Novi Grooved Piston"	Practice
Ted Horn (USA)	October 10, 1948	AAA	DuQuoin State Fairgrounds	100-mile race	Ted Horn Enterprises	Horn – Offenhauser	Race
George Metzler (USA) (Note: Metzler died on June 3, 1949, six days after his crash.)	May 28, 1949	AAA	Indianapolis Motor Speedway	Indianapolis 500	Lee Glessner	Shaw – Offenhauser	Practice
Bill Sheffler (USA) (Note: Sheffler died on June 28, 1949, nine days after his crash.)	June 19, 1949	AAA	New Jersey State Fairgrounds	100-mile race	Bill Sheffler	Bromme – Offenhauser	Practice
Rex Mays (USA)	November 6, 1949	AAA	Del Mar Fairgrounds	100-mile race	Ervin Wolfe	Kurtis 2000 – Offenhauser	Race
Walt Brown (USA)	July 29, 1951	AAA	Williams Grove Speedway	Indianapolis Sweepstakes	Jack Robbins	Wetteroth D – Offenhauser	Qualifying
Johnny McDowell (USA)	June 8, 1952	AAA	Wisconsin State Fair Park	Rex Mays Classic	Roger Wolcott	Kurtis Kraft – Offenhauser	Qualifying
Joe James (USA) (Note: James died on November 5, 1952, three days after his crash.)	November 2, 1952	AAA	Santa Clara County Fairgrounds	100-mile race	Bob Estes	Watson – Offenhauser	Race
Chet Miller (USA)	May 15, 1953	AAA	Indianapolis Motor Speedway	Indianapolis 500	Jean Marcenac	Kurtis FD – Novi SC "Novi Governor"	Practice
Carl Scarborough (USA) (Note: Having stopped in the pits, Scarborough died of heat exhaustion a little later.)	May 30, 1953	AAA	Indianapolis Motor Speedway	Indianapolis 500	Lee Elkins	Kurtis Kraft/Wetteroth D – Offenhauser "McNamara"	Race
Bob Scott (USA)	July 5, 1954	AAA	Darlington Raceway	Independence Day Sweepstakes	Ray Brady	Kurtis 4000 – Offenhauser	Race
Manny Ayulo (USA) (Note: Ayulo died on May 17, 1955, the day after his crash.)	May 16, 1955	AAA	Indianapolis Motor Speedway	Indianapolis 500	Peter Schmidt	Kurtis 500C – Offenhauser	Practice
Bill Vukovich (USA)	May 30, 1955	AAA	Indianapolis Motor Speedway	Indianapolis 500	Lindsey Hopkins	Kurtis 500C – Offenhauser	Race
Jack McGrath (USA)	November 6, 1955	AAA	Arizona State Fairgrounds	Bobby Ball Memorial	Jack Hinkle	Kurtis 4000 – Offenhauser	Race
Keith Andrews (USA)	May 15, 1957	USAC	Indianapolis Motor Speedway	Indianapolis 500	Giuseppe Farina	Kurtis 500G – Offenhauser	Practice
Pat O'Connor (USA)	May 30, 1958	USAC	Indianapolis Motor Speedway	Indianapolis 500	Chapman Root	Kurtis 500G – Offenhauser "Sumar"	Race
Art Bisch (USA) (Note: Bisch died on July 6, 1958, two days after his crash.)	July 4, 1958	USAC	Lakewood Speedway	100-mile race	Pete Salemi	Kuzma – Offenhauser "Central Excavating"	Race
Jimmy Reece (USA)	September 28, 1958	USAC	Trenton Speedway	100-mile race	George Bignotti	Kurtis 500G – Offenhauser "Bowes Seal Fast"	Race
Marshall Teague (USA)	February 11, 1959	USAC	Daytona International Speedway	Speed record attempt	Chapman Root	Kurtis 500D – Offenhauser "Sumar Streamliner" (Note: The Formula Libre-classified car featured streamlined fenders over the wheels and a canopy enclosing the driver.)	Testing
George Amick (USA)	April 4, 1959	USAC	Daytona International Speedway	Daytona 100	George Bignotti	Epperly – Offenhauser "Bowes Seal Fast"	Race
Dick Linder (USA)	April 19, 1959	USAC	Trenton Speedway	Race of Champions	Jake Vargo	Kurtis 4000D – Offenhauser	Race
Jerry Unser (USA) (Note: Unser died on May 17, 1959, fifteen days after his crash.)	May 2, 1959	USAC	Indianapolis Motor Speedway	Indianapolis 500	H. H. Johnson	Kuzma – Offenhauser "Helse"	Practice
Bob Cortner (USA)	May 19, 1959	USAC	Indianapolis Motor Speedway	Indianapolis 500	Cornis Engineering	Cornis – Offenhauser	Practice
Van Johnson (USA)	July 19, 1959	USAC	Williams Grove Speedway	Indianapolis Sweepstakes	Jake Vargo	Kurtis 4000D – Offenhauser	Race
Ed Elisian (USA)	August 30, 1959	USAC	Wisconsin State Fair Park	200-mile race	Ernest Ruiz	Christiansen – Offenhauser "Travelon Trailer"	Race
Jimmy Bryan (USA)	June 19, 1960	USAC	Langhorne Speedway	100-mile race	Leader Card	Watson – Offenhauser	Race
Tony Bettenhausen (USA)	May 12, 1961	USAC	Indianapolis Motor Speedway	Indianapolis 500	Doug Stearly	Watson – Offenhauser "Stearly Motor Freight"	Practice
Al Keller (USA)	November 19, 1961	USAC	Arizona State Fairgrounds	Bobby Ball Memorial	Bruce Homeyer	Phillips – Offenhauser "Konstant Hot"	Race
Hugh Randall (USA)	July 1, 1962	USAC	Langhorne Speedway	Langhorne 100	Jake Vargo	Kurtis 4000D – Offenhauser	Race
Eddie Sachs (USA)	May 30, 1964	USAC	Indianapolis Motor Speedway	Indianapolis 500	DVS	Halibrand Shrike – Ford "American Red Ball"	Race
Dave MacDonald (USA)	May 30, 1964	USAC	Indianapolis Motor Speedway	Indianapolis 500	Mickey Thompson	Thompson 63 – Ford "Sears Allstate"	Race
Bill Horstmeyer (USA)	August 22, 1964	USAC	Illinois State Fairgrounds	Tony Bettenhausen Memorial	Bill Horstmeyer	Kuzma – Offenhauser "M. A. H."	Race
Bobby Marshman (USA) (Note: Marshman died on December 3, 1964, six days after his crash.)	November 27, 1964		Phoenix International Raceway	Tire test	Lindsey Hopkins	Lotus 29 – Ford "Pure Oil Firebird"	Testing
Chuck Rodee (USA)	May 14, 1966	USAC	Indianapolis Motor Speedway	Indianapolis 500	Leader Card	Watson – Offenhauser "Wynn's"	Qualifying
Mike Spence (UK)	May 7, 1968	USAC	Indianapolis Motor Speedway	Indianapolis 500	STP	Lotus 56 – Pratt & Whitney Turbine "STP Oil Treatment"	Practice
Ronnie Duman (USA)	June 9, 1968	USAC	Wisconsin State Fair Park	Rex Mays Classic	Pete Salemi	Gerhardt – Offenhauser TC "Central Excavating"	Race
Jim Malloy (USA) (Note: Malloy died on May 18, 1972, four days after his crash.)	May 14, 1972	USAC	Indianapolis Motor Speedway	Indianapolis 500	Gerhardt Racing	Eagle – Offenhauser TC "Thermo King"	Practice
Bob Criss (USA)	March 12, 1973		FasTrack International Speedway	Private test	Page Racing	Eagle – Offenhauser TC	Testing
Art Pollard (USA)	May 12, 1973	USAC	Indianapolis Motor Speedway	Indianapolis 500	Bob Fletcher	Eagle – Offenhauser TC "Cobre Firestone"	Practice
Swede Savage (USA) (Note: Savage died on July 2, 1973, thirty-three days after his crash.)	May 30, 1973	USAC	Indianapolis Motor Speedway	Indianapolis 500	Patrick Racing	Eagle – Offenhauser TC "STP Oil Treatment"	Race
Gordon Smiley (USA)	May 15, 1982	USAC	Indianapolis Motor Speedway	Indianapolis 500	Bob Fletcher	March 81C – Cosworth	Qualifying
Jim Hickman (USA) (Note: Hickman died on August 1, 1982, the day after his crash.)	July 31, 1982	CART	Wisconsin State Fair Park	Provimi Veal Tony Bettenhausen 200	Rattlesnake Racing	March 81C – Cosworth	Practice
Jovy Marcelo (PHL)	May 15, 1992	USAC	Indianapolis Motor Speedway	Indianapolis 500	Euromotorsport	Lola T91/00 – Cosworth DFS	Practice
Scott Brayton (USA)	May 17, 1996	USAC	Indianapolis Motor Speedway	Indianapolis 500	Team Menard	Lola T95/00 – Menard V-6	Practice
Jeff Krosnoff (USA)	July 14, 1996	CART	Toronto street circuit	Molson Indy Toronto	Arciero-Wells Racing	Reynard 96I – Toyota	Race
Gonzalo Rodríguez (URY)	September 11, 1999	CART	Laguna Seca Raceway	Honda Grand Prix of Monterey	Team Penske	Lola B99/00 – Mercedes	Practice
Greg Moore (CAN)	October 31, 1999	CART	California Speedway	Marlboro 500	Forsythe Racing	Reynard 99I – Mercedes	Race
Tony Renna (USA)	October 22, 2003		Indianapolis Motor Speedway	Firestone tire test	Chip Ganassi Racing	G-Force – Toyota	Testing
Paul Dana (USA)	March 26, 2006	IRL	Homestead–Miami Speedway	Toyota Indy 300	Rahal Letterman Racing	Panoz – Honda	Practice
Dan Wheldon (UK)	October 16, 2011	IndyCar	Las Vegas Motor Speedway	IZOD IndyCar World Championship	Sam Schmidt Motorsports	Dallara IR-05 – Honda	Race
Justin Wilson (UK) (Note: Wilson died on August 24, 2015, the day after his crash.)	August 23, 2015	IndyCar	Pocono Raceway	ABC Supply 500	Andretti Autosport	Dallara DW12 – Honda	Race

=== Breakdown ===
Fatalities by track
Track (Note: The current, last, or best known name of the track is displayed.)	Total	First	Last
(Indiana) Indianapolis Motor Speedway	36	1926	2003
(New York (state)) New York State Fairgrounds	4	1924	1940
(Wisconsin) Milwaukee Mile	4	1952	1982
(Pennsylvania) Altoona Speedway	3	1923	1929
(Georgia (U.S. state)) Lakewood Speedway	3	1946	1958
(New Jersey) Trenton Speedway	3	1949	1959
(Pennsylvania) Williams Grove Speedway	3	1946	1959
(Pennsylvania) Langhorne Speedway	3	1941	1962
(California) Beverly Hills Speedway	2	1920	1920
(New Hampshire) Rockingham Speedway	2	1926	1928
(Florida) Daytona International Speedway	2	1959	1959
Arizona State Fairgrounds	2	1955	1961
Illinois State Fairgrounds	2	1938	1964
(Arizona) Phoenix Raceway	2	1964	1973
(California) Grand Boulevard (Corona)	1	1916	
(New York (state)) Sheepshead Bay Speedway	1	1916	
(Michigan) Recreation Park (Kalamazoo)	1	1916	
(California) Santa Monica Road Race Course	1	1916	
(Pennsylvania) Uniontown Speedway	1	1916	
(California) Fresno Speedway	1	1921	
(Missouri) Kansas City Speedway	1	1922	
(North Carolina) Charlotte Speedway	1	1924	
(New York (state)) Long Island Motor Parkway	1	1925	
(California) Culver City Speedway	1	1925	
(California) Legion Ascot Speedway	1	1936	
(New Jersey) Flemington Speedway	1	1946	
(Indiana) Winchester Speedway	1	1946	
Indiana State Fairgrounds	1	1946	
(Illinois) DuQuoin State Fairgrounds	1	1948	
(California) Del Mar Fairgrounds	1	1949	
(California) Santa Clara County Fairgrounds	1	1952	
(South Carolina) Darlington Raceway	1	1954	
(Ontario) Toronto street circuit	1	1996	
(California) Laguna Seca Raceway	1	1999	
(California) Auto Club Speedway	1	1999	
(Florida) Homestead–Miami Speedway	1	2006	
(Nevada) Las Vegas Motor Speedway	1	2011	
(Pennsylvania) Pocono Raceway	1	2015	

Fatalities by decade
Decade	Total
1910s	5
1920s	15
1930s	14
1940s	15
1950s	20
1960s	11
1970s	4
1980s	2
1990s	5
2000s	2
2010s	2
2020s	0
All	95

== Fatalities among riding mechanics ==
✝ indicates that the driver was killed in the same incident.

Mechanician	Driver	Date of incident	Sanction	Track	Event	Team/Owner	Car/Entry	Session
Erick Schrader (USA)	Bob Burman (USA) ✝	April 8, 1916	AAA	Grand Boulevard (Corona)	Corona Grand Prize		Peugeot	Race
Roxie Pallotti (USA)	Carl Limberg (USA) ✝	May 13, 1916	AAA	Sheepshead Bay Speedway	Metropolitan Trophy		Delage	Race
Dan Colombo (USA)	Aldo Franchi (USA)	July 15, 1916	AAA	Omaha Speedway	150-mile race		Peugeot – Sunbeam "Peusun"	Race
Marion Arnold (USA)	Andy Burt (USA)	August 27, 1916	AAA	Recreation Park (Kalamazoo)	100-mile race		Stutz	Race
Bert Shields (USA) (Note: Shields died on September 30, 1916, twenty-six days after his crash.)	Gil Andersen (USA)	September 4, 1916	AAA	Cincinnati Motor Speedway	International Sweepstakes		Stutz	Race
Ralph Hetlich (USA) (Note: Hetlich died on October 31, 1916, seventeen days after his accident.)	Wilbur D'Alene (USA)	October 14, 1916	AAA	Speedway Park	Grand American Auto Race		Crawford – Duesenberg	Race
Charles Swartz (USA)	Harry Horsman (USA) (Note: Horsman, who had not been officially entered in the event and did not observe the starter's flag indicating the end of the practice session, was released from hospital a week after his crash.)	November 10, 1916	AAA/ACA	Santa Monica Road Race Course		Harry Horsman	Mercer	Practice
Gaston Weigle (FRA)	Frank Galvin (USA) ✝	December 2, 1916	AAA	Uniontown Speedway	Universal Trophy		Premier	Race
Lyall Jolls (USA)	Eddie O'Donnell (USA) ✝	November 25, 1920	AAA	Beverly Hills Speedway	250-mile race		Duesenberg	Race
Harry Barner (USA)	Alton Soules (USA) ✝	October 1, 1921	AAA	Fresno Speedway	San Joaquin Valley Classic		Frontenac	Race
Paul Marshall (USA)	Cy Marshall (USA)	May 30, 1930	AAA	Indianapolis Motor Speedway	Indianapolis 500	George Henry	Duesenberg	Race
William Berry (USA)	Doc MacKenzie (USA)	June 8, 1930	AAA	Michigan State Fairgrounds	100-mile race	Ambler	Ambler – Buick	Qualifying
Clarence Grove (USA)	Joe Caccia (USA) ✝	May 26, 1931	AAA	Indianapolis Motor Speedway	Indianapolis 500	Alvin Jones	Duesenberg "Jones & Maley"	Practice
Harry Cox (USA)	Bennie Benefiel (USA)	May 25, 1932	AAA	Indianapolis Motor Speedway	Indianapolis 500	Alvin Jones	Duesenberg "Jones & Maley"	Qualifying
Bob Hurst (USA)	Bill Denver (USA) ✝	May 28, 1933	AAA	Indianapolis Motor Speedway	Indianapolis 500	Ray Brady	? – Studebaker "Brady & Nardi"	Qualifying
G. L. Jordan (USA)	Lester Spangler (USA) ✝	May 30, 1933	AAA	Indianapolis Motor Speedway	Indianapolis 500	Harry Hartz	Miller	Race
Bob Hahn (USA)	Pete Kreis (USA) ✝	May 25, 1934	AAA	Indianapolis Motor Speedway	Indianapolis 500	Harry Hartz	Miller FD – Miller "Miller-Hartz"	Practice
Leo Whitaker (USA)	Stubby Stubblefield (USA) ✝	May 21, 1935	AAA	Indianapolis Motor Speedway	Indianapolis 500	Phil Shafer	? – Buick "Victor Gasket"	Qualifying
Spider Matlock (USA) (Note: Matlock died on January 27, 1936, the day after his crash.)	Al Gordon (USA) ✝	January 26, 1936	AAA	Ascot Speedway	125-mile race	Bill White	Wetteroth – Offenhauser	Race
Albert Opalko (USA)	Frank McGurk (USA)	May 28, 1937	AAA	Indianapolis Motor Speedway	Indianapolis 500	Murrell Belanger	Stevens – Miller "Belanger-Miller"	Qualifying
Lawson Harris (USA)	Babe Stapp (USA)	September 20, 1939		Indianapolis Motor Speedway	Firestone tire test	Mike Boyle	Miller FD – Miller	Testing

== Fatalities among non-participants ==
This section lists people who have been fatally injured in close connection to the racing taking place at an event while not occupying a race car including participants being on the sidelines.

Name	Date of incident	Sanction	Track	Event	Session	Role	Course of events
William Speer (USA)	April 8, 1916	AAA	Grand Boulevard (Corona)	Corona Grand Prize	Race	Police officer	Due to tire damage, Bob Burman's racer skidded, turned over and dashed into a crowd of people, several of whom were injured. Burman, his mechanician Erick Schrader, and a police officer died.
Harold Edgington (USA)	November 18, 1916	ACA	Santa Monica Road Race Course	American Grand Prize	Race	Spectator	With his left front wheel buckling, Lewis Jackson missed a slight turn. His car slid along the roadside and struck several people, three of them fatally. Jackson died being pinned against a tree.
Leslie Jenkins (USA)	November 18, 1916	ACA	Santa Monica Road Race Course	American Grand Prize	Race	Camera operator	With his left front wheel buckling, Lewis Jackson missed a slight turn. His car slid along the roadside and struck several people, three of them fatally. Jackson died being pinned against a tree.
Lena Juratsch (USA)	November 18, 1916	ACA	Santa Monica Road Race Course	American Grand Prize	Race	Street vendor	With his left front wheel buckling, Lewis Jackson missed a slight turn. His car slid along the roadside and struck several people, three of them fatally. Jackson died being pinned against a tree.
Hughie Hughes (UK)	December 2, 1916	AAA	Uniontown Speedway	Universal Trophy	Race	Driver	Frank Galvin lost control of his racer, smashed through the guard rail and slammed into the press stand, injuring several of its occupants and crushing to death Hughie Hughes, who had crashed out of the race himself and was standing by the press box. Gaston Weigle, Galvin's mechanician, was also killed. Galvin died two days later.
Bert Shoup (USA)	May 30, 1923	AAA	Indianapolis Motor Speedway	Indianapolis 500	Race	Spectator	Tom Alley, who was relief driving for Earl Cooper, slid, rolled over and penetrated a fence, killing a 15-year-old spectator and hurting two other boys and himself.
Russ Hughes (USA)	November 29, 1923	AAA	Beverly Hills Speedway	250-mile race	Pre-race	Photographer	Attempting a start before the race, Harry Hartz hit a photographer, a team owner, and a mechanic, killing the former two and severely injuring the latter.
George Wade (USA)	November 29, 1923	AAA	Beverly Hills Speedway	250-mile race	Pre-race	Team owner	Attempting a start before the race, Harry Hartz hit a photographer, a team owner, and a mechanic, killing the former two and severely injuring the latter.
Dan Shaw (USA)	October 12, 1925	AAA	Rockingham Speedway	Autumn Classic	Practice	Mechanic	The car driven by Vic Spooner veered into the pits where it fatally struck his mechanic before hitting the steel railing, being sent into the air, landing besides the track and catching fire. Spooner survived a concussion.
Wilbur Brink (USA)	May 30, 1931	AAA	Indianapolis Motor Speedway	Indianapolis 500	Race	Bystander	Billy Arnold's racer lost a wheel, which cleared the retaining wall and killed an 11-year-old boy who was off the speedway's property.
Otto Rohde (USA)	May 28, 1937	AAA	Indianapolis Motor Speedway	Indianapolis 500	Practice	Pit attendant	Overton Phillips lost control of his burning car, the gas tank of which had been pierced. Spinning into the pit area, it collided with another machine and inflicted fatal injuries on two attendants, one of whom died four days later, with three other people being hurt including Phillips.
George Warford (USA)	May 28, 1937	AAA	Indianapolis Motor Speedway	Indianapolis 500	Practice	Pit attendant	Overton Phillips lost control of his burning car, the gas tank of which had been pierced. Spinning into the pit area, it collided with another machine and inflicted fatal injuries on two attendants, one of whom died four days later, with three other people being hurt including Phillips.
Everett Spence (USA)	May 30, 1938	AAA	Indianapolis Motor Speedway	Indianapolis 500	Race	Spectator	The tire and rim came off a wheel of the racer driven by Emil Andres, traveled through the air and fatally struck a spectator who was seated on a truck in the infield.
Sam Stovall (USA)	April 14, 1946	AAA	Williams Grove Speedway	30-lap Big car race	Feature race	Spectator	A spectator who had been hit by a car while he was crossing the track near completion of the race died of his injuries two days later.
Peter Stupurak (USA)	October 15, 1950	AAA	California State Fairgrounds	100-mile race	Race	Spectator	Tony Bettenhausen ran into and climbed up the rear of Walt Faulkner's racer, flipped over and smashed through a fence, hurting four spectators, one of whom died the next day.
Lawrence Syrell (USA)	September 12, 1953	AAA	New York State Fairgrounds	100-mile race	Race	Spectator	Trying to thread his way through Jimmy Bryan's spinning car and the fence, Chuck Stevenson hopped the outside wall, killing one spectator and injuring another 14.
Clay Smith (USA)	September 6, 1954	AAA	DuQuoin State Fairgrounds	Ted Horn Memorial	Race	Mechanic	Rodger Ward lost a tire, locked wheels with Chuck Stevenson and spun into the pit area where he overturned, killing a mechanic and hurting eight other people.
William Craig (USA)	May 30, 1960	USAC	Indianapolis Motor Speedway	Indianapolis 500	Race	Spectator	A makeshift 30-foot (9.1 m) scaffold, which had privately been erected in the infield, toppled from the flatbed truck it was attached to during the parade lap before the start of the race, when the people occupying the structure leaned forward to watch the field drive by. They either fell or jumped to the ground where other attendants were hit by tumbling bodies or debris. Two spectators were killed, 82 sustained injuries.
Fred Linder (USA)	May 30, 1960	USAC	Indianapolis Motor Speedway	Indianapolis 500	Race	Spectator	A makeshift 30-foot (9.1 m) scaffold, which had privately been erected in the infield, toppled from the flatbed truck it was attached to during the parade lap before the start of the race, when the people occupying the structure leaned forward to watch the field drive by. They either fell or jumped to the ground where other attendants were hit by tumbling bodies or debris. Two spectators were killed, 82 sustained injuries.
John Masariu (USA)	May 30, 1961	USAC	Indianapolis Motor Speedway	Indianapolis 500	Race	Safety worker	After a fire on Eddie Johnson's racer had been put out, a fire truck which was retreating from the scene backed over and killed a safety worker who was clearing a path for the vehicle.
Ralph Heger (USA)	August 20, 1966	USAC	Illinois State Fairgrounds	Tony Bettenhausen Memorial	Qualifying	Stage manager	A scheduled performance by the Green Berets required a rope to be stretched from a platform mounted on the roof of the grandstand to the infield across the track. Shortly after a tow truck had tautened the rope, the structure came loose and plunged into the reviewing stand, crushing to death a stage manager. Two photographers who had occupied the platform fell to their deaths, 38 people were injured by debris.
Robert Lockwood (USA)	August 20, 1966	USAC	Illinois State Fairgrounds	Tony Bettenhausen Memorial	Qualifying	Photographer	A scheduled performance by the Green Berets required a rope to be stretched from a platform mounted on the roof of the grandstand to the infield across the track. Shortly after a tow truck had tautened the rope, the structure came loose and plunged into the reviewing stand, crushing to death a stage manager. Two photographers who had occupied the platform fell to their deaths, 38 people were injured by debris.
Dale Mueller (USA)	August 20, 1966	USAC	Illinois State Fairgrounds	Tony Bettenhausen Memorial	Qualifying	Photographer	A scheduled performance by the Green Berets required a rope to be stretched from a platform mounted on the roof of the grandstand to the infield across the track. Shortly after a tow truck had tautened the rope, the structure came loose and plunged into the reviewing stand, crushing to death a stage manager. Two photographers who had occupied the platform fell to their deaths, 38 people were injured by debris.
Red Stainton (USA)	April 13, 1969	USAC	Hanford Motor Speedway	California 200	Race	Mechanic	Fuel leaking from Art Pollard's car was ignited during a pit stop, causing burns to two attendants, one of whom leapt back into the path of Mario Andretti's car and was struck. The mechanic died of his injuries two days later.
Armando Teran (USA)	May 30, 1973	USAC	Indianapolis Motor Speedway	Indianapolis 500	Race	Team member	Rushing to the scene of Swede Savage's crash, a fire truck hit and killed a crewman for Graham McRae on pit lane.
Lyle Kurtenbach (USA)	May 24, 1987	USAC	Indianapolis Motor Speedway	Indianapolis 500	Race	Spectator	A tire which had come off Tony Bettenhausen Jr.'s racer was catapulted into the stands by Roberto Guerrero's car and fatally struck a spectator in the head.
Jean Patrick Hein (CAN)	September 2, 1990	CART	Vancouver street circuit	Molson Indy Vancouver	Race	Marshal	Having pushed Ross Bentley's stalled racer out of a chicane area, three track workers rushed into the path of Willy T. Ribbs's car, which was coming around the corner. Two of them were hurt when colliding with the car's rear. The third sustained fatal injuries when he was hit and overrun by the left rear wheel.
Gary Avrin (CAN)	July 14, 1996	CART	Toronto street circuit	Molson Indy Toronto	Race	Marshal	After Jeff Krosnoff's racer had touched wheels with that of Stefan Johansson, it was catapulted into the air and fatally struck a track worker who was positioned behind the wall lining the track while on its way into the catch fence where it disintegrated on impact, the cockpit coming to a stop against the opposite wall. Krosnoff was killed, too. Another marshal was slightly hurt.
Kenneth Fox (USA)	July 26, 1998	CART	Michigan Speedway	U.S. 500	Race	Spectator	On lap 175, Adrián Fernández slammed into the outside wall in turn four. His right front wheel was torn off and hurled over the fence into the stands, killing three spectators and injuring six others.
Sheryl Laster (USA)	July 26, 1998	CART	Michigan Speedway	U.S. 500	Race	Spectator	On lap 175, Adrián Fernández slammed into the outside wall in turn four. His right front wheel was torn off and hurled over the fence into the stands, killing three spectators and injuring six others.
Michael Tautkus (USA)	July 26, 1998	CART	Michigan Speedway	U.S. 500	Race	Spectator	On lap 175, Adrián Fernández slammed into the outside wall in turn four. His right front wheel was torn off and hurled over the fence into the stands, killing three spectators and injuring six others.
Barry Mobley (USA)	May 1, 1999	IRL	Lowe's Motor Speedway	VisionAire 500K	Race	Spectator	On lap 59, Stan Wattles crashed into the outside wall in turn four, shearing off both right-side wheels. John Paul Jr.'s car hit one of them, propelling it over the fence into the stands. As a result, three spectators were killed and eight others, two of whom were children, sustained injuries. The race was abandoned before completing the necessary 104 laps to be official.
Jeffrey Patton (USA)	May 1, 1999	IRL	Lowe's Motor Speedway	VisionAire 500K	Race	Spectator	On lap 59, Stan Wattles crashed into the outside wall in turn four, shearing off both right-side wheels. John Paul Jr.'s car hit one of them, propelling it over the fence into the stands. As a result, three spectators were killed and eight others, two of whom were children, sustained injuries. The race was abandoned before completing the necessary 104 laps to be official.
Randy Pyatte (USA)	May 1, 1999	IRL	Lowe's Motor Speedway	VisionAire 500K	Race	Spectator	On lap 59, Stan Wattles crashed into the outside wall in turn four, shearing off both right-side wheels. John Paul Jr.'s car hit one of them, propelling it over the fence into the stands. As a result, three spectators were killed and eight others, two of whom were children, sustained injuries. The race was abandoned before completing the necessary 104 laps to be official.

== See also ==
- List of fatalities at the Indianapolis Motor Speedway
