= List of fatalities at the Indianapolis Motor Speedway =

The following is a list of 74 individuals whose deaths have been related to the Indianapolis Motor Speedway, located in Speedway, Indiana: 42 drivers, 1 motorcyclist, 13 riding mechanics, and 18 others including a pit crew member, track personnel, and spectators have sustained fatal injuries or have had fatal medical conditions. The fatalities are connected with Championship Car racing at the track unless otherwise noted.

Fifty-nine of the 74 fatalities have occurred as part of the Indianapolis 500 (including the race, qualifying, and practice). Fatalities have also occurred in conjunction with the precursors to the 500 (which took place in 1909 and 1910), the Brickyard 400, the Moto GP event, the Speedway's golf course, and during private testing.

During World War I, while the Speedway was being used as a landing strip and a maintenance and refueling station for the 821st Aero Repair Squadron, at least one test pilot was fatally injured in a plane crash at the track. In July 1926, the Speedway neighborhood of Indianapolis voted to incorporate itself as an independent town, Speedway, Indiana.

== Fatalities ==
Name	Role	Date	Sanction	Event	Session	Course of events
William Bourque	Driver	August 19, 1909	AAA	Prest-O-Lite Trophy	Race	On the 58th lap of the 250-mile race, William Bourque glanced backwards momentarily when his Knox hit a rut, swerved into a ditch, flipped over and landed against the fence lining the outside of the frontstretch. Bourque was trapped under the car and his riding mechanic Harry Holcomb had struck a post with his head, being killed instantly. Bourque died shortly thereafter.
Harry Holcomb	Riding mechanic	August 19, 1909	AAA	Prest-O-Lite Trophy	Race	On the 58th lap of the 250-mile race, William Bourque glanced backwards momentarily when his Knox hit a rut, swerved into a ditch, flipped over and landed against the fence lining the outside of the frontstretch. Bourque was trapped under the car and his riding mechanic Harry Holcomb had struck a post with his head, being killed instantly. Bourque died shortly thereafter.
Claude Kellum	Riding mechanic	August 21, 1909	AAA	Wheeler-Schebler Trophy	Race	During the 300-mile race, Claude Kellum first served as the riding mechanic for Johnny Aitken, who was forced to retire with a cracked cylinder head after 40 laps. Kellum then relieved Robert Lyne as the riding mechanic for Charlie Merz. While driving down the frontstretch, Merz's National blew its right front tire, and the car flipped up into the stands, pinning Merz underneath. He escaped injury. Kellum was thrown from the car, and died from his injuries an hour later. Spectators Omar D. Jolliffe, 27, of Franklin, Indiana, and James West, 38, of Indianapolis, were also killed by the crashed car. Following another accident, the race was abandoned after 235 miles.
Omar Jolliffe	Spectator	August 21, 1909	AAA	Wheeler-Schebler Trophy	Race	
James West	Spectator	August 21, 1909	AAA	Wheeler-Schebler Trophy	Race	
Tom Kincade	Driver	July 6, 1910		National race car test	Testing	Tommy Kincade went off the embankment at the second turn and was crushed to death by his machine.
Sam Dickson	Riding mechanic	May 30, 1911	AAA	Indianapolis 500	Race	Sam Dickson was the riding mechanic for Arthur Greiner and the first person killed during the Indianapolis 500. On lap twelve, one of the front wheels came off the American Simplex Greiner was driving, causing him to lose control and both men to be thrown from the car. While Greiner escaped with a broken arm, Dickson flew into a fence 20 feet (6.1 m) from the car. Reports state that Dickson was killed instantly, although the crowd evidently swarmed around the body, requiring the state militia who were acting as security at the event to use their guns as clubs to clear a path for the attending doctors.
Harry Martin	Driver	June 26, 1913		Stutz race car test	Testing	After a tire on the car Harry Martin was driving had blown out, the car skidded into the outside wall, bounced back, overturned and rolled down the first turn, pinning Martin and his riding mechanic Frank Agan under the wreckage. Martin was killed instantly, Agan survived serious injuries.
Albert Johnson	Driver	October 4, 1915		Packard race car test	Testing	A tire failure caused the car Albert Johnson was driving to roll over several times. He died on the operating table early the next morning. Johnson's riding mechanic Ross Robinson was injured.
Arthur Thurman	Driver	May 31, 1919	AAA	Indianapolis 500	Race	The Thurman Special driven by Arthur Thurman turned over on lap 45. While Thurman was killed, his riding mechanic Nicholas Molinaro survived critical injuries.
Louis LeCocq	Driver	May 31, 1919	AAA	Indianapolis 500	Race	Louis LeCocq's Roamer Special turned over on lap 96, causing the fuel tank to explode, and burst into flames. LeCocq was killed along with his riding mechanic Robert Bandini.
Robert Bandini	Riding mechanic	May 31, 1919	AAA	Indianapolis 500	Race	Louis LeCocq's Roamer Special turned over on lap 96, causing the fuel tank to explode, and burst into flames. LeCocq was killed along with his riding mechanic Robert Bandini.
Bert Shoup	Spectator	May 30, 1923	AAA	Indianapolis 500	Race	On lap 22, Tom Alley, who was relief driving for Earl Cooper, wrecked on the backstretch, going through the wall, and killed 15-year-old spectator Bert S. Shoup of Lafayette, Indiana. Alley and two other spectators were injured.
Herbert Jones	Driver	May 27, 1926	AAA	Indianapolis 500	Qualifying	After making contact with the turn four retaining wall, Herbert Jones's car shot across the track to the inside, tumbled and came to a stop upside down with Jones trapped inside. He sustained a fractured skull, and died the following day.
Bill Spence	Driver	May 30, 1929	AAA	Indianapolis 500	Race	Bill Spence's Duesenberg turned over in turn two on lap ten, throwing him from the car when it hit the wall. He died of a fractured skull en route to the hospital.
Paul Marshall	Riding mechanic	May 30, 1930	AAA	Indianapolis 500	Race	Paul Marshall was serving as the riding mechanic for his brother Cy Marshall when their car crashed in turn three on lap 29. Cy Marshall was seriously injured, but survived while Paul Marshall was killed.
Joe Caccia	Driver	May 26, 1931	AAA	Indianapolis 500	Practice	Entering turn two, Joe Caccia lost control of his car, crashed through the outside wall, and hurtled 100 feet (30 m) down the embankment, crashing into a tree. Both Caccia and his riding mechanic Clarence Grove were thrown from the car, which burst into flames, enveloping both, and struck the racers when landing. They died at the scene.
Clarence Grove	Riding mechanic	May 26, 1931	AAA	Indianapolis 500	Practice	Entering turn two, Joe Caccia lost control of his car, crashed through the outside wall, and hurtled 100 feet (30 m) down the embankment, crashing into a tree. Both Caccia and his riding mechanic Clarence Grove were thrown from the car, which burst into flames, enveloping both, and struck the racers when landing. They died at the scene.
Wilbur Brink	Bystander	May 30, 1931	AAA	Indianapolis 500	Race	On lap 162, Billy Arnold, the defending Indianapolis 500 winner, while leading, broke his rear axle as he negotiated the fourth turn. He lost control of his car and tumbled over the fourth turn wall. In the process, the rear tire from the broken axle was sent sailing into the air and out of the track. The tire bounced over the fence of the speedway and over the Brinks's house across the street, located on 2316 Georgetown Road. The tire landed on Wilbur C. Brink's head, killing him. Brink was an 11-year-old boy seated on an ice chest near his father's impromptu refreshment stand in his front yard. Arnold and his riding mechanic Spider Matlock were injured.
Harry Cox	Riding mechanic	May 25, 1932	AAA	Indianapolis 500	Qualifying	Warming up his racer, in which Joe Caccia and Clarence Grove had died the year before, Bennie Benefiel crashed in turn one and went over the outside wall. The car fell 18 feet (5.5 m) to the ground and crashed into trees. Benefiel was seriously injured and his riding mechanic Harry Cox was killed.
Milton Jones	Driver	May 27, 1932	AAA	Indianapolis 500	Practice	Going into turn three, the car Jones was driving spun, and hit the outside wall backwards. It flipped up into the concrete wall, and rolled over several times. Both Jones and his riding mechanic Harold Gray were thrown from the car. Jones died in the hospital about six hours after the crash, while Gray survived, having sustained a broken arm and internal injuries.
Bill Denver	Driver	May 28, 1933	AAA	Indianapolis 500	Qualifying	Bill Denver and his riding mechanic Bob Hurst were killed on a warm-up lap in preparation for a qualifying run.
Bob Hurst	Riding mechanic	May 28, 1933	AAA	Indianapolis 500	Qualifying	Bill Denver and his riding mechanic Bob Hurst were killed on a warm-up lap in preparation for a qualifying run.
Mark Billman	Driver	May 30, 1933	AAA	Indianapolis 500	Race	On the 79th lap, Mark Billman in the Kemp-Mannix Special skidded on the second turn, hit the outside wall and finally came to rest with the car astride the wall. He was pinned between the left front wheel and the wall and it took 20 minutes to extricate him. His left arm was torn off, both legs were broken and he was internally injured. In spite of blood transfusions, Billman died an hour later. His riding mechanic Elmer Lombard, who was catapulted out of the car, was not seriously hurt.
Lester Spangler	Driver	May 30, 1933	AAA	Indianapolis 500	Race	Les Spangler and his riding mechanic "Monk" Jordan died in a crash on the 132nd lap. The car of Malcolm Fox spun coming out of turn one, and was rolling slowly towards the top of the track. Spangler tried to get by on the outside, but ran out of room and plowed into Fox's car head-on at over 100 mph (160 km/h). Spangler's car rolled over while still maintaining its speed, ejecting its occupants, both of whom were killed. Fox and his riding mechanic Burton Cook were slightly injured.
G. L. Jordan	Riding mechanic	May 30, 1933	AAA	Indianapolis 500	Race	Les Spangler and his riding mechanic "Monk" Jordan died in a crash on the 132nd lap. The car of Malcolm Fox spun coming out of turn one, and was rolling slowly towards the top of the track. Spangler tried to get by on the outside, but ran out of room and plowed into Fox's car head-on at over 100 mph (160 km/h). Spangler's car rolled over while still maintaining its speed, ejecting its occupants, both of whom were killed. Fox and his riding mechanic Burton Cook were slightly injured.
Pete Kreis	Driver	May 25, 1934	AAA	Indianapolis 500	Practice	Coming out of the first turn, Pete Kreis lost control of his car, which smashed into and mounted the outside wall and from there tumbled 15 feet (4.6 m) before hitting a tree. Kreis, who was thrown from the car, was killed instantly. His riding mechanic Bob Hahn died shortly thereafter.
Bob Hahn	Riding mechanic	May 25, 1934	AAA	Indianapolis 500	Practice	Coming out of the first turn, Pete Kreis lost control of his car, which smashed into and mounted the outside wall and from there tumbled 15 feet (4.6 m) before hitting a tree. Kreis, who was thrown from the car, was killed instantly. His riding mechanic Bob Hahn died shortly thereafter.
Johnny Hannon	Driver	May 21, 1935	AAA	Indianapolis 500	Practice	Johnny Hannon was a rookie driver, making his first practice run. On his first lap at racing speed, he lost control of the car, and went over the turn three wall. He was thrown from the vehicle, which then landed on top of him. Hannon was killed instantly from a fractured skull while his riding mechanic Oscar Reeves was seriously injured. This accident led to the speedway requiring rookie tests in subsequent years.
Stubby Stubblefield	Driver	May 21, 1935	AAA	Indianapolis 500	Qualifying	Stubby Stubblefield's car rode over the wall in turn two, and flipped over, ejecting both him and his riding mechanic Leo Whitaker. The car ended up upside down and leaning against a fence, largely destroyed. The two racers died on the way to the hospital.
Leo Whitaker	Riding mechanic	May 21, 1935	AAA	Indianapolis 500	Qualifying	Stubby Stubblefield's car rode over the wall in turn two, and flipped over, ejecting both him and his riding mechanic Leo Whitaker. The car ended up upside down and leaning against a fence, largely destroyed. The two racers died on the way to the hospital.
Clay Weatherly	Driver	May 30, 1935	AAA	Indianapolis 500	Race	Clay Weatherly was driving the same car in which Johnny Hannon had a fatal crash nine days earlier while practicing. Moreover, in a practice run the throttle had stuck, forcing Weatherly to kill the engine to avoid another crash. On lap nine of the race, Weatherly's car crashed into the wall in turn four near Stand H, turned over, and both its occupants were thrown onto the track. Weatherly was already dead when rescue crews arrived. His riding mechanic Francis Bradburn was critically injured but survived.
Otto Rohde	Pit attendant	May 28, 1937	AAA	Indianapolis 500	Practice	The Duesenberg driven by Overton Phillips burst into flames when its crankshaft broke and punctured the gas tank. The car spun into the pit area, where it crashed into and set afire a parked Studebaker racer and hit a group of pit attendants, killing George F. Warford, 42, of Indianapolis. Injured were Phillips and his riding mechanic Walter King, Anthony Caccia, the brother of Joe Caccia, who had been killed in practice for the 1931 race, and Otto C. Rohde, 49, of Toledo, Ohio, chief engineer of Champion Spark Plug. Rohde died of his injuries four days later on June 1, 1937.
George Warford	Pit attendant	May 28, 1937	AAA	Indianapolis 500	Practice	
Albert Opalko	Riding mechanic	May 28, 1937	AAA	Indianapolis 500	Qualifying	Having completed four of ten scheduled qualifying laps, Frank McGurk's car plunged through an inner rail, overturned and ejected both McGurk, who was hospitalized in serious condition but survived, and his riding mechanic Albert Opalko, who was killed. The crash was caused by a broken connecting rod. Opalko is the most recent driver to be fatally injured during an official qualifying run — all subsequent fatalities during time trials have occurred on warm-up laps, prior to receiving the green flag to officially start the respective runs.
Everett Spence	Spectator	May 30, 1938	AAA	Indianapolis 500	Race	When the tire and rim came off a wheel of the Elgin Piston Special driven by Emil Andres, the car was sent spinning, rolled over three times, ejecting the driver, and only came to a stop after penetrating the inner rail. Andres, who had sustained multiple injuries, was hospitalized in serious condition. The tire and rim, while traveling through the air, caught Everett G. Spence, 33, of North Terre Haute, Indiana, who was seated on a truck in the infield on turn two, and knocked him back onto another truck, inflicting fatal head injuries.
Floyd Roberts	Driver	May 30, 1939	AAA	Indianapolis 500	Race	Defending Indianapolis 500 winner Floyd Roberts was on lap 107, when Bob Swanson, who had just started relief driving for Ralph Hepburn, lost control of his car coming out of turn two and went sideways. Roberts's left front wheel came into contact with the right rear of Swanson's car, which ejected its driver before going up in smoke and fire, while Roberts's car shot through the turn's outer board fence and hurtled into the adjacent golf course. Chet Miller swung to the inside in trying to evade the wreck, but ripped through a fence and was thrown from his car when it overturned with two spectators being injured by flying debris. Swanson and Miller escaped with injuries as well, whereas Roberts died in Methodist Hospital.
Lawson Harris	Riding mechanic	September 20, 1939		Firestone tire test	Testing	Babe Stapp was rounding the first turn at approximately 116 mph (187 km/h), when a broken axle or tie-rod incapacitated the right front wheel of his car, which was rendered uncontrollable and crashed into a wall. Stapp's riding mechanic Lawson Harris was thrown to the ground and, having lost his helmet, sustained fatal head injuries. Stapp managed to stop the car and got away with a cut lip and a bruised leg.
George Bailey	Driver	May 7, 1940	AAA	Indianapolis 500	Practice	George Bailey lost control of his rear-engined Miller on the second turn. The car struck the outside wall and skidded across the track to the inside apron, set afire by its ruptured gas tank. Bailey, who was tossed out, died of severe burns a little later.
Shorty Cantlon	Driver	May 30, 1947	AAA	Indianapolis 500	Race	Shorty Cantlon swerved to avoid Bill Holland's car, which had gone onto the inside grass and skidded back across the track. Cantlon's car went into the outside wall nearly head-on, causing him severe chest, leg and internal injuries. He died in the track hospital shortly afterward.
Ralph Hepburn	Driver	May 16, 1948	AAA	Indianapolis 500	Practice	Ralph Hepburn's Novi became loose and swerved towards the infield entering turn three. Hepburn tried to correct it as he drove over the infield grass, causing the car to turn sharply to the right, and it hit the outside wall head-on at approximately 130 mph (210 km/h). A physician on the scene said Hepburn died instantly from a skull fracture and crushed chest, and it took about twenty minutes to remove Hepburn's body from the car.
George Metzler	Driver	May 28, 1949	AAA	Indianapolis 500	Practice	George Metzler crashed in turn one. He died of a crushed chest and head injuries in Methodist Hospital six days later.
Chet Miller	Driver	May 15, 1953	AAA	Indianapolis 500	Practice	After practicing all day, at 3:15 p.m., Chet Miller was clocked with a lap of 138.46 mph (222.83 km/h) in his Novi Special. Going into turn one, he went too low, and the left-front wheel got into the apron and the car started skidding. The back end came around, and the car crashed into the outside wall nearly head-on in a crash similar to Ralph Hepburn's in 1948. It rode along the wall and came to a stop on the south short chute. Miller died of a basilar skull fracture and a brain hemorrhage.
Carl Scarborough	Driver	May 30, 1953	AAA	Indianapolis 500	Race	During one of the hottest runnings of the 500, Carl Scarborough died of what was reported as heat prostration a short time after yielding his car to a relief driver on lap 70. According to speedway historian Donald Davidson, when Scarborough pulled into the pits, smoke or a small fire may have broken out on the car, which crews quickly doused with fire extinguishers. In the process, Scarborough may have inhaled CO_{2}, which may have contributed to, or been the actual cause of death.
Manny Ayulo	Driver	May 16, 1955	AAA	Indianapolis 500	Practice	Smashing into the concrete wall on the first turn, Manuel Ayulo sustained critical injuries. He died in Methodist Hospital the following day.
Bill Vukovich	Driver	May 30, 1955	AAA	Indianapolis 500	Race	Bill Vukovich, the two-time and reigning Indianapolis 500 champion, was leading the race when Rodger Ward broke his axle and spun his car on the backstretch near turn three, and came to a stop in the middle of the track. Behind him were Al Keller and Johnny Boyd. Keller, attempting to avoid Ward, swerved off the course, came back on and T-boned the car of Boyd, pushing it into the path of Vukovich, who was attempting to lap the other three drivers. Vukovich's car ran over the right rear tire of Boyd's, sending both into the air. Boyd's and Vukovich's cars struck the golf course bridge (which has been replaced with a tunnel), with Boyd's car striking upside down and Vukovich's striking driver's side up. After landing, Vukovich's car hit and went over the outer wall, sending it into a high-speed cartwheel outside the track. The car clipped a couple of spectators' vehicles and eventually came to rest upside down and in flames. Vukovich died instantly of a basilar skull fracture.
Keith Andrews	Driver	May 15, 1957	USAC	Indianapolis 500	Practice	Keith Andrews was hired as a back-up driver to Giuseppe Farina. While negotiating turn four, Andrews got too low and lost control of his car, which skidded 755 feet (230 m) before smashing against the end of the inside retaining wall tail-first. The back end of the car shoved Andrews up against the steering wheel, breaking his neck and killing him instantly.
Pat O'Connor	Driver	May 30, 1958	USAC	Indianapolis 500	Race	On the opening lap, a 15-car pileup occurred in turn three. According to A. J. Foyt, Pat O'Connor's car hit that of Jimmy Reece, sailed 50 feet (15 m) in the air, landed upside down, and burst into flames. Although O'Connor was badly burned in the accident, medical officials said that he was probably killed instantly from a fractured skull. Rookie Indianapolis 500 announcer Lou Palmer called the first-lap crash for the Indianapolis Motor Speedway Radio Network. Palmer had been placed in turn three because "nothing ever happens there".
Jerry Unser	Driver	May 2, 1959	USAC	Indianapolis 500	Practice	Coming out of turn four, Jerry Unser Jr. lost control of his car, which spun and hit the outside and inside walls. The fuel tank was punctured and the car caught fire. Unser was taken to the hospital with burns. He died of complications 15 days later. His death led the Speedway to require fireproof uniforms to be worn by all drivers while on the track.
Bob Cortner	Driver	May 19, 1959	USAC	Indianapolis 500	Practice	On Monday, May 18, Bob Cortner passed his rookie test. The next day, Cortner took to the track for a practice run. Johnnie Parsons, who observed the accident, reported that the wind was blowing hard and that Cortner got caught in a crosswind. The car slid to the infield before shooting back across the track head-on into the outside wall. Cortner's face hit the steering wheel and it appeared he began bleeding internally. He was pronounced dead that evening, the cause being listed as "massive head injuries".
William Craig	Spectator	May 30, 1960	USAC	Indianapolis 500	Race	Two spectators in the infield, Fred H. Linder, 36, of Indianapolis, and William C. Craig, 37, of Zionsville, Indiana, were killed, and as many as 82 were injured, when a homemade scaffolding collapsed. Approximately 125–130 patrons had paid a small fee ($5–$10) to view the race from the 30 feet (9.1 m) tall scaffolding, erected by a private individual (Wilbur Shortridge Jr.) and not the speedway—a practice that was allowed at the time. During the parade lap as the field drove by, the people on the platform began to lean and wave at the cars, which caused the scaffolding to become unstable. It soon tipped forward and fell to the ground, crushing people who were underneath the structure, and the 125–130 people who were on it either fell or jumped to the ground. Linder and Craig were pronounced dead of broken necks, and over 80 were injured, about 22 seriously.
Fred Linder	Spectator	May 30, 1960	USAC	Indianapolis 500	Race	
Tony Bettenhausen	Driver	May 12, 1961	USAC	Indianapolis 500	Practice	Tony Bettenhausen Sr. was testing a Stearly Motor Freight Special for his friend Paul Russo. Down the main stretch, the car smashed into the outside wall of the track and then rolled 325 feet (99 m) along the barrier. The car came to rest entangled in the fence on top of the wall in front of Grandstand A, with the tail of the car on fire. Results showed the accident was caused by an anchor bolt which fell off the front radius rod support, allowing the front axle to twist and mis-align the front wheels when the brakes were applied. Bettenhausen was killed instantly.
John Masariu	Safety worker	May 30, 1961	USAC	Indianapolis 500	Race	When Eddie Johnson hit the inside wall in turn four, a fire broke out on his car. A safety fire truck arrived and the flames were put out. Retreating from the scene, the truck driven by John B. Williams accidentally backed over his friend, John F. Masariu, 41, of Danville, Indiana, the principal of Ben Davis Junior High School, who was clearing a path for the vehicle. Masariu died of a crushed chest.
Dave MacDonald	Driver	May 30, 1964	USAC	Indianapolis 500	Race	Coming out of turn four on lap two, Dave MacDonald spun and crashed into the inside wall. The car exploded and went back onto the track, into the path of oncoming traffic. Eddie Sachs hit MacDonald's car, and his car caught fire as well. Sachs died instantly from blunt force injuries from the impact, but his body was only slightly burned. MacDonald, badly burned, died two and a half hours later in the hospital, his lungs seared from flame inhalation, causing acute pulmonary edema.
Eddie Sachs	Driver	May 30, 1964	USAC	Indianapolis 500	Race	Coming out of turn four on lap two, Dave MacDonald spun and crashed into the inside wall. The car exploded and went back onto the track, into the path of oncoming traffic. Eddie Sachs hit MacDonald's car, and his car caught fire as well. Sachs died instantly from blunt force injuries from the impact, but his body was only slightly burned. MacDonald, badly burned, died two and a half hours later in the hospital, his lungs seared from flame inhalation, causing acute pulmonary edema.
Jerry Albright	Maintenance worker	July 21, 1964				Two 17-year-old maintenance workers for the Speedway Golf Course, Jerome U. Albright of Valley Mills, Indiana and James P. Cross of Indianapolis, were fatally struck by lightning while seeking shelter in an outdoor restroom facility.
James Cross	Maintenance worker	July 21, 1964				Two 17-year-old maintenance workers for the Speedway Golf Course, Jerome U. Albright of Valley Mills, Indiana and James P. Cross of Indianapolis, were fatally struck by lightning while seeking shelter in an outdoor restroom facility.
Chuck Rodee	Driver	May 14, 1966	USAC	Indianapolis 500	Qualifying	Chuck Rodee spun on his second warm-up lap and his car hit the wall at the exit of turn one backwards. The impact appeared minor but the rigid chassis transferred virtually the entire force of the crash to the driver. Rodee sustained a ruptured aorta and lapsed into a coma. He was pronounced dead after emergency surgery failed to save him.
Mike Spence	Driver	May 7, 1968	USAC	Indianapolis 500	Practice	Mike Spence joined the Lotus effort as a replacement for Jim Clark, who was killed during the Deutschland Trophäe, a Formula 2 round at Hockenheimring, a month earlier. Driving an STP-backed Lotus 56 "Wedge" turbine machine, Spence lost control in turn one at about 163 mph (262 km/h). He hit the outside wall, and slid along the wall for almost 400 feet (120 m). The right-front wheel became dislodged, and struck him on the helmet. Spence died in the hospital, from massive head injuries, four and a half hours after the accident.
Jim Malloy	Driver	May 14, 1972	USAC	Indianapolis 500	Practice	On the second day of time trials, Jim Malloy was participating in the morning practice session. At 10:21 a.m., he was going down the backstretch into turn three when the car suddenly veered across the track, and hit the outside wall near the exit of turn three with the right-front. The car slid to a stop in the grass near turn four. Malloy, who was unconscious, sustained burns to his hands and feet, broke both arms and both legs, and had head injuries. He died in Methodist Hospital four days later.
Art Pollard	Driver	May 12, 1973	USAC	Indianapolis 500	Practice	On pole day, Art Pollard was participating in the morning practice session. At 9:47 a.m., after a lap of 192 mph (309 km/h), the car slammed the outside wall entering turn one. It spun towards the grass near the inside of the south short chute. The chassis dug into the grass and flipped upside-down, slid a short distance and then flipped back over as it reached the pavement again and came to rest upright in the south chute. Pollard was rushed to Methodist Hospital, and pronounced dead at 10:50 a.m. His injuries were reported to include pulmonary damage due to flame inhalation, third degree burns on both hands, face and neck, a fractured right arm, a fractured leg, and a severe spinal injury.
Swede Savage	Driver	May 30, 1973	USAC	Indianapolis 500	Race	On the 59th lap, Swede Savage lost control as he exited turn four. His car twitched back and forth, and then slid across to the inside of the track at nearly top speed. It hit the angled inside wall nearly head-on. The force of the impact, with the car carrying a full load of fuel, caused it to explode in a plume of flame. The engine and transaxle tumbled end-over-end to the pit lane entrance while Savage, still strapped in his seat, was thrown back across the circuit. He came to rest adjacent to the outer retaining wall, fully conscious and completely exposed while he lay in a pool of flaming methanol fuel. Savage was taken to a hospital with critical injuries, but was in stable condition. A little over a month later, he died in the hospital on July 2, 1973. In 2006, Steve Olvey, who tended to Savage at the circuit medical center, wrote Savage's death may have been from contaminated plasma from a blood transfusion (contraction of hepatitis B which caused liver failure). Angela Savage, Swede's daughter, has gone on record to say that the cause of death was lung failure.
Armando Teran	Team member	May 30, 1973	USAC	Indianapolis 500	Race	Armando M. Teran, 23, of Santa Monica, California, was a pit crew member for Graham McRae. Just moments after McRae's teammate Swede Savage had an ultimately fatal crash in turn four, Teran started sprinting up the pit lane. At the same time, a fire truck was signaled to head to the scene. Cleon Reynolds, the chief of the Speedway Fire Department, signaled for fire-safety truck driver Jerry Flake to proceed northbound up the pit lane to the crash scene. Flake was stationed at the south end of the pits. Flake, driving northbound, struck Teran, whose body was tossed about 50 feet (15 m). Teran sustained crushed ribs and a fractured skull, and was pronounced dead at 4:23 p.m. The incident was witnessed by thousands of spectators, as it occurred on the pit lane right at the start-finish line. It was erroneously reported by media that Flake was driving the wrong way, and was at fault; at the time, safety trucks were permitted to drive in the opposite direction of the racing cars. The following year, USAC prohibited safety trucks from driving in the opposite direction.
Leroy Elwell	Spectator	May 26, 1974	USAC	Indianapolis 500	Pre-race	Seated in Grandstand A, Leroy C. Elwell, 64, of Palm Beach, Florida, died of heart disease before the beginning of the race.
Tim Vail	Spectator	May 22, 1980	USAC	Indianapolis 500		On Carburetion Day, Timothy S. Vail, 19, of Indianapolis, was driving in the infamous "Snake Pit", the area in the turn one section of the infield where the finishing turns of the road course for cars and the opening turns of the road course for motorcycles are now. He attempted to avoid a large puddle of mud and his vehicle overturned. Vail died of a fractured skull. His passenger David A. Stegenmiller, 19, of Indianapolis, was thrown from the vehicle, and sustained slight injuries.
Gordon Smiley	Driver	May 15, 1982	USAC	Indianapolis 500	Qualifying	On his second warm-up lap, Gordon Smiley's car began to oversteer while rounding the third turn, causing the car to slightly slide. When Smiley steered right to correct this, the front wheels gained grip suddenly, sending his car directly across the track and into the wall nose first at nearly 200 mph (320 km/h). The impact shattered the March chassis, which completely disintegrated, causing the fuel tank to explode, and sent debris — as well as Smiley's exposed body — tumbling hundreds of feet across the short-chute connecting turns three and four. Smiley died instantly from massive trauma.
Lyle Kurtenbach	Spectator	May 24, 1987	USAC	Indianapolis 500	Race	On lap 130, Tony Bettenhausen Jr. lost a wheel in the third turn. Moments later, Roberto Guerrero hit the tire with his nose cone, launching it into the air. The tire went over the catch fence, and into the top row of the "K" grandstand (where the current North Vista stand is located), striking in the head Lyle G. Kurtenbach, 41, of Rothschild, Wisconsin. Kurtenbach died in Methodist Hospital at 1:46 p.m.
Stephen White	Trespasser	May 29, 1991				Three days after the 1991 race, Stephen C. White, 31, of Indianapolis, entered the grounds of the speedway early on Wednesday, May 29. At some point before 7:30 a.m., he started driving around the track in a GMC pickup truck. He completed three or four laps, approaching speeds of 100 mph (160 km/h). In an attempt to stop White, Luther Wray, a foreman in the speedway's maintenance department, parked a Dodge Caravan minivan on the track near the start-finish line. White was driving approximately 90 mph (140 km/h) when he struck the van. The impact launched the truck into the air, traveling approximately 150 feet (46 m) before landing. White was pronounced dead upon arrival at Methodist Hospital.
Jovy Marcelo	Driver	May 15, 1992	USAC	Indianapolis 500	Practice	Jovy Marcelo's car snapped around at warmup speed and impacted on the right side entering turn one at 172 mph (277 km/h). Marcelo was killed instantly by a basilar skull fracture.
Scott Brayton	Driver	May 17, 1996	USAC	Indianapolis 500	Practice	Scott Brayton had won the pole position for the 1996 Indy 500 on Saturday, May 11. At 12:17 p.m. on Friday, May 17, Brayton, testing a back-up car, did a half-spin in the middle of turn two, the car scrubbing off almost no speed as it spun. Its left side impacted the wall at over 200 mph (320 km/h), and the force was such that Brayton's head also impacted the wall. The car slid 600 feet (180 m) to a stop down the backstretch. The driver was found unconscious in the car, and was transported immediately to Methodist Hospital. He was pronounced dead at 12:50 p.m. EST, having been killed instantly by a basilar skull fracture. It was determined that Brayton likely ran over a piece of debris in turn four or on the main stretch, which punctured his right rear tire. Unaware of the debris, he completed the lap at 228.606 mph (367.906 km/h), then drove into turn one. The tire suffered rapid deflation in turn two, causing the car to go out of control.
Tony Renna	Driver	October 22, 2003	IRL	Firestone tire test	Firestone tire test	Tony Renna had just recently signed with Chip Ganassi Racing for the 2004 season. Firestone was conducting an end of season tire test for the 2004 race on October 21–22, 2003. Reigning series champion Scott Dixon completed the first day of testing without incident, and the Ganassi team was changing the car over for Renna in order for him to test on the second day that evening. On the second day, it was about 50 °F (10 °C) air temperature, and the track surface cool. On Renna's fourth lap, he was driving approximately 218 mph (351 km/h) and spun out in turn three. While spinning, his car caught air underneath the chassis, which lifted into the air, and into the catch fence. Renna died instantly of massive internal trauma, and was pronounced DOA at Methodist Hospital in Indianapolis. The exact cause of the spin was unknown, and damage was observed to have been inflicted to the grandstand seating (which was vacant) in the immediate vicinity of the impact area. The investigation into this crash led to series regulations on minimum ambient and surface temperatures and a requirement that cameras be active at all times when there is a test, practice, qualifying, or race session.
Art Morris	Safety crew member	August 6, 2004	NASCAR	Brickyard 400		Arthur E. Morris, 64, of Anderson, Indiana, was a 20-year Safety Patrol seasonal employee. In the infield at approximately 7:30 a.m. on a practice day, he had a heart attack causing him to crash his motor scooter into a concrete wall. Having sustained head and arm injuries, Morris was admitted to Methodist Hospital where he was pronounced dead at 10:30 a.m.
Peter Lenz	Rider	August 29, 2010	AMA/USGPRU	Rev'It Moriwaki MD250H	Race	On the warm-up lap of race two of the USGPRU Moriwaki MD250H Powered by Honda championship event, Peter Lenz, 13, lost grip in the front when the motorcycle contacted the curbing at the exit of Turn 4 in the motorcycle layout (the exit of the Snake Pit, which is Turns 1-4 for motorcycles or Turns 12-14 for cars), resulting in a low-side crash. The motorcycle fell on the left, while Lenz slid, sat upright, and waved to warn riders. Two riders were extremely close during the formation lap, causing Xavier Zayat, 12, to not see Lenz, leading to a collision between Zayat's motorcycle and Lenz. Paramedics immediately placed Lenz into a cervical collar, intubated him, and performed CPR. He later died of his injuries in Methodist Hospital. Zayat subsequently won the 2015 Nicky Hayden Award for road racing and retired in 2022, attending Yale University.

== See also ==
- List of IndyCar fatalities
- List of driver deaths in motorsport
