= 1930 AAA Championship Car season =

Auto racing season

- AAA National Championship Trail

Season
- Races: 8
- Start date: May 3
- End date: September 6

Awards
- National champion: (United States) Billy Arnold
- Indianapolis 500 winner: (United States) Billy Arnold

The 1930 AAA Championship Car season consisted of eight races, beginning in Langhorne, Pennsylvania, on May 3, and concluding in Syracuse, New York, on September 6. The AAA National Champion and Indianapolis 500 winner was Billy Arnold.

Two riding mechanics died during the season. Paul Marshall, at the Indianapolis 500; and William Berry, who died at Detroit during qualifying.

== Schedule and results ==
All races running on Dirt/Brick/Board Oval.

Rnd	Date	Race name	Track	Location	Type	Pole position	Winning driver
1	May 3	(United States) Langhorne Race - 100	Langhorne Speedway	Langhorne, Pennsylvania	Dirt	(United States) Bill Cummings	(United States) Bill Cummings
2	May 30	(United States) International 500 Mile Sweepstakes	Indianapolis Motor Speedway	Speedway, Indiana	Brick	(United States) Billy Arnold	(United States) Billy Arnold
3	June 9	(United States) Detroit Race - 100	Michigan State Fairgrounds	Detroit, Michigan	Dirt	(United States) Chet Gardner	(United States) Wilbur Shaw
4	June 14	(United States) Altoona Race 1 - 200	Altoona Speedway	Tyrone, Pennsylvania	Board	(United States) Billy Arnold	(United States) Billy Arnold
5	June 22	(United States) Akron Race - 100	Akron Speedway	Northampton Township, Ohio	Board	(United States) Wilbur Shaw	(United States) Shorty Cantlon
6	July 4	(United States) Bridgeville Race - 100	Bridgeville Speedway	Bridgeville, Pennsylvania	Board	(United States) Shorty Cantlon	(United States) Wilbur Shaw
7	September 1	(United States) Altoona Race 2 - 200^{A}	Altoona Speedway	Tyrone, Pennsylvania	Board	(United States) Billy Arnold	(United States) Billy Arnold
8	September 6	(United States) Syracuse Race - 100	New York State Fairgrounds	Syracuse, New York	Dirt	(United States) Billy Arnold	(United States) Bill Cummings

^A Scheduled for 200 miles, stopped early due to rain on lap 93.

== Final points standings ==
- Note 1: Drivers had to be running at the finish to score points. Points scored by drivers sharing a ride were split according to percentage of race driven. Starters were not allowed to score points as relief drivers, if a race starter finished the race in another car, in a points scoring position, those points were awarded to the driver who had started the car.
- Note 2: Louis Schneider was ineligible for points.
- The final standings based on reference.

Pos	Driver	LAN (United States)	INDY (United States)	DET (United States)	ALT1 (United States)	AKR (United States)	BRV (United States)	ALT2 (United States)	SYR (United States)	Pts
1	(United States) Billy Arnold		**1***	14	**1***	4	7	**1***	**10**	1027.5
2	(United States) Shorty Cantlon		2	12	4	1*	**12**	3	3	653
3	(United States) Bill Cummings RY	**1***	5	3				4	1	650.4
4	(United States) Russ Snowberger	14	8	2	12	2	2	5	11	489.7
5	(United States) Deacon Litz	2	30	2		DNP		2	2	464.6
6	(United States) Wilbur Shaw	7	22	1	7	**7**	1*	DNQ	DNQ	385.2
7	(United States) Louis Meyer		4					8	15	384.9
8	(United States) Dave Evans		6			DNP	4			320
9	(United States) Frank Farmer	12	21	11	3	6		DNQ	5	270
10	(United States) Herman Schurch	10	2		4					240
11	(United States) Phil Shafer		7							200
12	(United States) Zeke Meyer	6	16	9	6	8		DNQ	7	190
13	(United States) Bert Karnatz					5	3		DNQ	140
14	(United States) Frank Brisko	5					8	6		140
15	(United States) William Gardner		23		5			10	DNQ	131.6
16	(United States) Freddie Winnai	3	5		11					131
17	(United States) Mel Kenealy R		17		9	9	9	6		118.1
18	(United States) Stubby Stubblefield R		9	7			DNQ	11	4	113
19	(United States) Lou Moore		27		8	DNQ		7	DNQ	106.5
20	(United States) Chet Gardner		38	**13**	13	3			14	80
21	(United States) Ernie Triplett		15	4	16	DNQ				70
22	(United States) Bill Albertson	4								70
23	(United States) Gene Haustein R					4	11		DNQ	62
24	(United States) Ralph Sloan R					10	5			60
25	(United States) Chet Miller R		13	5		15	DNP			60
26	(United States) Paul Bost		13				6	DNQ	DNQ	50
27	(United States) Luther Johnson R			6						50
28	(United States) L. L. Corum		10							50
29	(United States) Phil Pardee							9	9	43.2
30	(United States) Fred Lecklider		9							32
31	(United States) Fred Frame	8							13	30
32	(United States) Gordon Condon								8	30
33	(United States) Jimmy Gleason	9	29		14		10	12	DNQ	30
34	(United States) Leslie Allen R		9							25
-	(United States) Louis Schneider	7	3	10	11		DNP	DNQ	DNQ	0
-	(United States) Babe Stapp		31	8	10	DNQ				0
-	(United States) Henry Turgeon R	11								0
-	(United States) Claude Berton R		11							0
-	(Kingdom of Italy) Letterio Cucinotta R		12							0
-	(United States) George Young R								12	0
-	(United States) Al Stewart R	13								0
-	(United States) Harry Butcher R		14							0
-	(United States) Ralph DePalma	15								0
-	(United States) Johnny Krieger R		18			DNQ				0
-	(Canada) J. C. McDonald R		18							0
-	(United States) Tony Gulotta		19		DNP					0
-	(United States) Roland Free R		20							0
-	(United States) Ted Chamberlain R		23							0
-	(United States) Joe Huff R		23							0
-	(United States) Joe Caccia R		24							0
-	(United States) Rick Decker		24							0
-	(United States) Bill Denver R		25					DNQ		0
-	(United States) Cy Marshall		26							0
-	(United States) Charles Moran R		28							0
-	(United States) Johnny Seymour		32							0
-	(United States) Peter DePaolo		33							0
-	(United States) Fred Roberts		33							0
-	(United States) Marion Trexler		34							0
-	(Kingdom of Italy) Baconin Borzacchini R		37							0
-	(Kingdom of Italy) Giovanni Rossi		37							0
-	(United States) Julius Slade		DNS							0
-	(United States) Doc MacKenzie		DNQ	DNQ						0
-	(United States) Paul Rice							DNQ	DNQ	0
-	(United States) Al Aspen	DNQ								0
-	(United States) Fred Fansin		DNQ							0
-	(Argentina) Juan Gaudino		DNQ							0
-	(United States) Sam Grecco		DNQ							0
-	(United States) James Klemos		DNQ							0
-	(United States) Walt May		DNQ							0
-	(United States) Bill Lindau						DNQ			0
-	(United States) Sam Frizzell								DNQ	0
-	(United States) Myron Fults								DNQ	0
-	(United States) Charles Ganung								DNQ	0
-	(United States) Hap Ray								DNQ	0
-	(United States) Horace Shaw								DNQ	0
-	(United States) Howard Shields								DNQ	0
-	(United States) Archie Waterman								DNQ	0
Pos	Driver	LAN (United States)	INDY (United States)	DET (United States)	ALT1 (United States)	AKR (United States)	BRV (United States)	ALT2 (United States)	SYR (United States)	Pts

Color	Result
Gold	Winner
Silver	2nd place
Bronze	3rd place
Green	4th & 5th place
Light Blue	6th-10th place
Dark Blue	Finished (Outside Top 10)
Purple	Did not finish (Ret)
Red	Did not qualify (DNQ)
Brown	Withdrawn (Wth)
Black	Disqualified (DSQ)
White	Did not start (DNS)
Blank	Did not participate (DNP)
Blank	Not competing

**In-line notation**
**Bold**	Pole position
Italics	Ran fastest race lap
*	Led most race laps
Rookie of the Year
Rookie

== See also ==
- 1930 Indianapolis 500
