= Rick Decker =

Rick Decker is the name of:

- Rick Decker (As the World Turns), a fictional character on the television series As the World Turns
- Rick Decker (racing driver) (1903–1966), automobile racer who competed in the Indianapolis 500, 1929–1934
