= Cucinotta =

Cucinotta is an Italian surname. Notable people with the surname include:

- Annalisa Cucinotta (born 1986), Italian cyclist
- Claudio Cucinotta (born 1982), Italian cyclist
- Franco Cucinotta (born 1952), Italian footballer
- Letterio Cucinotta (1902–1987), Italian racing driver
- Maria Grazia Cucinotta (born 1968), Italian actress
