= Charles Moran (racing driver) =

American racing driver (1906–1978)

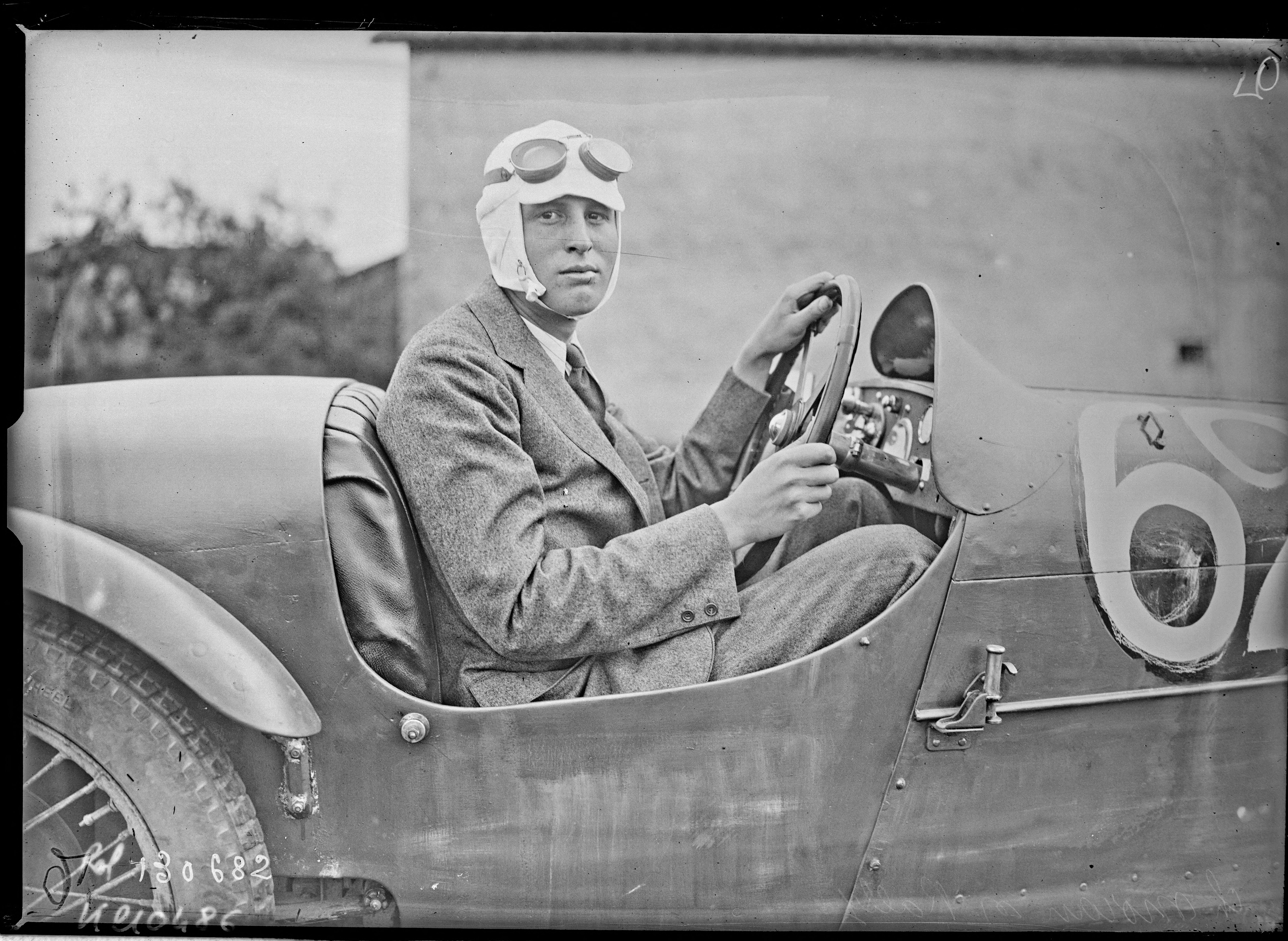
- Born: Charles J. Moran Jr. May 27, 1906 New York, New York, U.S.
- Died: June 7, 1978 (aged 72) Teasdale, Utah, U.S.

Champ Car career
- 1 race run over 2 years
- First race: 1930 Indianapolis 500 (Indianapolis)
Wins	Podiums	Poles
0	0	0

24 Hours of Le Mans career
- Years: 1929, 1951–1953
- Teams: Du Pont, privateer, Cunningham
- Best finish: 10th (1953)
- Class wins: 0

Charles J. Moran Jr. (May 27, 1906 – June 7, 1978) was an American racing driver and official.

== Early life ==
Moran was born in New York City, son of Charles Moran, a naval historian, and Martha Adams. He attended St. George's School in Middletown, Rhode Island, and Princeton University before graduating from Columbia University.

== Career ==
In 1928, driving a "Rally" (Automobiles Rally - Colombes), Moran finished fourth in the 24-hour race at St. Germain-en-Laye (France) the "VII° Bol d'Or" driving the full 24 hours without relief. For the next year and a half, he campaigned this car in Spa, San Sebastian, Madrid, Geisberg. He was the first American to race at Le Mans in 1929, in a DuPont, with co-driver Alfredo Jose Miranda; he raced the same car at Indianapolis in 1930 with George Reed in the mechanics seat.

In 1932, Moran gave up racing, joined DuPont Motors as an engineer, and then moved to a related enterprise, the brokerage firm of Francis I. DuPont, where he became managing partner in the 1950s. In 1949, he resumed racing, this time in sports cars (Bugatti, MGs, Cunninghams, AC Bristol, Lotus, and Ferrari) in Sports Car Club of America (SCCA) events and again at Le Mans, with his Ferrari 212 (1951, finishing 16th, 1952 DNF) and with his Cunningham C4Rx coupe, co-driver John Gordon Bennett (1953, finishing 10th).

Moran became secretary of the SCCA in 1952-3 and president in 1954-5. He was a member of the Commission Sportive Internationale and the American representative at the Fédération Internationale de l'Automobile.

In 1956, the American Automobile Association ended its relationship as the sole motorsport organization affiliated with the Fédération Internationale de l'Automobile, which governed international racing. As a result, the U.S. no longer had an association with FIA, hence no international racing licenses could be issued, no international landspeed records could be certified, nor could US events be FIA sanctioned, which would put international drivers competing in them at risk of losing their FIA licenses. Only Indianapolis and Sebring retained their FIA licenses.

Moran took it upon himself to organize the Automobile Competition Committee for the United States (ACCUS) to overcome rivalries between SCCA, United States Auto Club, and NASCAR and have one umbrella entity to work with the FIA. He became the first president of ACCUS and managed it skillfully in its early years and led the negotiating with the FIA for US affiliation. FIA recognized ACCUS in 1957.

Moran chaired the board of trustees at St. George's School 1958-62.

== Personal life ==
In February 1936, he married Josephine D. Taylor, daughter of David H. Taylor of 875 Park Avenue in New York City. Together, they had two children:

- Charles Moran III (b. 1936), who served in the OSS in England and France in 1944-5.
- David Taylor Moran (b. 1940)

He later married Hesteranne Primrose Butz; they had three children:

- Martha Adams Moran (b. 1962)
- Amedee Depau Moran (b. 1963)
- Helen Moran

Moran died on June 7, 1978, in Teasdale, Utah.

== Motorsports career results ==
=== Indianapolis 500 results ===
Year	Car	Start	Qualified	Rank	Finished	Laps	Led	Retired
1930	32	19	89.733	36	27	22	0	Crash T3
Totals						22	0	

=== 24 Hours of Le Mans results ===
Year	Team	Co-Driver	Car	Class	Laps	Pos.	Class Pos.
1929	(United States) Du Pont Motor Co.	(United States) Alfredo Miranda Jr.	Du Pont Model G Speedster	8.0	20	DNF	DNF
1951	(United States) Charles Moran Jr	(Italy) Franco Cornacchia	Ferrari 212 Export Spyder	S 3.0	227	16th	7th
1952	(United States) Charles Moran Jr.	(Italy) Franco Cornacchia	Ferrari 212 MM	S 3.0		DNF (12hr)	
1953	(United States) Briggs Cunningham	(United States) John Gordon Bennet	Cunningham C-4RK	S 8.0	269	10th	3rd
