= Cy Marshall =

American racing driver (1902–1974)

- Born: Cyrus Caswell Marshall; April 17, 1902 Kansas City, Missouri, U.S.
- Died: December 20, 1974 (aged 72) Volusia, Florida, U.S.

Champ Car career
- 2 races run over 3 years
- Best finish: 20th (1947)
- First race: 1930 Indianapolis 500 (Indianapolis)
- Last race: 1947 Indianapolis 500 (Indianapolis)
Wins	Podiums	Poles
0	0	0

Cyrus Caswell Marshall (April 17, 1902 – December 20, 1974) was an American racing driver. Marshall was seriously injured and his riding mechanic, brother Paul Marshall, was killed in the 1930 Indy 500. He returned to the race in 1947. The 17 years between starts was a record he shared with Roland Free, who also competed in only the 1930 and 1947 races, until it was broken by Jacques Villeneuve, who competed in the 2014 race after having last competed in the 1995 race. Marshall also failed to qualify for the 1950 race.

== Motorsports career results ==
=== Indianapolis 500 results ===
Year	Car	Start	Qual	Rank	Finish	Laps	Led	Retired
1930	36	10	100.846	16	26	29	0	Crash T3
1947	34	28	115.644	30	8	197	0	Flagged
Totals						226	0	

Starts	2
Poles	0
Front Row	0
Wins	0
Top 5	0
Top 10	1
Retired	1
