= Mel Kenealy =

American racing driver (1903–1985)

- Born: Melvin Hartley Kenealy; May 17, 1903 Denver, Colorado, U.S.
- Died: June 29, 1985 (aged 82) Lakewood, California, U.S.

Championship titles
- AAA West Coast Big Car (1929)

Champ Car career
- 5 races run over 1 year
- Best finish: 17th (1930)
- First race: 1930 Indianapolis 500 (Indianapolis)
- Last race: 1930 Altoona 200 #2 (Altoona)
Wins	Podiums	Poles
0	0	0

Melvin Hartley Kenealy (May 17, 1903 – June 29, 1985) was an American racing driver. Kenealy was one of the top drivers on the AAA Pacific Southwest circuit during the late 1920s-early 1930s. He made five career AAA Championship starts, all in the 1930 season.

== Motorsports career results ==
=== Indianapolis 500 results ===
Year	Car	Start	Qual	Rank	Finish	Laps	Led	Retired
1930	10	23	103.327	12	15	114	0	Valve
Totals						114	0	

Starts	1
Poles	0
Front Row	0
Wins	0
Top 5	0
Top 10	0
Retired	1
