= Marion Trexler =

American racing driver (1891–1968)

- Born: Marion Monroe Trexler; January 19, 1891 Indianapolis, Indiana, U.S.
- Died: February 29, 1968 (aged 77) Murray, Kentucky, U.S.

Champ Car career
- 2 races run over 4 years
- First race: 1912 Columbus 200 (Columbus)
- Last race: 1930 Indianapolis 500 (Indianapolis)
Wins	Podiums	Poles
0	0	0

Marion Monroe Trexler (January 19, 1891 – February 29, 1968) was an American racing driver.

== Indianapolis 500 results ==
Year	Car	Start	Qual	Rank	Finish	Laps	Led	Retired
1930	45	29	92.978	32	34	19	0	Crash T3
Totals						19	0	

Starts	1
Poles	0
Front Row	0
Wins	0
Top 5	0
Top 10	0
Retired	1
