= Leslie Allen (racing driver) =

American racing driver (1892–1946)

- Born: Leslie Charles Allen; March 5, 1892 Odell, Illinois, U.S.
- Died: May 19, 1946 (aged 54) Chicago, Illinois, U.S.

Champ Car career
- 1 race run over 2 years
- Best finish: 34th (1930)
- First race: 1930 Indianapolis 500 (Indianapolis)
Wins	Podiums	Poles
0	0	0

Leslie Charles "Bugs" Allen (March 5, 1892 – May 19, 1946) was an American racing driver.

== Career ==
Allen first found racing success as a record-setting and "fearless" motorcycle racer. He suffered a "severe scalp wound" in a 1913 on-track collision in Rockford, Illinois.

Allen moved into auto racing after surviving an accident in motorcycle racing. His rivalry with driver Cliff Woodbury was promoted in press reports. He drove a Frontenac to win and break records at Roby Speedway and Bedford Speedway in Indiana in 1924 and 1925, and at Thornton Speedway in 1926. He attempted to qualify for the 1927 Indianapolis 500 but failed to qualify. He successfully qualified for the 1930 Indianapolis 500 driving a Miller and started and finished ninth. He was described as "the last word in daredevil drivers" in 1928. He won a race at Evanston Speedway in 1933.

== Motorsports career results ==
=== Indianapolis 500 results ===
Year	Car	Start	Qual	Rank	Finish	Laps	Led	Retired
1930	25	9	101.919	14	9	200	0	Running
Totals						200	0	

Starts	1
Poles	0
Front Row	0
Wins	0
Top 5	0
Top 10	1
Retired	0
