= Frank Farmer (racing driver) =

American racing driver (1901–1932)

- Born: Frank Marian Farmer; September 18, 1901 Harts, West Virginia, U.S.
- Died: August 28, 1932 (aged 30) Perth Amboy, New Jersey, U.S.

Champ Car career
- 10 races run over 6 years
- Best finish: 9th (1930)
- First race: 1928 Syracuse 100 (Syracuse)
- Last race: 1932 Syracuse 100 (Syracuse)
| Wins | Podiums | Poles |
|---|---|---|
| 0 | 1 | 0 |

Frank Marian Farmer (September 18, 1901 – August 28, 1932) was an American racing driver. Farmer made ten Championship Car starts in his career with a best finish of third in the June 1930 race at Altoona Speedway. He was killed in a crash at Woodbridge Speedway.

== Motorsports career results ==
=== Indianapolis 500 results ===
| Year | Car | Start | Qual | Rank | Finish | Laps | Led | Retired |
|---|---|---|---|---|---|---|---|---|
| 1929 | 36 | 26 | 107.972 | 24 | 14 | 140 | 0 | Supercharger |
| 1930 | 33 | 11 | 100.615 | 17 | 21 | 69 | 0 | Crash |
| 1931 | 35 | 22 | 108.303 | 17 | 32 | 32 | 0 | Rod bearing |
| Totals | | | | | | 241 | 0 | |

| Starts | 3 |
| Poles | 0 |
| Front Row | 0 |
| Wins | 0 |
| Top 5 | 0 |
| Top 10 | 0 |
| Retired | 3 |
