= J. C. McDonald =

Canadian racing driver (1902–1966)

- Born: John Charles MacDonald; December 23, 1902 Pictou, Nova Scotia, Canada
- Died: May 11, 1966 (aged 63) Yuba City, California, U.S.

Champ Car career
- 1 race run over 1 year
- First race: 1930 Indianapolis 500 (Indianapolis)
Wins	Podiums	Poles
0	0	0

John Charles MacDonald (known as J. C. McDonald, December 23, 1902 – May 11, 1966) was a Canadian racing driver who lived in South Bend, Indiana. The 1930 Indianapolis 500 was his only AAA Championship Car start. He drove a Studebaker "special" that he designed and built.

== Motorsports career results ==
=== Indianapolis 500 results ===
Year	Car	Start	Qual	Rank	Finish	Laps	Led	Retired
1930	35	13	98.953	21	18	112	0	Fuel tank leak
Totals						112	0	

Starts	1
Poles	0
Front Row	0
Wins	0
Top 5	0
Top 10	0
Retired	1
