= Claude Berton =

American racing driver (1903–1993)

- Born: Claude Frederick Berton; January 16, 1903 Medford, Massachusetts, U.S.
- Died: February 28, 1993 (aged 90) Daytona Beach, Florida, U.S.

Champ Car career
- 1 race run over 2 years
- First race: 1930 Indianapolis 500 (Indianapolis)
| Wins | Podiums | Poles |
|---|---|---|
| 0 | 0 | 0 |

Claude Frederick Berton (January 16, 1903 – February 28, 1993) was an American racing driver.

== Motorsports career results ==
=== Indianapolis 500 results ===
| Year | Car | Start | Qual | Rank | Finish | Laps | Led | Retired |
|---|---|---|---|---|---|---|---|---|
| 1930 | 38 | 16 | 95.087 | 28 | 11 | 196 | 0 | Flagged |
| Totals | | | | | | 196 | 0 | |

| Starts | 1 |
| Poles | 0 |
| Front Row | 0 |
| Wins | 0 |
| Top 5 | 0 |
| Top 10 | 0 |
| Retired | 0 |
