= Carl Limberg =

American racing driver (1883–1916)

- Born: Carl August Limberg; July 6, 1883 Mount Auburn, Iowa, U.S.
- Died: May 13, 1916 (aged 32) Brooklyn, New York, U.S.

Champ Car career
- 7 races run over 5 years
- First race: 1910 Vanderbilt Cup (Long Island)
- Last race: 1916 Metropolitan Trophy (Sheepshead Bay)
Wins	Podiums	Poles
0	0	0

Carl August Limberg (July 6, 1883 – May 13, 1916) was an American racing driver who was killed during a AAA-sanctioned national championship race.

== Biography ==
Limberg was born in Mount Auburn, Iowa on July 6, 1886. He grew up in San Jose, California, where he became a bicycle racer, participating in endurance competitions across the United States. In 1908, Limberg moved to Brooklyn, New York and started auto racing in 1910. He was employed by Delage.

== Death ==
On May 13, 1916, Limberg competed in the Metropolitan Trophy, a 150-mile AAA-sanctioned national championship race held at Sheepshead Bay Speedway before 25,000 spectators. Driving car No. 6, he was in the lead on lap 15 when the right rear tire came off his Delage. Limberg's car hit the rail on the eastern embankment; tumbling off of the track, both Limberg and his riding mechanic, Roxie Pallotti, fell to the ground 50 feet (15 m) below. Both men died of their injuries.
