= Letterio Cucinotta =

Italian racing driver (1902–1987)

- Born: Letterio Mario Cucinotta; 27 March 1902 Pace del Mela, Sicily, Italy
- Died: 9 October 1987 (aged 85) Messina, Sicily, Italy

Champ Car career
- 1 race run over 1 year
- First race: 1930 Indianapolis 500 (Indianapolis)
Wins	Podiums	Poles
0	0	0

Letterio Mario Cucinotta (27 March 1902 – 9 October 1987) was an Italian racing driver who participated in the 1930 Indianapolis 500.

== Biography ==
According to Indianapolis Motor Speedway historian Donald Davidson, very little is known about Cucinotta, who was from Messina, Italy, and drove with his own Maserati (sent at his own expense from Italy), but not for the team. He made only one appearance at Indianapolis, and is not known to have participated in any other American major automobile races. He was given the nickname "Piccolo Pete" by the crowd.

Cucinotta participated in many Italian races like Targa Florio, Tripoli Grand Prix and Coppa Acerbo. He was born in 1902 and died in 1987. His best overall score was a second place at the 1928 Coppa Messina, held on a 52-km road circuit in Sicily, and a class win at the 1926 Coppa Vinci driving an 1100 cc S.A.M. voiturette, also held at Messina. After the war, Cucinotta continued racing until 1964.

== Motorsports career results ==
=== Indianapolis 500 results ===
Year	Car	Start	Qual	Rank	Finish	Laps	Led	Retired
1930	42	30	91.584	34	12	185	0	Flagged
Totals						185	0	

Starts	1
Poles	0
Front Row	0
Wins	0
Top 5	0
Top 10	0
Retired	0
