= Joe Caccia =

American racing driver (1899–1931)

- Born: Giuseppe Caccia; January 19, 1899 Naples, Campania, Italy
- Died: May 26, 1931 (aged 32) Speedway, Indiana, U.S.

Champ Car career
- 1 race run over 2 years
- First race: 1930 Indianapolis 500 (Indianapolis)
Wins	Podiums	Poles
0	0	0

Joseph Caccia (born Giuseppe Caccia, January 19, 1899 – May 26, 1931) was an American racing driver.

== Biography ==
Caccia and his family immigrated to the U.S. when he was a young boy, settling in Pennsylvania. He was killed in a practice crash for the 1931 Indianapolis 500 along with riding mechanic Clarence Grove, when he crashed his car at turn 2, causing it to vault a wall, hit a tree, and catch on fire.

== Motorsports career results ==
=== Indianapolis 500 results ===
Year	Car	Start	Qual	Rank	Finish	Laps	Led	Retired
1930	29	14	97.606	22	25	43	0	Crash
Totals						43	0	

Starts	1
Poles	0
Front Row	0
Wins	0
Top 5	0
Top 10	0
Retired	1
