= Rollie Free =

American motorcycle racer (1900–1984)

- Free riding in minimal clothing during his record-breaking run in 1948
- Born: Roland Robert Free; November 18, 1900 Chicago, Illinois, U.S.
- Died: October 11, 1984 (aged 83) Los Angeles, California, U.S.

Champ Car career
- 2 races run over 3 years
- First race: 1930 Indianapolis 500 (Indianapolis)
- Last race: 1947 Indianapolis 500 (Indianapolis)
Wins	Podiums	Poles
0	0	0

Roland Robert Free (November 18, 1900 – October 11, 1984) was an American motorcycle and automobile racer best known for breaking the American motorcycle land-speed record in 1948 on the Bonneville Salt Flats, Utah. A picture of Free, prone and wearing a bathing suit, has been described as the most famous picture in motorcycling.

== Biography ==
After an early career in motorcycle retail, Free became a regional racer of the 1920s and 30s on Indian motorcycles. In 1923, Free tried out for his first national motorcycle race, the 100-Mile National Championships on the board track in Kansas City, but did not qualify. He developed his career in longer-distance events, and raced in the first Daytona 200 on the Daytona Beach Road Course in 1937. He also set several American Motorcyclist Association Class C speed records including a 111.55 mph (179.52 km/h) run at Daytona in 1938 on an Indian Chief that he had tuned himself.

Free joined the Army Air Force as an aircraft maintenance officer during the Second World War; during this time, he was stationed at Hill Field in Utah, where he first saw the Bonneville Salt Flats. In 1945, Free left the Air Force and resumed racing on Indian motorcycles in long-distance and sprint record attempts, as well as dirt track racing on Triumphs.

On the morning of September 13, 1948, Free raised the American motorcycle speed record by riding the very first Vincent HRD, owned by the California sportsman John Edgar and sponsored by Mobil Oil, to a speed of 150.313 mph (241.905 km/h). Special features included the first-ever Vincent use of a rear shock absorber, the first Mk II racing cams, and horizontally mounted racing carburetors. Free adopted a style used by other racers, such as Norman Teleford, of lying flat on the machine's seat, thereby minimizing wind resistance and moving its center of gravity rearward.

To protect himself and allow comfort when in such a position, Free had developed special protective clothing. However, when his leathers tore from early runs at 147 mph (237 km/h), he discarded them and made a final attempt without a jacket, pants, gloves, boots, or helmet. Free lay flat on the motorcycle wearing only a bathing suit, a shower cap, and a pair of borrowed sneakers – inspired by his friend Ed Kretz. This resulted not only in the record, but also produced one of the most famous photographs in motorcycling history, the "bathing suit bike." The photo was taken from a car driven parallel to his run on the Bonneville Salt Flats.

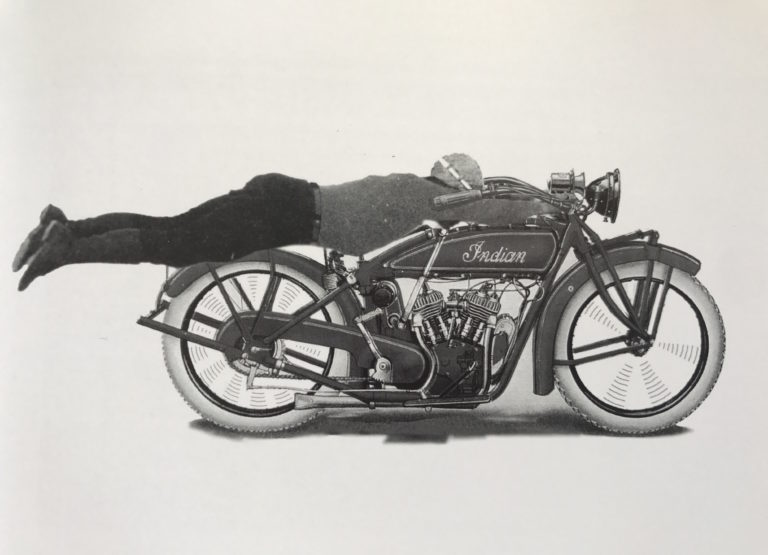
Rollie Free on an Indian motorcycle in 1920

It is debated whether the exact model of motorcycle was a Black Lightning or Black Shadow. Most believe that it was a custom ordered Black Lightning, as it was some 100 pounds lighter and 25 hp (19 kW) more powerful than a stock Black Shadow. In one of his books, Phil Irving (one of the designers) said that there were only about 16 of the model produced.

The Vincent used is sometimes mistaken for a Series B machine, having the stamp BB on its engine casing, but is actually a works-modified machine, and has been recognized as the first, or prototype of 30 Lightnings. The bike remained racing in the United States until the mid-1960s, and then resided virtually intact in the private collection of Herb Harris of Austin, Texas. The bike was sold from the Harris collection in November 2010 for a rumored $1.1 million, which would be one of the highest prices ever paid privately for a motorcycle.

Free later moved to California and, after his racing career faded, worked in the auto servicing industry. He died in 1984 and was posthumously inducted into the Motorcycle Hall of Fame in 1998.

== Motorsports career results ==
=== Indianapolis 500 results ===
Year	Car	Start	Qual	Rank	Finish	Laps	Led	Retired
1930	28	37	89.639	37	19	69	0	Clutch
1947	42	12	119.526	23	17	87	0	Spun
Totals						156	0	

Starts	2
Poles	0
Front Row	0
Wins	0
Top 5	0
Top 10	0
Retired	2
