= Bill Denver =

American racing driver (1901–1933)

- Born: Eura Denver Orem; June 12, 1901 Ravenswood, West Virginia, U.S.
- Died: May 28, 1933 (aged 31) Indianapolis, Indiana, U.S.

Champ Car career
- 5 races run over 3 years
- Best finish: 26th (1931)
- First race: 1930 Indianapolis 500 (Indianapolis)
- Last race: 1931 Syracuse 100 (Syracuse)
Wins	Podiums	Poles
0	0	0

Eura Denver Orem (June 12, 1901 – May 28, 1933) was an American racing driver who competed under the nom de course Bill Denver. He and his riding mechanic, Bob Hurst, died from injuries sustained during a qualification run for the 1933 Indianapolis 500.

== Motorsports career results ==
=== Indianapolis 500 results ===
Year	Car	Start	Qual	Rank	Finish	Laps	Led	Retired
1930	44	35	90.650	35	22	41	0	Rod
Totals						41	0	

Starts	1
Poles	0
Front Row	0
Wins	0
Top 5	0
Top 10	0
Retired	1
