= 1930 Indianapolis 500 =

American motor race

18th Indianapolis 500

Indianapolis Motor Speedway

Indianapolis 500
- Sanctioning body: AAA
- Date: May 30, 1930
- Winner: Billy Arnold
- Winning Riding Mechanic: Spider Matlock
- Winning Entrant: Harry Hartz
- Winning time: 4:58:39.72
- Average speed: 100.448 mph (161.655 km/h)
- Pole position: Billy Arnold
- Pole speed: 113.268 mph (182.287 km/h)
- Most laps led: Billy Arnold (198)

Pre-race
- Pace car: Cord L-29
- Pace car driver: Wade Morton
- Starter: Grantland Rice
- Honorary referee: Vincent Hugo Bendix
- Estimated attendance: 165,000-170,000

Chronology
Previous	Next
1929	1931

The 18th International 500-Mile Sweepstakes Race was held at the Indianapolis Motor Speedway on Friday, May 30, 1930. The race was part of the 1930 AAA Championship Car season.

Pole position winner Billy Arnold took the lead on lap 3, and led the entire rest of the race. He led a total of 198 laps (all consecutive), which stands as an all-time Indianapolis 500 race record. Arnold was accompanied by riding mechanic Spider Matlock.

Arnold was the first driver to complete the entire 500 miles in under five hours (over 100 mph average speed) without relief help. Pete DePaolo finished the 1925 race in under five hours, but used a relief driver for 21 laps. Arnold would eventually be named the first member of the prestigious 100 mph Club.

The race was marred by the death of Paul Marshall. He was acting as riding mechanic for his brother Cy when their car hit and flipped over the wall. His brother survived with serious injuries.

== Rules changes and the "Junk" formula ==
The 1930 race ushered in a series of substantially new engine rules and specifications. The allotted displacement was increased from 91 1/2 cu. in. (1.5 L) to 366 cu. in. (6.0 L). Superchargers were banned with the exception of two-cycle engines, and riding mechanics were made mandatory once again. In addition, the traditional mandate of a maximum 33-car field was lifted. This rules package would be in place through 1937.

Contrary to popular belief, the rule changes were not made in response to the stock market crash of 1929. The rules package is sometimes referred to disparagingly as the "Junk Formula" or the "Junkyard," and a common misconception is that it was implemented in order to dumb down the cars and maintain full fields during the Great Depression.

Speedway president Eddie Rickenbacker sought to make the changes in order to lure back the passenger car manufacturers, and make the cars on the track more resemble those sold to the motoring public. Rickenbacker's desire was to move away from the supercharged, specialized racing machines that had taken over the Speedway through the 1920s. It was his vision at the time to bring the Speedway back to its origins and roots as a "proving ground" for the passenger car industry. Upon announcing the rule changes, he was quoted as saying, "Even a Model T can win." The rule changes were in fact being laid out as early as 1928, and were approved by the AAA Contest Board in early January 1929.

== Race schedule ==
Race schedule – May 1930
Sun	Mon	Tue	Wed	Thu	Fri	Sat
				1	2	3
4	5	6	7	8	9	10
11	12	13	14	15	16	17
18	19	20	21	22	23	24; Time Trials
25; Time Trials	26; Time Trials	27; Time Trials	28; Time Trials	29	30; Indy 500	31

Color	Notes
Green	Track Available for Practice
Dark Blue	Time trials
Silver	Race day
Blank	No track activity

== Practice ==
The deadline for entries to be submitted was midnight on May 1. The track was made available for practice a couple days later, with the first car taking to the track on or around Tuesday May 6. Most cars did not arrive at the Speedway until the second full week, with activity picking up mid-month.

By Monday May 19, a total of ten cars had taken to the track, with Louis Schneider (105 mph) posting the fastest lap thus far. On Tuesday May 20, the focus of attention was on the 201-c.i.d, 16-cylinder, Sampson Special of Louis Meyer. The car was now completed and wheeled out of its garage at the Steinhart Brake Services building. It was cranked up for the first time, and ready to deliver to the Speedway. Back at the track, Shorty Cantlon turned a lap of 109 mph.

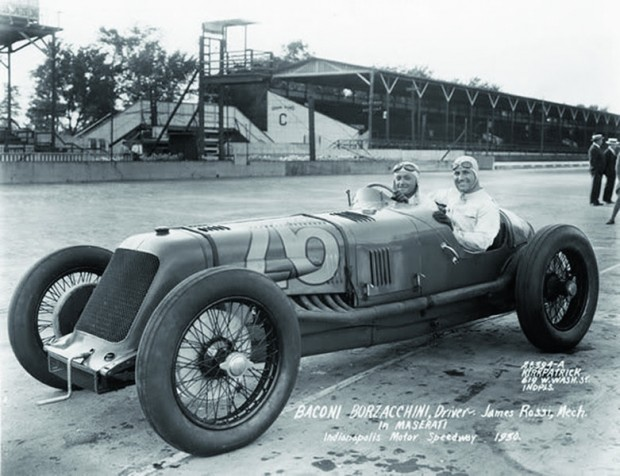
Maserati Tipo V4 driven by Baconin Borzacchini

On Wednesday May 21, Louis Meyer took to the track for the first time, blistering the bricks with a lap of 110.56 mph in the 16-cylinder machine. Meyer immediately established himself as a favorite for the front row. Meanwhile, Harry Hartz, who had not yet taken any laps in his front wheel drive Miller Special, was still expected to qualify come Saturday.

On Thursday May 22, Ralph Hepburn (112.20 mph) and Billy Arnold (111.83 mph) took laps in Harry Hartz's Miller Special. They were the two fastest laps thus far for the month. Speculation was growing that Hartz was preparing to hand the car over to either Hepburn or Arnold, but no official arrangement had been announced. As late as Friday night, Hartz was still insisting to the press that he was intending to race the car himself.

== Time trials ==
Qualifications was scheduled for five days, spanning from Saturday May 24 through Wednesday May 28. Four-lap qualifying runs were utilized, and cars were allowed up to three attempts. The minimum speed required was 85 mph. Time trials would end each day at sundown.

=== Saturday May 24 ===
The first day of time trials was held Saturday May 24, scheduled for 11 a.m. to 7:01 p.m. L. L. Corum was the first car to qualify. Car owner Harry Hartz took the #4 Miller Special out for a shake-down qualifying attempt. After one official lap of 110.429 mph, he parked the car and handed it over to Billy Arnold. Arnold proceeded to win the pole position with a four-lap run of 113.268 mph.

One day after smacking the wall, Ernie Triplett qualified sixth. After practicing on Friday at over 111 mph, and being a favorite for the pole position, Louis Meyer fell short of expectations. Meyer qualified second, owing to an ill-conceived gear ratio change the team decided to make on Saturday morning.

No major incidents were reported.

Pos	No.	Name	Lap 1 (mph)	Lap 2 (mph)	Lap 3 (mph)	Lap 4 (mph)	Average Speed (mph)
1	4	(United States) Billy Arnold	113.208	113.364	113.279	113.222	113.268
2	1	(United States) Louis Meyer W	111.552	111.843	111.552	110.227	111.290
3	16	(United States) Shorty Cantlon R	110.281	110.146	110.200	108.630	109.810
4	23	(United States) Louis Schneider	104.883	106.282	106.534	106.749	106.107
5	18	(United States) Chet Gardner R	106.597	105.485	105.746	105.423	105.811
6	17	(United States) Ernie Triplett	105.646	105.646	105.907	105.275	105.618
7	22	(United States) Russ Snowberger	104.191	104.275	104.749	105.018	104.577
8	15	(United States) Phil Shafer	101.237	102.576	102.904	102.412	102.279
9	25	(United States) Leslie Allen R	101.569	102.064	101.925	102.122	101.919
10	36	(United States) Cy Marshall R	100.334	100.976	100.874	101.203	100.846
11	33	(United States) Frank Farmer	100.111	100.402	100.581	101.374	100.615
12	14	(United States) Lou Moore	100.301	99.911	98.879	99.867	99.867
13	35	(Canada) J. C. McDonald R	98.912	98.803	99.032	99.064	98.953
14	29	(United States) Joe Caccia R	96.567	97.603	97.954	98.318	97.606
15	41	(United States) Chet Miller R	96.639	97.014	97.762	98.039	97.360
16	38	(United States) Claude Berton R	93.760	96.277	94.957	95.390	95.087
17	2	(United States) L. L. Corum W	94.468	94.379	93.730	93.946	94.130
18	39	(United States) Johnny Seymour	92.898	93.303	93.565	93.740	93.376
19	32	(United States) Charles Moran R	88.757	89.982	89.144	91.084	89.733
	4	(United States) Harry Hartz	110.429				Incomplete

- Source: The Indianapolis News

=== Sunday May 25 ===
Only two cars completed qualifying runs on Sunday May 25. Peter DePaolo was forced to change engines after crankshaft damage suffered on Saturday. Tony Gulotta put in the 12th-fastest speed thus far in the field, but as a second day qualifier, lined up in 20th starting position.

Rookie owner/driver Julius C. Slade quit his run after only two laps, then eventually would hand the car over to Roland Free. Rick Decker also pulled in after only two laps.

Pos	No.	Name	Lap 1 (mph)	Lap 2 (mph)	Lap 3 (mph)	Lap 4 (mph)	Average Speed (mph)
20	9	(United States) Tony Gulotta	100.022	100.626	99.823	99.668	100.033
21	5	(United States) Peter DePaolo W	99.712	99.491	100.615	100.011	99.956
	31	(United States) Rick Decker	96.051	94.548			Incomplete
	28	(United States) Julius C. Slade R	84.778	85.553			Incomplete

- Source: The Indianapolis News

=== Monday May 26 ===
Three cars completed qualifying runs on Monday May 26, filling the field to 24 cars. Bill Cummings led the speed chart for the day, with a run of 106.173 mph, the fourth-fastest car in the field. Cummings car arrived late in the day, and he completed his run after 6 p.m., shortly before the track closed for the day. Cummings day was not without incident, as he nearly involved in an accident along with Peter DePaolo as they drove the car to the Speedway grounds.

Four other drivers took to the track, but failed to complete their runs. Bill Denver quit after two laps. Rick Decker, making his second attempt, blew an engine after completing only one lap. Likewise, Julius C. Slade, also making his second attempt in two days, threw a rod on his final lap. Babe Stapp took to the track just before sundown, but pulled off the track apparently before starting the attempt.

Pos	No.	Name	Lap 1 (mph)	Lap 2 (mph)	Lap 3 (mph)	Lap 4 (mph)	Average Speed (mph)
22	6	(United States) Bill Cummings R	105.820	106.496	105.610	105.770	106.173
23	10	(United States) Mel Kenealy R	102.916	103.448	103.448	103.496	103.327
24	7	(United States) Jimmy Gleason	93.613	93.691	93.848	93.682	93.709
	44	(United States) Bill Denver R	91.501	91.380			Incomplete
	31	(United States) Rick Decker	92.507	engine			Incomplete
	28	(United States) Julius C. Slade R	87.951	88.037	88.054	engine	Incomplete
	8	(United States) Babe Stapp					Incomplete

- Source: The Indianapolis News

=== Tuesday May 27 ===
Six cars made qualifying attempts on Tuesday May 27, with all six running to completion. Wilbur Shaw led the speed chart for the day, with a four-lap average of 106.132 mph. There were no major incidents reported.

A day after practicing over 100 mph, Joe Huff did not disappoint, putting in the second-fastest speed of the afternoon. Rick Decker, who threw a rod and blew the engine in his #31 Decker Special on Monday, spent the day working a new engine. Decker made a deal with Fred Clemmons, owner of the #48 Hoosier Pete entry. Clemmons was unable to secure a chassis for his 4-cylinder Hoosier Pete engine, so he allowed Decker to install it in his car. The team expected to be out on the track for Wednesday.

Juan Gaudino (#52) and Fred Fansin (#53) officially scratched their entries, after they failed to arrive. At the end of the day, the field was filled to 30 cars. About twelve hopefuls remained, looking to qualify on Wednesday.

Pos	No.	Name	Lap 1 (mph)	Lap 2 (mph)	Lap 3 (mph)	Lap 4 (mph)	Average Speed (mph)
25	3	(United States) Wilbur Shaw	103.986	107.565	107.862	105.214	106.132
26	34	(United States) Joe Huff R	100.852	101.203	100.212	102.471	101.178
27	19	(United States) Speed Gardner	94.547	96.288	96.123	95.299	95.585
28	26	(Italy) Baconin Borzacchini R	96.494	96.411	94.747	93.274	95.213
29	45	(United States) Marion Trexler R	92.431	92.764	93.139	93.584	92.978
30	42	(Italy) Letterio Cucinotta R	90.827	91.445	92.156	91.921	91.584

- Source: The Indianapolis News

=== Wednesday May 28 ===
The final day of qualifications was held on Wednesday May 28, with time trials officially ending at sundown (7:04 p.m.) A total of eight cars managed to qualify for the race bringing the field to 38 cars. With an entry list featuring as many as 46-47 possible qualifiers, a total of four failed to qualify, and three cars never arrived. No cars were bumped or "crowded out."

Deacon Litz was the fastest qualifier for the day, with a run of 105.755 mph. After two failed attempts, Rick Decker finally made the field, after he finished installation of the Hoosier Pete engine. Fred Roberts and Rollin May failed to complete their attempts. Roberts threw a rod, and May was too slow to meet the 80 mph minimum speed. Doc MacKenzie never made it out to the track, and Sam Greco threw a rod with only thirty minutes left in the day.

Pos	No.	Name	Lap 1 (mph)	Lap 2 (mph)	Lap 3 (mph)	Lap 4 (mph)	Average Speed (mph)
31	12	(United States) Deacon Litz	104.676	106.070	106.132	106.157	105.755
32	8	(United States) Babe Stapp	104.834	105.895	104.118	104.969	104.950
33	24	(United States) Dave Evans	97.171	97.434	98.993	96.681	97.342
34	21	(United States) Zeke Meyer R	94.997	95.470	94.777	96.195	95.357
35	48	(United States) Rick Decker	92.147	92.053	92.147	92.831	92.293
36	44	(United States) Bill Denver R	90.680	91.185	90.126	90.616	90.650
37	28	(United States) Roland Free R	89.419	89.552	89.686	89.901	89.639
38	46	(United States) Harry Butcher R	86.605	86.948	87.133	87.328	87.003
	37	(United States) Fred Roberts R	80.928				Incomplete
	51	(United States) Rollin May R	77.640				Incomplete

- Source: The Indianapolis News

== Starting grid ==
Row	Inside	Middle	Outside
1	(United States) Billy Arnold	(United States) Louis Meyer W	(United States) Shorty Cantlon R
2	(United States) Louis Schneider	(United States) Chet Gardner R	(United States) Ernie Triplett
3	(United States) Russ Snowberger	(United States) Phil Shafer	(United States) Leslie Allen R
4	(United States) Cy Marshall R	(United States) Frank Farmer	(United States) Lou Moore
5	(Canada) J. C. McDonald R	(United States) Joe Caccia R	(United States) Chet Miller R
6	(United States) Claude Berton R	(United States) L. L. Corum W	(United States) Johnny Seymour
7	(United States) Charles Moran R	(United States) Tony Gulotta	(United States) Peter DePaolo W
8	(United States) Bill Cummings R	(United States) Mel Kenealy R	(United States) Jimmy Gleason
9	(United States) Wilbur Shaw	(United States) Joe Huff R	(United States) Speed Gardner
10	(Italy) Baconin Borzacchini R	(United States) Marion Trexler R	(Italy) Letterio Cucinotta R
11	(United States) Deacon Litz	(United States) Babe Stapp	(United States) Dave Evans
12	(United States) Zeke Meyer R	(United States) Bill Denver R	(United States) Rick Decker
13	(United States) Roland Free R	(United States) Harry Butcher R	

=== Alternates ===
- First alternate: none

=== Failed to qualify ===
- Rollin May (#51) – Incomplete qualifying attempt (Too slow)
- James Klemos/Fred Roberts (#37) – Incomplete qualifying attempt (Engine failure)
- Sam Greco (#49) – Incomplete qualifying attempt (Engine failure)
- Rick Decker (#31) – Engine failure
- Doc MacKenzie (#43) – Did not attempt to qualify
- Fred Fansin (#53) – Withdrawn/Car did not arrive
- Juan Gaudino (#52) – Withdrawn/Car did not arrive
- Duesenberg (#47) – Withdrawn/Car did not arrive

== Race recap ==
=== First half ===
Louis Meyer in his 16-cylinder Miller grabbed the lead at the start, out-dueling polesitter Billy Arnold on the first lap. Meyer led laps 1 and 2, then Arnold took the lead on lap 3. Arnold would not relinquish the lead the rest of the afternoon.

On the grid, Rick Decker's engine failed to crank, and he did not start the race. When the crew finally got his car running, it lasted only 8 laps. Chet Gardner was out on the first lap after he spun and brushed the wall on the north end, damaging his left front wheel. Gardner became the first driver in Indy history to drop out of the race without completing a single lap.

A huge crash broke out on the leader's 23rd lap. Fred Roberts (driving relief for Pete DePaolo) lost control and crashed in turn three. He collected the car of Deacon Litz, who suffered a broken arm. Litz's riding mechanic Lloyd Barnes suffered a cut to the head. The cars of Johnny Seymour, Babe Stapp, Lou Moore, and Marion Trexler also got caught up in the incident. Stapp's car rode up the wall, but he was not seriously injured. Jimmy Gleason's car suffered damage driving through the debris, and he drove back to the pits. He dropped out with what was discovered to be broken timing gears.

After leading early, Louis Meyer was forced to make a pit stop on lap 22 to repair a broken throttle connection. He lost over four minutes in the pits, and dropped as far down as 13th place. He returned to the track, and started charging back up the standings.

On the leader's 31st lap, Cy Marshall wrecked in turn three. The driver was pinned under the wreckage, but survived. His brother, riding mechanic Paul Marshall, was thrown from the car, and died of a fractured skull.

=== Second half ===
Billy Arnold won over second place Shorty Cantlon by a margin of over seven minutes (about 4 laps). Arnold was not challenged by any of the other competitors in the second half. During a pit stop on lap 111, Arnold did not request relief help, and managed to drive the entire 500 miles without relief.

Arnold led a total of 198 laps (laps 3–200) to set an all-time Indianapolis 500 record for most total laps led (198), and most consecutive laps led (198).

Second place Shorty Cantlon was relieved by Herman Schurch for laps 97 through 151.

Louis Meyer worked his way back into the top five by lap 140, but was unable to close the gap on Arnold. Meyer held fourth place over the final 50 laps, and finished sixteen minutes behind.

== Box score ==
Finish	Start	No	Name	Entrant	Chassis	Engine	Qual	Rank	Laps	Status
1	1	4	(United States) Billy Arnold	Harry Hartz	Summers	Miller	113.268	1	200	100.448 mph
2	3	16	(United States) Shorty Cantlon R (Herman Schurch Laps 147–200)	William S. White	Stevens	Miller	109.810	3	200	+7:17.46
3	4	23	(United States) Louis Schneider	Louis F. Schneider	Stevens	Miller	106.107	6	200	+11:25.49
4	2	1	(United States) Louis Meyer W	Alden Sampson II	Stevens	Miller	111.290	2	200	+16:18.35
5	22	6	(United States) Bill Cummings R (Freddie Winnai Laps 113–149)	Peter DePaolo	Stevens	Duesenberg	106.173	4	200	+21:56.39
6	33	24	(United States) Dave Evans	David E. Evans	Stevens	Miller	97.342	24	200	+25:24.78
7	8	15	(United States) Phil Shafer	Phil Shafer	Coleman	Miller	102.279	13	200	+31:17.65
8	7	22	(United States) Russ Snowberger	Russell Snowberger	Snowberger	Studebaker	104.577	11	200	+37:47.24
9	9	25	(United States) Leslie Allen R (Fred Lecklider Laps 51–115) (Stubby Stubblefield Laps 116–200)	Leslie Allen	Miller	Miller	101.919	14	200	+51:11.79
10	17	2	(United States) L. L. Corum W	Milton Jones	Stutz	Stutz	94.130	29	200	+52:52.37
11	16	38	(United States) Claude Berton R	Ira Vail	Oakland	Oakland	95.087	28	196	Flagged
12	30	42	(Italy) Letterio Cucinotta R	Letterio Piccolo Cucinotta	Maserati	Maserati	91.584	34	185	Flagged
13	15	41	(United States) Chet Miller R (Paul Bost Laps 95–160)	Thomas J. Mulligan	Ford T	Fronty-Ford	97.360	23	161	Flagged
14	38	46	(United States) Harry Butcher R	Harry M. Butcher	Buick	Buick	87.003	38	127	Flagged
15	23	10	(United States) Mel Kenealy R	J. Talbot Jr.	Whippet	Miller	103.327	12	114	Valve
16	34	21	(United States) Zeke Meyer R	Zeke Meyer	Miller	Miller	95.357	26	115	Rod
17	6	17	(United States) Ernie Triplett	Allen Guiberson	Whippet	Miller	105.618	9	125	Piston
18	13	35	(Canada) J. C. McDonald R (Johnny Krieger Laps 105–112)	William H. Richards	Studebaker	Studebaker	98.953	21	112	Fuel tank leak
19	37	28	(United States) Roland Free R	Julius C. Slade	Chrysler	Chrysler	89.639	37	69	Clutch
20	20	9	(United States) Tony Gulotta	J. Talbot Jr.	Whippet	Miller	100.033	18	79	Valve
21	11	33	(United States) Frank Farmer	M. A. Yagle	Miller	Miller	100.615	17	69	Crash
22	35	44	(United States) Bill Denver R	Gabriel Nardi	Duesenberg	Duesenberg	90.650	35	41	Rod
23	26	34	(United States) Joe Huff R (Ted Chamberlain Laps 8-27) (Speed Gardner Laps 28–48)	Herman N. Gauss	Cooper	Miller	101.178	15	48	Valve
24	25	3	(United States) Wilbur Shaw	Empire State Motors	Smith	Miller	106.135	5	54	Wrist pin
25	14	29	(United States) Joe Caccia R (Rick Decker)	William Alberti	Duesenberg	Duesenberg	97.606	22	43	Crash
26	10	36	(United States) Cy Marshall R	George A. Henry	Duesenberg	Duesenberg	100.846	16	29	Crash T3
27	19	32	(United States) Charles Moran R	Du Pont Motors, Inc.	Du Pont	Du Pont	89.733	36	22	Crash T3
28	24	7	(United States) Jimmy Gleason	Thomas J. Mulligan	Miller	Miller	93.709	30	22	Timing gears
29	12	14	(United States) Lou Moore	Coleman Motors Corporation	Coleman	Miller	99.867	20	23	Crash T3
30	31	12	(United States) Deacon Litz	Henry W. Maley	Duesenberg	Duesenberg	105.755	8	22	Crash T3
31	32	8	(United States) Babe Stapp	A. S. Duesenberg	Duesenberg	Duesenberg	104.950	10	18	Crash T3
32	18	39	(United States) Johnny Seymour	Herman N. Gauss	Cooper	Miller	93.376	31	21	Crash T3
33	21	5	(United States) Peter DePaolo W (Fred Roberts Laps 8-20)	Peter DePaolo	Stevens	Duesenberg	99.956	19	20	Crash T3
34	29	45	(United States) Marion Trexler R	M. M. Lain Jr.	Auburn	Lycoming	92.978	32	19	Crash T3
35	27	19	(United States) Speed Gardner	W. H. Gardner	Miller	Miller	95.585	25	14	Main bearing
36	28	26	(Italy) Baconin Borzacchini R (Jimmy Rossi Laps 4–7)	Alfieri Maserati	Maserati	Maserati	95.213	27	7	Magneto
37	36	48	(United States) Rick Decker	Clemons Motors, Inc.	Mercedes	Clemons	92.293	33	8	Oil tank
38	5	18	(United States) Chet Gardner R	James H. Booth	Duesenberg	Duesenberg	105.811	7	1	Spun T1

Note: Relief drivers in parentheses

W Former Indianapolis 500 winner

R Indianapolis 500 Rookie

Note: Cars not finishing were awarded positions in the order in which they left the track, regardless of lap count

=== Statistics ===
Lap Leaders
Laps	Leader
1–2	Louis Meyer
3–200	Billy Arnold

Total laps led
Laps	Leader
Billy Arnold	198
Louis Meyer	2

== Race details ==
- For 1930, riding mechanics were required. It was the first time since 1922 that riding mechanics were mandatory.
- This was the first Indy 500 to utilize the green flag to signify the start of the race. Previous years had used the red flag, before the development of standard uniform traffic guidelines and protocol as defined by the MUTCD and AASHTO.
- This was the first 500 after the stock market crash of 1929, and the first to be held under the Great Depression.

== Chet Miller ==
One of the most famous nostalgic stories of Indianapolis 500 lore occurred with driver Chet Miller during the 1930 race. Just short of the mid-way point, Miller was in for a pit stop in his Fronty-Ford. The car, which was made up mostly of Model T parts, was discovered to have a broken right front spring. Race officials would not let Miller return to the track until repairs were made, so the crew began a search for suitable replacement parts.

Within a short time, the crew spotted an unattended Model T, that ostensibly belonged to a spectator, parked nearby in the infield. With the owner nowhere in sight, the crew proceeded to remove the spring they needed, and subsequently installed it on Miller's race car sitting in the pit area. After a stop of over 41 minutes, Miller was back out on the track with the borrowed spring, and drove to a 13th-place finish.

Following the race, with the vehicle's owner still not located, the crew went back to the infield and re-installed the spring on the unknown spectator's Model T. It is believed that the owner of the car was never aware of the entire situation.

== Notes ==
=== Works cited ===
- Indianapolis 500 History: Race & All-Time Stats – Official Site

=== References ===
Grand Prix Race
Previous race: 1929 French Grand Prix	1930 Grand Prix season Grandes Épreuves	Next race: 1930 Belgian Grand Prix
Previous race: 1929 Indianapolis 500	Indianapolis 500	Next race: 1931 Indianapolis 500
