= Billy Arnold (racing driver) =

American racing driver (1905–1976)

- Born: Richard William Arnold; December 16, 1905 Chicago, Illinois, U.S.
- Died: November 10, 1976 (aged 70) Oklahoma City, Oklahoma, U.S.

Championship titles
- AAA Championship Car (1930); Major victories Indianapolis 500 (1930)

Champ Car career
- 17 races run over 5 years
- Best finish: 1st (1930)
- First race: 1928 Indianapolis 500 (Indianapolis)
- Last race: 1932 Indianapolis 500 (Indianapolis)
- First win: 1930 Indianapolis 500 (Indianapolis)
- Last win: 1930 Altoona 200 #2 (Altoona)
Wins	Podiums	Poles
3	4	4

William Henry Arnold (born Richard William Arnold, December 16, 1905 – November 10, 1976) was an American racing driver. He won the 1930 Indianapolis 500.

== Early life ==
Richard William Arnold was born in Chicago on December 16, 1905. At the age of ten, he became the sole support for his family. He earned his B.S. degree in mechanical engineering from the University of Illinois at Urbana–Champaign and after his racing days were over, pursued a Ph.D. from the MIAT College of Technology. At some point in his life he changed his name to William Henry Arnold.

== Racing career ==
Arnold won the 1930 Indianapolis 500 after leading all but first two laps of the race, the most ever by a winner of the race and he won by a margin of 7 minutes and 17 seconds. He was 24 years old at the time. In 1931, he led 155 laps but crashed on lap 162 while holding a five-lap lead, sustaining serious injuries along with his riding mechanic Spider Matlock. A tire came off the car, bounced over the stands and killed 11-year-old Wilbur Brink, who was struck near his parents' concession stand outside the track. In 1932 Arnold led 57 laps before crashing on lap 59. He sustained a broken shoulder and riding mechanic Matlock sustained a broken pelvis. At the urging of his wife, Arnold retired from racing.

== Military service ==
During World War II, Arnold served with Gen. Dwight D. Eisenhower as Chief of Maintenance for the U.S. 8th Air Force and left the service in 1945 as a LtCol.

== Post-war career ==
Following the war, Arnold worked at Fretwell's DeSoto then entered the construction business, building upscale houses and one of the first shopping centers in Oklahoma. Between 1950 and 1958, he developed water skis and was among the pioneers of the sport. His AquaKing water skis became the official water ski of Cypress Gardens in Florida.

== Death and personal life ==
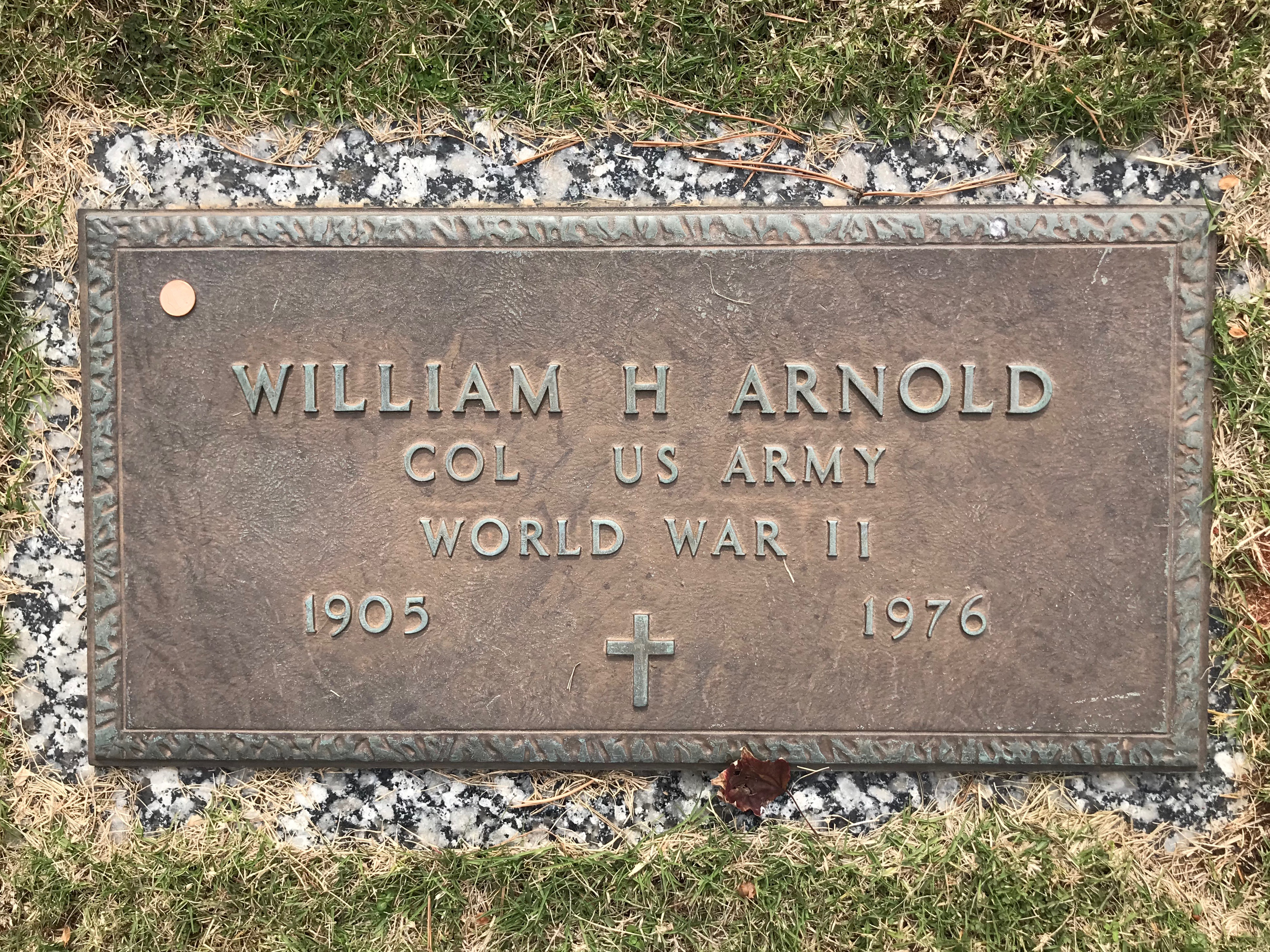
Gravestone in Oklahoma City

Arnold died November 10, 1976, in Oklahoma City, of a cerebral hemorrhage, aged 70. He is buried at Resurrection Memorial Cemetery in Oklahoma City.

At the time of his death, Arnold was married to LaFrance Arnold, his second wife. Prior to this, he was married to Dorothy Canfield of Detroit.

== Awards and honors ==
Arnold has been inducted into the following halls of fame:

- Auto Racing Hall of Fame (1977)

In 1944, Arnold received the Legion of Merit in recognition of his services to the Eighth Air Force.

== Motorsports career results ==
=== Indianapolis 500 results ===
Year	Car	Start	Qual	Rank	Finish	Laps	Led	Retired
1928	43	20	111.926	12	7	200	0	Running
1929	9	7	114.752	8	8	200	0	Running
1930	4	1	113.268	1	1	200	198	Running
1931	1	18	116.080	1	19	162	155	Crash T4
1932	5	2	116.290	2	31	59	57	Crash T3
Totals						821	410	

Starts	5
Poles	1
Front Row	2
Wins	1
Top 5	1
Top 10	3
Retired	2

Preceded by Ray Keech	Indianapolis 500 Winner; 1930	Succeeded by Louis Schneider
