= Rick Decker (racing driver) =

American racing driver (1903–1966)

- Born: Rickliffe Murel Decker; May 23, 1903 Staten Island, New York, U.S.
- Died: March 1, 1966 (aged 62) Somerville, New Jersey, U.S.

Champ Car career
- 5 races run over 7 years
- First race: 1929 Indianapolis 500 (Indianapolis)
- Last race: 1936 Vanderbilt Cup (Westbury)
Wins	Podiums	Poles
0	0	0

Rickliffe Murel Decker (May 3, 1903 – March 1, 1966) was an American racing driver.

== Biography ==
Decker was born in Staten Island, New York in 1903 to William Lloyd Decker and Anjeanette (née Barnes). He participated in the Indianapolis 500 from 1929 to 1934. He died in New Jersey in 1966.

== Motorsports career results ==
=== Indianapolis 500 results ===
Year	Car	Start	Qual	Rank	Finish	Laps	Led	Retired
1929	29	30	105.288	30	23	61	0	Supercharger
1930	48	36	92.293	33	37	8	0	Oil tank
1933	61	38	108.280	38	41	13	0	Manifold
1934	45	27	110.895	26	27	17	0	Clutch
Totals						99	0	

Starts	4
Poles	0
Front Row	0
Wins	0
Top 5	0
Top 10	0
Retired	4
