= Shorty Cantlon =

American racing driver (1903–1947)

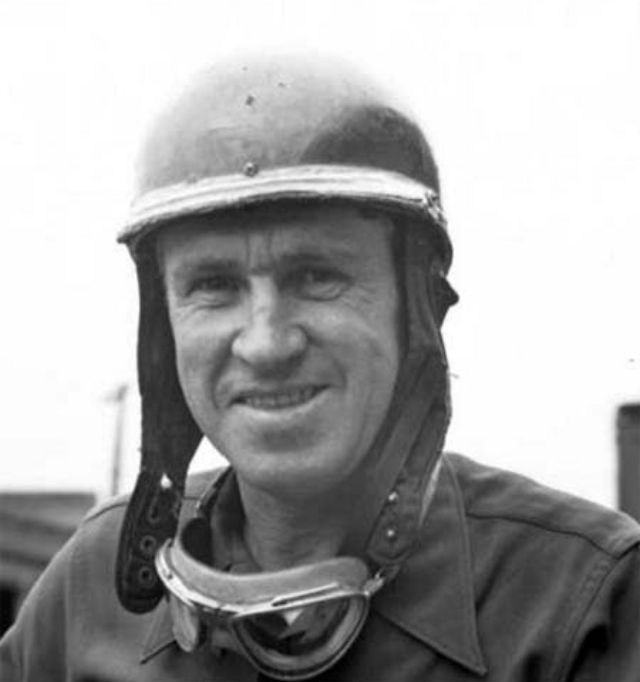
- Born: William Andrew Cantlon; October 18, 1903 Cary, Illinois, U.S.
- Died: May 30, 1947 (aged 43) Speedway, Indiana, U.S.

Champ Car career
- 38 races run over 16 years
- Best finish: 2nd (1930)
- First race: 1929 Detroit 100 (Detroit)
- Last race: 1947 Indianapolis 500 (Indianapolis)
- First win: 1930 Akron 100 (Akron)
- Last win: 1934 Syracuse 100 (Syracuse)
Wins	Podiums	Poles
4	9	5

William Andrew "Shorty" Cantlon (October 18, 1903 – May 30, 1947) was an American racing driver.

== Death ==
Cantlon was killed on May 30, 1947, while racing in the 1947 Indianapolis 500. His accident was on lap 40, after swerving into the outside retaining wall to avoid the spinning car of Bill Holland, who recovered from the spin to finish second. He was buried in Detroit, Michigan at Mt. Olivet Cemetery.

== Motorsports career results ==
=== Indianapolis 500 results ===
Year	Car	Start	Qual	Rank	Finish	Laps	Led	Retired
1930	16	3	109.810	3	2	200	0	Running
1931	2	26	110.372	11	27	88	0	Rod
1933	25	13	113.384	16	34	50	0	Rod
1934	15	15	117.875	2	20	76	0	Crankshaft
1935	9	19	118.205	4	6	200	0	Running
1936	7	10	116.912	6	14	194	0	Out of gas
1937	34	25	118.555	18	16	182	0	Flagged
1938	47	20	120.906	14	33	13	0	Supercharger
1939	47	7	125.567	10	32	15	0	Main bearing
1946	64	20	122.432	14	28	28	0	Clutch
1947	24	5	121.462	14	23	40	0	Fatal Crash T1
Totals						1086	0	

Starts	11
Poles	0
Front Row	1
Wins	0
Top 5	1
Top 10	2
Retired	8
