= Riding mechanic =

Mechanic that rode along with a race car during races

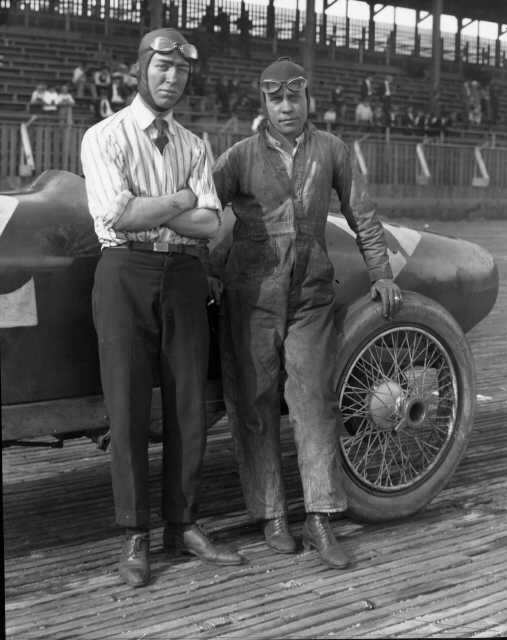
1922 Indianapolis 500 winner Jimmy Murphy (left) is shown here with his riding "mechanician" Eddie Olson, posing next to their Duesenberg at Tacoma Speedway.

A riding mechanic was a mechanic that rode along with a race car during races, and who was tasked with maintaining, monitoring, and repairing the car during the race. The various duties included manually pumping oil and fuel, checking tire wear, observing gauges, and even massaging the driver's hands. They also communicated with the pits and spotted from inside the car. If the car ran out of fuel, or otherwise broke down, the riding mechanic was usually responsible for running back to the pits to fetch fuel or the necessary spare parts.

Riding mechanics were also referred to by the term mechanician. The position is largely associated with the early years of championship car racing and the Indianapolis 500; however, they were also utilized in grand prix racing for a while.

== History ==
=== Indianapolis 500 ===
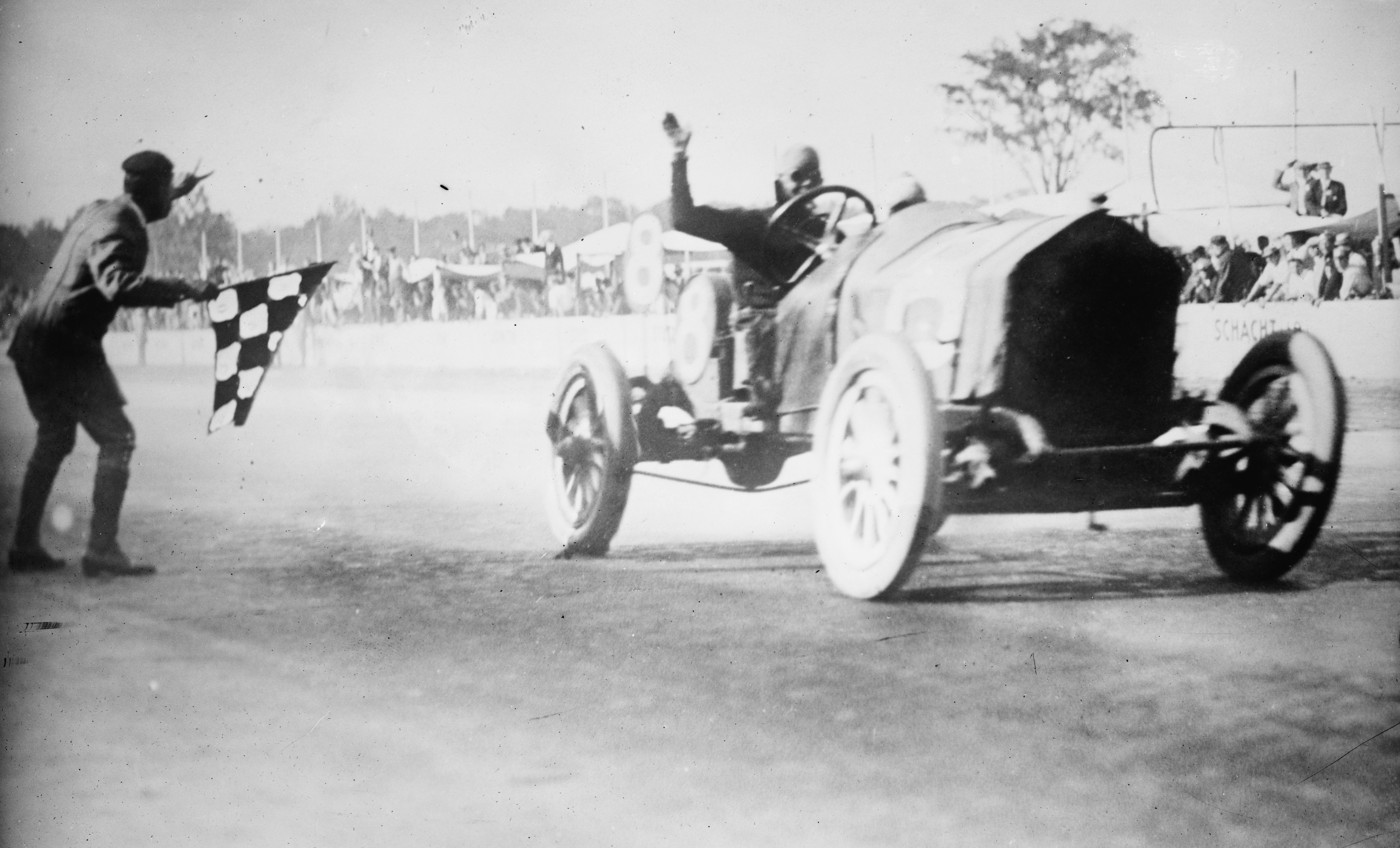
Joe Dawson (left) and riding mechanic Harry Martin (visible on the right of the cockpit) winning the 1912 Indianapolis 500

Riding mechanics were used by most cars in the Indianapolis 500 from 1911 to 1922, and again from 1930 to 1937. In the first 500, driver Ray Harroun notably drove solo, the only car in the field without a riding mechanic. He famously affixed a rear-view mirror to the car, in order to see cars behind him (a task normally assigned to the mechanic). Harroun is famously regarded as the first driver to utilize a rear view mirror on a race car, however, he said he got the idea from seeing a mirror used for the same purpose on a horse-drawn vehicle in 1904.

Starting in 1912, the AAA Contest Board declared that riding mechanics were mandatory for all races of 100 miles or longer (which included Indianapolis). In 1923 riding mechanics were made optional, and only one team utilized them. They were made mandatory once again and brought back from 1930 to 1937. From 1938 on, they were again declared optional, but no teams in the starting field used one ever again. In the years immediately following World War II, nearly all two-man cars had been parked, or converted to single-seaters. Riding mechanics were not formally written out of the rule book until 1964.

The mechanics sat in a passenger seat, typically to the outside of the driver, a precarious position close to the retaining wall. Some cars, however, did have the positions reversed, with the riding mechanic on the inside. Due to the close quarters, many were of short stature and small build.

Some notable riding mechanics are Harry Holcomb, Robert Bandini, and Monk Jordan. The last living Indy 500 riding mechanic, Joseph F. Kennelly, died in September 2011. A small handful of riding mechanics were also drivers in their own right. The 1922 Indianapolis 500 winner Jimmy Murphy started his racing career as a riding mechanic. 1935 winner Kelly Petillo served as mechanician, as did 1925 winner Pete DePaolo who was actually the riding mechanic for his maternal Uncle Ralph DePalma when he won the 500 in 1919. While accurate records are incomplete and spotty overall, the identification of riding mechanics from the history of the Indianapolis 500 is mostly complete and fairly reliable.

=== Grand Prix ===
Riding mechanics were also required in the classic era of grand prix. Riding mechanics were banned in Europe after the death of Tom Barrett in 1924.

== Indianapolis 500 winning riding mechanics ==
Driver Ralph DePalma and riding mechanic Rupert Jeffkins, pushing the Mercedes down the main straightaway at the conclusion of the 1912 500-Mile Race

Year	Winning Driver	Winning Riding Mechanic
1911	Riding mechanic not utilized	
1912	Joe Dawson	Harry Martin
1913	Jules Goux	Emil Begin
1914	René Thomas	Robert Laly
1915	Ralph DePalma	Louis Fontaine
1916	Dario Resta	Bob Dahnke
1917	No race held due to World War I	
1918	No race held due to World War I	
1919	Howdy Wilcox	Leo Banks
1920	Gaston Chevrolet	John Bresnahan
1921	Tommy Milton	Harry Franck
1922	Jimmy Murphy	Ernie Olson
1923	Riding mechanic not utilized	
1924	Riding mechanic not utilized	
1925	Riding mechanic not utilized	
1926	Riding mechanic not utilized	
1927	Riding mechanic not utilized	
1928	Riding mechanic not utilized	
1929	Riding mechanic not utilized	
1930	Billy Arnold	Spider Matlock
1931	Louis Schneider	Jigger Johnson
1932	Fred Frame	Jerry Houck
1933	Louis Meyer	Lawson Harris
1934	Bill Cummings	Earl Unversaw
1935	Kelly Petillo	Jimmy Dunham
1936	Louis Meyer	Lawson Harris
1937	Wilbur Shaw	Jigger Johnson
1938	Riding mechanic not utilized	

=== Notes ===
- In 1911, riding mechanics were optional, and race winner Ray Harroun did not utilize one.
- In 1919 Leo Banks replaced the originally listed Maurice Becker. Becker had been disallowed by his family from participating in the race.
- From 1923 to 1929, riding mechanics were optional, and in each of those years, the winning entry did not utilize one.
- Starting in 1938, riding mechanics were once again optional, and were not utilized by any of the competitors.

== Fatalities ==
- List of IndyCar fatalities, including racing mechanics
- List of fatalities at the Indianapolis Motor Speedway, including racing mechanics

== See also ==
- Co-driver
