= Indianapolis Motor Speedway race results =

Advertisement for the Indianapolis Motor Speedway's 1916 Harvest Auto Racing Classic event

Race results from the automobile and motorcycle races contested at the Indianapolis Motor Speedway in Speedway, Indiana. Races have been held on seven different track configurations:

- Oval (1909–present): 2.500 miles; 4 turns; counter-clockwise
- Automobile road course (2000–2007): 2.605 miles; 13 turns; clockwise
- Motorcycle road course (2008–2013): 2.621 miles; 16 turns; counter-clockwise
- Automobile road course (2009–2013): 2.534 miles; 13 turns; clockwise
- Automobile road course INDYCAR GP version (2014–present): 2.439 miles; 14 turns; clockwise
- Automobile road course SCCA Runoffs version (2014–present): 2.589 miles; 15 turns; clockwise
- Motorcycle road course (2014–present): 2.591 miles; 16 turns; counter-clockwise
- Dirt track (2018–present): 0.200 miles; 4 turns; counter-clockwise

== Automobile races – oval ==
=== Prest-O-Lite Trophy, Wheeler-Schebler Trophy, and other early automobile races (1909–1910) ===
On four race weekends in 1909 and 1910, a total of 82 automobile races were held, with lengths varying between 5 and 250 miles. Of these, 17 were of distance of 20 miles or more. None of the short races served as a qualifying race, or "heat" race, for the longer events. Each race stood on its own, and awarded its own trophy. All 82 races were sanctioned by the American Automobile Association (AAA). The 1909 races took place on the original crushed stone and tar surface. As the weekend progressed, the track surface began breaking up badly, and the final race of the weekend, scheduled for a 300-mile length, was shortened to 235 miles. The next scheduled weekend of auto races, planned for early October, was canceled so the track could be repaved in brick during the fall of 1909. Over two days in December, several automobile and motorcycle racers conducted speed exhibitions, in extremely cold temperatures. No races had been planned for that event. The next races were run over three holiday weekends in 1910.

==== August 1909 meet ====
| Date | Race name | Winning driver | Car | Race distance | | Class |
| Date | Race name | Winning driver | Car | Miles | Laps | Class |
|---|---|---|---|---|---|---|
| Aug 19 | Unnamed (1st race held this date) | (United States) Louis Schwitzer | Stoddard-Dayton | 5 | 2 | Stock 161–230 cu in |
| Aug 19 | Unnamed (2nd race held this date) | (United States) Louis Chevrolet | Buick | 10 | 4 | Stock 231–300 cu in |
| Aug 19 | Unnamed (3rd race held this date) | (Canada) William Bourque | Knox | 5 | 2 | Stock 301–450 cu in |
| Aug 19 | Unnamed (4th race held this date) | (United States) Ray Harroun | Marmon | 10 | 4 | Handicap |
| Aug 19 | Prest-O-Lite Trophy | (United States) Bob Burman | Buick | 250 | 100 | Stock 301–450 cu in |
| Aug 20 | Unnamed (1st race held this date) | (United States) Lewis Strang | Buick | 5 | 2 | Stock 231–300 cu in |
| Aug 20 | Unnamed (2nd race held this date) | (United States) Charlie Merz | National | 10 | 4 | Stock 301–450 cu in |
| Aug 20 | Unnamed (3rd race held this date) | (United States) Johnny Aitken | National | 10 | 4 | Stock > 601 cu in |
| Aug 20 | Unnamed (4th race held this date) | (United States) Carl Wright | Stoddard-Dayton | 50 | 20 | 161–230 cu in |
| Aug 20 | Ford Trophy | (United States) Len Zengel | Chadwick | 10 | 4 | Free for all |
| Aug 20 | Unnamed (6th race held this date) | (United States) Johnny Aitken | National | 5 | 2 | Handicap |
| Aug 20 | G & J Trophy | (United States) Lewis Strang | Buick | 100 | 40 | Stock 231–300 cu in |
| Aug 21 | Unnamed (1st race held this date) | (United States) Tom Kincade | National | 15 | 6 | Handicap |
| Aug 21 | Unnamed (2nd race held this date) | (United States) Eddie Hearne | Fiat | 10 | 4 | Amateur |
| Aug 21 | Remy Grand Brassard | (United States) Barney Oldfield | Benz | 25 | 10 | Free for all |
| Aug 21 | Wheeler-Schebler Trophy | (United States) Leigh Lynch | Jackson | 235 | 94 | Stock > 601 cu in |

==== May 1910 meet ====
| Date | Race name | Winning driver | Car | Race distance | | Class |
| Date | Race name | Winning driver | Car | Miles | Laps | Class |
|---|---|---|---|---|---|---|
| May 27 | Unnamed (1st race held this date) | (United States) Louis Chevrolet | Buick | 5 | 2 | Stock 161–230 cu in |
| May 27 | Unnamed (2nd race held this date) | (United States) Ray Harroun | Marmon | 10 | 4 | Stock 231–300 cu in |
| May 27 | Unnamed (3rd race held this date) | (United States) Tom Kincade | National | 5 | 2 | Stock 301–450 cu in |
| May 27 | Unnamed (4th race held this date) | (United States) Johnny Aitken | National | 10 | 4 | Stock 451–600 cu in |
| May 27 | Unnamed (5th race held this date) | (United States) Arthur Greiner | National | 5 | 2 | Handicap |
| May 27 | Unnamed (6th race held this date) | (United States) Arthur Greiner | National | 5 | 2 | Amateur |
| May 27 | Speedway Helmet | (United States) Bob Burman | Buick | 5 | 2 | Free for all |
| May 27 | Prest-O-Lite Trophy | (United States) Tom Kincade | National | 100 | 40 | Stock 301–450 cu in |
| May 28 | Unnamed (1st race held this date) | (United States) Johnny Aitken | National | 10 | 4 | Stock 301–450 cu in |
| May 28 | Unnamed (2nd race held this date) | (United States) Barney Oldfield | Knox | 5 | 2 | Stock 451–600 cu in |
| May 28 | Unnamed (3rd race held this date) | (United States) Howdy Wilcox | National | 10 | 4 | Handicap |
| May 28 | Wheeler-Schebler Trophy | (United States) Ray Harroun | Marmon | 200 | 80 | Stock > 601 cu in |
| May 30 | Unnamed (1st race held this date) | (United States) Caleb Bragg | Fiat | 10 | 4 | Free for all |
| May 30 | Unnamed (2nd race held this date) | (United States) Louis Chevrolet | Buick | 10 | 4 | Stock 161–230 cu in |
| May 30 | Unnamed (3rd race held this date) | (United States) Joe Dawson | Marmon | 5 | 2 | Stock 231–300 cu in |
| May 30 | Unnamed (4th race held this date) | (United States) Caleb Bragg | Fiat | 5 | 2 | Free for all |
| May 30 | Unnamed (5th race held this date) | (United States) Ray Harroun | Marmon | 10 | 4 | Stock 231–300 cu in |
| May 30 | Unnamed (6th race held this date) | (United States) Barney Oldfield | Knox | 5 | 2 | Stock 451–600 cu in |
| May 30 | Unnamed (7th race held this date) | (United States) Johnny Aitken | National | 5 | 2 | Stock 301–450 cu in |
| May 30 | Unnamed (8th race held this date) | (United States) Jack Reed | Stoddard-Dayton | 5 | 2 | Handicap |
| May 30 | Unnamed (9th race held this date) | (United States) Barney Oldfield | Knox | 10 | 4 | Stock 451–600 cu in |
| May 30 | Unnamed (10th race held this date) | (United States) Johnny Aitken | National | 10 | 4 | Stock 301–450 cu in |
| May 30 | Unnamed (11th race held this date) | (United States) Caleb Bragg | Fiat | 10 | 4 | Free for all |
| May 30 | Remy Grand Brassard | (United States) Ray Harroun | Marmon | 50 | 20 | Stock 231–300 cu in |

==== July 1910 meet ====
| Date | Race name | Winning driver | Car | Race distance | | Class |
| Date | Race name | Winning driver | Car | Miles | Laps | Class |
|---|---|---|---|---|---|---|
| July 1 | Unnamed (1st race held this date) | (United States) Mortimer Roberts | Herreshoff | 5 | 2 | Stock < 161 cu in |
| July 1 | Unnamed (2nd race held this date) | (United States) Louis Chevrolet | Buick | 5 | 2 | Stock 161–230 cu in |
| July 1 | Unnamed (3rd race held this date) | (United States) Joe Dawson ^{[a]} | Marmon | 10 | 4 | Stock 231–300 cu in |
| July 1 | Unnamed (4th race held this date) | (United States) Johnny Aitken ^{[b]} | National | 15 | 6 | Stock 301–450 cu in |
| July 1 | Unnamed (5th race held this date) | (United States) Harry Grant | ALCO | 10 | 4 | Stock 451–600 cu in |
| July 1 | Unnamed (6th race held this date) | (United States) N. J. Sutcliffe | Maytag | 10 | 4 | Handicap |
| July 1 | Unnamed (7th race held this date) | (United States) Arthur Greiner | National | 5 | 2 | Amateur |
| July 1 | Speedway Helmet | (United States) Eddie Hearne | Benz | 10 | 4 | Free for all |
| July 1 | G & J Trophy | (United States) Billy Pearce ^{[c]} | FAL | 50 | 20 | Stock 231–300 cu in |
| July 2 | Unnamed (1st race held this date) | (United States) Mortimer Roberts | Herreshoff | 10 | 4 | Stock < 161 cu in |
| July 2 | Unnamed (2nd race held this date) | (United States) Louis Chevrolet | Buick | 10 | 4 | Stock 161–230 cu in |
| July 2 | Unnamed (3rd race held this date) | (United States) Joe Dawson ^{[d]} | Marmon | 5 | 2 | Stock 231–300 cu in |
| July 2 | Unnamed (4th race held this date) | (United States) Johnny Aitken ^{[e]} | National | 10 | 4 | Stock 301–450 cu in |
| July 2 | Unnamed (5th race held this date) | (United States) Harry Grant | ALCO | 20 | 8 | Stock 451–600 cu in |
| July 2 | Unnamed (6th race held this date) | (United States) George Robertson | Simplex | 10 | 4 | Handicap |
| July 2 | Unnamed (7th race held this date) | (United States) Arthur Greiner | National | 10 | 4 | Amateur |
| July 2 | Unnamed (8th race held this date) | (United States) Johnny Aitken | National | 5 | 2 | Free for all |
| July 2 | Remy Grand Brassard | (United States) Joe Dawson ^{[a]} | Marmon | 100 | 40 | Stock 301–450 cu in |
| July 4 | Unnamed (1st race held this date) | (United States) Louis Chevrolet | Buick | 10 | 4 | Stock 161–230 cu in |
| July 4 | Unnamed (2nd race held this date) | (United States) Mortimer Roberts | Herreshoff | 5 | 2 | Stock < 161 cu in |
| July 4 | Unnamed (3rd race held this date) | (United States) Louis Heineman | FAL | 5 | 2 | Stock 231–300 cu in |
| July 4 | Cobe Trophy | (United States) Joe Dawson | Marmon | 200 | 80 | Stock > 601 cu in |
| July 4 | Unnamed (5th race held this date) | (United States) Arthur Greiner ^{[f]} | National | 5 | 2 | Amateur |
| July 4 | Unnamed (6th race held this date) | (United States) Eddie Hearne | Benz | 20 | 8 | Free for all |
| [a] | Joe Dawson was awarded this victory in late July, after the original first-place finisher (Bob Burman) was disqualified. | | | | | |
| [b] | Johnny Aitken was awarded this victory in late July, after the original first-place finisher (Bob Burman) was disqualified. | | | | | |
| [c] | Billy Pearce was awarded this victory in late July, after the original first-place finisher (Bob Burman) and second place finisher (Louis Chevrolet) were disqualified. | | | | | |
| [d] | Joe Dawson was awarded this victory in late July, after the original first-place finisher (Louis Chevrolet) and second place finisher (Bob Burman) were disqualified. | | | | | |
| [e] | Johnny Aitken was awarded this victory in late July, after the original first-place finisher (Louis Chevrolet) was disqualified. | | | | | |
| [f] | Arthur Greiner was awarded this victory in late July, after the original first-place finisher (Spencer Wishart) was disqualified. | | | | | |

==== September 1910 meet ====
| Date | Race Name | Winning Driver | Car | Race Distance | | Class |
| Date | Race Name | Winning Driver | Car | Miles | Laps | Class |
|---|---|---|---|---|---|---|
| Sep 3 | Unnamed (1st race held this date) | (United States) Louis Edmunds | Cole | 5 | 2 | Stock 161–230 cu in |
| Sep 3 | Unnamed (2nd race held this date) | (United States) Ray Harroun | Marmon | 5 | 2 | Stock 231–300 cu in |
| Sep 3 | Unnamed (3rd race held this date) | (United States) Johnny Aitken | National | 5 | 2 | Stock 301–450 cu in |
| Sep 3 | Unnamed (4th race held this date) | (United States) Howdy Wilcox | National | 5 | 2 | Stock 451–600 cu in |
| Sep 3 | Speedway Helmet | (United States) Eddie Hearne | Benz | 10 | 4 | Free for all |
| Sep 3 | Unnamed (6th race held this date) | Walter Emmons | Herreshoff | 5 | 2 | Stock < 161 cu in |
| Sep 3 | Unnamed (7th race held this date) | (United States) Eddie Hearne | Benz | 100 | 40 | Free for all |
| Sep 3 | Unnamed (8th race held this date) | (United States) Louis Edmunds | Cole | 5 | 2 | Handicap |
| Sep 3 | Remy Grand Brassard | (United States) Howdy Wilcox | National | 100 | 40 | Stock < 451 cu in |
| Sep 5 | Unnamed (1st race held this date) | Walter Emmons | Herreshoff | 5 | 2 | Stock < 161 cu in |
| Sep 5 | Unnamed (2nd race held this date) | (United States) Ralph DePalma | Fiat | 10 | 4 | Free for all |
| Sep 5 | Unnamed (3rd race held this date) | (United States) Lee Frayer | Firestone-Columbus | 5 | 2 | Stock 161–230 cu in |
| Sep 5 | Unnamed (4th race held this date) | (United States) Ray Harroun | Marmon | 5 | 2 | Stock 231–300 cu in |
| Sep 5 | Unnamed (5th race held this date) | (United States) Johnny Aitken | National | 5 | 2 | Stock 301–450 cu in |
| Sep 5 | Unnamed (6th race held this date) | (United States) Howdy Wilcox | National | 5 | 2 | Stock 451–600 cu in |
| Sep 5 | Unnamed (7th race held this date) | (United States) W.J. Barndollar | McFarlan | 5 | 2 | Handicap |
| Sep 5 | Unnamed (8th race held this date) | (United States) Eddie Hearne | Benz | 50 | 20 | Free for all |
| Sep 5 | Unnamed (9th race held this date) | (United States) Johnny Aitken | National | 200 | 80 | Stock > 601 cu in |

== Automobile races – road course ==
=== United States Grand Prix at Indianapolis (2000–2007) ===
Beginning in 2000, the United States Grand Prix at Indianapolis, a round of the Formula One World Championship, was held on a combined road course, utilizing part of the oval and a new infield segment. The first running was widely popular, and marked the return of Formula One to the United States for the first time since 1991.

During the 2005 Formula One season, a rule mandated all cars must run an entire (305 km / 190 miles) race on one set of tires, and there was a tire war between Bridgestone and Michelin during the season. That led to controversy when two crashes in practice took place with Michelin-shod cars because of tire failure, especially with the high g-loads through turns 12 and 13. On race morning, all cars utilizing Michelin tires withdrew from the race on the formation lap due to safety concerns and the rules in question at the time. The controversy tarnished the event, angered fans and media, and led to costly ticket refunds.

The event recovered, with successful races held in 2006 and 2007, but crowds never matched the year 2000 attendance. After the contract expired in 2007, an agreement could not be reached to hold the race in 2008. A future return to Indianapolis had been rumored, but was always denied. Speedway officials claimed they made profit on the first four runnings, but lost money on the last four runnings. After the announcement of a new United States Grand Prix in Austin, and management and schedule changes at the Speedway, a return of Formula One is highly unlikely.

| Year | Date | Race name | Winning driver | Car | Race distance | | Report |
| Year | Date | Race name | Winning driver | Car | Miles | Laps | Report |
|---|---|---|---|---|---|---|---|
| 2000 | September 24 | SAP United States Grand Prix | (Germany) Michael Schumacher | Ferrari | 190.2 | 73 | Report |
| 2001 | September 30 | SAP United States Grand Prix | (Finland) Mika Häkkinen | McLaren-Mercedes | 190.2 | 73 | Report |
| 2002 | September 29 | SAP United States Grand Prix | (Brazil) Rubens Barrichello | Ferrari | 190.2 | 73 | Report |
| 2003 | September 28 | Foster's HSBC United States Grand Prix | (Germany) Michael Schumacher | Ferrari | 190.2 | 73 | Report |
| 2004 | June 20 | Foster's United States Grand Prix | (Germany) Michael Schumacher | Ferrari | 190.2 | 73 | Report |
| 2005 | June 19 | Foster's United States Grand Prix | (Germany) Michael Schumacher | Ferrari | 190.2 | 73 | Report |
| 2006 | July 2 | Vodafone United States Grand Prix | (Germany) Michael Schumacher | Ferrari | 190.2 | 73 | Report |
| 2007 | June 17 | RBS United States Grand Prix | (United Kingdom) Lewis Hamilton | McLaren-Mercedes | 190.2 | 73 | Report |

=== Porsche Supercup (2000–2006) ===
The Porsche Supercup series held twin races, as support to the United States Grand Prix. On September 23, 2000, by winning the first of two races, Bernd Maylander earned the distinction of becoming the first driver to win a race of any kind on the Indianapolis Motor Speedway road course. All participating cars: Porsche.

| Year | Date | Winning driver | Race distance | |
| Year | Date | Winning driver | Miles | Laps |
|---|---|---|---|---|
| 2000 | Sep 23 | (Germany) Bernd Maylander | 41.7 | 16 |
| 2000 | Sep 24 | (Germany) Jörg Bergmeister | 41.7 | 16 |
| 2001 | Sep 29 | (Germany) Sascha Maassen | 41.7 | 16 |
| 2001 | Sep 30 | (Germany) Jörg Bergmeister | 41.7 | 16 |
| 2002 | Sep 28 | (Australia) Alex Davison | 41.7 | 16 |
| 2002 | Sep 29 | (Germany) Wolf Henzler | 41.7 | 16 |
| 2003 | Sep 27 | (Netherlands) Patrick Huisman | 41.7 | 16 |
| 2003 | Sep 28 | (Germany) Wolf Henzler | 41.7 | 16 |
| 2004 | June 19 | (Germany) Wolf Henzler | 41.7 | 16 |
| 2004 | June 20 | (Germany) Wolf Henzler | 41.7 | 16 |
| 2005 | June 18 | (Belgium) David Saelens | 41.7 | 16 |
| 2005 | June 19 | (Belgium) David Saelens | 41.7 | 16 |
| 2006 | July 1 | (United Kingdom) Richard Westbrook | 41.7 | 16 |
| 2006 | July 2 | (United Kingdom) Richard Westbrook | 41.7 | 16 |

=== Ferrari Challenge (2000–2002, 2019–2022) ===
The Ferrari Challenge series held races, as support to the first three United States Grand Prix events. Beginning in 2019, the championship returned to IMS with a stand-alone event, featuring four races over two series. All participating cars: Ferrari.

| Year | Date | Series | Winning driver | Race distance | |
| Year | Date | Series | Winning driver | Miles | Laps |
|---|---|---|---|---|---|
| 2000 | September 24 | Trofeo Pirelli | (United States) Steve Earle | 39.1 | 15 |
| 2001 | September 30 | Trofeo Pirelli | (United States) Steve Earle | 33.9 | 13 |
| 2002 | September 29 | Trofeo Pirelli | (Republic of Ireland) Michael Cullen | 31.3 | 12 |
| 2019 | July 27 | Trofeo Pirelli | (Chile) Benjamin Hites | 48.8 | 20 |
| 2019 | July 27 | Coppa Shell | (United States) Dale Katechis | 41.5 | 17 |
| 2019 | July 28 | Trofeo Pirelli | (Chile) Benjamin Hites | 48.8 | 20 |
| 2019 | July 28 | Coppa Shell | (United States) Mark Issa | 46.3 | 19 |
| 2020 | July 25 | Trofeo Pirelli | (United States) Cooper MacNeil | 51.2 | 21 |
| 2020 | July 25 | Coppa Shell | (United States) Kevan Millstein | 41.5 | 17 |
| 2020 | July 26 | Trofeo Pirelli | (United States) Cooper MacNeil | 51.2 | 21 |
| 2020 | July 26 | Coppa Shell | (United States) Kevan Millstein | 48.8 | 20 |
| 2021 | July 17 | Trofeo Pirelli | (United States) Jason McCarthy | 51.2 | 21 |
| 2021 | July 17 | Coppa Shell | (United States) Jeremy Clarke | 39.0 | 16 |
| 2021 | July 18 | Trofeo Pirelli | (United States) Jason McCarthy | 51.2 | 21 |
| 2021 | July 18 | Coppa Shell | (United States) Jeremy Clarke | 34.1 | 14 |
| 2022 | July 16 | Trofeo Pirelli | (United States) Jason McCarthy | 51.2 | 21 |
| 2022 | July 16 | Coppa Shell | (United States) Chuck Whittall | 34.1 | 14 |
| 2022 | July 17 | Trofeo Pirelli | (United States) Jason McCarthy | 36.6 | 15 |
| 2022 | July 17 | Coppa Shell | (United States) Michael Petramalo | 43.9 | 18 |

=== Formula BMW (2004–2007) ===
The Formula BMW USA series held twin races, as support to the United States Grand Prix.

| Year | Date | Winning driver | Race distance | |
| Year | Date | Winning driver | Miles | Laps |
|---|---|---|---|---|
| 2004 | June 19 | (United States) Jonathan Summerton | 36.5 | 14 |
| 2004 | June 20 | (United States) Matt Jaskol | 36.5 | 14 |
| 2005 | June 18 | (Australia) James Davison | 33.9 | 13 |
| 2005 | June 19 | (France) Richard Philippe | 33.9 | 13 |
| 2006 | July 1 | (Canada) Robert Wickens | 39.1 | 15 |
| 2006 | July 2 | (Monaco) Stefano Coletti | 39.1 | 15 |
| 2007 | June 16 | (Canada) Daniel Morad | 39.1 | 15 |
| 2007 | June 17 | (Mexico) Esteban Gutiérrez | 39.1 | 15 |

=== Porsche Carrera Cup North America (2007, 2021–present) ===
The Porsche Carrera Cup North America, which replaced the IMSA GT3 Cup Challenge in 2021, holds twin races. It was held as support to the United States Grand Prix in 2007. All participating cars: Porsche 911 GT3 Cup.

| Year | Date | Winning driver | Race distance | |
| Year | Date | Winning driver | Miles | Laps |
|---|---|---|---|---|
| 2007 | June 16 | (United States) Charles Scardina | 46.9 | 18 |
| 2007 | June 17 | (United States) Bryce Miller | 49.5 | 19 |
| 2021 | September 11 | (United Kingdom) Sebastian Priaulx | 72.6 | 28 |
| 2021 | September 12 | (Canada) Parker Thompson | 64.8 | 25 |
| 2021 | September 12 | (United Kingdom) Sebastian Priaulx | 51.8 | 20 |
| 2022 | September 3 | (Canada) Parker Thompson | 63.4 | 26 |
| 2022 | September 4 | (United States) Riley Dickinson | 61.0 | 25 |

=== Brickyard Vintage Racing Invitational (2014–2019, 2022–present) ===
The Brickyard Vintage Racing Invitational is a series of races for various classes of vintage racing automobiles. The event is sanctioned by the Sportscar Vintage Racing Association. The event returned in 2022 after a two-year absence.

| Year | Date | Race name | Winning driver | Car | Race distance | | Class group |
| Year | Date | Race name | Winning driver | Car | Miles | Laps | Class group |
|---|---|---|---|---|---|---|---|
| 2014 | June 6 | Hawk Performance Vintage/Classic Enduro | (United States) Frank Beck | 1972 Porsche 914 | 75.6 | 31 | 1, 2, 3, 4, 5a, 6a, 8 |
| 2014 | June 6 | Hawk Performance Historic GT/GTP Enduro | (United States) Travis Engen | 2005 Audi R8 | 117.1 | 48 | 5b, 6b, 7, 9, 10 |
| 2014 | June 7 | Unnamed (1st race this date) | (United States) Kurt Fazekas | 1985 Porsche 944 | 19.5 | 8 | 8 |
| 2014 | June 7 | Unnamed (2nd race this date) | (United States) Paddins Dowling | 1939 Maserati 4CL | 19.5 | 8 | PW |
| 2014 | June 7 | Unnamed (3rd race this date) | (United States) Travis Engen | 1970 Chevron B17b | 19.5 | 8 | 2 |
| 2014 | June 7 | Unnamed (4th race this date) | (United States) Jim Pace | 1968 McLaren M6B | 19.5 | 8 | 7 |
| 2014 | June 7 | Unnamed (5th race this date) | (United States) Curt Vogt | 1970 Ford Mustang | 19.5 | 8 | 6.2 |
| 2014 | June 7 | Unnamed (6th race this date) | (United States) Hobart Buppert | 1969 Lola T70 MKIII | 19.5 | 8 | 5 |
| 2014 | June 8 | Indy Legends Charity Pro/Am | (United States) Al Unser Jr. (Canada) Peter Klutt | 1969 Chevrolet Corvette | 51.2 | 21 | 6.1, 6.2 |
| 2014 | June 8 | Unnamed (2nd race this date) | (United States) Brian French | 1997 Benetton B197 | 19.5 | 8 | 9 |
| 2014 | June 8 | Unnamed (3rd race this date) | (United States) William Carson | 1967 MG Midget | 19.5 | 8 | 1 |
| 2014 | June 8 | Unnamed (4th race this date) | (United States) Jeffrey Bernatovich | 1990 Chevrolet Corvette | 19.5 | 8 | 10 |
| 2014 | June 8 | Unnamed (5th race this date) | (United States) Goran Nyberg | 1965 Volvo P1800 | 19.5 | 8 | 3, 4 |
| 2014 | June 8 | Unnamed (6th race this date) | (United States) Craig Bennett | 1974 Shadow DN4 | 19.5 | 8 | 11 |
| 2014 | June 8 | Unnamed (7th race this date) | (United States) Jody O'Donnell | 1969 Chevrolet Corvette | 19.5 | 8 | 6.1 |
| 2015 | June 13 | Unnamed (1st race this date) | (United States) Chris MacAllister | 1972 J.W. Automotive Mirage M6 | 34.1 | 14 | 7 |
| 2015 | June 13 | Unnamed (2nd race this date) | (United States) Brady Refenning | 1974 Porsche 911 | 31.7 | 13 | 6.2 |
| 2015 | June 13 | Unnamed (3rd race this date) | (United States) Rex Barrett | 1933 Ford Indy Car | 24.4 | 10 | PW |
| 2015 | June 13 | Unnamed (4th race this date) | (United States) Travis Engen | 2005 Audi R8 | 34.1 | 14 | 11 |
| 2015 | June 13 | Unnamed (5th race this date) | (United States) Patrick Ryan | 1967 Triumph Spitfire | 24.4 | 10 | 1, FJr, 3.2 |
| 2015 | June 13 | Unnamed (6th race this date) | (United States) Ike Keeler | 1990 Oldsmobile Cutlass | 34.1 | 14 | 10 |
| 2015 | June 13 | Indy Legends Charity Pro/Am | (United States) Bob Lazier (United States) Jim Caudle | 1969 Chevrolet Corvette | 48.8 | 20 | 6.1, 6.2 |
| 2015 | June 13 | Unnamed (8th race this date) | (United States) Travis Engen | 1970 Chevron B17b | 26.8 | 11 | 2 |
| 2015 | June 13 | Unnamed (9th race this date) | (United States) Stephen Steers | 1958 Echidna Roadster | 26.8 | 11 | 3.1, 4 |
| 2015 | June 13 | Unnamed (10th race this date) | (United States) James French | 1997 Jordan 197 | 29.3 | 12 | 9 |
| 2015 | June 13 | Unnamed (11th race this date) | (United States) Jody O'Donnell | 1969 Chevrolet Corvette | 29.3 | 12 | 6.1 |
| 2015 | June 13 | Unnamed (12th race this date) | (United States) Jim Hamblin | 1968 Porsche 911 | 26.8 | 11 | 8 |
| 2015 | June 13 | Unnamed (13th race this date) | (United States) David Jacobs | 1966 Lola T70 MKII | 7.3 | 4 | 5 |
| 2015 | June 14 | Hawk Performance Vintage/Classic Enduro | (United States) Gray Gregory (United States) Randy Buck | 1969 Chevron B16 | 80.5 | 33 | 1, 3.1, 4, 5, 6.2, 8 |
| 2015 | June 14 | Hawk Performance Historic GT/GTP Enduro | (United States) Travis Engen | 2005 Audi R8 | 92.7 | 38 | 6.1, 6.2, 7, 9, 10, 11 |
| 2016 | June 18 | Unnamed (1st race this date) | (United States) David Fershtand | 2005 Chevrolet Corvette | 24.4 | 10 | 10 |
| 2016 | June 18 | Unnamed (2nd race this date) | (United States) Travis Engen | 2005 Audi R8 | 26.8 | 11 | 11, F5k |
| 2016 | June 18 | Unnamed (3rd race this date) | (Canada) Jacek Mucha | 2007 Panoz DP01 | 24.4 | 10 | 9 |
| 2016 | June 18 | Unnamed (4th race this date) | (United States) Paddins Dowling | 1934 ERA R2A | 19.5 | 8 | PW |
| 2016 | June 18 | Hawk Performance Vintage/Classic Enduro | (United States) Scott Kissinger | 1971 Datsun 240Z | 70.8 | 29 | 1, 3, 5, 8 |
| 2016 | June 18 | Indy Legends Charity Pro/Am | (United States) Robby Unser (Germany) André Ahrlé | 1965 Cobra CompR | 60.8 | 25 | 6 |
| 2016 | June 18 | Unnamed (7th race this date) | (United States) Alex MacAllister | 1971 Chevron B19 | 26.8 | 11 | 5, 7 |
| 2016 | June 18 | Unnamed (8th race this date) | (United States) Steve Patti | 1963 Ginetta G4 | 19.5 | 8 | 3, 4 |
| 2016 | June 18 | Unnamed (9th race this date) | (United States) Bob Koons | 1961 Lotus 20 | 22.0 | 9 | 1 |
| 2016 | June 18 | Unnamed (10th race this date) | (United States) Richard Nichols | 1971 Datsun 240Z | 19.5 | 8 | 8, 12a |
| 2016 | June 18 | Unnamed (11th race this date) | (United States) Curt Vogt | 1970 Ford Mustang | 19.5 | 8 | 6a |
| 2016 | June 18 | Unnamed (12th race this date) | (Canada) Peter Klutt | 1969 Chevrolet Corvette | 22.0 | 9 | 6b, 12b |
| 2016 | June 19 | Hawk Performance Historic GT/GTP Enduro | (United States) Travis Engen | 2005 Audi R8 | 136.6 | 56 | 6, 7, 9, 10, 11, 12b |
| 2016 | June 19 | Unnamed (2nd race this date) | (United States) Kirk Blaha | 1970 Datsun 240Z | 19.5 | 8 | 8, 12a |
| 2016 | June 19 | Unnamed (3rd race this date) | (United States) Steve Patti | 1963 Ginetta G4 | 19.5 | 8 | 3, 4 |
| 2016 | June 19 | Unnamed (4th race this date) | (United States) Alex MacAllister | 1971 Chevron B19 | 26.8 | 11 | 5, 7 |
| 2016 | June 19 | Unnamed (5th race this date) | (United States) Ron Hornig | 1971 Brabham BT35 | 19.5 | 8 | 2 |
| 2016 | June 19 | Unnamed (6th race this date) | (Netherlands) Niek Hommerson | 2004 Maserati MC12 | 26.8 | 11 | 11, F5k |
| 2016 | June 19 | Unnamed (7th race this date) | (United States) Scott Hackenson | 1967 Ford Mustang | 24.4 | 10 | 6a |
| 2016 | June 19 | Unnamed (8th race this date) | (United States) Jody O'Donnell | 1969 Chevrolet Corvette | 19.5 | 8 | 6b, 12b |
| 2016 | June 19 | Unnamed (9th race this date) | (Canada) Jacek Mucha | 2007 Panoz DP01 | 24.4 | 10 | 9 |
| 2017 | June 17 | Unnamed (1st race this date) | (United States) Bob Hatle | 1989 Swift DB-3 | 22.0 | 9 | 2 |
| 2017 | June 17 | Unnamed (2nd race this date) | (United States) Jesse Prather | 1961 Elva Courier | 22.0 | 9 | 1, 3, 4 |
| 2017 | June 17 | Unnamed (3rd race this date) | (United States) John Harrold | 1978 Chevron B36 | 22.0 | 9 | 5, 7 |
| 2017 | June 17 | Unnamed (4th race this date) | (United States) Kurt Fazekas | 2014 Porsche 911 GT3 Cup | 22.0 | 9 | 10, 12b |
| 2017 | June 17 | Unnamed (5th race this date) | (Canada) Jacek Mucha | 2006 Swift JMS 016 | 22.0 | 9 | 9, 11 |
| 2017 | June 17 | Unnamed (6th race this date) | (United States) Steve Walker | 1973 BMW CSL | 22.0 | 9 | 8, 12a |
| 2017 | June 17 | Indy Legends Charity Pro/Am | (United States) Sarah Fisher (United States) Kirk Blaha | 1969 Chevrolet Corvette | 58.4 | 24 | 6 |
| 2017 | June 17 | Unnamed (8th race this date) | (United States) Jody O'Donnell | 1969 Chevrolet Corvette | 2.4 | 1 | 6 |
| 2017 | June 18 | Hawk Performance Vintage/Classic Enduro | (United States) Shannon Ivey | 1967 Chevrolet Camaro | 70.8 | 29 | 3, 5, 6, 8, 12 |
| 2017 | June 18 | Hawk Performance Historic GT/GTP Enduro | (United States) Peter McLaughlin (United States) Dave Handy | 1983 March 832 | 122 | 50 | 7, 9, 10 |
| 2017 | June 18 | Unnamed (3rd race this date) | (United States) Michael LeVeque | 1961 Yenko Stinger | 19.5 | 8 | 1, 3, 4 |
| 2017 | June 18 | Unnamed (4th race this date) | (United States) Steve Walker | 1973 BMW CSL | 19.5 | 8 | 8, 12a |
| 2017 | June 18 | Unnamed (5th race this date) | (United States) Bob Hatle | 1989 Swift DB-3 | 19.5 | 8 | 2 |
| 2017 | June 18 | Unnamed (6th race this date) | (Canada) Jacek Mucha | 2006 Swift JMS 016 | 19.5 | 8 | 9, 11 |
| 2017 | June 18 | Unnamed (7th race this date) | (United States) John Harrold | 1978 Chevron B36 | 19.5 | 8 | 5, 7 |
| 2017 | June 18 | Unnamed (8th race this date) | (United States) Jody O'Donnell | 1969 Chevrolet Corvette | 19.5 | 8 | 6 |
| 2017 | June 18 | Unnamed (9th race this date) | (United States) Samuel LeComte | 2006 Chevrolet Monte Carlo | 19.5 | 8 | 10, 12b |
| 2018 | June 16 | Unnamed (1st race this date) | (United States) Joey Essma | 1969 Datsun 2000 | 24.4 | 10 | 1, 3, 4 |
| 2018 | June 16 | Unnamed (2nd race this date) | (Australia) Geoff Brabham | 1971 Brabham BT35 | 24.4 | 10 | 2 |
| 2018 | June 16 | Unnamed (3rd race this date) | (United States) Don Yount | 2007 Oreca Challenge Car | 29.3 | 12 | 5, 7, 11 |
| 2018 | June 16 | Unnamed (4th race this date) | (United States) Rick Dittman | 2006 Chevrolet Corvette | 14.6 | 6 | 10, 12a |
| 2018 | June 16 | Unnamed (5th race this date) | (United States) Brian French | 1997 Benetton B197 | 31.7 | 13 | 9 |
| 2018 | June 16 | Unnamed (6th race this date) | (United States) Howard Liebengood | 2002 BMW M3 | 19.5 | 8 | 8, 12b |
| 2018 | June 16 | Indy Legends Charity Pro/Am Presented by Racer Magazine | (Australia) Matthew Brabham (United States) Michael Donohue | 1963 Chevrolet Corvette | 65.6 | 27 | 6 |
| 2018 | June 16 | Unnamed (8th race this date) | (Canada) Gary Klutt | 1969 Chevrolet Corvette | 17.1 | 7 | 6 |
| 2018 | June 17 | Hawk Performance Historic GT/GTP Enduro | (United States) Travis Engen | 2001 Lola T97/20 | 134.2 | 55 | 5, 7, 9, 10, 11 |
| 2018 | June 17 | Hawk Performance Vintage/Classic Enduro | (United States) Neville Agass (United States) Reese Cox | 1994 Ford Mustang Saleen | 80.5 | 33 | 1, 3, 5, 6, 8, 12 |
| 2018 | June 17 | Unnamed (3rd race this date) | (United States) Joey Essma | 1969 Datsun 2000 | 19.5 | 8 | 1, 3, 4 |
| 2018 | June 17 | Unnamed (4th race this date) | (United States) Howard Liebengood | 2002 BMW M3 | 19.5 | 8 | 8, 12b |
| 2018 | June 17 | Unnamed (5th race this date) | (Australia) Geoff Brabham | 1971 Brabham BT35 | 17.1 | 7 | 2 |
| 2018 | June 17 | Unnamed (6th race this date) | (United States) Brian French | 1997 Benetton B197 | 26.8 | 11 | 9 |
| 2018 | June 17 | Unnamed (7th race this date) | (Canada) Gary Klutt | 1969 Chevrolet Corvette | 22.0 | 9 | 6 |
| 2018 | June 17 | Unnamed (8th race this date) | (United States) Don Yount | 2007 Oreca Challenge Car | 19.5 | 8 | 5, 7, 11 |
| 2018 | June 17 | Unnamed (9th race this date) | (United States) Casey Putsch | 1989 Chevrolet Corvette | 19.5 | 8 | 10, 12a |
| 2019 | Aug 3 | Unnamed (1st race this date) | (United States) John Nash | 1962 Lotus Super Seven | 24.4 | 10 | 1, 3, 4 |
| 2019 | Aug 3 | Unnamed (2nd race this date) | (United Kingdom) Andy Pilgrim | 1973 Crosslé 25F | 19.5 | 8 | 2a |
| 2019 | Aug 3 | Unnamed (3rd race this date) | (United Kingdom) Andy Pilgrim | 2011 Ferrari 458 GT3 | 31.7 | 13 | 10, 12a |
| 2019 | Aug 3 | Unnamed (4th race this date) | (United States) Travis Engen | 2005 Audi R8 | 24.4 | 10 | 5, 7, 11 |
| 2019 | Aug 3 | Unnamed (5th race this date) | (United States) Travis Engen | 2001 Lola T97/20 | 34.1 | 14 | 9 |
| 2019 | Aug 3 | Unnamed (6th race this date) | (United States) Ron Hornig | 1971 Brabham BT35 | 19.5 | 8 | 2b |
| 2019 | Aug 3 | Unnamed (7th race this date) | (United States) Howard Liebengood | 2002 BMW M3 | 26.8 | 11 | 8, 12b |
| 2019 | Aug 3 | VROC Charity Pro/Am Presented by Chopard Watch | (United States) Willy T. Ribbs (United States) Ed Sevadjian | 1969 Chevrolet Corvette | 60.8 | 25 | 6 |
| 2019 | Aug 3 | Unnamed (9th race this date) | (United States) Scott Borchetta | 1972 Chevrolet Corvette | 19.5 | 8 | 6 |
| 2019 | Aug 4 | Vintage/Classic Enduro | (United States) Clair Schwendeman | 1968 Chevrolet Corvette | 78.1 | 32 | 1, 5, 6, 8, 12 |
| 2019 | Aug 4 | Historic GT/GTP Enduro | (United States) Travis Engen | 2005 Audi R8 | 92.7 | 38 | 5, 6, 7, 10, 11, 12 |
| 2019 | Aug 4 | Unnamed (3rd race this date) | (United States) John Nash | 1962 Lotus Super Seven | 19.5 | 8 | 1, 3, 4 |
| 2019 | Aug 4 | Unnamed (4th race this date) | (United States) William Alverson | 2006 BMW M3 | 22.0 | 9 | 8, 12b |
| 2019 | Aug 4 | Unnamed (5th race this date) | (United States) Travis Engen | 2001 Lola T97/20 | 26.8 | 11 | 9 |
| 2019 | Aug 4 | Unnamed (6th race this date) | (United States) Travis Engen | 1971 Chevron B17b | 14.6 | 6 | FF |
| 2019 | Aug 4 | Unnamed (7th race this date) | (United States) Jeremy Treadway | 1981 Van Diemen RF81 | 29.3 | 12 | FF |
| 2019 | Aug 4 | Unnamed (8th race this date) | (United States) Scott Borchetta | 1972 Chevrolet Corvette | 22.0 | 9 | 6 |
| 2019 | Aug 4 | Unnamed (9th race this date) | (United States) Travis Engen | 2005 Audi R8 | 24.4 | 10 | 5, 7, 11 |
| 2019 | Aug 4 | Unnamed (10th race this date) | (United States) Bruce Raymond | 1985 Pontiac Firebird | 19.5 | 8 | 10, 12a |
| 2022 | June 17 | SAAC Vintage Race | (United States) Jim Guthrie | 1966 Shelby GT350 | Unknown | | V47 |
| 2022 | June 18 | Unnamed (1st race this date) | (United States) Jimmy Vasser | 1978 Crosslé 32F | Unknown | | 2FF |
| 2022 | June 18 | Unnamed (2nd race this date) | (United States) Travis Engen | 2005 Audi R8 | Unknown | | 7, 10GT, 11 |
| 2022 | June 18 | Unnamed (3rd race this date) | (United States) Scott Borchetta | 1969 Chevrolet Corvette | Unknown | | 6 |
| 2022 | June 18 | Unnamed (4th race this date) | (United States) Leo Basile | 1965 Cooper T75 | Unknown | | 2FV |
| 2022 | June 18 | Unnamed (5th race this date) | (United States) Chris DeMinco | 1971 Mallock 11B | Unknown | | 1, 3, 4, 5b |
| 2022 | June 18 | Unnamed (6th race this date) | (United States) Joe Nemechek | 2006 Toyota Camry | Unknown | | 10SC |
| 2022 | June 18 | Unnamed (7th race this date) | (Estonia) Tõnis Kasemets | 1969 Brabham BT29 | Unknown | | 2FB, 5a |
| 2022 | June 18 | Unnamed (8th race this date) | (United States) Craig Hillis | 1969 Porsche 968 | Unknown | | 8, 12 |
| 2022 | June 18 | Unnamed (9th race this date) | (United States) Stuart Crow | 1994 RT 41 | Unknown | | 9 |
| 2022 | June 19 | Unnamed (1st race this date) | (United States) Jimmy Vasser | 1978 Crosslé 32F | Unknown | | 2FF |
| 2022 | June 19 | Unnamed (2nd race this date) | (United States) Stuart Crow | 1994 RT 41 | Unknown | | 9 |
| 2022 | June 19 | Unnamed (3rd race this date) | (Canada) Peter Klutt | 1969 Chevrolet Corvette | Unknown | | 6 |
| 2022 | June 19 | Unnamed (4th race this date) | (United States) Leo Basile | 1965 Cooper T75 | Unknown | | 2FV |
| 2022 | June 19 | Unnamed (5th race this date) | (United States) Travis Engen | 2005 Audi R8 | Unknown | | 7, 10GT, 11 |
| 2022 | June 19 | Unnamed (6th race this date) | (Australia) Geoff Brabham | 1971 Brabham BT35 | Unknown | | 2FB, 5a |
| 2022 | June 19 | Unnamed (7th race this date) | (United States) Chris DeMinco | 1971 Mallock 11B | Unknown | | 1, 3, 4, 5b |
| 2022 | June 19 | Unnamed (8th race this date) | (United States) Mark Hupfer | 1979 Porsche 911SC | Unknown | | 8, 12 |
| 2022 | June 19 | Unnamed (9th race this date) | (United States) Joe Nemechek | 2006 Toyota Camry | Unknown | | 10SC |
| 2022 | June 19 | Vintage/Classic Historic GT/GTP Endurance Race | (United States) Travis Engen | 2005 Audi R8 | Unknown | | 1, 3, 5a, 8, 9, 10GT, 11, 12 |
| 2023 | June 17 | Unnamed (1st race this date) | (United States) Camden Murphy | 2007 Toyota Camry | Unknown | | Stock Cars |
| 2023 | June 17 | Unnamed (2nd race this date) | (United States) Dave Handy | 1969 Brabham BT29 | Unknown | | 2 |
| 2023 | June 17 | Unnamed (3rd race this date) | (United States) Jerry Robinson | 2010 Dodge Viper | Unknown | | 6, 12a |
| 2023 | June 17 | Unnamed (4th race this date) | (United States) Aaron Weiss | 2013 Praga R1T | Unknown | | 5a, 7, 10GT, 11 |
| 2023 | June 17 | Unnamed (5th race this date) | (United States) Mark Edwards | 1982 Glamdring None | Unknown | | 1FV |
| 2023 | June 17 | Unnamed (6th race this date) | (United States) Derek Schardt | 1994 BMW M3 | Unknown | | 5b, 8, 12b |
| 2023 | June 17 | Unnamed (7th race this date) | (New Zealand) Anton Julian | 1965 Lotus Elan | Unknown | | 1, 3, 4 |
| 2023 | June 17 | Unnamed (8th race this date) | (United States) Nathan Byrd | 2017 AF 01 | Unknown | | 9 |
| 2023 | June 18 | Unnamed (1st race this date) | (Australia) Geoff Brabham | 1971 Brabham BT35 | Unknown | | 2 |
| 2023 | June 18 | Unnamed (2nd race this date) | (United States) Jerry Robinson | 2010 Dodge Viper | Unknown | | 6, 12a |
| 2023 | June 18 | Unnamed (3rd race this date) | (United States) Nathan Byrd | 2017 AF 01 | Unknown | | 9 |
| 2023 | June 18 | Unnamed (4th race this date) | (United States) Carter Boles | 1969 Zinc C4 | Unknown | | 1FV |
| 2023 | June 18 | Unnamed (5th race this date) | (United States) Aaron Weiss | 2013 Praga R1T | Unknown | | 5a, 7, 10GT, 11 |
| 2023 | June 18 | Unnamed (6th race this date) | (United States) Joey Essma | 1969 Datsun 2000 | Unknown | | 1, 3, 4 |
| 2023 | June 18 | Unnamed (7th race this date) | (Ecuador) Efrin Ormaza | 1994 Spec Racer Ford | Unknown | | 5b, 8, 12b |
| 2023 | June 18 | Unnamed (8th race this date) | (United States) Joe Nemechek | 2007 Chevrolet Silverado | Unknown | | Stock Cars |
| 2023 | June 18 | Forgeline Yenko Spirit Classic | (United States) Michael LeVeque | 1966 Chevrolet Yenko Stinger Classic | Unknown | | 3, 12b |
| 2023 | June 18 | FV 60th Anniversary | (United States) Carter Boles | 1969 Zinc C4 | Unknown | | 1FV |
| 2023 | June 18 | SVRA Endurance Series | (United States) Aaron Weiss | 2013 Praga R1T | Unknown | | All classes |

- Event Grand Marshalls
  - 2014: Parnelli Jones
  - 2015: Al Unser Sr.
  - 2016: Donald Davidson
  - 2017: Bobby Unser
  - 2018: Johnny Rutherford
  - 2019: Lyn St. James

=== Formula 4 United States Championship (2017) ===
The Formula 4 United States Championship held twin races as support to Sportscar Vintage Racing Association sanctioned racing. All participating cars: Crawford / Honda

| Year | Date | Winning driver | Race distance | |
| Year | Date | Winning driver | Miles | Laps |
|---|---|---|---|---|
| 2017 | June 10 | (United States) Kyle Kirkwood | 31.7 | 13 |
| 2017 | June 11 | (United States) Kyle Kirkwood | 48.8 | 20 |
| 2017 | June 11 | (United States) Kyle Kirkwood | 48.8 | 20 |

=== Trans-Am Series (2017–2019, 2023) ===
The Trans-Am Series held twin races, with the TA2 class competing in one while the remaining classes ran concurrently in the other. When the series returned in 2023 after a three-year absence, the TA2 race was dropped. It is held in support of the Brickyard Vintage Racing Invitational. The 2018 event was run in conjunction with the Trans-Am West Coast Championship.

| Year | Date | Class | Winning driver | Car | Race distance | |
| Year | Date | Class | Winning driver | Car | Miles | Laps |
|---|---|---|---|---|---|---|
| 2017 | June 17 | TA | (United States) Ernie Francis Jr. | Ford Mustang | 102.5 | 42 |
| 2017 | June 17 | TA3 | (United States) Mark Boden | Porsche 911 GT3 Cup | 102.5 | 42 |
| 2017 | June 17 | TA4 | (United States) Andrew Entwistle | Ford Mustang | 102.5 | 42 |
| 2017 | June 18 | TA2 | (United States) Gar Robinson | Chevrolet Camaro | 102.5 | 42 |
| 2018 | June 16 | TA2 | (United States) Jordan Bupp | Ford Mustang | 102.5 | 42 |
| 2018 | June 17 | TA | (United States) Ernie Francis Jr. | Ford Mustang | 102.5 | 42 |
| 2018 | June 17 | TA3 | (United States) Tim Kezman | Porsche 991 GT3 Cup | 102.5 | 42 |
| 2018 | June 17 | TA4 | (United States) Warren Dexter | Ginetta G55 | 102.5 | 42 |
| 2019 | Aug 3 | TA | (United States) Chris Dyson | Ford Mustang | 102.5 | 42 |
| 2019 | Aug 3 | SGT | (United States) Tim Kezman | Porsche 991 GT3 Cup | 102.5 | 42 |
| 2019 | Aug 3 | GT | (United States) Steven Davison | Aston Martin Vantage | 102.5 | 42 |
| 2019 | Aug 4 | TA2 | (United States) Marc Miller | Dodge Challenger | 102.5 | 42 |
| 2023 | June 17 | TA | (Australia) Matthew Brabham | Ford Mustang | 102.5 | 42 |
| 2023 | June 17 | XGT | (United States) Danny Lowry | Mercedes-AMG GT3 | 102.5 | 42 |
| 2023 | June 17 | SGT | (United States) Lee Saunders | Dodge Viper | 102.5 | 42 |
| 2023 | June 17 | GT | (United States) Billy Griffin | Ford Mustang | 102.5 | 42 |

=== Global MX-5 Cup (2017, 2020) ===
The Global MX-5 Cup held twin races, as support to the Brickyard Vintage Racing Invitational in 2017 and the IndyCar Harvest Grand Prix in 2020. All participating cars: Spec Miata.

| Year | Date | Winning driver | Race distance | |
| Year | Date | Winning driver | Miles | Laps |
|---|---|---|---|---|
| 2017 | June 16 | (United States) Robert Stout | 63.4 | 26 |
| 2017 | June 17 | (United States) Patrick Gallagher | 61.0 | 25 |
| 2020 | Sep 4 | (United States) Selin Rollan | 65.9 | 27 |
| 2020 | Sep 4 | (United States) Todd Lamb | 63.4 | 26 |

=== SCCA National Championship Runoffs (2017, 2021) ===
The SCCA National Championship Runoffs is a series of end-of-year championship races for various classes of automobiles. One of the largest annual gatherings of amateur road racing drivers in the world, the event is sanctioned by the Sports Car Club of America and frequently rotates venues.

| Year | Date | Winning driver | Region | Car | Race distance | | Class |
| Year | Date | Winning driver | Region | Car | Miles | Laps | Class |
|---|---|---|---|---|---|---|---|
| 2017 | September 29 | (United States) David Daughtery | Indianapolis | 2013 Mini Cooper | 46.7 | 18 | B-Spec |
| 2017 | September 29 | (United States) Eric Prill | Kansas | 1990 Mazda Miata | 46.7 | 18 | F Production |
| 2017 | September 29 | (United States) Keith Grant | Atlanta | Swift 016.a Mazda | 49.2 | 19 | Formula Atlantic |
| 2017 | September 29 | (United Kingdom) Matthew Cowley | Central Florida | Mygale FF Honda | 49.2 | 19 | Formula F |
| 2017 | September 29 | (United States) Andrew Aquilante | Philadelphia | Chevrolet Corvette | 49.2 | 19 | GT-2 |
| 2017 | September 29 | (United States) Jeff Shafer | California | Stohr WF1 Suzuki | 49.2 | 19 | Prototype 2 |
| 2017 | September 29 | (United States) Preston Pardus | Central Florida | 1999 Mazda Miata | 49.2 | 19 | Spec Miata |
| 2017 | September 29 | (United States) Mike Miserendino | California | SCCA Spec Racer Ford | 49.2 | 19 | Spec Racer Ford |
| 2017 | September 29 | (United States) Andrew Aquilante | Philadelphia | 2014 Ford Mustang | 49.2 | 19 | Touring 1 |
| 2017 | September 29 | (United States) Derek Kulach | Colorado | 2006 Nissan 350Z | 49.2 | 19 | Touring 3 |
| 2017 | September 30 | (United States) Brian Long | Chicago | Ford Mustang | 49.2 | 19 | American Sedan |
| 2017 | September 30 | (United States) Kip Van Steenburg | Central Florida | 1991 Porsche 994 S2 | 49.2 | 19 | E Production |
| 2017 | September 30 | (United States) Alex Mayer | Philadelphia | JDR Suzuki | 38.9 | 15 | Formula 1000 |
| 2017 | September 30 | (United States) Austin McCusker | New York | Van Diemen RF02 | 49.2 | 19 | Formula Continental |
| 2017 | September 30 | (United States) Melvin Kemper Jr. | Northwest | Star Formula Mazda | 49.2 | 19 | Formula Mazda |
| 2017 | September 30 | (Canada) Collin Jackson | Oregon | Nissan 240SX | 49.2 | 19 | GT-3 |
| 2017 | September 30 | (United States) Jonathan Eriksen | Mohawk Hudson | Stohr WF1 Suzuki | 38.9 | 15 | Prototype 1 |
| 2017 | September 30 | (United States) Tray Ayres | Atlanta | SCCA Spec Racer Ford Gen3 | 49.2 | 19 | Spec Racer Ford Gen3 |
| 2017 | September 30 | (United States) Adam Roberts | Ohio Valley | Honda CR-X Si | 49.2 | 19 | Super Touring Lite |
| 2017 | September 30 | (United States) John Buttermore | Detroit | 2003 Chevrolet Corvette (C5) | 49.2 | 19 | Touring 2 |
| 2017 | October 1 | (United States) Wiley McMahan | Middle Georgia | Scorpion S1 Suzuki | 46.7 | 18 | Formula 500 |
| 2017 | October 1 | (United States) Elliot Finlayson | Chicago | Mazda FE | 49.2 | 19 | Formula Enterprises |
| 2017 | October 1 | (United States) Michael Varacins | Chicago | Speed Sport AM-5 | 49.2 | 19 | Formula Vee |
| 2017 | October 1 | (United States) David Pintaric | Mahoning Valley | Cadillac CTS-V | 49.2 | 19 | GT-1 |
| 2017 | October 1 | (United States) Christopher Bovis | Chicago | Honda CR-X | 49.2 | 19 | GT-Lite |
| 2017 | October 1 | (United States) Jason Isley | California | 2015 Toyota Yaris | 49.2 | 19 | H Production |
| 2017 | October 1 | (United States) Max Gee | Neohio | Honda Prelude | 49.2 | 19 | Super Touring Under |
| 2017 | October 1 | (United States) Darren Seltzer | Central Florida | 2016 Scion FR-S | 49.2 | 19 | Touring 4 |
| 2021 | October 1 | (United States) David Daughtery | Central Carolinas | 2009 Mini Cooper | 44.1 | 17 | B-Spec |
| 2021 | October 1 | (United States) Scott Rettich | Ohio Valley | SCCA Mazda FE2 | 49.2 | 19 | Formula Enterprises 2 |
| 2021 | October 1 | (United States) Andrew Whitston | Milwaukee | Protoform P2 | 49.2 | 19 | Formula Vee |
| 2021 | October 1 | (United States) Scott Twomey | Northwest | Toyota Tercel | 49.2 | 19 | GT-Lite |
| 2021 | October 1 | (United States) Steve Sargis | Blackhawk Valley | 1975 Triumph Spitfire | 23.3 | 9 | H Production |
| 2021 | October 1 | (United States) Lee Alexander | Tennessee | Stohr WF1 Suzuki | 49.2 | 19 | Prototype 1 |
| 2021 | October 1 | (United States) Preston Pardus | Central Florida | 2003 Mazda Miata | 49.2 | 19 | Spec Miata |
| 2021 | October 1 | (United States) Kurt Rezzetano | Philadelphia | 2013 Ford Mustang GT | 49.2 | 19 | Touring 2 |
| 2021 | October 1 | (United States) John Heinricy | Detroit | 2018 Toyota 86 | 33.7 | 13 | Touring 4 |
| 2021 | October 2 | (United States) James Jost | Philadelphia | Ford Mustang GT | 49.2 | 19 | American Sedan |
| 2021 | October 2 | (United States) Cliff Ira | Kansas City | 1996 Honda CR-X del Sol | 41.5 | 16 | F Production |
| 2021 | October 2 | (United States) James French | Milwaukee | Ralt RT41 Toyota | 31.1 | 12 | Formula Atlantic |
| 2021 | October 2 | (United States) Simon Sikes | Atlanta | Citation US2000 | 49.2 | 19 | Formula Continental |
| 2021 | October 2 | (United States) Jonathan Kotyk | Buccaneer | Mygale SJ14 Honda | 49.2 | 19 | Formula F |
| 2021 | October 2 | (United States) Tim Kezman | Milwaukee | Porsche 991.2 GT3 | 44.1 | 17 | GT-2 |
| 2021 | October 2 | (United States) Tim Day Jr. | San Francisco | Stohr WF1 Suzuki | 49.2 | 19 | Prototype 2 |
| 2021 | October 2 | (South Africa) Danny Steyn | Florida | Mazda MX-5 | 46.7 | 18 | Super Touring Lite |
| 2021 | October 2 | (United States) Joe Moser | Detroit | Honda CR-X SI | 46.7 | 18 | Super Touring Under |
| 2021 | October 3 | (United States) Jesse Prather | Kansas | 1999 BMW Z3 | 41.5 | 16 | E Production |
| 2021 | October 3 | (Netherlands) Sven de Vries | Saginaw Valley | Novakar J9 Suzuki | 46.7 | 18 | Formula 500 |
| 2021 | October 3 | (United States) Vaughn Glace | Steel Cities | USF 2000 Mazda MZR | 49.2 | 19 | Formula X |
| 2021 | October 3 | (United States) Thomas Herb | Chicago | Porsche 991.2 GT3 Cup | 46.7 | 18 | GT-1 |
| 2021 | October 3 | (United States) Troy Ermish | San Francisco | Nissan 350Z | 49.2 | 19 | GT-3 |
| 2021 | October 3 | (United States) Bobby Sak | Detroit | SCCA Spec Racer Ford Gen3 | 49.2 | 19 | Spec Racer Ford Gen3 |
| 2021 | October 3 | (United States) Andrew Aquilante | Philadelphia | 2014 Ford Mustang | 49.2 | 19 | Touring 1 |
| 2021 | October 3 | (United States) Marshall Mast | Philadelphia | 2019 Ford Mustang EcoBoost | 49.2 | 19 | Touring 3 |

=== Pennzoil 150 (2020–2023) ===
The Xfinity Series' Pennzoil 150 has been held on the track's infield road course after being moved from the oval in 2020.

=== Indianapolis 8 Hours (since 2020) ===
The Indianapolis 8 Hours is a GT class sports car endurance race held by the Intercontinental GT Challenge series, in conjunction with the GT World Challenge America series.

Note: The 2021 race was run on the 2.589 miles (4.167 km) layout used by the SCCA Runoffs, and not the 2.439 miles (3.925 km) layout as used by INDYCAR because of kerbing damage from the NASCAR meeting.

=== GT4 America Series (since 2020) ===
The GT4 America Series holds twin races, as support to the Indianapolis 8 Hours. After the 2020 season, the Sprint and SprintX classifications were abolished.

| Year | Date | Series | Winning drivers | Car | Elapsed distance | |
| Year | Date | Series | Winning drivers | Car | Miles | Laps |
|---|---|---|---|---|---|---|
| 2020 | Oct 4 | Sprint | (United States) Drew Staveley | Ford Mustang GT4 | 78.0 | 32 |
| 2020 | Oct 4 | SprintX | (United States) Charlie Belluardo (Belgium) Jan Heylen | Porsche 718 Cayman GT4 | 85.4 | 35 |
| 2020 | Oct 4 | SprintX | (United States) Michael Dinan (United States) Robby Foley | Aston Martin V8 Vantage GT4 | 87.8 | 36 |
| 2020 | Oct 4 | Sprint | (United States) Drew Staveley | Ford Mustang GT4 | 80.5 | 33 |
| 2021 | Oct 14 | | (United States) Colin Mullan (United States) Michai Stephens | Mercedes-AMG GT4 | 78.0 | 32 |
| 2021 | Oct 15 | | (United States) Colin Mullan (United States) Michai Stephens | Mercedes-AMG GT4 | 78.0 | 32 |
| 2022 | Oct 8 | | (United States) Elias Sabo (United States) Andy Lee | Aston Martin V8 Vantage GT4 | 80.5 | 33 |
| 2022 | Oct 9 | | (United Kingdom) Stevan McAleer (United States) Eric Filgueiras | Porsche 718 Cayman GT4 Clubsport | 85.4 | 35 |

=== TC America Series (since 2020) ===
The TC America Series holds twin races, as support to the Indianapolis 8 Hours.

| Year | Date | Winning driver | Car | Elapsed distance | |
| Year | Date | Winning driver | Car | Miles | Laps |
|---|---|---|---|---|---|
| 2020 | Oct 2 | (United States) Tristan Herbert | Audi RS3 LMS TCR (DSG) | 53.7 | 22 |
| 2020 | Oct 3 | (Puerto Rico) Victor Gonzalez Jr. | Honda Civic Type R TCR (FK8) | 63.4 | 26 |
| 2021 | Oct 15 | (United States) Jacob Ruud | BMW M2 ClubSport Racing | 48.8 | 20 |
| 2021 | Oct 16 | (United States) Jacob Ruud | BMW M2 ClubSport Racing | 48.8 | 20 |
| 2022 | Oct 7 | (United States) Colin Garrett | BMW M2 ClubSport Racing | 56.1 | 23 |
| 2022 | Oct 9 | (United States) Colin Garrett | BMW M2 ClubSport Racing | 56.1 | 23 |

=== Verizon 200 at the Brickyard (2021–2023) ===
The NASCAR Cup Series Verizon 200 at the Brickyard has been held annually on track's infield road course after being moved from the oval in 2021, creating a three-race weekend on the road course.

=== GT America Series (since 2021) ===
The GT America Series holds twin races, as support to the Indianapolis 8 Hours.

| Year | Date | Winning driver | Car | Elapsed distance | |
| Year | Date | Winning driver | Car | Miles | Laps |
|---|---|---|---|---|---|
| 2021 | Oct 17 | (United States) Brendan Iribe | McLaren 570S GT4 | 58.5 | 24 |
| 2021 | Oct 17 | (United States) Brendan Iribe | McLaren 570S GT4 | 61.0 | 25 |
| 2022 | Oct 7 | (United States) George Kurtz | Mercedes-AMG GT3 Evo | 65.9 | 27 |
| 2022 | Oct 9 | (United States) George Kurtz | Mercedes-AMG GT3 Evo | 68.3 | 28 |

=== Porsche Sprint Challenge North America (2021–2023) ===
The Porsche Sprint Challenge North America held twin races, as support to the Porsche Carrera Cup North America. All participating cars: Porsche.

| Year | Date | Winning driver | Elapsed distance | |
| Year | Date | Winning driver | Miles | Laps |
|---|---|---|---|---|
| 2021 | Oct 15 | (United States) Michael McCarthy | 52.0 | 20 |
| 2021 | Oct 16 | (United States) Michael McCarthy | 49.4 | 19 |
| 2022 | Sep 3 | (United Kingdom) Dan Clarke | 59.8 | 23 |
| 2022 | Sep 4 | (Puerto Rico) Sebastian Carazo | 59.8 | 23 |

=== Formula Regional Americas Championship (2024) ===
The Formula Regional Americas Championship held triple races as support to Sportscar Vintage Racing Association sanctioned racing. All participating cars: Ligier JS F3

| Year | Date | Winning driver | Race distance | |
| Year | Date | Winning driver | Miles | Laps |
|---|---|---|---|---|
| 2024 | June 15 | (Canada) Patrick Woods-Toth | 51.22 | 21 |
| 2024 | June 16 | (United States) Ryan Shehan | 43.90 | 18 |
| 2024 | June 16 | (Canada) Patrick Woods-Toth | 26.83 | 11 |

== Dirt track ==
=== Bryan Clauson Classic (2018–2019, 2021–present) ===
In 2018, the Speedway added a 0.200 mile dirt track near Turn 3. It hosts an annual United States Auto Club-sanctioned midget invitational event, the Bryan Clauson Classic, featuring two races, the Stoops Pursuit and the Driven2SaveLives BC39.

The Stoops Pursuit is a 25-lap elimination race split into five stages of five green flag laps each. Eliminations occur when a car stops and causes a safety car at any time, and at the end of each stage, any car that lost track position or the last place driver. The winner earns $1,500 plus an extra $100 for each position gained.

The Driven2SaveLives BC39 is a 39-lap race, with a winner's prize of $20,039. The starting field is based on heat race results and passing points.

| Year | Date | Race name | Winning driver | Race distance | |
| Year | Date | Race name | Winning driver | Miles | Laps |
|---|---|---|---|---|---|
| 2018 | September 5 | Stoops Pursuit | (United States) Zeb Wise | 5 | 25 |
| 2018 | September 6–7 | Driven2SaveLives BC39 | (United States) Brady Bacon | 7.8 | 39 |
| 2019 | September 4 | Stoops Pursuit | (United States) Kyle Larson | 4.8 | 24 |
| 2019 | September 5 | Driven2SaveLives BC39 | (United States) Zeb Wise | 7.8 | 39 |
| 2021 | August 18 | Stoops Pursuit | (United States) Kyle Larson | 5 | 25 |
| 2021 | August 19 | Driven2SaveLives BC39 | (United States) Kyle Larson | 7.8 | 39 |
| 2022 | August 3 | Stoops Pursuit | (United States) Dominic Gorden | 5 | 25 |
| 2022 | August 4 | Driven2SaveLives BC39 | (United States) Buddy Kofoid | 7.8 | 39 |

Note: The 2019 Stoops Pursuit was scored as of 24 laps because the red flag waved on the final lap and two cars were stalled after collisions, leaving just one car running at the end of the event.

== Other automotive exhibitions ==
=== Brick track re-opening (1909) ===
After the original track surface of crushed stone and tar proved unsuitable, during the August 1909 races, the decision was made to re-pave the track with brick. Once that was completed, and a retaining wall added, a two-day time trial session was conducted. Ten drivers and riders drove partial laps alone, attempting speed records at various distances of one mile and less. In addition, there was one 20-mile free-for-all session, with seven cars running concurrently. Finally, Lewis Strang drove a two-lap session. Although no races were held, or planned, the public was admitted, and programs were sold.

| Year | Date | | Driver / rider | Car / motorcycle | Time | Speed |
|---|---|---|---|---|---|---|
| 1909 | Dec 17 | Fastest mile - automobile | (United States) Lewis Strang | Fiat | 00:40.61 | 88.648 mph |
| 1909 | Dec 17 | Fastest mile - motorcycle | (United States) Fred Huyck | Indian | 00:52.60 | 68.441 mph |
| 1909 | Dec 17 | Fast time - 20-mile session | (United States) Johnny Aitken | National | 16:18.41 | 73.589 mph |
| 1909 | Dec 18 | Fastest mile - automobile | (United States) Lewis Strang | Fiat | 00:39.21 | 91.813 mph |
| 1909 | Dec 18 | Five-mile session | (United States) Lewis Strang | Fiat | 03:17.70 | 91.047 mph |

=== Indianapolis Auto Show Stunt Driving Competition (1910) ===
Several weeks before its first auto races of 1910, the Speedway held a special competition, in conjunction with the Indianapolis Auto Show. Six stunts were attempted while driving, including popping balloons with the wheels, and balancing the car on a teeter board. Most of the stunts required the participation of a passenger, such as dropping a potato into a basket, and holding a rubber ball in a spoon. At least two of the participants were professional race drivers (Harry Endicott and Johnny Aitken). The winner apparently was not, as his name does not appear in available race statistics of the day. The drivers in this event also included Katrina Fertig, making her the first woman to drive in a competition (though not in a race, as such) at the Indianapolis Motor Speedway.

| Year | Date | Winning driver | Car |
|---|---|---|---|
| 1910 | March 31 | Bert Bronson | Austin |

=== Hazard Race (1910) ===
The second day of the May, 1910, race weekend started with a special event, a "Hazard Race." Each car went out separately, driving over portable ramps on the track, into the creek in the infield, under the track, into the parking lot, across the automobile bridge over the track, and eventually back onto the track. The total distance was a bit over a lap, and the winner was determined by the best time.

| Year | Date | Winning driver | Car | Time |
|---|---|---|---|---|
| 1910 | May 28 | Myers (first name not known) | Overland | 03:28.00 |

=== Private race: Union Printers' National Baseball League (1916) ===
In August 1916, the Union Printers' National Baseball League held its annual tournament in Indianapolis. A special event for the entertainment of tournament participants was a day of exhibition automobile races held at the Indianapolis Motor Speedway Because the races were not part of a recognized series, and were conducted for a private audience, this is not generally regarded as an official race event.

| Year | Date | Race | Winning driver | Car | Race distance | |
| Year | Date | Race | Winning driver | Car | Miles | Laps |
|---|---|---|---|---|---|---|
| 1916 | Aug 9 | 1 | (United States) Johnny Aitken | Peugeot | 25 | 10 |
| 1916 | Aug 9 | 2 | (United States) Johnny Aitken | Peugeot | 5 | 2 |

=== Private race: American Society for Steel Treating Convention (1921) ===
In September 1921, the American Society for Steel Treating held its annual convention in Indianapolis. A special event during this convention was an exhibition automobile race held at the Indianapolis Motor Speedway Because this race was not part of a recognized series, and was for a private audience, it is not generally regarded as an official race event.

| Year | Date | Winning driver | Car | Race distance | |
| Year | Date | Winning driver | Car | Miles | Laps |
|---|---|---|---|---|---|
| 1921 | Sep 21 | (United States) Howdy Wilcox | Frontenac | 50 | 20 |

=== Stevens Challenge Trophy (1927–1953) ===
Beginning in 1927, The Samuel B. Stevens Challenge Trophy was offered to any automobile manufacturer to run a strictly stock, production automobile at the Indianapolis Motor Speedway, for a period of 24 hours at an average speed of 60 miles per hour or more. This was not a race as such, as only one team participated in any instance. Four manufactures earned the trophy over the next 27 years. The trophy was retired after Chrysler's win in 1954.

Ford made an unsuccessful run 1956 with drivers Johnny Mantz, Chuck Stevenson, Chuck Davis, and Danny Ames. Though they failed to complete the 24 hours, they did set a 500-mile stock car record at the Speedway of 111.916 mph.

| Year | Date | Participating drivers | Car | Distance covered in 24 hours | Speed | Notes |
|---|---|---|---|---|---|---|
| 1927 | April 21–22 | John Jenkins; Charlie Merz | Stutz sedan | 1624.58 miles | 68.44 mph | Won trophy |
| 1927 | April 21–22 | Bruce Keen; Harold Fisher | Stutz Weymann | 1612.236 miles | 67.176 mph | |
| 1927 | April 21–22 | Gil Andersen; Tom Rooney; Lora L. Corum | Stutz Blackhawk | 1712.456 miles | N/A | Not eligible for trophy (non-stock vehicle) |
| 1931 | October 14–15 | Marmon test drivers^{[a]} | Marmon 16 | 1,834.215 miles | 76.425 mph | Won trophy |
| 1931 | October 14–15 | Marmon test drivers^{[a]} | Marmon 16 | 1,801.783 miles | 75.070 mph | Won trophy |
| 1937 | June 21–22 | (United States) Ab Jenkins (United States) Billy Winn | Cord | 1,909.851 miles | 79.577 mph | Won trophy |
| 1953 | October 29–30 | (United States) Tony Bettenhausen (United States) Pat O'Connor (United States) Bill Taylor | Chrysler | 2,157.5 miles | 89.89 mph | Won trophy |
Notes:
| [a] | The trophy does not indicate the drivers involved. According to newspaper articles, the drivers were test drivers from the Marmon factory. | | | | | |

=== Nichels Engineering Endurance Run (1961) ===
In 1961, Ray Nichels, then a successful builder of race cars, prepared two production-based Pontiacs for a 24-hour endurance run at the Indianapolis Motor Speedway. He assembled six drivers, three from USAC and three from NASCAR, taking turns in both cars.

| Year | Date | Participating drivers | Car | Distance covered in 24 hours | Speed |
|---|---|---|---|---|---|
| 1961 | November 20–21 | (United States) Paul Goldsmith (United States) Marvin Panch (United States) Fireball Roberts (United States) Len Sutton (United States) Rodger Ward (United States) Joe Weatherly | Pontiac Catalina | 2,576.241 miles | 107.343 mph |
| 1961 | November 20–21 | (United States) Paul Goldsmith (United States) Marvin Panch (United States) Fireball Roberts (United States) Len Sutton (United States) Rodger Ward (United States) Joe Weatherly | Pontiac Enforcer | 2,586.878 miles | 107.787 mph |

=== Stadium Super Trucks (2014) ===
In 2014, the Stadium Super Trucks, officially known as Speed Energy Formula Off-Road, held a doubleheader event on a small modified course at the northwest corner of the track. This incorporated a portion of the oval track's pit entry, two small portions of the road course, a segment of an access lane, and dirt areas in between, with two jump ramps added. This occurred during the Indy 500's Carb Day activities, and marked the first time in track history that trucks were raced. Series founder Robby Gordon had tested at the track in April.

| Year | Date | Race name | Race | Winning driver | Laps |
|---|---|---|---|---|---|
| 2014 | May 23 | Menards at the Brickyard | 1 | (United States) Robby Gordon | 16 |
| 2014 | May 23 | Menards at the Brickyard | 2 | (Mexico) Apdaly Lopez | 16 |

=== Indy Autonomous Challenge (2021) ===
In 2021, a race to determine the winner of the Indy Autonomous Challenge was held on the oval using full-scale autonomous race cars based on identical Dallara Indy Lights chassis supplied by Juncos Racing. The event was composed exclusively of teams from academic institutions, which were required to develop their own self-driving software.

| Year | Date | Winning team | University | Race distance | |
| Year | Date | Winning team | University | Miles | Laps |
|---|---|---|---|---|---|
| 2021 | Oct 23 | TUM Autonomous Motorsport | (Germany) Technical University of Munich | 50 | 20 |
