= Indianapolis 500 by year =

Motor race history

This article discusses the year-by-year history of the Indianapolis 500 race.

== Years ==
=== 1909–1910 ===
The first motorcycle and automobile races and demonstration runs are held the Indianapolis Motor Speedway in August 1909. After a series of accidents, the original surface of crushed stone and tar is deemed unsuitable for racing. In the fall of 1909, the entire track is paved in brick, immediately giving the track the nickname "The Brickyard." An exhibition meet is held in December 1909, and racing meets are held throughout the summer of 1910.

See Indianapolis Motor Speedway race results

=== 1911–1919 ===
1911: A historic event in the history of American automobile racing. After two years hosting multiple race meets, the Speedway management decided from 1911 onward to conduct one major racing event per year. With the then-fantastic marathon distance of 500 miles, and a substantial purse, 40 cars qualify. Ray Harroun, an engineer for the Marmon Co. receives the checkered flag at an average speed of just over 74 mph. The inaugural "International 500-Mile Sweepstakes" is a rousing success, and becomes an annual Memorial Day tradition, and eventually grows to become one of the most important automobile races in the world.

1912: Ralph DePalma's Mercedes breaks its connecting rod after leading 196 laps. Joe Dawson, in a National, wins after leading the only 2 laps of his Indy career. No driver has ever matched DePalma's 196 fruitless laps in the lead, (only not being in the lead for the first two and the last two laps) and only Billy Arnold's 198 lap domination of the 1930 race tops DePalma's time at the front; Dawson's 2 laps led by a winner would be the fewest recorded by a winner until 2011.

1913: A five-story, wooden pagoda-style timing and scoring tower on the inside of the main straightaway gives the Speedway an enduring landmark; the style reflects Speedway President Carl Fisher's apparent interest in Oriental architecture. French born Jules Goux drinks six bottles of champagne on his way to a record 13-minute, 8-second victory over second place Spencer Wishart. He averages approximately 10 miles per gallon of fuel – and an unknown quantity of champagne per stop. Goux's victory is the first race, excluding the first, won by a rookie driver.

1914: France takes its second consecutive 500 victory, this time with René Thomas, the first occasion for consecutive rookie winners. Also, in a technological breakthrough, inaugural race winner Ray Harroun, in charge of the United States Motor Company team, develops a fuel-sipping carburetor that runs on kerosene. Driver Willie Carlson's Maxwell chassis proceeds to run the race to an eventual ninth-place finish on a mere 30 gallons; with the price at $0.06 a gallon, Carlson's total $1.80 fuel bill stands as the most economical performance in motor racing history.

1915: Ralph DePalma's Mercedes again begins to slow with connecting rod problems late in the race. This time though he makes it to the finish to win.

1916: Dario Resta wins the race, which was shortened to 300 miles (500 km) due to the ongoing war in Europe. The field of 21 cars is the smallest ever. Later in the year, the Harvest Auto Racing Classic is also held.

1917–1918: Race is not held on account of World War I. Other tracks continue to host smaller events, but Indianapolis voluntarily suspends the race. Though closed to racing, the Speedway is used as an airstrip, serving as a fuel stop between Air Force bases in Dayton, Ohio and Rantoul, Illinois.

1919: With the track reopened after the war, local Indiana-born driver Howdy Wilcox wins the race. There are 19 rookies who start this year's race, the most newcomers in one Indy 500 field (if one discounts the "all-rookie" field of 1911).

=== 1920–1929 ===
1920: Ralph DePalma suffers another heartbreaking mishap when his magneto fails with 14 laps to go while leading. Gaston Chevrolet takes over the lead and goes on to win. Six months later, Chevrolet is fatally injured in a race at Beverly Hills. He becomes the first '500' winner to die.

1921: Tommy Milton, Gaston Chevrolet's replacement on the Frontenac team, drives through the field from 20th starting position to win his first '500'. Ralph DePalma again dominates the first half of the race, only to suffer mechanical failure. DePalma's career record total of 612 laps led will stand for the next 66 years.

1922: Jimmy Murphy is the first driver to win the race from the pole position.

1923: Despite suffering loss of circulation and blistering in his hands due to shrinkage of his tight-fitting, 'White Kid' gloves, Tommy Milton becomes the first driver to win the race twice (Milton was relieved by Howdy Wilcox for laps 103–151).

1924: Lora L. Corum's car is taken over by Joe Boyer, who goes on to win. Corum wins without leading a single lap in his racing career at Indianapolis, the first driver to do so.

1925: The race is won by Ralph DePalma's nephew, and former riding mechanic, Peter DePaolo. Depaolo was the first to average over 100 mph (160 km/h) on his way to victory. The race was part of the 1925 World Manufacturers' Championship.

1926: Twenty-three-year-old racing sensation Frank Lockhart wins the race as a rookie. He is the first winner born in the 20th century. Rain hampered the race, and it was called at the 400-mile mark. The race was part of the 1926 World Manufacturers' Championship.

1927: Rookie George Souders wins by eight laps, the largest margin since 1913; consecutive rookie winners occurs for the second time. Many racing pundits view Souders' race as the most surprising, 'longest-shot' 500-Mile Race win in history until 1987. Souders becomes the first driver to win the full-500-mile race solo, with neither any relief help, nor a riding mechanic. The race was part of the 1927 World Manufacturers' Championship.

1928: Jimmy Gleason has a good lead when he stops for water for the radiator on lap 195. A crew member misses the radiator and douses the car's magneto. Gleason is out and Louis Meyer wins. The race was part of the 1928 World Manufacturers' Championship.

1929: Louis Meyer stalls on his final pitstop, handing the race to Ray Keech, who is killed in a racing crash just two weeks after the '500'.

=== 1930–1939 ===
1930: Billy Arnold takes the lead on lap three and is never challenged again. Arnold's 198 laps led in a race has never been bettered.

1931: 1930 winner Billy Arnold is 5 laps ahead on lap 162 when his rear axle breaks and Arnold crashes. His wheel flies over a fence and hits and kills 12-year-old Wilbur C. Brink, who is sitting in his garden on Georgetown Road. Arnold and his mechanic are injured. Louis Schneider leads the remaining laps.

1932: Fred Frame wins the race from 27th starting position, and is the eighth different leader of the race, a record at the time.

1933: The largest field to date with 42 starters. Louis Meyer wins after one of the most violent races ever, with five drivers or mechanics killed and several others seriously injured. The standard Victory Banquet after the race is not held, and the predominance of safety as chief concern for race organizers begins 'in force'. Prior to the 1933 race, Howdy Wilcox II (no relation to the 1919 winner) was disqualified when officials found out that he was a diabetic.

1934: Bill Cummings wins by 27 seconds from Mauri Rose, the closest ever finish at the time.

1935: The newly introduced yellow 'caution' light, requiring drivers to slow and hold position, makes its first appearance in race, to eventual race winner Kelly Petillo's advantage as many of the late laps are disrupted by rain, neutralising Petillo's race long battle with Rex Mays and Wilbur Shaw.

1936: Louis Meyer becomes the first driver to win a third time, drink milk (in actuality buttermilk) in Victory Lane, receive the Borg-Warner Trophy, and also receive the pace car as one of his prizes.

1937: Wilbur Shaw leads most of the way but must slow late on to conserve engine oil. Ralph Hepburn catches Shaw in turn 4 on the final lap, but Shaw steps on the gas and pulls away to win by 2.16 seconds – the closest finish at that time.

1938: Floyd Roberts, driving the ill-fated Burd Piston Ring Special, dominates to win by three laps.

1939: Defending winner Floyd Roberts, driving the same car he drove into victory circle in 1938, dies in a crash coming off the second turn onto the backstretch on lap 107. Wilbur Shaw wins his second 500, driving a Maserati. Interesting fact: The Maserati used by Wilbur Shaw was also used by Bill Vukovich to accomplish his rookie test at the Indianapolis Motor Speedway. George Bailey became the first driver to compete with a rear-engined car in the Indianapolis 500 when he contested the 1939 race in a Gulf-Miller.

=== 1940–1949 ===
1940: Wilbur Shaw becomes the second three-time winner and the first to win two in a row in the same Maserati he drove to victory the previous year. The last quarter of the distance is run under the caution flag due to rain.

1941: A fire on race morning destroys part of the garage area and one of the qualified cars. The start is delayed by one hour because of the fire. Wilbur Shaw dominates again, but on lap 152, a wheel collapses, sending Shaw's car into the first turn wall. The wheel is believed to have been one Shaw identified before the race as faulty, and had marked it as not to be used. Water from the hoses battling the garage fire apparently washed off the markings and the wheel was put on during the last pit stop. Mauri Rose, whose pole-winning Maserati dropped out early, took over teammate Floyd Davis's car on lap 72 and drove up through the pack to win. This was the second and last time to date that there were co-winners.

1942–1945: The Speedway is shut down for the duration of World War II—almost. Sometime in late autumn of 1944, Wilbur Shaw participates in a special tire test for Firestone at the track. He is dismayed by the condition of the facility, and, after talking to track owner Eddie Rickenbacker, sets out single-handedly to find a buyer to rejuvenate the speedway. On November 14, 1945, Tony Hulman purchases the track and begins a six-month crash renovation program to revive the 500-mile race in 1946.

1946: The first post-war '500' is a box-office smash, with massive traffic jams of spectators still entering the gates long after the race starts. Most of the race cars show the effects of sitting unused for almost five years, and mechanical attrition is extremely heavy. George Robson, driving a nine-year-old Thorne Engineering Special Sparks, survives the attrition to win by 44 seconds over rookie Jimmy Jackson.

1947: Mauri Rose and rookie teammate Bill Holland dominate the race in their twin Blue Crown Spark Plug Specials. Holland, who is well ahead in the late stages, obeys a pit signal to slow down and preserve the car for the finish. Rose gets the same signal, but continues to charge ahead and overtakes Holland with seven laps to go. Rose goes on to win, to the dismay of Holland, who thought he had been a lap ahead. A pre-race dispute between track management and a drivers association results in only 30 cars lining up on race day, instead of the usual 33.

1948: Rose and Holland repeat their one-two performance of the previous year, this time without the controversy. Ted Horn finishes fourth in Wilbur Shaw's old Maserati, completing a run of nine consecutive races in which he is fourth or better, although he never wins.

1949: After pole-sitter Duke Nalon crashes out spectacularly in the Novi, the race settles down to a repeat of 1947, only this time Bill Holland won't be caught napping. Mauri Rose tries to catch him anyway, but a broken magneto strap takes him out of second place with eight laps remaining. Holland cruises home the winner. It's the last victory for a front-wheel drive car at Indianapolis.

=== 1950–1959 ===
1950: The Indianapolis 500 was part of the Formula 1 World Championship calendar from 1950 to 1960. A rumor circulated at race morning, that Johnnie Parsons' engine had an irreparable crack. During the race, his hard charging performance sees him leading, and picking up lap leader prizes. At 345 miles (555 km) the rain comes, and Parsons is declared the winner as the race is called at lap 138. Clark Gable and Barbara Stanwyck film scenes from the movie To Please a Lady during the race.

1951: Four days after winning the 500 (and becoming the first to do so in less than four hours) Lee Wallard is severely burned in a sprint car race and lives the rest of his life unable to perspire properly and without the strength to drive a car.

1952: Bill Vukovich leads 150 laps until his steering pin breaks on lap 192. He stopped the car by brushing it against the outside wall, a move which prevented other cars from becoming involved in the sudden incident. Twenty-two-year-old Troy Ruttman takes the checkered flag, the youngest-ever winner. On the pole for the '52 race was Fred Agabashian's Diesel-powered racer that succumbed to supercharger trouble on lap 71.

1953: On one of the hottest days on record for the running of the 500, Bill Vukovich leads 195 laps and cruises to a win by nearly three laps over 1952 rookie of the year Art Cross. Vukovich wins without relief help in a race that sees one entry being driven by as many as five separate drivers, and suffers the death of driver Carl Scarborough due to heat prostration.

1954: Picking up where he left off, Bill Vukovich wins again by one lap over Jimmy Bryan, after taking the lead for the final time just past the halfway point. Incredibly, for the second straight year one entry on race day is driven by five separate drivers, in temperatures only just below the previous year's record.

1955: After two wins and 485 laps led of a possible 656 (74%), Bill Vukovich is killed on lap 57 after crashing out of the lead. Rodger Ward broke a rear axle and a back marker tangled with him in front of Vukovich, whose car hits them and vaults over the backstretch wall into a car park. Bob Sweikert wins after Art Cross blows his engine on lap 169 and Don Freeland loses drive on lap 179. Sweikert dies in a sprint car race a year later. Interesting fact: Sweikert built the Offenhauser engine that brought him the victory, while his car owner (AJ Watson) was at his wife's bedside while she was in labor.

1956: AAA drops out of sanctioning racing after the 1955 Vukovich crash and public outcry that briefly followed, and the tragedy at Le Mans that same year, so USAC is formed to sanction Indianapolis style racing. Torrential rains flood the facility the week of the race and threaten to postpone, or outright cancel the race. Track superintendent Clarence Cagle pulls off what becomes known as "Cagle's miracle" and has the track cleaned up in time for race morning. Pat Flaherty wins.

1957: After thirteen years of trying, Sam Hanks finally wins the 500, and then, amidst tears, becomes the second winner, after Ray Harroun in 1911, to announce his retirement in victory lane. Hanks' win comes in a radical "lay-down" roadster chassis design created by engineer George Salih that, with the engine tilting 72-degrees to the right, gives the car a profile of a mere 21 inches (530 mm) off the ground. Salih builds the car next to his California home, and is rewarded with victory as both designer and owner after stepping out on a financial limb in entering the car himself.

1958: A huge wreck in turn three on the opening lap wipes out several cars, and driver Pat O'Connor is fatally injured. Jimmy Bryan goes on to win in the same car Sam Hanks drove to victory the previous year. Little-known rookie A. J. Foyt spins out and finishes 16th.

1959: A record sixteen cars finish the entire 500 miles (800 km) as Rodger Ward holds off Jim Rathmann for the win.

=== 1960–1969 ===
1960: Jim Rathmann and Rodger Ward resume their duel from last year, trading the lead fourteen times in the last 200 miles. After three-second-place finishes, Rathmann finally prevails when Ward has to slow down to save his tires with three laps to go. There are 29 lead changes in all, a record that will stand for over 50 years. Rookie Jim Hurtubise shatters the track record in qualifying at over 149 miles per hour, coming within 16/100ths of a second of turning the first 150 mph lap at the Speedway.

1961: The Golden Anniversary of the first '500' starts with 82-year-old Ray Harroun taking a parade lap in his winning Marmon Wasp of 1911. After several different drivers, including newcomer Parnelli Jones, take turns leading, the race comes down a battle between A. J. Foyt and Eddie Sachs, which goes to Foyt when Sachs pits for a right rear tire with only three laps to go. Formula 1 champion Jack Brabham finishes ninth in a rear-engine Cooper-Climax, a prelude of things to come.

1962: Parnelli Jones breaks the 150 mph barrier to win the pole, and dominates the first 300 miles on race day. However, his brakes fail and he has to slow down. Rodger Ward takes over the lead and wins his second '500' by 11 seconds over teammate Len Sutton.

1963: Parnelli Jones finishes the job he started last year, leading 167 of the 200 laps to win in his front-engine roadster "Old Calhoun", in spite of a late-race oil leak which almost gets him the black flag. Formula 1 champion-to-be Jim Clark comes in second in a rear-engine Lotus-Ford, heralding the British Invasion of the 500 and Indy-car racing in general.

1964: Rear-engine, Ford-powered cars sweep the front row, with Jim Clark raising the track record by over seven miles an hour. Tragedy strikes on Lap 2 when Dave MacDonald hits the wall coming out of Turn 4 and his car explodes in a huge fireball. Eddie Sachs and several others pile into the accident, which stops the race for nearly two hours. Both MacDonald and Sachs are killed. When the race resumes, the fast but fragile rear-engine cars fall apart, leaving A. J. Foyt to pick up the pieces, as he becomes a two-time winner. Foyt's roadster is the last front-engine machine to win the Indianapolis 500.

1965: Scotland's Jim Clark leads 190 of 200 laps to become the first non-American winner since 1916. His Lotus-Ford is the first rear-engine winning car, and the first to average more than 150 miles per hour for the entire distance (150.686), just three years after the first single lap was turned at 150. Parnelli Jones finishes second and rookie Mario Andretti is third.

1966: A huge pile-up at the start takes out 11 cars, including those of A. J. Foyt and Dan Gurney, but, thankfully, there are no serious injuries. Only seven cars are left running in the end, with Graham Hill edging out Jim Clark by 41 seconds in a Battle of Britains. Some people think there was a scoring error and that Clark had actually won, but Clark's team does not protest.

1967: Andy Granatelli and his brothers bring a radical new turbine-powered car to the Speedway this year. Parnelli Jones absolutely dominates the field in it, and leads by almost a lap when a bearing in the gearbox fails with just three and a half laps to go. A. J. Foyt weaves his way through a multi-car accident on the final straightaway to win his third '500'. The race is a two-day affair for the first time when rain postpones the event after only 18 laps on May 30. Shortly after the race, USAC officials change the rules regarding turbines to reduce the Granatellis' advantage.

1968: The Granatellis return with even more turbines this year, in new wedge-shaped Lotus chassis. They take the first two starting spots with record speeds of over 170 mph. However, on race day, Bobby Unser in a turbocharged Offenhauser-powered car, is able to take their measure, leading 127 laps. Unser's path to victory is cleared when Joe Leonard's turbine breaks its fuel pump shaft with just nine laps to go while leading. USAC then issues further restrictions on turbines, rendering any future such engines uncompetitive.

1969: Andy Granatelli abandons the turbines and joins forces with Mario Andretti in a new four-wheel drive Lotus with a turbocharged Ford engine. But after the car is destroyed in a practice crash, the team qualifies a conventional two-wheel drive Hawk built by crew chief Clint Brawner. For the only time in Andretti's Indy career, all the breaks finally go his way, as he wins by nearly two laps over Dan Gurney. The long-suffering Granatelli plants a kiss on Mario's cheek in Victory Lane.

=== 1970–1979 ===
1970 · 1971 · 1972 · 1973 · 1974 · 1975 · 1976 · 1977 · 1978 · 1979

=== 1980–1989 ===
1980 · 1981 · 1982 · 1983 · 1984 · 1985 · 1986 · 1987 · 1988 · 1989

=== 1990–1999 ===
1990 · 1991 · 1992 · 1993 · 1994 · 1995 · 1996 · 1997 · 1998 · 1999

=== 2000–2009 ===
2000 · 2001 · 2002 · 2003 · 2004 · 2005 · 2006 · 2007 · 2008 · 2009

=== 2010–2019 ===
2010 · 2011 · 2012 · 2013 · 2014 · 2015 · 2016 · 2017 · 2018 · 2019

=== 2020–2029 ===
2020 · 2021 · 2022 · 2023 · 2024 · 2025 · 2026

== Eras ==
During the over-century long history of the Indianapolis 500 and Indianapolis Motor Speedway, numerous recognized eras have been established by historians, media, competitors, and fans. As the race follows the infancy of the automobile through the 20th century, and into the 21st century, sharp increases in technology, car design, and speed, have generally shaped the eras, which loosely follow decade patterns. Organizational changes and disputes, varying levels of popularity, increased media coverage, world wars, personalities, participants, traditions, famous races, and tragedies, have all been defining factors to establish the boundaries of the respective eras.

=== Fisher era ===
From the opening of the track (1909) and the first 500 (1911), through 1927. Carl G. Fisher and partners envisioned a "proving ground" for the budding automobile industry. The very early years of the 500 saw the track in its original "proving ground" intent, but the competition soon became the primary focus. Numerous makes and models of local, national, and international car companies participated, with the cars more conforming to the original specifications of being essentially stripped-down passenger vehicles. Riding mechanics were the norm (with the noteworthy exception of Ray Harroun in 1911).

The AAA Contest Board sanctioned the events at the Speedway, and the race ultimately became part of a National Championship of drivers. The discipline of Championship Car racing became a national sport, with the Indianapolis 500 as its marquee event. A maximum 33-car field was established, based on a 1919 mandate by AAA officials that of 400 feet of track per car.

After World War I and during the Roaring Twenties, the formula quickly evolved into purpose-built racing machines. Small-block, supercharged 91 1/2 cu. in. (1.5 L) displacement engines were the standard. Riding mechanics were dropped, and the speeds quickly rose. Peter DePaolo became the first driver to average 100 mph for the 500 miles in 1925. Outside of Indianapolis, which was paved in brick, the 1920s was also the peak of popularity for board track racing. Fisher sold his interests in the track in late 1927.

=== Rickenbacker era ===
From 1928 to 1941. Eddie Rickenbacker purchased the Speedway in late-1927, and ushered in a new era. Sweeping changes would abound, as Rickenbacker was interested in bringing the Speedway back to its original "proving grounds" intent. Numerous rules changes were put into place, in an effort to lure back the passenger car manufacturers, and move away from the small-block, specialized/purpose-built racing machines that had taken over the sport in the 1920s. Such things as the reinstatement of riding mechanics, time trials expanded to ten-lap runs (up from four laps), banning supercharging, and increased engine displacement would have the machines more closely resemble cars available to the motoring public. In additional larger fields were allowed for a time, to as many as 42 cars (up from the traditional 33).

The Rickenbacker era coincided with the Great Depression, although the Speedway did not experience significant financial peril. Contrary to popular belief, the aforementioned rule changes were not made in response to the stock market crash of 1929, they were in fact being laid out as early as 1928, and were already approved by the AAA Contest Board in early January 1929.

Several Indy traditions were born during this time, including the first bottle of milk in victory lane, the first presentation of the Borg-Warner Trophy, and the tradition of presenting the race winner with the keys to the pace car. Rickenbacker also added an 18-hole golf course. The Rickenbacker Era is considered the deadliest period of "500" history, with 24 deaths among competitors and spectators. The deaths led slowly to rule changes and track safety improvements.

The first major national radio coverage of the race occurred in 1928. By 1939, Mutual Broadcasting System was covering the race live to various affiliates across the country. The era ended with the onset of the U.S. entry into World War II. Rickenbacker cancelled the 1942 race, shut the track down, and abandoned the facility, which fell into a state of neglect and disrepair.

=== Post-World War II / Hulman era ===
From 1946-early 1950s. Immediately after World War II, Tony Hulman bought the Speedway and swiftly renovated the track. It is a brief period, marked by a mix of mostly older cars. Auto racing began to rebuild as a sport after being banned during World War II, primarily due to rationing.

By this time, the typical pre-war image of race car drivers as daredevils or reckless stunt drivers had faded. Likewise the mechanics' image as "grease monkeys" or low-level tradesmen faded, as the sophistication of engines and chassis increased. Numerous drivers and mechanics during this time had been involved in the war effort, either stateside or abroad. Auto racing began to gain national recognition as a legitimate sport.

National radio coverage of the race began to grow quickly, first by Mutual, and later as a result of the formation of the Indianapolis Motor Speedway Radio Network.

Three generations of the Hulman/George family would own the Indianapolis Motor Speedway and preside over the Indianapolis 500 through 2019.

=== Roadster era ===
From 1952 to the mid-1960s. Considered by many as the "golden era" of the Indy 500, it is highlighted by the participation of the front-engined Roadsters. The first "roadster" is regarded to have been built and entered by Frank Kurtis in 1952. Legendary car builders A. J. Watson, George Salih, and Quin Epperly were notable constructors. Watson-built roadsters won the Indianapolis 500 in 1956, 1959, 1960, 1962, and 1964; and the 1961 and 1963 winners were closely resembled Watson-based designs.

During this time (1950–1960), the Indy 500 awarded points towards the World Championship of Drivers. However, very few European entries even made an attempt to race at Indy.

Noteworthy moments include the emotional victory by Sam Hanks in 1957, as well as the tragic death of two-time winner Bill Vukovich. The famous 1960 duel between Rodger Ward and Jim Rathmann set the race record for the most lead changes in Indy 500 history, a record that remarkably would not be broken until 2012. Indy legend A. J. Foyt debuted in 1958, and won his first 500 in 1961. In the fall of 1961, the last of the remaining original brick pavement was paved over in asphalt, and in 1962 Parnelli Jones famously broke the 150 mph barrier.

=== Rear-engine revolution ===
The 1960s. Sometimes referred to as the "British Invasion" or the "Decade of Innovation," it partly overlaps the aforementioned Roadster Era. In 1961, Jack Brabham arrived at Indy with a European, Grand Prix style, rear-engined machine. Against a field of venerable front-engined Offenhauser-powered roadsters, Brabham's car was considered diminutive and underpowered, however, it experienced exceptional handling in the relatively flat corners. The mechanical advantages of rear-engined cars were quickly realized, and rapidly began to displace their front-engined counterparts in the starting field. A. J. Foyt's win in 1964 was the last time a front-engine machine won the Indianapolis 500.

The late 1960s were highlighted by another series of innovative machines entered by prolific car owner Andy Granatelli. The STP-Paxton Turbocar (1967), followed by the Lotus "wedge" turbines (1968), both excelled at Indianapolis, but in both years, famously failed within sight of victory.

In 1965, ABC Sports carried the race for the first time on Wide World of Sports, ushering in a new era of television coverage at Indy. Jim Clark won the race in a rear-engine machine, the first of its type to do so. By the end of the decade, the movement toward rear engine cars had over taken the sport. In 1969 not a single front-engined car would qualify.

After a fiery fatal crash in 1964, USAC crafted rules to discourage, and eventually ban, the use of gasoline as a fuel.

=== Decade of legends ===
The 1970s. After bolt-on wings started being allowed in 1972, speeds quickly climbed. Drivers went from laps in the 160 mph range a few years earlier, to flirting with the elusive and daunting 200 mph barrier. Turbocharged engines were the powerplants of choice, downforce levels increased substantially, and wide slick tires were now being used. It was both an entertaining spectacle for the fans, as well as a disaster waiting to happen, as safety features were not prepared for the rapid increase in speeds. After a tragic race in 1973, sweeping changes were made starting in 1974, both to the cars and the track itself. Tom Sneva broke the elusive 200 mph barrier in 1977.

This era is also associated with the establishment of numerous Indy "legends." Drivers such as A. J. Foyt, Mario Andretti, Al Unser, Bobby Unser, Johnny Rutherford, Gordon Johncock, and many others, reached the peak of their respective careers during this period. Future "legends" Tom Sneva and Rick Mears also began their careers during this decade. While the decade was dominated by American drivers and American-based teams, success was not exclusive to just U.S.-based entries. McLaren was among the European entrants that experienced success, and towards the end of the decade, the venerable Offenhauser engine was now being seriously challenged by the British-built Cosworth.

A. J. Foyt became the first four-time winner of the 500, while Janet Guthrie became the first female to qualify for the race. The track itself gained notoriety for increasing attendance, television exposure, and the "Snakepit," a gathering place in the infield known for revelry.

=== CART era ===
From 1979 to 1995. After the formation of CART in 1979, the first open wheel "Split" came about and was the focus of the very early 1980s. After a few seasons of organizational disputes and various controversies, by 1983, a relative harmony in the sport settled, and saw the season of events sanctioned by CART, and the Indianapolis 500 itself sanctioned by USAC. The field of cars and drivers would be composed primarily of CART-based teams and various one-off ("Indy only") entries. The "500" would pay points towards the CART championship, though CART did not actually sanction the event.

The decade saw the concept of "customer chassis" take over the series, as well as exclusive engine leases creep into the competition. Nearly all engine and chassis manufacturers were foreign-based, to a point where by 1987, not a single chassis entered was built in the United States. Manufacturers such as March, Lola, and Reynard were the chassis of choice on the open market, with other more exclusive chassis (Penske and Galmer) also experiencing success.

This period also saw a sharp increase in the number of foreign-born competitors, going from as few as two, to as many as nineteen by 1995. While this was a booming period of increasing popularity both nationwide and worldwide, the dwindling number of American-born competitors was a point of contention for some fans and owners. In addition, the feeder series and "ladder" for arriving at Indy evolved from USAC sprints and midgets to predominantly formula-style road racing. Many of the top drivers on the circuit were now moving up from such disciplines as Can-Am, SCCA Super Vee, Atlantics, Indy Lights, and IMSA.

Rick Mears won the Indy 500 four times (1979, 1984, 1988, 1991) during the CART era, all for Penske Racing. The Penske team itself was one of the most successful teams during the era, winning nine races from 1979 to 1994. Al Unser Jr. became the first second-generation driver to win, while his father Al Unser Sr. won the race for the fourth time himself in 1987, in doing so, becoming the oldest driver to win. Speeds increased from just over 200 mph in the late 1970s, to over 230 mph by 1992. In 1986, Bobby Rahal became the first driver ever to complete the 500 miles in less than three hours, at an average speed of 170.722 mph.

Starting in 1986, ABC Sports began carrying the race live on network television. In addition, the radio network swelled to over 1,200 affiliates nationwide.

=== IRL / "Split" era ===
From 1996 to 2007. The IRL was formed in 1996, starting what was considered a "split" in the sport of Indy car racing. Speedway president Tony George founded the series with stated goals of implementing cost saving measures and to increase American driver participation. CART-based teams boycotted the race for four years, considering the move a "power grab" by George, and citing several organizational disagreements.

Popularity in the sport of Indy car racing and the Indy 500 saw a visible decline in attendance, television ratings, and positive media coverage. A new formula of normally-aspirated machines was introduced for 1997, and the "original" or "Old School IRL" era ran to roughly 2002. By 2003, most of the top CART-based teams and manufacturers had defected to the IRL, and likewise the landscape slowly receded back to resemble that of the CART era. Later, manufacturers began to pull out of the series, leaving Dallara and Honda as the only chassis and engine suppliers, respectively. A de facto "spec car" era began in 2006, but equipment shortages were not much of an issue going forward. Also in 2006, the series began experimenting with ethanol fuel blends.

A major event off the track during this era was the implementation of the MSA, which effectively ended tobacco sponsorship in the sport.

=== Unification era ===
In 2008, the Indy Racing League and Champ Car World Series completed an organizational unification, which marked the first time since 1978 that the sport of Indy car racing would be contested under a single sanctioning banner. The newly reorganized series would compete under the name IndyCar Series.

The seeds of unification and the end of the "split" began as early as 2000, when CART-based teams began crossing over to compete at the Indy 500 with the IRL regulars in one-off entries. The unified era can also be traced back more specifically to 2003, when most of the top CART-based teams and manufacturers defected to the IRL permanently and returned to the Indy 500 full-time.

The Unification Era spans specifically from either 2003 or 2008 through 2011. By the time of the formal 2008 unification, it was contested with the aforementioned "spec car", the Dallara IR03/05 powered by the normally aspirated Honda V-8 engines. With the sudden influx of former Champ Car teams and drivers, and an abundance of available rolling chassis, fields briefly grew. For a few years, bumping returned to time trials. The era was highlighted by the Centennial Era, culminating in the 100th Anniversary of the Indianapolis 500 in 2011.

The end of the IR-03/05 "spec" era came at the conclusion of the 2011 IndyCar season. It ended, however, tragically at Las Vegas.

=== Spec series era / Penske era ===
Since the 2012 IndyCar season, the series rolled out a new chassis and engine formula, bringing back turbocharged engines and multiple engine manufacturers. Honda, Chevrolet, and Lotus provided engines, though Lotus withdrew after only one season. The Dallara DW12 chassis was fitted with aero kits from Dallara from 2012 to 2014, then from Honda and Chevrolet respectively, from 2015 to 2017. A new universal Dallara aero kit has been used since 2018. Speeds began to climb again, surpassing the 230 mph barrier, but not breaking existing qualifying records that were set in 1996. The era was highlighted by the much-anticipated 100th Running of the Indianapolis 500 in 2016.

The era has been marked with an increase in competition on the track, with an all-time record of 68 lead changes set in 2013, and a record 15 different leaders in 2017. The 2014 race saw a 149-lap caution free stint from the start, and the 2013 and 2014 races are the two fastest Indy 500 races in history. In 2013, Tony Kanaan averaged 187.433 mph, the fastest 500 in history.

In late 2019, Tony George and the Hulman/George family sold the Indianapolis Motor Speedway, the IndyCar Series, and related holding to Roger Penske. Starting in 2020, the Speedway and the series was being run by Penske Entertainment. The 2020 race, like many sporting events that year, was postponed due to the COVID-19 pandemic. The race that season was held in August without spectators. In 2021, Helio Castroneves became the fourth four-time winner of the Indy 500, joining A. J. Foyt, Al Unser, and Rick Mears.
