= Hobart Buppert =

Hobart Buppert may refer to:

- Hobart Buppert, winner of a 7 June 2014 Brickyard Vintage Racing Invitational
- Hobart C. Buppert III, developer of the highly caffeinated soft drink Bawls
