= Eddie Bald =

American racing driver (1874–1946)

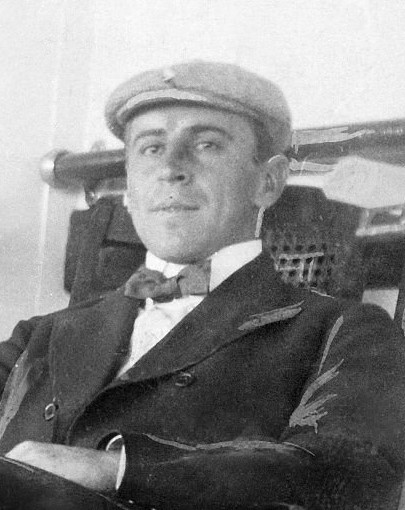
- Bald, circa 1902
- Born: Edward Carl Bald; January 27, 1874 Buffalo, New York, U.S.
- Died: July 1, 1946 (aged 72) Pittsburgh, Pennsylvania, U.S.

Edward Carl Bald (January 27, 1874 – July 1, 1946) was an American cyclist and automobile racing driver who was retroactively declared the 1907 AAA National Champion in 1951 by negationist sportswriter Russ Catlin. He was also a champion bicycle racer in the 1890s, nicknamed "The Cannon."

== Career ==
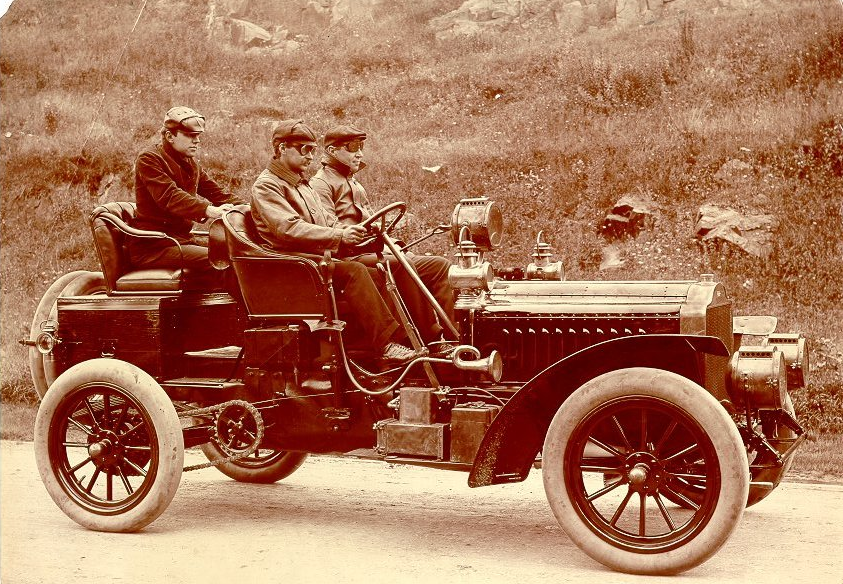
Bald (right) and Duffie after their record setting Chicago-to-New York run, October 1904

As a cyclist, Bald rode and promoted Columbia Bicycles. In 1904, Bald spent time at the Columbia factory learning about automobiles. Late that year, he was part of a motoring team which captured the Chicago-to-New York driving record. A time of 58 hours, 35 minutes was recorded in a Columbia car. Along with Bald were drivers Bert Holcomb (who was in charge of the run), Lawrence Duffie (Demonstrator of the Gasoline Dept of Electric Vehicle Company, which manufactured Columbia cars), Harry Sandol, and Ray Harroun. Bald went on to race Columbia cars for several years in both road and track events.

After his racing career, Bald worked as an auto salesman from 1909 until he retired in 1925.

== Personal life ==
Bald was born in Buffalo, New York, on January 27, 1874 and died in Pittsburgh on July 1, 1946, at the age of 72. Bald married Joan Seeley (born October 4, 1873) in 1909 and they had one son, Edward Jr., on August 11, 1912.
