= Remy Brassard and Grand Trophy Races =

American automobile races

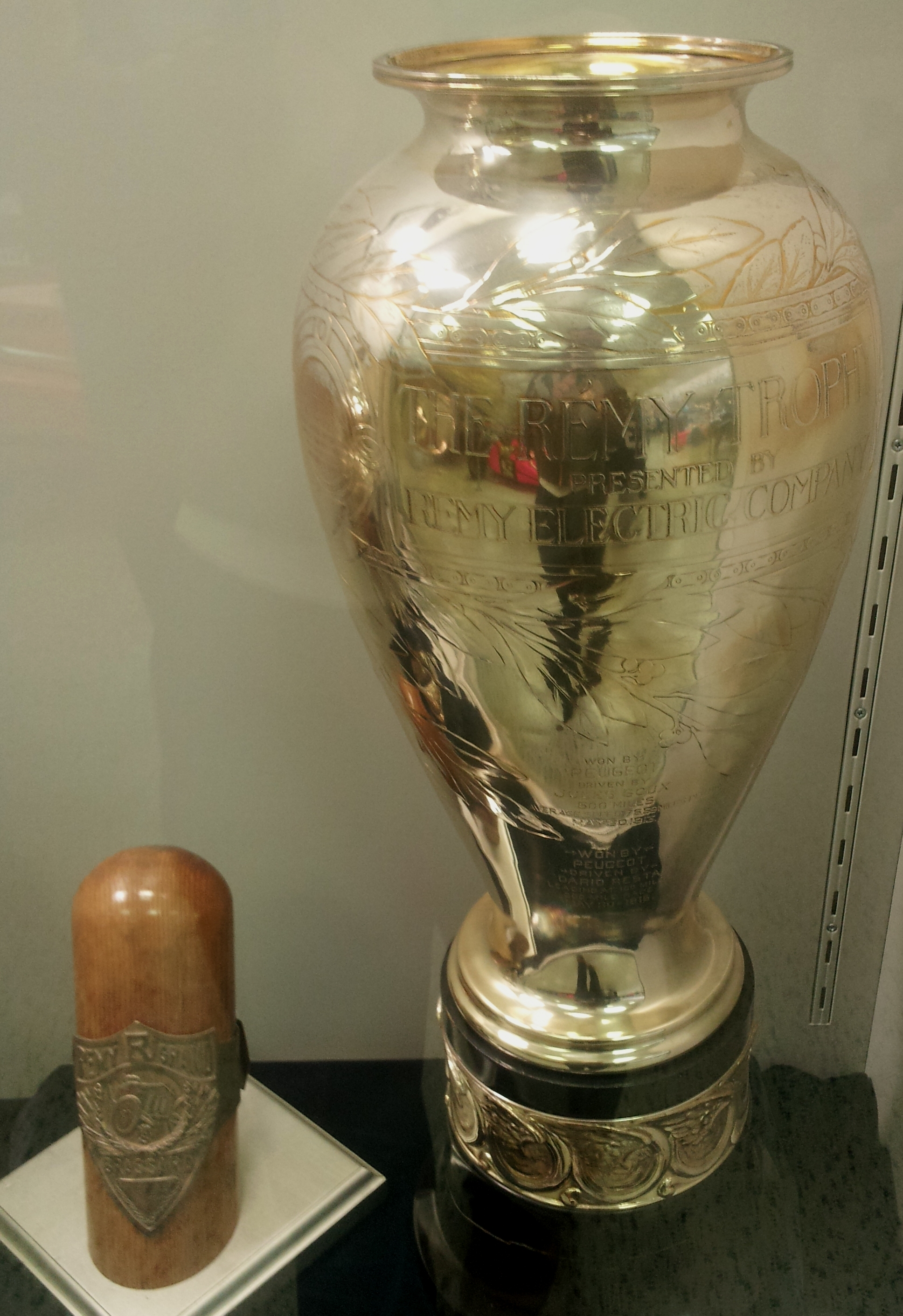
The Remy Grand Brassard (left) and Trophy (right) at the Indianapolis Motor Speedway Hall of Fame Museum

The Remy Brassard and Grand Trophy Races were automobile races held at the Indianapolis Motor Speedway, on each of four automobile race weekends conducted during the two years prior to the first Indianapolis 500. The prize was sponsored by magneto manufacturer Frank Remy. In addition to a conventional trophy, the winner was awarded a brassard (or arm shield), designed to be worn by the winner. The prize also came with a cash bonus of $75 per week until the next Remy Grand race.

== Race results ==
Year	Date	Winning Driver	Car	Race Distance		Time of Race	Winning Speed	Starting Cars
Year	Date	Winning Driver	Car	Miles	Laps	Time of Race	Winning Speed	Starting Cars
1909	Aug 21	(United States) Barney Oldfield	Benz	25	10	00:21:21.70	70.219 mph	3
1910	May 30	(United States) Ray Harroun	Marmon	50	20	00:42:31.33	70.551 mph	9
1910	July 2	(United States) Joe Dawson ^{[a]}	Marmon	100	40	01:20:40.70	74.369 mph	13
1910	Sept 3	(United States) Howdy Wilcox	National	100	40	01:23:03.56	72.237 mph	11

Note:

[a] Joe Dawson was awarded the victory in the Remy Grand Brassard race of July 2, 1910, after the original first place finisher, Bob Burman, was disqualified. The disqualification took place a few weeks after the race was run, because Burman's Marquette-Buick car did not meet the rules' definition of a "stock car." Burman's winning time would have been 1:20:35.64, for a speed of 74.447 mph.

== Sources ==
Scott, D. Bruce; INDY: Racing Before the 500; Indiana Reflections; 2005; ISBN 0-9766149-0-1.

Galpin, Darren; A Record of Motorsport Racing Before World War I.

http://www.motorsport.com/stats/champ/byyear.asp?Y=1909 http://www.motorsport.com/stats/champ/byyear.asp?Y=1910

http://www.champcarstats.com/year/1909.htm http://www.champcarstats.com/year/1910.htm
