= Ray Harroun =

American racing driver (1879–1968)

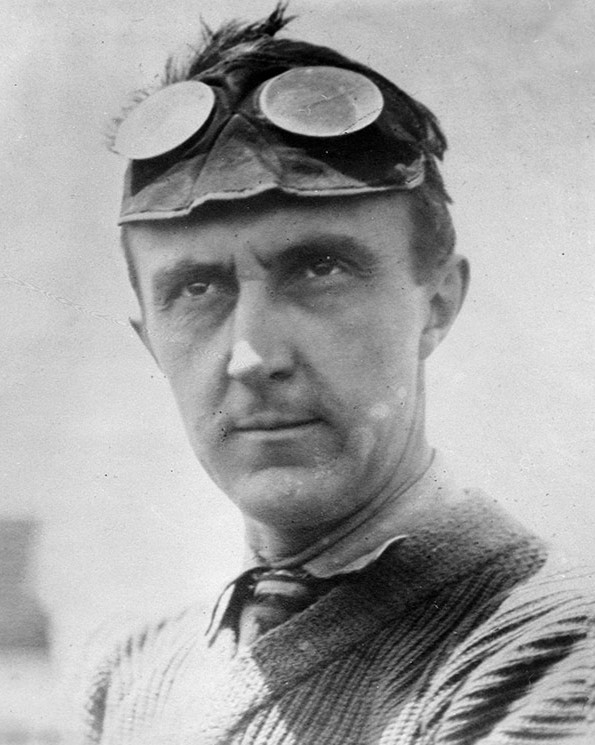
- Harroun, circa 1911
- Born: Ray Wade Harroun; January 12, 1879 Spartansburg, Pennsylvania, U.S.
- Died: January 19, 1968 (aged 89) Anderson, Indiana, U.S.

Championship titles
- Major victories Indianapolis 500 (1911)

Champ Car career
- 17 races run over 3 years
- First race: 1909 G & J Trophy (Indianapolis)
- Last race: 1911 Indianapolis 500 (Indianapolis)
- First win: 1910 Atlanta Speedway Trophy (Atlanta)
- Last win: 1911 Indianapolis 500 (Indianapolis)
Wins	Podiums	Poles
4	9	0

Ray Wade Harroun (January 12, 1879 – January 19, 1968) was an American racing driver and pioneering race car constructor. He is most famous for winning the inaugural Indianapolis 500 in 1911.

== Biography ==
Harroun was born on January 12, 1879, in Spartansburg, Pennsylvania to Russell LaFayette Harroun and Lucy A. Halliday. His father was a carpenter. Ray was their youngest child.

Harroun served on a U.S. Navy coaler during the Spanish American War.

Harroun participated in the original setting of the land speed record driving from Chicago to New York in 1903, and the re-taking of that record in 1904. He and four others drove in shifts non-stop to establish the record of 76 hours at the end of September, 1903. That time was bested by another team nearly a year later, and in October 1904, the Columbia team re-set the record at 58 hrs, 35 min. That record stood for nearly two years. Other drivers in both years included Bert Holcomb (who was in charge of the runs), Lawrence Duffie (Demonstrator of the Gasoline Dept of Electric Vehicle Company, which manufactured Columbia cars), and Harry Sandol. In 1903, the fifth driver was David R. Adams; in 1904 it was Eddie Bald.

=== Racing career ===
Nicknamed the "Little Professor" for his pioneering work of creating, with Howard Marmon, the Marmon Wasp, which was a revolutionary design being the first open-wheel single-seater racecar. Harroun is best known for winning the first running of the Indianapolis 500 Mile Race on May 30, 1911. He is known to have started at least 60 AAA-sanctioned races, during the years 1905–1911 (statistics on some of the shorter races document only the top three finishers, so some starts resulting in lower finishes may not be known), winning 19. From 1909 to 1911, Harroun drove primarily for the team operated by Indianapolis-based auto maker, Marmon. However, at least one 1909 race result shows him driving a Buick. Also, statistics from 1905 through 1908 show him driving cars described as "Harroun Custom" and "Harroun Sneezer."

=== Race wins ===
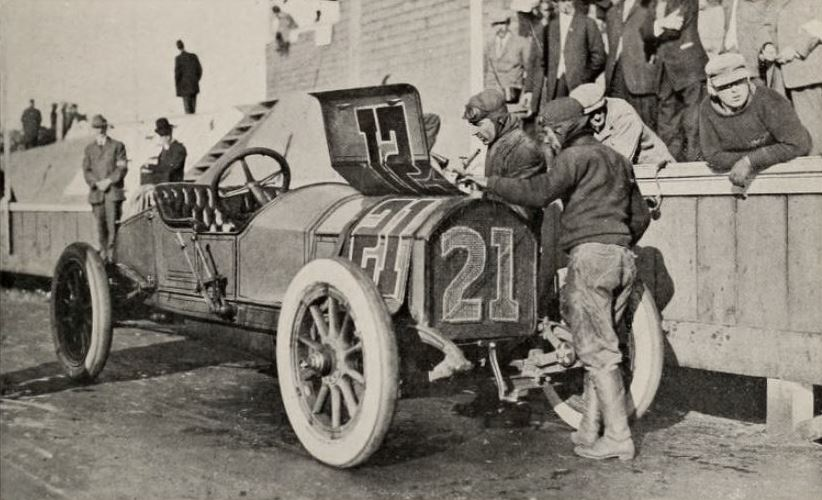
Harroun (standing, second from right) at the Atlanta Motordrome races in 1910

Harroun's race wins included: a 1910 100-mile race at the Atlanta Motordrome; the 1910 200-mile Wheeler-Schebler Trophy Race (at the Indianapolis Motor Speedway); the May 1910, 50-mile Remy Grand Brassard Race (also at IMS); three races at Churchill Downs (home of the Kentucky Derby); three races at the original Latonia Race Track; and races at tracks in New Orleans, Los Angeles, Long Island and Memphis. He is best known for winning the first Indianapolis 500, driving a Marmon.

Harroun won a total of eight races at the Indianapolis Motor Speedway, the second-most of any driver in the 100-year history of the track (the only driver with more victories at IMS is Johnny Aitken, with 15 wins in 1909–1916).

=== Revisionist champion designation ===
During the years that Harroun was driving, the AAA designated some races each year as "championship" events. However, there was no actual year-long points championship, and no points were awarded by the AAA Contest Board. In 1927, the Contest Board negated their history; points were assigned retroactively, and National Champions were designated for those years. At that time, Harroun was designated the champion for the 1910 season. Historians consider these revised results to be unofficial.

=== The inaugural Indianapolis 500 ===
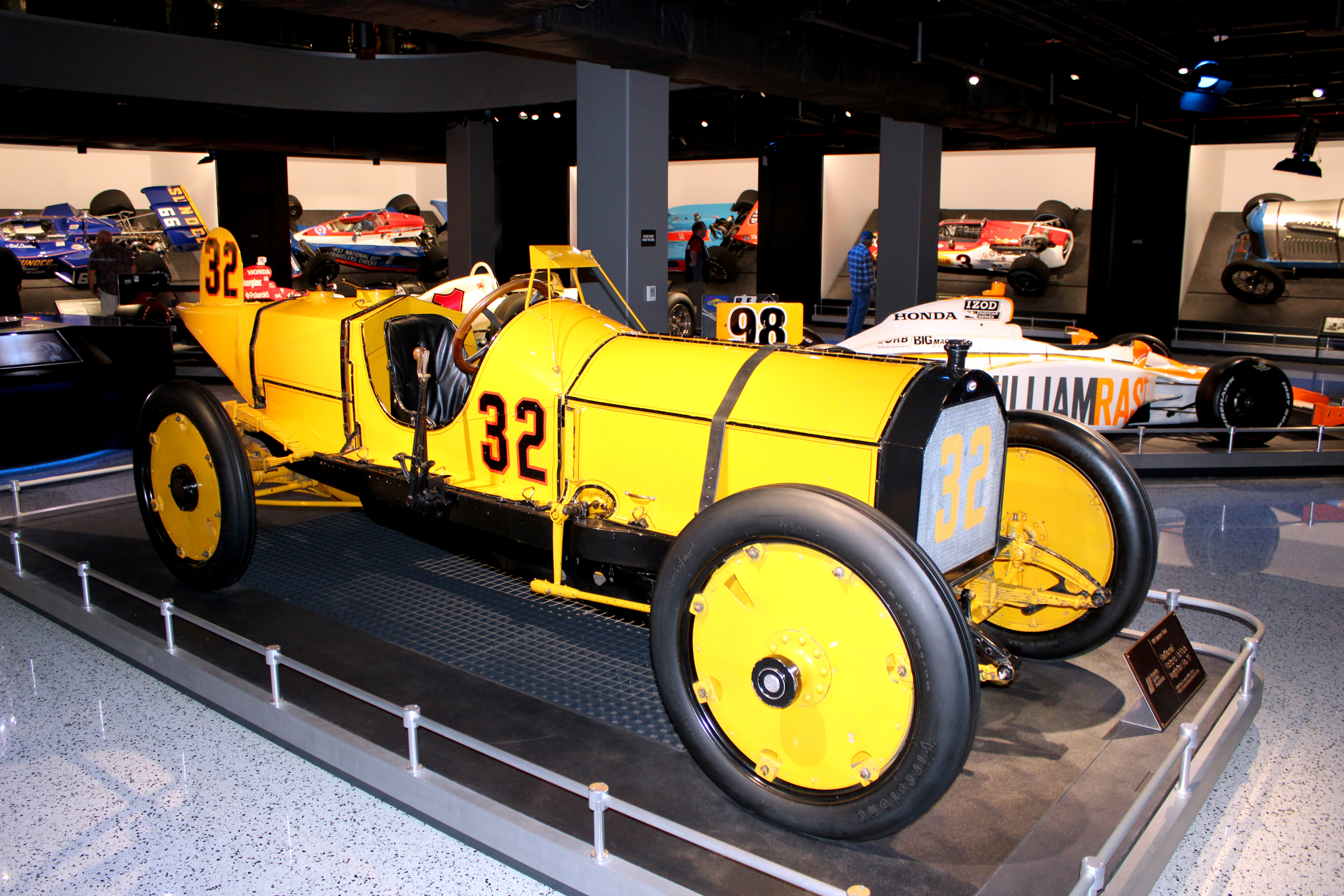
Harroun's original Marmon "Wasp" on display at the Indianapolis Motor Speedway Museum

At the inaugural Indianapolis 500 in 1911, Harroun's use of what would now be called a rear-view mirror, rather than the riding mechanic specified in the rules, created controversy, but was ultimately allowed. Harroun went on to win at an average speed of 74.602 miles per hour (120.060 km/h). Harroun, who came out of retirement to race in the first 500, would not race after 1911. Harroun's historic Firestone-shod yellow #32 Marmon "Wasp," in which he won the Indianapolis 500, is on display at the Indianapolis Motor Speedway Hall of Fame Museum.

The 50th Anniversary race in 1961 was won by A. J. Foyt, and both Harroun and Foyt appeared together on the television program I've Got a Secret—their secret being their respective wins at Indianapolis.

=== Later career ===
After retiring from racing, Harroun continued engineering work for Marmon, and later for the Maxwell racing team.

In 1916, Harroun started his own automobile company in Wayne, Michigan, called the Harroun Motor Car Company. The venture folded after World War I, and today a street in Wayne is named for him.

In 1927, Harroun joined Lincoln Products.

Harroun continued to work in the automotive industry until his retirement at age 79. He died on January 19, 1968.

=== Legacy ===
Harroun was inducted in the Indianapolis Motor Speedway Hall of Fame in 1952, the Motorsports Hall of Fame of America in 2000, and the Michigan Motorsports Hall of Fame in 2010.

== Motorsports career results ==
=== Indianapolis 500 results ===
Year	Car	Start	Qual	Rank	Finish	Laps	Led	Retired
1911	32	28	—	—	1	200	88	Running
Totals						200	88	

Starts	1
Poles	0
Front Row	0
Wins	1
Top 5	1
Top 10	1
Retired	0

Preceded by None	Indianapolis 500 Winner; 1911	Succeeded by Joe Dawson
