= Lewis Strang =

American racing driver (1884–1911)

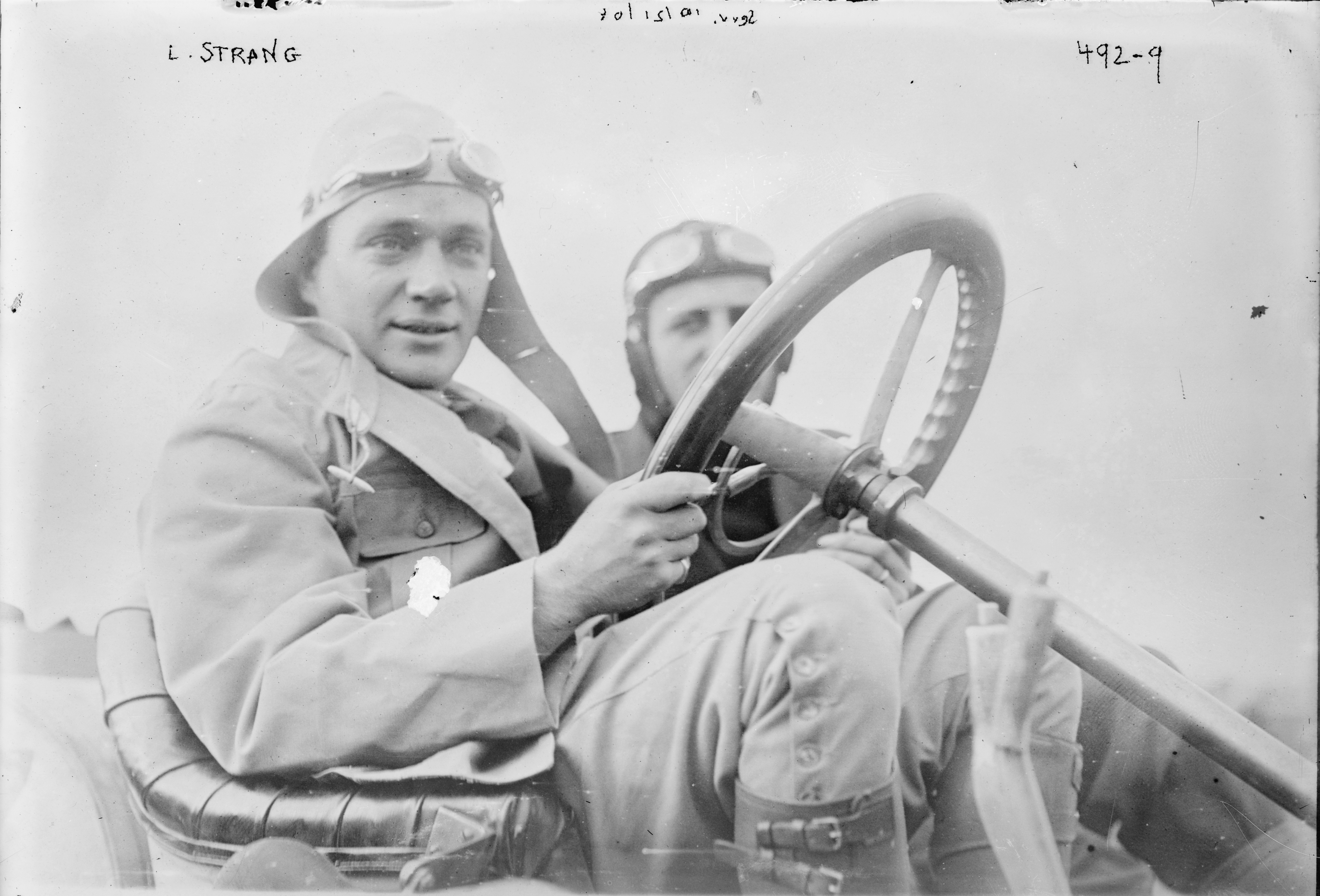
- Strang in 1908
- Born: Louis Putnam Strang; August 7, 1884 Amsterdam, New York, U.S.
- Died: July 20, 1911 (aged 26) Blue River, Wisconsin, U.S.

Champ Car career
- 12 races run over 3 years
- First race: 1909 Indiana Trophy (Crown Point)
- Last race: 1911 Indianapolis 500 (Indianapolis)
- First win: 1909 G & J Trophy (Indianapolis)
Wins	Podiums	Poles
1	2	0

Lewis Strang (born Louis Putnam Strang, August 7, 1884 – July 20, 1911) was an American racing driver.

== Biography ==
Strang was born on August 7, 1884, in Amsterdam, New York. In 1908, he won the First American International Road Race, held in Briarcliff Manor, New York. As the first entrant for the 1911 Indianapolis 500, which predated modern on-track qualifications, Strang was pole sitter for the race.

Strang was killed in a testing accident in Wisconsin on July 20, 1911. He was driving approximately five to ten miles an hour and trying to avoid an approaching farmer. Strang's car became embedded in soft dirt, causing it to tumble down an embankment. He was pinned underneath the overturned vehicle and was crushed to death.

== Legacy ==
In 1951, negationist sportswriter Russ Catlin selected Strang as the 1908 AAA National Champion.

== Motorsports career results ==
=== Indianapolis 500 results ===
Year	Car	Start	Qual	Rank	Finish	Laps	Led	Retired
1911	1	1	—	—	29	109	0	Steering
Totals						109	0	

Starts	1
Poles	1
Front Row	1
Wins	0
Top 5	0
Top 10	0
Retired	1
