= Mallock Mk.XI =

Open-wheel formula racing car

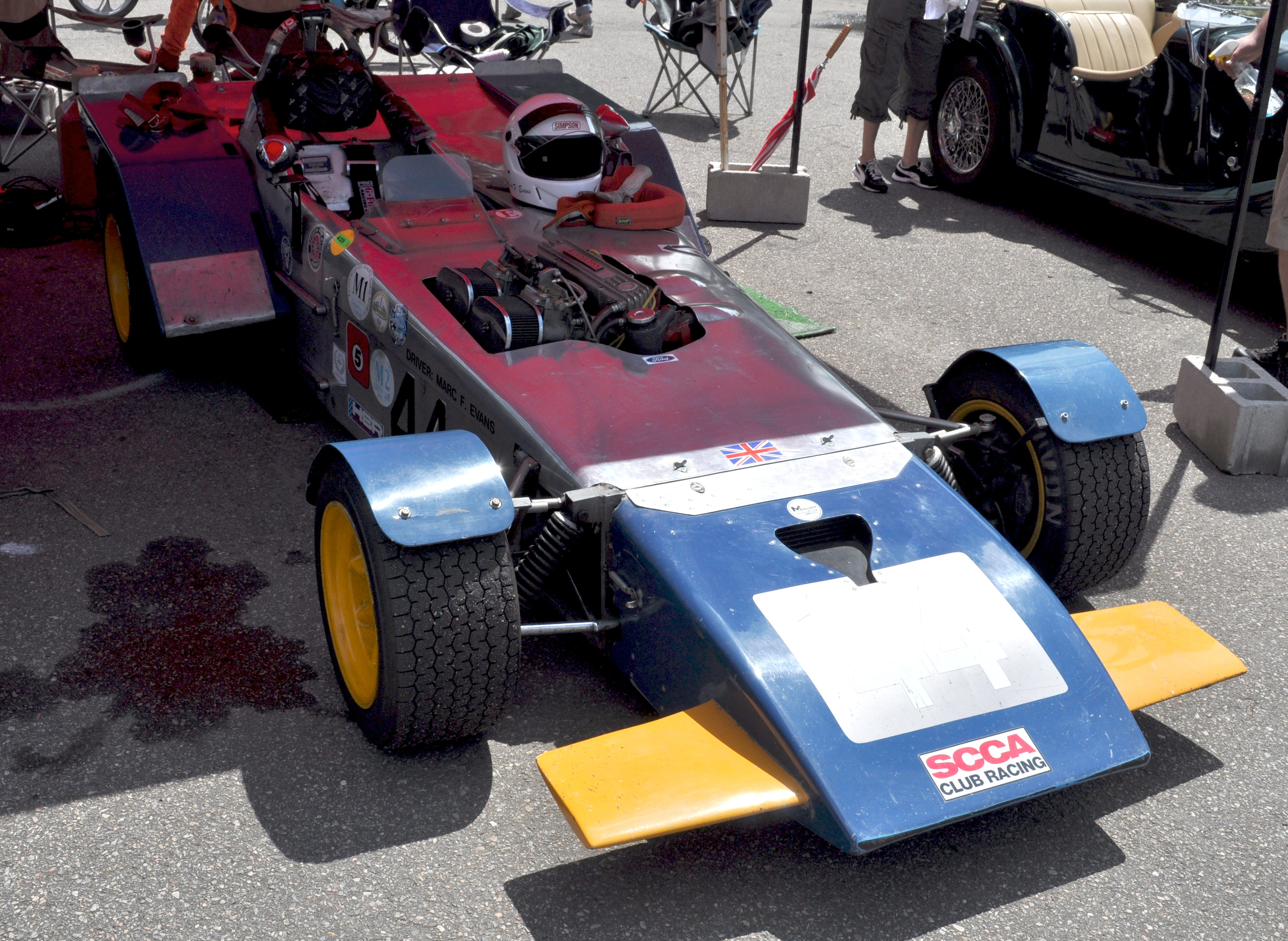
Mallock MkXI front

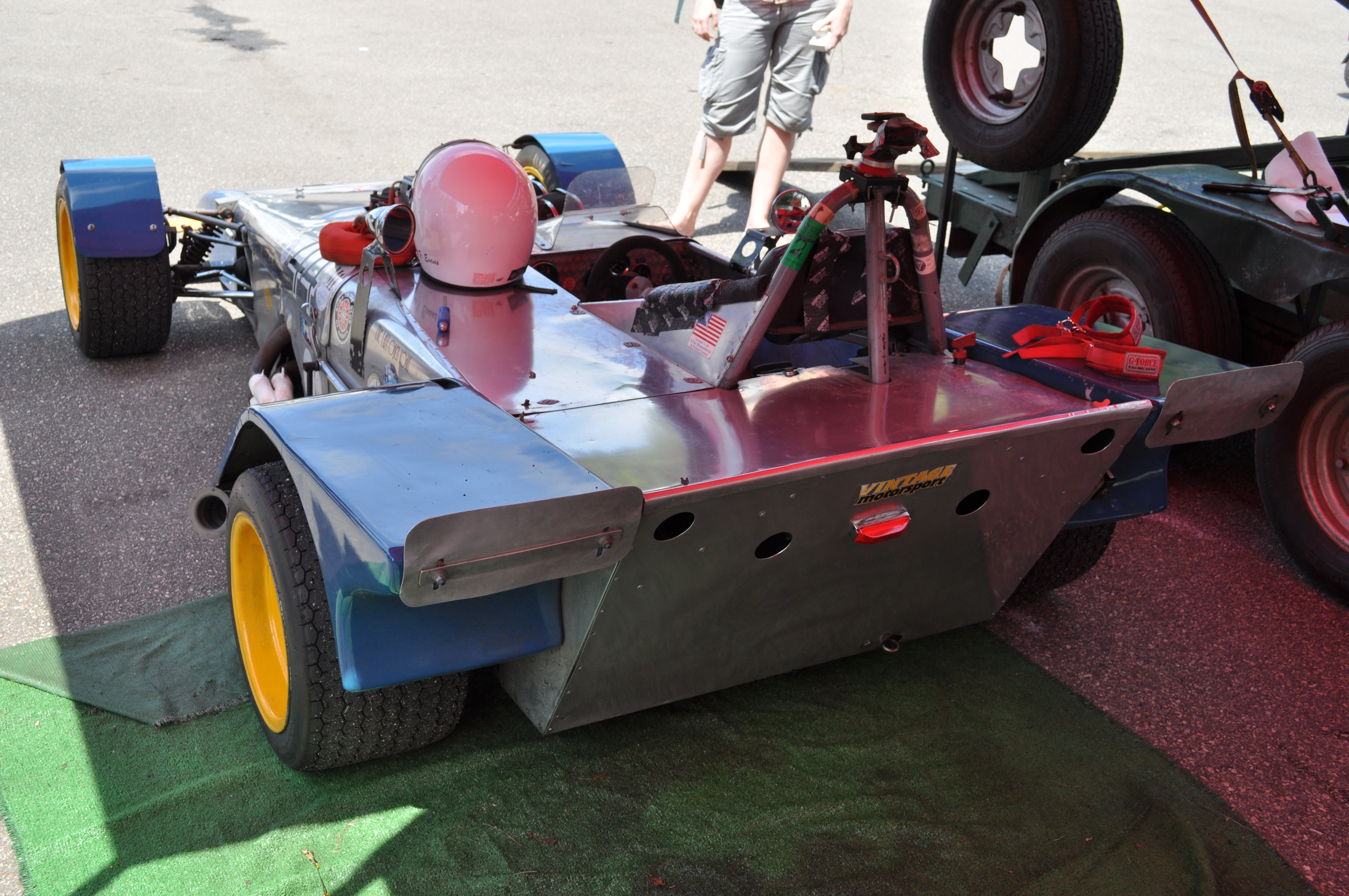
Mallock MkXI rear

The Mallock Mk.XI, also designated as the Mallock Mk.11, is an open-wheel formula racing car, developed and built by Ray Mallock Ltd., in 1970. It was specifically designed and constructed to compete in the Clubman category and class; which catered to front-engined sports prototype race cars. It was also later used in Formula Three racing. It was powered by a naturally-aspirated 1.6 L (98 cu in) Ford-Cosworth FVA four-cylinder engine, producing approximately 220 hp (160 kW).
