= Speedway Helmet Race =

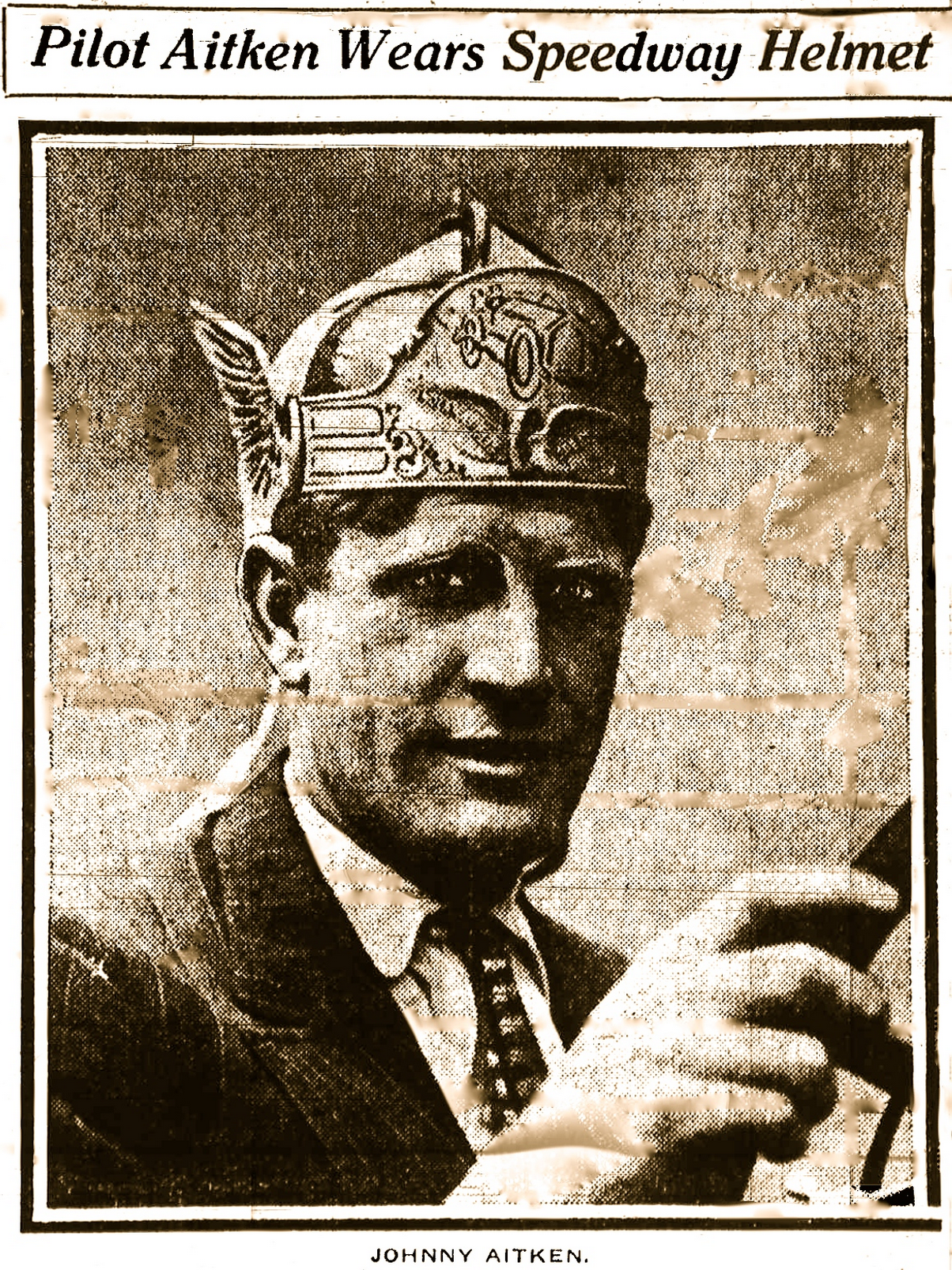
AitkenSpeedwayHelmet

The Speedway Helmet Race was an automobile race held at the Indianapolis Motor Speedway, during each of the three race weekends of 1910 (the last year prior to the first Indianapolis 500). The trophy was a metal helmet, featuring the Speedway's "Wings and Wheel" logo, which the winner wore while defending his title in the next Speedway Helmet Race. The photo to the right is of auto racing star Johnny Aitken. He modeled the unique trophy in May 1910 just days before the first race in which it was the primary prize. He never won the award.

== Race results ==
Year	Date	Winning Driver	Car	Race Distance		Time of Race	Winning Speed
Year	Date	Winning Driver	Car	Miles	Laps	Time of Race	Winning Speed
1910	May 27	(United States) Bob Burman	Buick	5	2	00:03:37.24	82.858 mph
1910	July 1	(United States) Eddie Hearne	Benz	10	4	00:07:13.00	83.141 mph
1910	Sept 3	(United States) Eddie Hearne	Benz	10	4	00:07:03.41	85.024 mph

== Sources ==
- Scott, D. Bruce; INDY: Racing Before the 500; Indiana Reflections; 2005; ISBN 0-9766149-0-1.
- Galpin, Darren; A Record of Motorsport Racing Before World War I.
- Dill, Mark, www.firstsuperspeedway.com (Photo and associated caption)
