= G & J Trophy Race =

Former motor race in Indianapolis

The G & J Trophy Race was an automobile race held at the Indianapolis Motor Speedway in each of the two years prior to the first Indianapolis 500. The trophy was sponsored by the G & J Tire Company.

== Race results ==
Year	Date	Winning Driver	Car	Race Distance		Time of Race	Winning Speed	Starting Cars
Year	Date	Winning Driver	Car	Miles	Laps	Time of Race	Winning Speed	Starting Cars
1909	Aug 20	(United States) Lewis Strang	Buick	100	40	01:32:47.08	64.611 mph	6
1910	July 1	(United States) Billy Pearce ^{[a]}	FAL	50	20	00:45:12.83	66.351 mph	11

Note:

[a] Billy Pearce was awarded the victory in the G & J Trophy race of July 1, 1910, after the original first and second place finishers (Bob Burman and Louis Chevrolet) were disqualified. The disqualifications took place a few weeks after the race was run, because Burman's and Chevrolet's Marquette-Buick cars did not meet the rules' definition of a "stock car." Burman's winning time would have been 0:40:03.08, for a speed of 74.904 mph.

== Sources ==
- Scott, D. Bruce; INDY: Racing Before the 500; Indiana Reflections; 2005; ISBN 0-9766149-0-1.
- Galpin, Darren; A Record of Motorsport Racing Before World War I.
- http://www.motorsport.com/stats/champ/byyear.asp?Y=1909
- http://www.motorsport.com/stats/champ/byyear.asp?Y=1910
- http://www.champcarstats.com/year/1909.htm
- http://www.champcarstats.com/year/1910.htm
