= 1934 Indianapolis 500 =

American motor race

22nd Indianapolis 500
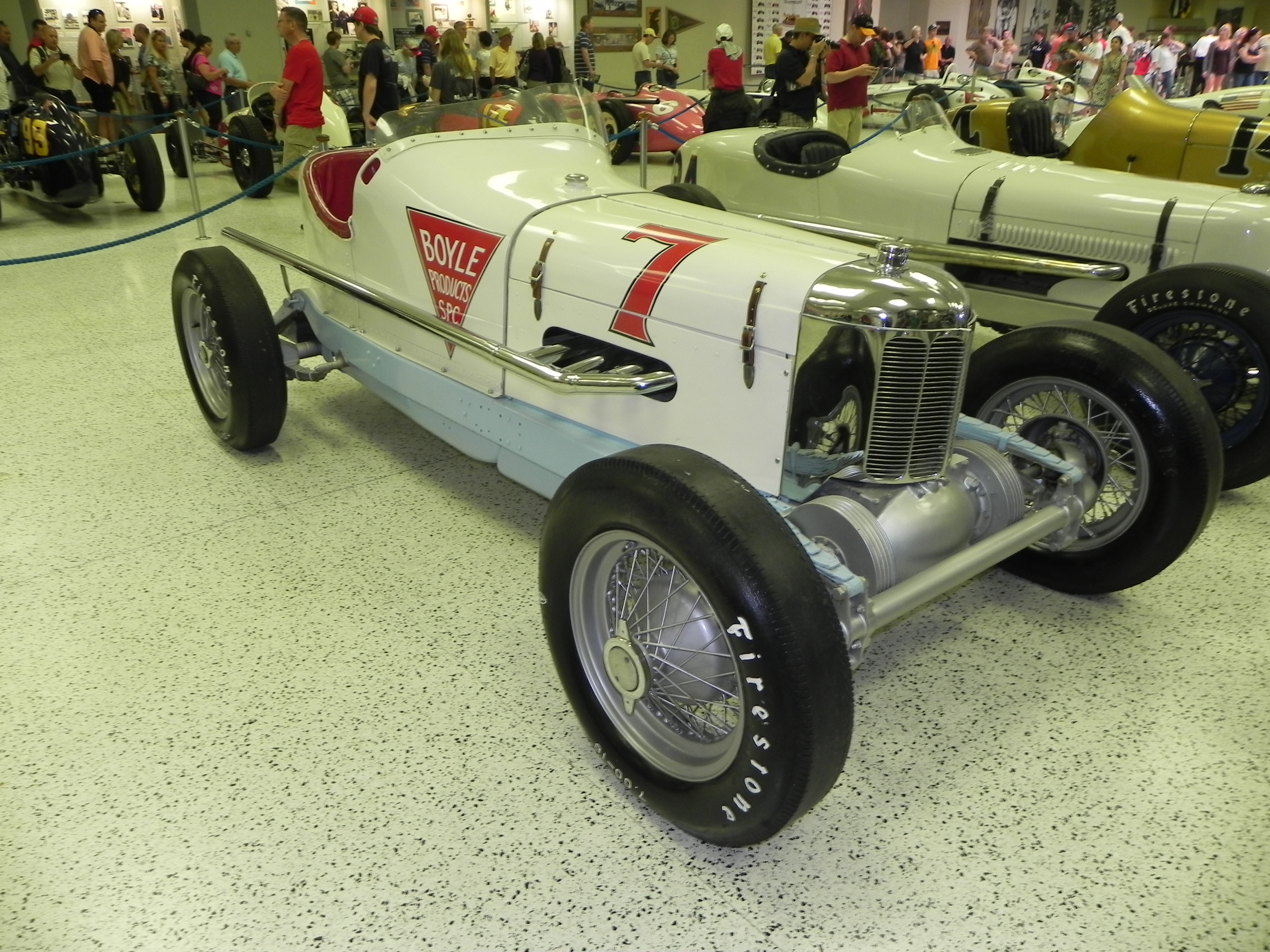

Indianapolis Motor Speedway

Indianapolis 500
- Sanctioning body: AAA
- Date: May 30, 1934
- Winner: Bill Cummings
- Winning Riding Mechanic: Earl Unversaw
- Winning Entrant: H. C. Henning
- Winning time: 4:46:05.20
- Average speed: 104.863 mph
- Pole position: Kelly Petillo
- Pole speed: 119.329 mph
- Most laps led: Frank Brisko (69)

Pre-race
- Pace car: LaSalle Model 350
- Pace car driver: Willard "Big Boy" Rader
- Starter: Seth Klein
- Honorary referee: Roy D. Chapin
- Estimated attendance: 140,000

Chronology
Previous	Next
1933	1935

The 22nd International 500-Mile Sweepstakes Race was held at the Indianapolis Motor Speedway on May 30, 1934. The winner was the number seven car driven by Bill Cummings, an Indianapolis native, at an average speed of 104.863 miles per hour. Cummings led for 57 laps total, including the last 26. Of the 33 cars that began the race, only 12 were running at the finish, although there were no crashes resulting in serious injuries. One serious incident involved George Bailey, whose car went over the outside wall, but resulted in only a broken wrist to the driver. The finish was the closest in the history of the race to that point, with second-place finisher Mauri Rose within 100 yards of Cummings at the finish (officially 27.25 seconds behind). Rose would also file a protest that Cummings had illegally gained ground during a "slow-down" period following a crash.

Cummings was accompanied by riding mechanic Earl Unversaw. The race was part of the 1934 AAA Championship Car season.

== Background ==
In an effort to improve safety, the maximum field size was capped at 33 cars. 33 starters has remained the maximum field size since, with the exception of the 1979 and 1997 races. After several consecutive 500s with multiple fatalities, efforts were also made to reduce speeds through fuel limits; entries were limited to 2.5 U.S. gallons (9.5 L) of fuel for qualification and 45 U.S. gallons (170 L) of fuel for the race.

For 1934, riding mechanics were required.

== Time trials ==
Ten-lap (25 mile) qualifying runs were utilized. Kelly Petillo earned the pole position with a speed of 119.329 mph (192.041 km/h). Babe Stapp and Charles Tramison were both disqualified for exceeding the fuel limit in their qualifying runs.

During a qualification attempt, driver Pete Kreis lost control in turn 1, climbed over the wall, and struck a tree outside of the track. He and his riding mechanic were fatally injured.

== Starting grid ==
Row	Inside		Middle		Outside	
1	17	(United States) Kelly Petillo	3	(United States) Wilbur Shaw	32	(United States) Frank Brisko
2	9	(United States) Mauri Rose	4	(United States) Chet Gardner	26	(United States) Phil Shafer
3	8	(United States) Tony Gulotta	36	(United States) Al Miller	10	(United States) Russ Snowberger
4	7	(United States) Bill Cummings	31	(United States) Ralph Hepburn	18	(United States) George Barringer R
5	1	(United States) Louis Meyer W	24	(United States) Herb Ardinger R	15	(United States) Shorty Cantlon
6	58	(United States) George Bailey R	51	(United States) Al Gordon	22	(United States) Cliff Bergere
7	12	(United States) Deacon Litz	2	(United States) Lou Moore	41	(United States) Johnny Sawyer
8	6	(United States) Dave Evans	35	(United States) Rex Mays R	16	(United States) Joe Russo
9	42	(United States) Dusty Fahrnow R	73	(United States) Doc MacKenzie	45	(United States) Rick Decker
10	49	(United States) Charles Crawford R	5	(United States) Stubby Stubblefield	63	(United States) Harry McQuinn R
11	29	(United States) Gene Haustein	46	(United States) Chet Miller	33	(United States) Johnny Seymour

R Indianapolis 500 rookie
W Indianapolis 500 winner

=== Alternates ===
- First alternate: Willard Prentiss

=== Failed to Qualify ===
- Bill Chittum R (#59)
- Maynard Clark R (#56)
- George Connor R (#39)
- Wesley Crawford (#44)
- Danny Day R (#62)
- Pete DePaolo (#27) - Withdrew
- Leon Duray (#54)
- Fred Frame (#34)
- Sam Hoffman R (#47)
- Ted Horn R (#53)
- Harry Hunt R (#43)
- Pete Kreis (#14) - Fatal accident
- Harry Lewis R (#52)
- Tee Linn R (#62)
- Milt Marion R (#57)
- Vern Ornduff R (#62)
- Jack Petticord (#52)
- Harold Shaw R (#65) - Driver refused
- Orville Smith R (#61) - Driver rejected
- Babe Stapp (#44, #54)
- Al Theisen R (#53)
- Charles Tramison R (#72)
- Bob Wallace R (#53)
- Doc Williams R (#38) - Driver rejected

== Race summary ==
At the start, polesitter Petillo took the lead for the first 4 laps. But the pace was 8 mph off the record of the previous year, owing to new fuel regulations that limited cars to 45 gallons for the entire race. Frank Brisko lead much of the first half of the race, but began to fall back as the race approached half-distance. By half-distance, Mauri Rose was leading, but close behind him was Cummings. "Wild Bill" first assumed the lead at 325 miles as Rose pitted for fuel, then lost it as he too made a stop. Cummings then closed on Rose and passed him with 70 miles to go. Both drivers, confident that they had enough fuel, then upped their pace to reach 140 mph on the straights. Cummings and Rose were never more than 30 seconds apart in the last part of the race. Cummings took the checkered with a new record average speed, despite the new fuel limitations. Rose was second, 27 seconds behind.

== Box score ==
Finish	Start	No	Name	Entrant	Chassis	Engine	Qual	Rank	Laps	Status
1	10	7	(United States) Bill Cummings	H. C. Henning	Miller	Miller	116.116	6	200	104.863 mph
2	4	9	(United States) Mauri Rose	Leon Duray	Stevens	Miller	116.044	7	200	+27.23
3	20	2	(United States) Lou Moore (Wilbur Shaw Laps 77–152)	California Racers, Inc.	Miller	Miller	113.442	16	200	+6:14.43
4	19	12	(United States) Deacon Litz (Babe Stapp Laps 67–172)	A. B. Litz	Miller	Miller	113.731	14	200	+11:41.07
5	24	16	(United States) Joe Russo	Joe E. Russo	Duesenberg	Duesenberg	113.115	18	200	+14:14.01
6	8	36	(United States) Al Miller (Zeke Meyer Laps 169–200)	Phil Shafer	Rigling	Buick	113.307	17	200	+19:12.88
7	18	22	(United States) Cliff Bergere (Tony Gulotta Laps 119–130) (Billy Winn Laps 131–141)	William S. White	Weil	Miller	115.243	8	200	+20:36.34
8	9	10	(United States) Russ Snowberger	Russell Snowberger	Snowberger	Studebaker	111.428	23	200	+22:14.85
9	3	32	(United States) Frank Brisko (Rex Mays Laps 130–200)	F.W.D. Auto Company	Miller	Miller	116.894	4	200	+23:52.43
10	14	24	(United States) Herb Ardinger R (Danny Day Laps 93–133)	Angelo Lucenti	Graham	Graham	111.722	22	200	+26:37.27
11	1	17	(United States) Kelly Petillo	Joe Marks	Adams	Miller	119.329	1	200	+35:00.15
12	29	5	(United States) Stubby Stubblefield (Dave Evans Laps 124–144)	Cummins Engine Company	Duesenberg	Cummins	105.921	32	200	+52:38.63
13	28	49	(United States) Charles Crawford R	Detroit Gasket & Manufacturing	Ford	Ford V8	108.784	30	110	In pits
14	11	31	(United States) Ralph Hepburn (Louis Meyer Laps 138–164)	Ralph Hepburn	Miller	Miller	114.321	10	164	Connecting rod
15	12	18	(United States) George Barringer R (Chet Gardner Laps 98–161)	H. C. Henning	Miller	Miller	113.859	11	161	Bent front axle
16	6	26	(United States) Phil Shafer (Zeke Meyer Laps 97–130)	Phil Shafer	Rigling	Buick	113.816	12	130	Camshaft drive
17	7	8	(United States) Tony Gulotta	Floyd Smith	Cooper	Studebaker	113.733	13	94	Rod
18	13	1	(United States) Louis Meyer W	Louis Meyer	Stevens	Miller	112.332	20	92	Oil tank
19	22	6	(United States) Dave Evans	Cummins Engine Company	Duesenberg	Cummins	102.414	33	81	Transmission
20	15	15	(United States) Shorty Cantlon (Billy Winn Laps 39–76)	William J. Cantlon	Stevens	Miller	117.875	2	76	Crankshaft
21	5	4	(United States) Chet Gardner	Alden Sampson II	Stevens	Miller	114.786	9	72	Rod
22	17	51	(United States) Al Gordon	Paul Weirick	Adams	Miller	116.273	5	66	Crash T1
23	23	35	(United States) Rex Mays R	Fred Frame	Duesenberg	Miller	113.639	15	53	Front axle
24	25	42	(United States) Dusty Fahrnow R	Irving Goldberg	Cooper	Cooper	113.070	19	28	Rod
25	21	41	(United States) Johnny Sawyer	Lencki & Unger	Miller	Lencki	109.808	27	27	Rod
26	33	33	(United States) Johnny Seymour	Fred Frame	Adams	Miller	108.591	31	22	Pinion gear
27	27	45	(United States) Rick Decker	Rickliffe Decker	Miller	Miller	110.895	26	17	Clutch
28	2	3	(United States) Wilbur Shaw	Joe Marks	Stevens	Miller	117.647	3	15	Lost oil
29	26	73	(United States) Doc MacKenzie	Mikan & Carson	Mikan-Carson	Studebaker	111.933	21	15	Crash NC
30	31	29	(United States) Gene Haustein	Lawrence J. Martz	Hudson	Hudson	109.426	28	13	Crash T4
31	30	63	(United States) Harry McQuinn R	Michel DeBaets	Rigling	Miller	111.067	24	13	Rod
32	16	58	(United States) George Bailey R	Roy Scott	Snowberger	Studebaker	111.063	25	12	Crash T3
33	32	46	(United States) Chet Miller	Bohn Aluminum and Brass Corporation	Ford	Ford V8	109.252	29	11	Crash T1

Note: Relief drivers in parentheses

W Former Indianapolis 500 winner

R Indianapolis 500 Rookie

=== Race statistics ===
Lap Leaders
Laps	Leader
1–6	Kelly Petillo
7–71	Frank Brisko
72–78	Bill Cummings
79–109	Mauri Rose
110–113	Frank Brisko
114–124	Mauri Rose
125–148	Bill Cummings
149–174	Mauri Rose
175–200	Bill Cummings

Total laps led
Driver	Laps
Frank Brisko	69
Mauri Rose	68
Bill Cummings	57
Kelly Petillo	6

Yellow Flags ("Slow-down" periods)
Laps*	Reason
11–13	Chet Miller crash turn 1, George Bailey crash turn 3
13–15	Gene Haustein, Doc MacKenzie crash turn 4
* – Approximate lap counts

1933 Indianapolis 500; Louis Meyer	1934 Indianapolis 500; Bill Cummings	1935 Indianapolis 500; Kelly Petillo
Preceded by 104.162 mph (1933 Indianapolis 500)	Record for the fastest average speed 104.863 mph	Succeeded by 106.240 mph (1935 Indianapolis 500)
