= 1934 AAA Championship Car season =

Auto racing season

- AAA National Championship Trail

Season
- Races: 4
- Start date: May 30
- End date: December 23

Awards
- National champion: (United States) Bill Cummings
- Indianapolis 500 winner: (United States) Bill Cummings

The 1934 AAA Championship Car season consisted of four races, beginning in Speedway, Indiana on May 30 and concluding in Inglewood, California on December 23. The AAA National Champion and Indianapolis 500 winner was Bill Cummings.

Pete Kreis died at Indianapolis, during practice. George Brayen died at Syracuse during the race.

== Schedule and results ==
| Rnd | Date | Race name | Track | Location | Type | Pole position | Winning driver |
|---|---|---|---|---|---|---|---|
| 1 | May 30 | (United States) International 500 Mile Sweepstakes | Indianapolis Motor Speedway | Speedway, Indiana | Brick | (United States) Kelly Petillo | (United States) Bill Cummings |
| 2 | August 25 | (United States) Springfield 100 | Illinois State Fairgrounds | Springfield, Illinois | Dirt | (United States) Johnny Sawyer | (United States) Billy Winn |
| 3 | September 9 | (United States) Syracuse 100 | New York State Fairgrounds | Syracuse, New York | Dirt | (United States) Bill Cummings | (United States) Shorty Cantlon |
| 4 | December 23 | (United States) Mines Field Race | Mines Field | Inglewood, California | Road | (United States) Doc MacKenzie | (United States) Kelly Petillo |

Dirt/Brick Oval
Road Course/Hill Climb

== Final points standings ==
Note: Drivers had to be running at the finish to score points. Points scored by drivers sharing a ride were split according to percentage of race driven. Starters were not allowed to score points as relief drivers, if a race starter finished the race in another car, in a points scoring position, those points were awarded to the driver who had started the car.
The final standings based on reference.

| Pos | Driver | INDY (United States) | SPR (United States) | SYR (United States) | MIF (United States) | Pts |
|---|---|---|---|---|---|---|
| 1 | (United States) Bill Cummings | 1 | 13 | **7** | 8 | 681.7 |
| 2 | (United States) Mauri Rose | 2 | 3 | | | 530 |
| 3 | (United States) Kelly Petillo | **11** | 5 | DNQ | 1 | 300 |
| 4 | (United States) Russ Snowberger | 8 | 2 | 5 | 12 | 300 |
| 5 | (United States) Joe Russo | 5 | | | | 300 |
| 6 | (United States) Al Miller | 6 | 11 | 6 | 10 | 280 |
| 7 | (United States) Frank Brisko | 9* | 4 | 2 | 9 | 264.5 |
| 8 | (United States) Lou Moore | 3 | | DNS | | 248 |
| 9 | (United States) Shorty Cantlon | 20 | 6 | 1 | 7 | 211.2 |
| 10 | (United States) Billy Winn | 7 | 1 | 3 | | 211 |
| 11 | (United States) Babe Stapp | 4 | | | 18 | 185.5 |
| 12 | (United States) Wilbur Shaw | 28 | | | 2 | 180 |
| 13 | (United States) Cliff Bergere | 7 | | DNQ | | 177 |
| 14 | (United States) Deacon Litz | 4 | | DNS | | 164.5 |
| 15 | (United States) Doc MacKenzie | 29 | | DNQ | **4** | 140 |
| 16 | (United States) Chet Gardner | 21 | | DNQ | 5 | 120 |
| 17 | (United States) Al Gordon | 22 | 14 | DNQ | 6 | 100 |
| 18 | (United States) Ralph Hepburn | 13 | | | 3 | 83.7 |
| 19 | (United States) Floyd Roberts RY | | | | 3 | 76.2 |
| 20 | (United States) George Barringer | 14 | 10 | 4 | 17 | 70 |
| 21 | (United States) Herb Ardinger R | 10 | 8 | 11 | | 69.7 |
| 22 | (United States) Zeke Meyer | 6 | | | | 40 |
| 23 | (United States) Harry Hunt R | DNQ | 7 | | | 40 |
| 24 | (United States) Harris Insinger R | | | | 7 | 38.8 |
| 25 | (United States) Gene Haustein | 30 | 12 | 9 | 11 | 30 |
| 26 | (United States) Fred Frame | DNQ | | | 8 | 18.3 |
| 27 | (United States) Danny Day R | 10 | | | | 10.2 |
| - | (United States) Johnny Sawyer | 25 | **9*** | 12 | | 0 |
| - | (United States) George Brayen | | | 10 | | 0 |
| - | (United States) Stubby Stubblefield | 12 | | | 15 | 0 |
| - | (United States) Louis Meyer | 18 | | | 13 | 0 |
| - | (United States) Cy Yocum R | | | 13 | | 0 |
| - | (United States) Bob Sall R | | | | 14 | 0 |
| - | (United States) Phil Shafer | 15 | | | | 0 |
| - | (United States) Rex Mays R | 23 | | | 16 | 0 |
| - | (United States) Charles Crawford R | 16 | | | | 0 |
| - | (United States) Tony Gulotta | 17 | | | | 0 |
| - | (United States) Dave Evans | 19 | | | | 0 |
| - | (United States) Guy Devlin R | | | | 19 | 0 |
| - | (United States) Dusty Fahrnow | 24 | | | | 0 |
| - | (United States) Johnny Seymour | 26 | | | | 0 |
| - | (United States) Rick Decker | 27 | | | | 0 |
| - | (United States) Harry McQuinn R | 31 | | | | 0 |
| - | (United States) George Bailey R | 32 | | | | 0 |
| - | (United States) Chet Miller | 33 | | | | 0 |
| - | (United States) George Lyons | | | DNS | | 0 |
| - | (United States) Charles Tramison | DNQ | DNQ | DNQ | | 0 |
| - | (United States) Harry Lewis | DNQ | DNQ | | | 0 |
| - | (United States) Al Theisen | DNQ | DNQ | | | 0 |
| - | (United States) Bill Chittum | DNQ | | | | 0 |
| - | (United States) Maynard Clark | DNQ | | | | 0 |
| - | (United States) George Connor | DNQ | | | | 0 |
| - | (United States) Wesley Crawford | DNQ | | | | 0 |
| - | (United States) Leon Duray | DNQ | | | | 0 |
| - | (United States) Sam Hoffman | DNQ | | | | 0 |
| - | (United States) Ted Horn | DNQ | | | | 0 |
| - | (United States) Pete Kreis | DNQ | | | | 0 |
| - | (United States) Tee Linn | DNQ | | | | 0 |
| - | (United States) Milt Marion | DNQ | | | | 0 |
| - | (United States) Vern Ornduff | DNQ | | | | 0 |
| - | (United States) Jack Petticord | DNQ | | | | 0 |
| - | (United States) Willard Prentiss | DNQ | | | | 0 |
| - | (United States) Bob Wallace | DNQ | | | | 0 |
| - | (United States) Charles Engle | | | DNQ | | 0 |
| - | (United States) Ted Kessler | | | DNQ | | 0 |
| - | (United States) Gene Pirong | | | DNQ | | 0 |
| - | (United States) Wally Zale | | | DNQ | | 0 |
| - | (United States) Peter DePaolo | Wth | | | | 0 |
| - | (United States) Harold Shaw | DNP | | | | 0 |
| - | (United States) Orville Smith | DNP | | | | 0 |
| - | (United States) Doc Williams | DNP | | | | 0 |
| - | (United States) Arthur Brandt | | | DSQ | | 0 |
| Pos | Driver | INDY (United States) | SPR (United States) | SYR (United States) | MIF (United States) | Pts |

| Color | Result |
|---|---|
| Gold | Winner |
| Silver | 2nd place |
| Bronze | 3rd place |
| Green | 4th & 5th place |
| Light Blue | 6th-10th place |
| Dark Blue | Finished (Outside Top 10) |
| Purple | Did not finish (Ret) |
| Red | Did not qualify (DNQ) |
| Brown | Withdrawn (Wth) |
| Black | Disqualified (DSQ) |
| White | Did not start (DNS) |
| Blank | Did not participate (DNP) |
| Blank | Not competing |

**In-line notation**
| **Bold** | Pole position |
| Italics | Ran fastest race lap |
| * | Led most race laps |
Rookie of the Year
Rookie

== See also ==
- 1934 Indianapolis 500
