= 1938 AAA Championship Car season =

Auto racing season

- AAA National Championship Trail

Season
- Races: 2
- Start date: May 30
- End date: September 10

Awards
- National champion: (United States) Floyd Roberts
- Indianapolis 500 winner: (United States) Floyd Roberts

The 1938 AAA Championship Car season consisted of two races, beginning in Speedway, Indiana on May 30 and concluding in Syracuse, New York on September 10. There were also two non-championship events. The AAA National Champion and Indianapolis 500 winner was Floyd Roberts.

Billy Winn died at Springfield during the non-championships race.

== Schedule and results ==
All races running on Dirt/Brick Oval. In IZOD IndyCar Series 2011 Historical Record Book, the Indianapolis Motor Speedway is, from 1911 to 1938, listed as a "brick track" type circuit. (page 73)

Rnd	Date	Race name	Track	Location	Type	Pole position	Winning driver
1	May 30	(United States) International 500 Mile Sweepstakes	Indianapolis Motor Speedway	Speedway, Indiana	Brick	(United States) Floyd Roberts	(United States) Floyd Roberts
NC	August 20	(United States) Springfield 100	Illinois State Fairgrounds	Springfield, Illinois	Dirt	(United States) Rex Mays	(United States) Tony Willman
NC	August 28	(United States) Milwaukee 100	Wisconsin State Fair Park Speedway	West Allis, Wisconsin	Dirt	(United States) Mauri Rose	(United States) Chet Gardner
2	September 10	(United States) Syracuse 100	New York State Fairgrounds	Syracuse, New York	Dirt	(United States) Jimmy Snyder	(United States) Jimmy Snyder

Non-championship race

== Final points standings ==
Note: Drivers had to be running at the finish to score points. Points scored by drivers sharing a ride were split according to percentage of race driven. Starters were not allowed to score points as relief drivers, if a race starter finished the race in another car, in a points scoring position, those points were awarded to the driver who had started the car.
The final standings based on reference.

Pos	Driver	INDY (United States)	SYR (United States)	Pts
1	(United States) Floyd Roberts	**1***	DNQ	1000
2	(United States) Wilbur Shaw	2		825
3	(United States) Chet Miller	3	DNQ	675
4	(United States) Ted Horn	4	4	660
5	(United States) Chet Gardner	5		450
6	(United States) Billy Devore	8	10	310
7	(United States) Duke Nalon	11	3	260
8	(United States) Joel Thorne	9	DNQ	225
9	(United States) Herb Ardinger	6		213
10	(United States) Jimmy Snyder	15*	**1***	200
11	(United States) Harry McQuinn	7		188.1
12	(United States) Frank Wearne	10	13	175
13	(United States) Rex Mays	28	2	165
14	(United States) Mauri Rose	13	5	90
15	(United States) George Connor	19	6	75
16	(United States) George Bailey	12		75
17	(United States) Floyd Davis	DNQ	7	65
18	(United States) Russ Snowberger	25	8	45.1
19	(United States) Tommy Hinnershitz RY		9	45
20	(United States) George Robson R		11	25
21	(United States) Bill Cummings	24	8	9.9
-	(United States) Kelly Petillo	22	12	0
-	(United States) Ronney Householder	14		0
-	(United States) Billy Winn	14		0
-	(United States) Frankie Bailey		14	0
-	(United States) Louis Meyer	16		0
-	(United States) Tony Gulotta	17		0
-	(United States) Al Miller	18	DNQ	0
-	(United States) Cliff Bergere	20		0
-	(United States) Henry Banks	21		0
-	(United States) Louis Tomei	23		0
-	(United States) Babe Stapp	26		0
-	(United States) Tony Willman	27	DNQ	0
-	(United States) Emil Andres	29	DNQ	0
-	(United States) Ira Hall	30		0
-	(United States) Frank Brisko	31	DNQ	0
-	(United States) Al Putnam	32		0
-	(United States) Shorty Cantlon	33	DNQ	0
-	(United States) Frankie Beeder	DNQ	DNQ	0
-	(United States) Johnny Sawyer	DNQ	DNQ	0
-	(United States) Charles Crawford	DNQ		0
-	(United States) Fred Frame	DNQ		0
-	(United States) Ralph Hepburn	DNQ		0
-	(United States) Deacon Litz	DNQ		0
-	(Kingdom of Italy) Tazio Nuvolari	DNQ		0
-	(United States) Jack Petticord	DNQ		0
-	(United States) Johnny Seymour	DNQ		0
-	(United States) Doc Williams	DNQ		0
-	(United States) Walt Brown		DNQ	0
-	(United States) Al Cusick		DNQ	0
-	(United States) Miny Dugatta		DNQ	0
-	(United Kingdom) Henry Guerand		DNQ	0
-	(United States) Bill Holland		DNQ	0
-	(United States) George Huss		DNQ	0
-	(United States) Doc Keim		DNQ	0
-	(United States) Hans Koehler		DNQ	0
-	(United States) Mark Light		DNQ	0
-	(United States) Jack Moon		DNQ	0
-	(United States) Leslie Owen		DNQ	0
-	(United States) Charlie Rogers		DNQ	0
-	(United States) Jack Russell		DNQ	0
-	(United States) Bud Walker		DNQ	0
-	(United States) Buster Warke		DNQ	0
-	(United States) Lou Webb		DNQ	0
Pos	Driver	INDY (United States)	SYR (United States)	Pts

Color	Result
Gold	Winner
Silver	2nd place
Bronze	3rd place
Green	4th & 5th place
Light Blue	6th-10th place
Dark Blue	Finished (Outside Top 10)
Purple	Did not finish (Ret)
Red	Did not qualify (DNQ)
Brown	Withdrawn (Wth)
Black	Disqualified (DSQ)
White	Did not start (DNS)
Blank	Did not participate (DNP)
Blank	Not competing

**In-line notation**
**Bold**	Pole position
Italics	Ran fastest race lap
*	Led most race laps
Rookie of the Year
Rookie

== See also ==
- 1938 Indianapolis 500
