= Ronney Householder =

American racing driver (1908–1972)

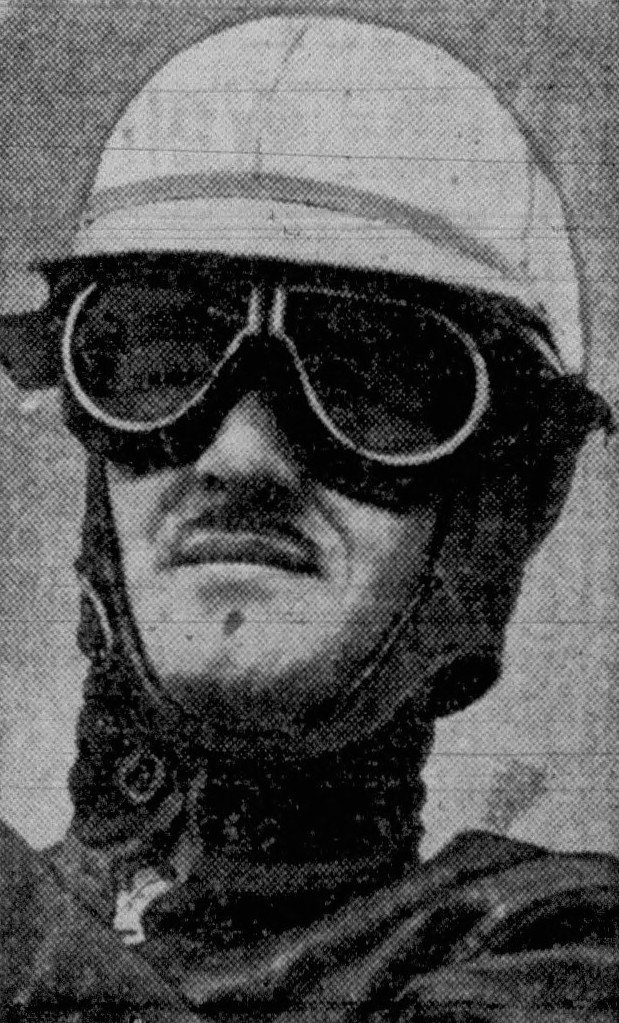
- Householder, circa 1941
- Born: Frederick Ronald Householder; May 9, 1908 Omaha, Nebraska, U.S.
- Died: November 11, 1972 (aged 64) Detroit, Michigan, U.S.

Champ Car career
- 3 races run over 4 years
- Best finish: 30th (1937)
- First race: 1937 Indianapolis 500 (Indianapolis)
- Last race: 1938 Indianapolis 500 (Indianapolis)
| Wins | Podiums | Poles |
|---|---|---|
| 0 | 0 | 0 |

Frederick Ronald Householder (May 9, 1908 – November 11, 1972) was an American racing driver. He raced most of the year, in the Midwest in summer and the West Coast in the winter.

== Racing career ==
Householder was the 1935 Detroit Coliseum midget champion. He won the 1936 and 1937 Turkey Night Grand Prix midget races at Gilmore Stadium in front of over 18,000 fans. The Chicago Shriners built a board track inside the football stadium Soldier Field in 1939. Householder won the track championship against the top drivers in the nation.

Householder raced in the 1937 and 1938 Indianapolis 500s, and finished twelfth and fourteenth respectively. He set a new qualifying record in 1938 at 125.769 mph. The record still stands, as the qualifying distance at the time was 10 laps.

== Later career ==
After his racing career was completed, Householder worked for Chrysler and Plymouth as a car designer, engineer, builder and development guru. Householder was one of the main members of Chrysler during the 1950s and 1960s. He died of cancer at the age of 64.

== Awards and honors ==
- Householder was inducted in the National Midget Auto Racing Hall of Fame in 1984.

== Motorsports career results ==
=== Indianapolis 500 results ===
| Year | Car | Start | Qual | Rank | Finish | Laps | Led | Retired |
|---|---|---|---|---|---|---|---|---|
| 1937 | 23 | 10 | 116.464 | 31 | 12 | 194 | 0 | Flagged |
| 1938 | 16 | 10 | 125.769 | 1 | 14 | 154 | 0 | Supercharger |
| Totals | | | | | | 348 | 0 | |

| Starts | 2 |
| Poles | 0 |
| Front Row | 0 |
| Wins | 0 |
| Top 5 | 0 |
| Top 10 | 0 |
| Retired | 1 |
