= Herb Ardinger =

American racing driver (1910–1973)

- Born: Herbert Allen Ardinger; April 25, 1910 Glassport, Pennsylvania, U.S.
- Died: June 14, 1973 (aged 63) Ann Arbor, Michigan, U.S.

Champ Car career
- 9 races run over 7 years
- Best finish: 9th (1938)
- First race: 1934 Indianapolis 500 (Indianapolis)
- Last race: 1947 Indianapolis 500 (Indianapolis)
Wins	Podiums	Poles
0	0	0

Herbert Allen Ardinger (April 25, 1910 – June 14, 1973) was an American racing driver.

== Biography ==
Ardinger competed in eight AAA Championship Car races from 1934 to 1939, including the 1934, 1936, 1937, and 1938 Indianapolis 500 races - he failed to qualify in 1935 when driving a factory-supported Ford entered by Lew Welch.

Ardinger finished sixth in the 1938 race in a front-drive Miller.

In 1947, Ardinger returned to the Speedway to serve as a replacement driver for Doc Williams in the Novi and finished a career-best fourth.

== Death ==
Ardinger died on June 14, 1973, in Ann Arbor, Michigan.

== Motorsports career results ==
=== Indianapolis 500 results ===
Year	Car	Start	Qual	Rank	Finish	Laps	Led	Retired
1934	24	14	111.722	22	10	200	0	Running
1936	44	6	115.082	15	28	38	0	Transmission
1937	54	3	121.983	5	22	106	2	Rod
1938	54	14	119.022	24	6	199	0	Flagged
1939	9	9	124.125	14	17	141	0	Clutch
1947	54	4	120.733	19	4	200	0	Running
Totals						884	2	

Starts	6
Poles	0
Front Row	1
Wins	0
Top 5	1
Top 10	3
Retired	3
