= Harry McQuinn =

American racing driver (1905–1986)

- Born: Harry Thomas McQuinn; December 13, 1905 Nineveh, Indiana, U.S.
- Died: January 1, 1986 (aged 80) Bloomington, Indiana, U.S.

Champ Car career
- 12 races run over 11 years
- Best finish: 11th (1938)
- First race: 1934 Indianapolis 500 (Indianapolis)
- Last race: 1948 Indianapolis 500 (Indianapolis)
Wins	Podiums	Poles
0	0	0

Harry Thomas McQuinn (December 13, 1905 – January 1, 1986 ) was an American racing driver active in the 1930s and 1940s.

== Racing career ==
Born in Nineveh, Indiana, McQuinn raced in a Bob Wilke/Leader Card-sponsored midget car owned by the Marchese Brothers from Milwaukee. He raced before the AAA named an official national champion.

McQuinn won 1938, 1939, and 1940 track championships at the 124th Field Artillery Armory in Chicago, the 1937 and 1938 Walsh Stadium track championships in St. Louis in 1937 and 1938, the 1938 Riverview track championship in Chicago, and the 1938 track title at the Milwaukee Mile. McQuinn won 61 feature races in 1938, which ranked him second behind Wally Zale. McQuinn raced in ten Indianapolis 500 races, with career-best seventh-place finishes in 1938 and 1941.

== Later life ==
After McQuinn retired, he was appointed the chief steward at Indianapolis, and the head of the Championship car division for AAA and USAC. He died in Bloomington, Indiana 19 days past his 80th birthday, before he could attend his induction in the National Midget Auto Racing Hall of Fame later that year.

== Motorsports career results ==
=== Indianapolis 500 results ===
Year	Car	Start	Qual	Rank	Finish	Laps	Led	Retired
1934	63	30	111.067	24	31	13	0	Rod
1935	66	18	111.111	31	33	4	0	Rod
1936	28	27	114.118	19	13	196	0	Out of gas
1937	47	22	121.822	7	29	47	0	Piston
1938	45	25	119.492	21	7	197	0	Flagged
1939	38	32	117.287	32	20	110	0	Ignition
1940	41	15	122.486	19	11	192	0	Flagged
1941	15	4	125.449	4	7	200	0	Running
1946	14	18	124.499	9	13	124	0	Out of oil
1948	65	26	122.154	31	33	1	0	Supercharger
Totals						1084	0	

Starts	10
Poles	0
Front Row	0
Wins	0
Top 5	0
Top 10	2
Retired	7
