= Charles Crawford (racing driver) =

American racing driver (1897–1958)

- Born: August 30, 1897 Nashville, Tennessee, U.S.
- Died: June 1, 1958 (aged 60) Calhoun, Georgia, U.S.

Champ Car career
- 1 race run over 3 years
- First race: 1934 Indianapolis 500 (Indianapolis)
Wins	Podiums	Poles
0	0	0

Charles Crawford (August 30, 1897 – June 1, 1958) was an American racing driver.

== Motorsports career results ==
=== Indianapolis 500 results ===
Year	Car	Start	Qual	Rank	Finish	Laps	Led	Retired
1934	49	28	108.784	30	13	110	0	In pits
Totals						110	0	

Starts	1
Poles	0
Front Row	0
Wins	0
Top 5	0
Top 10	0
Retired	1
