= Doc MacKenzie =

American racing driver (1906–1936)

- Born: George Daniel MacKenzie; July 16, 1906 Philadelphia, Pennsylvania, U.S.
- Died: August 23, 1936 (aged 30) West Allis, Wisconsin, U.S.

Championship titles
- AAA Eastern Big Car (1935)

Champ Car career
- 11 races run over 7 years
- Best finish: 4th (1936)
- First race: 1931 Syracuse 100 (Syracuse)
- Last race: 1936 Goshen 100 (Goshen)
Wins	Podiums	Poles
0	2	1

George Daniel "Doc" MacKenzie (July 16, 1906 – August 23, 1936) was an American racing driver. After being involved in and surviving a five-car crash during the 1936 Indianapolis 500, he was killed in a sprint car crash at the Milwaukee Mile in West Allis, Wisconsin the same year.

== Awards and honors ==
- He was inducted in the National Sprint Car Hall of Fame in 1994.

1935 Hankinson Circuit and AAA Eastern Champ. First ever to hold both titles.

== Motorsports career results ==
=== Indianapolis 500 results ===
Year	Car	Start	Qual	Rank	Finish	Laps	Led	Retired
1932	42	39	108.154	37	28	65	0	Engine
1933	51	39	108.073	40	18	192	0	Rear axle
1934	73	26	111.933	21	29	15	0	Crash NC
1935	8	15	114.294	20	9	200	0	Running
1936	10	4	116.961	5	3	200	0	Running
Totals						672	0	

Starts	5
Poles	0
Front Row	0
Wins	0
Top 5	1
Top 10	2
Retired	3
