= Bill Cummings (racing driver) =

American racing driver (1906–1939)

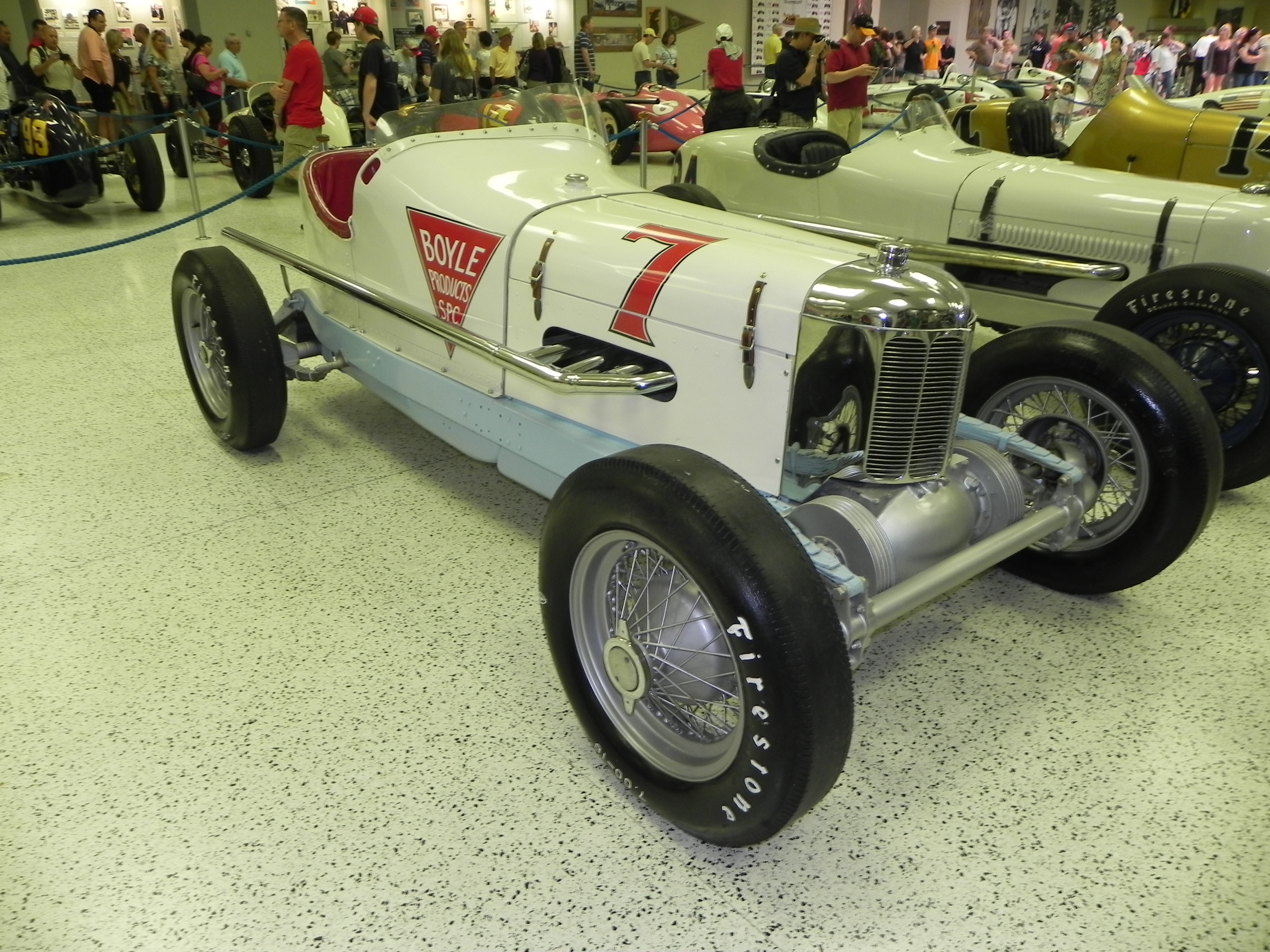
- Cummings' winning car from the 1934 Indianapolis 500
- Born: William Clarence Cummings; November 11, 1906 Indianapolis, Indiana, U.S.
- Died: February 8, 1939 (aged 32) Indianapolis, Indiana, U.S.

Championship titles
- AAA Championship Car (1934); Major victories Indianapolis 500 (1934)

Champ Car career
- 35 races run over 9 years
- Best finish: 1st (1934)
- First race: 1930 Langhorne 100 (Langhorne)
- Last race: 1938 Syracuse 100 (Syracuse)
- First win: 1930 Langhorne 100 (Langhorne)
- Last win: 1934 Indianapolis 500 (Indianapolis)
Wins	Podiums	Poles
6	15	10

William Clarence Cummings (November 11, 1906 – February 8, 1939), nicknamed "Wild Bill," was an American racing driver who is known for winning the 1934 Indianapolis 500.

== Death ==
Cummings was driving a passenger automobile on State Road 29 in Indianapolis, when he crashed through a guard rail, overturned several times and plunged 50 feet (15 m) into Lick Creek. He was pulled from the water by passers-by while still alive, but died at Methodist Hospital two days later.

== Awards and honors ==
Cummings has been inducted into the following halls of fame:

- Auto Racing Hall of Fame (1970)
- National Sprint Car Hall of Fame (2020)

== Motorsports career results ==
=== Indianapolis 500 results ===
Year	Car	Start	Qual	Rank	Finish	Laps	Led	Retired
1930	6	22	106.173	4	5	200	0	Running
1931	3	2	112.563	4	28	70	4	Oil line
1932	10	12	111.204	19	19	151	0	Crankshaft
1933	5	1	118.530	1	25	136	32	Radiator
1934	7	10	116.116	6	1	200	57	Running
1935	1	5	116.901	6	3	200	0	Running
1936	2	13	115.939	14	33	0	0	Clutch
1937	16	1	123.343	3	6	200	0	Running
1938	7	16	122.393	7	24	72	0	Radiator
Totals						1229	93	

Starts	9
Poles	2
Front Row	3
Wins	1
Top 5	3
Top 10	4
Retired	5

Preceded by Louis Meyer	Indianapolis 500 Winner; 1934	Succeeded by Kelly Petillo
