= Chet Gardner =

American racing driver (1898–1938)

- Born: Chester Leroy Gardner; March 16, 1898 Grant City, Missouri, U.S.
- Died: September 3, 1938 (aged 40) Flemington, New Jersey, U.S.

Championship titles
- AAA Midwest Big Car (1933)

Champ Car career
- 26 races run over 9 years
- Best finish: 4th (1933)
- First race: 1928 Detroit 100 (Detroit)
- Last race: 1938 Indianapolis 500 (Indianapolis)
Wins	Podiums	Poles
0	3	1

Chester Leroy Gardner (March 16, 1898 – September 3, 1938) was an American racing driver, named by promoters as "The Grand Old Man of Auto Racing."

Gardner was killed in an accident during a time trial at the Flemington Fair Speedway when he swerved to avoid a child that had run onto the racetrack.

== Racing career ==
Gardner started racing in 1922 in Colorado. In 1933, he won the Midwest AAA Sprint Car Championship. He was named "Southern Dirt Racing King" twice.

Between 1928 and 1938, Gardner made 25 starts in the AAA series, where his best result was third. From 1930 to 1938 he competed in the Indianapolis 500.

== Motorsports career results ==
=== Indianapolis 500 results ===
Year	Car	Start	Qual	Rank	Finish	Laps	Led	Retired
1930	18	5	105.811	7	38	1	0	Spun T1
1933	21	15	112.319	22	4	200	0	Running
1934	4	5	114.786	9	21	72	0	Rod
1935	18	9	114.556	17	7	200	0	Running
1936	6	18	116.000	12	29	38	0	Clutch
1937	31	9	117.342	28	11	199	0	Flagged
1938	38	18	120.435	17	5	200	0	Running
Totals						910	0	

Starts	7
Poles	0
Front Row	0
Wins	0
Top 5	2
Top 10	3
Retired	3

Ref.:
