= Billy Winn (racing driver) =

American racing driver (1909–1938)

- Born: James Murdock Winn; August 27, 1909 Weston, Missouri, U.S.
- Died: August 20, 1938 (aged 28) Springfield, Illinois, U.S.

Champ Car career
- 14 races run over 7 years
- Best finish: 5th (1935)
- First race: 1931 Indianapolis 500 (Indianapolis)
- Last race: 1937 Syracuse 100 (Syracuse)
- First win: 1934 Springfield 100 (Springfield)
- Last win: 1937 Syracuse 100 (Syracuse)
| Wins | Podiums | Poles |
|---|---|---|
| 4 | 6 | 2 |

James Murdock "Billy" Winn (August 27, 1909 – August 20, 1938) was an American racing driver.

== Racing career ==
Primarily a big car driver, Winn competed in four Indianapolis 500 races (1931, 1932, 1936, and 1937) and drove as a relief driver in 1933, 1934, 1935, and 1938. He also drove his single-gear sprint car in the 1936 and 1937 Vanderbilt Cup races, running near the front of both races but being sidelined by mechanical failure both years.

== Death ==
Winn was killed in a non-points paying AAA Championship Car event held at the Illinois State Fairgrounds on August 20, 1938, when tire failure caused Winn's Miller to overturn on the fourth lap of the 100-mile race.

== Awards and honors ==
Winn was inducted in the National Sprint Car Hall of Fame in 2003.

== Motorsports career results ==
=== Indianapolis 500 results ===
| Year | Car | Start | Qual | Rank | Finish | Laps | Led | Retired |
|---|---|---|---|---|---|---|---|---|
| 1931 | 55 | 36 | 105.405 | 27 | 21 | 138 | 0 | Flagged |
| 1932 | 2 | 9 | 111.801 | 15 | 9 | 200 | 0 | Running |
| 1936 | 5 | 19 | 114.648 | 16 | 25 | 78 | 0 | Crankshaft |
| 1937 | 10 | 4 | 119.922 | 11 | 26 | 85 | 0 | Oil line |
| Totals | | | | | | 501 | 0 | |

| Starts | 4 |
| Poles | 0 |
| Front Row | 0 |
| Wins | 0 |
| Top 5 | 0 |
| Top 10 | 1 |
| Retired | 2 |
