= Johnny Sawyer =

American racing driver (1902–1989)

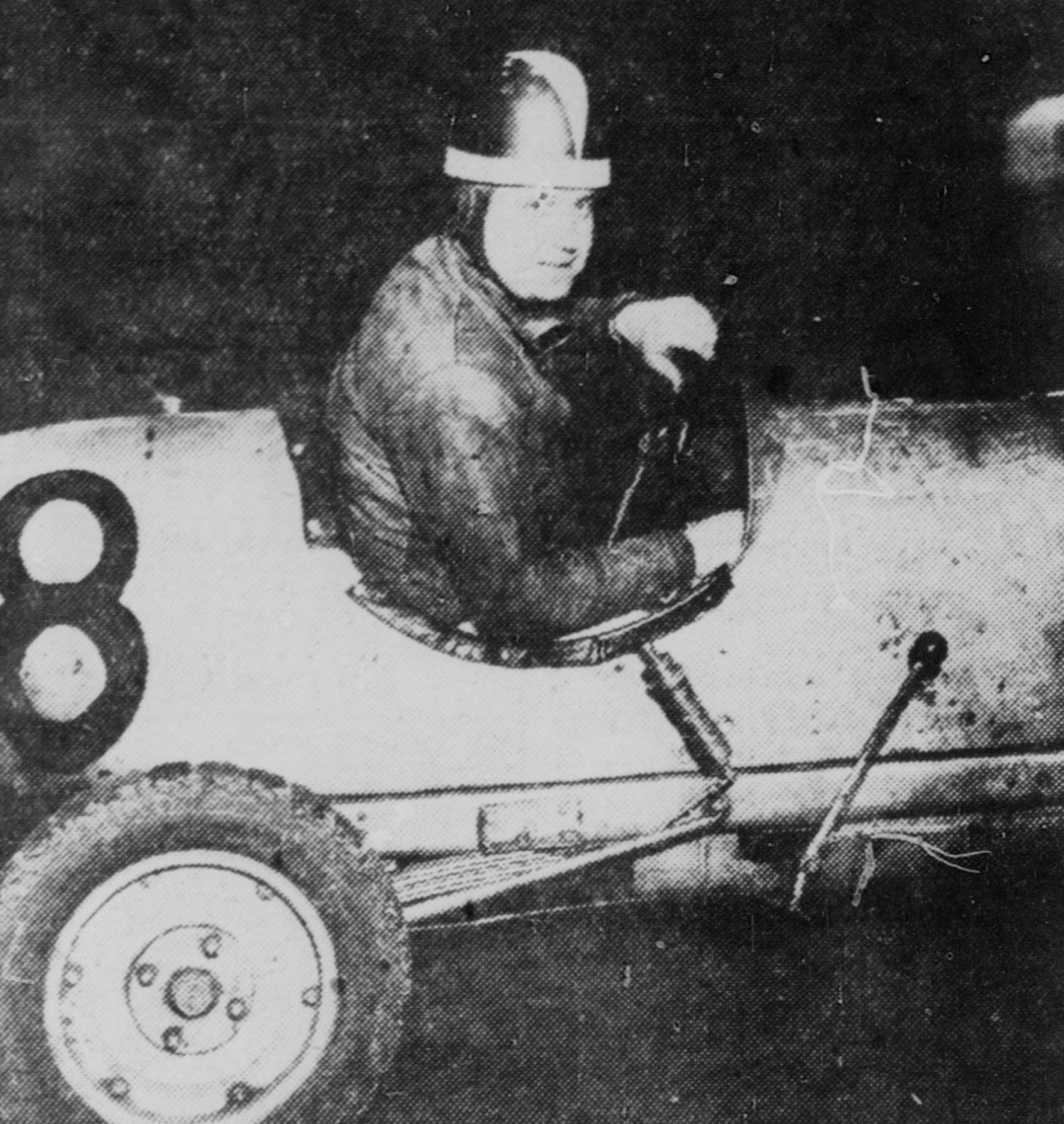
- Sawyer, circa 1935
- Born: John Goldie Sawyer; June 7, 1902 Green Bay, Wisconsin, U.S.
- Died: June 17, 1989 (aged 87) Milwaukee, Wisconsin, U.S.

Champ Car career
- 8 races run over 4 years
- Best finish: 23rd (1935)
- First race: 1933 Indianapolis 500 (Indianapolis)
- Last race: 1935 Syracuse 100 (Syracuse)
Wins	Podiums	Poles
0	0	0

John Goldie Sawyer (June 7, 1902 – June 17, 1989) was an American racing driver.

== Motorsports career results ==
=== Indianapolis 500 results ===
Year	Car	Start	Qual	Rank	Finish	Laps	Led	Retired
1933	53	34	110.590	28	31	77	0	Clutch
1934	41	21	109.808	27	25	27	0	Rod
Totals						104	0	

Starts	2
Poles	0
Front Row	0
Wins	0
Top 5	0
Top 10	0
Retired	2
