= American open-wheel car racing =

Category of professional-level automobile racing in North America

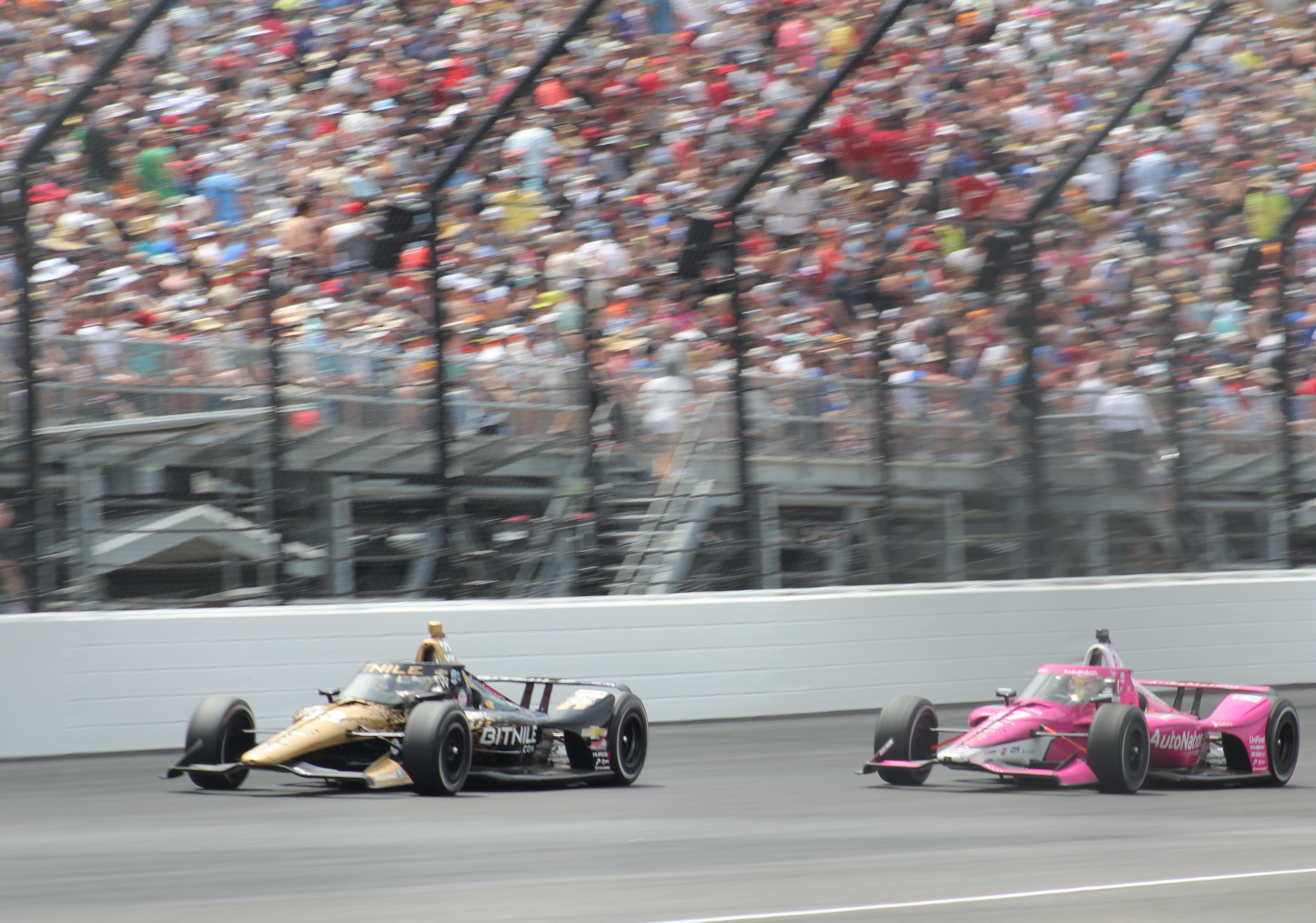
- The 2023 Indianapolis 500, an IndyCar sanctioned race
- Highest governing body: AAA Contest Board (1905–1955); USAC (1956–1997); CART (1979–2003); Champ Car (2004–2008); IndyCar (1996–present)

Characteristics
- Contact: Yes
- Team members: Yes
- Mixed-sex: Yes
- Type: Outdoor
- Venue: Various

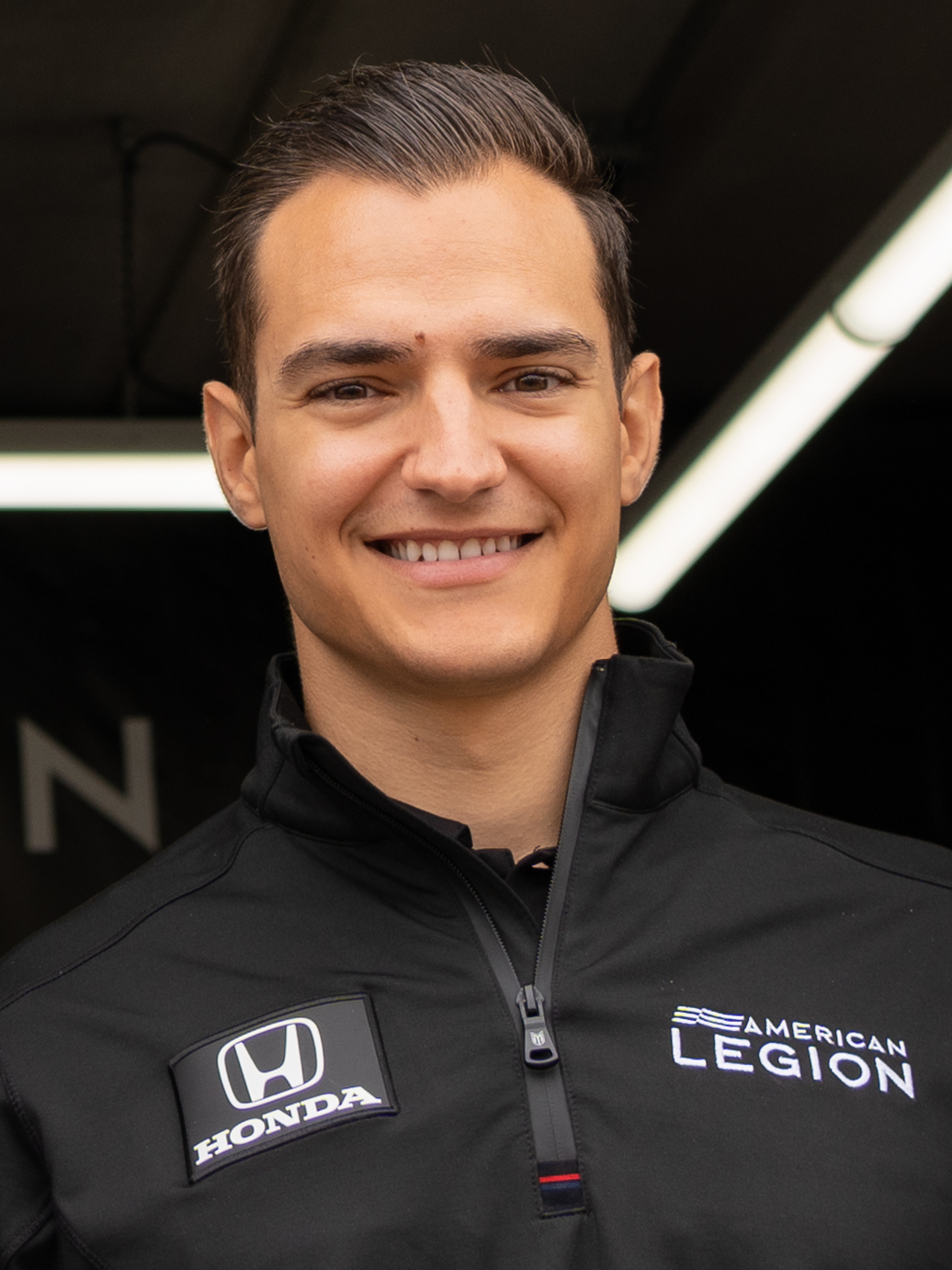
Álex Palou, 2026 IndyCar Series Champion

American open-wheel car racing, also known as Indy car racing, is a category of professional automobile racing in the United States. As of 2026, the top-level American open-wheel racing championship is the IndyCar Series, which is sanctioned by IndyCar, LLC. Competitive events for professional-level, open-wheel race cars have been conducted under the auspices of various sanctioning bodies, and trace their roots as far back as 1902. A season-long, points-based, National Championship of drivers has been officially recognized in 1905, 1916, and each year since 1920 (except for a hiatus during World War II). As such, for many years, this discipline of motorsports was known as championship car racing (or champ car racing for short). That name has fallen from use, and the term Indy Car racing (derived from the Indy 500) has become the preferred moniker.

The machines, typically referred to as "Indy Cars", are a formula of single-seat, open cockpit, open-wheel, purpose-built race cars. They compete on a variety of circuits, including ovals, road courses, street circuits, and combined road courses. The most famous and most important event of the season is the Indianapolis 500, held at the Indianapolis Motor Speedway during Memorial Day weekend in late May. Over the decades, Indy Cars have been generally similar to those over in Formula One, though there are important differences. Though the IndyCar Series is American-based, international races have occasionally been held, in such places as Canada, Mexico, Brazil, Japan, and Australia, as well as Europe.

This form of racing experienced considerable growth and popularity in the decades after World War II. The "Golden Era" of the front-engined roadsters was followed by a decade of innovation and transition in the 1960s. By the late-1960s and early-1970s, the cars had rapidly evolved to rear-engined, formula-style machines. Speeds climbed on the superspeedways to over 200 miles per hour (320 km/h), while international participation also increased. The sport saw much success, exposure, and popularity particularly during the 1980s–1990s under the sanctioning of Championship Auto Racing Teams (CART). Organizational disputes in 1979 and 1996 split participants and the fanbase among two separate competing series. The sport was re-unified in 2008, and in late 2019, IndyCar and the Indianapolis Motor Speedway were bought by Roger Penske and Penske Entertainment.

== Sanctioning bodies ==
=== AAA (1902–1955) ===
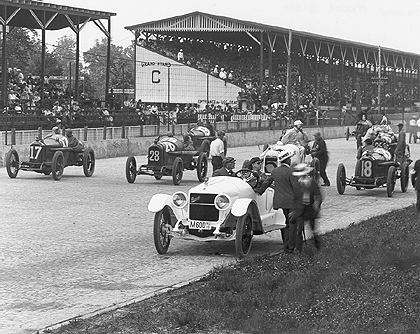
Field of 1916 Indianapolis 500, first Indianapolis 500 held as a part of National Championship

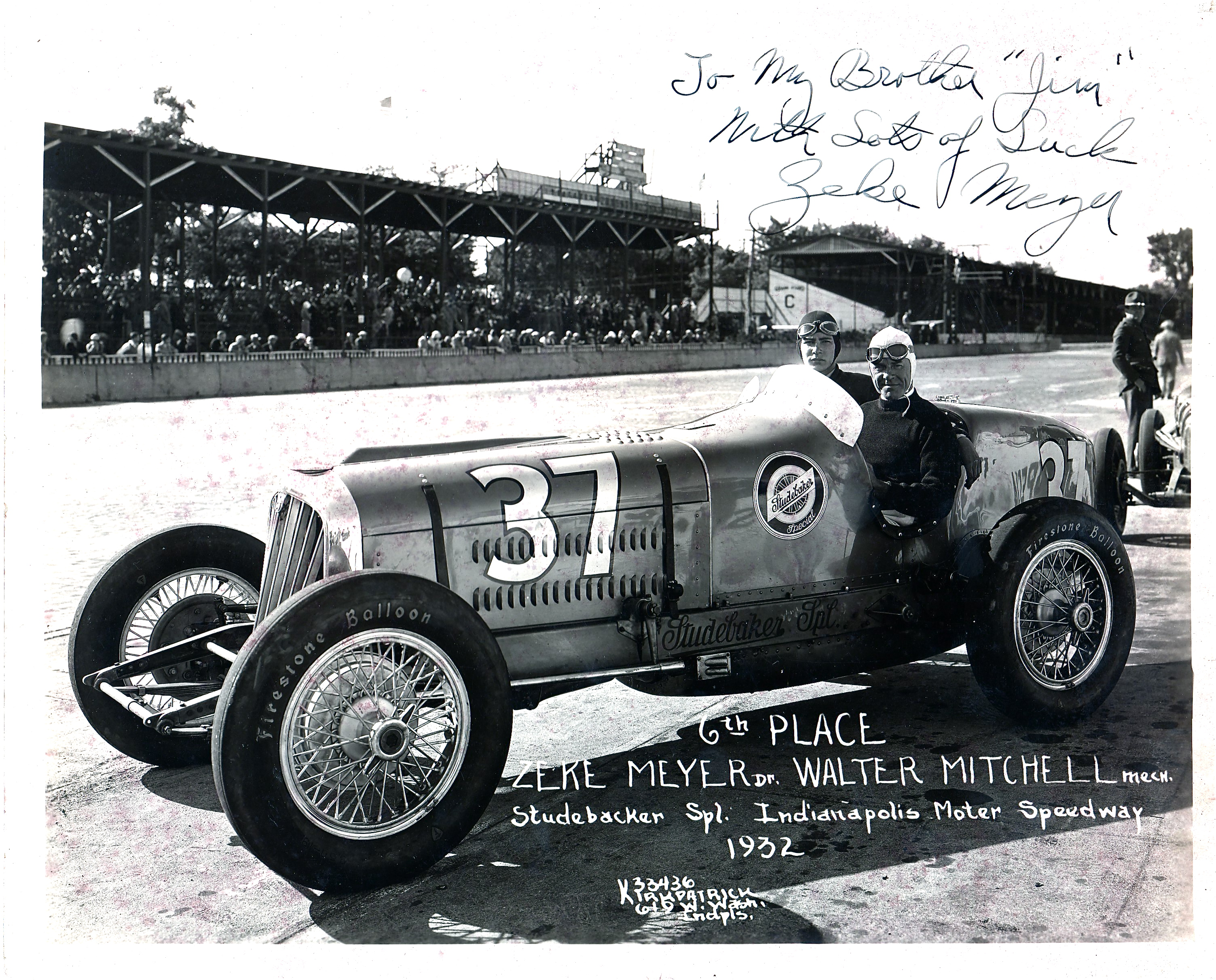
Zeke Meyer at 1932 Indianapolis 500

The national championship was sanctioned by the Contest Board of the American Automobile Association (AAA). The AAA first sanctioned automobile motorsports events in 1902. At first it used the rules of the Automobile Club of America (ACA), but it formed its own rules in 1903. It introduced the first track season championship for racing cars in 1905. Barney Oldfield was the first champion. No official season championship was recognized from 1906 to 1915, however, many races were held. Official records regard 1916 as the next contested championship season. Years later, retroactive titles were named back to 1902. These post factum seasons (1902–1904, 1906–1915, and 1917–1919) are considered unofficial and revisionist history by accredited historians.

Racing did not cease in the United States during WWI, but the official national championship was suspended. The Indianapolis 500 itself was voluntarily suspended for 1917–1918 due to the war. In 1920, the championship officially resumed, and despite the difficult economic climate that would later follow, ran continuously throughout the Depression. Shortly after the attack on Pearl Harbor, all auto racing was suspended during World War II. From 1942 to 1945 no events were contested, banned by the U.S. government primarily on account of rationing. Racing resumed in full in 1946. The 1946 season is unique, in that it included six Champ Car events, and 71 "Big Car" races, as organizers were initially unsure about the availability of cars and participation.

AAA ceased participation in auto racing at the end of the 1955 season. It cited a series of high-profile fatal accidents, namely Bill Vukovich during the 1955 Indianapolis 500, and the 1955 Le Mans disaster.

Through 1922 and again from 1930 to 1937, it was commonplace for the cars to be two-seaters, as opposed to the aforementioned standard single-seat form. The driver would be accompanied by a riding mechanic (or "mechanician").

=== USAC (1956–1978) ===
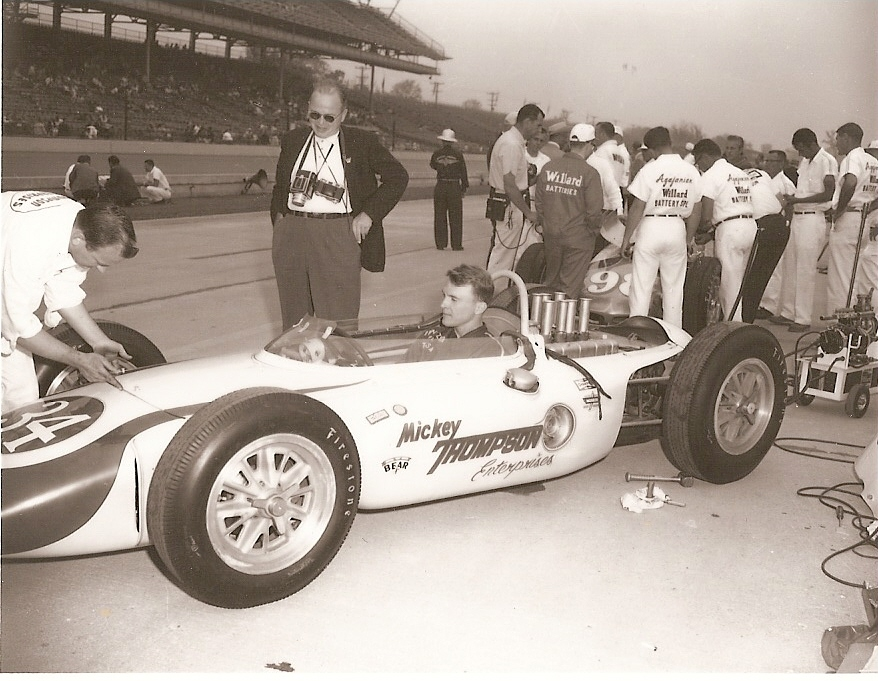
Dan Gurney at 1962 Indianapolis 500

The national championship was taken over by the United States Auto Club (USAC), a new sanctioning body formed by the then-owner of the Indianapolis Motor Speedway, Tony Hulman. Championship racing continued to grow in popularity in a stabilized environment for over two decades, with the two traditional disciplines of paved oval tracks and dirt oval tracks. During the 1950s, front-engined "roadsters" became the dominant cars on the paved oval tracks, while "upright" Champ Dirt Cars continued to dominate on dirt tracks. In the 1960s, drivers and team owners with road racing backgrounds, both American and foreign, began creeping into the series and the paved oval track cars evolved from front-engine "roadsters" to rear-engine formula-style racers. Technology, speed, and expense climbed at a rapid rate. The schedule continued to be dominated by oval tracks, but a few road course races were added to assuage the newcomers. Dirt tracks were dropped from the national championship after 1970.

Some teams raced and won both in F1 and in the US in the 1960s or 1970s, like Team Lotus, McLaren, Team Penske, All American Racers. In 1970s Europe, the British F1 chassis makers formed the Formula One Constructors' Association to represent the interests of their privately owned teams – usually against race organisers, later against factory-backed teams and FIA/FISA, which led to a FISA–FOCA war with boycotts etc. that was ended by a 1981 Concorde Agreement that made F1 a success story ever since.

During the 1970s, the increasing costs began to drive some of the traditional USAC car owners out of the sport. The dominant teams became Penske, Patrick, Gurney, and McLaren, all run by people with road racing backgrounds. There was a growing dissent between these teams and USAC management. Events outside Indianapolis were suffering from low attendance, and poor promotion. The Indy 500 was televised on a same day tape delayed basis on ABC, however, most of the other races had little or no coverage on television.

Towards the end of the 1970s, the growing dissent prompted several USAC car owners to consider creating a new sanctioning body to conduct the races. Meanwhile, two events had a concomitant effect on the situation. Tony Hulman, president of the Indianapolis Motor Speedway and founder of USAC, died in the fall of 1977. A few months later, eight key USAC officials were killed in a plane crash. By the end of 1978, the owners had broken away and founded Championship Auto Racing Teams (CART) to wrest control of North American single seater Championship racing away from USAC.

=== CART & USAC (1979–1981): First open-wheel "split" ===
Championship Auto Racing Teams (CART) was formed by most of the existing team owners, with some initial assistance from the SCCA (in order to be recognized by ACCUS). Therefore, there were two national championships run each by USAC and CART. The Indianapolis 500 remained under USAC sanction. The top teams allied to CART, and the CART championship quickly became the more prestigious national championship. USAC ran a "rump" 1979 season, with few big name drivers — the only exception being A. J. Foyt. In 1979, USAC denied several of the entries from the CART teams at the 1979 Indianapolis 500. The controversy saw a court injunction during the month, which allowed the CART-affiliated entrants to participate.

In 1980 USAC and CART jointly formed the Championship Racing League (CRL) to jointly run the national championship, but IMS management disliked the idea. USAC pulled out of the CRL arrangement in July. CART continued with the schedule for the remainder of the season. Both CART and USAC awarded separate national championship titles that year, and Johnny Rutherford happened to win both.

In 1981–1982, the Indianapolis 500 remained sanctioned by USAC. The preeminent national championship was now the one being sanctioned by CART. The Indy 500 field would consist largely of CART teams, as well as numerous independent, "Indy-only" teams. Indianapolis was not included as a points-paying round of the CART national championship. In addition, by that time USAC had designated Indianapolis an "invitational" race, offering entries only to invited teams. That moved in part to prevent the uproar over denied entries which occurred in 1979. One further race in 1981 was run by USAC at Pocono. This race was not supported by many CART teams, and featured a mixed field filled out by converted dirt track cars. USAC soon stopped sanctioning championship races outside the Indianapolis 500.

=== CART & USAC (1982–1995) ===
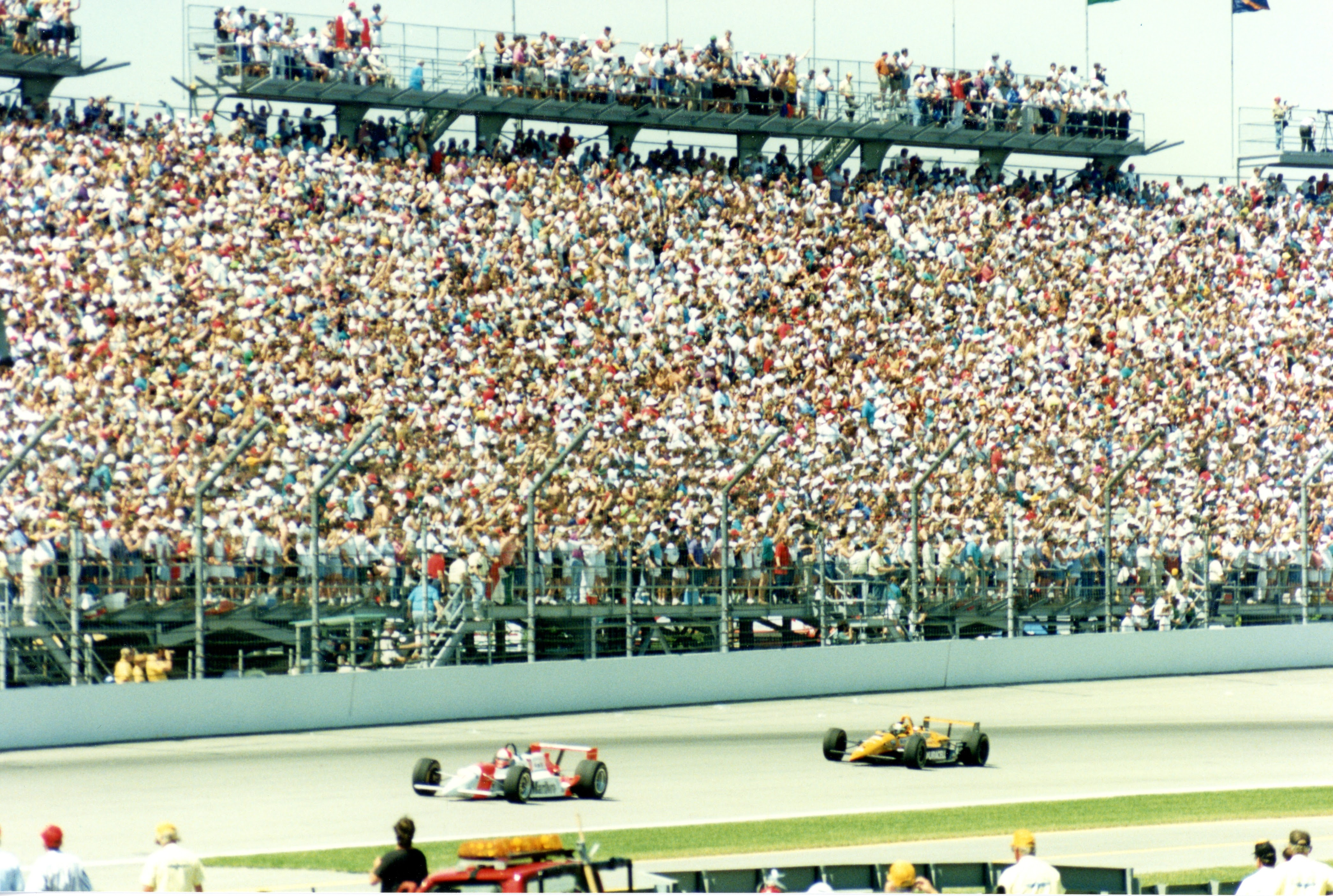
Al Unser Jr. and Raul Boesel at the 1994 Indianapolis 500, a USAC sanctioned race

Stability returned and the national championship was now run by CART full-time. The Indianapolis 500 was sanctioned singly by USAC, but points were paid towards the CART season championship. The cars and engines used in the CART races and USAC-sanctioned Indy 500 were the same, with only relatively minor rules differences. The Indy 500 field would consist of the CART regulars, and numerous one-off ("Indy only") entries. On occasion, some of the "Indy only" entries also elected to participate in the Michigan 500 and Pocono 500 (both sanctioned by CART) given the increased stature and exposure of those two events.

One of the more noticeable rule differences by USAC was allowing "stock block" engines a higher level of turbocharger boost. While most full-time CART-based teams utilized their V-8 quadcam engines at Indy, some of the smaller and "Indy only" teams elected to run stock block engines at Indy, attracted by the boost rules.

USAC's Gold Crown Championship continued, settling into an unusual June through May schedule calendar. This provided that the Indianapolis 500 would be the final race of the respective season. However, between the 1984–85 season and the 1994–95 season (its final season), the USAC Gold Crown Championship only had one points-paying race: the Indianapolis 500. As a result, during that timespan, the winner of the Indy 500 would win that year's USAC Gold Crown Championship by default.

=== CART & IRL (1996–2003): Second open-wheel "split" ===
In 1994, Tony Hulman's grandson, Tony George, president of the Indianapolis Motor Speedway, founded the Indy Racing League (IRL), to begin competition in 1996. It would exist as a separate championship, and leveraged the fame of the Indianapolis 500, which was placed as its centerpiece. After the IRL announced that 25 teams that competed in IRL races would get automatic qualifications to the race, making it impossible for the majority of the CART field to make the race, CART teams boycotted the 1996 Indy 500. It was the beginning of the second open-wheel "split". Initially, USAC sanctioned the IRL, however after officiating controversies in 1997 at Indianapolis and Texas, USAC was replaced by the IRL's in-house officiating.

CART, which had been licensing the trademarked "IndyCar" name for several seasons, subsequently entered into a legal battle with the Indianapolis Motor Speedway (the trademark owner) over the use of the moniker. Eventually a settlement was reached in which CART gave up use of the name, but the IRL in turn could not use it until 2003. CART rebranded themselves with the CART name, and began referring to their machines as Champ Cars.

CART's existing national championship remained dominant after the split for some time, initially retaining the top drivers, teams, and sponsors. However, in 2000, CART teams began to return to the Indy 500, eventually defecting permanently to the IRL. For 2003, it lost title sponsor FedEx and engine providers Honda and Toyota to the IRL.

=== IRL IndyCar Series & Champ Car World Series (2004–2007) ===
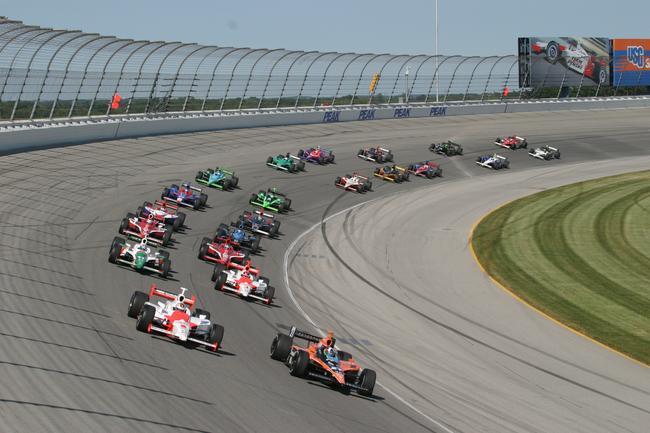
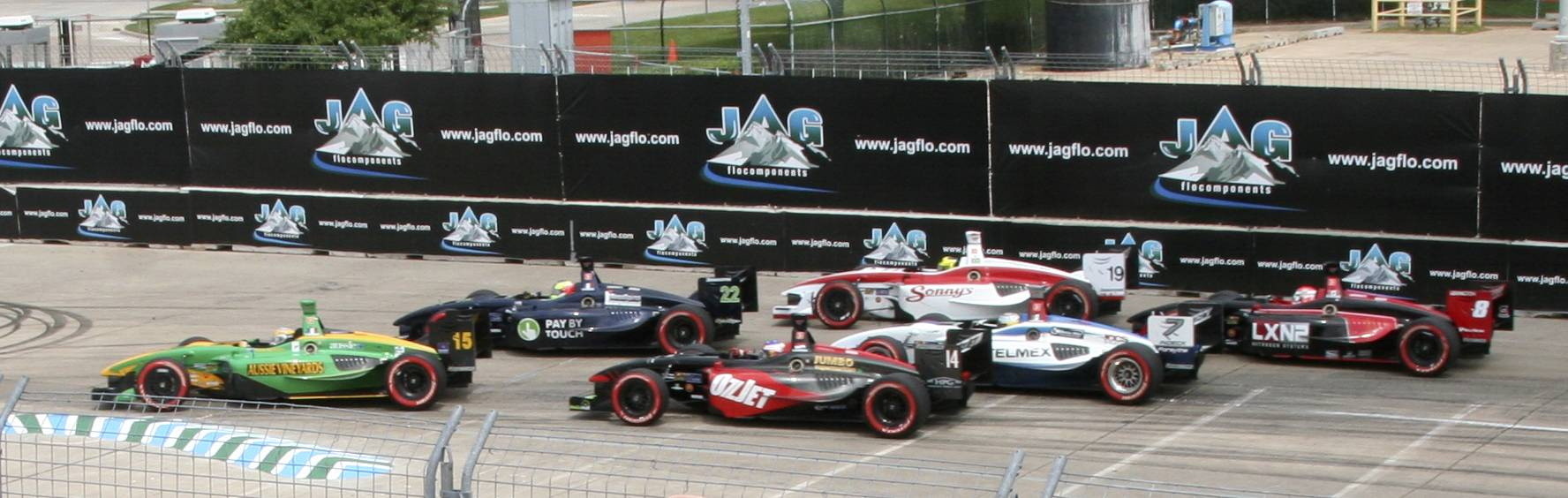
IRL IndyCar Series race at Chicagoland Speedway (left). Champ Car World Series race at JAGFlo Speedway at Reliant Park (right) in 2007.

After steadily losing teams and drivers, sponsors, and manufacturers, and after a series of major financial setbacks, CART filed for bankruptcy in 2003. The assets were purchased by a consortium called Open Wheel Racing Series (OWRS) in 2004 and the series was renamed the Champ Car Open Wheel Racing Series, later renaming it to the Champ Car World Series. However, the sanctioning body continued to be plagued by financial difficulties, In 2007, CCWS's presenting sponsors Bridgestone and Ford Motor Company withdrew.

During this time, the IRL was now operating under the moniker IndyCar Series, and slowly beginning to establish itself as the more preeminent national championship series. In 2005, the IRL added road and street courses, and began picking up several former CART venues. And in 2007, Champ Car raced in Europe for the first time since 2003, with races in The Netherlands and Belgium. The entire 2007 Champ Car series schedule taking place entirely on road and street courses, the only season in the combined history of all major American open-wheel racing series not to feature any ovals its schedule. Champ Car had planned to add a round at the Circuito de Jerez in Spain for 2008 but this was scrapped following the reunification of American open-wheel racing that year.

=== IndyCar (2008–2019): Unification era ===
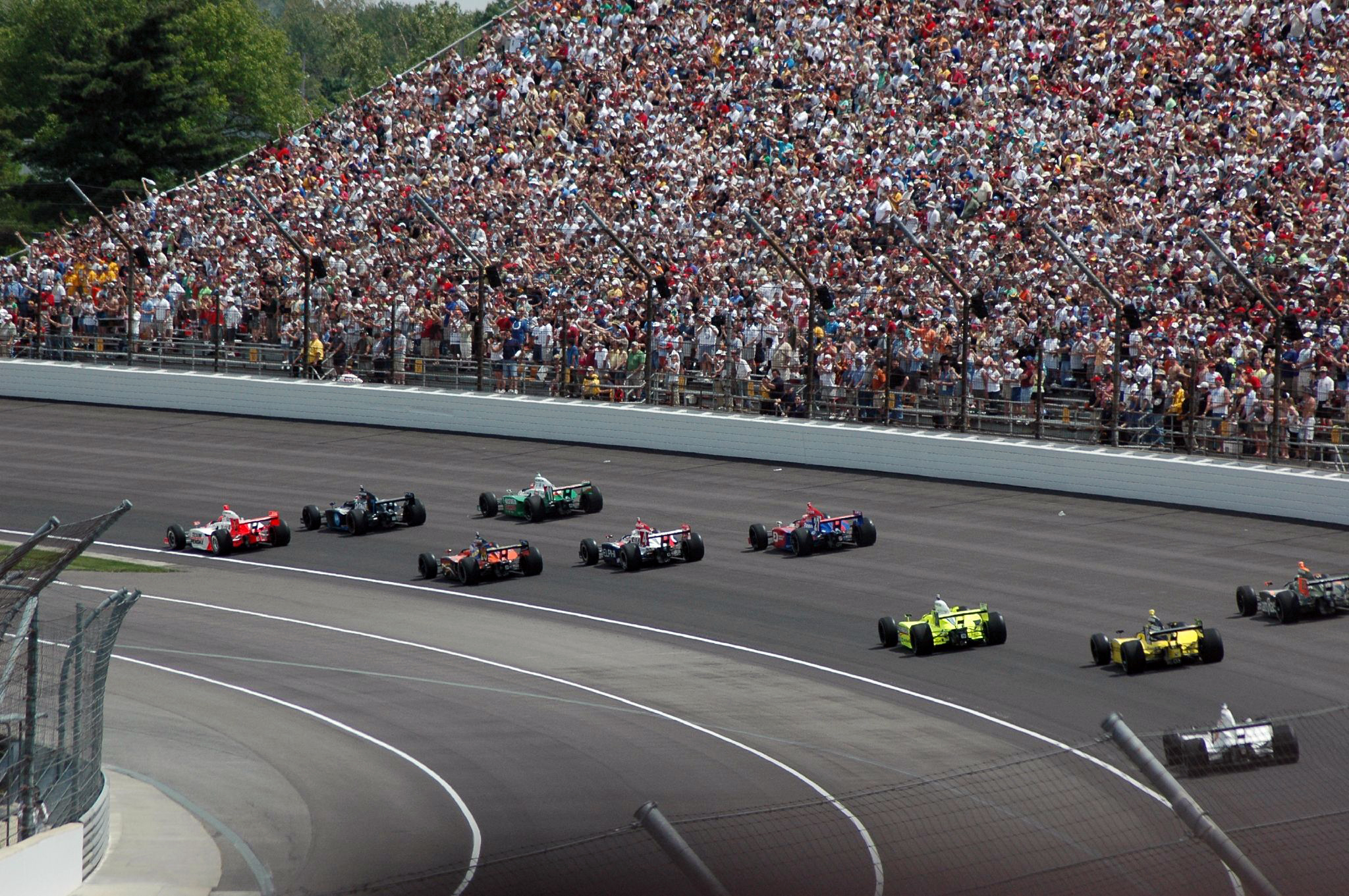
2008 Indianapolis 500, first Indianapolis 500 race in unification era

Prior to the start of the 2008 season, the CCWS Board authorized bankruptcy and Champ Car was absorbed into the IRL, creating a unified series for the national championship for the first time since 1978. The unified series competed under the name IndyCar Series. The two calendars were merged into one schedule, with the top Champ Car races such as Long Beach (which was a CCWS-sanctioned event with IRL points before being an official round of the IRL in 2009), Edmonton and Surfers Paradise in Australia surviving, later being replaced with an A1GP event in 2009 that never happened before the focus was changed to the Australian Supercars Championship in 2010. Some of the other races from the Champ Car schedule were dropped or put on hiatus for a few seasons. All historical record and property of CART/CCWS was assumed by the IRL.

Randy Bernard was announced as the new IRL CEO in February 2010. In 2011, the sanctioning body dropped the Indy Racing League name, becoming IndyCar to reflect the merged series. The new Dallara DW12 racecar was introduced for the 2012 season. Bernard was replaced by Mark Miles in 2012. The series operated under the name IZOD IndyCar Series from 2010 to 2013, then became known as the Verizon IndyCar Series from 2014 to 2018, and the NTT IndyCar Series since 2019.

=== IndyCar (2020–present): Penske era ===
In 2020, the IndyCar Series, as well as the Indianapolis Motor Speedway and other holdings, was sold to Penske Entertainment Corp., a subsidiary of the Penske Corporation, owned by Roger Penske.

== Car names and trademarks ==
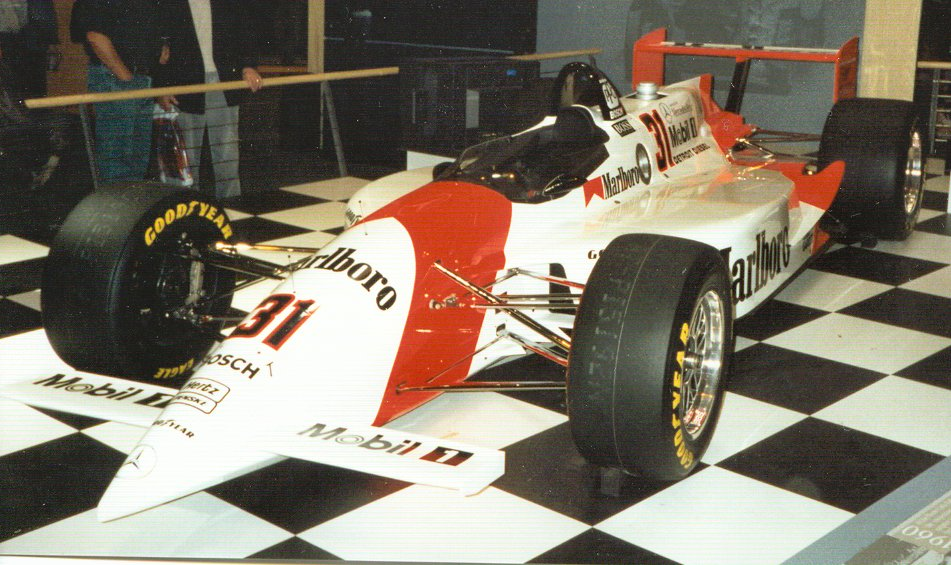
Marlboro Penske PC-23 Indy/Champ car

The race cars participating in national championship events have been referred to by various names. Early nomenclature was to call the machines "Championship Cars", which was later shortened to "Champ Cars". This was a simple, yet descriptive term, which positively identified the machines as those that competed for the National Championship. The term "Big Cars" saw some limited use; a term that identified the machines as larger and faster than junior formulae such as sprints and midgets. That term disappeared from use and was instead largely used for sprint cars. However, some promoters continued to advertise their championship events with the term "Big Cars", which leads to some inconsistencies. In the post–World War II era, the term "Speedway Cars" saw limited use; a loosely descriptive term, distinguishing the machines as those driven at the Indianapolis Motor Speedway and other major speedways, as opposed to those driven at smaller tracks, for instance. Nevertheless, the term "Championship/Champ Cars" prevailed as the preferred moniker.

In most years since the USAC era, the term "Indy cars" (after the Indy 500) has taken over as the preferred moniker. Apropos to that, when CART was founded in 1979, its acronym stood for Championship Auto Racing Teams, a reflection of the historical use of the term "Championship Car". From its onset, CART started marketing itself with the two-word "Indy Car" term, advertising itself as the "CART Indy Car World Series".

Through the mid-1990s, the term "Indy car" referred to machines used to compete in events sanctioned by CART, as well as the machines competing in the Indianapolis 500 (sanctioned singly by USAC).

In 1992, the CamelCase term "IndyCar" was trademarked by IMS, Inc. It was licensed to CART from 1992 through 1996. After the inception of the Indy Racing League in 1996, the terms of the contract were voided after a lawsuit. As part of the settlement, the term was shelved by a six-year non-use agreement. Following the settlement, and the lack of connection to the Indy 500, CART decided to revert to the former term. It re-assumed the name CART, and the machines would be referred to again as "Champ cars". This continued after CART was reorganized into CCWS.

Complicating the situation resulting from the open-wheel split, CART/Champ Car races held outside the United States were still permitted to use the Indy moniker (e.g., Molson Indy Toronto and Lexmark Indy 300). Foreign venue promoters took advantage of the marketing power of the Indy 500 name for their events, even though the Champ Car series they were promoting no longer had any ties to that race. The exceptions created confusion, and Champ Car gradually phased out the usage to distance itself further from the IRL.

After the settlement expired in 2003, the term IndyCar was brought back. The Indy Racing League was re-branded as the "IRL IndyCar Series". The machines in the series were also referred to as "Indy cars". Despite the official acknowledgment, media and fans alike would continue to use the term "IRL" to describe the series, and to a lesser extent, "IRL cars" to describe the machines. Removing the "IRL" term from use proved difficult.

With two series (IndyCar and Champ Car) still competing in parallel, the umbrella terms "Open Wheel Cars" and "Open Wheel Racing" saw increased use during the split and post-split era. Many drivers had logged starts in both series at one time or another during their careers. The term was used as a way to combine a driver's career accomplishments without being series/machine specific. It also served to link the lineage of events, teams, drivers, etc., even as they switched sanctioning bodies.

In 2008, when Champ Car World Series was merged into the Indy Racing League, the term "Champ Car" was permanently retired. The unified racing series fell under the "IndyCar" name, and the machines would be known as "Indy cars". On January 1, 2011, the names "Indy Racing League" and "IRL" were officially retired. The sanction body was re-branded as INDYCAR LLC, and the premier touring series was named the IndyCar Series (currently known as the NTT IndyCar Series for sponsorship reasons).

== Comparison with Formula One ==
At first, American and European open-wheel racing were not distinct disciplines. Races on both continents were mostly point-to-point races, and large ovals tracks emerged on both continents. But in America, racing took off at horse-race tracks and at the Indianapolis Motor Speedway, while in Europe, racing from point to point and around large circuits gained in popularity. Grand Prix racing (which became Formula One) and rallying then diverged in Europe. In two different periods, the race was part of FIA World Championships; between 1925 and 1928, the World Manufacturers' Championship and between 1950 and 1960, the World Drivers' Championship.

In the 1960s, road racing gained popularity in North America, and Formula One-style design ideas changed IndyCars, which until then had all been classic-styled front-engined roadsters. When North America's road racing championship, Can-Am Challenge, collapsed in the 1970s, the IndyCars were ready to fill the void. IndyCar was a combination road- and oval-racing championship from this time until the Split. Compared to F1 cars, IndyCars were partly specialized for oval-racing: they were larger and had other safety features, and were designed to run at the higher speeds necessary for oval racing. Because IndyCars were usually "customer" cars that the teams purchased from constructors, and because of rules to contain costs, they were considerably less expensive than F1 cars, each model of which was designed by the team that used it. After the Split in the 1990s, CART maintained the old formula while the IRL drifted toward the "spec" design that has been the only IndyCar model since 2003 (which changed in 2012, with specialized aero kits available from 2015 to 2017).

Over the years, changes in engine formulas and technological advancements have caused F1 cars and IndyCars to surpass each other in power at different times. In the foreseeable future, however, F1 cars are expected to deliver significantly more power than the spec IndyCar.

Alex Zanardi, who drove both in F1 and CART, said that the lighter, naturally aspirated F1 car was more responsive and accelerated off the turns faster, while the turbocharged CART car was more stable and accelerated to top speed faster.

More recently Formula 2 drivers Callum Ilott and Christian Lundgaard, who are both also test and reserve drivers for Alpine F1 and Scuderia Ferrari respectively, have stated that the modern Dallara DW12 spec car used in the IndyCar Series sits in between a Formula 2 and a Formula One car on road and street courses in terms of performance. Both Ilott and Lundgaard have stated that the IndyCar's lack of power steering combined with the lower downforce levels and roughly 100 horsepower advantage make the IndyCar harder to drive than a Formula 2 car. Both noted however that around a road or street course the Formula One car would be significantly faster than an IndyCar.

There is debate on which series is more demanding. Some point out that champions that retired from F1 have won CART championships: e.g., Emerson Fittipaldi and Nigel Mansell. Drivers who did not excel in F1 have continued their careers in IndyCar with varying levels of success. Some successful IndyCar drivers have tried but failed to get a seat in even a low level Formula One team. A handful of notable IndyCar drivers, however, found subsequent success in F1, including Mario Andretti and Jacques Villeneuve, who became Formula One champions, and Juan Pablo Montoya, who won several F1 races. Conversely, some point to the different track designs of IndyCar (see below) as a bigger challenge to the drivers. Former Haas F1 driver Romain Grosjean stated in 2021 that a modern IndyCar is more physically exerting to drive than a modern Formula One car but that the Formula One car was more mentally taxing due to all its additional complexity, horsepower, and downforce levels compared to the IndyCar as well as the need to manage fuel levels given that Formula One cars do not refuel during the race while IndyCar racing allows refueling during races.

=== Open-wheel cars ===
- "Indy car" is a generic name for championship open-wheel auto racing in the United States. "Indy car" initially described an open-wheel car that participated in the Indianapolis 500-Mile Race. Originally, the cars were generally referred to as "Championship cars". However, as the result of the Indianapolis being the most notable race on the calendar, many people started to apply the "Indy car" designation for the entire American open-wheel class of cars in order to differentiate those from other types of open-wheel cars, such as those used in Formula One.
- In general, IndyCars of both CART and IndyCar are slower on street and road courses, being less expensive and technology-centric platforms than their Formula One counterparts. This was even the case during the CART PPG era during the mid to late 1990s. With the bid to keep costs down around teams in IndyCar, a competitive Indy car team like Newman/Haas Racing operated on approximately US$20 Million per season, while the McLaren-Mercedes F1 team had an annual budget of US$400 million in 2008. With the budget cap in Formula One which was introduced in 2021, a team now can spend a maximum of US$145 Million on developing their car.
- The Formula One chassis was required to be built by their respective team/constructor since 1981, whereas an Indy car chassis could be purchased. The dominance of a select few manufacturers has essentially turned the IndyCar Series into a spec series. CART/CCWS became a spec series more intentionally for cost savings purposes.

=== Racing description ===
- Indy car racing historically tended to take place on high speed ovals, while Formula One used primarily permanent road courses. However, Champ Car had no oval tracks for the 2007 season (which was its last), while the IRL added road/street courses to what was originally an all-oval series, and IndyCar has had a nearly equal balance of ovals and road/street courses in some years. Currently, the IndyCar Series has fewer ovals on its schedule than road/street courses due to safety concerns; the 2021 season had only four oval races, out of 16 overall.
- Indy car racing was dominated by North American drivers until the 1980s and 1990s, which saw the debuts of drivers from Europe, South America, and Japan, many of whom had previously competed in Formula One. This led to Tony George forming the IRL in order to promote American drivers. Conversely, American drivers have not found much success in Formula One since the 1970s; the last American driver to date to have won a Formula One race or the World Drivers' Championship was Mario Andretti, who accomplished both in 1978. Andretti was born in Italy and later became an American citizen.
- Due partly to the lack of American drivers and teams, Formula One struggled to establish itself in that market, with the United States Grand Prix not being part of the Formula One season in some years. However, since the 2023 season, the Formula One calendar featured three Grands Prix taking place in the United States. In a parallel, Indy car racing has made little headway outside of the United States and Canada, despite occasionally having races overseas.

== Types of circuits ==
The American National Championship is notable for the wide variety of racetracks it has used compared to other series, such as Formula One and the various forms of Endurance sports car racing. The mainstays of the championship are as follows:

- Paved ovals and tri-ovals (e.g. Indianapolis, Texas)
- Permanent (or "Natural") road courses (e.g. Barber, Mid-Ohio)
- Temporary street circuits/courses (e.g. Long Beach, St. Pete)
- Combined road course (e.g. IndyCar Grand Prix)

Until 1970 the championship frequently raced on dirt and clay tracks, but all such tracks were removed permanently by USAC before the 1971 season.

From 1915 to 1931 board tracks were frequently used for championship races, however safety concerns and cost of maintenance, especially with the onset of the Great Depression, and nearly all were demolished in the 1930s.

The Pikes Peak Hillclimb was a round of the championship in the years 1947—1955 and 1965–1969.

In 1909 a point-to-point race from Los Angeles to Phoenix was included in the championship.

Airport runways have also been used to create temporary circuits. The most notable used for open-wheel racing was the Cleveland Grand Prix at Burke Lakefront Airport. St. Pete and Edmonton also utilize airport runways for parts of the course, however, they lead back to streets for the rest of the lap.

=== Events outside the United States ===
For the majority of the national championship, the races have been held inside the United States. American championship cars raced at the Monza oval in 1957 and 1958 alongside Formula One and sports cars in the non-championship Race of Two Worlds. Also, in 1966 there was a non-championship USAC race at Fuji Speedway in Japan. The first championship events outside the U.S. took place in 1967 at Mosport and Saint-Jovite in Canada. In 1971, the USAC season-opening race was held at Rafaela. In the autumn of 1978, two races were held in England, the first at Silverstone, then a week later at Brands Hatch.

Beginning in the mid-1980s, CART expanded throughout North America, venturing into Mexico (Mexico City) and Canada (Sanair, Toronto and Vancouver). In the 1990s and early 2000s, international expansion reached overseas with events at Surfer's Paradise, Rio de Janeiro, Motegi, Lausitz, and Rockingham.

Towards the end of its run, Champ Car ran races at European tracks such as TT Circuit Assen and Zolder Circuit, intentionally scheduled in regions and dates that would not compete with Formula One.

== Trophies and awards ==
=== Astor Cup ===
In 2011 IndyCar revived the Astor Cup, first awarded in 1915 as the series championship trophy. A black granite base has been added displaying the names of all the American Championship car racing series winners since 1909.

=== Vanderbilt Cup ===
The 1916, 1936 and 1937 Vanderbilt Cup races were included in the national championship. The 1909–1915 races were retrospectively added to the championship in 1926. CART resurrected the Cup in 1996 as the winner's trophy for the US500 race. When that race was discontinued in 2000, the Cup changed roles and became the championship trophy. Champ Car retained the rights to use the trophy after CART's bankruptcy, but use of the trophy was discontinued after Champ Car's merger with the Indy Racing League.

== Indianapolis 500 as part of the national championship ==
From its inception in 1911, the Indianapolis 500 has been considered the marquee event of Championship/Indy car racing. The race has been held every year from 1911, with the exception of 1917–1918 (World War I) and 1942–1945 (World War II). The Indianapolis 500 has been part of an official national championship in 1916, 1920–1941, and since 1946. In the years from 1911 to 1915, as well as 1919, the race was held as a formally sanctioned event, but an official national championship was not recognized in those years. Therefore, those six editions of the race were not attached to an officially recognized national championship.

Winning the Indianapolis 500 has frequently been considered at near or equal profile to winning the national championship. However, direct comparisons are difficult as many of the national champions are also Indy 500 winners in their own right. In many instances, drivers have won both the 500 and the championship in the same calendar year.

During the first USAC/CART open-wheel "split", which encompasses the period from 1979 to 1995, the status of the Indianapolis 500 as part of the national championship changed somewhat. The Indy 500 was sanctioned by USAC, and during that time, was officially part of the USAC Gold Crown Championship calendar. However, the bulk of the field was CART-based teams and drivers. The Indy 500 paid points to the CART title in 1979 and 1980, but did not count towards the CART title in 1981 and 1982. By 1983, an arrangement was made such that the Indy 500 would continue to be sanctioned singly by USAC, but be it would be recognized on the CART schedule, and pay championship points towards the CART title.

Starting in 1996, the Indianapolis 500 became part of the new Indy Racing League championship. All ties to the CART championship were severed. It was the beginning of the second open-wheel "split". In 2008, when the two series unified as IndyCar, ending the "split", the Indianapolis 500 was now part of the unified IndyCar Series national championship. Since 2014, the Indy 500 has paid double points towards the IndyCar Series points championship, and additional championship points are awarded based on Indy 500 qualifying results.

== Notable drivers ==
- The driver with the most championship titles and race wins is A. J. Foyt. From 1959 to 1981 Foyt won 67 USAC championship races and seven USAC titles.
- Mario Andretti is the most successful driver born outside the United States with 52 total wins (33 USAC & 19 CART) and 4 titles (3 USAC & 1 CART).
- New Zealand's Scott Dixon is the most successful non-U.S. driver with 6 championship titles and holds the record for IndyCar race wins (49). He sits 3rd all time behind A. J. Foyt and Mario Andretti with a total of 50 race wins (includes 1 CART/Champ Car win in 2001).
- Michael Andretti has won the most CART/Champ Car-sanctioned races (42).
- Tony Bettenhausen (19) is credited with the most AAA championship race wins.
- Danica Patrick is the only woman to ever win a national championship-level open-wheel race (Motegi, 2008). Sarah Fisher was the first female driver to win a pole position (Kentucky, 2002).
- Four drivers have held the crowns of CART Champion and Formula One World Driving Champion.
  - Mario Andretti, Emerson Fittipaldi, Nigel Mansell, Jacques Villeneuve
- Six other drivers have won both a national championship race as well as at least one Formula One Grand Prix. They are as follows:
  - Peter Revson, Dan Gurney, Jim Clark, Graham Hill, Juan Pablo Montoya, Jackie Stewart

== Notable fatalities in competition ==
- Jimmy Murphy, champion in 1922 and 1924, died after crashing at the Syracuse Mile in September, 1924.
- Ted Horn, champion in 1946, 1947, and 1948, died after crashing at the DuQuoin dirt track in late 1948.
- Defending Indianapolis 500 winners Floyd Roberts and Bill Vukovich were killed during the 1939 and 1955 Indy 500s, respectively.
- 1951 and 1958 champion Tony Bettenhausen was killed in a crash at Indianapolis in May 1961.
- Eddie Sachs and Dave MacDonald were killed during the 1964 Indianapolis 500.
- Art Pollard (practice) and Swede Savage (race) died of injuries suffered during the 1973 Indianapolis 500.
- Gordon Smiley was killed while attempting to qualify for the 1982 Indianapolis 500.
- 1996 Indianapolis 500 pole-sitter Scott Brayton was killed May 17, 1996, during a practice session for the Indianapolis 500.
- Gonzalo Rodríguez was killed September 11, 1999, during a qualifying in the IndyCar Monterey Grand Prix at Laguna Seca.
- Greg Moore died after an October 31, 1999, crash in the Marlboro 500 at Fontana.
- Paul Dana died during practice for the first race of the 2006 IndyCar Series season, at Homestead-Miami Speedway on March 26, 2006.
- 2005 IndyCar Series champion and two-time Indianapolis 500 champion Dan Wheldon died after a 15-car pile-up on the 11th lap of the IZOD IndyCar World Championships at Las Vegas Motor Speedway on October 16, 2011.
- Justin Wilson died on August 24, 2015, the day after a crash on lap 180 of the 2015 ABC Supply 500 at Pocono Raceway.

== National champions ==
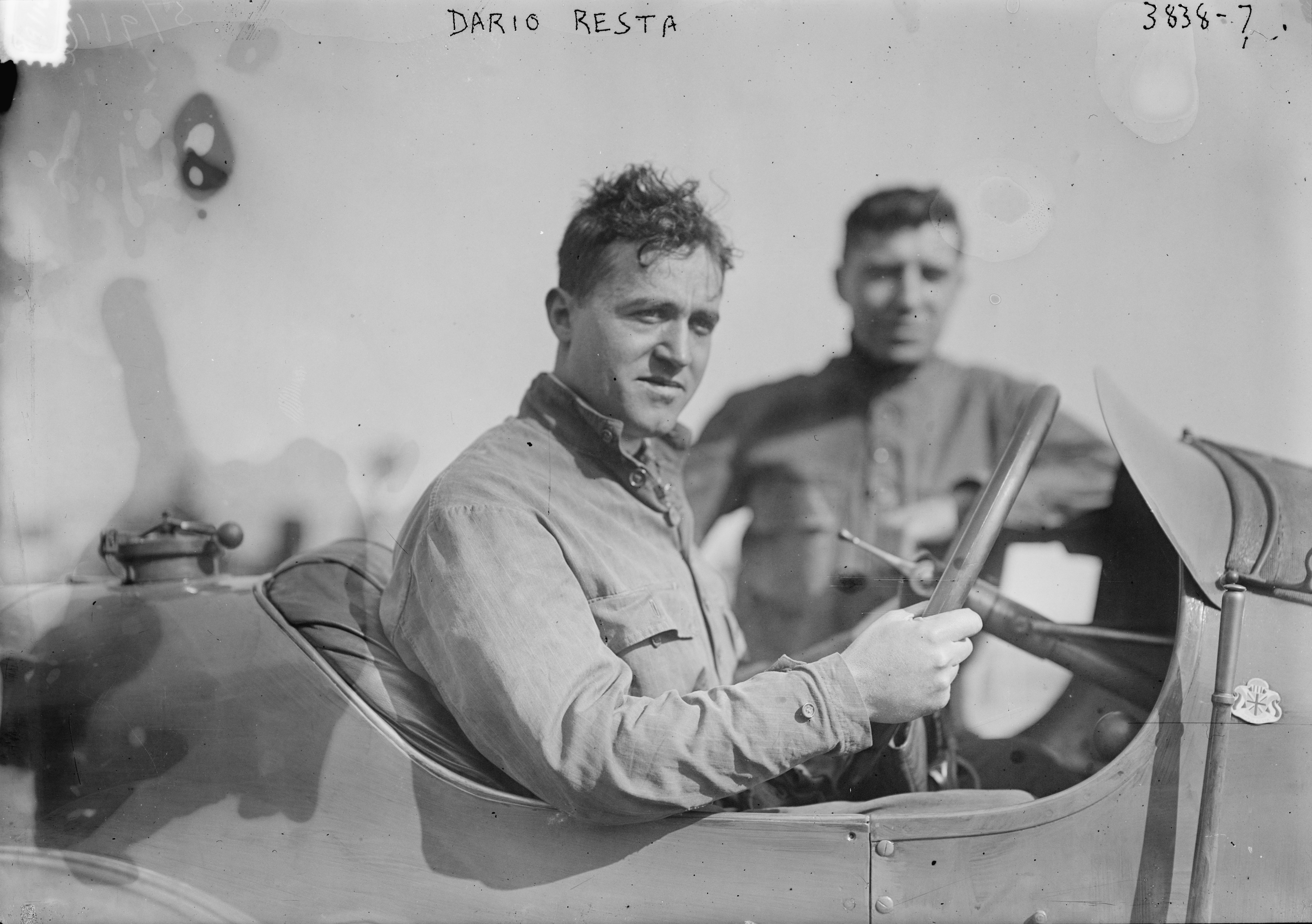
Dario Resta, 1916 National Champion

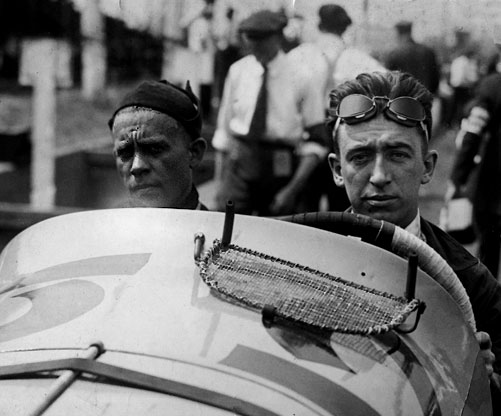
Jimmy Murphy (right), 1922 & 1924 National Champion

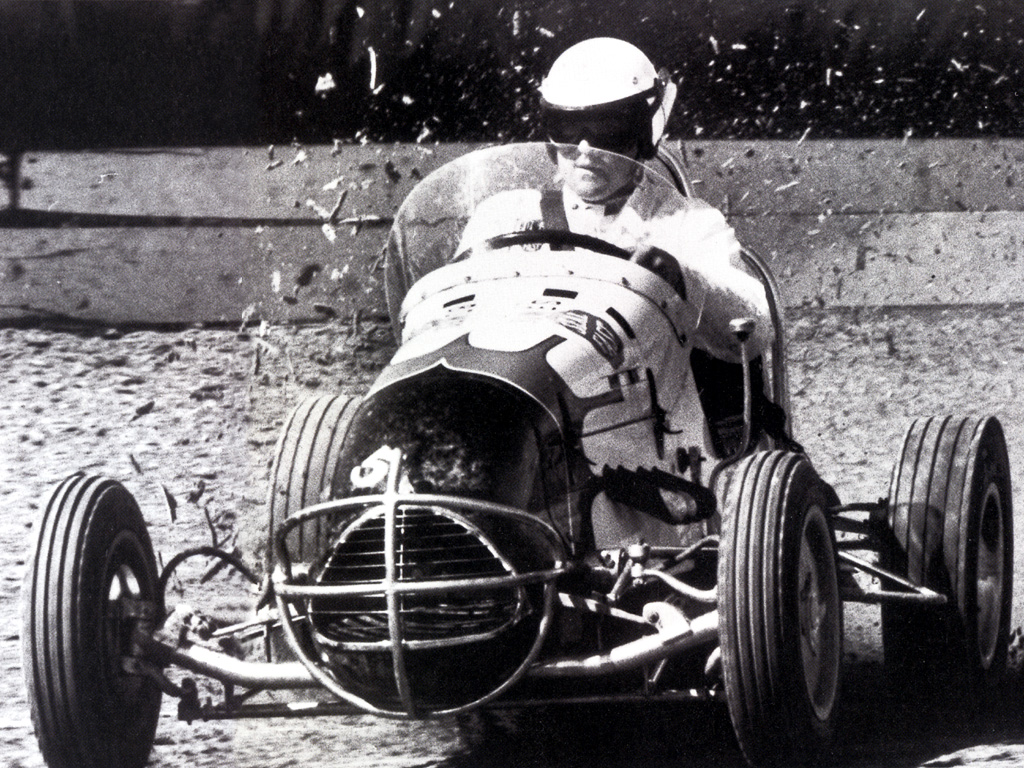
A. J. Foyt, 7-time National Champion (1960, '61, '63, '64, '67, '75, '79)

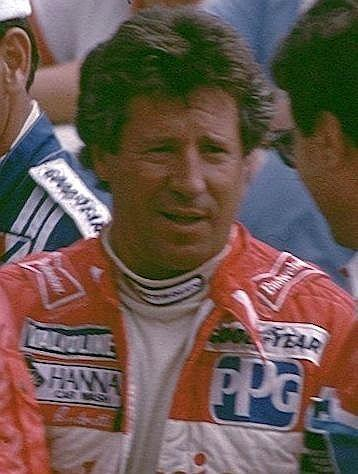
Mario Andretti; 1965, 1966, 1969, & 1984 Champion

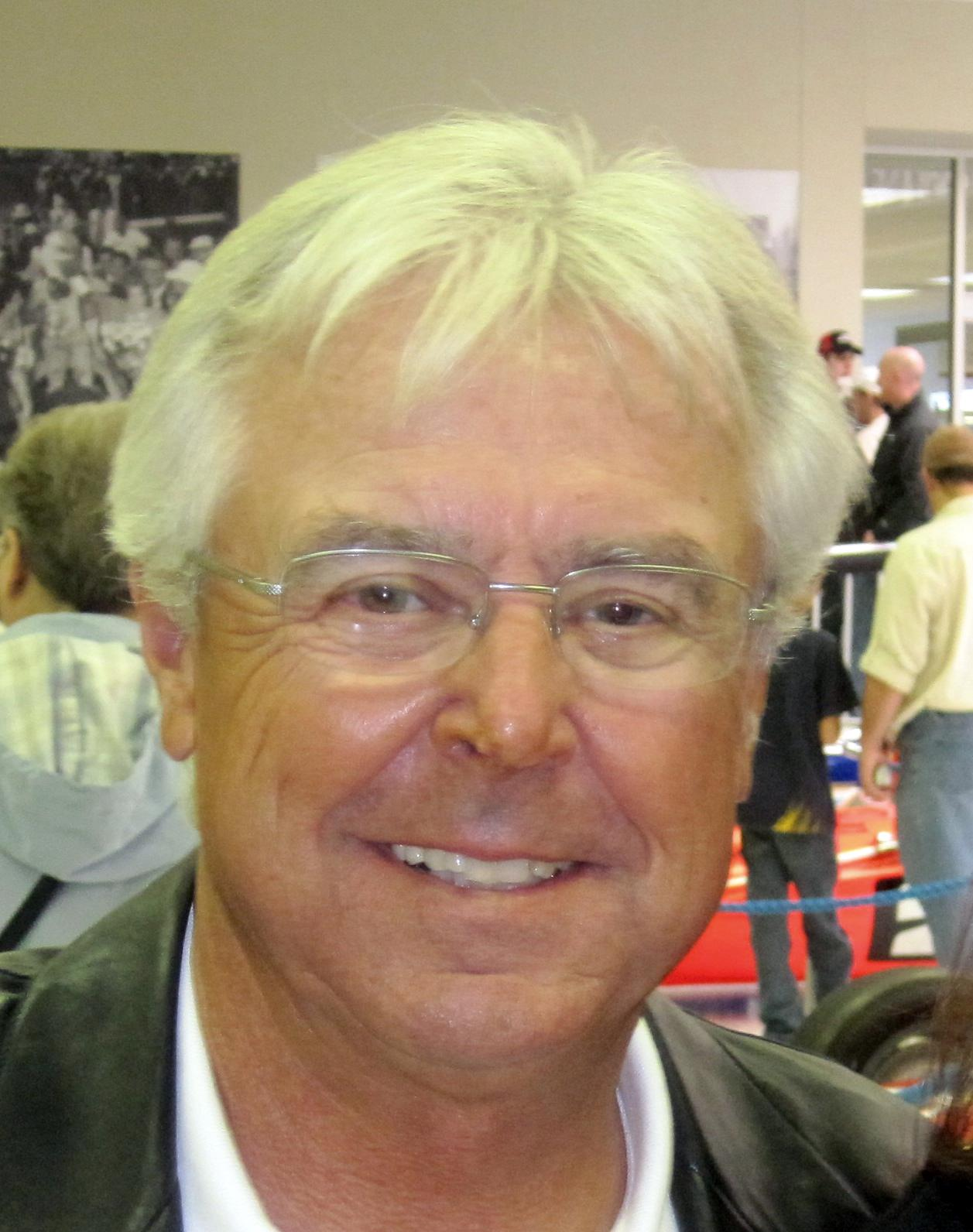
Rick Mears; 1979, 1981, & 1982 IndyCar Champion

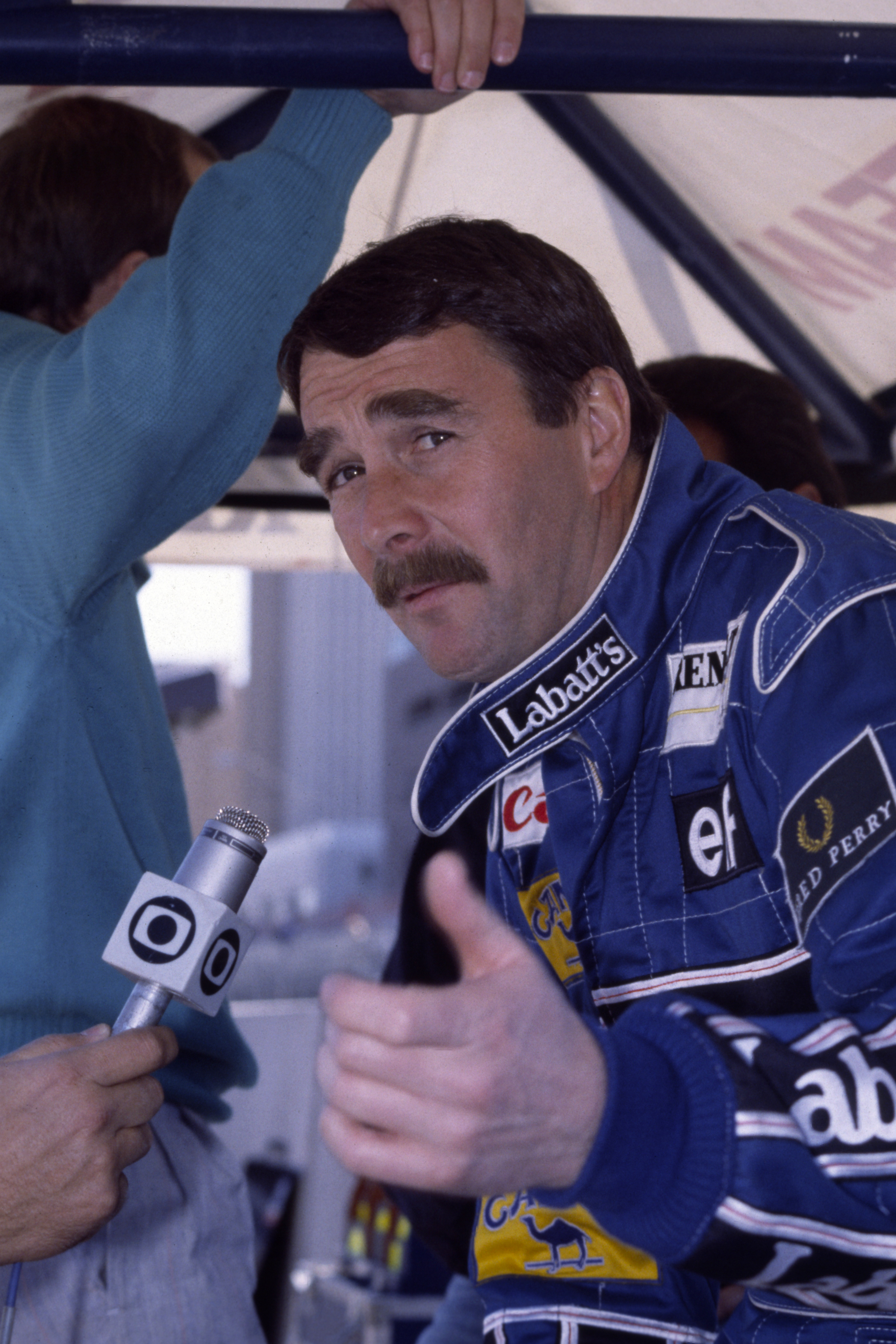
Nigel Mansell, 1993 IndyCar Champion

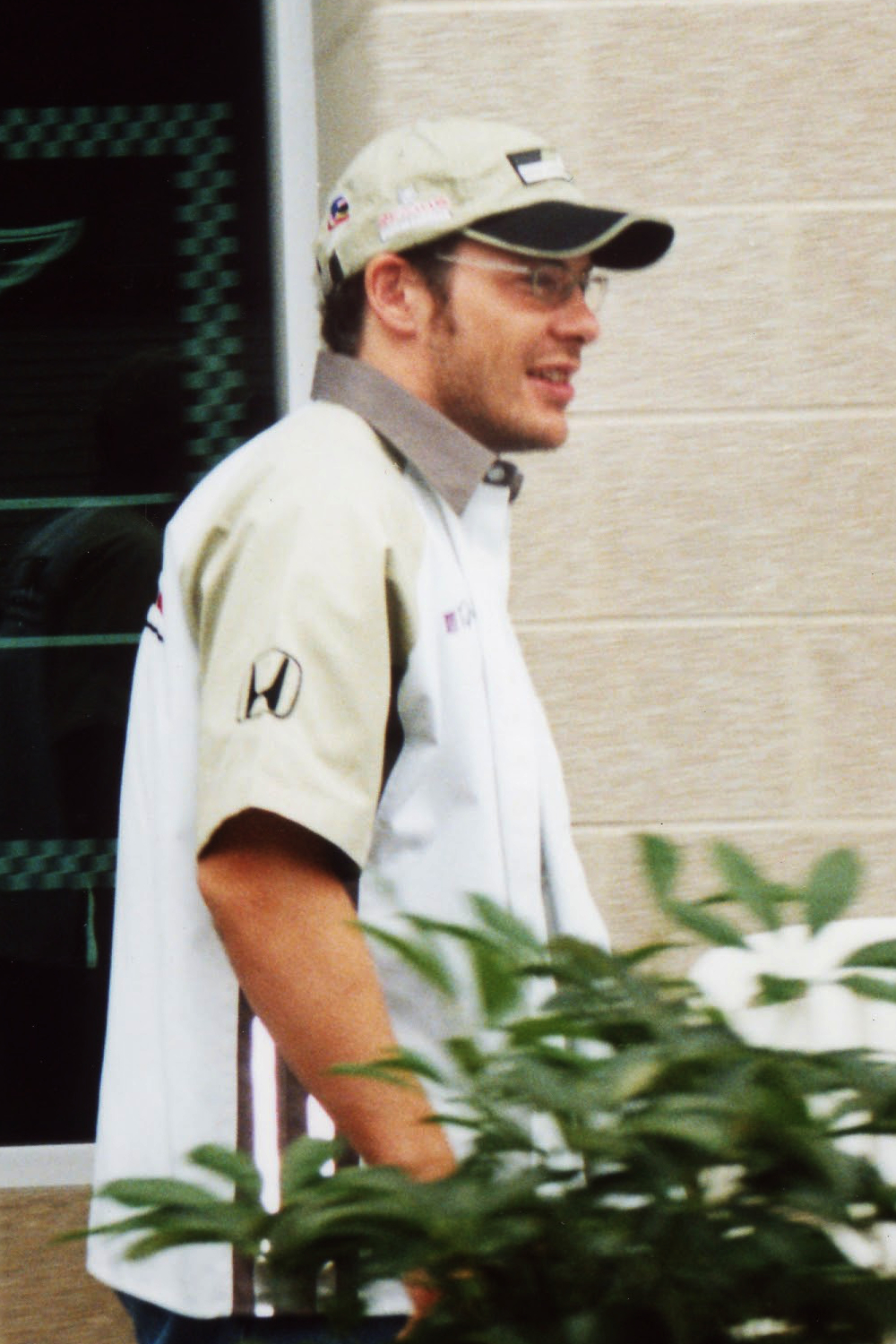
Jacques Villeneuve, 1995 IndyCar Champion

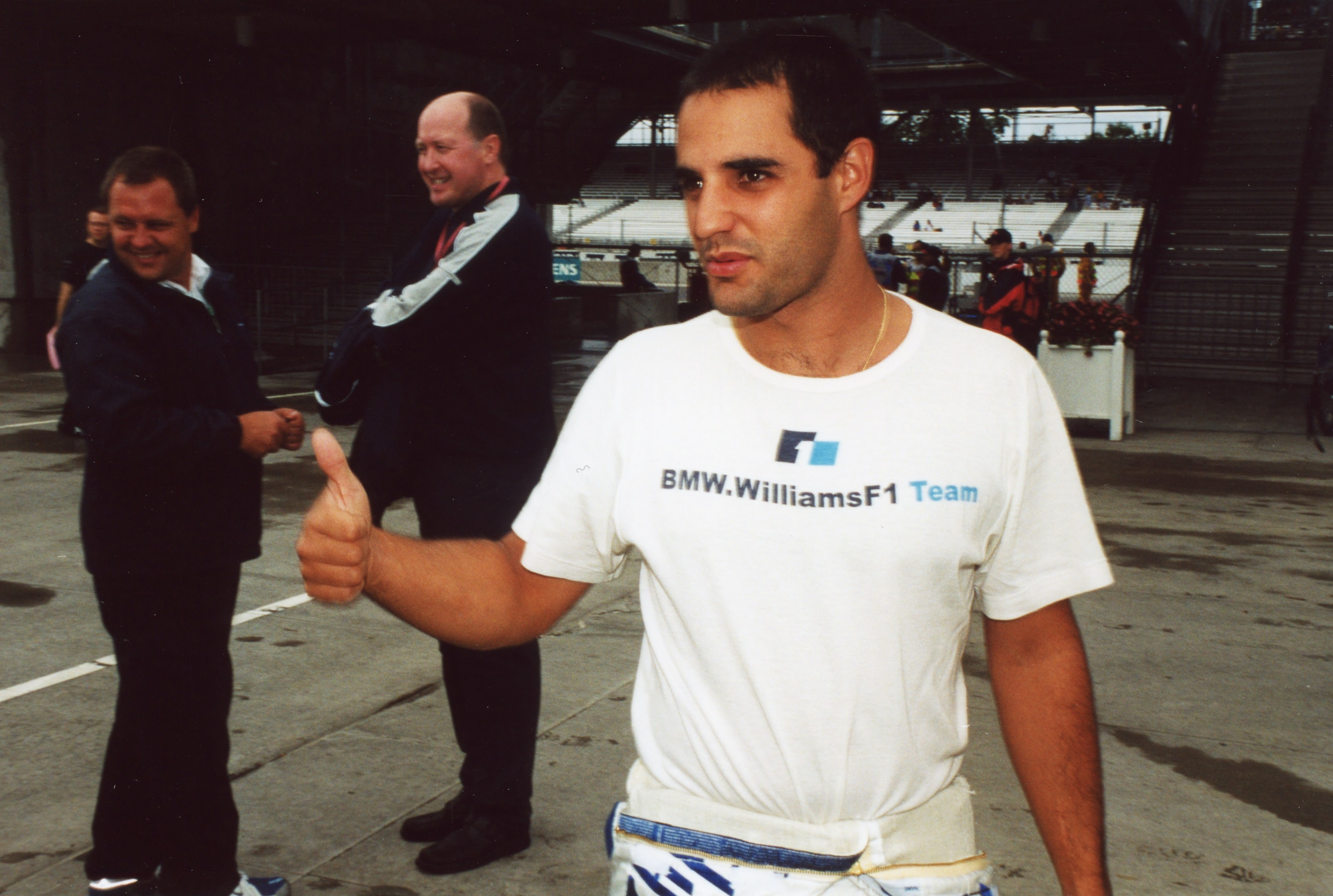
Juan Pablo Montoya, 1999 CART Champion

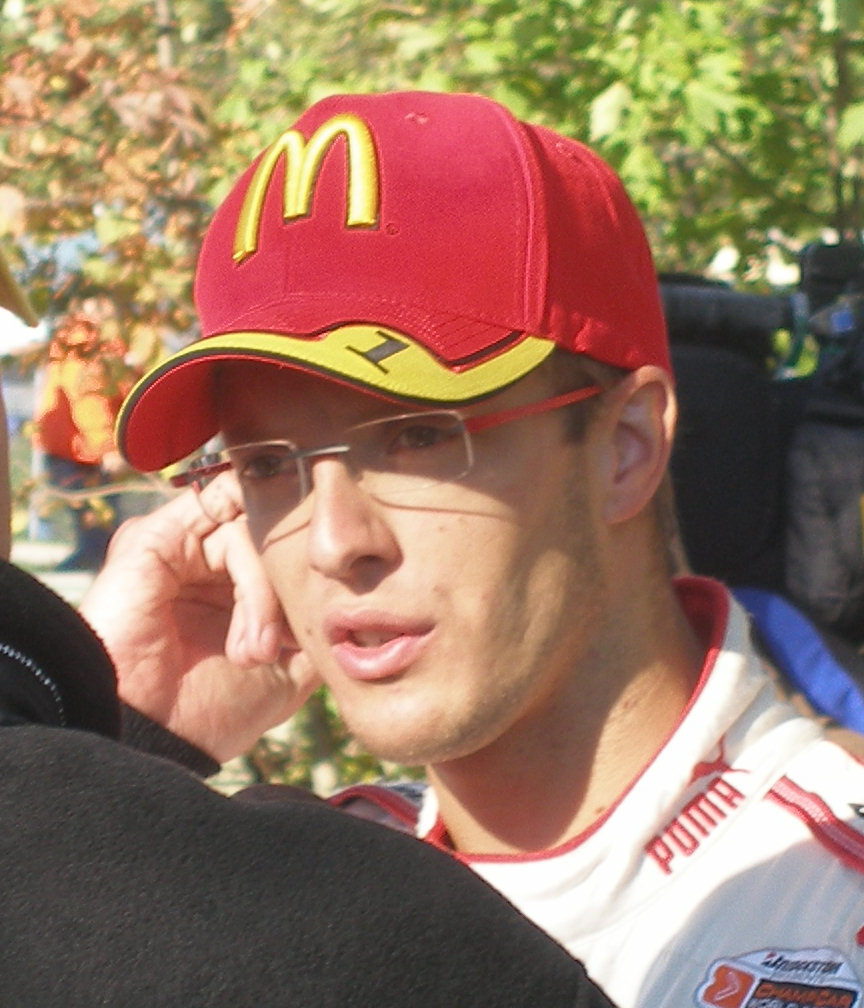
Sébastien Bourdais, 4-time Champ Car World Series champion (2004–2007), the only champion under that banner

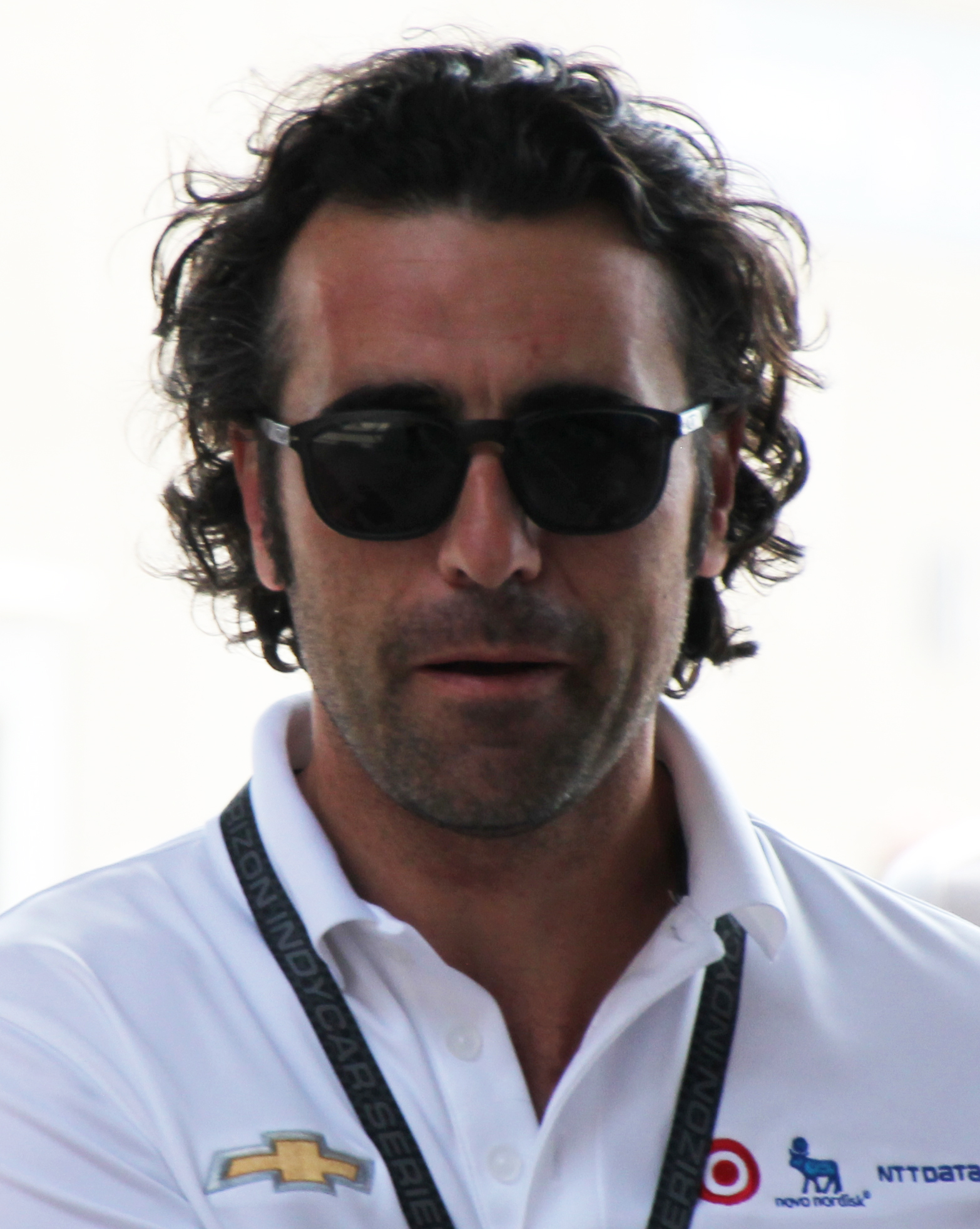
Dario Franchitti; 2007, 2009, 2010 and 2011 IndyCar Series champion

Year	Champion		
AAA National Championship
1905	(United States) Barney Oldfield		
1906–1915: No championships
1916	(United Kingdom) Dario Resta		
1917–1919: No championships (World War I)
1920	(United States) Gaston Chevrolet		
1921	(United States) Tommy Milton		
1922	(United States) Jimmy Murphy		
1923	(United States) Eddie Hearne		
1924	(United States) Jimmy Murphy (2)		
1925	(United States) Peter DePaolo		
1926	(United States) Harry Hartz		
1927	(United States) Peter DePaolo (2)		
1928	(United States) Louis Meyer		
1929	(United States) Louis Meyer (2)		
1930	(United States) Billy Arnold		
1931	(United States) Louis Schneider		
1932	(United States) Bob Carey		
1933	(United States) Louis Meyer (3)		
1934	(United States) Bill Cummings		
1935	(United States) Kelly Petillo		
1936	(United States) Mauri Rose		
1937	(United States) Wilbur Shaw		
1938	(United States) Floyd Roberts		
1939	(United States) Wilbur Shaw (2)		
1940	(United States) Rex Mays		
1941	(United States) Rex Mays (2)		
1942–1945: No championships (World War II)
1946	(United States) Ted Horn		
1947	(United States) Ted Horn (2)		
1948	(United States) Ted Horn (3)		
1949	(United States) Johnnie Parsons		
1950	(United States) Henry Banks		
1951	(United States) Tony Bettenhausen		
1952	(United States) Chuck Stevenson		
1953	(United States) Sam Hanks		
1954	(United States) Jimmy Bryan		
1955	(United States) Bob Sweikert		
USAC National Championship
1956	(United States) Jimmy Bryan (2)		
1957	(United States) Jimmy Bryan (3)		
1958	(United States) Tony Bettenhausen (2)		
1959	(United States) Rodger Ward		
1960	(United States) A. J. Foyt		
1961	(United States) A. J. Foyt (2)		
1962	(United States) Rodger Ward (2)		
1963	(United States) A. J. Foyt (3)		
1964	(United States) A. J. Foyt (4)		
1965	(United States) Mario Andretti		
1966	(United States) Mario Andretti (2)		
1967	(United States) A. J. Foyt (5)		
1968	(United States) Bobby Unser		
1969	(United States) Mario Andretti (3)		
1970	(United States) Al Unser		
1971	(United States) Joe Leonard		
1972	(United States) Joe Leonard (2)		
1973	(United States) Roger McCluskey		
1974	(United States) Bobby Unser (2)		
1975	(United States) A. J. Foyt (6)		
1976	(United States) Gordon Johncock		
1977	(United States) Tom Sneva		
1978	(United States) Tom Sneva (2)		
1979	(United States) A. J. Foyt (7)	Year	CART Indy Car Series
1979	(United States) A. J. Foyt (7)	1979	(United States) Rick Mears
1980	(United States) Johnny Rutherford	1980	(United States) Johnny Rutherford (2)
Year	USAC Gold Crown Championship^{A}^{B}	1981	(United States) Rick Mears (2)
1981–82	(United States) George Snider	1982	(United States) Rick Mears (3)
1982–83	(United States) Tom Sneva	1983	(United States) Al Unser (2)
1983–84	(United States) Rick Mears	1984	(United States) Mario Andretti (4)
1984–85	(United States) Danny Sullivan	1985	(United States) Al Unser (3)
1985–86	(United States) Bobby Rahal	1986	(United States) Bobby Rahal
1986–87	(United States) Al Unser	1987	(United States) Bobby Rahal (2)
1987–88	(United States) Rick Mears	1988	(United States) Danny Sullivan
1988–89	(Brazil) Emerson Fittipaldi	1989	(Brazil) Emerson Fittipaldi
1989–90	(Netherlands) Arie Luyendyk	1990	(United States) Al Unser Jr.
1990–91	(United States) Rick Mears	1991	(United States) Michael Andretti
1991–92	(United States) Al Unser Jr.	1992	(United States) Bobby Rahal (3)
1992–93	(Brazil) Emerson Fittipaldi	1993	(United Kingdom) Nigel Mansell
1993–94	(United States) Al Unser Jr.	1994	(United States) Al Unser Jr. (2)
1994–95	(Canada) Jacques Villeneuve	1995	(Canada) Jacques Villeneuve
Year	Indy Racing League	1996	(United States) Jimmy Vasser
1996	(United States) Buzz Calkins / Scott Sharp	1996	(United States) Jimmy Vasser
1996–97	(United States) Tony Stewart	1997	(Italy) Alex Zanardi
1998	(Sweden) Kenny Bräck	1998	(Italy) Alex Zanardi (2)
1999	(United States) Greg Ray	1999	(Colombia) Juan Pablo Montoya
2000	(United States) Buddy Lazier	2000	(Brazil) Gil de Ferran
2001	(United States) Sam Hornish Jr.	2001	(Brazil) Gil de Ferran (2)
2002	(United States) Sam Hornish Jr. (2)	2002	(Brazil) Cristiano da Matta
Year	IndyCar Series	2003	(Canada) Paul Tracy
2003	(New Zealand) Scott Dixon	2003	(Canada) Paul Tracy
2004	(Brazil) Tony Kanaan	Year	Champ Car World Series
2004	(Brazil) Tony Kanaan	2004	(France) Sébastien Bourdais
2005	(United Kingdom) Dan Wheldon	2005	(France) Sébastien Bourdais (2)
2006	(United States) Sam Hornish Jr. (3)	2006	(France) Sébastien Bourdais (3)
2007	(United Kingdom) Dario Franchitti	2007	(France) Sébastien Bourdais (4)
Year	IndyCar Series		
2008	(New Zealand) Scott Dixon (2)		
2009	(United Kingdom) Dario Franchitti (2)		
2010	(United Kingdom) Dario Franchitti (3)		
2011	(United Kingdom) Dario Franchitti (4)		
2012	(United States) Ryan Hunter-Reay		
2013	(New Zealand) Scott Dixon (3)		
2014	(Australia) Will Power		
2015	(New Zealand) Scott Dixon (4)		
2016	(France) Simon Pagenaud		
2017	(United States) Josef Newgarden		
2018	(New Zealand) Scott Dixon (5)		
2019	(United States) Josef Newgarden (2)		
2020	(New Zealand) Scott Dixon (6)		
2021	(Spain) Álex Palou		
2022	(Australia) Will Power (2)		
2023	(Spain) Álex Palou (2)		
2024	(Spain) Álex Palou (3)		
2025	(Spain) Álex Palou (4)		
2026	(Spain) Álex Palou (5)		

^A From 1979 to 1995 the Indianapolis 500 and the national championship were sanctioned by separate organizations, USAC and CART, respectively. USAC continued to sanction their own national championship series until 1981, when they formed the USAC Gold Crown Championship.
^B From 1985 to 1995 the USAC Gold Crown Championship consisted solely of the Indianapolis 500, thus making such championship winners indistinguishable from Indianapolis winners. IndyCar does not recognize winners of the USAC Gold Crown Championship as full season champions.

== In fiction ==
Films

- The Crowd Roars (1932)
- Speed (1936)
- Indianapolis Speedway (1939)
- The Big Wheel (1949)
- To Please a Lady (1950)
- Roar of the Crowd (1953)
- Winning (1969)
- Super Speedway (1997)
- Driven (2001)
- Turbo (2013)

Video games

== See also ==
- List of American Championship car racing point scoring systems
- NASCAR Speedway Division
- American Indycar Series
