= 100 mph Club =

American auto racing honor

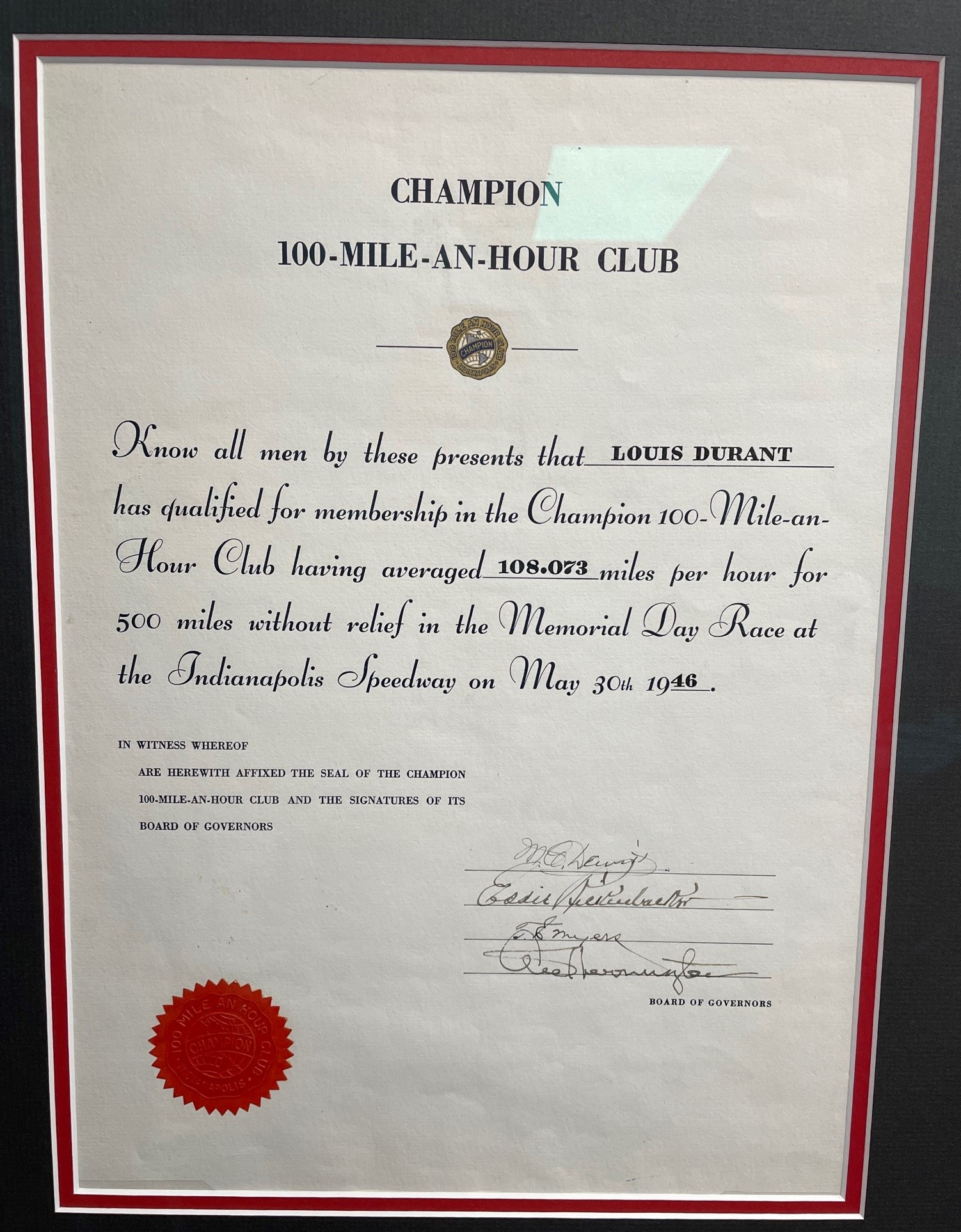
The 100 MPH Club certificate awarded to Louis Durant, currently on display in the office of Indianapolis Motor Speedway president J. Douglas Boles

The Champion Spark Plug 100 Mile an Hour Club was a group formed to honor drivers who completed the Indianapolis 500 at an average speed of 100 miles per hour or faster. It was formed in 1935, and continued to be recognized through 1969. It was sponsored by Champion Spark Plugs, and was the brainchild of M.C. deWitt, the company's advertising manager. During its heyday, it was considered one of the most prestigious honors in motorsports (the Indy car counterpart to NASCAR's famous Darlington Record Club), and membership was highly sought after by drivers.

A total of 124 drivers were inducted as members, with 1930 winner Billy Arnold named the club's first member.

== History ==
The first driver to complete the Indianapolis 500 at an average speed of 100 mph was Pete DePaolo in 1925. However, Norman Batten drove 21 laps of relief (laps 106–127) while DePaolo had his hands bandaged due to blisters and bruises. Thus DePaolo did not accomplish the feat solo.

Five years later in 1930, Billy Arnold won the race with an average speed of 100.488 mph. He was the second driver to complete the race in under five hours, but the first ever to do so without relief help.

In 1934, M.C. deWitt, the advertising manager for Champion, had a conversation with driver Dave Evans. Evans had finished 6th in the 1934 Indianapolis 500. In doing so, Evans had become the twelfth driver in history to complete the full 500 miles solo, at an average speed of over 100 mph. Immediately deWitt envisioned an idea to create an honorary "club" for the drivers who had accomplished the noteworthy feat. In 1935, the Champion Spark Plugs 100 mph Club was born.

The inaugural class would consist of the 12 drivers who had accomplished the feat thus far. The first member retroactively being Billy Arnold, along with Fred Frame, Howdy Wilcox II, Cliff Bergere, Bob Carey, Russ Snowberger, Louis Meyer, Chet Gardner, Wilbur Shaw, Lou Moore, Stubby Stubblefield, and Dave Evans. An annual banquet would be held in the drivers' honor, and each inductee would receive a leather jacket. Carey and Stubblefield were deceased, and Arnold did not attend, but all of the other nine living members were present at the first banquet.

== Membership qualifications ==
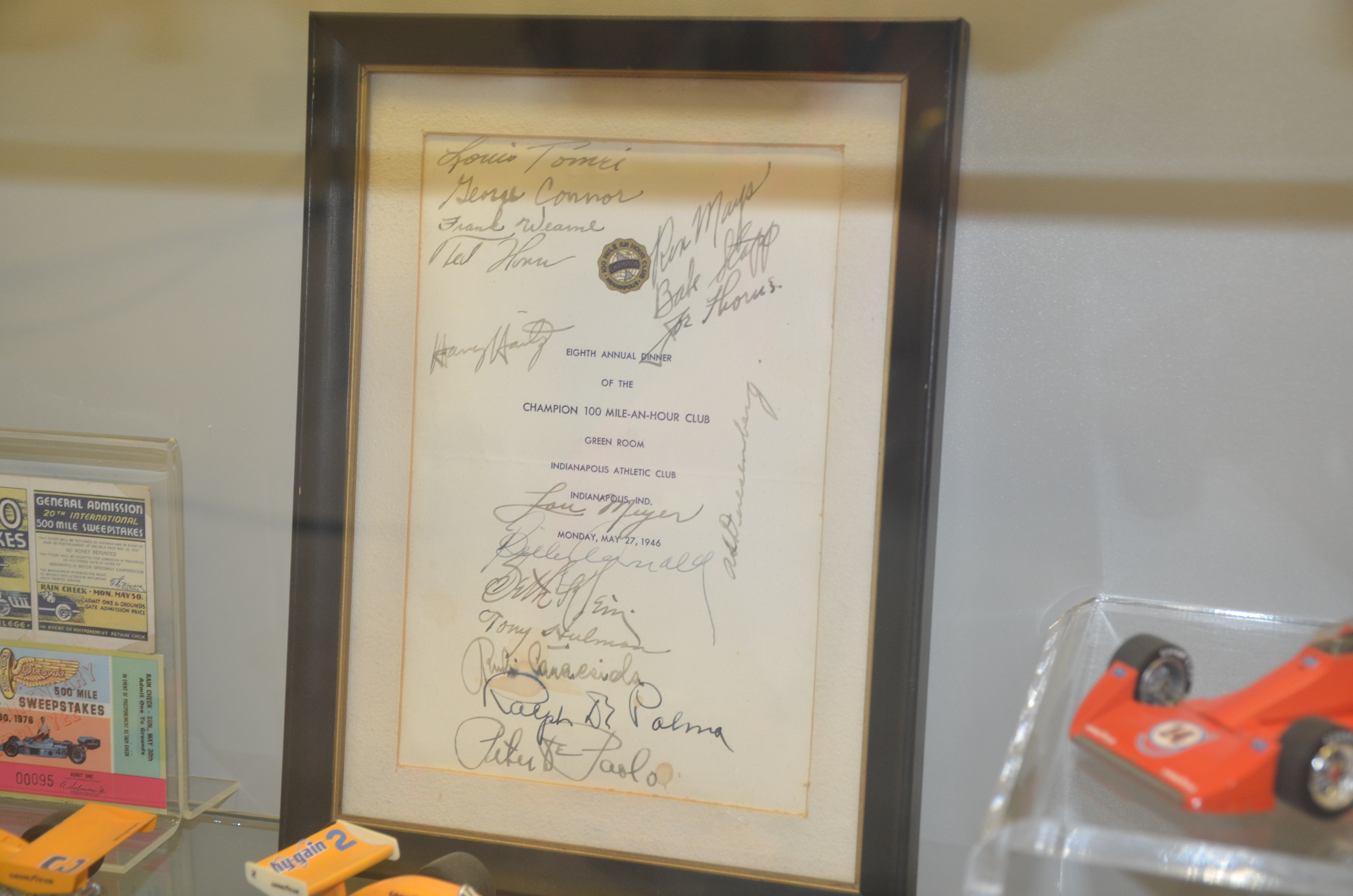
Champion 100 MPH Club dinner invitation

The requirements to qualify for the 100 mph Club were fairly straightforward. A driver was required to complete the Indianapolis 500 at an average speed of 100 mph or faster, driving the entire race without any relief help. It was permissible to be accompanied by a riding mechanic. However, the period in which riding mechanics were utilized at Indianapolis overlapped only briefly from when the club was formed.

The 100 mph average speed equated to finishing the race in five hours or less. The driver was not required to win the race, but a strict requirement was to complete the full 500 miles (200 laps). Rain-shortened races, or drivers that were flagged off the track before completing all 200 laps (even if their average speed was over 100 mph at the time) would not qualify.

Drivers were inducted for lifetime memberships, but drivers were separately honored each time they accomplished the feat. Many drivers broke the 100 mph barrier multiple times during the career. Ted Horn accomplished the feat a record total of eight times in his career. Each subsequent membership was rewarded with being seated at the head table during the next annual banquet.

Prior to the 1960s, the drivers were permitted ample time to complete the full 500 mile distance, even if it meant remaining on the track for several minutes or over an hour after the winner crossed the finish line. In the very early years, completing the full 500 miles was even a requirement to receive any prize money. For a time, it was the norm for officials to wait until at least 10-12 cars completed the 500 miles before waving the cars off the track. However, that was not a hard-and-fast rule. Officials often just used judgement to decide when it prudent to stop. A total of 16 cars went the distance in 1959, while only five did so in 1938. In 1940, only the top three were permitted to finish, due to a rain shower.

The honor of joining the prestigious 100 mph Club was considered motivation to continue racing, even if the chance to win the race had already gone away. In most cases, several cars would complete the distance, and numerous drivers might be added to the Club annually.

== Champion Highway Safety Program ==
Around 1954, Champion formed as part of their public relations efforts, a Driver's education program geared towards teenagers and young adults. The Champion Highway Safety Program traveled around the country giving presentations at high schools and military bases about driving safety tips. For many years, a team of drivers from the 100 mph Club were used to give the lectures, and some were used in Educational films.

The lectures were popular and well-received, and were usually sponsored by a local newspaper or radio station. The appearances were also used as promotional tool for automobile racing, and offered the drivers work during the off-season.

== Demise ==
In 1964, when the race started airing live on MCA closed-circuit television, the rules were changed which limited the time drivers were allotted to finish the race once the winner crossed the finish line. Roughly five minutes were allowed for the other cars on the track to complete the 200 laps. This had the effect of substantially limiting the chances of joining the 100 mph Club, and only a handful of drivers earned the honor after 1964.

Also perhaps contributing to the club's demise was the evolving times. By the mid-1960s, speeds at Indy had risen considerably since the club's formation - and were poised to rise substantially over the next few years. Covering the full 500 miles at an average speed of 100 mph was not considered a noteworthy accomplishment any longer. Most winners were finishing the race with as much as an hour and a half to spare to fulfill the 100 mph Club's qualifications. Apropos to that, membership in the drivers' eyes was still highly coveted.

In 1964, rival spark plug manufacturer Autolite created the "Pacemakers Club," which recognized drivers who had led at least one lap during the Indianapolis 500. It began to rise in stature and popularity, and became a more period-relevant "club" associated with the Indianapolis 500. In its favor, it was not linked to changes in equipment, conditions, or perceived obsolete speed milestones. Likewise, it was not adverse to rain-shortened races, and drivers conceivably could still join the "club" despite dropping out of the race - i.e., if he had led laps prior to dropping out.

During the 1969 race, no new members were inducted into the 100 mph Club, since all four drivers who completed the 500 miles that year were already part of the club. In 1970, Dick McGeorge, Champion's public relations representative, retired from his position. McGeorge was considered the key fixture in organizing the club, dating back to 1946. He died in 1971, and the 100 mph Club quietly folded. In retrospect, the 1968 inductees (led by race winner Bobby Unser) would be the final names added to the membership.

=== Al Unser ===
One of the more notable omissions from the 100 mph Club was Al Unser Sr. He first arrived at Indianapolis in 1965, finishing 9th, flagged after 196 laps. He crashed out in 1966, but in 1967, he was running second in the waning laps. As leader A. J. Foyt was coming out of turn four to take the checkered flag, a crash occurred on the front stretch. Foyt weaved his way through the wreck to win, but officials immediately thereafter put out the red flag to stop the race. Al Unser was about a lap and a half away from the finish line when he was flagged off and was officially credited with only 198 laps in the final scoring.

Unser crashed out of the 1968 race. His brother Bobby won, and incidentally joined the 100 mph Club for himself. Al Unser missed the 1969 race due to a broken leg suffered in a motorcycle crash earlier in the month. In 1970, he came back to win the race in dominating fashion. His average speed of 155.749 mph was well over the requirement to be invited into the club, and he was expected by all to be honored as the next member. However, after McGeorge's retirement, and subsequent passing, the 1971 banquet never happened. The club was quietly abandoned and membership was closed without Al Unser ever being officially inducted.

Incidentally, following the demise of the 100 mph Club, Al Unser would go on to complete the full 500 miles seven times (including four wins), all at better than a 100 mph average.

== List of club members ==
Membership list as of June 1, 1968

- Fred Agabashian
- George Amick
- Red Amick
- Emil Andres
- Mario Andretti
- Billy Arnold
- Chuck Arnold
- Bobby Ball
- Henry Banks
- George Barringer
- Cliff Bergere
- Tony Bettenhausen Sr.
- Johnny Boyd
- Jack Brabham
- Don Branson
- Walt Brown
- Jimmy Bryan
- Bob Carey
- Duane Carter Sr.
- Bill Cheesbourg
- Joie Chitwood
- Jim Clark
- Hal Cole
- George Connor
- Larry Crockett
- Art Cross
- Bill Cummings
- Bob Christie
- Jimmy Davies
- Don Davis
- Jimmy Daywalt
- Ronnie Duman
- Louis Durant
- Dave Evans
- Pat Flaherty
- Fred Frame
- Don Freeland
- Myron Fohr
- A. J. Foyt
- Chet Gardner
- Cliff Griffith
- Paul Goldsmith
- Dan Gurney
- Norm Hall
- Sam Hanks
- Gene Hartley
- Mack Hellings
- Ralph Hepburn
- Al Herman
- Graham Hill
- Bill Holland
- Bill Homeier
- Ted Horn
- Denis Hulme
- Chuck Hulse
- Jim Hurtubise
- Jimmy Jackson
- Joe James
- Gordon Johncock
- Eddie Johnson
- Parnelli Jones
- Al Keller
- Mel Kenyon
- Jud Larson
- Andy Linden
- Doc MacKenzie
- Johnny Mantz
- Bobby Marshman
- Rex Mays
- Ernie McCoy
- Jim McElreath
- Jack McGrath
- Jim McWithey
- Louis Meyer
- Zeke Meyer
- Al Miller
- Chet Miller
- Lou Moore
- Duke Nalon
- Mike Nazaruk
- Cal Niday
- Pat O'Connor
- Johnnie Parsons
- Kelly Petillo
- Ray Pixley
- Jimmy Reece
- Dick Rathmann
- Jim Rathmann
- Jim Rigsby
- Floyd Roberts
- George Robson
- Ebb Rose
- Mauri Rose
- Lloyd Ruby
- Paul Russo
- Troy Ruttman
- Eddie Sachs
- Bill Schindler
- Wilbur Shaw
- Russ Snowberger
- Jimmy Snyder
- Babe Stapp
- Chuck Stevenson
- Stubby Stubblefield
- Len Sutton
- Bob Sweikert
- Marshall Teague
- Shorty Templeman
- Bud Tingelstad
- Johnny Thomson
- Joel Thorne
- Johnnie Tolan
- Louis Tomei
- Jack Turner
- Bobby Unser
- Bob Veith
- Luigi Villoresi
- Bill Vukovich
- Lee Wallard
- Rodger Ward
- Johnny White
- Howdy Wilcox II
- Dempsey Wilson
- Frank Wearne

== Membership records ==
=== Most memberships ===
- 8 times
  - Ted Horn (1936, 1937, 1938, 1939, 1941, 1946, 1947, 1948)
- 7 times
  - Wilbur Shaw (1933, 1935, 1936, 1937, 1938, 1939, 1940)
  - Jim Rathmann (1952, 1957, 1958, 1959, 1960, 1962)
  - Rodger Ward (1956, 1959, 1960, 1961, 1962, 1963, 1964)
- 6 times
  - Mauri Rose (1934, 1936, 1939, 1940, 1947, 1948)
- 5 times
  - Johnny Boyd (1957, 1958, 1959, 1962, 1964)
  - A. J. Foyt (1959, 1961, 1963, 1964, 1967)
  - Lloyd Ruby (1960, 1961, 1962, 1964, 1968)

=== Most memberships as a race winner ===
- 3 times
  - Wilbur Shaw (1937, 1939, 1940)
  - A. J. Foyt (1961, 1964, 1967)
- 2 times
  - Louis Meyer (1933, 1936)
  - Mauri Rose (1947, 1948)
  - Bill Vukovich (1953, 1954)
  - Rodger Ward (1959, 1962)

=== Fastest average speed at the time the club was disbanded ===
- 152.882 mph — Bobby Unser (1968)

== Post award ==
From 1970 to 2016, a total of 108 additional drivers have unofficially joined the 100 mph Club. Although no official subcategories have ever been created, a total of 98 of them made it into a faster "150 mph Club."

A total of 33 drivers have joined the very exclusive "185 mph Club". They are led by Tony Kanaan, who won the fastest 500 in 2013. Two additional drivers, Rick Mears and Michael Andretti, managed to break the 175 mph barrier from the 1991 race.

During the late 1980s and early 1990s, a separate award was created called the Marlboro 500 Mile Club. Sponsored by Marlboro, it was a cash prize of $75,000 split amongst the drivers who completed the full 500 miles each year.

== Notes ==
=== Works cited ===
- Dick Ralstin's Racing Home Page - Champion's Champions at 100 Miles an Hour
- 1969 Indianapolis 500 Daily Trackside Report
- The Talk of Gasoline Alley - 1070-AM WIBC, May 17, 2007

=== See also ===
- Darlington Record Club
