= Robert Cary =

Robert Cary may refer to:

- Robert Cary (died c. 1431), of Cockington, Devon, MP for Devon
- Robert Cary (priest) (1615?–1688)
- Sir Robert Cary, 1st Baronet (1898–1979), British Conservative politician, MP 1935–1945, 1951–1974
- Robert H. Cary (1885–1912), American football player and coach at the University of Montana
- Robert Webster Cary (1890–1967), United States Navy officer and Medal of Honor recipient

== See also ==
- Robert Carey (disambiguation)
- Robert Cary-Williams, British fashion designer
- Cary (surname)
