= Bob Carey =

Bob Carey is the name of:

- Bob Carey (racing driver) (1904–1933), American race car driver
- Bob Carey (American football) (1930–1988), American football player
- Bob Carey (singer), American folk singer, member of The Tarriers

== See also ==
- Robert Carey (disambiguation)
