= History of Torquay =

History of English town

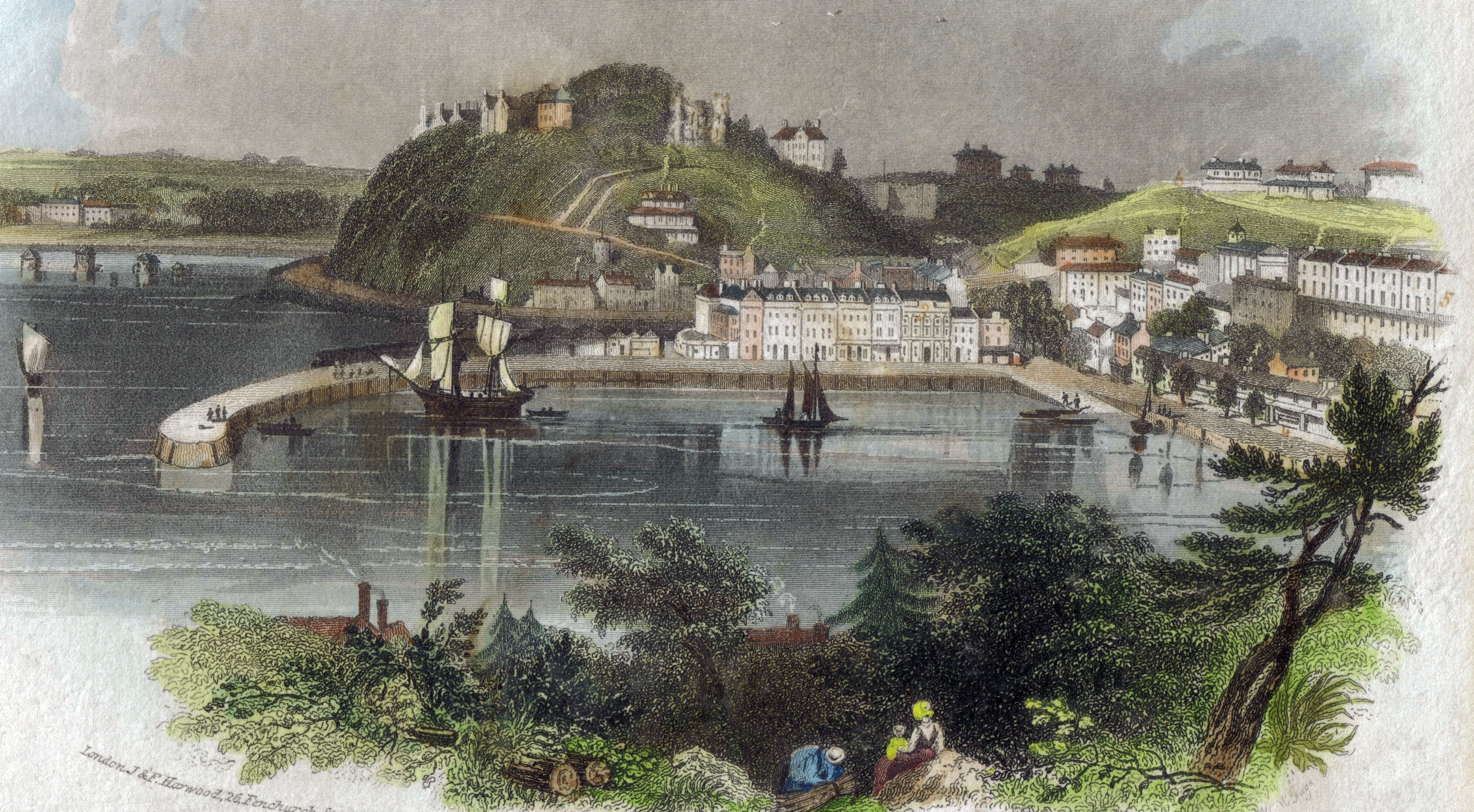
Torquay in 1842

The History of Torquay, a town in Torbay, on the south- east coast of the county of Devon, England, starts some 450,000 years ago with early human artefacts found in Kents Cavern. There is little evidence of any permanent occupation at Torquay until the eleventh century records in the Domesday Book, though it is known that visits were made by Roman soldiers and there was a small Saxon settlement called 'Torre'. In 1196 Torre Abbey was founded here, which by the time of its dissolution in 1539, had become the richest Premonstratensian Monastery in England. The buildings were bought by Sir George Cary in 1662. The Cary family and the Briwere family between them owned much of the land now occupied by Torquay. By the 19th century, most of the land was owned by three families: the Carys, the Palks, and the Mallocks.

There was little development until the early 19th century, when Lawrence Palk, 2nd Baronet built a new harbour here. Much of the later building in the town was done by his solicitor, William Kitson, who was put in charge of the Palk estates in 1833. At this time the town started to attract visitors in ill health as a winter resort because of its fresh air and mild climate. Its population grew by over ten times in the first 50 years of the century. Later in the century, Torquay became a favoured resort for the upper classes. In 1870, Lawrence Palk, 1st Baron Haldon built another new harbour for the town which made it popular with yacht sailors. It was also extensively used for importing coal and wool from Australia.

During the First World War a number of hospitals and convalescent homes were set up in the town. Between the wars, a major advertising campaign by the Great Western Railway ensured that Torquay became a major holiday resort. In World War II, the town, with its preponderance of hotels, provided extensive training facilities for the RAF. From 1944, many American troops were also stationed here. The town was bombed several times.

In 1948 Torquay hosted the watersports events of the Olympic Games. In 1950 the European Broadcasting Union was formed here. More recently the town has become popular with foreign language students, and since the expansion of the EU in 2004, many Polish and Czech workers have settled here.

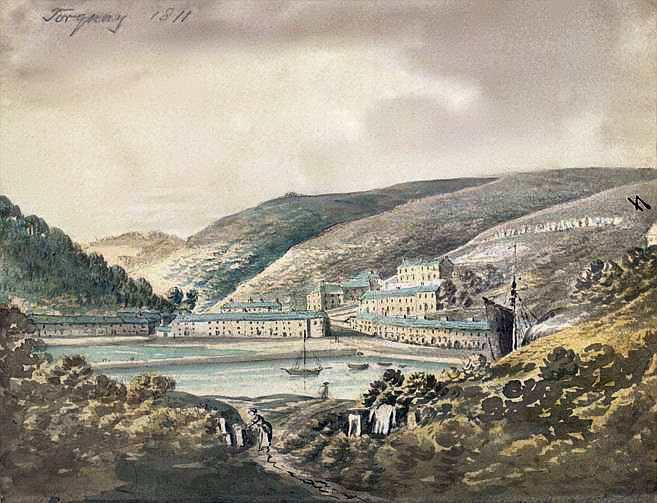
Torquay, 1811

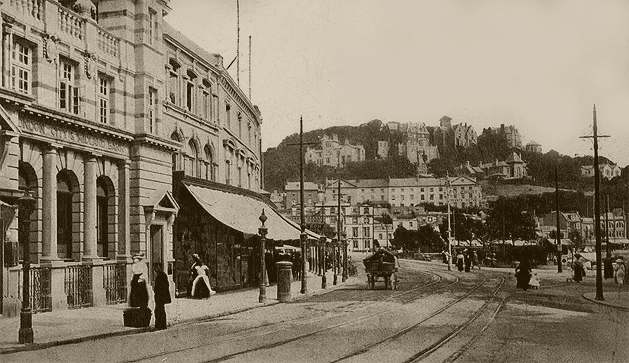
The Strand, 1900

== Before the Norman Conquest ==
The area comprising modern Torquay has been inhabited since Palaeolithic times. Hand axes found in Kents Cavern date to 450,000 years ago, and a maxilla fragment known as Kents Cavern 4 may be oldest example of a modern human in Europe.

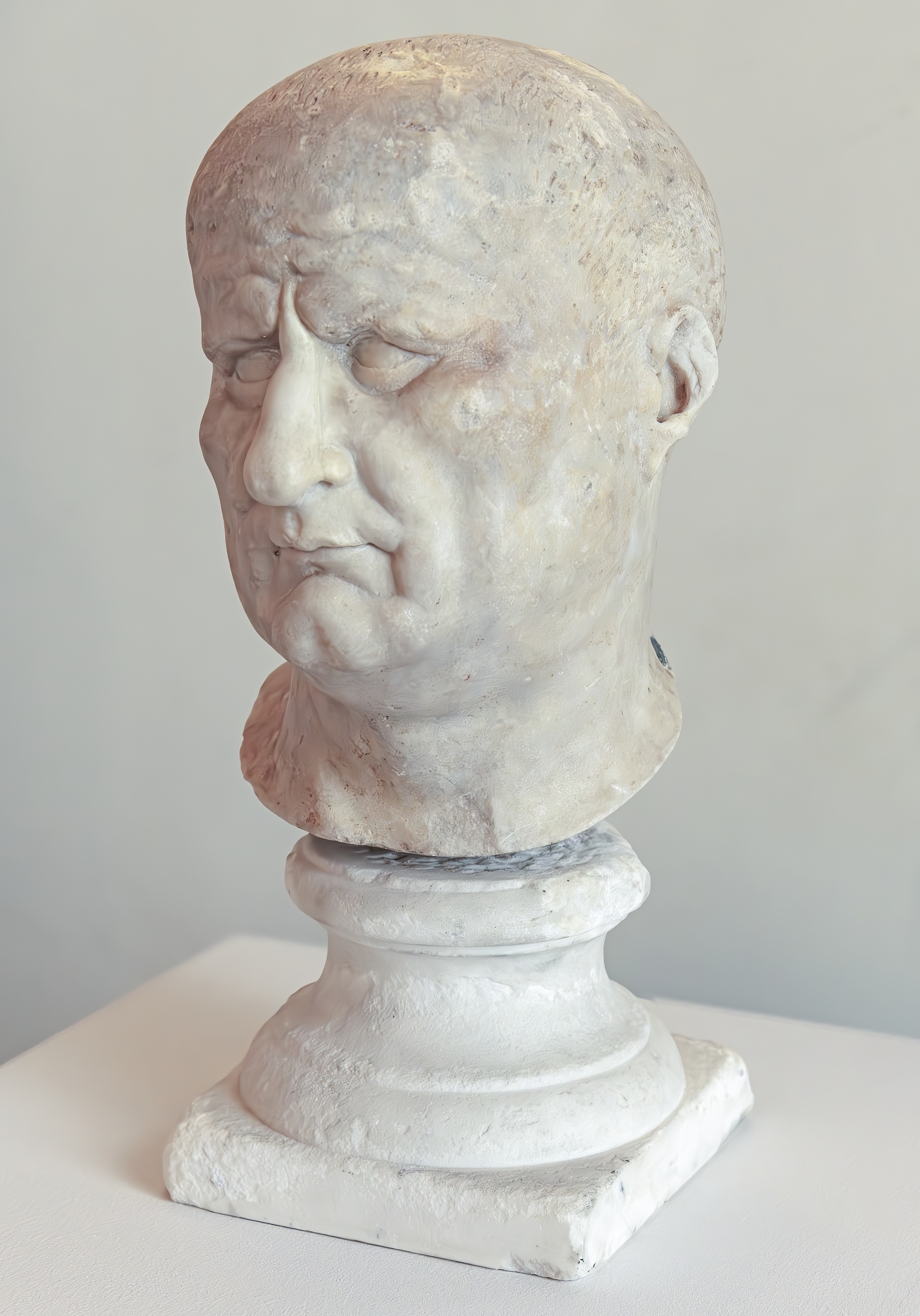
Roman Emperor Vespasian, active in the region of Torquay from 43 to circa 44 AD while in command of the Legio II Augusta

Little is known of its early history until the arrival of the Roman Empire in Britain during the Claudian invasion of 43. Roman soldiers are known to have visited Torquay at some point during this period, leaving offerings at a strange rock formation in Kents Cavern, known as 'The Face'. It is possible these soldiers could have been part of the Legio II Augusta, commanded by the future Emperor Vespasian during the invasion of Britain in 43 considering his extensive actions in the South West, during which according to the Roman historian Suetonius: "He reduced to subjection two powerful nations, more than twenty towns, and the island of Vectis".

No evidence has been found of Roman settlement in the area but Roman finds have been uncovered in nearby Totnes, Newton Abbot and on Berry Head on the opposite side of Torbay existed an Iron Age fort and a cache of Roman coins was discovered in 1730, including among others a coin of the Emperor Claudius which dates the find to the same period as Vespasian's activity in the South West. Furthermore, when construction began on the Belgrave Hotel on Torquay seafront in 1840, workmen discovered evidence of a large road between fifteen and twenty feet wide "consisting of large stones placed end to end and requiring gunpowder to break it up and remove it, such was the strength with which it was built." This road was known locally as the 'calcetum' (Latin for causeway) and is mentioned in a number of Medieval and Early Modern sources as a boundary line between various estates in the town, where people would often meet. Given its size, the quality of its construction and the lack of development in this area of Torquay until the nineteenth century, it is possible these were the remains of a Roman road, as local historians J.T White and Percy Russell have suggested, although no further excavations have taken place due to the site being under Torbay Road. The existence of a Roman road leading out of Isca Dumnoniorum and towards Western Devon crossing the River Teign at Teignbridge some 14 miles north of Torquay also suggests this road could have been part of the Roman road network in the South West of Britannia.

After the departure of the Roman administration from Britain, around 410 AD, a Brythonic kingdom emerged in the West Country based on the old Roman civitas surrounding Exeter. It was called, in Latin, Dumnonia and, in the native Brythonic language, Dyfneint: pronounced "Dove-naynt" and eventually corrupted to Devon, the region in which the modern town of Torquay is situated would have been a part of this Sub-Roman kingdom.

Dumnonia was gradually taken over by the Anglo-Saxon kingdom of Wessex, but the region of Torquay or Torbay received no mention during this time, and although sporadic Viking incursions occurred throughout Devon over the latter Anglo-Saxon era until the Norman Conquest, there is no evidence that the Vikings visited here.

== Medieval and Renaissance era ==
Much of the present town is situated on the ancient manor of Tor Mohun, a possession of William Brewer (died 1226). Various regions in Torquay are mentioned in the Domesday Book, including Cockington or Cochintone as it is described in the book, which was owned by an Anglo Saxon by the name of Alric in the reign of Edward the Confessor and by a Norman under the name of William de Falesia at the time of the book's creation. Maidencombe was the property of an Elmer during the Anglo-Saxon period before passing to Hamond, under William Chievre following the Norman Conquest and St Marychurch or St. Marie Cherche was owned by the Bishop of Exeter throughout the period.

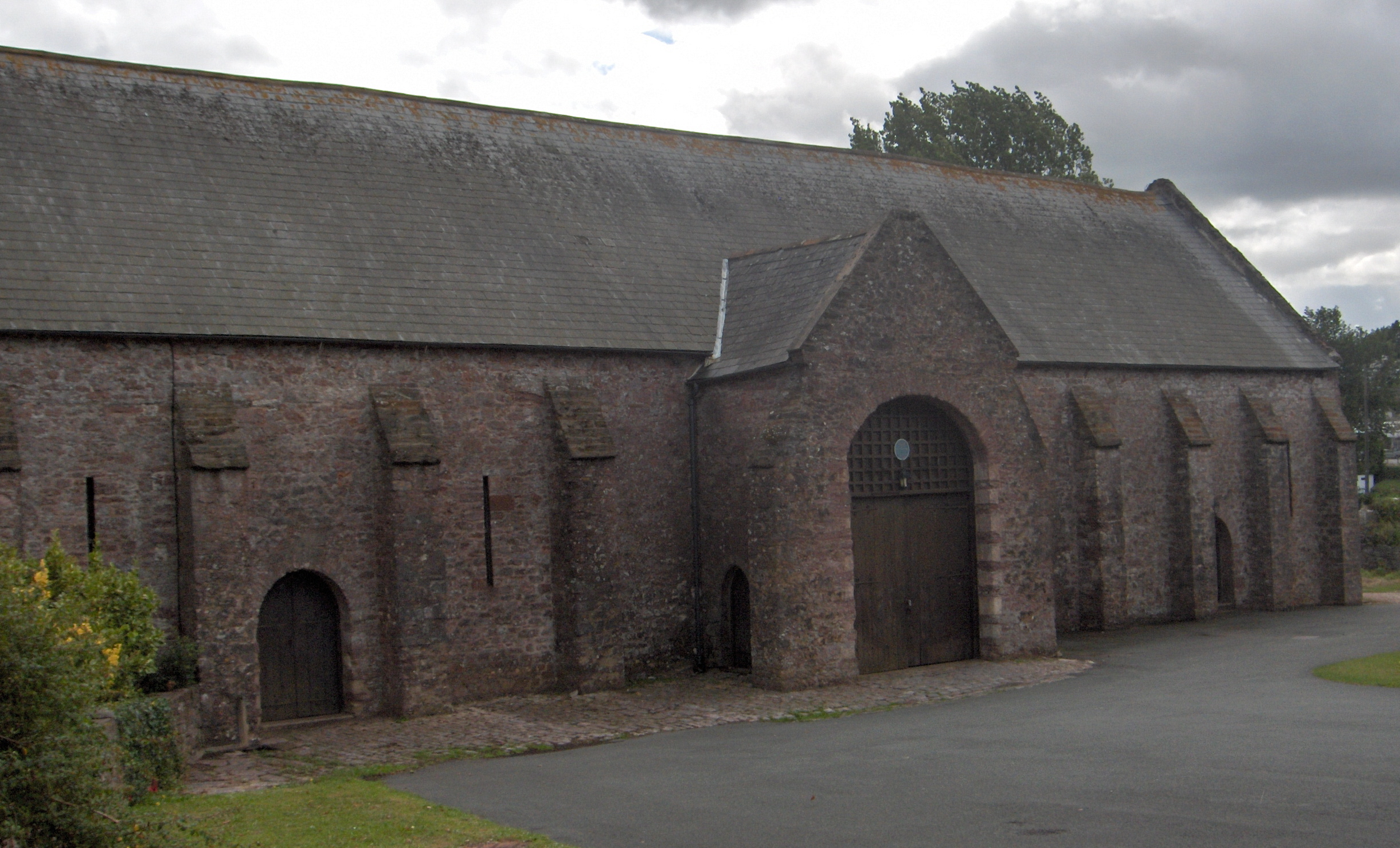
The Spanish Barn used to hold 397 prisoners of war from the Spanish Armada.

In 1196 Torre Abbey was founded as a Premonstratensian Monastery by William Brewer. The abbey owned much land in the area, and by the Dissolution was the richest monastery of its Order in England. The monastery itself was partly built with quarried stone from nearby Corbyn Head under the permission of the De Cockington family of nearby Cockington manor. It remained that way until February 1539 when it suffered the same fate as all other monasteries, surrendering to the ministers of Henry VIII during the dissolution of the monasteries following his split from Rome. The canons of Torre Abbey founded the nearby town of Newton Abbot in the early thirteenth century as the New Town of the Abbots.

Torquay itself developed around the Saxon hamlet of Torre (from 'tor' meaning hill or craggy peak). Water from the River Flete or Fleete (meaning stream) flowed from Barton to the sea and was used to grind corn at Fleet Mill (standing near what is now the main shopping centre at the junction of Union Street and Fleet Walk) until it was demolished in 1835. The monks of Torre Abbey are credited with building the first fishing quay, hence the name Torquay, which evolved through various spellings, including Torrequay and Torkay before settling on the almost modern day version of Tor Quay by 1765. The settlement was originally called Fleet, after the river, but the name Torquay became standard before long.

Torre Abbey was bought by Sir George Cary in 1662 and remained with the family until 1929 when Colonel Lionel Cary died and it was bought by the Torquay Corporation. The Cary family were prominent Torquinians and also owned most of the village of Cockington from as far back as the 14th century which included the modern day areas of Shiphay, Chelston and Livermead within its boundaries. Certain evidence traces the family's ancestry to the son of the Roman Emperor Carus, who served as a general in Britannia during his life.

Although the family lost Cockington after the English Civil War, as Henry Cary sold it to Exeter goldsmith Roger Mallock to cover the debts and heavy fines that were imposed upon the family when Henry raised an army for Charles I during the war, the Carys played a prominent role in the town's development, retaining their remaining holdings in St Marychurch via another branch of the family until Lionel Cary's death.

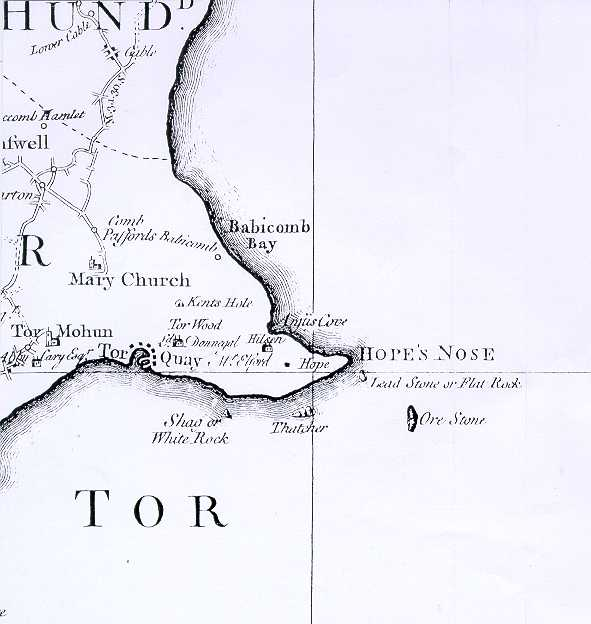
Map of Torquay, 1795 based on Donn's one inch to the mile survey of 1795.

The Tormohun region of the town belonged to William Briwere, or Brewer, during this period. Briwere was a powerful baron in the reigns of Henry II, Richard I, John, and Henry III, until the marriage of his younger daughter and co-heiress brought the ownership of Tormohun to the Mohun family thus forming the basis for its future name of Tor Mohun. The land was given to Torre Abbey by John de Mohun in the years following the Black Death. In 1540 Tormohun was purchased by John Ridgway, whose grandson, Thomas, was created a baronet in 1612, in 1616 the Lord Ridgway and finally in 1622, Earl of Londonderry, making Tormohun the seat of the Earls of Londonderry until its sale to the Palk family.

In 1521, a William Cary of the Cockington Carys married Mary Boleyn, the sister of Henry VIII's second wife Anne Boleyn and thus became the uncle of the future Queen Elizabeth I when Anne Boleyn gave birth in 1533.

After the failed Spanish Armada of 1588 during the Anglo-Spanish War, a medieval barn belonging to Torre Abbey was used to house 397 Spanish prisoners of war and in recognition of this the building was named the "Spanish Barn".

In 1605 a resident of the Cockington area, George Waymouth, explored the coastline of Maine and caused a sensation when he returned to Plymouth with a group of Native Americans.

Almost exactly 100 years after the failed armada of the King of Spain, William III landed at Brixham in Torbay on 5 November 1688 before passing through Torquay during his march to London, on his way to gain control of the country in the 'Glorious Revolution'. Rawlyn Mallock MP of the Cockington Mallocks was one of the small band of peers to greet him.

In 1785 the Keyberry Turnpike Trust opened the road from Barton to Newton Bushell (Abbot), increasing contact between the nascent towns and the regional capital of Exeter.

== Napoleonic Wars and early development ==
An early visitor to Torquay in 1794 is recorded as saying "Instead of the poor uncomfortable village we had expected, how great was our surprise at seeing a pretty range of neat new buildings, fitted up for summer visitors, visitors here can enjoy carriage rides, bathing, retirement and a most romantic situation". Another early visitor exclaimed "It is not England, but a bit of sunny Italy taken bodily from its rugged coast and placed here amid the green places and the pleasant pastoral lanes of beautiful Devon'."

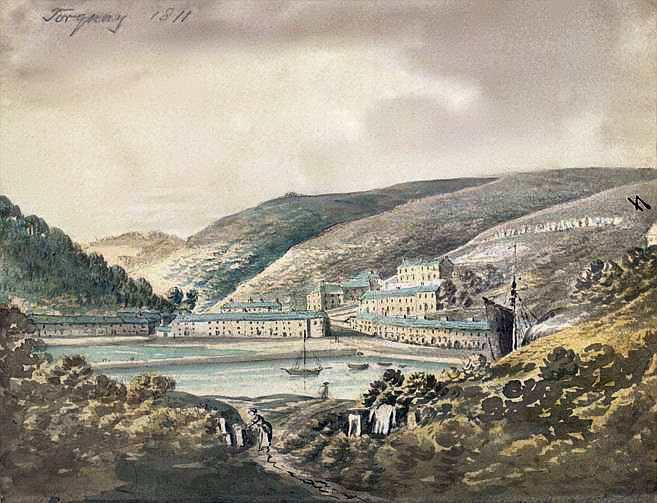
Torquay, 1811

Torquay owes much to Napoleon Bonaparte, the Napoleonic Wars meant that the rich elite could no longer visit continental Europe and looked for local destinations to visit instead. Torbay, the large bay of which Torquay is located on the northern side of, alongside the other towns of Paignton and Brixham, was ideal as a large sheltered anchorage for ships and was frequently used by the Channel Fleet which protected England against invasion by Napoleon and due to this wives and relatives of officers often visited Torquay to be near their loved ones in the fleet. During this period the Royal Navy ship HMS Venerable was wrecked while sheltering in the bay on 24 November 1804.

Torquay's initial development owes a great deal to the efforts of Sir Lawrence Palk, 2nd Baronet, owner of the manor of Tormohun. It was on his initiative that the first real development in the town commenced taking the form of the erection of a new harbour to replace the dilapidated old harbour, for which an Act of Parliament was required. The work commenced in 1803, was completed in 1807, and was designed by John Rennie who later designed London Bridge. Proposals were also put forth for the construction of a canal to Newton Abbot at the same time as the harbour development, but nothing came of this. The entire cost of the work was estimated at £27,000, a costly sum in the mid nineteenth century.

During this period the first town plans for the area were drawn up for Palk and after a Grand Tour of Europe, Palk brought back from Italy architectural ideas which he incorporated into his villa designs. These designs were brought into fruition by "the Maker of Torquay", William Kitson, who became chairman of the newly formed local council, acting on behalf of the absentee landlord Palk. As a result of these plans, an exclusive residential area was created in the Warberries and Lincombes which retains its character today with several of these original properties still standing among the tree-clad hills, notably Hesketh Crescent. Completed in 1848 with its sweeping Regency façade it was described as the "finest crescent of houses in the West of England".

After Napoleon was captured following the Battle of Waterloo he was held on the warship HMS Bellerophon, nicknamed Billy Ruffian in Torbay for two days. Upon his first sight of the Bay the former Emperor has been quoted as exclaiming "Quel Bon Pays" ("what a lovely country") and he compared it favourably to Porto Ferrago on Elba. Napoleon also helped the prosperity of Torquay in another way: local smugglers did very good business 'importing' French brandy during the Napoleonic Wars and since then smuggling of one kind or another has not completely stopped. It was during these wars that Admiral Nelson visited the town on 18 January 1801, visiting Torre Abbey Mansions and later dining in Cockington.

== A nascent holiday resort (1821–1848) ==
In 1821 there were still fewer than 2,000 people living in Torquay, but it was to experience a massive rate of growth in coming years. In 1822 Torquay's second hotel was opened on the site of the modern day Queen's Hotel, despite objections raised by the Vicar of Torre who believed that "Two hotels in the town would be detrimental to its moral health".

The atmosphere of these years is well conveyed in Octavian Blewitt's book A Panorama of Torquay, published in 1832. He tells us, among other things, that those who wished to avoid the fatigue of the long coach journey from London, travelled to Portsmouth by coach and there took the Brunswick "a steam vessel of considerable power" directly to Torquay.

In 1832 Torquay acquired its first bank, The Torbay Bank, run by William Kitson, already a partner in the town's premier solicitors Messrs Abraham and Kitson, founded in 1823 and soon to be land agent of the Palk family. In the same year, when future British Prime Minister William Ewart Gladstone was staying in the town, he was summoned to fight the election in Newark for the Conservative Party and the journey north to Nottinghamshire took him three days by coach.

Throughout the 1830s and 1840s Kitson shaped the way that Torquay developed to such an extent that he is known to this day as the 'Maker of Torquay', acting in the place of the absentee Palk who had by now fled to Dieppe to avoid debts. Kitson was essentially given free hand to develop Torquay along his own line after being put in charge of the Palk estates in 1833. Alongside his roles as a banker, solicitor and manager of the Palk's affairs, he was elected as commissioner to an early form of local government in 1835, where he introduced many basic amenities to the town such as most of the central road network of the town, a sewer system, a regulated water supply and street lighting.

In 1833, Princess Victoria visited the town for the first time, with modern-day Victoria Parade named in honour of the place where the future queen first stepped ashore. At this time, the mild winter climate and fresh air in Torquay attracted many visitors in ill health who visited the town for its apparent cleansing nature and the town started to develop as a health resort for the wealthy rather than its former naval character. It retained this new character for the rest of the century. The town's increasing popularity caused the population to grow from 838 in 1801 to 11,474 in 1851 and by 1850 there were about 2,000 bedrooms in the small hotels of Torquay.

During this period, the town was mostly owned by three families: the Mallocks who owned the Cockington region, the Carys who owned Babbacombe, St Marychurch and the old monastery at Torre Abbey, and the Palk family which owned central Torquay or Tormohun. Tor Mohun takes its name from the tor or conspicuous hill known as Tor Hill today, and its suffix from the Mohuns who acquired the manor from the Brewers in the 13th century. The Mallocks resisted the changes convulsing Torquay for a long time because they did not want a town on their rural property, and they threw away a fortune rather than have it. It was not until 1865 that one of them consented to grant a building lease, and that only to a family connection.

In the 1840s, Lauriston House was built by Sir John Theophilus Lee with Italianate gardens, on the present day St Efride's Road. The building served as a hospital and a school but was destroyed by bombing in 1942. The arches of the gardens survive.

== Disturbances and continued growth (mid-19th century) ==
In the 1840s railway mania hit Torquay, it is difficult for us now to imagine how important railways were to the 19th century, perhaps the situation was best described by a noted English historian G.M. Trevelyan who wrote: "The railways were England's gift to the world." In fact, a large proportion of the world's trains still roll along tracks manufactured in the last century with the words 'Made in Birmingham' stamped on them.

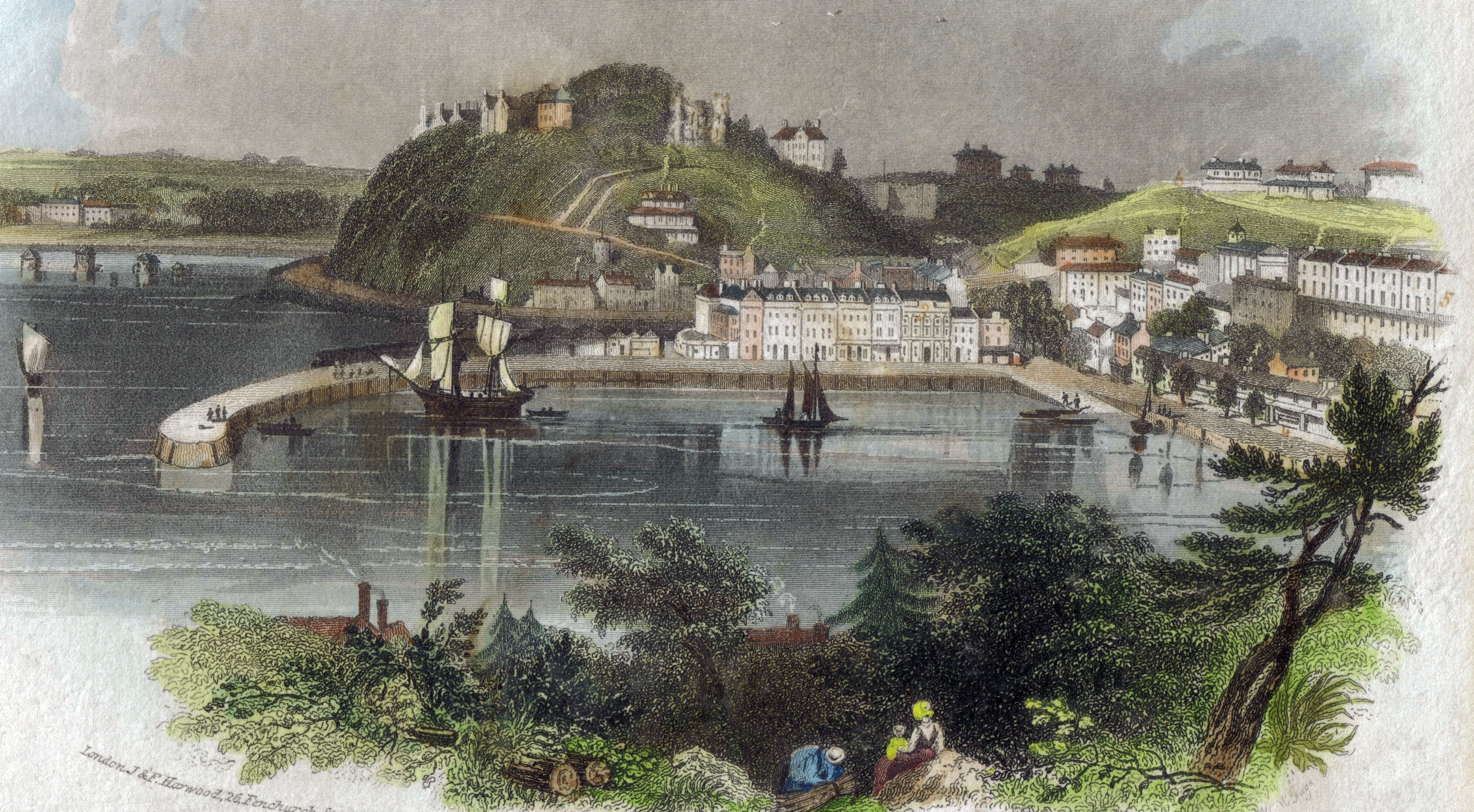
Torquay, 1842

The people of Torquay knew that the railways would bring visitors and prosperity and they wanted the railway to come to their town. Finally, on 18 December 1848, Torre railway station (some distance from the sea) was opened and Torquay was connected to the rest of the country for the first time in its history. By 1850 the town was calling itself "The Queen of Watering Places" and "The Montpellier of England". Between 1841 and 1871, the population of the town rose by over 5,000 in each decade.

On a Saturday morning in 1852 a town meeting decided to continue the railway down to the sea, to the harbour. The people at the meeting imagined Torquay as an industrial town, importing raw materials through the harbour and transporting finished articles inland. This decision caused great controversy, and in the afternoon of the same day another meeting was held cancelling the decision of the morning and deciding to continue the railway to the sea but not to the harbour. As a result, Torquay kept its character as a tourist town and became the place it is today. The new railway station was opened on 2 August 1859 with the line to Paignton, but remained a distance away from the town centre and harbourside, although ideally placed for Torre Abbey Sands.

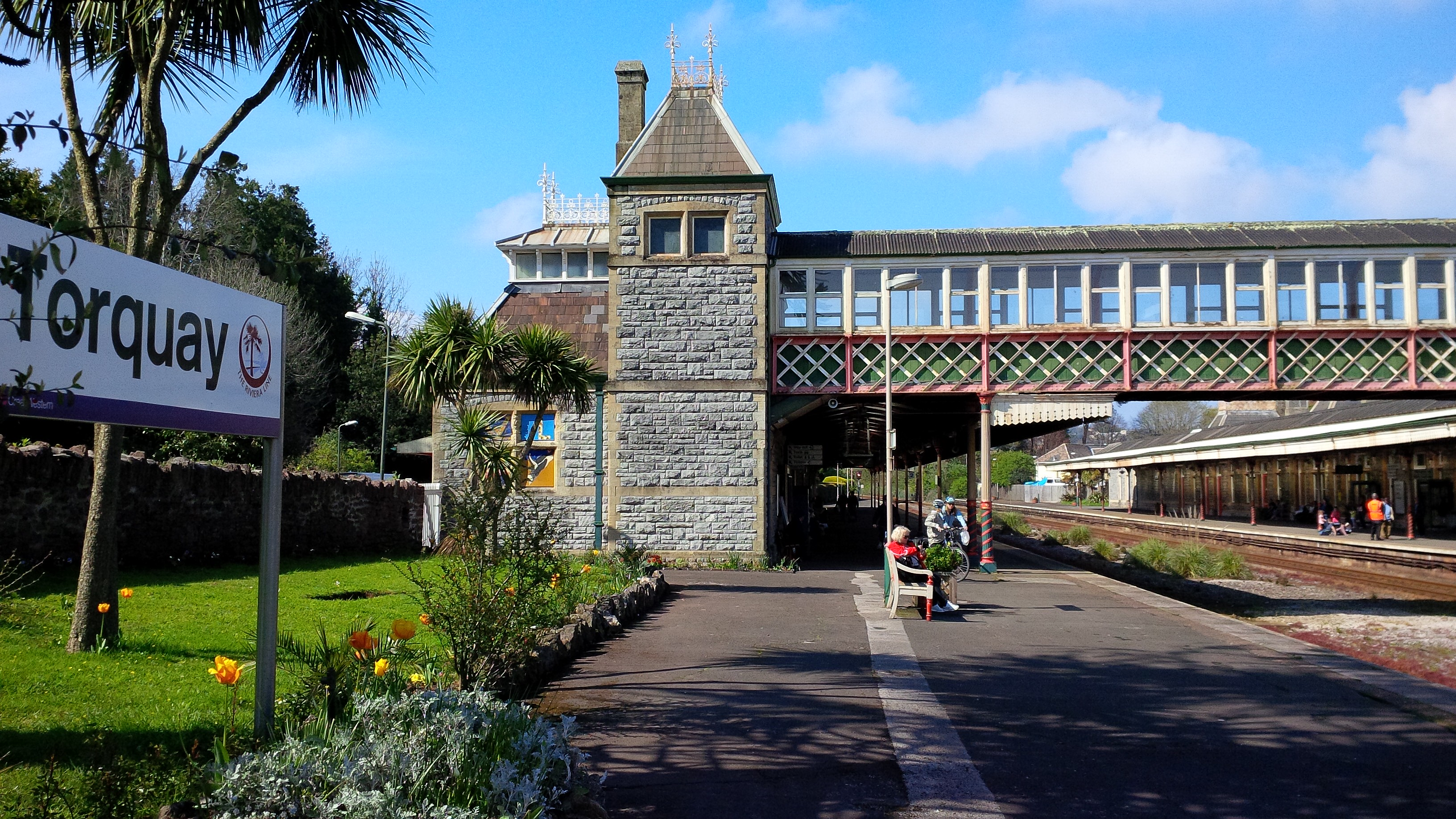
Torquay Station

The railways also had a great effect on the surrounding towns and countryside, and as the years passed Torquay grew in importance because of its railway links, to the detriment of many of the formerly important towns of Devon as the trains passed by them without stopping, taking their former prosperity with them. Within decades these towns had died economically and their populations migrated away, many to the growing conurbation of Torquay boosting its population further.

Isambard Kingdom Brunel was an important figure in Torquay's history during this period, he built the nearby Atmospheric railway and the rail links to Torquay, and had begun buying up large areas of the Watcombe district of Torquay where he had planned to retire in his old age, but he died early and never reached his retirement.

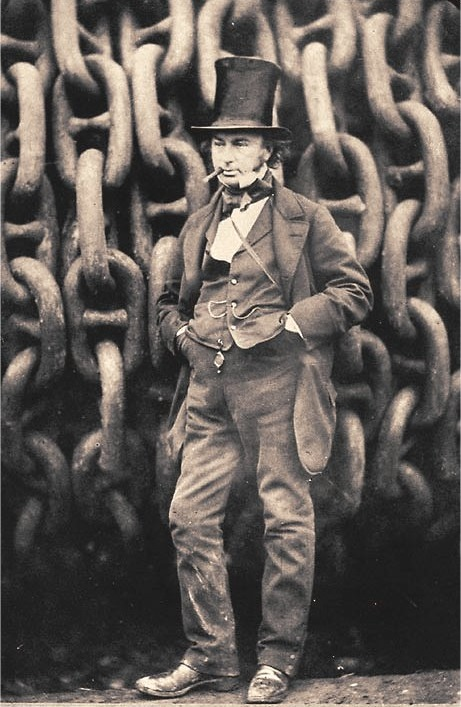
Isambard Kingdom Brunel, the legendary British industrialist planned to retire to Torquay and bought up large areas of land in the town, now known as Brunel Woods

While the well-to-do and privileged enjoyed life in the Lincombes and Warberries and other desirable locations with pleasing vistas, the labouring classes of Torquay lived below in overcrowded tenements, such as in George Street, Swan Street and Pimlico. These foetid dwellings in alleyways with open sewers were the homes of the unemployed and the domestic servants, labourers, artisans and others who, although they made the town tick, had to live in conditions where hunger and sanitary problems were a constant threat. In one year 66 people died in six weeks in a cholera epidemic.

Many Devonians emigrated, with the sailing ships Elizabeth, Isabella and Margaret taking emigrants from Torquay Harbour to America and Canada. Those who remained faced low pay in insecure employment with few rights. The basic diet of working-class families at the time consisted mainly of bread and whatever else could be had, usually cheese and a few vegetables, so when the staple food supply was scarce or too expensive to buy, survival was made harder.

In 1846 the potato crop failed and there was a bad harvest, resulting in the price of bread going up steeply and causing 'a great distress among the poor', especially in Ireland where famine followed. But while affluent Torquinians collected over £4,000 for the relief of the Irish, many Devonians were less than happy about their own situation and decided to do something about it. Rumours of disturbances had spread around the town but no heed had been taken, so when at 7.30 p.m. on 17 May a crowd assembled in Lower Union Street the authorities were caught off guard as attacks were made on bakers' shops and women carried off the spoils in their aprons. As night drew on the rioters took advantage of the dark.

Several thousand 'roughs' then swarmed down Fleet Street and attacked other shops, smashing shutters and windows as they went. Then they turned and marched to Torre, at the top of the town, before they were finally challenged by a posse of tradesmen headed by two magistrates. During the ensuing violent confrontation the Riot Act was read and those who had been taken prisoner were locked up in the Town Hall. The following day a party of 60 navvies who were working on the railway just outside Torquay marched down to the Town Hall to free their comrades who had been arrested. After a tense standoff their leader, James Hart, was seized and coastguards and 40 members of the 5th Fusiliers, just arrived from Exeter, helped restore order.

A report in the Torquay and Tor Directory on 21 May 1847 accepted that 'the high price of provisions' had provoked the disturbances, but displayed little magnanimity in claiming that 'steps had been taken for relieving the sufferings of the poor and it will be far more grateful to the right-minded poor to know that the relief which we trust will shortly be afforded to them was not exacted by intimidation, but voluntarily determined upon before'. A handbill circulated at the same time, headed 'To The Poor of Tor and Torquay', informed them that the crop failures were down to His hand, and that they should put their faith in 'God's Providence'.

In January 1854, further rioting occurred at Barnstaple, Tiverton and Exeter, when the military was called out again. Trouble had been anticipated in Torquay but this time the magistrates took the precautions to nip it in the bud, though five years later an attempt was made to burn down the Town Hall.

There was a gruesome footnote to the 1847 riot when, in 1863, a shallow grave was found in the Torre area containing the remains of a young man who was said to have been killed on that fateful night 16 years earlier and in the following year two more skeletons were unearthed in the town.

== Torquay's golden age (late 19th century) ==
With the town becoming increasingly popular amongst the rich and privileged of Europe it started attracting more prestigious visitors, the Russian Romanoff noble family built themselves a private holiday home in the town called the Villa Syracusa (now The Headland Hotel) at which they would often entertain. While the Romanoff family was in residence, they entertained the Russian Royal Family at the Villa. During their absences, the villa was often let privately. In August 1864 the Prince of Wales visited the Grand Duchess Maria of Russia while she was staying at the Villa Syracusa, amongst her party staying at the villa was the Count Gregoire Stroganoff and Countess Alexandra Tolstoy, the daughter of noted novelist Leo Tolstoy.

On 31 July 1850 Prince and Princess Peter of Oldenburg, their five children and retinue arrived in Torquay by express train, having first been received at Osborne House, Isle of Wight, by their cousin, Queen Victoria. Prince Peter of Oldenburg was also a cousin of the Russian Tsar Alexander II and was widely known as a great philanthropist and patron of many hospitals in Russia. As such, he was invited to lay the foundation stone of the new Torbay Infirmary (later Torbay Hospital) at Union Street, Torquay. Following a service at Upton Church, the ceremony took place on Saturday 24 August 1850, and the architect, Mr Harvey, presented the Prince with an 'elegant silver trowel with handle of Torquay Madrepore' before the 'massive stone was lowered by machinery into place'. The Royal party stayed at Villa Borghese [the first Italianate villa to be built in Torquay], Higher Lincombe Road until 11 September 1850. An historic Blue Plaque was unveiled at the Villa Borghese by Torbay Civic Society on 31 July 2014.

The Imperial Hotel also accommodated many famous guests during this period, including Emperor Napoleon III of France, the Queen of the Netherlands and King Edward VII. Benjamin Disraeli was a prominent visitor to the resort through his political career. After the railway came to Torquay in 1859 many new villas were built in the Torre area. One of the earliest was Howden Court constructed in 1860.

Growth slowed up in the 1870s and 1880s, mainly because the upper classes, for whom Torquay catered to the exclusion of all others, now began to take their summer and winter holidays abroad. Meanwhile, the adjacent parish of St. Marychurch, had taken the overflow of Torquay, and had grown from 800 people at the beginning of the century to nearly 7,000 at the end. In the same period, Cockington had been transformed, in a milder degree, from a deep country parish to a villa-strewn suburb, though the old village remained untouched. In 1870 Lawrence Palk, 1st Baron Haldon commissioned the building of a new harbour in Torquay, which made the town popular amongst yacht sailors. Whilst not as commercial as nearby Brixham, the harbour at Torquay was heavily involved in importing coal and wool from Australia, which was then sent to the mills in the North of England. The upper class nature of the resort and the huge wealth of its residents during this period was further established when Worth's Tourist Guide To Devonshire (1886) declared of Torquay "in proportion to its population [it is] the wealthiest town in England".

Edward Cardwell, 1st Viscount Cardwell, the MP who reformed the British military after the Crimean War, was a prominent resident of Torquay during his latter years and died in the town on 15 February 1886. In later years Queen Victoria reviewed the entire Royal Navy in the waters of Torbay.

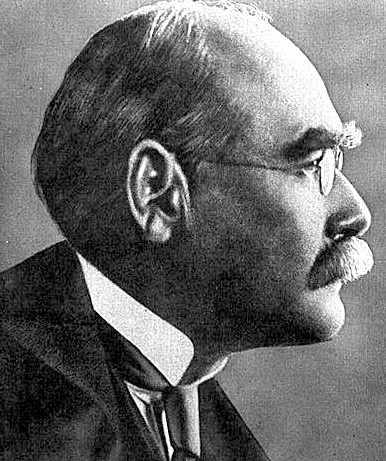
Rudyard Kipling, the famous novelist was a resident of Torquay for a brief period in 1896.

During this period, Torquay attracted a number of literary talents whose works reflected their stay in the town, Charles Kingsley, author of The Water Babies and Westward Ho! (novel) lived in the Livermead region of the town. Elizabeth Barrett Browning settled in Torquay in 1838 for health reasons and during her time in the bay she wrote literary work such as De Profundis and The Cry of the Children. Rudyard Kipling lived at Rock House, Maidencombe, in 1896 following a stressful period in his life. The building is thought to have been his inspiration for his story The House Surgeon in 1909. Furthermore, two classic pieces of English literature Oscar Wilde's A Woman of No Importance and Sir Arthur Conan Doyle's The Hound of the Baskervilles are reported to have been created while staying in Torquay. Finally Charles Darwin completed the last sections of The Origin of Species while staying at Hesketh Crescent in the Ilsham area of Torquay.

The next few years saw development in the recreational landscape of Torquay, with the town's first sporting arena, the Recreation Ground being opened in 1888 with a rugby match between Torquay Athletic and local rivals Newton Abbot. Then in 1889 the Winter Gardens were built to provide entertainment for winter holidaymakers. Its cast-iron and glass structure could seat up to 1,000 people for the concerts held by an Italian band, and also featured three tennis courts and a bowling alley. However, the Winter Gardens were not very successful and in 1903 the building was sold to Great Yarmouth. The structure was shipped by barge from Torquay without the loss of a single pane of glass and is still in use today (including a brief period during the 1990s as a night club, under the management of comedian Jim Davidson). The Victorian walls of the base are still in their original position in Torquay, and are now the walls of the bar (griffin Bar) open to the public under the Yardley Manor Hotel, on Museum Road.

Crime writer Agatha Christie was born in the town on 15 September 1890, and was christened at All Saints Church, Bamfylde Rd, Torre on 20 October 1890. She based many of her novels in a thinly veiled version of Torquay.

In 1892 two events took place which radically changed both the appearance and outlook of Torquay: through trains were introduced, and Torquay was granted borough status by a Royal Charter, adopting the motto Salus et Felicitas (Health and Happiness). The town was now ready for expansion and to start building a new image, the healthy were encouraged to come as well as the ailing and the Victorian watering place soon transformed into a holiday resort.

In 1899 the town acquired its first professional sports team with the founding of Torquay United Football Club by a group of school leavers under the guidance of Sergeant-Major Edward Tomney. After a season of friendly matches the club joined the East Devon League and moved into the Recreation Ground, their home for the next four years. They went on to join the Football League in 1927.

== Early 20th century ==
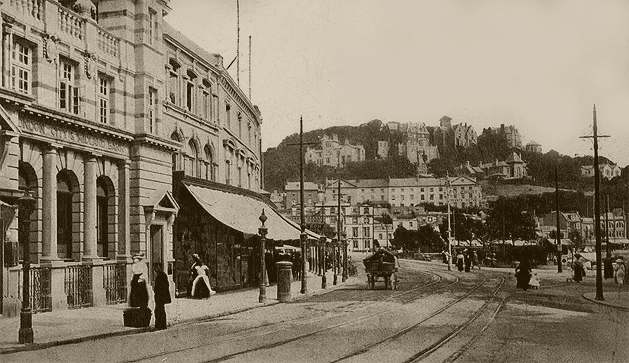
The Strand, 1900

The early part of the new century saw a change in the character of the town: in 1902 the first advertising campaign to bring healthy visitors to Torquay, rather than people recovering from illnesses was launched and Torquay changed from being a winter holiday resort to being a summer holiday resort aimed at families from the industrial Midlands and north of England. This led to a steady increase in rail traffic until the advent of World War I.

Torquay had been steadily increasing in size over this period and in 1900 the regions of Chelston and Livermead, previously part of the Cockington estate owned by the Mallocks had been annexed by the town and 1903 saw further expansion of Torquay's political size and power, as the former borough of St Marychurch was amalgamated into the town, having long since been residentially and commercially intermingled with the town due to its rapid expansion in the latter half of the past century. Rumour has it the catalyst for the merger was that Torquay wanted a steamroller and could not afford its own, unlike its smaller neighbour, however this has never been verified.

Finally in 1928 Cockington itself was integrated within the town borders and with this expansion the political entity of Torquay now covered more than twice the size as previously, incorporating the modern day regions of Livermead, Cockington, Chelston St Marychurch, Plainmoor, Babbacombe, Watcombe and Maidencombe, as well as the historical core of the town. It has largely maintained this outline to the modern day, aside from the post World War II developments of Hele Village and Shiphay and the development of the industrial and residential estate of The Willows on the outskirts of the town throughout the 1990s and early 21st century.

World-renowned electrical engineer, mathematician, and physicist Oliver Heaviside lived in the town from 1909 until his death in 1924, after moving from nearby Newton Abbot due to failing health.

In 1905 over 113 warships of the Royal Navy anchored in the bay in an awe-inspiring sight and the Royal Family and the Royal Navy once again descended on the town, as King George V reviewed the Home Fleet in the waters of the bay, before war broke out with Germany and Austria-Hungary in mid 1914.

== World War I ==
=== 1914 ===
In the early days of the war while patriotism was still high and many believed it would be over by Christmas, many volunteers signed on for military service and columns of young men were seen marching through the town following recruiting campaigns on their way to Northern France and Belgium.

As the war progressed Torquay began to see the effects of it, and in August 1914, the Red Cross Hospital opened in the Town Hall with 50 beds and the first convoy of wounded arrived on 21 October 'when a hospital-train arrived at Torre station with eight British officers and 40 wounded men from France.' The officers went to Stoodley Knowle, owned by Torquay's MP Colonel Burn, but they were greeted by the Hon. Mrs Burn and Miss Burn "who were attired as Red Cross nurses." In addition to Stoodley Knowle, other war hospitals were set up at the Mount (but later moved to Rockwood); the Manor House (Lady Layland-Barratt); Lyncourt (Hon. Helen Cubitt) and the "Western Hospital for Consumptives". There was also a home at Royden, described as a "Convalescent Home for Blinded Soldiers and Sailors". In the latter part of the year during November, Queen Mary visited the Town Hall and Oldway Mansions while visiting injured servicemen.

One of the units which was later to be involved in the ill-fated attack on Gallipoli arrived in the town in December: the 1,100 men of the Royal Dublin Fusiliers had been relocated from the naval port of Plymouth and before they left the town for the front lines, their commanding officer, Lieutenant-Colonel Rooth, handed over the regimental colours to the town Mayor for safe-keeping. They did not go to France as was expected, but were reassigned to be part of the attack against the Ottoman Empire. During this period recruits for Lord Kitchener's New Army, men of the Royal Army Medical Corps, had been flooding into the town and were a large presence during the Christmas of 1914.

=== 1915 ===
In September King George V and Queen Mary visited the Town Hall and Stoodley Knowle hospitals where they saw wounded soldiers from the campaigns in France, Flanders and Gallipoli. There were then five hospitals, two of which "flew the Red Cross Flag" (the Town Hall and Rockwood). By this time the Western Hospital had become the "Auxiliary Military Hospital" (with an annexe at Underwood).

There were so many casualties that the Torbay Hospital had allocated more than 50 beds for war wounded. The civilian population was also caught up in the struggle for men to serve in France after those, and other, battles. The Torquay Local Tribunal was set up to hear cases of local men seeking deferment, which was granted only on grounds deemed to be good.

=== 1917 ===
From May onwards wounded soldiers from the New Zealand Expeditionary Force began to arrive and entered a permanent convalescent camp at St Marychurch, a "Special YMCA" being opened for their use.

=== 1918 ===
The continuing presence of the New Zealanders resulted in the opening of a YMCA in Torquay at Maycliff in St. Luke's Road in April and, a month later, the Kia Toa Club (now the Victorian Arcade) for those awaiting repatriation. The Council gave each serviceman "suitably inscribed views of Torquay"; in all, 22,000 were distributed.

New Zealand Troops in Torquay, 1918

Many of the New Zealanders sailed home in SS Ruahine which was anchored well out in the Bay.

September 1918 saw a serious outbreak of the Spanish flu which was ravaging the world at the time, over 100 American servicemen died at the Oldway Hospital in a fortnight from the disease; they were buried in Paignton cemetery, but were later exhumed and taken back to the United States.

Armistice was declared on 11 November and some weeks later there was excitement at the harbour when the German submarine U-161 arrived while British 'water-planes flew in the air [and] descended on to the water' (possibly an early example of the 'victory roll'). These were seaplanes from the base on Beacon Quay which had been there throughout the War, the Coastlines shed being altered for use as a hangar. It was operated by the RNAS with Short 184 seaplanes but became "No. 239 Squadron RAF" after the amalgamation of the RFC and RNAS in April.

The final act to Torquay's war experience was on Boxing Day 1918 when the town mayor handed back the regimental colours of the Dubliners to a Guard from the 1st Dublin Fusiliers, the colours having hung in the Council Chamber for four years. Out of a battalion 1,100 strong that had arrived in Torquay a few years ago, only 40 were left: the regiment having been decimated at the Landing at Suvla Bay during the Gallipoli campaign.

== Inter war period ==
After the Great War an effective advertising campaign by the Great Western Railway Company was responsible for making Torquay a major resort. In 1924 Torquay hosted the International Summer School of the Anthroposophy Society, which event was widely covered in the local press and was the final visit by the Austrian philosopher Rudolf Steiner to Britain. The interest in Torquay culminated on August Bank Holiday in 1938, just before the outbreak of World War II, when 20,000 passengers arrived in Torquay station, followed by 50 trains the next day.

During this period Torquay also encountered political developments. In 1926, the former Liberal MP for Chertsey Francis John Marnham served a one-year term as Mayor of Torquay; it was one of the rare occasions when the Town Council selected a chief magistrate from outside its own members. A few years later, Oswald Mosley's British Union of Fascists attempted to move into the region following great success in the city of Plymouth where the Union had upwards of 1,500 members in 1933, and Mosley spoke to packed meetings in Plymouth's Guildhall and the Drill Hall in Millbay to great acclaim. However, the Torquay branch of the Fascists never took off to the same extent and at its peak in 1933 only had 34 members. By 1935 it had been absorbed back into the Plymouth branch.

An odd coincidence with the growth of the fascist party in Torquay, was the presence of A.K. Chesterton as editor of the Torquay Times. Chesterton played a prominent role in far right-wing British politics over the next three decades, founding the League of Empire Loyalists and co-founding the National Front which is still active in modern times and he was a prominent figure in the Fascist Union before a schism with Mosley and his departure in 1938. However, during the period of Fascist activity in the resort Chesterton had already departed for London and appears to have played little part in the fascist attempt to cultivate support in the town.

== World War II ==
=== 1939 ===
Although training in 'air-raid precautions' started as early as 1935, recruiting only began in earnest in January 1939. Wardens were recruited and every house in the town was visited, with between 20,000 and 30,000 civilian gas respirators fitted. In March the Torbay ARP Committee purchased Upton Primary School as headquarters for the Torbay Area at a cost of £3,350. Trained volunteers totalled 2,033 and there were then on order 2,200 sandbags, 200 suits of clothing, 69,000 respirators and 140 steel helmets with 'the Home Office waiting for an address to send them to'.

On 1 September, two days before war was declared, permanent 'Wardens' Posts' were established and sand-bagged throughout the town; eight days later the first air-raid exercise took place, simulating a German attack in which a mustard gas bomb was dropped in St. Marks Road.

Within days of the declaration of war, plans were announced for rationing meat and petrol throughout the country. Petrol ration books covered two months, but did not say how much each coupon would be worth. Coal and coke rationing were added to the list before the end of the month.

The town's Wardens went from house to house preparing residents for wearing their respirators in case of an attack with poisonous gas. In late September 1939 the 'Food Control Office' opened in the Electric Hall (later AMF Bowling). 'Registration Day' was on 29 September; every inhabitant received a Registration Card with a unique number.

In October, the Palace Hotel was requisitioned by the government and opened as a convalescent hospital and training facility for RAF officers, originally with 48 beds but soon expanded to nearly 250. It was later renamed RAF Hospital Torquay. Until it was bombed in October 1942, many aircrew recovered and trained there, including James Nicolson, the only Battle of Britain pilot and the only pilot of RAF Fighter Command to be awarded the VC.

=== 1940 ===
In 1940 Wrighton of Walthamstow took over Sansom's garage opposite the Chilcote Memorial; up to 300 people worked there manufacturing aircraft parts (including for the Short Sunderland flying-boat) for the war effort. After the Fall of France the invasion of Britain became a real possibility, and machine-gun posts and pillboxes were built across the coastline of Torquay and the Bay. In Torquay the work was done by the Royal East Kent Regiment nicknamed 'The Buffs'. Naval guns were placed on Corbyn Head, in a repeat of its fortification against the troops of Napoleon over a century before.

In May Secretary of State for War Anthony Eden made his historic broadcast appeal asking those men between the ages of 17 and 65 who were not already on War Service to join the Local Defence Volunteers; they would be unpaid, but would wear uniforms and be armed. In two days 400 men had joined, and by Monday the 20th the register had closed with 600 on the books. In July the name was changed to the Home Guard.

Torquay provided hotel buildings for the RAF to train aircrew. In addition to the previously mentioned RAF Hospital at the Palace Hotel, No 1 ITW (Initial Training Wing) was formed at Babbacombe in June 1940. Headquarters were at the Norcliffe Hotel, the Sefton, Oswalds, Trecarn, Foxlands and Palermo Hotels being used for sleeping, etc. Postings were made from Babbacombe to Elementary Flying Training Schools (including overseas in Canada and Southern Rhodesia) where they became pilots, observers, W/T operators and wireless operators/air gunners.

From the first intake of 579 recruits in July 1940, almost a further 27,000 airmen were trained there before the Wing left Babbacombe. No 3 ITW also came to Torquay in June. Its headquarters were at St. James' Hotel (now Harbour Point). Hotels in Beacon Terrace were requisitioned, together with Park Hall Hotel and the Regina Hotel (which was slightly damaged during a "tip and run raid" in June 1942); the Dorchester and Devonshire Hotels were requisitioned later, from February 1943. St. Vincents' Hotel (now flats) was taken over for use by the WAAF. Some 8,000 trainees passed through before it was disbanded in February 1944.

A third ITW was No 5. which also moved to Torquay in June 1940. Headquarters were in Castle Chambers, later moving to Hotel Metropole (now the Cavendish). A full list of hotels used is not known but they included the Majestic and Stanbury Hotels which were damaged on 30 May 1943 and had to be evacuated. Some 10,000 men completed their training at No 3 ITW.

=== 1941 ===
During the early part of 1941 the first "War Weapons Week" was held, and on the first day raised £150,007 towards the £500,000 target. During this period evacuees began to flood into Torquay from Bristol and Plymouth during the Blitz air attacks on those cities. Iron railings were deemed "available for munitions" (i.e. for melting down), and their removal started early the next year. On 22 April 1941 Torquay had its first serious air raid (at the time of the Plymouth Blitz); the house of the chief warden in the Warberries was destroyed and two of his children killed. On 4 May there was another, with 31 high explosive bombs dropped in Forest Road, the Daison and at Maidencombe. Most of these early attacks were from Luftwaffe pilots jettisoning bombs left over from the raids on Plymouth, while returning to their bases in France and the Low Countries.

No 13 ITW was formed in Torquay in June 1941 to train pilots, observers and navigators principally from the Commonwealth and Allied Air Forces. The intakes were smaller and the courses longer, so only about 3,000 passed through the Wing. The Headquarters were in the Belgrave Hotel at first and later at Torre Abbey. The logbook of this Wing also records the first arrival of American troops in Torbay, where they remained until 1944 and the D-Day landings.

=== 1942 ===
In March 1942 a small vessel, intended as a blockship across Torquay Harbour, was sunk in an air-raid. In May a British Typhoon aircraft crashed-landed on Meadfoot Beach, the pilot being uninjured.

No 39 Air-Sea Rescue unit was based in Torquay Harbour (which is possibly why a blockship was kept ready). Later, in 1944, HSL No 2511 was on station at Torquay; it was a 67 ft (20 m) Thornycroft vessel, similar to the famous Whaleback designed by Hubert Scott-Payne.

On 7 June, Torquay was attacked by four aircraft, causing no casualties. An air-raid on August Bank Holiday caused considerable damage and casualties, as did an early evening raid on 4 September. A Mr Denton and Sgt. Richardson (of the Home Guard) received the George Medal for gallantry in fighting the fires following this attack.

Another major raid on Torquay took place on 25 October, during which RAF Hospital, Torquay based at the Palace Hotel was severely damaged, causing 43 casualties including 19 deaths. The east wing of the hotel was severely damaged and the building was put out of action for the rest of the war. The empty hotel was damaged again in a raid months later. The 65th anniversary of the attack was commemorated with a memorial service at the hotel on 25 October 2007.

=== 1943 ===
One of the worst tragedies to hit the local population during the year of 1943 was the "Rogation Sunday" attack which destroyed the Parish Church at St. Marychurch and resulted in the deaths of 21 children. One of the German aircraft involved in the bombing raid accidentally touched the spire of the nearby Catholic Church and crashed into houses in Teignmouth Road causing the large death toll.

Morrison and Anderson shelters were delivered in all the Torbay towns later in the year as a result of the increase in bombing raids targeting the town. Morrison indoor shelters 'would be issued free to those employed in an occupation compulsorily insured under the NHI Acts and whose earnings did not exceed £350 per annum, Others could purchase them for £7' (a year later, with D-Day over, the various Councils collected them for use in London which was suffering attacks by 'V' weapons). At the end of 1943 those evacuated from the South Hams Battle Area began arriving in the Torbay towns.

=== 1944 ===
Early in 1944, the first of thousands of US Army personnel arrived in Torquay preparing for the buildup of forces in Southern England that would ultimately result in the launch of Operation Overlord. Men of the 3204th Quartermaster Service Company were billeted mainly in Chelston and Cockington. Seven GIs were in "Cypress Heights" with Mr DeSuanne; others were at "Greenhaven" and "Combe Martin" with Mr Meadow in Vicarage Road and at small homes in Sherwell Lane, Rathmore Road, Avenue Road, Old Mill Road and Tor Park Road. Another unit was the 618th Ordnance Ammunition Company, 6th Amphibious Engineers, the men being billeted in private homes in St. Marychurch and Upton.

The 257th Ordnance MM Company, attached to the 6th Engineer Special Brigade, arrived in Torquay on 3 February 1944 "on a very warm winter day". They too went into private homes in St. Marychurch. Little is known about the 31st Chemical Corps, also billeted in Upton and which served in Normandy as part of the 6th Engineer Special Brigade.

In February 1944 the No 13 ITW Wing moved to Bridgnorth, and first the Rosetor (now the Riviera Centre), followed by the Belgrave shortly after were handed over to the US Army. Another ITW, No 21, was also hosted in the town for a brief spell during the spring and summer of 1944, numbers trained were small, only about 1,000 but it helped to raise the total number of airmen trained in Torquay to some 49,000 throughout the war.

In the build-up to D-Day, German raids on coastal areas were expected and Torquay's took place on 29 May when some 20 planes are believed to have been in Torbay laying mines. Some carried bombs and these were dropped around the Harbour, in Chelston and elsewhere. Nos 4 and 5 Park Crescent were destroyed but the worst affected property was "Bay Court Hotel" where rescuers dug for days for survivors. This was the last recorded raid during the war in Torquay, but throughout the past four years the air attacks had resulted in well over 700 'air raid alerts' being sounded in the Bay.

Early in 1944 a coast ban, from The Wash to Cornwall, had come into force and visitors were only allowed in if possessing appropriate permits: this was to ensure absolute security surrounded the preparation of Operation Overlord and the D-Day landings. Torquay played a vital role in the landings, more than 23,000 men of the American 4th Infantry Division departed from Torquay for Utah Beach during Overlord.

The visiting restrictions were lifted in early July soon after the beach-head in Normandy had been established following the D-Day landings, and the American and Commonwealth troops billeted in the town had departed for Northern France and Nazi-occupied Europe.

Soon after the lifting of restrictions, Great Western Railways announced "We expect a big rush of holidaymakers to the South West but unfortunately here are no arrangements for running extra trains". It opened the floodgates, a fortnight later a display board outside Paddington Station reported "Paddington overcrowded. Please use alternative routes".

=== 1945 ===
Although there were still signs of war damage to be repaired throughout the town, Torquay was declared 'open to visitors' when peace was declared in May having made a massive contribution to the war effort through its training of RAF personnel and its role in the preparations and ultimate success of Operation Overlord.

== Since 1945 ==
After the war tourist patterns changed considerably. Many more people could afford to travel abroad for their holidays, and car ownership became commonplace, leading to fewer visitors to British holiday resorts, mostly travelling by car, and often touring, spending a day or two in each place. Many visitors stay at inexpensive bed-and-breakfast accommodation (b&b's) instead of hotels.

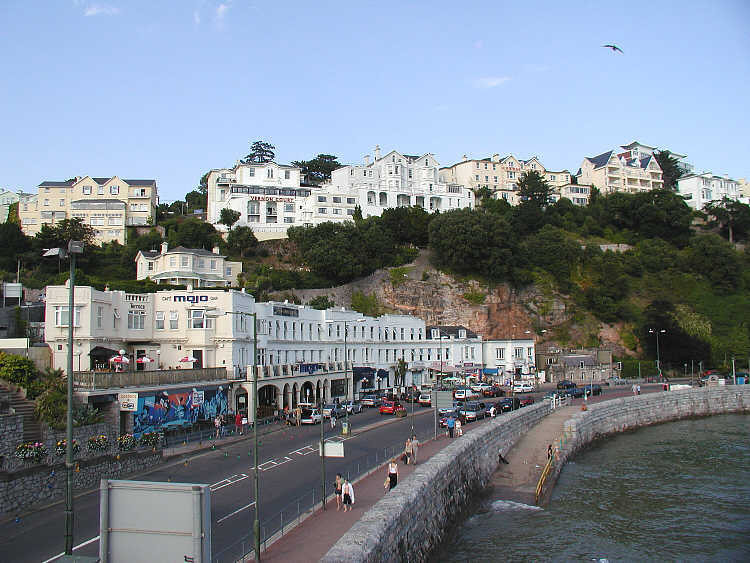
Part of the Torquay seafront at high tide

In 1948 the watersports events of the 1948 Summer Olympic Games were held in Torbay. The Olympic flame was brought from London and burned for the duration at Torre Abbey Gardens.

In 1950 the EBU, a coalition of 23 broadcasting organisations from Europe and the Mediterranean was formed in Torquay following a conference held by the BBC at the Imperial Hotel on the seafront. The EBU's most well-known production is probably the Eurovision Song Contest organised by its Eurovision Network.

In the early twenty-first century Torquay became better-known abroad, and received more foreign tourists, usually touring by car. It is also a major destination for foreign language students, who visit the town for the summer to learn English and see the sights of England.

In October 2005, Torquay as part of Torbay chose its first directly elected mayor, Nicholas Bye, under an electoral system which was later described as "a total failure", Bye receiving votes from fewer than 7% of the electorate. He beat Liberal Democrat Nicholas Pannell in the second round of counting with a total of 7,096 votes to Pannell's 5,197. After the election, Bye noted that "it is quite clear from canvassing that a lot of people did not want an elected mayor."

Since the expansion of the EU in 2004, Torquay underwent a significant demographic shift, with large numbers of Eastern European migrant workers settling in the region. Prominent amongst this wave of newcomers are workers from Poland and the Czech Republic, with estimates in 2005 suggesting as many as 5,000 Poles in the region. Some such workers return to their native country after a period of work, while others settle in Britain. Reflecting this shift in population, the local newspaper The Herald Express started publishing a weekly Polish column (Polak dla Polakow), and a Polish shop, or Polski Sklep, opened on Lucius Street.

On 28 May 2022, a superyacht named Rendezvous; an 85 ft Princess motorboat caught fire in Torquay Harbour. A major incident was declared by the police and coastguards evacuated the nearby area, including the beach and roads. The local fire brigade managed to secure the vessel at Princess Pier after it drifted away from its moorings, but it sank soon afterwards. No injuries were reported.

== Members of Parliament ==
Members for South Devon

- Lord John Russell (Whig) 1832–1835
- John Crocker Bulteel (Whig) 1832–1835
- Sir John Yarde Buller (Conservative) 1835–1858
- Montagu Edmund Parker (Conservative) 1835–1849
- Sir Ralph Lopes (Conservative) 1849–1854
- Sir Lawrence Palk (Conservative) 1854–1868
- Samuel Trehawke Kekewich (Conservative) 1858–1868

Members for East Devon

- Sir Edward Courtenay (Conservative) 1868–1870
- Sir Lawrence Palk (Conservative) 1854–1880
- Sir John Henry Kennaway (Conservative) 1870–1885
- Lt. Col William Hood Walrond (Conservative) 1880–1885

Members for Torquay

- Lewis McIver (Liberal) 1885–1886
- Richard Mallock (Conservative) 1886–1895
- Commander Arthur Phillpotts (Conservative) 1885–1900
- Sir Francis Layland-Barratt (Liberal) 1900–1910
- Colonel Charles Rosdew Burn (Unionist) 1910–1923
- Captain Piers Gilchrist Thompson (Liberal) 1923–1924
- Charles Williams (Conservative) 1924–1955
- Frederic Bennett (Conservative) 1955–1974

Members for Torbay

- Sir Frederic Bennett (Conservative) 1974–1987
- Rupert Allason (Conservative) 1987–1997
- Adrian Sanders (Liberal Democrats) 1997– 2015
- Kevin Foster (Conservative) 2015 - 2024
- Steve Darling (Liberal Democrats) 2024 -
