= Louis Durant =

American racing driver (1910–1972)

- Born: Durant Oscar Lewis; September 25, 1910 Belleville, Kansas, U.S.
- Died: February 13, 1972 (aged 61) San Bernardino, California, U.S.

Champ Car career
- 3 races run over 6 years
- Best finish: 10th (tie) (1939)
- First race: 1939 Milwaukee 100 (Milwaukee)
- Last race: 1946 Indianapolis 500 (Indianapolis)
Wins	Podiums	Poles
0	1	0

Durant Oscar Lewis (September 25, 1910 – February 13, 1972) was an American racing driver who competed under the nom de course Louis Durant.

== Racing career ==
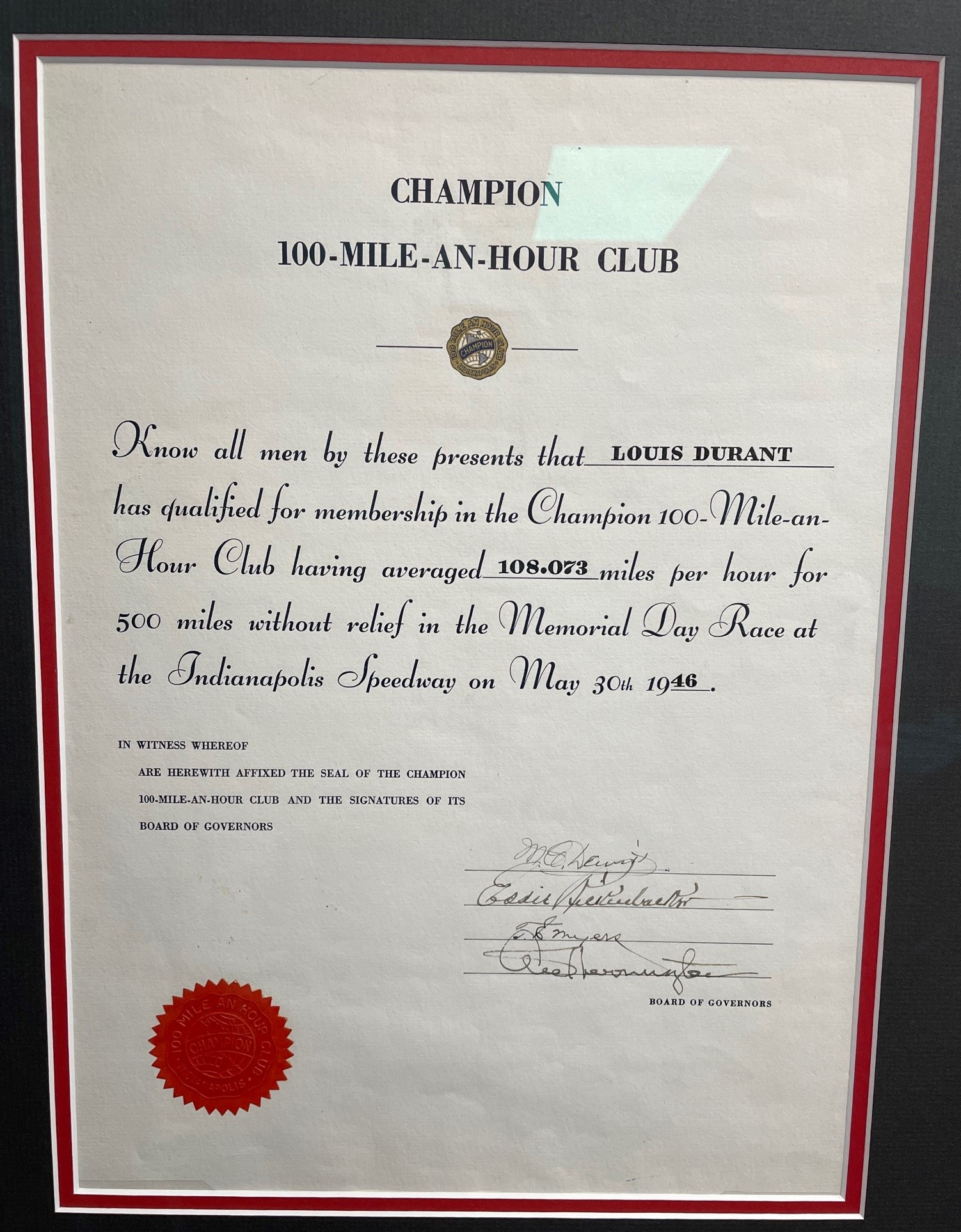
The 100 MPH Club certificate awarded to Durant is currently on display in the office of Indianapolis Motor Speedway president J. Douglas Boles

Durant was a member of one of the most exclusive clubs in the world, the 100 Mile Per Hour Club. To qualify for membership, drivers were required to complete the Indianapolis 500-mile Race without relief while averaging over 100 miles an hour. Durant drove a 1938 Alfa-Romeo 308 C Special Race Car in the Indianapolis 500 in 1946 and finished in sixth place.

== Motorsports career results ==
=== Indianapolis 500 results ===
Year	Car	Start	Qual	Rank	Finish	Laps	Led	Retired
1946	33	6	118.973	31	6	200	0	Running
Totals						200	0	

Starts	1
Poles	0
Front Row	0
Wins	0
Top 5	0
Top 10	1
Retired	0
