= John Milner (nonjuror) =

English clergyman and scholar

John Milner (1628–1702) was an English clergyman, known as a nonjuring minister, scholar and opponent of John Locke.

== Life ==
Milner was second son of John Milner and Mary, daughter of Gilbert Ramsden, born at Skircoat, in the parish of Halifax, and was baptised 10 February 1628. He was educated at the Halifax grammar school and entered at Christ's College, Cambridge, 21 June 1642. He probably left without a degree ahead of the parliamentary visitation of the university. Returning to Halifax he made the acquaintance of John Lake, whose sister he seems to have married. Milner was probably with Lake at Oldham in 1651; it has been inferred that he was schoolmaster at Chadderton appointed in August 1641. Lake's friend was preaching at Oldham as late as 1654.

Milner is said to have subsequently returned to Halifax, and at the Restoration was given the curacy of Beeston in the parish of Halifax by Lake, who had then become vicar of Leeds. In 1662 he obtained the degree of B.D. at Cambridge by royal letters. His petition for his degree states that he had been deprived of a good benefice during the rebellion. In the same year he was made minister of St. John's, Leeds, was inducted vicar of Leeds 4 August 1673, and elected prebendary of Ripon 29 March 1681.

At the Glorious Revolution of 1688 he joined the nonjurors, was deprived of all his preferments, and retired to St. John's College, Cambridge, where he lived in comparative ease. He died 16 February 1702, and was buried in the college chapel on 19 February. His only son, Thomas, vicar of Bexhill, Sussex, proved a great benefactor to Magdalene College, Cambridge, under his will dated 5 September 1721.

== Works ==
Milner published:

- 'Conjectanea in Isaiam ix. 1, item in Parallela qusedam Veteris ac Novi Testamenti in quibus Versionis LXX Interpretum . . . cum Textu Hebraeo conciliationem meditatur Author,' dedicated to James Duport and Edmund Castell, London, 1673.
- 'A Collection of the Church History of Palestine from the Birth of Christ to the Beginning of the Empire of Diocletian,' London, 1688.
- 'A Short Dissertation concerning the Four Last Kings of Judah,' London, 1687 or 1689, occasioned by Joseph Scaliger's Judicium de Thesi Chronologica.
- 'De Nethinim sive Nethinaeis et de eis qui se Corban Deo nominabant disputatiuncula adversus Eugubinum, Card. Baronium,' Cambridge, 1690.
- 'A Defence of Archbishop Usher against Dr. Cary and Dr. Isaac Vossius, . . . with an Introduction concerning the Uncertainty of Chronology,' Cambridge, 1694. Controversial work supporting James Ussher against Robert Cary and Isaac Vossius.
- 'A Discourse of Conscience,' &c., London, 1697 or 1699.
- 'A View of the Dissertation upon the Epistles of Phalaris, Themistocles, &c., lately published by the Rev. Dr. Bentley, also of the Examination of that Dissertation by the Honourable Mr. Boyle,' London, 1698.
- 'A Brief Examination of Some Passages to the Chronological Fact of a Letter written to Dr. Sherlock in his Vindication, in a letter to a friend,' with 'A Further Examination [of the above] in a second letter.'
- 'An Account of Mr. Locke's Religion out of his own Writings,' &c. (charging Locke with Socinianism), London, 1700.
- 'Animadversiones upon M. Le Clerc's Reflexions upon our Saviour and His Apostles,' Cambridge, 1702.

Two anonymous pamphlets on Bishop John Lake's 'Dying Profession,' have been assigned to Milner, or Robert Jenkin. They were published at London in 1690. Milner left in manuscript a translation in Latin of the Targum on the First and Second Book of Chronicles, and other works on Scriptural chronology and current ecclesiastical controversies. The Account of Mr. Locke's Religion includes moderate and shrewd criticisms of Locke's detailed reasoning.
