= Robert Carey =

Robert Carey may refer to:

- Robert Carey (died 1586), MP for Barnstaple
- Robert Carey, 1st Earl of Monmouth (c. 1560–1639), English nobleman and MP
- Robert Carey (British Army officer) (1821–1883), British Army officer
- Robert D. Carey (1878–1937), governor of Wyoming
- Robert T. Carey (fl. 1848), Whig member of the Wisconsin State Assembly
- Robert Carey (gangster) (1894–1932), American armed robber and contract killer

== See also ==
- Robert Cary (disambiguation)
- Bob Carey (disambiguation)
