= Cockington =

Village in Devon, England

Coordinates: 50.45630°N 3.5650°W

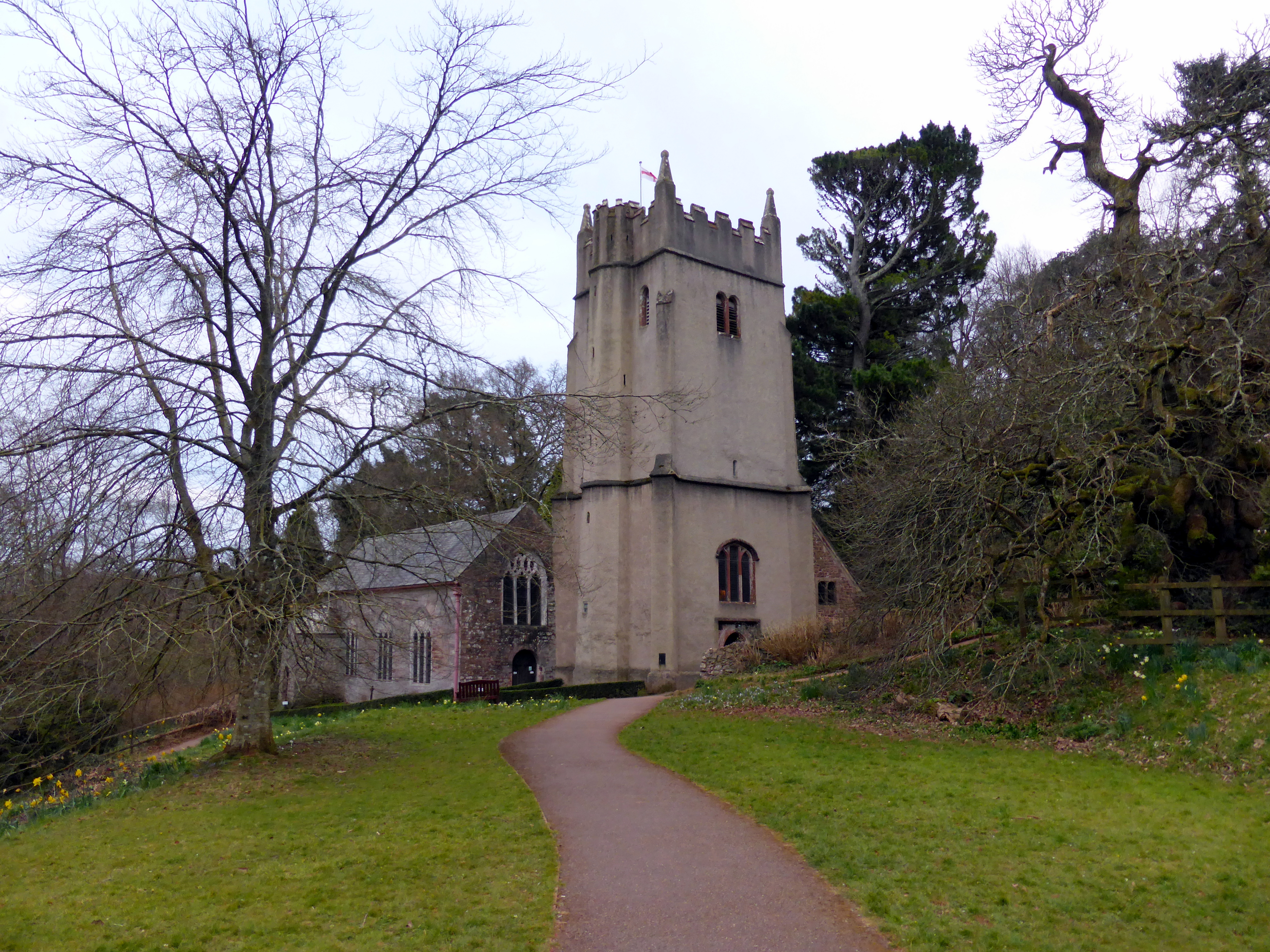

- Location within Devon
- Population: 10,636 (ward 2011)
- OS grid reference: SX8963
- Unitary authority: Torbay
- Ceremonial county: Devon
- Region: South West
- Country: England
- Sovereign state: United Kingdom
- Post town: Torquay
- Postcode district: TQ2
- Dialling code: 01803
- Police: Devon and Cornwall
- Fire: Devon and Somerset
- Ambulance: South Western
- UK Parliament: Torbay

Cockington is a village near Torquay, in the Torbay district, in the ceremonial county of Devon, England. Cockington with Chelston had a population of 8,366 in 2021. It has old cottages within its boundaries, and is about two miles from the centre of Torquay.

== History ==
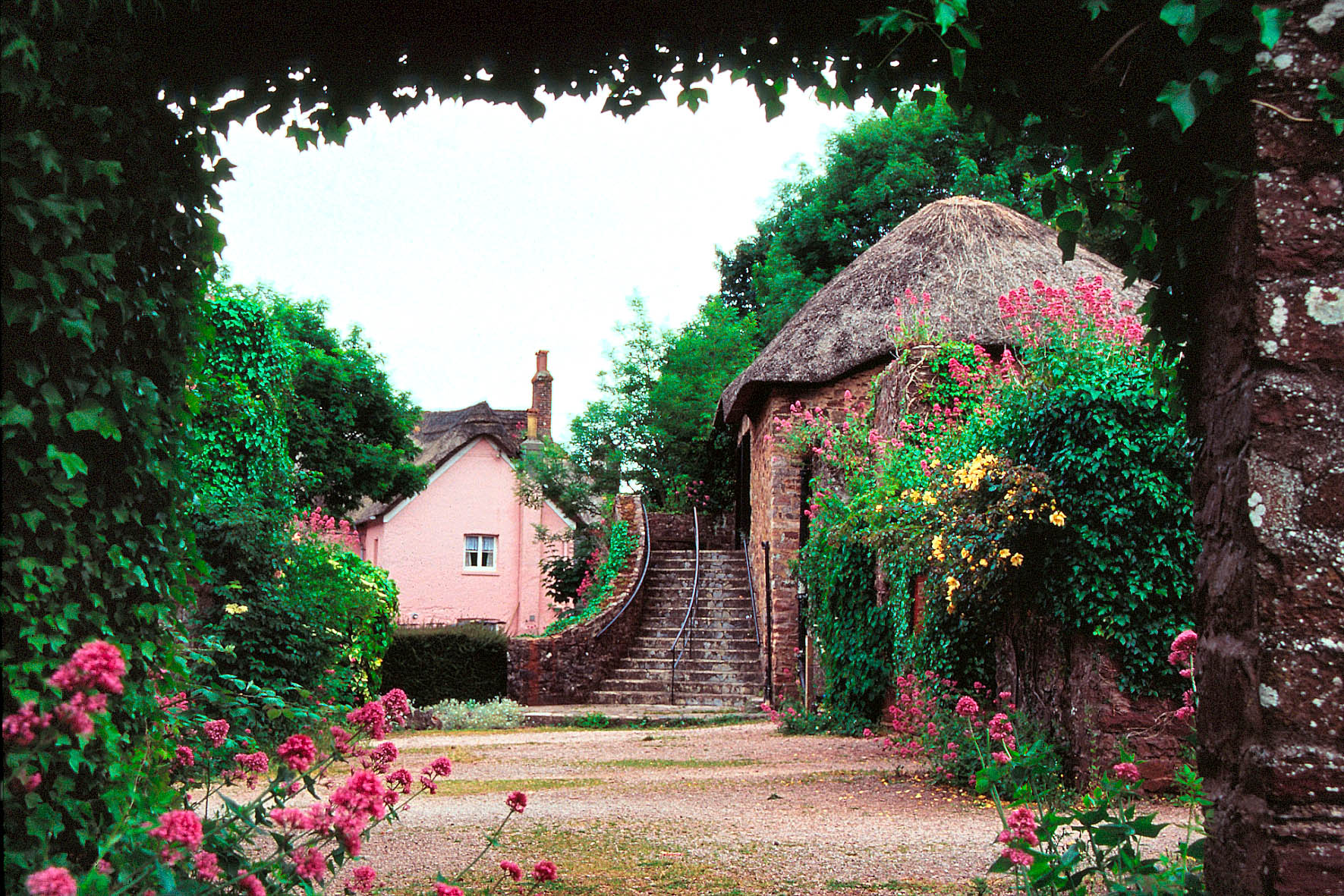
Cockington

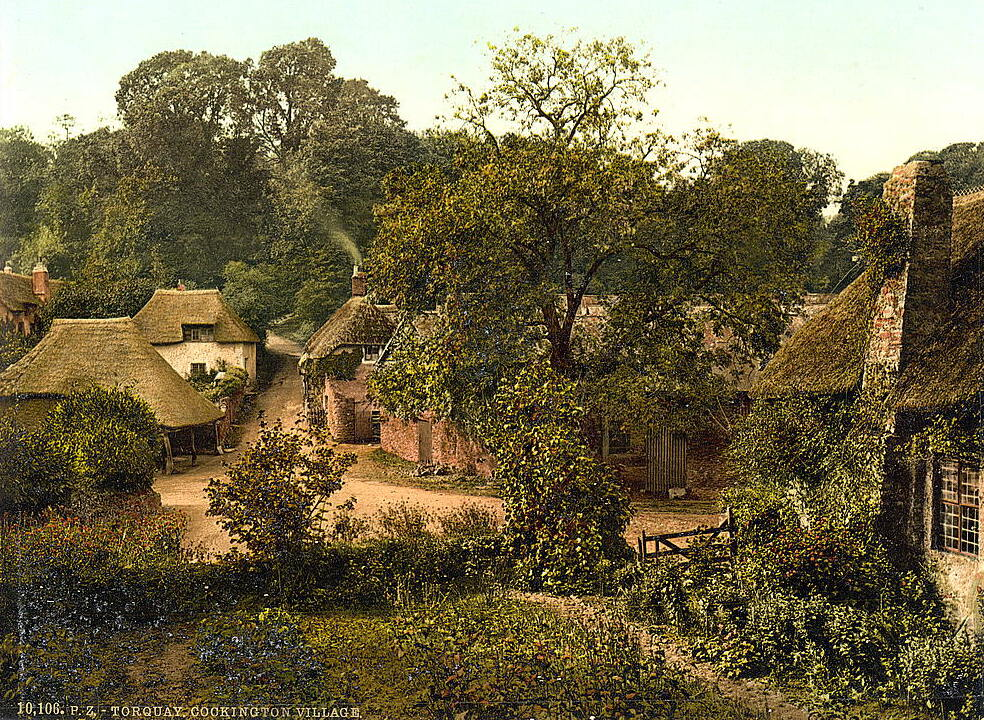
Cockington Village, ca. 1890 - 1900

The village was probably founded 2,500 years ago during the Iron Age with evidence of two hill forts on either side of Cockington Valley. Little is known about Cockington from that point up until the remains of a small Saxon village were found near the Drum Inn. The evidence from this village shows that it was primarily a fishing and farming village. The first official documentation of the village was in the 10th century. The manor was owned by Alric the Saxon, before William Hostiarus, William de Falaise and Robert FitzMartin, who passed it down to his son Roger, who renounced his name to become Roger de Cockington. The Cockington family owned Cockington Estate from 1048–1348. The Cary family (this particular branch included George Carey (c. 1541–1616)) owned the court from 1375 to 1654. It was then sold to the Mallock family a family of rich silversmiths from Exeter, who owned it from 1654 to 1932 when they sold the estate to the Torquay Corporation.

In 1921 the parish had a population of 279. On 1 October 1928 the parish was abolished and merged with Torquay.

== Buildings ==
There are several buildings of note in Cockington.

=== Cricket Pavilion and grounds ===
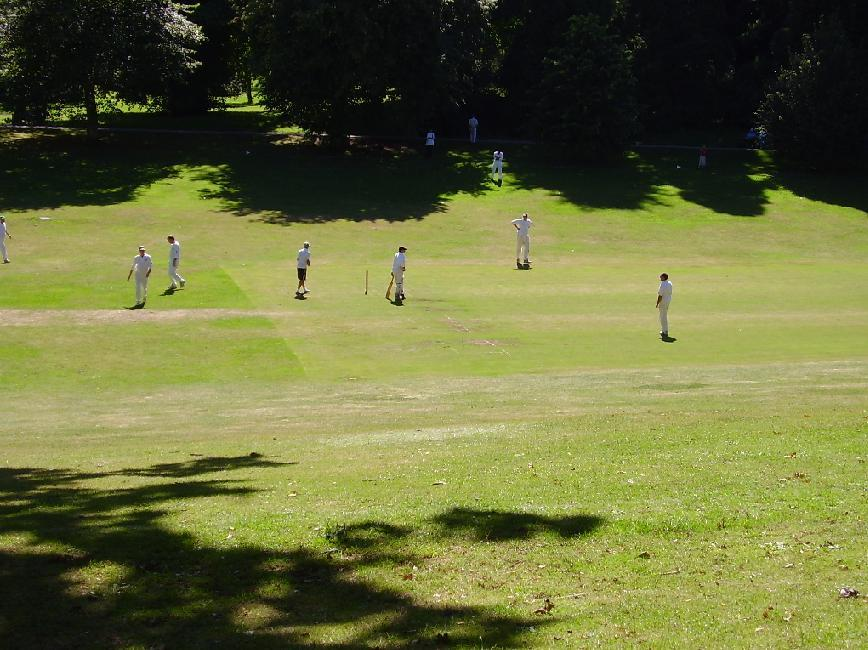
The cricket field during a match at full swing

The park which is now home to the cricket grounds was originally a medieval deer park. Cricket started to be played on it in 1947. The current cricket pavilion was built after the original burnt down in the 1990s.

=== Drum Inn ===
The Grade II listed thatched Drum Inn is the local public house and restaurant in Cockington. Designed by Sir Edwin Lutyens, it opened in 1936 and cost £7,000 to build. Covering 522 square metres, it uses 16th century styled bricks, made in Belgium to Lutyens specifications. The two largest chimney stacks are evocative of the shape of another Lutyens creation, The Cenotaph in London. The Drum Inn occupies the site of a former sawmill and was the flagship project of Cockington Trust Ltd, who were proposing to build a new village. It was the only building they were able to complete before the village was sold in 1946. Originally intended to be called "The Forge Inn", the name was changed as the Cockington Trust thought it might be "Predudicial to the celebrated forge in the village".

The pub sign depicting an Elizabethan soldier beating a drum, is attributed to be from the studio of Dame Laura Knight. The original was painted on a solid sheet of copper and today it hangs on a wall inside the pub, with a facsimile in its place outside. Sir Alan Charles Laurence Whistler, the noted poet and glass engraver presented Sir Edwin Lutyens with a poem titled "The Drum", engraved on a glass pane that was originally placed in a lounge window. It is now framed and is on display inside the pub.

=== Cockington Forge ===
Cockington Forge is a Grade II listed former smithy at the village crossroads. Historic England describes the standing building as probably late eighteenth or early nineteenth century in date, built of local stone rubble with some cob, thatched, with the roof carried forward to shelter an open working bay on three posts, and a small lean-to outshut at the rear.

Local writers have treated the site as ancient, although firm documentary evidence for a medieval structure is lacking. In 1930 Arthur Ellis wrote that “of the old Forge… which dates probably from the 14th century, nothing is known”, and noted that in 1615 Anthony Hopping was a “striker” or apprentice to the Cockington smith, later marrying his master’s daughter, Grace Davey. Joan F. Lang recorded in 1971 that the forge was reputed to date to the fourteenth century, but quoted a Devon Notes and Queries item of 1910 that spoke of a thatched farriers’ forge “dating from 1552”, adding that the accuracy of the statement could not be verified.

Parish and estate references list payments to blacksmiths in the eighteenth century, and named smiths are traceable from the nineteenth century. William Davy is recorded between about 1851 and 1896, followed by Thomas Stevens until 1913; Mr Hopgood worked between 1910 and 1915. In the early 1930s the smith was Ernest Bickford, and during the Second World War there was work for two smiths, Bill Bradford and Harry Sweeney. From 1947 the resident blacksmith was Bill Brooking, who gave demonstrations for visitors alongside the retail trade. The manufacture and sale of miniature horseshoes was introduced by David Behar, Chairman of Cockington Trust Ltd., in the early 1930's.

In 1949 Julius (Jack) Segelman acquired the lease of the forge and adjoining cottages, and the business traded as Cockington Forge & Gift Shops Ltd. A related company, Cockington Forge & Village Industries Ltd, was placed into members’ voluntary liquidation in 1952, as recorded in The London Gazette. In 1969 the limited company was purchased by the Emdon family, who managed the forge alongside 3 other retail gift shops in the village centre, into the mid-1990s when the forge was sold to a farrier. (The Emdon family continued trading from Court Cottage (aka The Old School House) until August, 2001). During the Emdon period the Forge, with the blacksmithing tools moth-balled, operated primarily as a gift and brass shop, with occasional smithing demonstrations rather than a full-time resident smith. By the time the farrier sold the forge in 2001 all the blacksmithing equipment had been comprehensively removed. The current owners run it as a gift shop.

The forge has attracted regular press attention and has been widely photographed. In 1929 and 1930 a rumour that an American planned to buy the forge and re-erect it overseas prompted a public rebuttal from A. R. Powys of the Society for the Protection of Ancient Buildings, who stated that the forge had never been offered for sale.

=== The Almshouses ===
The Almshouses consist of seven terraced cottages built during the reign of King James I of England by the Cary family to house the poor and those who could not work within the village. When the Mallock family took over the Cockington estate, the almshouses fell into disrepair. They were rebuilt between 1790 and 1810.

=== Cockington Court ===
Cockington Court was the mansion house of the Mallock family, and remains the focal point of the estate. It was originally built in the 16th century, but few architectural features remain from that time. It has been altered and extended several times, most notably in 1673 by Rawlyn Mallock and about 1820 by the Reverend Roger Mallock, who had the top floor removed and the interior remodelled.

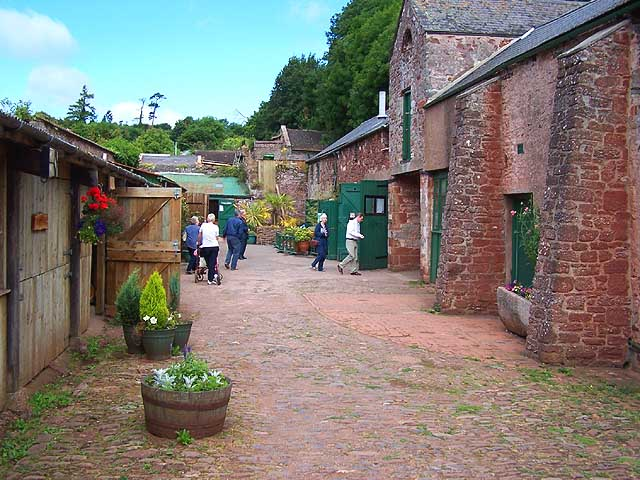
Cockington Court Craft Centre

Cockington Court was built over the remains of a medieval court. A far cry from the days of the Cary family when it was an actual court, it is now filled with various arts and crafts workshops.

In her youth, Agatha Christie regularly visited Cockington. Her novel Why Didn't They Ask Evans? is dedicated to Christopher Mallock. The Mallock family were friends of Christie's from the years before her first marriage. The Mallocks staged amateur theatricals at Cockington Court, in which Christie, managing to overcome her usual crippling shyness, took part.

=== Other notable buildings ===
- Cockington Church which has been estimated to have been standing since 1069 built by William de Falaise.
- A water mill that is in the middle of the village;

== Notable residents ==
- Robert Cary a chronologer was born in Cockington in about 1615.
- Robert Sweet (1782-1835) an author and horticulturalist, was also born in the village.
- Patrick, a four-year-old therapy pony, was informally elected mayor in July 2022 following a publicity campaign by a local charity. He worked with recovery groups in hospitals and mental health wards and community projects some of which involved him visiting the Drum Inn, as mentioned above. About two weeks after his appointment as honorary mayor, local health officials from the governing authority, the Torbay Council in responding to a complaint issued a restraining order preventing the pony entering the inn.

== See also ==
- History of Torquay
- Chelston
- Cockington Green Gardens – park in Australia named after Cockington, Devon
