= Darlington Record Club =

The Darlington Raceway's unconventional "egg" shape

The Unocal-Darlington Record Club was a club in the NASCAR Grand National and Winston Cup Series from 1959 to about 2001, based at Darlington Raceway. Membership was achieved by setting qualifying records during time trials for the annual Southern 500 held on Labor Day weekend. During its heyday, it was considered one of the most prestigious and exclusive clubs in motorsports.

The club was sponsored by longtime NASCAR sponsor Pure Oil, which in 1965 was acquired by Union Oil, and later Tosco Corporation (1997), Phillips Petroleum (2001), and after a merger, ConocoPhillips. At some time after the 2001 season, the club was quietly retired, as NASCAR made rule changes that effectively eliminated its usefulness. The club ended permanently when ConocoPhillips ended its sponsorship and was replaced by Sunoco, and the Ferko lawsuit resulted in the lineal Southern 500 being removed from the schedule until the lineal changes of 2020, with the lineal Southern 500 returning to its fall date in 2021.

The original eight charter members were selected in 1959: Dick Joslin (Dodge), Marvin Panch (Ford), Joe Caspolich (Oldsmobile), Bob Burdick (Thunderbird), Speedy Thompson (Chevrolet), Richard Petty (Plymouth), Elmo Langley (Buick), and Fireball Roberts (Pontiac). Roberts was selected as the first president; Former Darlington Raceway president Bob Colvin contributed in creating the club.

== Membership qualifications ==
Drivers were awarded membership in the club based on official time trials for the Southern 500. The fastest single driver of each car make (e.g. Chevrolet, Ford, etc.) each won the membership. The general requirements for eligibility were as follows:

- Car making the qualifying attempt must be a current model year car.
- At least three cars from each car make must be entered for that make to have an automatic berth in the club for that year.
- The fastest single driver from each of the various car makes qualified for the club, provided their speed was within 2% of the fastest overall car in the field.

Special provisions were made for other cars:

- If only one car from a particular make is entered, that driver was only eligible if he set a track record for that car make; and was within 2% of the fastest overall car in the field (i.e., the pole position winner for the race)
- If the car was not a current model year chassis, that driver was only eligible if he was the overall fastest driver for that make (i.e., faster than all the current model year chassis of that same make); and he was within 2% of the fastest overall car in the field.

By 2000, the "within 2%" rule was tightened to "within 1%."

Drivers who qualified for the club attended a special dinner and reception and received a special blue blazer. Drivers who entered the club by setting an overall Darlington track record, however, received the more prestigious white blazer. A ring, a plaque and a cash award were also presented. Entry into the club was a lifetime membership, but only active members participated in actual duties. The reception dinner was held on the Friday of Labor Day weekend (two days prior to the Southern 500), and would recognize the drivers who qualified based on the previous year's event.

Only records set in the September Southern 500 were recognized for the club. Any records set during the spring race, or support races (added in 1983 to the Southern 500 weekend) were not eligible.

=== Competition Board ===
Once the membership was established, the active members of the club were eligible for the annual Competition Board. All active members who qualified for the race within 2% of the fastest car in the field (later 1%) were placed on the board. The board's primary responsibilities were to assist NASCAR in training rookies for racing at each race during the season.

Once the Competition Board was established, the board members voted amongst themselves to select the Club President and Club Vice-President. Each had a tenure of one year. The president's duties primarily were to lead the rookie training, and conduct the annual Darlington Raceway rookie orientation meeting and further rookie test that they had to pass (similar to the Indianapolis 500) before attempting to qualify at Darlington for either race. Likewise, they were not allowed to qualify on the first day of time trials, and were relegated to the second round only (starting 21st or lower).

In 1977, Darlington Raceway began adding support races that helped inexperienced drivers gain experience in shorter events with less-powerful cars. The Baby Grand National series ran 150 kilometer (94.5 mile) races for four-cylinder cars, which ran until 1984. In 1982, the second national series (now the NASCAR O'Reilly Auto Parts Series) added a 200 mile race for the Rebel 500 weekend, and in 1983 another second national series race was run on Southern 500 weekend as a 250-mile race (owing to Blue Laws in South Carolina, the race was set to the state's 250-mile minimum for Sunday races). From 1984 to 2004, support races for the second national series were added to both weekends. Since these drivers had gained experience at Darlington through support races (up to 294 laps of experience in two lower races each year), the rookie panel and NASCAR decided in 1993 to abolish both the rookie test and the first-round rookie prohibition, as Cup Series rookies had typically made four or more starts through support races, if they had at least two full seasons of support series events. When the rule was abolished in 1993, the three primary rookies had each made at least four Darlington starts through the two second national series races each of the previous two seasons. Since 2005, the second national series has run one race (two from 2020-2024) and the current tertiary Craftsman Truck Series also a single race at Darlington, annually since 2020 (two in 2021), allowing drivers to gain even more experience. As of the 2025 NASCAR Cup Series schedule, the Xfinity Series races on the spring weekend and the Truck Series runs on the Southern 500 weekend.

== Record Club by car make ==
Chevrolet
Year	Driver	Speed (mph)
1959	Speedy Thompson	123.387
1960	Rex White	125.698
1961	Dave Mader	125.578
1962	Rex White	127.462
1963	Junior Johnson	133.414
1964	J. T. Putney	126.840
1965	Jim Paschal	134.739
1966	Bobby Johns	135.989
1967	Bobby Johns	138.577
1968	Bobby Allison	138.389
1969	Bobby Johns	142.008
1971	Charlie Glotzbach	147.519
1972	Bobby Allison	152.228
1973	Bobby Allison	149.434
1974	Benny Parsons	147.312
1975	Benny Parsons	151.632
1976	Darrell Waltrip	152.862
1977	Darrell Waltrip	153.493
1979	Donnie Allison	154.506
1981	Ricky Rudd	151.889
1983	Neil Bonnett	157.187
1985	Benny Parsons	155.857
1986	Tim Richmond	158.489
1987	Terry Labonte	156.313
1988	Dale Earnhardt	160.198
1989	Ken Schrader	160.021
1990	Dale Earnhardt	158.448
1991	Dale Earnhardt	161.317
1992	Ernie Irvan	161.992
1993	Ken Schrader	161.259
1994	Ken Schrader	166.828
1995	Dale Earnhardt	166.501
1996	Jeff Gordon	170.833
1997	Ken Schrader	169.801
1998	Jeff Gordon	168.261
1999	Jeff Gordon	170.792
2000	Mike Skinner	169.211
2001	Jeff Gordon	167.916

Ford Thunderbird see note
Year	Driver	Speed (mph)
1959	Bob Burdick	122.714
1960	Elmo Langley	122.244
Ford
Year	Driver	Speed (mph)
1959	Marvin Panch	118.201
1960	Joe Weatherly	124.881
1961	Fred Lorenzen	128.437
1962	Fred Lorenzen	127.898
1963	Fireball Roberts	133.819
1964	Fred Lorenzen	135.727
1965	Junior Johnson	137.528
1967	Darel Dieringer	143.426
1968	Lee Roy Yarbrough	144.054
1969	Donnie Allison	151.177
1971	Walter Ballard	142.114
1975	Buddy Baker	152.663
1976	Buddy Baker	152.991
1979	Bobby Allison	154.881
1982	Bill Elliott	153.891
1983	Buddy Baker	155.188
1984	Ricky Rudd	154.099
1985	Bill Elliott	156.641
1986	Cale Yarborough	156.119
1987	Davey Allison	157.232
1988	Bill Elliott	160.827
1989	Alan Kulwicki	160.156
1990	Bill Elliott	157.777
1991	Davey Allison	162.506
1992	Sterling Marlin	162.249
1993	Bobby Labonte	160.303
1994	Geoff Bodine	166.998
1995	John Andretti	167.379
1996	Dale Jarrett	170.934
1997	Bill Elliott	170.513
1998	Dale Jarrett	168.879
1999	Kenny Irwin	170.970
2000	Jeremy Mayfield	169.444
2001	Kurt Busch	168.048

Pontiac
Year	Driver	Speed (mph)
1959	Fireball Roberts	123.734
1960	Cotton Owens	126.146
1961	Fireball Roberts	128.680
1962	Fireball Roberts	130.246
1963	Bobby Johns	132.565
1964	Bunkie Blackburn	129.589
1965	Bobby Johns	133.585
1966	H. B. Bailey	134.310
1967	H. B. Bailey	136.410
1968	H. B. Bailey	133.901
1969	Roy Tyner	136.952
1971	David Pearson	147.569
1975	H. B. Bailey	139.107
1981	Harry Gant	152.693
1982	Ricky Rudd	153.368
1983	Tim Richmond	155.729
1984	Tim Richmond	154.598
1985	Tim Richmond	154.948
1988	Rusty Wallace	159.761
1989	Rusty Wallace	159.668
1990	Rusty Wallace	157.504
1992	Rusty Wallace	159.849
1993	Rusty Wallace	158.935
1994	Bobby Labonte	166.433
1995	Ward Burton	165.665
1996	Rick Mast	169.713
1997	Bobby Labonte	170.661
1998	Ward Burton	168.677
1999	Ward Burton	170.845
2000	Johnny Benson	169.409
2001	Ken Schrader	167.254

Dodge
Year	Driver	Speed (mph)
1959	Dick Joslin	112.910
1960	Jim Whitman	117.710
1961	T. C. Hunt	121.988
1962	Larry Thomas	123.773
1963	David Pearson	131.204
1964	David Pearson	135.979
1966	Lee Roy Yarbrough	140.058
1967	Buddy Baker	142.733
1968	Charlie Glotzbach	144.830
1969	Bobby Allison	151.482
1971	Buddy Baker	145.909
1972	Richard Petty	149.072
1973	Richard Petty	147.848
1974	Richard Petty	150.132
1975	Richard Petty	152.839
1976	Dave Marcis	152.839
1978	Earle Canavan	147.247
2001	John Andretti	167.493

Plymouth
Year	Driver	Speed (mph)
1959	Richard Petty	123.124
1960	Richard Petty	125.074
1961	Richard Petty	125.906
1962	Richard Petty	127.143
1963	G. C. Spencer	131.074
1964	Richard Petty	136.815
1965	Curtis Turner	134.474
1966	Richard Petty	139.719
1967	Richard Petty	143.436
1968	Darel Dieringer	144.443
1969	Dick Brooks	146.367
1970	Dick Brooks	147.640
1971	Pete Hamilton	147.662

Matador
Year	Driver	Speed (mph)
1972	Dave Marcis	147.746
1974	Bobby Allison	148.842
1975	Bobby Allison	152.663

Oldsmobile
Year	Driver	Speed (mph)
1959	Joe Caspolich	121.808
1960	Tiny Lund	118.840
1978	Cale Yarborough	152.182
1979	Cale Yarborough	152.358
1985	Buddy Baker	154.108
1986	Buddy Baker	156.666
1987	Lake Speed	156.268
1988	Lake Speed	158.046
1989	Harry Gant	159.300
1990	Harry Gant	157.217
1991	Harry Gant	160.843
1992	Harry Gant	160.811

Chrysler
Year	Driver	Speed (mph)
1961	Buck Baker	126.339
1962	Buddy Baker	126.372
1963	Neil Castles	119.033
1978	Ed Negre	146.322

Mercury
Year	Driver	Speed (mph)
1961	Curtis Crider	119.854
1962	Emanuel Zervakis	126.227
1963	Joe Weatherly	132.770
1964	Darel Dieringer	134.419
1965	Earl Balmer	136.551
1966	Darel Dieringer	139.593
1967	Lee Roy Yarbrough	140.625
1968	Cale Yarborough	144.830
1969	Cale Yarborough	151.985
1972	David Pearson	152.342
1975	David Pearson	153.901
1976	David Pearson	154.669

Buick
Year	Driver	Speed (mph)
1959	Elmo Langley	123.387
1982	David Pearson	155.739
1983	Joe Ruttman	155.022
1984	Bobby Allison	154.452
1985	Greg Sacks	154.773
1986	Bobby Hillin Jr.	156.397
1988	Morgan Shepherd	158.198
1989	Ricky Rudd	158.607
1990	Brett Bodine	157.434

Note that in 1959 & 1960, the Ford Thunderbird was categorized separately from Ford.

== Alphabetical member list ==
Bold indicates track record member (white blazer)

- **Bobby Allison**
- **Davey Allison**
- Donnie Allison
- **John Andretti**
- H. B. Bailey
- Buck Baker
- Buddy Baker
- Walter Ballard
- Earl Balmer
- Johnny Benson
- Bunkie Blackburn
- Dick Brooks
- Brett Bodine
- **Geoff Bodine**
- **Neil Bonnett**
- Bob Burdick
- Ward Burton
- Earle Canavan
- Joe Caspolich
- Neil Castles
- Curtis Crider
- Darel Dieringer
- Dale Earnhardt
- **Bill Elliott**
- Harry Gant
- **Charlie Glotzbach**
- Jeff Gordon
- Pete Hamilton
- Bobby Hillin Jr.
- T. C. Hunt
- Ernie Irvan
- **Kenny Irwin Jr.***
- **Dale Jarrett**
- Bobby Johns
- **Junior Johnson**
- Dick Joslin
- Alan Kulwicki
- Bobby Labonte
- Terry Labonte
- Elmo Langley
- Fred Lorenzen
- Tiny Lund
- Dave Mader
- Dave Marcis
- Sterling Marlin
- Rick Mast
- Jeremy Mayfield
- Ed Negre
- **Cotton Owens**
- Marvin Panch
- Benny Parsons
- Jim Paschal
- **David Pearson**
- **Richard Petty**
- J.T. Putney
- **Tim Richmond**
- **Fireball Roberts**
- Ricky Rudd
- Joe Ruttman
- Greg Sacks
- Ken Schrader
- Morgan Shepherd
- Mike Skinner
- Lake Speed
- G.C. Spencer
- Larry Thomas
- Speedy Thompson
- Curtis Turner
- Roy Tyner
- Rusty Wallace
- **Darrell Waltrip**
- Joe Weatherly
- Rex White
- Jim Whitman
- **Cale Yarborough**
- **LeeRoy Yarbrough**
- Emanuel Zervakis

*Posthumous induction. Irwin won pole and set the track record in 1999 during Pepsi Southern 500 qualifying, but was killed at during Cup practice at the Loudon July race ten months later.

One of the award plaques presented to Bobby Allison was featured on the television program American Pickers. It was acquired for display at the NASCAR Hall of Fame.

== Club presidents ==
Tenure runs for 12 months, from September to September of each year.

- 1960–61 Fireball Roberts
- 1961–62
- 1962–63 Buck Baker
- 1963–64
- 1964–65
- 1965–66
- 1966–67
- 1967–68
- 1968–69
- 1969–70 Bobby Allison
- 1970–71
- 1971–72
- 1972–73
- 1973–74
- 1974–75
- 1975–76
- 1976–77 Dave Marcis
- 1977–78
- 1978–79
- 1979–80 Donnie Allison
- 1980–81 Ricky Rudd
- 1981–82
- 1982–83
- 1983–84 Bill Elliott
- 1984–85 Ricky Rudd
- 1985–86
- 1986–87
- 1987–88 Bobby Hillin Jr.
- 1988–89 Darrell Waltrip
- 1989–90
- 1990–91
- 1991–92
- 1992–93
- 1993–94
- 1994–95 Bobby Labonte
- 1996–97 John Andretti
- 1997–98
- 1998–99
- 1999–00 Ricky Rudd
- 2000–01
- 2001–02
- Ken Schrader
- Jeff Gordon

== See also ==
- Unocal 76 Challenge
- Unocal 76 World Pit Crew Competition

== Sources ==
- The Official NASCAR Preview and Press Guide, 1994 & 2001 edition
- Rookies get scoop on each track from veteran Rudd, August 31, 2000
- Brooks, Allison, Tyner To Be Inducted Into Record Club
