= Howden Court Hotel =

Hotel in Torbay, Devon, UK

Coordinates: 50.4662°N 3.5351°W

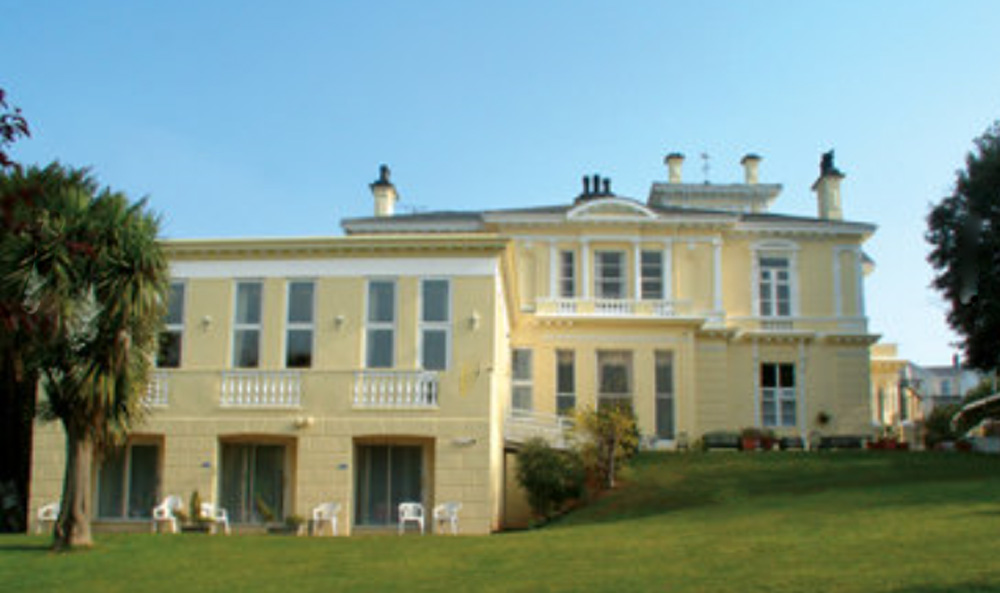
Howden Court Hotel

Howden Court Hotel in Torquay, Devon, is listed on the English Heritage Register as Grade II. It was built in about 1860. Today it is a hotel.
