= Robert Cary (priest) =

English churchman and chronologist

Robert Cary (1615?–1688) was an English churchman, for a short while archdeacon of Exeter, known as a chronologist.

== Life ==
Born at Cockington or Berry Pomeroy, Devon, he was the second son of George Cary of Cockington, and Elizabeth, daughter of Sir Edward Seymour. He was admitted a commoner of Exeter College, Oxford on 4 October 1631. He became a scholar of Corpus Christi College, Oxford in October 1634, and graduated B.A. 1635, M.A. 1638–9. He was probably fellow of his college. His kinsman, William Seymour, Marquess of Hertford, who was chancellor of the university, obtained for him the degree of D.C.L. in November 1644; and later promoted him to the rectory of Portlemouth, near Kingsbridge.

Cary became intimate with the local presbyterians and was made moderator of his division of the county. On the Restoration, however, he was one of the first to congratulate the king, and was installed archdeacon of Exeter on 18 August 1662.

He gave up his preferment, feeling threatened by 'some great men then in power' in 1664, and retired to his rectory, where he lived quietly till his death, on 19 September 1688.

== Works ==
His major work was Palaeologia Chronica; a chronological account of ancient time, in three parts, (1) Didactical; (2) Apodeictical; (3) Canonical, (1677), an attempt to settle ancient chronology. John Milner of Cambridge, published, in 1694, a Defence of Archbishop Ussher against Dr. Robert Cary and M. Is. Vossius. Cary also translated some hymns from the church services into Latin verse, and printed them on folio sheets.
