= Bob Carey (racing driver) =

American racing driver (1904–1933)

- Born: Robert Elwood Carey; September 24, 1904 Anderson, Indiana, U.S.
- Died: April 16, 1933 (aged 28) Los Angeles, California, U.S.

Championship titles
- AAA Championship Car (1932)

Champ Car career
- 6 races run over 1 year
- Best finish: 1st (1932)
- First race: 1932 Indianapolis 500 (Indianapolis)
- Last race: 1932 Oakland 150 (Oakland)
- First win: 1932 Detroit 100 (Detroit)
- Last win: 1932 Syracuse 100 (Syracuse)
Wins	Podiums	Poles
2	3	1

Robert Elwood Carey (September 24, 1904 – April 16, 1933) was an American racing driver. He was the AAA National Champion in 1932.

== Racing career ==
Carey's first national championship race was the 1932 Indianapolis 500. Having taken the lead after Billy Arnold had crashed out, Carey endured a blown right rear tire (causing him to spin three times without hitting the wall or another car), and later a damaged shock absorber; in total, he lost over twelve minutes to the leader and later winner, Fred Frame, but managed to erase four minutes of the interval and finished fourth.

Carey went on to win rain-shortened races at the dirt tracks in Detroit and Syracuse, and clinched the 1932 national title by finishing second in the season finale at Oakland Speedway with points leader Frame dropping out. No other rookie driver would win the national championship until reigning Formula One world champion Nigel Mansell in 1993.

== Death ==
Carey was fatally injured in an accident at Legion Ascot Speedway prior to the 1933 season. He crashed in practice after appearing to have a hung throttle.

== Awards and honors ==
Carey has been inducted into the following halls of fame:

- National Sprint Car Hall of Fame (2005)

== Motorsports career results ==
=== Indianapolis 500 results ===
Year	Car	Start	Qual	Rank	Finish	Laps	Led	Retired
1932	61	14	111.070	22	4	200	36	Running
Totals						200	36	

Starts	1
Poles	0
Front Row	0
Wins	0
Top 5	1
Top 10	1
Retired	0
