= 1928 AAA Championship Car season =

Auto racing season

- AAA National Championship Trail

Season
- Races: 7
- Start date: May 30
- End date: October 12

Awards
- National champion: (United States) Louis Meyer
- Indianapolis 500 winner: (United States) Louis Meyer

The 1928 AAA Championship Car season consisted of seven races, beginning in Speedway, Indiana on May 30 and concluding in Salem, New Hampshire on October 12. There were also three non-championship races. The AAA National Champion and Indianapolis 500 winner was Louis Meyer.

Fred Comer died during the season's final event at Rockingham.

== Schedule and results ==
All races running on Dirt/Brick/Board Oval.

Rnd	Date	Race name	Track	Location	Type	Pole position	Winning driver
1	May 30	(United States) International 500 Mile Sweepstakes	Indianapolis Motor Speedway	Speedway, Indiana	Brick	(United States) Leon Duray	(United States) Louis Meyer
2	June 10	(United States) Detroit Race 1 - 100	Michigan State Fairgrounds	Detroit, Michigan	Dirt	(United States) Ray Keech	(United States) Ray Keech
3	July 4	(United States) Rockingham Preliminary - 15	Rockingham Park	Salem, New Hampshire	Board	(United States) Leon Duray	(United States) Leon Duray
4	July 4	(United States) Rockingham Race - 185	Rockingham Park	Salem, New Hampshire	Board	(United States) Leon Duray	(United States) Ray Keech
NC	July 4	(United States) Atlantic City Race 1 - 100	Atlantic City Speedway	Hammonton, New Jersey	Board	—	(United States) Freddie Winnai
NC	July 15	(United States) Detroit Race 2 - 100	Michigan State Fairgrounds	Detroit, Michigan	Dirt	—	(United States) Howard Taylor
5	August 19	(United States) Altoona Race - 200	Altoona Speedway	Tyrone, Pennsylvania	Board	(United States) Leon Duray	(United States) Louis Meyer
6	September 1	(United States) Syracuse Race - 100	New York State Fairgrounds	Syracuse, New York	Dirt	(United States) Cliff Woodbury	(United States) Ray Keech
NC	September 16	(United States) Atlantic City Race 2 - 100	Atlantic City Speedway	Hammonton, New Jersey	Board	—	(United States) Ray Keech
7	October 12	(United States) International Motor Classic - 200^{A}	Rockingham Park	Salem, New Hampshire	Board	(United States) Bob McDonogh	(United States) Cliff Woodbury

Non-championship race

^A Scheduled for 200 miles, stopped due to track breaking up after 50 laps.

== Final points standings ==
Note: Drivers had to be running at the finish to score points. Points scored by drivers sharing a ride were split according to percentage of race driven. Starters were not allowed to score points as relief drivers, if a race starter finished the race in another car, in a points scoring position, those points were awarded to the driver who had started the car.
The final standings based on reference.

Pos	Driver	INDY (United States)	DET (United States)	SAL1 (United States)	SAL2 (United States)	ALT (United States)	SYR (United States)	SAL3 (United States)	Pts
1	(United States) Louis Meyer	1	DNQ	7	2	1	10	16	1596
2	(United States) Ray Keech	4	**1***	8	1	6	1	14	915
3	(United States) Lou Moore RY	2	3	11	11	13		12	406
4	(United States) George Souders	3	14	DNQ					270
5	(United States) Bob McDonogh	16		2	6	2		**11**	248
6	(United States) Fred Frame	8	2						146
7	(United States) Norman Batten	5	12	9	3	16	8	8	145
8	(United States) Cliff Woodbury	23	6	5	10	11	**7**	1	138
9	(United States) Billy Arnold R	7	7			4		3	120
10	(United States) Bill Spence R	7	4	12	4	DNQ			115
11	(United States) Russ Snowberger	29				DNQ	2		110
12	(United States) Dave Evans	12		13	5	5	5	10	97
13	(United States) Fred Comer	9		3	9	3		15	95
14	(United States) Zeke Meyer	5					4	DNQ	89
15	(United States) Babe Stapp	6	DNQ	14	13	7	12	4	87
16	(United States) Ralph Hepburn	24*		4	DNS	15	DNQ	2	70
17	(United States) Chet Gardner R		10				3	DNQ	60
18	(United States) Leon Duray	**19***	11	**1**	**7**	**8**	13	7	49
19	(United States) Earl Devore	18		10	8	9		5	22
20	(United States) Tony Gulotta	10							21
21	(United States) Howard Taylor R		5						20
22	(United States) Bob Robinson R						6		15
23	(United States) Cliff Bergere	28		6	12	14	DNQ	6	10
24	(United States) Dutch Baumann	10							9
-	(United States) Louis Schneider	11	8						0
-	(United States) Deacon Litz R	14	13			10		9	0
-	(United States) Wilbur Shaw	25	9						0
-	(United States) Charles Ganung R						9		0
-	(United States) Louis Wilson	11							0
-	(United States) Frank Farmer						11		0
-	(United States) Johnny Seymour R	17				12			0
-	(United States) Jimmy Gleason	15	DNQ	DNQ		DNQ	DNQ	13	0
-	(United States) Shorty Cantlon R	13	DNQ						0
-	(United States) Henry Kohlert	13							0
-	(United States) W. E. Shattuc	13							0
-	(United States) Wesley Crawford	14							0
-	(United States) Ralph DePalma						14		0
-	(United States) Cliff Durant	16							0
-	(United States) Cy Marshall R	18							0
-	(United States) Sam Ross R	20	DNQ						0
-	(United States) Ira Hall R	21							0
-	(United States) Jack Petticord	21							0
-	(United States) Pete Kreis	22							0
-	(United States) Benny Shoaff	26							0
-	(United States) Clarence Belt R	27							0
-	(United States) Buddy Marr	DNQ	DNQ						0
-	(United States) L. L. Corum	DNQ							0
-	(United States) Peter DePaolo	DNQ							0
-	(United States) Jim Hill	DNQ							0
-	(United States) Chet Miller	DNQ							0
-	(United States) Kelly Petillo	DNQ							0
-	(United States) Herman Schurch	DNQ							0
-	(United States) Eddie Hearne					DNQ			0
-	(United States) Bill Albertson						DNQ		0
-	(United States) Bo Amos						DNQ		0
-	(United States) Claude Berton						DNQ		0
-	(United States) Frank Conley						DNQ		0
-	(United States) Rick Decker						DNQ		0
-	(United States) Louis Hornbrook						DNQ		0
-	(United States) G. Hunn						DNQ		0
-	(United States) George Huss						DNQ		0
-	(United States) Henry Korgis						DNQ		0
-	(United States) Aguila Lenyard						DNQ		0
-	(United States) Ralph Malamud						DNQ		0
-	(United States) Hap Ray						DNQ		0
-	(United States) Charles Schwab						DNQ		0
-	(United States) Ira Vail						DNQ		0
-	(United States) George Wingerter						DNQ		0
-	(United States) Freddie Winnai						DNQ		0
-	(United States) George Zimmerman						DNQ		0
-	(Romania) Ionel Ghica-Cantacuzino	DNP							0
-	(United States) Phil Shafer	DNP							0
Pos	Driver	INDY (United States)	DET (United States)	SAL1 (United States)	SAL2 (United States)	ALT (United States)	SYR (United States)	SAL3 (United States)	Pts

Color	Result
Gold	Winner
Silver	2nd place
Bronze	3rd place
Green	4th & 5th place
Light Blue	6th-10th place
Dark Blue	Finished (Outside Top 10)
Purple	Did not finish (Ret)
Red	Did not qualify (DNQ)
Brown	Withdrawn (Wth)
Black	Disqualified (DSQ)
White	Did not start (DNS)
Blank	Did not participate (DNP)
Blank	Not competing

**In-line notation**
**Bold**	Pole position
Italics	Ran fastest race lap
*	Led most race laps
Rookie of the Year
Rookie

== See also ==
- 1928 Indianapolis 500
