= 1927 AAA Championship Car season =

Auto racing season

- AAA National Championship Trail

Season
- Races: 11
- Start date: March 6
- End date: October 12

Awards
- National champion: (United States) Peter DePaolo
- Indianapolis 500 winner: (United States) George Souders

The 1927 AAA Championship Car season consisted of 11 races, beginning in Culver City, California on March 6 and concluding in Salem, New Hampshire on October 12. There were also three non-championship races. The AAA National Champion was Peter DePaolo and the Indianapolis 500 winner was George Souders.

== Schedule and results ==
All races running on Dirt/Brick/Board Oval.

Rnd	Date	Race name	Track	Location	Type	Pole position	Winning driver
1	March 6	(United States) Culver City Race - 250	Culver City Speedway	Culver City, California	Board	(United States) Frank Lockhart	(United States) Leon Duray
2	May 7	(United States) Atlantic City Race - 200	Atlantic City Speedway	Hammonton, New Jersey	Board	(United States) Frank Lockhart	(United States) Dave Lewis
3	May 30	(United States) International 500 Mile Sweepstakes	Indianapolis Motor Speedway	Speedway, Indiana	Brick	(United States) Frank Lockhart	(United States) George Souders
NC	June 5	(United States) Detroit Race - 100	Michigan State Fairgrounds	Detroit, Michigan	Dirt	—	(United States) Frank Lockhart
4	June 11	(United States) Altoona Race 1 - 200	Altoona Speedway	Tyrone, Pennsylvania	Board	(United States) Leon Duray	(United States) Peter DePaolo
5	July 4	(United States) Rockingham Race - 200	Rockingham Park	Salem, New Hampshire	Board	(United States) Cliff Woodbury	(United States) Peter DePaolo
NC	September 3	(United States) Syracuse Race - 100	New York State Fairgrounds	Syracuse, New York	Dirt	(United States) Frank Lockhart	(United States) Frank Lockhart
6	September 5	(United States) Altoona Race 2 - 200	Altoona Speedway	Tyrone, Pennsylvania	Board	(United States) Cliff Woodbury	(United States) Frank Lockhart
7	September 19	(United States) Charlotte Heat - 25	Charlotte Speedway	Pineville, North Carolina	Board	(United States) Frank Lockhart	(United States) Frank Lockhart
8	September 19	(United States) Charlotte Semi - 50	Charlotte Speedway	Pineville, North Carolina	Board	—	(United States) Peter DePaolo
9	September 19	(United States) Charlotte Main - 100	Charlotte Speedway	Pineville, North Carolina	Board	(United States) Harry Hartz	(United States) Babe Stapp
NC	September 25	(United States) Cleveland Race - 100	Randall Park Raceway	North Randall, Ohio	Dirt	—	(United States) Frank Lockhart
10	October 12	(United States) Rockingham Race 1 - 65	Rockingham Park	Salem, New Hampshire	Board	(United States) Frank Lockhart	(United States) Frank Lockhart
11	October 12	(United States) Rockingham Race 2 - 75^{B}	Rockingham Park	Salem, New Hampshire	Board	(United States) Frank Lockhart	(United States) Frank Lockhart

Non-championship race
- Indianapolis 500 was AAA-sanctioned and counted towards the 1927 AIACR World Manufacturers' Championship title.

^A Scheduled for 200 miles, stopped due to fire on track.
^B Extra race added after wreckage cleared and damaged track sections repaired.

== Final points standings ==
Note: Drivers had to be running at the finish to score points. Points scored by drivers sharing a ride were split according to percentage of race driven. Starters were not allowed to score points as relief drivers, if a race starter finished the race in another car, in a points scoring position, those points were awarded to the driver who had started the car.
The final standings based on reference.

Pos	Driver	CUL (United States)	ATL (United States)	INDY (United States)	ALT1 (United States)	SAL1 (United States)	ALT2 (United States)	CHA1 (United States)	CHA2 (United States)	CHA3 (United States)	SAL2 (United States)	SAL3 (United States)	Pts
1	(United States) Peter DePaolo	3	12	26	1	1*	2	2	1	4	2	3	1440
2	(United States) Frank Lockhart	**4**	**13**	**18***	12	2	1	**1**	10	10	**1**	**1**	1040
3	(United States) George Souders RY			1	DNQ	Wth							1000
4	(United States) Leon Duray	1	11	27	**7**	11	5	7	2	5	8	DNS	630
5	(United States) Harry Hartz	2	3	25	2	7	13	6		13	13		595
6	(United States) Earl Devore	7	6	2	15	12	6	8	5	6	4	9	518
7	(United States) Babe Stapp R			31	5	5	3	4	4	1	7	2	508
8	(United States) Tony Gulotta		16	3	3	15	4	5	9	12	6	4	470
9	(United States) Dave Lewis	12	1	33	11	DNQ							400
10	(United States) Cliff Woodbury	14	5	19	6	**4**	**10**	3	3	2	3	5	330
11	(United States) Dave Evans	13*	4	5	9	3	7	10	7	3	12		323
12	(United States) Al Melcher	9	2	15	8	6	8		6	7	5	7	298
13	(United States) Eddie Hearne	6	8	7	4	10				11			126
14	(United States) Zeke Meyer			2	DNQ								122
15	(United States) Wilbur Shaw R			4									102
16	(United States) Harlan Fengler	5											50
17	(United States) Louis Meyer			4		14							38
18	(United States) Bob McDonogh			6	10	13	11						34
19	(United States) Frank Elliott	11	15	10	13						11	6	33
20	(United States) Cliff Bergere R	DNQ		9									29
21	(United States) Tommy Milton			8									16
22	(United States) W. E. Shattuc	17	7	22	DNQ		12		11	9	15		15
23	(United States) Norman Batten	8	10	30		DNP							15
24	(United States) Steve Nemesh			5									12
25	(United States) Fred Comer		9	DNQ		8							10
26	(United States) Ira Vail			7									6
27	(United States) Wesley Crawford			9									6
28	(United States) Russ Snowberger R						14	9	8	8	9	8	5
29	(United States) Cornelius Van Ranst			8									5
30	(United States) George Abell R	10		11									5
-	(United States) Fred Lecklider	18		23		9	9						0
-	(United States) Pete Kreis			17	16	16					10	10	0
-	(United States) Bennett Hill	16		28	10	DNQ							0
-	(United States) Fred Frame R	DNQ		11									0
-	(Romania) George Fernic R			11									0
-	(United States) Jim Hill			12									0
-	(United States) Don Ostrander R			12									0
-	(United States) Benny Shoaff R			13		DNQ							0
-	(United States) Ralph Hepburn	15		24	14	DNQ							0
-	(United States) Earl Cooper			DNQ		17					14		0
-	(United States) Wade Morton			14	DNQ								0
-	(United States) Ray Keech R		14										0
-	(United States) Ralph Holmes R			14									0
-	(United States) Freddie Winnai R			14									0
-	(United States) L. L. Corum			16									0
-	(United States) Louis Schneider R			16									0
-	(United States) Dutch Baumann R			20									0
-	(United States) Eddie Burbach R			21									0
-	(United States) Al Cotey			21									0
-	(United States) Henry Kohlert R			23									0
-	(United States) Jules Ellingboe			29									0
-	(United States) Jack Petticord R			32									0
-	(United States) Buddy Marr			DNQ	DNQ								0
-	(United States) Leslie Allen			DNQ									0
-	(United States) Dan Cain			DNQ									0
-	(United States) Ben Jones			DNQ									0
-	(United States) Bruce Miller			DNQ									0
-	(United States) Sam Ross			DNQ									0
-	(United States) Steve Smith			DNQ									0
-	(United States) Sam Swank			DNQ									0
-	(United States) Clarence Belt						DNQ						0
-	(United States) Deacon Litz						DNQ						0
-	(United States) Ralph DePalma			Wth									0
-	(United States) Cliff Durant			Wth									0
-	(United States) William White		DNP										0
Pos	Driver	CUL (United States)	ATL (United States)	INDY (United States)	ALT1 (United States)	SAL1 (United States)	ALT2 (United States)	CHA1 (United States)	CHA2 (United States)	CHA3 (United States)	SAL2 (United States)	SAL3 (United States)	Pts

Color	Result
Gold	Winner
Silver	2nd place
Bronze	3rd place
Green	4th & 5th place
Light Blue	6th-10th place
Dark Blue	Finished (Outside Top 10)
Purple	Did not finish (Ret)
Red	Did not qualify (DNQ)
Brown	Withdrawn (Wth)
Black	Disqualified (DSQ)
White	Did not start (DNS)
Blank	Did not participate (DNP)
Blank	Not competing

**In-line notation**
**Bold**	Pole position
Italics	Ran fastest race lap
*	Led most race laps
Rookie of the Year
Rookie

== See also ==
- 1927 Indianapolis 500
