= 1928 Indianapolis 500 =

American motor race

16th Indianapolis 500
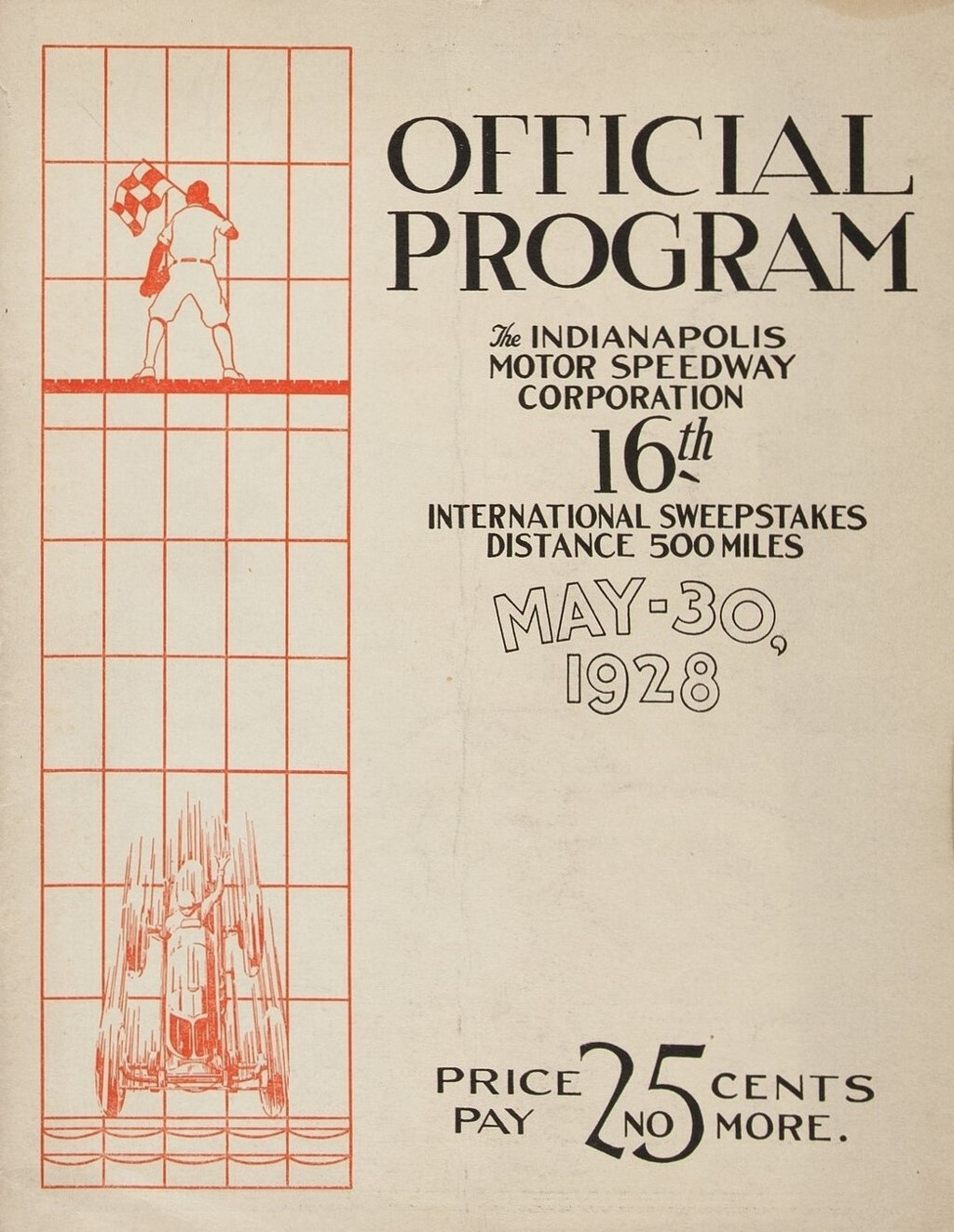

Indianapolis Motor Speedway

Indianapolis 500
- Sanctioning body: AAA
- Date: May 30, 1928
- Winner: Louis Meyer
- Winning Entrant: Alden Sampson II
- Winning Chief Mechanic: Ted Plaisted
- Winning time: 5:01:33.75
- Average speed: 99.482 mph (160.101 km/h)
- Pole position: Leon Duray
- Pole speed: 122.391 mph (196.969 km/h)
- Most laps led: Leon Duray (59)

Pre-race
- Pace car: Marmon 8 (Model 78)
- Pace car driver: Joe Dawson
- Starter: Chester Maitland
- Honorary referee: Lawrence P. Fisher
- Estimated attendance: 140,000

Chronology
Previous	Next
1927	1929

The 16th International 500-Mile Sweepstakes Race was held at the Indianapolis Motor Speedway on Wednesday, May 30, 1928. This was the first Indianapolis 500 presided over by new Speedway president Eddie Rickenbacker. Rain threatened to wash out the day, but the showers stopped and the race started on time. One brief shower slowed the race around the 400-mile mark, bringing out the yellow flag for a few laps.

It was the third year contested with the supercharged 91 1/2 cu. in. (1.5 L) displacement engine formula. A total of seven supercharged front-wheel drive cars were entered, and they swept the front row during time trials. Leon Duray in a Miller took the pole position with an average speed of 122.391 mph (196.969 km/h), a new track record. Duray dominated much of the first half of the race, setting a blistering pace. He dropped out in the second half, however, due to an overheating engine.

With twenty laps to go, Tony Gulotta led Jimmy Gleason and Louis Meyer. All three cars were running nose-to-tail. On lap 181, Gulotta slowed with a leaking fuel tank and a clogged fuel line. Gleason and Meyer then battled for the lead. On lap 196 Gleason headed for the pits to take on water for the radiator. A crew member missed the radiator and accidentally doused the car's magneto with water. The engine was ruined with a cracked water jacket in sight of victory.

Rookie driver Louis Meyer (though he had appeared as a relief driver in 1927) took the first of what would be three career Indy victories. Meyer did not even land his ride until one week before the race. Car owner Phil Shafer entered a rear-wheel drive Miller Special for Wilbur Shaw with initial backing from a fuel pump manufacturer. The deal fell through, and Shafer abruptly sold the car to Alden Sampson II four days before time trials were scheduled to begin. Sampson hired Louis Meyer to drive the car, the same machine that Tony Gulotta drove to a third place in 1927. Meyer put the car safely in the field in 13th starting position. He drove a steady, consistent pace, and led only once, the final 19 laps of the race. Despite predictions of record speed, and an early blistering pace, Meyer's average speed of 99.482 mph for the 500 miles fell short of the record set in 1926.

== Race schedule ==
The race was scheduled for Wednesday May 30. Competitors began arriving at the grounds in mid-April, and the track was to be made available for practice and testing no later than May 1. Elimination trials were scheduled for three days (May 26–28), but qualifying extended to an additional day (and for a brief period on race morning) due to a short field. The annual awards banquet was scheduled for Thursday evening (May 31) at the Indianapolis Chamber of Commerce.

Race schedule – May 1928
Sun	Mon	Tue	Wed	Thu	Fri	Sat
		1	2	3	4	5
6	7	8	9	10	11	12
13	14	15	16	17	18	19
20	21	22	23	24	25	26; Time Trials
27; Time Trials	28; Time Trials	29; Time Trials	30; Indy 500	31; Banquet		

Color	Notes
Green	Track available for practice
Dark blue	Time trials
Silver	Race day
Blank	No track activity

== Preparations and Practice ==
=== April ===
- Friday April 13: Earl Cooper was entered in a Marmon 68 Special.
- Monday April 16: Frank Lockhart, the 1926 race winner, left Indianapolis for Daytona Beach. Lockhart was preparing to make another attempt at the Land speed record. He was injured in a crash on his previous attempt on February 22. Just days later on April 25, however, while making a pass down Daytona's beach straightaway, the car cut a tire, and crashed violently. Lockhart was thrown from the machine, and killed instantly.
- Friday April 27: Two Duesenberg machines were entered, by A.S. Kirkeby and Harry Maley. The track had been closed all week while crews repaired a dip at the south end. Although no laps had been turned, the garage area was bustling with activity. Among the drivers that had arrived on the grounds were Peter DePaolo, Tommy Milton, Norman Batten, Leon Duray, defending winner George Souders, and numerous others. It was expected that many cars would begin practicing within a week.
- Monday April 30: A Bugatti was entered by William Horn for driver Shorty Cantlon.

=== May ===
- Tuesday May 1: The deadline for entries to be received was midnight on May 1. Entries postmarked on or before May 1 would also be honored. As of Tuesday morning, a total of 32 cars had been entered, with between five and ten additional entries expected.
- Wednesday May 2: Last-minute submittals brought the total thus far to 36 cars on the entry list. Earl Cooper added a third Marmon entry one minute before the deadline. his driver would be named at a later date.
- Friday May 4: Activity began to slowly pick up on Friday, as many teams and drivers were now on the grounds. Participants were at the track about a week earlier than previous years, Tom Beall's popular diner was open, and some drivers were exercising by playing sports in the infield or riding bicycles. At least two cars had taken to the track. Leon Duray took laps, as did Pete Kreis in one Earl Cooper's Marmon entries. Meanwhile, Ray Keech arrived at the Speedway searching for a ride, and defending race winner George Souders gave a lecture to engineering students at Purdue University.
- Saturday May 5: Drivers Tony Gulotta and Ray Keech were named to the two cars that belonged to Frank Lockhart.
- Sunday May 6: Ray Keech departed for Philadelphia, but was expected to return mid-week to begin practicing.
- Tuesday May 8: The race purse was announced to be $100,000 with the lap prize fund at $20,000. A total of three-fourths of the lap prizes had been pledged.
- Wednesday May 9: Popular veteran and 1915 race winner Ralph DePalma expressed interest in securing a ride for the race.
- Thursday May 10: Leon Duray was out on the track Thursday turning hot laps. Seen in the garage area prepping their machines were the Bill White team (George Souders), as well as Peter DePaolo and his mechanic Cotton Henning.
- Friday May 11: Among the participants preparing their cars in the garage area was Norman Batten, joined by his brother, Lieutenant Gene Batten, a distinguished pilot. Shorty Cantlon was also on the grounds.
- Saturday May 12: Some drivers including George Souders and Wilbur Shaw departed for a race in Akron.
- Sunday May 13: By the start of third week of practice, a total of 16 cars were housed in the garage area. Another 14 cars were being prepared at nearby locations off site. Of the 33 machines listed on the entry list, 30 had been accounted for. Cars on the track included Louis Schneider (112 mph) and Ira Hall (101 mph). Off the track, fans and participants mourned the death of driver Dave Lewis.
- Monday May 14: Cliff Bergere completed a practice lap at 119.52 mph. Also out on the track were George Souders and Fred Frame.
- Tuesday May 15: The Boyle Valve cars of Cliff Woodbury, Fred Comer, and Dave Evans were expected to arrive in the garage area Tuesday. Woodbury and Comer were slated to drive front-wheel drive machines, while Evans was driving a rear-wheel drive. Halfway through the month of May, the favorites for the race started to include Peter DePaolo, Leon Duray, Pete Kreis, Cliff Woodbury, and Babe Stapp.
- Wednesday May 16: Wilbur Shaw, still without a car to drive, continued to peruse the garage area looking for a ride. Arriving at the track was Odis A. Porter, chief timing official, who was to begin setting up the timing equipment.
- Thursday May 17: Leon Duray set an unofficial one lap track record during a practice run on Thursday. Hand-timed stopwatches clocked Duray with a lap of 1:14.40 (120.95 mph). The lap was slightly quicker than Frank Lockhart's official track record (1:14.43) during time trials in 1927). Other drivers out on the track Thursday afternoon were Peter DePaolo and Cliff Durant. The car of Ray Keech, being prepared by mechanic Jean Marcenac, was expected to take to the bricks when Keech arrived on Sunday.
- Saturday May 19: With just one week before time trials was scheduled to being, several drivers landed rides including Wilbur Shaw, Jimmy Gleason. Zeke Meyer was still looking for a ride, and Ralph Hepburn's car finally arrived at the track.
- Sunday May 20: Louis Schneider, driving with a 122 cid engine cut down to 91.5 cid, drove laps in the range of 109-112 mph. Lacking top speed down the long straights, Schneider was going through the turns faster to keep up his average speed, and it was reportedly very hard on his tires. Earl Devore was out on the track, but did not run any "hot" laps.
- Monday May 21: Ray Keech took his first laps of the month on Monday morning in the Simplex Piston Ring Special. Keech ran seven hot laps in the range of 100-105 mph. Drivers such as Wilbur Shaw and Louis Schneider announced they would attempt to qualify on the first day of elimination trials (Saturday). Of note, driver Dutch Baumann had still not been seen on the track.
- Tuesday May 22: Peter DePaolo ran a practice lap at 114 mph. Ray Keech, in his second day at the track, injured his ankle in a ball game, and would be sidelined for a few days. Approaching time trials, the favorites for the front row included Leon Duray (wh had turned the fastest practice lap of the month), Cliff Bergere, and Peter DePaolo. Two days after landing a ride, Wilbur Shaw was ousted from owner Phil Shafer's rear-wheel drive car and replaced by Louis Meyer. The car was sold Tuesday to Alden Sampson II. Shafer retained driver Babe Stapp in his front-wheel drive machine.
- Wednesday May 23: Leon Duray tested Ralph Hepburn's new car, turning some fast laps until a tire failure forced him to quit. After failing to arrive thus far, driver Prince Ghica and the Cozette Special withdrew, announcing they would not arrive.
- Thursday May 24: With only two days before elimination trials were set to begin, there was a potential that less than a full field of 33 cars would make the starting grid. Kelly Petillo crashed his Eglin Piston Pin Special in turn one. Petillo was uninjured, but the car was too damaged to repair. Also experiencing trouble was Herman Schurch in the Sievers Special, which threw a rod. Of the original 36 entries, the cars of Prince Ghica and Shorty Cantlon were no shows, and with two cars already out, only 32 cars were left. A check around the garage area indicated that at least 23 cars were planning to qualify on Saturday, led by Leon Duray, Cliff Bergere, and Peter DePaolo. Ray Keech broke an exhaust pipe on Thursday, and the crew would have to make quick repairs in order that he would be able to qualify on Saturday.
- Friday May 25: On the eve of time trials, 28 drivers announced they were prepared to make their attempts to qualify. Ray Keech and his mechanic Jean Marcenac worked all day Friday to repair their car's broken exhaust.

== Time trials ==
Qualifications was scheduled for three days, May 26–28. The minimum speed to qualify was set at 90 mph. A total of 36 entries were expected to make attempts to fill the 33 starting positions. Qualified cars on the first day of trials would line up in the grid first, followed by the second day qualifiers, and so on.

Riding mechanics were optional, however, no teams entered utilized them.

=== Saturday May 26 ===
The first day of elimination trials was held Saturday May 26. Qualifying was scheduled from 1 p.m. to 5 p.m. Any cars in line at 5 o'clock were permitted to make their runs, continuing until the track closed at sundown. The morning dawned dark, with the threat of rain looming, but fair skies prevailed. The existing track records going into the month were both held by Frank Lockhart. The one-lap track record (120.918 mph) and four-lap track record (120.100 mph) were both set during time trials in 1927.

The supercharged front-wheel drive Millers were expected to excel in qualifying, with Leon Duray the favorite for the pole position. Duray had set an unofficial track record on May 17, and was among the fastest cars all month long.

The first driver to challenge the track record was Cliff Woodbury in one of the Boyle Valve Specials owned by Mike Boyle. On his third lap, Woodbury's set a one-lap track record (121.081 mph). His four-lap average of 120.418 mph was also a record. It was noted that this was Woodbury's first attempt in a front-wheel drive car at the Speedway, and it garnered him a solid front row starting position. Woodbury's spot on the pole was short-lived, however. Leon Duray in the Miller Special took to the track a short time after Woodbury. Duray smashed the one-lap track record on his second lap with a speed of 123.203 mph. His four-lap average of 122.391 mph was also a new track record, and he secured the pole position.

The most serious incident of the afternoon involved 1925 winner Peter DePaolo. During his qualifying attempt, going into turn three on the first lap, the car went out of control, and flipped over at least three times. DePaolo was thrown from the vehicle, then the car slid upside down along the bricks, ripping off the engine cowling, shearing off the carburetor, and grinding the top of the supercharger casing. The car suffered a bent rear axle, a dented nose, and other minor damage. It was determined that the crash was caused by the steering mechanism locking up. DePaolo suffered gouges to his arms, bruised legs, and cuts on his chin. Though DePaolo escaped serious injuries, he was sidelined for the remainder of the month. After the crash, the team led by chief mechanic Collon Henning Peters began repairing the car, in hopes of still qualifying with another driver.

At the end of the day, the front wheel drive machines swept the front row, and five of the top eight starting positions. A total of 19 cars had qualified, leaving 14 positions open.

Pos	No.	Name	Lap 1 (mph)	Lap 2 (mph)	Lap 3 (mph)	Lap 4 (mph)	Average Speed (mph)	Notes
1	4	(United States) Leon Duray	122.917	123.203	121.819	121.638	122.391	New 1-lap and 4-lap track record
2	10	(United States) Cliff Woodbury	120.240	120.417	121.081	119.936	120.418	
3	21	(United States) Cliff Bergere	119.760	120.498	119.744	119.824	119.956	
4	8	(United States) Tony Gulotta	117.218	117.080	117.447	116.324	117.031	
5	7	(United States) Babe Stapp	117.371	117.894	116.913	115.399	116.887	
6	16	(United States) Ralph Hepburn	116.474	116.264	116.655	116.054	116.354	
7	24	(United States) Louis Schneider	114.767	114.068	113.866	113.450	114.036	
8	28	(United States) Lou Moore R	113.350	113.722	114.126	114.111	113.826	
9	25	(United States) Fred Comer	114.942	114.198	112.810	112.839	113.690	
10	15	(United States) Ray Keech R	112.486	114.198	112.796	114.227	113.421	
11	33	(United States) Johnny Seymour R	111.982	111.565	111.829	111.317	111.671	
12	3	(United States) George Souders W	110.987	111.815	111.996	110.987	111.444	
13	14	(United States) Louis Meyer R	109.369	112.010	111.857	112.219	111.352	
14	35	(United States) Buddy Marr R	109.422	111.083	109.609	108.656	109.685	Withdrawn May 29
15	27	(United States) Fred Frame	107.296	106.875	107.462	108.381	107.501	
16	22	(United States) Norman Batten	106.408	107.694	106.572	106.939	106.585	
17	38	(United States) Sam Ross R	108.212	107.913	105.609	104.638	106.572	
18	23	(United States) Deacon Litz R	106.559	106.395	105.349	106.559	106.213	
19	5	(United States) Cliff Durant	100.122	100.200	101.045	97.539	99.990	
—	1	(United States) Peter DePaolo					Incomplete	Wrecked in turn 3
—	34	(United States) Russ Snowberger					Incomplete	Failed hose connection

- Source: The Indianapolis News

=== Sunday May 27 ===
The second day of elimination trials was held on Sunday May 27. Five cars completed runs in front of a crowd estimated at 12,000–15,000 spectators. Pete Kreis was the fastest driver of the day. The field filled to 24 cars, leaving nine spots open.

Back in the garage area, the wrecked car of Peter DePaolo was being repaired. Bob McDonogh and Wilbur Shaw were being rumored as possible replacement drivers to the seat.

During the day, a tire changing contest was held between several of the pit crews. Dick Doyle and Bud Miller, servicing the car of George Souders, won the $50 top prize.

Pos	No.	Name	Lap 1 (mph)	Lap 2 (mph)	Lap 3 (mph)	Lap 4 (mph)	Average speed (mph)	Notes
20	32	(United States) Pete Kreis	113.165	112.191	112.814	113.464	112.906	
21	43	(United States) Billy Arnold R	111.968	110.974	111.718	113.065	111.926	
22	39	(United States) Jimmy Gleason R	112.725	111.331	110.993	111.857	111.708	
23	34	(United States) Russ Snowberger R	112.556	112.250	111.043	110.186	111.618	
24	12	(United States) Dave Evans	109.289	108.434	107.360	107.991	108.264	

- Source: The Indianapolis News

=== Monday May 28 ===
The third day of elimination trials was scheduled for Monday May 28. Although Monday was originally the final day allowed to qualify, officials announced that Tuesday afternoon and Wednesday morning may opened up due to prospects of a short field.

Clarence Belt made history, becoming the first driver ever to qualify a V-type engine at Indianapolis.

Pos	No.	Name	Lap 1 (mph)	Lap 2 (mph)	Lap 3 (mph)	Lap 4 (mph)	Average Speed (mph)	Notes
25	6	(United States) Earl Devore	109.078	109.998	110.619	109.556	109.810	
26	18	(United States) Dutch Baumann	106.132	105.423	106.724	106.635	106.226	Withdrew May 30
27	17	(United States) L. L. Corum	97.603	96.681	96.899	93.604	96.172	Withdrew May 30
28	41	(United States) Clarence Belt R	95.704	96.133	96.442	95.826	96.026	

- Source: The Indianapolis Star

=== Tuesday May 29 ===
Despite a slippery track, three drivers completed qualifying attempts. Officials decided that the deadline to qualify would be set at 12 noon. Late in the afternoon Ted Miller, the relief driver for Buddy Marr, was taking practice laps in the #35 B.W. Cooke Special. Miller crashed at the south end of the track. Miller suffered a broken arm and lacerations, and was taken to the hospital. The car was badly damaged. The crew would work into the night to try to repair the car, but ran out of time, and withdrew on race morning.

Pos	No.	Name	Lap 1 (mph)	Lap 2 (mph)	Lap 3 (mph)	Lap 4 (mph)	Average Speed (mph)	Notes
29	18	(United States) Benny Shoaff					102.409	
30	26	(United States) Ira Hall R					96.886	
31	29	(United States) Henry Kohlert R					93.545	

- Source: The Indianapolis News The Indianapolis Star

=== Wednesday May 30 ===
Two drivers, Wilbur Shaw and Jim Hill, received permission to qualify their cars at 5:00 a.m. on race morning. However, only Shaw took to the track. Shaw put Peter DePaolo's car in the field, a car repaired after the crash on Saturday. DePaolo was brought to the track by an ambulance, and cheered on the team lying on a stretcher trackside.

During practice runs just before the race, L. L. Corum and Dutch Baumann crashed their cars. Corum crashed in turn three. Baumann lost control in turn two and wrecked, but was not injured. Both cars were too damaged to race and both cars were withdrawn before the race started.

Pos	No.	Name	Lap 1 (mph)	Lap 2 (mph)	Lap 3 (mph)	Lap 4 (mph)	Average Speed (mph)	Notes
32	1	(United States) Wilbur Shaw					100.956	
—	31	(United States) Jim Hill					N/A	Did not qualify

== Starting grid ==
Row	Inside	Middle	Outside
1	(United States) Leon Duray	(United States) Cliff Woodbury	(United States) Cliff Bergere
2	(United States) Tony Gulotta	(United States) Babe Stapp	(United States) Ralph Hepburn
3	(United States) Louis Schneider	(United States) Lou Moore R	(United States) Fred Comer
4	(United States) Ray Keech R	(United States) Johnny Seymour R	(United States) George Souders W
5	(United States) Louis Meyer R	(United States) Fred Frame	(United States) Norman Batten
6	(United States) Sam Ross R	(United States) Deacon Litz R	(United States) Cliff Durant
7	(United States) Pete Kreis	(United States) Billy Arnold R	(United States) Jimmy Gleason R
8	(United States) Russ Snowberger R	(United States) Dave Evans	(United States) Earl Devore
9	(United States) Clarence Belt R	(United States) Benny Shoaff	(United States) Ira Hall R
10	(United States) Henry Kohlert R	(United States) Wilbur Shaw	

=== Qualified cars withdrawn ===
- Buddy Marr R (#35) – Practice crash May 29
- Dutch Baumann (#18) – Practice crash May 30; drove relief during the race for Tony Gulotta
- L. L. Corum (#17) – Practice crash May 30

=== Alternates ===
- None

=== Failed to qualify ===
- Jim Hill (#31) – Did not qualify
- Peter DePaolo – Crash during qualifying, injured
- Kelly Petillo (#29) – Practice crash
- Chet Miller (#35) – Practice crash
- Herman Schurch (#37) – Engine threw a rod
- Shorty Cantlon (#36) – Did not arrive; drove relief during the race for Henry Kohlert
- Prince Ghica-Cantacuzino (#42) – Did not arrive
- Bill Spence; drove relief during the race for Billy Arnold
- Phil Shafer

== Race summary ==
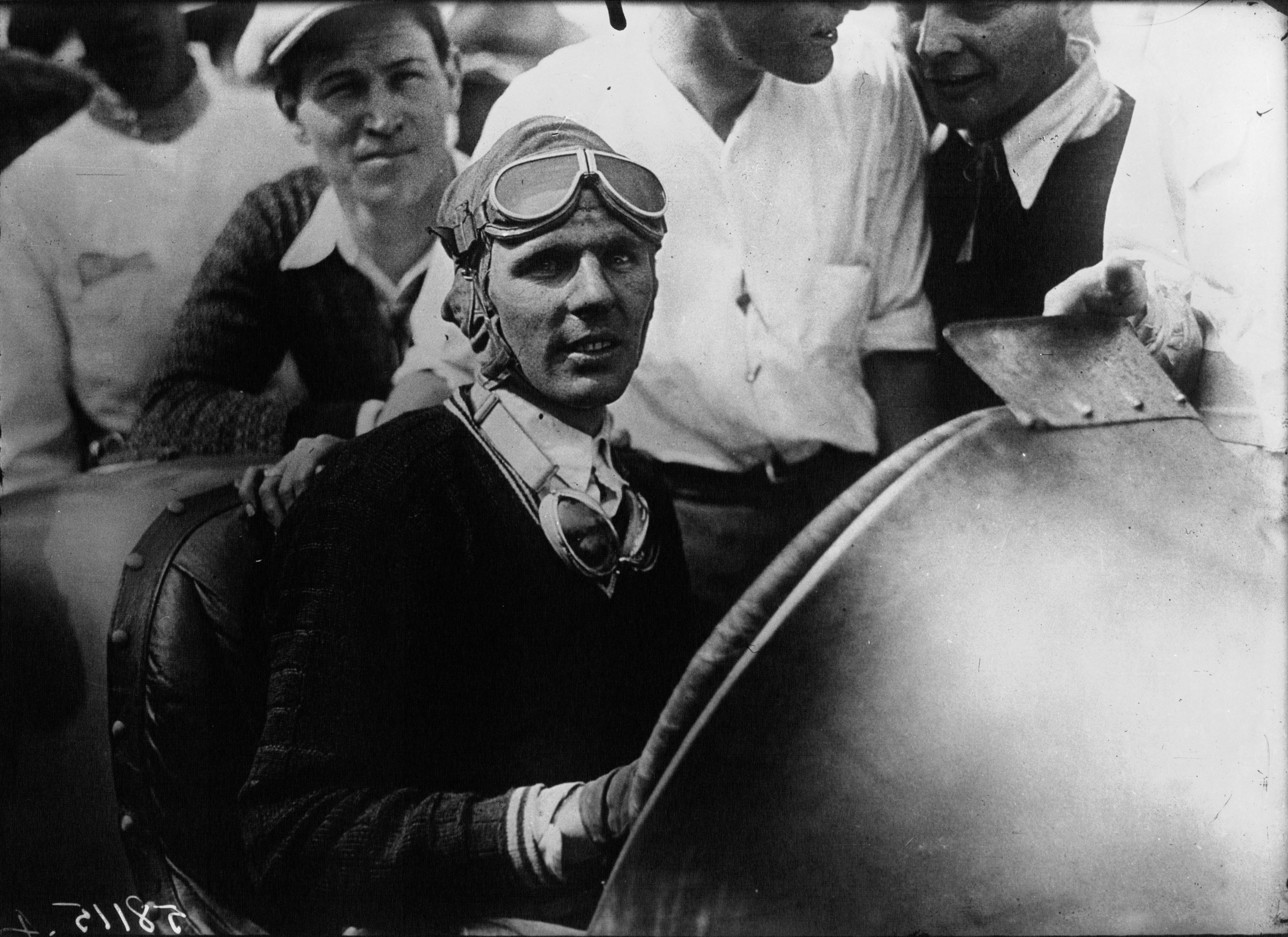
Louis Meyer

Morning rain threatened to postpone the start of the race, scheduled for 10:00 a.m. central standard time. The first shower came through the area at 6:30 a.m., followed by another brief shower at 8:30 a.m. About fifteen minutes later, the rain stopped and the track began to dry. Changes to the starting lineup shuffled the grid Wednesday morning. With Wilbur Shaw putting the DePaolo car in the field, his car was placed at the rear of the field. Meanwhile, three cars were withdrawn on race morning due to crashes. Buddy Marr's car, wrecked on Tuesday, was not repaired in enough time and was scratched. L. L. Corum and Dutch Baumann both suffered crashes during practice runs early Wednesday morning, and both were withdrawn. Both crashes were blamed on the damp conditions. Corum was not seriously injured, and planned to drive relief for other cars during the race.

Jim Hill was unable to qualify, and there were no alternates, so the 33-car field would be short by four cars. Only 29 cars lined up in the grid to take the starter's flag.

=== Start ===
The track was still damp, but officials deemed it adequately dry for racing. The sun had come out, and the brick surface was drying quickly. With rain showers holding off, pace car driver Joe Dawson led the field around for one warm up lap. The field received the red starter's flag, and the race started on time.

Leon Duray grabbed the lead from the pole position at the start. The first lap was run at 113.279 mph, and Duray held a four car-length lead at the conclusion of the first lap. Cliff Woodbury ran second with Cliff Bergere in third. Benny Shoaff (lap 3) made a pit stop to adjust the distributor, and Fred Comer (lap 4) was also in the pits to change a tire.

Russ Snowberger was the first car out of the race, suffering a broken supercharger. Then, after starting in the outside of the front row, Cliff Bergere was out on lap 6 with a broken distributor shaft.

=== First half ===
Leon Duray dominated the early stages of the race. His average speed after 20 laps (50 miles) was 107.078 mph – over a mile per hour faster than the previous year. With Bergere out, Tony Gulotta moved up to second place, Babe Stapp was in third, Louis Schneider in fourth, and Jimmy Gleason was in fifth. Cliff Woodbury was forced to make a pit stop to change spark plugs. He lost nearly three minutes, and fell two laps down.

On lap 35, Benny Shoaff hit an oil slick in the south end of the track and spun out. The car crashed into the outside wall, rebounded, and came to rest facing the opposite direction. Shoaff's suffered a bloody nose, but no major injuries. Shoaff headed back to the pits, and would later drive relief for Fred Frame. Wilbur Shaw, the last qualifier who put his car in the field just that morning, was never a factor. Starting last (29th) in the same car that Peter DePaolo wrecked just days earlier, he lasted only 42 laps. He was another victim of broken timing gears. Shaw returned to the pits, and stood by to drive relief.

At the 100 mile mark (40 laps), Duray continued to lead, with Gulotta in second. Duray and Babe Stapp traded the lead for a few laps, but soon after Duray began to fade. After leading 59 of the first 62 laps, Duray's car was beginning to suffer overheating problems and he began to slip in the standings.

Defending race winner George Souders came to the lead on lap 63, and led for 16 laps. Souders reported that his car was difficult to handle, but he was able to run a consistent pace and stay near the front of the field. Cliff Woodbury, who started in the middle of the front row and had been plagued with mechanical problems early on, dropped out with 55 laps completed due to broken timing gears.

On lap 80 (200 miles) first-year starter Louis Meyer had charged up to fourth position.

As the race approached the halfway point, it was Jimmy Gleason (who started deep in the field), that was now the fastest car on the track. Gleason took the lead from Babe Stapp on lap 83, and set out to lead over the next 100 miles.

A leaking gasoline line on Ray Keech's car was beginning to cause the car to lose fuel pressure. Keech handed the car over to relief driver Wilbur Shaw, but Shaw did not last very long with burns on his leg due to the leaking fuel. Keech got back in the car, and pushed on.

=== Second half ===
Leon Duray's day finally came to an end after 133 laps. The car went out with overheating trouble while Cliff Woodbury was behind the wheel. Jimmy Gleason led until a pit stop on lap 135. He handed the car over to Russ Snowberger who drove relief for the next 13 laps. Snowberger maintained the lead in Gleason's car.

Ira Hall crashed out after competing 115 laps. Lou Wilson took over as relief driver for Louis Schneider. Then Scheinder himself got behind the wheel of Lou Moore's car. Both drivers finished the remainder of the race that way.

The final 100 miles was set to be a three-car battle between the cars of Jimmy Gleason, Tony Gulotta, and the steady but gaining Louis Meyer. Louis Schneider, now driving Lou Moore's car, was also inching closer to the leaders.

Shortly after 2:00 p.m., when the leaders had just passed the 400-mile mark (lap 160), a light rain began to fall. Officials put out the yellow flag and the drivers were instructed to proceed with caution. Officials contemplated halting the race (as has happened two years earlier) for safety reasons, but the shower was very brief. After only a few laps under yellow, the field went back to racing. At that moment, on his 162nd lap, Earl Devore skidded coming out of the north turns due to the wet conditions and eventually crashed into the outside wall in turn one. The fuel tank was crushed, and Devore was out of the race.

=== Finish ===
With twenty laps to go, Tony Gulotta led Jimmy Gleason and Louis Meyer. A margin of only 2.04 seconds separated 1st-2nd-3rd place. On lap 181, Gulotta began slowing down and stalled in turn three. A tiny leak in the fuel tank was causing his fuel pressure to drop, and his fuel line was clogged. Gulotta's crew would need an hour-long pit stop to make repairs. Gulotta and Dutch Baumann took turns nursing the car around to 10th-place finish. Meyer took the lead on lap 182, but Gleason was in second, and was in close contention.

On lap 195, Gleason headed for the pits to take on water for the radiator. A crew member missed the radiator and accidentally doused the car's magneto with water. The engine was ruined with a cracked water jacket as well, and Gleason was out of the race in sight of a chance for victory. Louis Meyer cruised at a steady pace to victory, winning by a little less than one lap margin over a charging Louis Schneider (in Lou Moore's car). Meyer is credited as a being a rookie winner, since his previous experience in the 1927 race was only in a relief driver role. Meyer made only one pit stop, a routine stop for oil, fuel, and to change two tires.

Ray Keech, despite bad burns on his leg, remarkably came home fourth. All three cars of the front row dropped out, and yet again, the supercharged front-engine machines failed to achieve victory. The highest finishing front wheel drive car was Babe Stapp in 6th place.

- Sources: The Indianapolis News 500 Miles To Go

== Box score ==
Finish	Start	No	Name	Entrant	Car	Qual	Laps	Status
1	13	14	(United States) Louis Meyer R	Alden Sampson II	Miller	111.352	200	99.482 mph
2	8	28	(United States) Lou Moore R (Louis Schneider Laps 133–200)	Charles Haase	Miller	113.826	200	+43.89
3	12	3	(United States) George Souders W	William S. White	Miller	111.444	200	+4:27.29
4	10	15	(United States) Ray Keech R (Wilbur Shaw Laps 87–116)	M. A. Yagle	Miller	113.421	200	+19:54.73
5	15	22	(United States) Norman Batten (Zeke Meyer Laps 81-200)	Norman K. Batten	Fengler–Miller	106.585	200	+20:13.75
6	5	7	(United States) Babe Stapp (Ralph Hepburn Laps 122–145)	Phil Shafer	Miller	116.887	200	+22:16.66
7	20	43	(United States) Billy Arnold R (Bill Spence Laps 36–103) (Bill Spence Laps 151–169)	Boyle Valve Company	Miller	111.926	200	+27:42.34
8	14	27	(United States) Fred Frame (Ralph Hepburn Laps 178–185) (Benny Shoaff Laps 186–200)	William S. White	Duesenberg	107.501	200	+31:28.63
9	9	25	(United States) Fred Comer (Cliff Woodbury Laps 92-200)	Boyle Valve Company	Miller	113.690	200	+34:08.37
10	4	8	(United States) Tony Gulotta (Dutch Baumann Laps 68–117) (Dutch Baumann Laps 184–197)	J. R. Burgamy	Miller	117.031	200	+35:56.36
11	7	24	(United States) Louis Schneider (Lou Wilson Laps 91–101) (Lou Wilson Laps 106–200)	Louis F. Schneider	Miller	114.036	200	+39:29.08
12	23	12	(United States) Dave Evans	Boyle Valve Company	Miller	108.264	200	+41:41.06
13	28	29	(United States) Henry Kohlert R (Shorty Cantlon Laps 6-58) (W. E. Shattuc Laps 59–115) (Shorty Cantlon Laps 116–180)	Elgin Piston Pin Company	Miller	93.545	180	Flagged
14	17	23	(United States) Deacon Litz R (Wesley Crawford Laps 67–154)	A. B. Litz	Miller	106.213	161	Flagged
15	21	39	(United States) Jimmy Gleason R (Russ Snowberger Laps 136–147)	H. C. Henning	Duesenberg	111.708	195	Magneto
16	18	5	(United States) Cliff Durant (Bob McDonogh Laps 105–175)	Tommy Milton	Detroit–Miller	99.990	175	Supercharger
17	11	33	(United States) Johnny Seymour R	Cooper Engineering Company	Cooper–Miller	111.671	170	Supercharger
18	24	6	(United States) Earl Devore (Cy Marshall Laps 91–148)	Metals Protection Company	Miller	109.810	161	Crash T1
19	1	4	(United States) Leon Duray (Cliff Bergere Laps 92–133)	Leon Duray	Miller	122.391	133	Overheating
20	16	38	(United States) Sam Ross R	Reed & Mulligan	Miller	106.572	132	Timing gears
21	27	26	(United States) Ira Hall R (Jack Petticord Laps 104–115)	Henry Maley	Duesenberg	96.886	115	Crash T1
22	19	32	(United States) Pete Kreis	Cooper Engineering Company	Cooper–Miller	112.906	73	Rod bearing
23	2	10	(United States) Cliff Woodbury	Boyle Valve Company	Miller	120.418	55	Timing gears
24	6	16	(United States) Ralph Hepburn	Harry A. Miller	Miller	116.354	48	Timing gears
25	29	1	(United States) Wilbur Shaw	Peter DePaolo	Miller	100.956	42	Timing gears
26	26	18	(United States) Benny Shoaff	Duesenberg Brothers	Duesenberg	102.409	35	Crash T1
27	25	41	(United States) Clarence Belt R	Green Engineering Company	Green	96.026	32	Valve
28	3	21	(United States) Cliff Bergere	Cliff Bergere	Miller	119.956	7	Supercharger
29	22	34	(United States) Russ Snowberger R	Cooper Engineering Company	Miller	111.618	4	Supercharger

Note: Relief drivers in parentheses

W Former Indianapolis 500 winner

R Indianapolis 500 Rookie

=== Statistics ===
Lap Leaders
Laps	Leader
1-54	Leon Duray
55-57	Babe Stapp
58-62	Leon Duray
63-78	George Souders
79-82	Jimmy Gleason
83-96	Babe Stapp
97-135	Jimmy Gleason
136-148	Russ Snowberger
149-181	Tony Gulotta
182-200	Louis Meyer

Total laps led
Leader	Laps
Leon Duray	59
Jimmy Gleason	43
Tony Gulotta	33
Louis Meyer	19
Babe Stapp	17
George Souders	16
Russ Snowberger	13

== Broadcasting ==
The race was carried live on radio on WKBF-AM, in a partnership arranged with the Indianapolis News. The broadcast began at 9:30 a.m. local time, and was about six hours in duration. It was the fourth consecutive year the race was being carried on the radio through this format. WFBM also picked up the broadcast. The broadcast originated from the Pagoda, with microphones also set up in the pit area. The booth announcing staff was led by Chris Albion. John Mannix led the pit reporting crew.

For the first time ever, NBC came on air for live national coverage of the final hour of the race. At approximately 2:10 p.m., anchor Graham McNamee's call was picked up on WKBF and numerous other NBC affiliates across the country.

== Notes ==
=== Works cited ===
- Indianapolis 500 History: Race & All-Time Stats – Official Site
- 1928 International 500 Mile Sweepstakes at ChampCarStats.com

=== References ===
Grand Prix Race
Previous race: 1927 British Grand Prix	1928 Grand Prix season Grandes Épreuves	Next race: 1928 Italian Grand Prix
Previous race: 1927 Indianapolis 500	Indianapolis 500	Next race: 1929 Indianapolis 500
