= 1927 Indianapolis 500 =

American motor race

15th Indianapolis 500
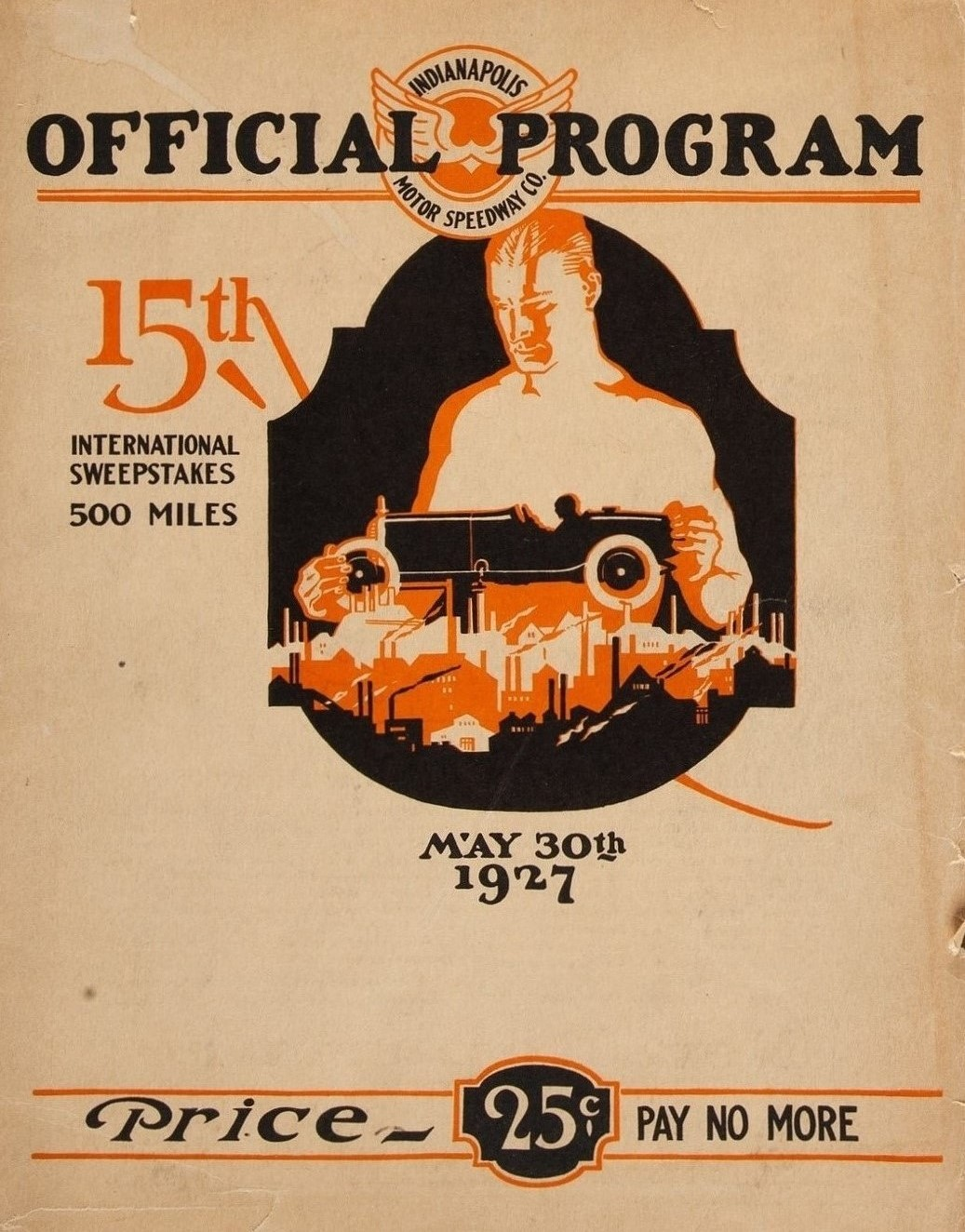

Indianapolis Motor Speedway

Indianapolis 500
- Sanctioning body: AAA
- Date: May 30, 1927
- Winner: George Souders
- Winning Entrant: William S. White
- Winning Chief Mechanic: Jean Marcenac
- Winning time: 5:07:33.08
- Average speed: 97.545 mph (156.983 km/h)
- Pole position: Frank Lockhart
- Pole speed: 120.100 mph (193.282 km/h)
- Most laps led: Frank Lockhart (110)

Pre-race
- Pace car: LaSalle V-8 Series 303
- Pace car driver: Willard "Big Boy" Rader
- Starter: George Townsend
- Honorary referee: Charles F. Kettering
- Estimated attendance: 135,000

Chronology
Previous	Next
1926	1928

The 15th International 500-Mile Sweepstakes Race was held at the Indianapolis Motor Speedway on Monday, May 30, 1927.

First-time starter George Souders won by eight laps, the largest margin since 1913. Souders became the first driver to win the full-500 mile race solo, with neither help from a relief driver, nor accompanied by a riding mechanic.

== Time trials ==
Four-lap (10 mile) qualifying runs were utilized. Frank Lockhart won the pole position with a speed of 120.10 mph. Lockhart set a new 1-lap track record on his final lap.

For the first time, all 33 qualifiers exceeded 100 mph for average speed.

Qualifying Results
Date	Driver	Lap 1 (mph)	Lap 2 (mph)	Lap 3 (mph)	Lap 4 (mph)	Average Speed (mph)
5/26/1927	Frank Lockhart	120.192	119.474	119.824	120.918	120.100

== Starting grid ==
Row	Inside		Middle		Outside	
1	2	(United States) Frank Lockhart W	3	(United States) Pete DePaolo W	12	(United States) Leon Duray
2	1	(United States) Harry Hartz	19	(United States) Ralph Hepburn	15	(United States) Cliff Woodbury
3	14	(United States) Bob McDonogh	7	(United States) Dave Lewis	4	(United States) Bennett Hill
4	8	(United States) Norman Batten	22	(United States) Jack Petticord R	9	(United States) Pete Kreis
5	5	(United States) Frank Elliott	25	(United States) Cliff Bergere R	10	(United States) Earl Devore
6	17	(United States) W. E. Shattuc	26	(United States) Dutch Baumann R	16	(United States) Eddie Hearne
7	29	(United States) Wilbur Shaw R	44	(United States) Al Melcher R	18	(United States) Jules Ellingboe
8	32	(United States) George Souders R	43	(United States) Louis Schneider R	38	(United States) Babe Stapp R
9	6	(United States) Tommy Milton W	41	(United States) Wade Morton	27	(United States) Tony Gulotta
10	21	(United States) Dave Evans R	35	(United States) Al Cotey R	23	(United States) Fred Lecklider
11	24	(United States) Benny Shoaff R	42	(United States) Jim Hill R	31	(United States) Fred Frame R

R Indianapolis 500 rookie
W Indianapolis 500 winner

== Race summary ==
At the start, polesitter Lockhart took the lead and dominated the first half of the race. At the halfway point, he had won almost $10,000 in lap prize money. But on lap 120, his Miller broke a connecting rod, and he was out of the race. He reportedly stepped out, shrugged, smiled, and asked for a hot dog.

After Lockhart's retirement, Pete DePaolo took the lead, driving in relief for Bob McDonogh after his own car dropped out. But a supercharger problem required an extended, unscheduled pit stop to repair. With 60 laps to go, George Souders first took the lead. He steadily pulled away from Babe Stapp, both in Duesenbergs, and cruised to victory by over 12 minutes. Stapp (driving relief for Benny Shoaff), seemingly on his way to second place, broke a rear axle with a lap and a half to go, and the car finished out of the top ten.

== Box score ==
Finish	Start	No	Name	Entrant	Car	Qual	Rank	Laps	Status
1	22	32	(United States) George Souders R	William S. White	Duesenberg	111.551	12	200	97.545 mph
2	15	10	(United States) Earl Devore (Zeke Meyer Laps 97–152)	F. P. Cramer	Miller	107.497	23	200	+12:02.87
3	27	27	(United States) Tony Gulotta (Pete DePaolo Laps 86–92)	Anthony Gulotta	Miller	107.765	22	200	+14:32.80
4	19	29	(United States) Wilbur Shaw R (Louis Meyer Laps 77–129)	Fred Clemons	Miller	104.465	32	200	+14:38.97
5	28	21	(United States) Dave Evans R (Steve Nemesh Laps 57–82)	David E. Evans	Duesenberg	107.360	25	200	+22:54.63
6	7	14	(United States) Bob McDonogh (Pete DePaolo Laps 113–200)	Cooper Engineering Company	Cooper–Miller	113.175	8	200	+24:16.26
7	18	16	(United States) Eddie Hearne (Harry Hartz Laps 47–81) (Leon Duray Laps 116–130) (Ira Vail Laps 131–154)	Harry Hartz	Miller	105.115	31	200	+25:32.66
8	25	6	(United States) Tommy Milton W (C. W. Van Ranst Laps 82–106) (Ralph Hepburn Laps 107–200)	Tommy Milton	Detroit–Miller	108.758	20	200	+45:03.13
9	14	25	(United States) Cliff Bergere R (Wesley Crawford Laps 96–108) (Wesley Crawford Laps 147–176)	Muller Brothers	Miller	108.820	19	200	+1:07:46.99
10	13	5	(United States) Frank Elliott (Fred Frame Laps 54–100)	Frank Elliott	Miller	109.682	17	200	+1:15:52.61
11	33	31	(United States) Fred Frame R (George Fernic Laps 6–68) (George Abell Laps 69–76) (George Fernic Laps 77–123) (George Abell Laps 124–127) (George Fernic Laps 128–199)	O. B. Dolfinger	Miller	106.859	27	199	Flagged
12	32	42	(United States) Jim Hill R (Don Ostrander Laps 30–87) (Don Ostrander Laps 108–115) (Don Ostrander Laps 176–197)	Earl Devore	Miller	107.392	24	197	Flagged
13	31	24	(United States) Benny Shoaff R (Babe Stapp Laps 69–103) (Babe Stapp Laps 173–198)	Duesenberg Brothers	Duesenberg	110.152	13	198	Rear end gears
14	26	41	(United States) Wade Morton (Ralph Holmes Laps 34–63) (Freddie Winnai Laps 64–131) (Ralph Holmes Laps 140–152)	Duesenberg Brothers	Duesenberg	108.075	21	152	Crash
15	20	44	(United States) Al Melcher R (Jack Petticord Laps 44–129) (Fred Lecklider Laps 130–143) (Jack Petticord Laps 143–144)	Charles Haase	Miller	102.918	33	144	Supercharger
16	23	43	(United States) Louis Schneider R (L. L. Corum Laps 88–97) (Dutch Baumann Laps 125–135)	Fred Lecklider	Miller	109.910	15	137	Timing gears
17	12	9	(United States) Pete Kreis	Cooper Engineering Company	Cooper–Miller	109.900	16	123	Front axle
18	1	2	(United States) Frank Lockhart W (Harry Hartz Laps 101–123)	Frank S. Lockhart	Miller	120.100	1	120	Rod
19	6	15	(United States) Cliff Woodbury (Ralph Hepburn Laps 71–80)	Cliff Woodbury	Miller	113.200	7	108	Supercharger
20	17	26	(United States) Dutch Baumann R	Harry S. Miller	Miller	106.078	29	90	Pinion shaft
21	29	35	(United States) Al Cotey R (Eddie Burbach Laps 63–87)	Al Cotey	Miller	106.295	28	87	Universal joint
22	16	17	(United States) W. E. Shattuc	Dr. W. E. Shattuc, M.D.	Miller	107.060	26	83	Valve
23	30	23	(United States) Fred Lecklider (Henry Kohlert Laps 17–49)	Henry Kohlert	Miller	105.729	30	49	Crash T1
24	5	19	(United States) Ralph Hepburn	Cliff Woodbury	Miller	114.209	5	39	Fuel tank leak
25	4	1	(United States) Harry Hartz	Harry Hartz	Miller	116.739	4	38	Crankshaft
26	2	3	(United States) Peter DePaolo W	Peter DePaolo	Miller	119.510	2	31	Supercharger
27	3	12	(United States) Leon Duray	Leon Duray	Miller	118.788	3	26	Fuel tank leak
28	9	4	(United States) Bennett Hill	Cooper Engineering Company	Miller	112.013	10	26	Shackle bolt
29	21	18	(United States) Jules Ellingboe	Earl Cooper	Miller	113.239	6	25	Crash T4
30	10	8	(United States) Norman Batten	Norman K. Batten	Fengler–Miller	111.940	11	24	Caught fire
31	24	38	(United States) Babe Stapp R	Duesenberg Brothers	Duesenberg	109.555	18	24	Universal joint
32	11	22	(United States) Jack Petticord R	Cliff Woodbury	Miller	109.920	14	22	Supercharger
33	8	7	(United States) Dave Lewis	Dave Lewis	Miller	112.275	9	21	Front axle

Note: Relief drivers in parentheses

W Former Indianapolis 500 winner

R Indianapolis 500 Rookie

=== Race statistics ===
Lap Leaders
Laps	Leader
1-81	Frank Lockhart
82–90	Dutch Baumann
91–119	Frank Lockhart
120–149	Pete DePaolo
150–200	George Souders

Total laps led
Leader	Laps
Frank Lockhart	110
George Souders	51
Pete DePaolo	30
Dutch Baumann	9

== Race details ==
For 1927, riding mechanics were optional; however, no teams utilized them.

Eddie Hearne was the only driver in the field who had competed at the inaugural Indy 500. This would be the final time a driver from the inaugural race would compete.

Grand Prix Race
Previous race: 1926 Italian Grand Prix	1927 Grand Prix season Grandes Épreuves	Next race: 1927 French Grand Prix
Previous race: 1926 Indianapolis 500	Indianapolis 500	Next race: 1928 Indianapolis 500
