= Henry Kohlert =

American racing driver (1892–1939)

- Born: March 8, 1892 St. Charles, Illinois, U.S.
- Died: December 18, 1939 (aged 47) St. Charles, Illinois, U.S.

Champ Car career
- 1 race run over 1 year
- First race: 1928 Indianapolis 500 (Indianapolis)
Wins	Podiums	Poles
0	0	0

Henry Kohlert (March 8, 1892 – December 18, 1939) was an American racing driver and aviator.

== Biography ==
Kohlert served in the United States Army 67th Balloon Corps during World War 1. After the war he became an Automotive Mechanic, Automotive Dealer and Race car Driver. He raced a 1924 Miller 122 converted to a supercharged 91 cubic inch per AAA rules. He purchased the car from fellow racer and Indianapolis 500 winner Tommy Milton in 1926. He raced in the 1927 Indianapolis 500 replacing Fred Lecklider on lap 19. On lap 49 at the 120 mile mark, Cliff Bergere collided with him causing him to be thrown from the car. The car flipped three times in mid-air as Bergere passed underneath. A bystander jumped on the track and pulled him into the infield where he was mistaken for dead. He was rushed to the hospital and was released a few weeks later. During this time he recovered with fellow racer Norman Batten who was burned when his car caught fire in the race. A year later, Kohlert qualified for the 1928 Indianapolis 500 and finished 13th. Afterwards, he sold the car and bought a 1928 Waco 9 biplane. He leased land from a local farmer, and after three years, sold the interest to the plane and the field to a group of businessmen. The field later became known as Dupage Airport in West Chicago Illinois. All the time he ran an Automotive Dealership in St. Charles Illinois which sold Nash and Ford cars. In 1937, he purchased Batten's Miller Fengler/Junior 8 from Batten's widow. He installed a 122 Miller engine from Harry Hartz's Indianapolis winner and with several modifications included bigger brakes and a better oiling system Kohlert entered the car with Chicago dirt track racer Duke Nalon at the wheel. The car placed 11th in 1938, and Kohlert came back to qualify with Nalon and the car in 1939 but a broken camshaft ended the run before the car could qualify.

== Motorsports career results ==
=== Indianapolis 500 results ===
Year	Car	Start	Qual	Rank	Finish	Laps	Led	Retired
1928	29	28	93.545	29	13	180	0	Flagged
Totals						180	0	

Starts	1
Poles	0
Front Row	0
Wins	0
Top 5	0
Top 10	0
Retired	0
