= Leon Duray =

American racing driver (1894–1956)

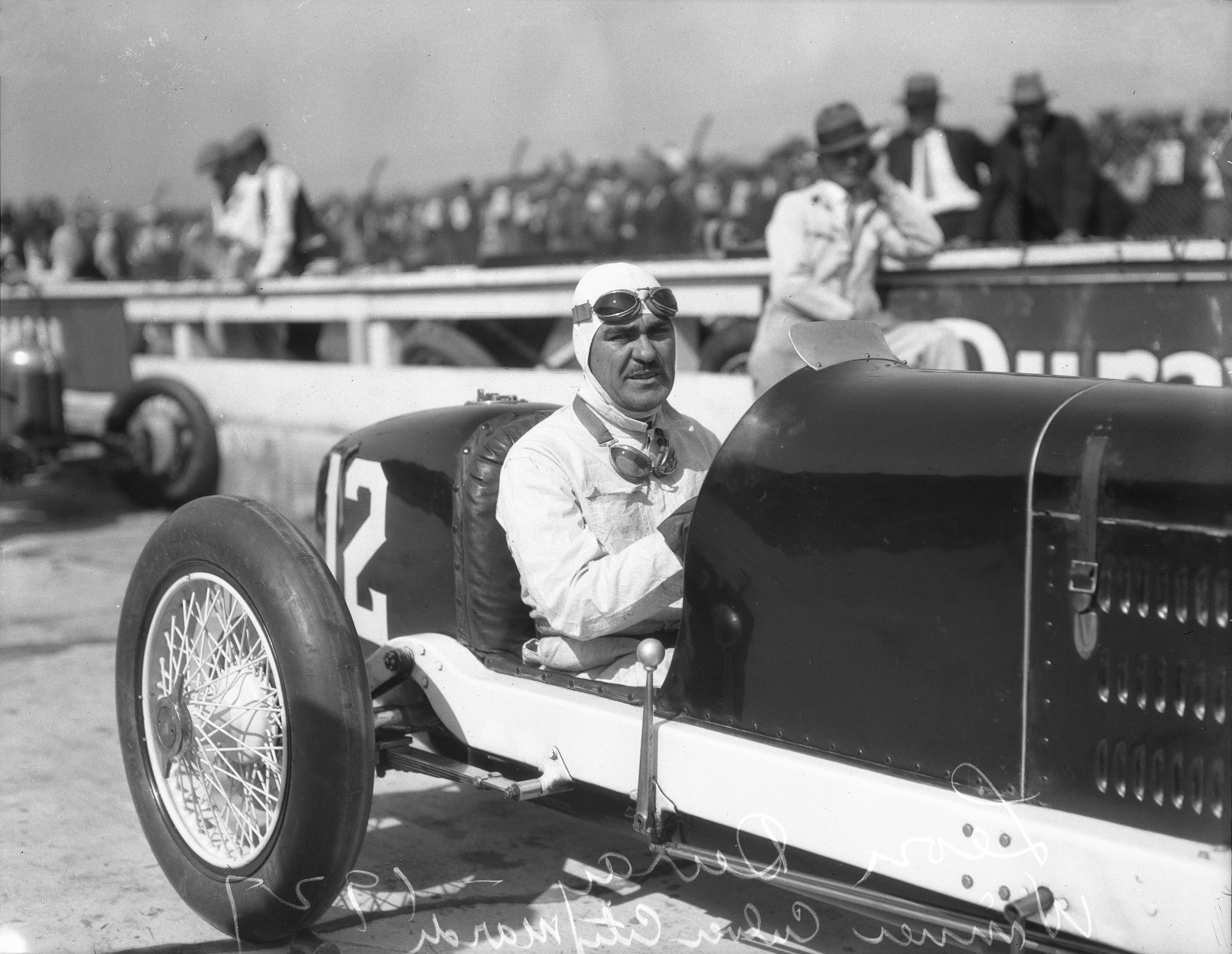
- Duray at Culver City Speedway in 1927
- Born: George Gardner Stewart; April 30, 1894 Cleveland, Ohio, U.S.
- Died: May 12, 1956 (aged 62) Twentynine Palms, California, U.S.

Champ Car career
- 50 races run over 10 years
- Best finish: 4th (1927)
- First race: 1922 Indianapolis 500 (Indianapolis)
- Last race: 1931 Indianapolis 500 (Indianapolis)
- First win: 1926 25-mile Heat #2 (Rockingham Park)
- Last win: 1928 15-mile Preliminary (Rockingham Park)
| Wins | Podiums | Poles |
|---|---|---|
| 4 | 9 | 7 |

Leon Duray (born George Gardner Stewart; April 30, 1894 – May 12, 1956) was an American racing driver active in the 1920s. He was nicknamed "The Flying Frenchman", and legally changed his name in tribute to pioneer auto racer Arthur Duray.

== Motorsports career results ==
=== Indianapolis 500 results ===
| Year | Car | Start | Qual | Rank | Finish | Laps | Led | Retired |
|---|---|---|---|---|---|---|---|---|
| 1922 | 4 | 4 | 99.250 | 4 | 22 | 94 | 2 | Axle |
| 1923 | 28 | 21 | 89.900 | 20 | 13 | 136 | 0 | Rod |
| 1925 | 28 | 1 | 113.196 | 1 | 6 | 200 | 0 | Running |
| 1926 | 10 | 3 | 109.186 | 3 | 23 | 33 | 0 | Broken axle |
| 1927 | 12 | 3 | 118.788 | 3 | 27 | 26 | 0 | Fuel tank leak |
| 1928 | 4 | 1 | 122.391 | 1 | 19 | 133 | 59 | Overheating |
| 1929 | 21 | 2 | 119.087 | 2 | 22 | 65 | 7 | Carburetor |
| 1931 | 54 | 29 | 103.134 | 32 | 37 | 6 | 0 | Overheating |
| Totals | | | | | | 693 | 68 | |

| Starts | 8 |
| Poles | 2 |
| Front Row | 5 |
| Wins | 0 |
| Top 5 | 0 |
| Top 10 | 1 |
| Retired | 7 |

- Duray's starts from 1925 thru 1929 stood as the best five race starting streak from 1929 until 1990, when his record was bested by Rick Mears. His streak currently stands as third best in "500" history.
- Leon Duray "Jigger" Sirois, a USAC Indy car driver active in the 1960s and 1970s, was named after Leon Duray.
