= Fernic T-9 =

T-9
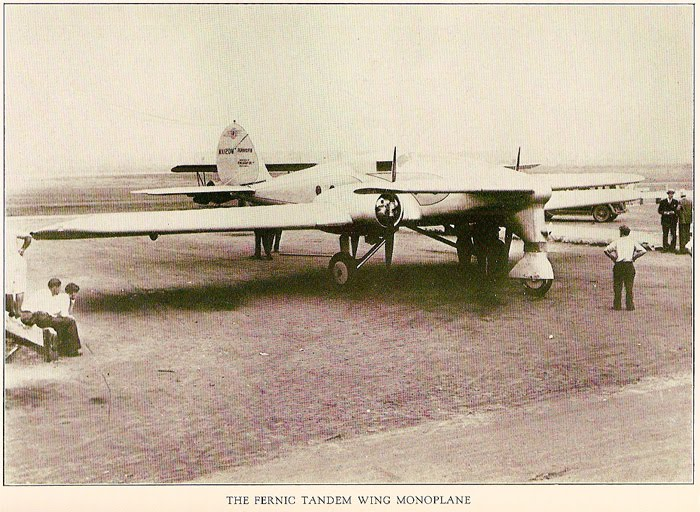

General information
- Type: Distance record setting light aircraft
- National origin: United States
- Manufacturer: Fernic Aircraft Corporation
- Designer: George Fernic, Paul Dronin

History
- First flight: 10 September 1929

The Fernic T-9, also called the Fernic F.T.9, (Fernic Tandem model 9) is an early three-surface aircraft, having two lifting wings in tandem as well as a conventional tailplane. It was a light twin-engined craft intended for flight distance record setting.

== Design and development ==
Designer George Fernic was a Romanian aviator who developed the T-9 after emigrating to the United States from Germany.

The Fernic T-9 can be seen as a conventional twin-engined monoplane with the addition of a 22-foot-long (6.7 m) nose-mounted canard foreplane to provide two lifting surfaces in tandem. The canard was designed to stall ahead of the main wing, reducing the risk of stalling or spinning the entire aircraft. The plywood covered aircraft also featured tricycle landing gear with a castering nose wheel. A spring steel tail skid was added to protect the tail.

Fernic tested the design with professor Alexander Klemin in the wind tunnels of the Guggenheim School of Aeronautics, New York University in 1926. For the transatlantic effort, the upper engine nacelles were able to be removed and powered with a small outboard motor for water ditching.

== Operational history ==
The T-9 was first flown at Roosevelt Field in New York on 10 September 1929. The landing gear and wings were damaged on its second day of test flying. A record flight from the United States to Bucharest, Romania was planned with the prototype. Fernic did not complete the flight due to a fatal accident he suffered while landing his later three-surface design, the Fernic FT-10 Cruisaire in 1930.

== Specifications (Fernic T-9) ==
Data from Skyways #55

General characteristics

- Length: 41 ft 6 in (12.65 m)
- Wingspan: 59 ft (18 m)
- Gross weight: 5,500 lb (2,495 kg)
- Fuel capacity: 1,100 U.S. gallons (4,200 L; 920 imp gal)
- Powerplant: 2 × Wright Whirlwind J-5 radial engine, 225 hp (168 kW) each

Performance

- Maximum speed: 110 kn (130 mph, 210 km/h)
- Cruise speed: 100 kn (120 mph, 190 km/h)
- Stall speed: 43 kn (50 mph, 80 km/h)
- Range: 4,300 nmi (5,000 mi, 8,000 km)
