= Dutch Baumann =

American racing driver (1897–1930)

- Born: Charles Albin Baumann; October 18, 1897 Indianapolis, Indiana, U.S.
- Died: August 18, 1930 (aged 32) Kankakee, Illinois, U.S.

Champ Car career
- 1 race run over 1 year
- Best finish: 24th (1928)
- First race: 1927 Indianapolis 500 (Indianapolis)
Wins	Podiums	Poles
0	0	0

Charles Albin "Dutch" Baumann (October 18, 1897 – August 18, 1930) was an American racing driver.

== Biography ==
Baumann was born on October 18, 1897, in Indianapolis, Indiana. He participated in the 1927 Indianapolis 500.

Baumann qualified for the 1928 Indianapolis 500 but suffered a crash during a practice run on the morning of the race. He served as a relief driver for Tony Gulotta.

Baumann died on August 18, 1930, in Kankakee, Illinois, during the first lap of a 15-mile race when he was thrown from his car and impaled on a fence rail. In the same race, Byron Salpaugh broke his arm when he was thrown from his auto.

== Motorsports career results ==
=== Indianapolis 500 results ===
Year	Car	Start	Qual	Rank	Finish	Laps	Led	Retired
1927	26	17	106.078	29	20	90	9	Pinion shaft
Totals						90	9	

Starts	1
Poles	0
Front Row	0
Wins	0
Top 5	0
Top 10	0
Retired	1
