= Russ Snowberger =

American racing driver (1901–1968)

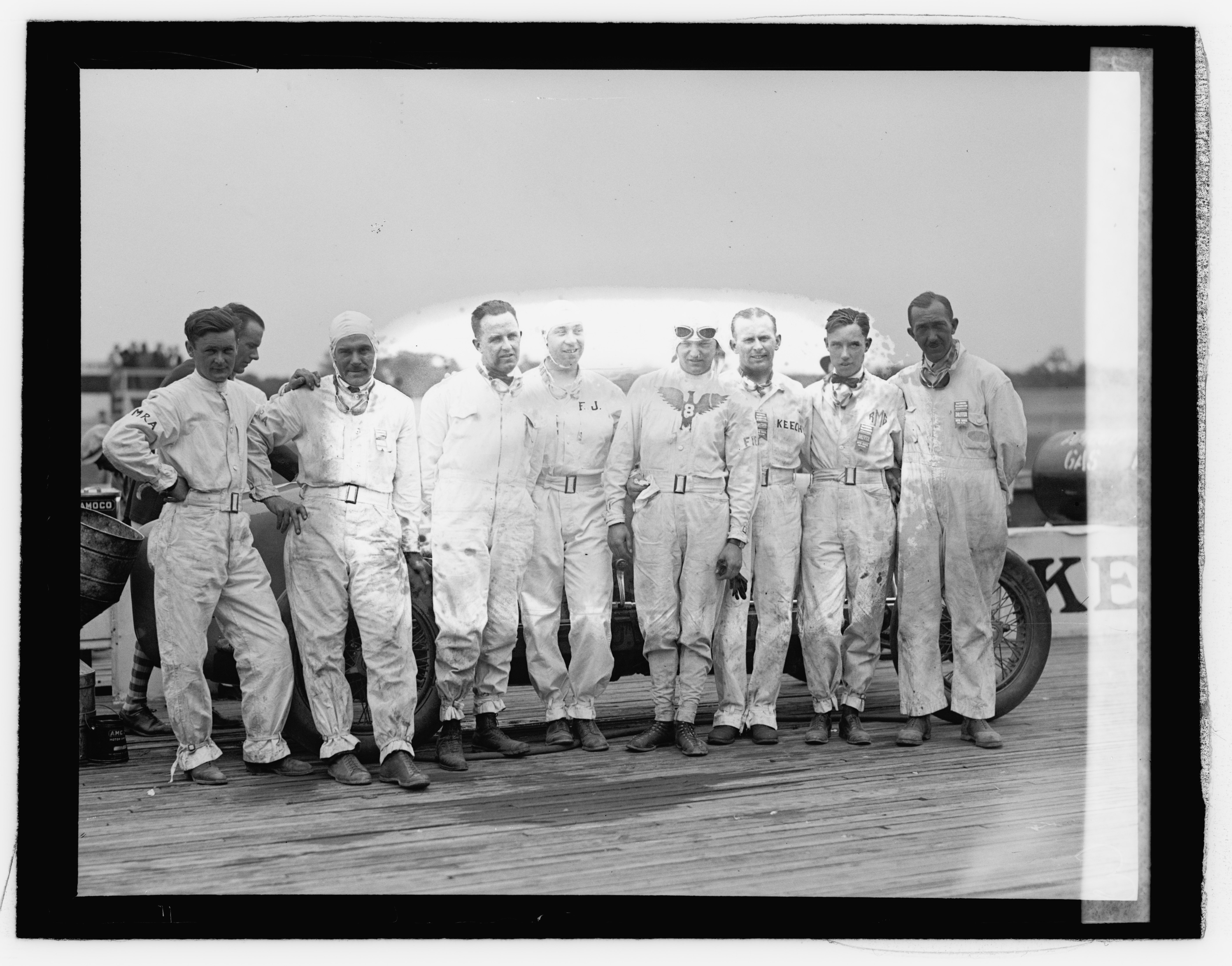
- Dawson, Snowberger, Aspen, Gleason, Winnai, Keech, Desmond, Pugh
- Born: Russell Neighbors Snowberger; October 8, 1901 Denton, Maryland, U.S.
- Died: September 28, 1968 (aged 66) Mount Clemens, Michigan, U.S.

Champ Car career
- 53 races run over 20 years
- Best finish: 3rd (tie) (1934)
- First race: 1927 Altoona 200 #2 (Altoona)
- Last race: 1950 Pikes Peak Hill Climb (Pikes Peak)
Wins	Podiums	Poles
0	6	2

Russell Neighbors Snowberger (October 8, 1901 – September 28, 1968) was an American racing driver and owner active from the 1920s through the 1950s. After his lengthy Indianapolis career, Snowberger continued his affiliation with the "500" by sponsoring entries throughout the 1950s.

== Early life ==
Snowberger was born on October 8, 1901, in Denton, Maryland.

== Career ==
Snowberger drove his first race in 1921 at the fairgrounds at Harrington, Delaware. By the middle 1920s he was becoming a consistent winner, including the first 100 miler run at Langhorne, Pennsylvania. Snowberger won the national motor racing association championship in 1926. He was a fierce competitor on the board superspeedways as well as the dirt tracks.

In 1927, Snowberger joined the American Automobile Association and was in the starting lineup at 1928 Indianapolis 500. Snowberger's car was the first one to drop out with mechanical problems but he drove relief for Jimmy Gleason and led the race for eleven laps. Ironically the winning car was prepared by Snowberger for him to drive in the race, however the owner had to sell it shortly before the race needing the money. In November of that same year Snowberger was one of the Studebaker team drivers to run 24 hours non stop at the Atlantic City board track.

With the Great Depression came rule changes by AAA to keep auto racing alive. Now allowing stock block engines, men such as Snowberger with small budgets could compete. In 1930 he finished second in five of the seven champ car races that season. In the other two races he blew a head gasket at Altoona and finished eighth in the Indianapolis 500. He most likely would have done better if not for a 17 minute pit stop for a broken shock tower repair. With a total investment of fourteen hundred dollars he finished fourth in the AAA championship. For the entire season he spent a dollar and a quarter for gasket material and ended up winning over $10,000. in prize money. More than most bank presidents showed for the year.

For 1931, Snowberger won the coveted pole position at Indianapolis with the same car and Studebaker engine. A record lasting 54 years until 1985. With some tire problems during the race he still managed to finish in fifth place. Again in 1932 he finished fifth, and eighth the following years. He became known as the King of the Stock Blocks. In 1935, he was a charter member of the famed Champion Spark Plugs 100 Mile An hour Club.

Snowberger secured a ride in one of Mike Boyle's Miller Specials in 1935, but dropped out of Indianapolis. Next it was Joel Thorne, heir to a vast fortune, who beckoned to Snowberger to pilot one of his cars. He did not make the race however as he hit the wall during practice and was injured. It was in 1937 that Snowberger and Thorne separated, with Snowberger building a new car with a Packard straight eight in it. On lap 66 he retired with a slipping clutch. Snowberger also ran in the Vanderbilt Cup Race in 1936 and 1937 finishing eighth in 1937 along with seventh place at Pikes Peak Hill Climb. He also prepared six winning cars for the Pikes Peak Hill Climb driven by Louis Unser between 1938 and 1955. It was in 1938 that Snowberger put his Indianapolis car in the middle of the front row between Floyd Roberts and Rex Mays. Another year he had the win in his sights until a rod broke putting him out

During World War II, Snowberger worked at Packard, where he was in charge of all dyno testing of the Rolls-Royce engines for the P-51 Mustangs. Capt. Eddie Rickenbacker was instrumental in putting Snowberger in this position.

Snowberger ran again at Indianapolis in 1946 and 1947 but dropped out both years with mechanical problems. In 1951 Snowberger ran his last race, which was the Pikes Peak Hill Climb. After retiring as an active driver he spent the rest of his career as chief mechanic on the Federal Engineering team out of Detroit, Michigan from 1947 until he prepared his last Indy car for 1961. From 1962 until his death, Snowberger ran a production machine company.

== Later life and death ==
Snowberger died on September 28, 1968, in Mount Clemens, Michigan, and is buried in Clinton Grove Cemetery in Clinton Township, Macomb County, Michigan.

== Legacy ==
- Inducted into the Michigan Motor Sports Hall of Fame in 1985.
- Inducted into the Delaware Sports Hall of Fame in 1988.

== Motorsports career results ==
=== Indianapolis 500 results ===
Year	Car	Start	Qual	Rank	Finish	Laps	Led	Retired
1928	34	22	111.618	15	29	4	13	Supercharger
1929	12	10	113.622	13	27	45	0	Supercharger
1930	22	7	104.577	11	8	200	0	Running
1931	4	1	112.796	3	5	200	0	Running
1932	4	4	114.326	6	5	200	0	Running
1933	4	17	110.769	27	8	200	0	Running
1934	10	9	111.428	23	8	200	0	Running
1935	3	11	114.209	21	27	59	0	Exhaust pipe
1937	12	30	117.354	27	27	66	0	Clutch
1938	14	2	124.027	3	25	56	0	Rod
1939	21	25	123.199	20	25	50	0	Radiator
1940	19	11	121.564	26	31	38	0	Water pump
1941	42	11	120.104	30	21	107	0	Water pump
1946	25	10	121.593	15	12	134	0	Differential
1947	25	6	121.331	15	19	74	0	Oil pump
Totals						1633	13	

Starts	15
Poles	1
Front Row	2
Wins	0
Top 5	2
Top 10	5
Retired	10

=== As a constructor ===
Season	Driver	Grid	Classification	Points	Note	Race Report
1950	Bill Schindler	22	Ret		Transmission	Report
