= Al Cotey =

American racing driver (1888–1974)

- Born: Albert Edward Cotey; March 19, 1888 Chicago, Illinois, U.S.
- Died: October 27, 1974 (aged 86) New Smyrna Beach, Florida, U.S.

Champ Car career
- 2 races run over 2 years
- First race: 1919 Elgin National Trophy (Elgin)
- Last race: 1927 Indianapolis 500 (Indianapolis)
Wins	Podiums	Poles
0	0	0

Albert Edward Cotey (March 19, 1888 – October 27, 1974) was an American racing driver. He attempted to qualify for the Indianapolis 500 twice; in 1919 he did not qualify, while in 1927 he qualified 29th with a speed of 106.295 mph.

== Motorsports career results ==
=== Indianapolis 500 results ===
Year	Car	Start	Qual	Rank	Finish	Laps	Led	Retired
1927	35	29	106.295	28	21	87	0	Universal joint
Totals						87	0	

Starts	1
Poles	0
Front Row	0
Wins	0
Top 5	0
Top 10	0
Retired	1
