= Benny Shoaff =

American racing driver (1897–1960)

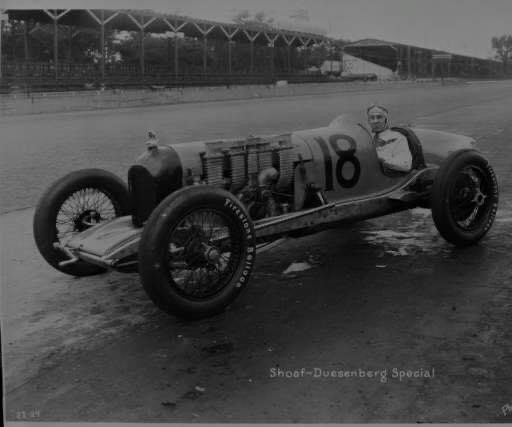
- Born: Thomas Benton Shoaff; February 27, 1897 Paris, Illinois, U.S.
- Died: April 15, 1960 (aged 63) Mattoon, Illinois, U.S.

Champ Car career
- 2 races run over 2 years
- First race: 1927 Indianapolis 500 (Indianapolis)
- Last race: 1928 Indianapolis 500 (Indianapolis)
Wins	Podiums	Poles
0	0	0

Thomas Benton "Benny" Shoaff (February 27, 1897 – April 15, 1960) was an American racing driver.

== Biography ==
Shoaff was born on February 27, 1897, in Paris, Illinois. He died on April 15, 1960.

== Motorsports career results ==
=== Indianapolis 500 results ===
Year	Car	Start	Qual	Rank	Finish	Laps	Led	Retired
1927	24	31	110.152	13	13	198	0	Rear end gears
1928	18	26	102.409	24	26	35	0	Crash T1
Totals						233	0	

Starts	2
Poles	0
Front Row	0
Wins	0
Top 5	0
Top 10	0
Retired	2
