= Clarence Belt =

American racing driver (1890–1969)

- Born: Clarence William Belt; February 27, 1890 Xenia, Ohio, U.S.
- Died: September 15, 1969 (aged 79) Moraine, Ohio, U.S.

Champ Car career
- 1 race run over 3 years
- First race: 1928 Indianapolis 500 (Indianapolis)
Wins	Podiums	Poles
0	0	0

Clarence William Belt (February 27, 1890 – September 15, 1969) was an American racing driver. He failed to qualify for the 1925 Indianapolis 500 but qualified for the 1928 race. In 1927 he attempted two other Championship Car races but failed to qualify for both of them.

Belt has the distinction of becoming the first driver ever to qualify a V-type engine at Indianapolis.

== Motorsports career results ==
=== Indianapolis 500 results ===
Year	Car	Start	Qual	Rank	Finish	Laps	Led	Retired
1928	41	25	96.026	28	27	32	0	Valve
Totals						32	0	

Starts	1
Poles	0
Front Row	0
Wins	0
Top 5	0
Top 10	0
Retired	1
