= Louis Meyer =

American racing driver (1904–1995)

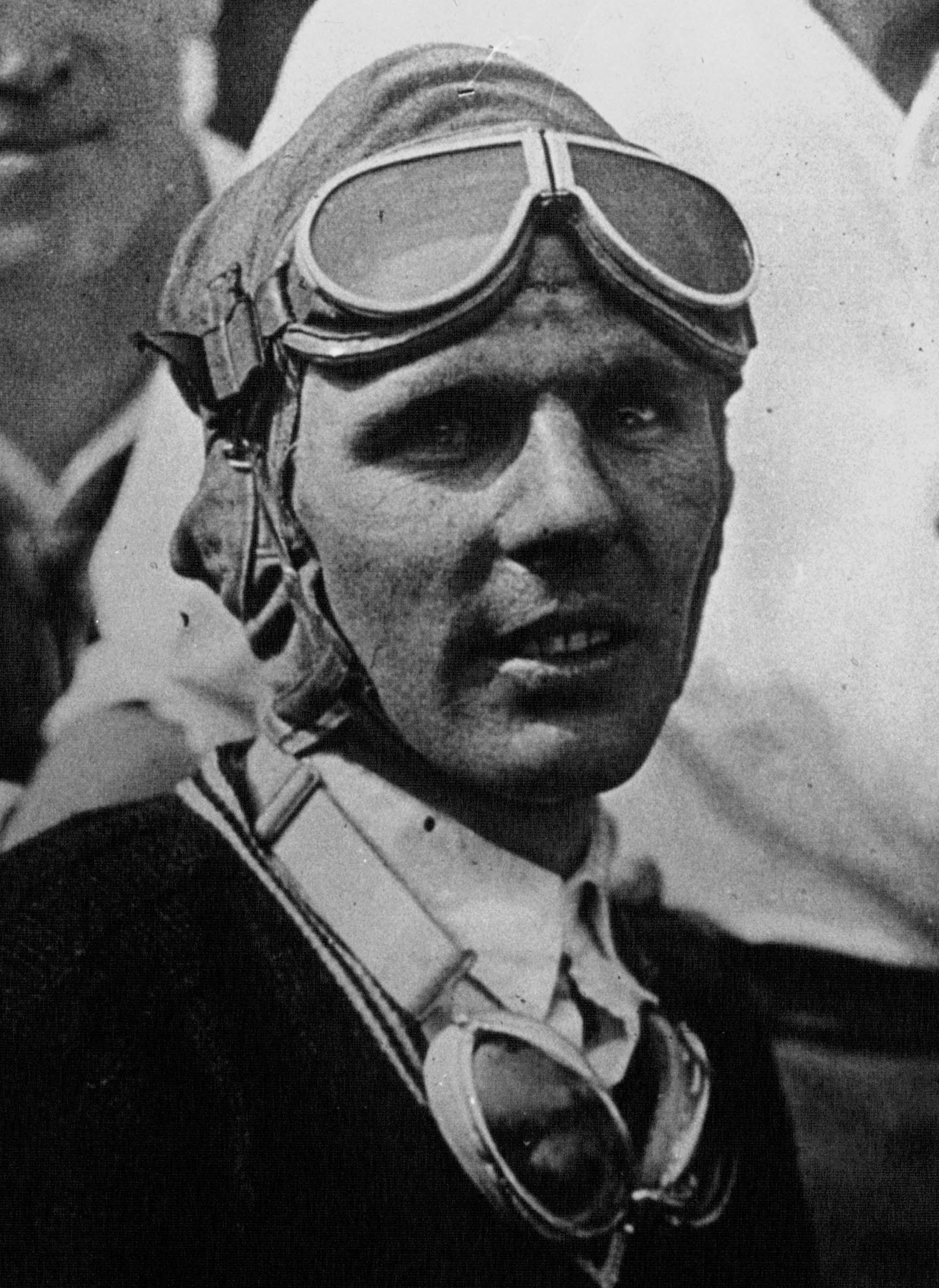
- Meyer in 1928
- Born: July 21, 1904 Yonkers, New York, U.S.
- Died: October 7, 1995 (aged 91) Searchlight, Nevada, U.S.

Championship titles
- AAA Championship Car (1928, 1929, 1933); Major victories Indianapolis 500 (1928, 1933, 1936)

Champ Car career
- 33 races run over 14 years
- Best finish: 1st (1928, 1929, 1933)
- First race: 1926 50-mile Semi-Final (Charlotte)
- Last race: 1939 Indianapolis 500 (Indianapolis)
- First win: 1928 Indianapolis 500 (Indianapolis)
- Last win: 1936 Indianapolis 500 (Indianapolis)
Wins	Podiums	Poles
8	11	0

Louis Meyer (July 21, 1904 – October 7, 1995) was an American racing driver who was the first three-time winner of the Indianapolis 500. He is generally regarded as one of the finest racers of his generation. Meyer is perhaps best known as the driver who started the tradition of drinking milk after winning the Indianapolis 500.

== Early life and career ==
Meyer was born in Yonkers, New York on July 21, 1904, the son of French immigrants. Meyer was raised in Los Angeles, where he began automobile racing at various California tracks.

Early in his career, Meyer helped prepare the Miller driven by Frank Elliott in 1926, destroking the engine to bring it within the 91 1/2 cu in (1,499 cc) displacement limit permitted by the rules. Meyer went with the car when it was sold in 1927 to Fred Holliday (of Holliday Steel Company) as the Jynx Special (a morbidly ironic name, since Jimmy Murphy had been killed in it in 1924). He would be mechanic for Wilbur Shaw in the Indianapolis 500 that year. Meyer also served as co-driver, taking the car from seventh place up to sixth.

== Driving career ==
In 1928, Phil Shafer's intended Miller entry went up for sale, and Alden Sampson bought the car for Meyer. Meyer passed the rookie test, qualified thirteenth, and took the lead on Lap 181; he won by a margin of 25 seconds, at an average speed of 99.5 mph (160.1 km/h). The same year, Meyer won a 200 mi (320 km) event at the 1 1/2 mi (2.4 km) board track at Altoona, Pennsylvania, at an average speed of 117.02 mph (188.33 km/h), in a Stutz-Miller. He earned consistent points finishes to make him AAA's National Champion. He would claim the title again in 1929 and 1933.

At the 1929 Indianapolis 500, Ray Keech beat Meyer, only to be killed at Altoona two weeks later, the season's second 200 mi (320 km) event there, which Meyer won, averaging 110 mph (180 km/h).

Meyer managed only fourth place at the 1930 Indianapolis 500, and the Great Depression curtailed racing. That, plus the closure of many board tracks as unsafe, led Meyer to concentrate more on dirt track racing.

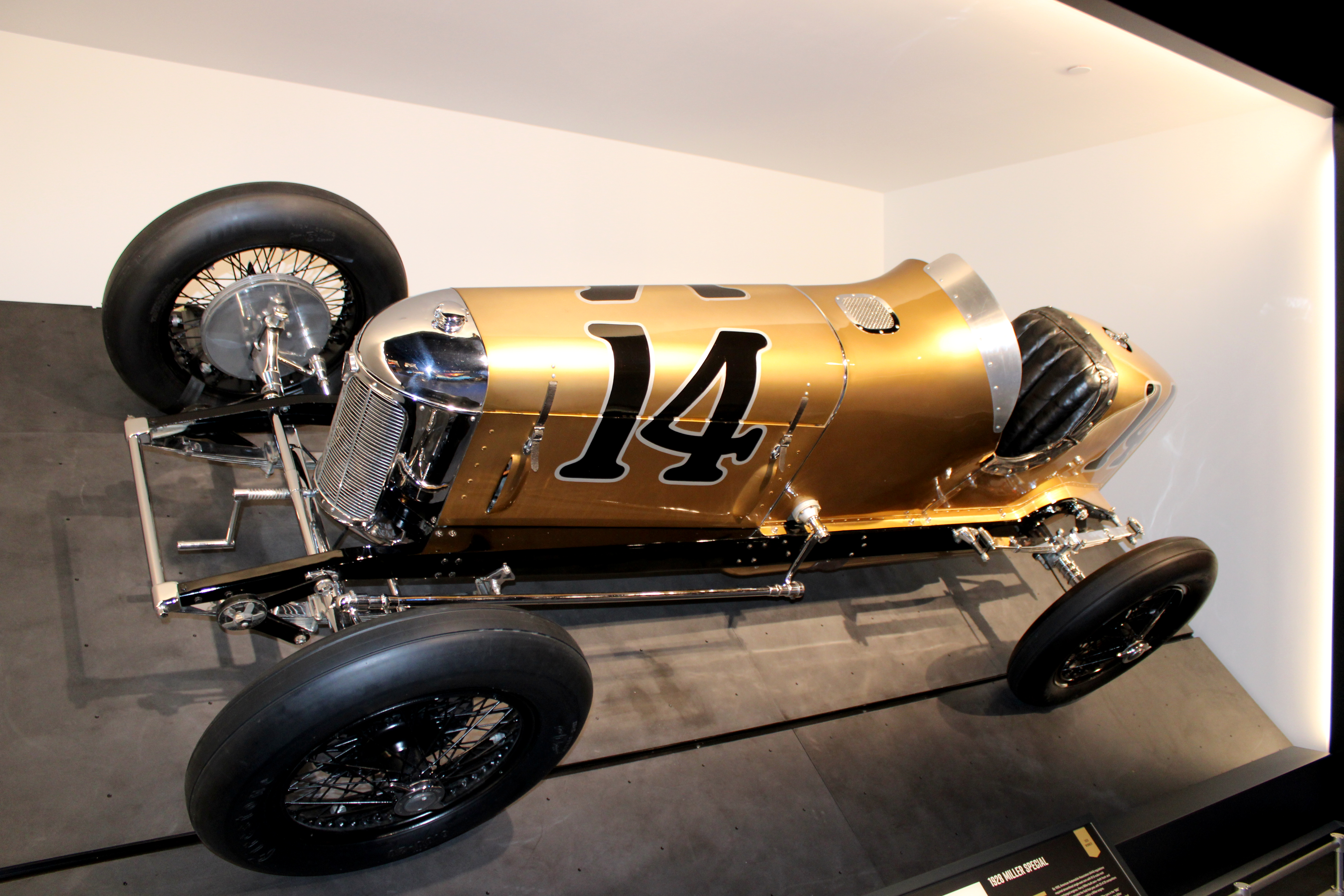
Meyer's winning car from the 1928 Indianapolis 500

In 1933's 500, at the wheel of the Tydol Special Miller, Meyer took the lead on Lap 129. Meyer steadily increased his lead from there, until he was fully four laps up on the field by the checkered flag. Despite lifting later in the race, Meyer's race average, 104.16 mph (167.63 km/h), was still a record. By winning his second 500, he joined a fairly exclusive club. Meyer started the tradition of drinking milk (buttermilk at the time) in victory lane that year, when he drank a glass. Following his 1936 victory, he drank from a glass milk bottle instead, as most race winners have done since.

Meyer followed his success in 1935, forming Champion Drivers, Inc., to promote racing, along with nine other top racers.

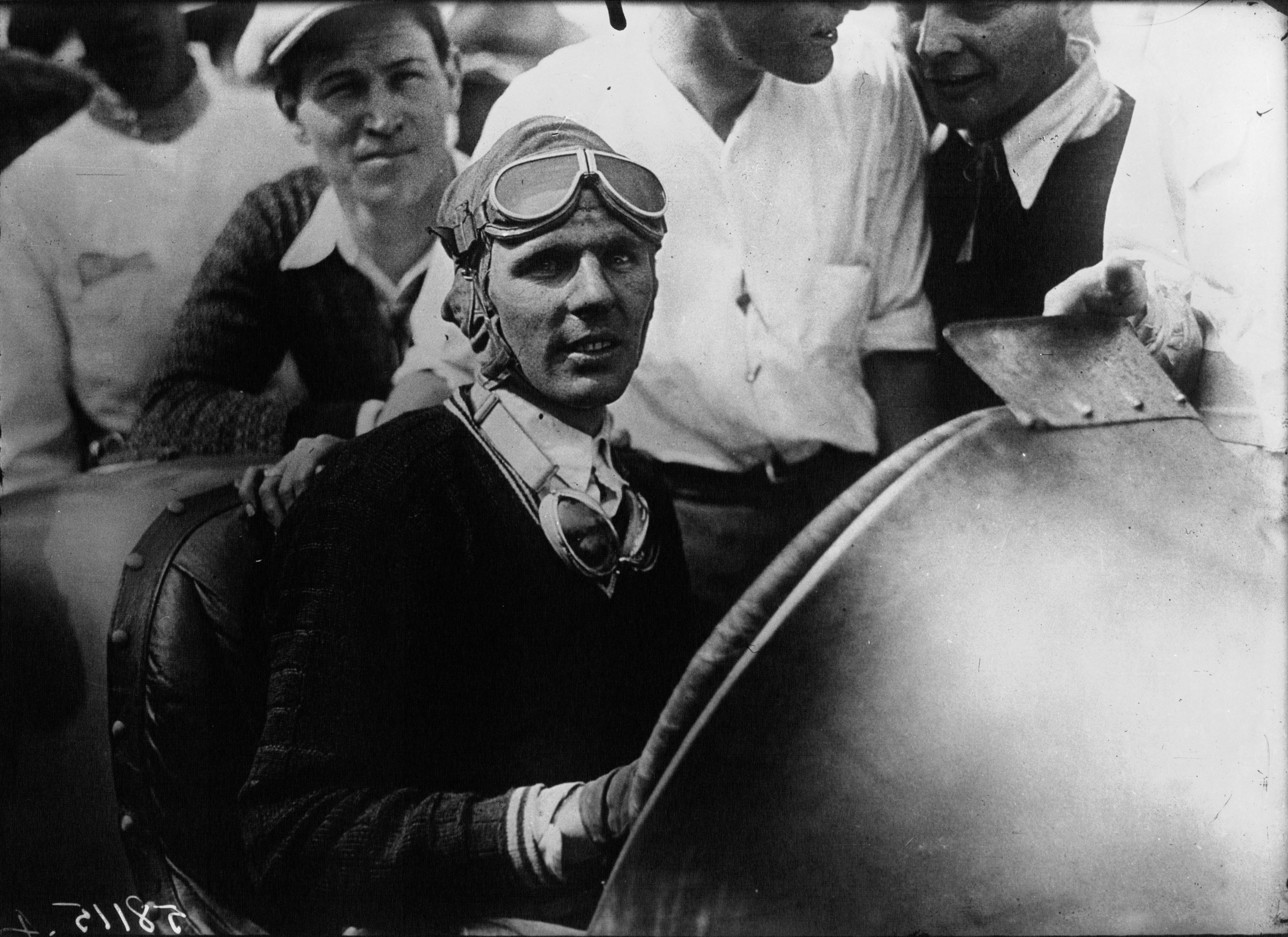
Meyer in victory lane after winning the 1928 Indianapolis 500

Meyer had a successful 1936 season, winning at Altoona, placing second at the difficult Ascot track, and winning his third Indianapolis 500 (in the Ring Free Special Miller, at an average speed of 109.1 mph (175.6 km/h).

Following the suggestion of former race winner, Tommy Milton, that year, Meyer became the first driver to receive the Pace Car as part of the race winnings.

Meyer came close to winning a (then-record) fourth 500 in 1939, in the Bowes Seal Fast Special Miller. Battling Shaw with just four laps to go, Meyer lost control and spun; while unhurt, Meyer's race was lost. He sold the Miller to Rex Mays the next year, going back to becoming a mechanic—or, rather an engine builder: he went into partnership with Dale Drake, taking over Offenhauser's engine plant. Meyer-Drake Offys would dominate Indianapolis for most of the next two decades, powering every winner until 1968.

== Post-driving career ==
Meyer joined Ford in 1964, and through worked on development of the Ford V8, which powered four 500 winners in that time.

Meyer's wife June did not even know he was racing in the 1928 Indianapolis 500. Earlier in the day she was in Pennsylvania picking up a wrecked car and after that went to see her brother-in-law Eddie Meyer race in Reading. She found out about her husband's victory after the track announcer in Reading asked the crowd to give a big hand to Eddie Meyer, the brother of the Indianapolis 500 winner.

== Death and legacy ==
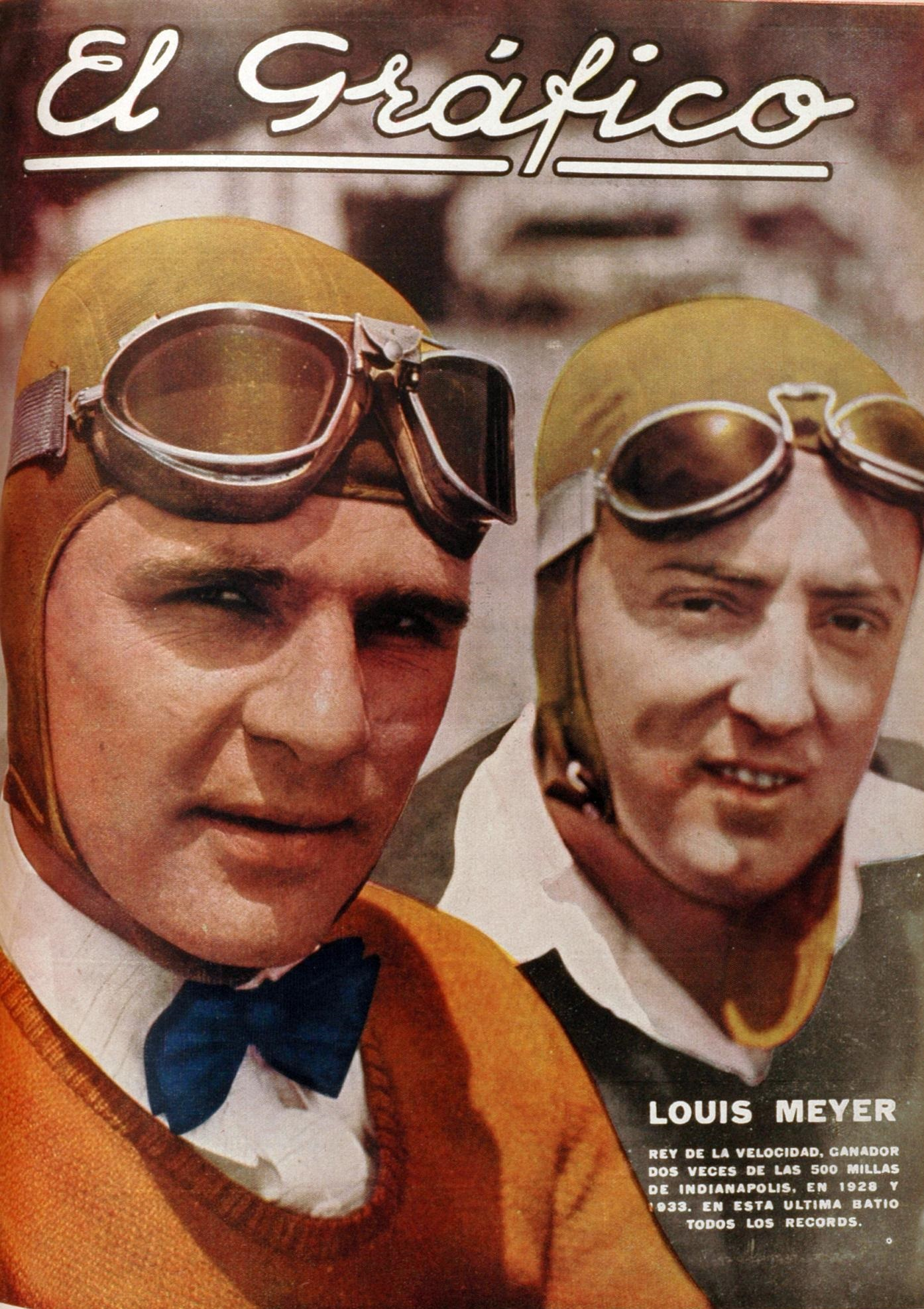
Meyer with riding mechanic Lawson Harris on the cover of El Gráfico magazine, 1933

Meyer died on October 7, 1995, in Searchlight, Nevada, aged 91, where he had been living in retirement since 1972. He was interred at Inglewood Park Cemetery in Inglewood, California.

Meyer's son Louis Sonny Meyer Jr. assisted him in engine work at his race shops, and worked on the various DOHC Ford engines in USAC racing, including building 15 Indianapolis 500-winning engines. Grandson Louis III "Butch" built Oldsmobile Aurora engines for Team Menard in Indy Racing League IndyCar Series competition, winning the 1996-97 (18-month season) and 1999 championships before becoming the Indy Pro Series (now Indy Lights) director. Great-grandson Louis Michael Meyer currently owns and operates Legacy Autosport. The team builds the Legacy chassis for the USAC Silver Crown series and fields cars as well. And in 2023 became the first non-Beast chassis to win a pavement Crown race since 2008 when Davey Hamilton, Jr. won at Worldwide Technology Raceway.

== Awards and honors ==
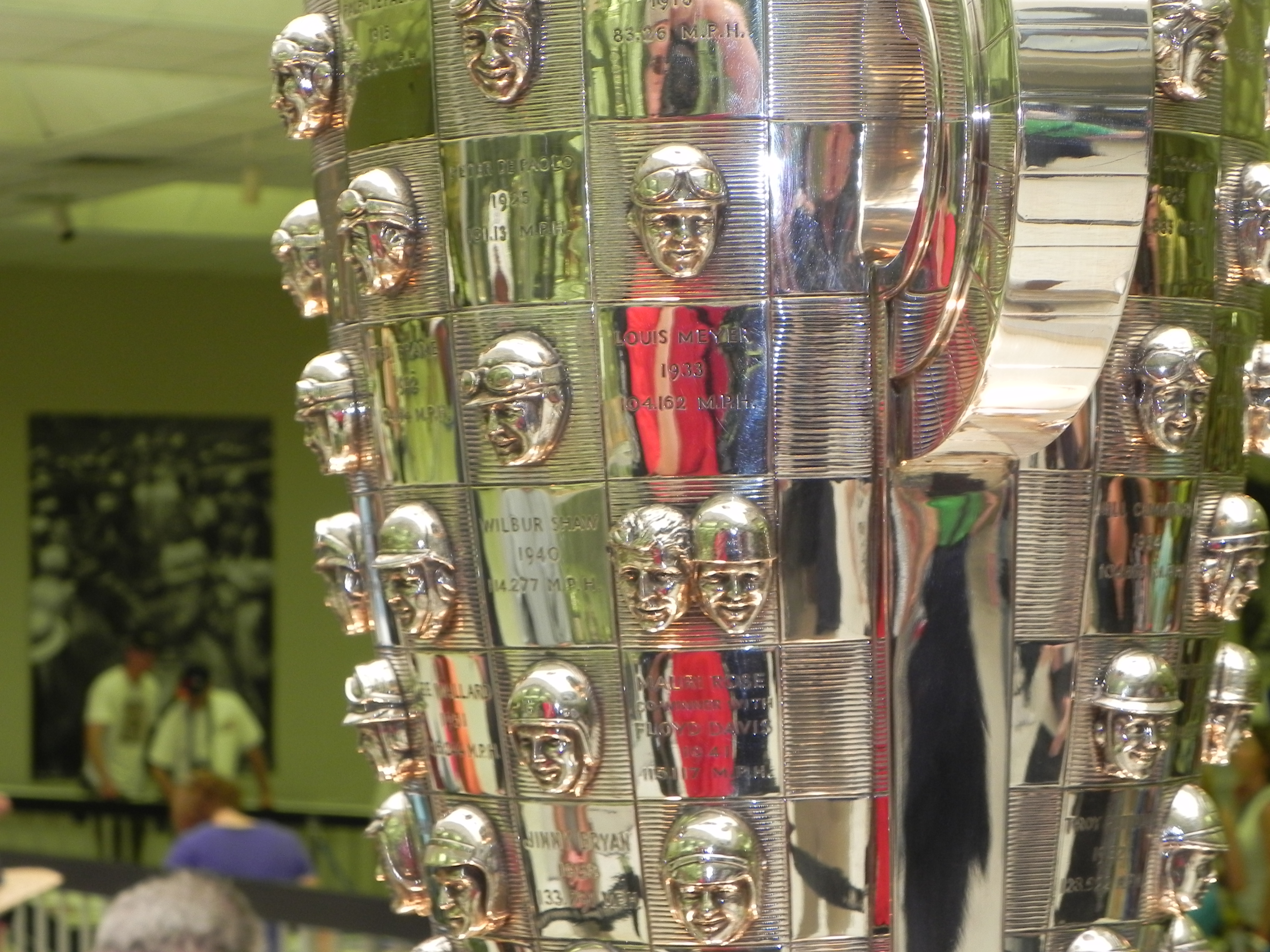
Meyer's name and likeness among the winners memorialized upon the Borg-Warner Trophy - Meyer was the inaugural awardee of the trophy in 1936

Meyer has been inducted into the following halls of fame:

- Auto Racing Hall of Fame (1963)
- International Motorsports Hall of Fame (1992)
- Motorsports Hall of Fame of America (1993)

== Motorsports career results ==
=== Indianapolis 500 Results ===
Year	Car	Start	Qual	Rank	Finish	Laps	Led	Retired
1928	14	13	111.352	17	1	200	19	Running
1929	1	8	114.704	9	2	200	65	Running
1930	1	2	111.290	2	4	200	2	Running
1931	7	25	113.522	2	34	28	0	Oil leak
1932	16	7	112.471	12	33	50	0	Crankshaft
1933	36	6	116.977	7	1	200	71	Running
1934	1	13	112.332	20	18	92	0	Oil tank
1935	36	4	117.938	5	12	200	0	Running
1936	8	28	114.171	18	1	200	96	Running
1937	2	5	119.619	12	4	200	0	Running
1938	5	12	120.525	16	16	149	0	Oil pump
1939	45	2	130.067	2	12	197	79	Crash BS
Totals						1916	332	

Starts	12
Poles	0
Front Row	2
Wins	3
Top 5	6
Top 10	6
Retired	5

== Sources ==
- Wise, David Burgess. "Meyer: The first triple Indy winner", in Ward, Ian, executive editor. World of Automobiles Volume 12, p. 1330. London: Orbis, 1974.

Preceded by George Souders	Indianapolis 500 Winner; 1928	Succeeded by Ray Keech
Preceded by Fred Frame	Indianapolis 500 Winner; 1933	Succeeded by Bill Cummings
Preceded by Kelly Petillo	Indianapolis 500 Winner; 1936	Succeeded by Wilbur Shaw
