= Jimmy Gleason =

American racing driver (1898–1931)

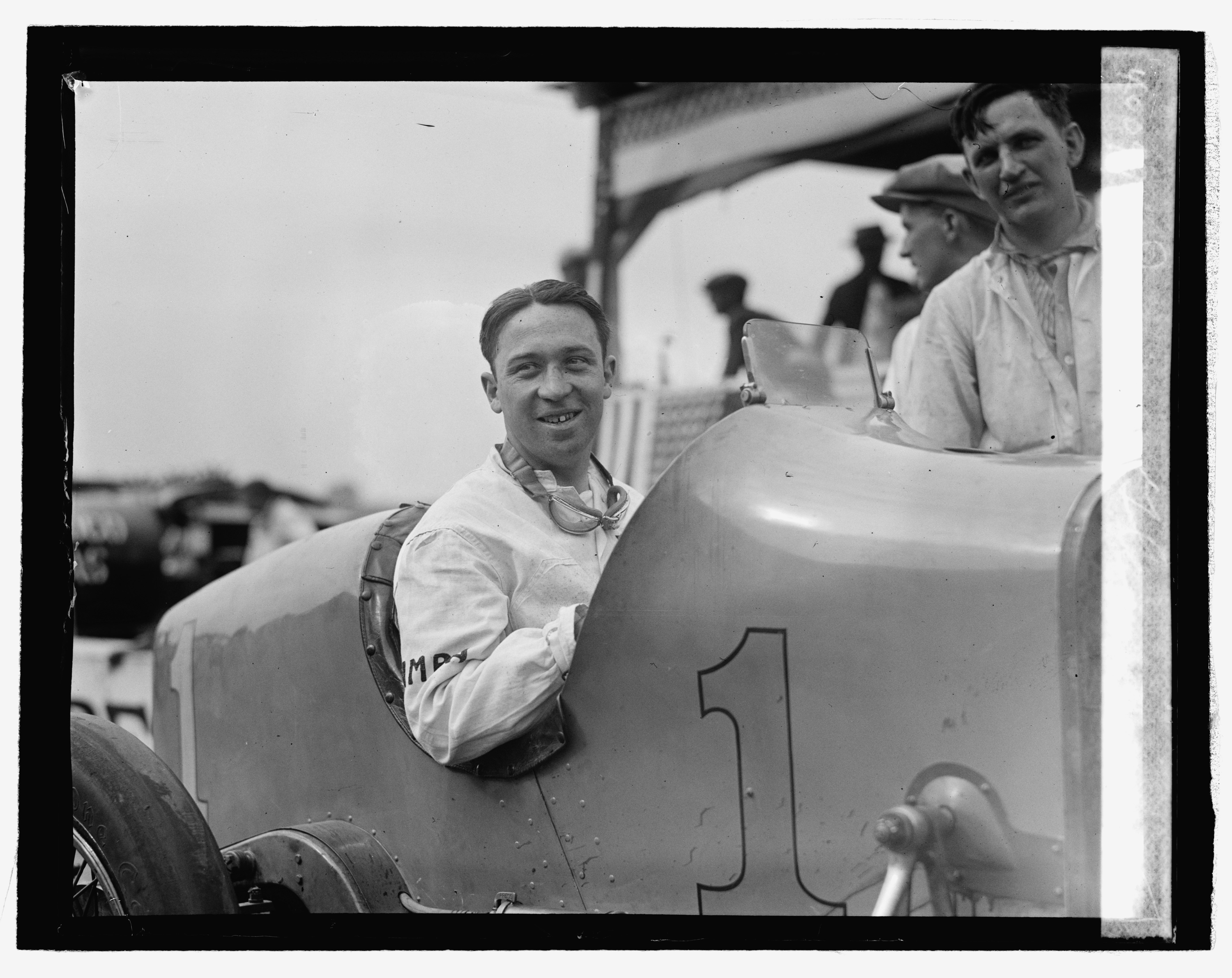
- Born: James Edward Gleason; February 17, 1898 Philadelphia, Pennsylvania, U.S.
- Died: September 12, 1931 (aged 33) Syracuse, New York, U.S.

Champ Car career
- 14 races run over 4 years
- Best finish: 5th (1931)
- First race: 1928 Indianapolis 500 (Indianapolis)
- Last race: 1931 25-mile Heat (Altoona)
- First win: 1931 25-mile Heat (Altoona)
Wins	Podiums	Poles
1	3	0

James Edward Gleason (February 17, 1898 – September 12, 1931) was an American racing driver. He was killed while qualifying for a AAA-sanctioned National Championship race at Syracuse, less than a week after he had captured his first Championship Car victory at Altoona.

== Motorsports career results ==
=== Indianapolis 500 results ===
Year	Car	Start	Qual	Rank	Finish	Laps	Led	Retired
1928	39	21	111.708	13	15	195	43	Magneto
1929	53	23	110.345	21	3	200	0	Running
1930	7	24	93.709	30	28	22	0	Timing gears
1931	33	20	111.400	8	6	200	0	Running
Totals						617	43	

Starts	4
Poles	0
Front Row	0
Wins	0
Top 5	1
Top 10	2
Retired	2
