= Al Melcher =

American racing driver (1884–1944)

- Born: Alfred Amos Melcher; September 3, 1884 Dalton City, Illinois, U.S.
- Died: October 28, 1944 (aged 60) Los Angeles, California, U.S.

Champ Car career
- 18 races run over 6 years
- Best finish: 12th (1927)
- First race: 1919 Santa Monica Race (Santa Monica)
- Last race: 1927 75-mile Race (Rockingham Park)
Wins	Podiums	Poles
0	1	1

Alfred Amos Melcher (September 3, 1884 – October 28, 1944) was an American racing driver.

== Racing career ==
Melcher competed in 18 AAA Championship Car races from 1919 to 1927. He competed nearly full-time on the board tracks in 1927 and made his only Indianapolis 500 start that year as well. He finished 12th in points with a best finish of second on the 1.5-mile Atlantic City Speedway board oval.

== Motorsports career results ==
=== Indianapolis 500 results ===
Year	Car	Start	Qual	Rank	Finish	Laps	Led	Retired
1927	44	20	102.918	33	15	144	0	Supercharger
Totals						144	0	

Starts	1
Poles	0
Front Row	0
Wins	0
Top 5	0
Top 10	0
Retired	1
