= Babe Stapp =

American racing driver (1904–1980)

- Born: Elbert Achilles Stapp; February 26, 1904 San Antonio, Texas, U.S.
- Died: September 17, 1980 (aged 76) Indianapolis, Indiana, U.S.

Championship titles
- AAA Midwest Big Car (1935)

Champ Car career
- 38 races run over 14 years
- Best finish: 4th (tie) (1939)
- First race: 1927 Indianapolis 500 (Indianapolis)
- Last race: 1940 Indianapolis 500 (Indianapolis)
- First win: 1927 Charlotte 100 (Charlotte)
- Last win: 1939 Milwaukee 100 (Milwaukee)
Wins	Podiums	Poles
2	4	0

Elbert Achilles "Babe" Stapp (February 26, 1904 – September 17, 1980) was an American racing driver active in the 1920s and 1930s. He also was a member of the infamous 13 Black Cats (1924).

== Awards and honors ==
- Stapp was inducted in the National Sprint Car Hall of Fame in 1994.

== Motorsports career results ==
=== Indianapolis 500 results ===
Year	Car	Start	Qual	Rank	Finish	Laps	Led	Retired
1927	38	24	109.555	18	31	24	0	Universal joint
1928	7	5	116.887	5	6	200	17	Running
1929	32	4	115.618	4	28	40	0	Universal joint
1930	8	32	104.950	10	31	18	0	Crash T3
1931	39	6	110.125	12	35	9	0	Oil leak/clutch
1933	45	29	116.626	9	23	156	60	Out of gas
1935	17	12	116.736	8	25	70	4	Radiator
1936	21	2	118.945	2	24	89	25	Crankshaft
1937	15	31	117.226	29	31	36	0	Clutch
1938	34	8	120.595	15	26	54	0	Valve
1939	31	16	125.000	12	5	200	0	Running
1940	24	12	123.367	11	24	64	0	Oil line
Totals						960	106	

Starts	12
Poles	0
Front Row	1
Wins	0
Top 5	1
Top 10	2
Retired	10

- Stapp's finishes from 1927 – 1938 rank as the worst ten-race finishing streak in Indianapolis 500 history.
