= Fred Lecklider =

American racing driver (1895–1964)

- Born: Frederick Floyd Lecklider; June 9, 1895 Toledo, Ohio, U.S.
- Died: January 10, 1964 (aged 68) Los Angeles, California, U.S.

Champ Car career
- 6 races run over 2 years
- Best finish: 32nd (1930)
- First race: 1926 Indianapolis 500 (Indianapolis)
- Last race: 1927 Altoona 200 #2 (Altoona)
Wins	Podiums	Poles
0	0	0

Frederick Floyd Lecklider (June 9, 1895 – January 10, 1964) was an American racing driver. Lecklider made six AAA Championship Car starts in 1926 and 1927 including the Indianapolis 500 both of those years. His best finish was sixth on a pair of board ovals in 1927. He returned to Indianapolis in 1930 to drive in relief for Leslie Allen.

== Motorsports career results ==
=== Indianapolis 500 results ===
Year	Car	Start	Qual	Rank	Finish	Laps	Led	Retired
1926	17	26	100.398	17	24	24	0	Rod
1927	23	30	105.729	30	23	49	0	Crash T1
Totals						73	0	

Starts	2
Poles	0
Front Row	0
Wins	0
Top 5	0
Top 10	0
Retired	2
