= Fred Comer =

American racing driver (1893–1928)

- Born: Fred Griffitt Comer; February 19, 1893 Topeka, Kansas, U.S.
- Died: October 12, 1928 (aged 35) Lawrence, Massachusetts, U.S.

Champ Car career
- 48 races run over 6 years
- Best finish: 5th (1924)
- First race: 1923 Altoona 200 (Altoona)
- Last race: 1928 International Motor Classic (Rockingham Park)
- First win: 1926 Sesquicentennial Classic; Semi-Final (Atlantic City)
Wins	Podiums	Poles
1	8	1

Fred Griffitt Comer (February 19, 1893 – October 12, 1928) was an American racing driver. Like many American racers of his era, he was a board track racing specialist and made 43 AAA Championship Car starts on board ovals, with one win in 1926 on the Atlantic City track, and one pole. He also made four starts in the Indianapolis 500 with a best finish of fourth place in 1926. He finished a career best fifth in 1924 AAA National Championship points. Comer died from injuries sustained in a racing accident at Rockingham Park board track in New Hampshire.

== Motorsports career results ==
=== Indianapolis 500 results ===
Year	Car	Start	Qual	Rank	Finish	Laps	Led	Retired
1924	14	16	92.880	17	7	200	0	Running
1925	5	12	104.296	14	11	200	0	Running
1926	8	13	100.612	16	4	155	0	Flagged
1928	25	9	113.690	9	9	200	0	Running
Totals						755	0	

Starts	4
Poles	0
Front Row	0
Wins	0
Top 5	1
Top 10	3
Retired	0
