= Sam Ross =

American racing driver (1901–1980)

- Born: Samuel B. Ross; June 6, 1901 Ann Arbor, Michigan, U.S.
- Died: September 12, 1980 (aged 79) Northfield, Michigan, U.S.

Champ Car career
- 11 races run over 4 years
- Best finish: 11th (1931)
- First race: 1928 Indianapolis 500 (Indianapolis)
- Last race: 1932 Detroit 100 #2 (Detroit)
| Wins | Podiums | Poles |
|---|---|---|
| 0 | 1 | 0 |

Samuel B. Ross (June 6, 1901 – September 12, 1980) was an American racing driver.

== Motorsports career results ==
=== Indianapolis 500 results ===
| Year | Car | Start | Qual | Rank | Finish | Laps | Led | Retired |
|---|---|---|---|---|---|---|---|---|
| 1928 | 38 | 16 | 106.572 | 22 | 20 | 132 | 0 | Timing gears |
| 1931 | 59 | 37 | 104.642 | 30 | 15 | 200 | 0 | Running |
| Totals | | | | | | 332 | 0 | |

| Starts | 2 |
| Poles | 0 |
| Front Row | 0 |
| Wins | 0 |
| Top 5 | 0 |
| Top 10 | 0 |
| Retired | 1 |
