= Jack Petticord =

American racing driver (1900–1940)

- Born: Harold Homer Petticord; November 21, 1900 Wichita, Kansas, U.S.
- Died: January 2, 1940 (aged 39) Chicago, Illinois, U.S.

Champ Car career
- 1 race run over 3 years
- First race: 1927 Indianapolis 500 (Indianapolis)
Wins	Podiums	Poles
0	0	0

Harold Homer "Jack" Petticord (November 21, 1900 – January 2, 1940) was an American racing driver.

== Racing career ==
Petticord drove for the Essex racing team in 1922 and 1923, as well as for the Boyle Valve racing team in 1927. Primarily a dirt track racer, Petticord made starts in both IMCA Big Cars and AAA Championship Car including the 1927 Indianapolis 500. He also served as a relief driver later in that race for Al Melcher, and then the next year, was a relief driver for Ira Hall. In 1934, he again attempted to qualify for the Indianapolis 500 but failed to do so. He failed to qualify in 1938 as well. He died in Chicago, Illinois and is buried in Highland Cemetery in Wichita, Kansas.

== Motorsports career results ==
=== Indianapolis 500 results ===
Year	Car	Start	Qual	Rank	Finish	Laps	Led	Retired
1927	22	11	109.920	14	32	22	0	Supercharger
Totals						22	0	

Starts	1
Poles	0
Front Row	0
Wins	0
Top 5	0
Top 10	0
Retired	1
