= George Fernic =

Romanian engineer (1900–1930)

- Born: Gheorghe Fernic; 5 August 1900 Galați, Western Moldavia, Romania
- Died: 29 August 1930 (aged 30) Chicago, Illinois, U.S.

George Fernic (born Gheorghe Fernic, 5 August 1900 – 29 August 1930) was a Romanian pilot, aircraft engineer, inventor, and amateur racing driver.

== Biography ==
Fernic became passionate about aviation during the First World War years, having a military airfield in his vicinity. In 1916 he received his diploma as an aerial photo-observer and later in 1916–17 he was part of the squadron of the 3rd Aeronautic Group.

== Indianapolis 500 ==
In 1927, Fernic attempted to qualify for the Indianapolis 500. Driving a Bugatti, he failed to make the field. During the race, he drove relief for the Miller car #31. He drove 182 laps in the car, qualified by Fred Frame. Fernic finished the race one lap behind the winner, George Souders.

== FT-9 & FT-10 ==
After the FT-9, a year later, in 1930, the FT-10 came out of the factory, a slightly smaller plane, ideal for school and tourism, but also for mass production.

== Death ==
On 29 August 1930, Fernic participated in an air demonstration, held at Curtiss-Reynolds Airport in Chicago, in the presence of 40,000 spectators. His self-built T.10, also designated FT-10, Cruisaire, lost power after one of the engine cylinders exploded and pieces of metal thrown by the explosion injured the pilot. The plane crashed into another parked plane and Fernic lost his life in the crash. Romania realized what it had lost and established the "Virtutea Aeronautică" Order, to reward those with special merits in the field, and patent number 1 was awarded, posthumously, to Fernic.

The characteristics of Fernic's plane were as follows:

- Wingspan: 7.62 m
- Wing area: 36.56 m²
- Own weight: 397 kg
- Weight ready to fly: 600 kg
- Maximum speed: 136 km/h
- Engine: 75 HP Michigan Rover
