= Dave Evans (racing driver) =

American racing driver (1898–1974)

- Born: David Sloat; August 31, 1898 Los Angeles, California, U.S.
- Died: March 31, 1974 (aged 75) Dillon, Montana, U.S.

Champ Car career
- 36 races run over 12 years
- Best finish: 6th (1933)
- First race: 1925 Charlotte 250 (Charlotte)
- Last race: 1936 Vanderbilt Cup (Westbury)
Wins	Podiums	Poles
0	2	0

Dave Evans (born David Sloat, August 31, 1898 – March 31, 1974) was an American racing driver.

Evans was born in Los Angeles, California. In 1931, he performed a remarkable feat when his Cummins Diesel Special completed the entire Indianapolis 500 without a pit stop. He died in Dillon, Montana, aged 75.

== Motorsports career results ==
=== Indianapolis 500 results ===
Year	Car	Start	Qual	Rank	Finish	Laps	Led	Retired
1927	21	28	107.360	25	5	200	0	Running
1928	12	23	108.264	19	12	200	0	Running
1930	24	33	97.342	24	6	200	0	Running
1931	8	17	96.871	40	13	200	0	Running
1933	38	36	109.448	36	6	200	0	Running
1934	6	22	102.414	33	19	81	0	Transmission
Totals						1081	0	

Starts	6
Poles	0
Front Row	0
Wins	0
Top 5	1
Top 10	3
Retired	1
