= W. E. Shattuc =

American racing driver (1894–1962)

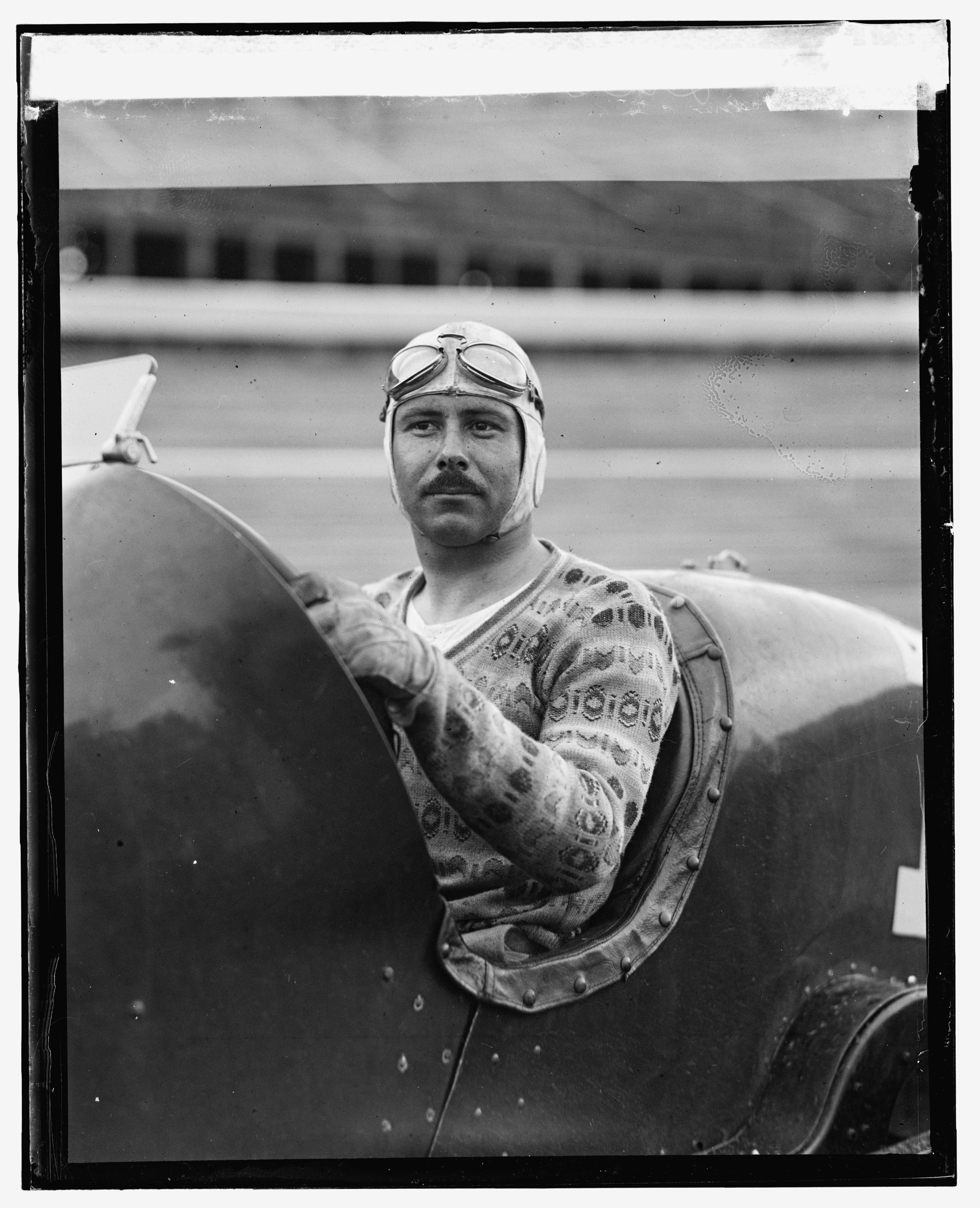
- Born: William Ellison Shattuc; November 18, 1894 Madisonville, Ohio, U.S.
- Died: October 26, 1962 (aged 67) Lubbock, Texas, U.S.

Champ Car career
- 35 races run over 4 years
- Best finish: 14th (1924)
- First race: 1924 Culver City 250 (Culver City)
- Last race: 1927 65-mile Race (Rockingham Park)
Wins	Podiums	Poles
0	2	0

William Ellison Shattuc (November 18, 1894 – October 26, 1962) was an American racing driver. He was also a practicing pulmonary physician in Louisville, Kentucky earned him the nickname "Doc". Shattuc was the grandson of William Bunn Shattuc, a former Congressman from Ohio.

== Motorsports career results ==
=== Indianapolis 500 results ===
Year	Car	Start	Qual	Rank	Finish	Laps	Led	Retired
1925	15	14	102.070	17	9	200	0	Running
1926	22	10	104.977	11	27	15	0	Valve
1927	17	16	107.060	26	22	83	0	Valve
Totals						298	0	

Starts	3
Poles	0
Front Row	0
Wins	0
Top 5	0
Top 10	1
Retired	2
