= Jim Hill (racing driver) =

American racing driver (1888–1962)

- Born: Jim R. Hill; September 8, 1888 Vernon, Indiana, U.S.
- Died: October 21, 1962 (aged 74) Indianapolis, Indiana, U.S.

Champ Car career
- 6 races run over 6 years
- Best finish: 20th (tie) (1925)
- First race: 1915 Galesburg 100 (Galesburg)
- Last race: 1927 Indianapolis 500 (Indianapolis)
| Wins | Podiums | Poles |
|---|---|---|
| 0 | 0 | 0 |

Jim R. Hill (September 8, 1888 – October 21, 1962) was an American racing driver.

== Motorsports career results ==
=== AAA Championship car ===
| Season | Class | Team | Race | Win | Podium | Pole | FLap | Pts | Plcd |
|---|---|---|---|---|---|---|---|---|---|
| 1925 | AAA National Championship | R.J. | 4 | 0 | 0 | 0 | 0 | 40 | 20th |
| 1927 | AAA National Championship | Earl Devore | 1 | 0 | 0 | 0 | 0 | 0 | NC |

=== Indianapolis 500 results ===
| Year | Car | Start | Qual | Rank | Finish | Laps | Led | Retired |
|---|---|---|---|---|---|---|---|---|
| 1927 | 42 | 32 | 107.392 | 24 | 12 | 197 | 0 | Flagged |

| Starts | 1 |
| Poles | 0 |
| Front Row | 0 |
| Wins | 0 |
| Top 5 | 0 |
| Top 10 | 0 |
| Retired | 0 |
