= Norman Batten =

American racing driver (1893–1928)

- Born: Norman Kirkpatrick Batten; April 30, 1893 East Orange, New Jersey, U.S.
- Died: November 12, 1928 (aged 35) 200 miles off the coast of Hampton Roads, Virginia, U.S.

Champ Car career
- 29 races run over 5 years
- Best finish: 7th (1928)
- First race: 1924 Syracuse 150 (Syracuse)
- Last race: 1928 International Motor Classic (Rockingham Park)
- First win: 1926 Sesquicentennial Classic; Heat #2 (Atlantic City)
Wins	Podiums	Poles
1	4	1

Norman Kirkpatrick Batten (April 30, 1893 – November 12, 1928) was an American racing driver active in the 1920s. Batten provided relief for Peter DePaolo in the 1925 Indianapolis 500, before his rookie year of 1926. He died and his body, along with fellow driver Earl Devore, were lost at sea after the sinking of the ocean liner SS Vestris.

On January 9, 1918, in Juliustown, New Jersey, Batten married Marion Calvin, daughter of Willian John Calvin and Harriet Dimond Kennedy. She was a registered nurse. His wife survived the sinking of the Vestris.

== Motorsports career results ==
=== Indianapolis 500 results ===
Year	Car	Start	Qual	Rank	Finish	Laps	Led	Retired
1925	Participated as a relief driver							
1926	14	16	101.428	15	7	151	0	Flagged
1927	8	10	111.940	11	30	24	0	Caught fire
1928	22	15	106.585	21	5	200	0	Running
Totals						375	0	

Starts	3
Poles	0
Front Row	0
Wins	0
Top 5	1
Top 10	2
Retired	1

- In 1925, Batten drove 21 laps of relief for race winner Pete DePaolo.
