= Tony Gulotta =

American racing driver (1903–1981)

- Gulotta (left) with W. W. Brown
- Born: Anthony Gulotta; August 4, 1903 Donaldsonville, Louisiana, U.S.
- Died: March 2, 1981 (aged 77) Los Angeles, California, U.S.

Champ Car career
- 27 races run over 14 years
- Best finish: 8th (1927, 1933)
- First race: 1926 Indianapolis 500 (Indianapolis)
- Last race: 1939 Indianapolis 500 (Indianapolis)
Wins	Podiums	Poles
0	2	0

Anthony Gulotta (August 4, 1903 – March 2, 1981) was an American racing driver active in the 1920s and 1930s.

== Racing career ==
Gulotta competed in American Championship Car Racing and finished eighth in the 1927 National Championship driving a Miller, finishing third in the 1927 Indianapolis 500. After that season primarily focused on the Indianapolis 500. In the 1928 Indianapolis 500, Gulotta was leading less than 18 laps from the finish when his fuel line clogged forcing him to stop for repairs. He ultimately finished tenth. In all, he made thirteen starts in the Indy 500 with a best finish of third in 1927, his second start.

== Motorsports career results ==
=== Indianapolis 500 results ===
Year	Car	Start	Qual	Rank	Finish	Laps	Led	Retired
1926	31	12	102.789	13	11	142	0	Flagged
1927	27	27	107.765	22	3	200	0	Running
1928	8	4	117.031	4	10	200	33	Running
1929	23	11	112.146	15	17	91	0	Supercharger
1930	9	20	100.033	18	20	79	0	Valve
1931	37	19	111.725	6	18	167	0	Crash T4
1932	25	20	108.896	34	13	184	0	Flagged
1933	34	12	113.578	15	7	200	0	Running
1934	8	7	113.733	13	17	94	0	Rod
1935	44	6	115.459	11	21	102	0	Magneto
1937	38	7	118.788	16	8	200	0	Running
1938	17	4	122.499	6	17	130	0	Rod
1939	62	27	121.749	24	11	200	0	Running
Totals						1989	33	

Starts	13
Poles	0
Front Row	0
Wins	0
Top 5	1
Top 10	4
Retired	6
