= Cliff Bergere =

American racing driver (1896–1980)

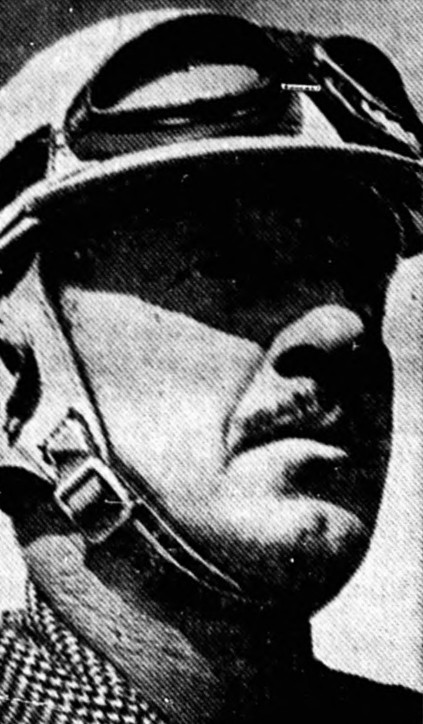
- Bergere, circa 1940
- Born: December 6, 1896 New York, New York, U.S.
- Died: June 18, 1980 (aged 83) Dade City, Florida, U.S.

Champ Car career
- 22 races run over 16 years
- Best finish: 4th (tie) (1939, 1941)
- First race: 1927 Indianapolis 500 (Indianapolis)
- Last race: 1947 Indianapolis 500 (Indianapolis)
Wins	Podiums	Poles
0	3	1

Cliff Bergere (December 6, 1896 – June 18, 1980) was an American stuntman and racing driver.

Bergere did stunt driving for movies, including the 1923 film The Eagle's Talons, before embarking on a racing career. From 1927 to 1947, he started the Indianapolis 500 sixteen times, missing only the 1930 race. He started the race from the front row three times and won the pole position in 1946. At age 49, he became, and to date remains, the oldest pole winner. He finished third in 1932 and 1939 and completed the 1941 race without making a pit stop, finishing fifth.

At the conclusion of his career in 1947, Bergere held the distinction of the most starts in Indianapolis 500 history (16), a record he held for twenty-seven years until surpassed by A.J. Foyt, the current record-holder, in 1974.

== Motorsports career results ==
=== Indianapolis 500 results ===
Year	Car	Start	Qual	Rank	Finish	Laps	Led	Retired
1927	25	14	108.820	19	9	200	0	Running
1928	21	3	119.956	3	28	7	0	Supercharger
1929	25	32	103.687	32	9	200	0	Running
1931	28	14	106.781	23	9	200	0	Running
1932	22	10	111.503	16	3	200	0	Running
1933	6	9	115.643	11	11	200	0	Running
1934	22	18	115.243	8	7	200	0	Running
1935	15	16	114.162	23	13	196	0	Out of gas
1936	42	7	113.377	22	22	116	0	Engine support
1937	45	16	117.546	24	5	200	0	Running
1938	9	32	114.464	32	20	111	0	Piston
1939	54	10	123.835	15	3	200	0	Running
1940	5	6	123.673	10	27	51	0	Oil line
1941	34	7	123.890	13	5	200	10	Running
1946	3	1	126.471	3	16	82	2	Out of oil
1947	18	2	124.957	4	21	62	23	Piston
Totals						2425	35	

Starts	16
Poles	1
Front Row	3
Wins	0
Top 5	4
Top 10	8
Retired	7
