= Wesley Crawford =

American racing driver (1904–1961)

- Born: Wesley Charles Crafford; January 4, 1904 Lake Charles, Louisiana, U.S.
- Died: January 9, 1961 (aged 57) Indianapolis, Indiana, U.S.

Champ Car career
- 4 races run over 7 years
- Best finish: 26th (tie) (1927)
- First race: 1923 Beverly Hills 250 #2 (Beverly Hills)
- Last race: 1933 Indianapolis 500 (Indianapolis)
Wins	Podiums	Poles
0	0	0

Wesley Charles Crafford (January 4, 1904 – January 9, 1961) was an American racing driver. He competed under the surname Crawford.

== Motorsports career results ==
=== Indianapolis 500 results ===
Year	Car	Start	Qual	Rank	Finish	Laps	Led	Retired
1929	49	24	108.607	22	15	127	0	Carburetor
1932	48	16	110.396	28	36	28	0	Crankshaft
1933	32	26	109.862	33	24	147	0	Crash T1
Totals						302	0	

Starts	3
Poles	0
Front Row	0
Wins
Top 5	0
Top 10	0
Retired	3
