= 1928 Grand Prix season =

Grand Prix season

Seasons
- ← 1927 1929 →

The 1928 Grand Prix season saw the Monegasque driver Louis Chiron, and his Bugatti, take seven Grand Prix victories.

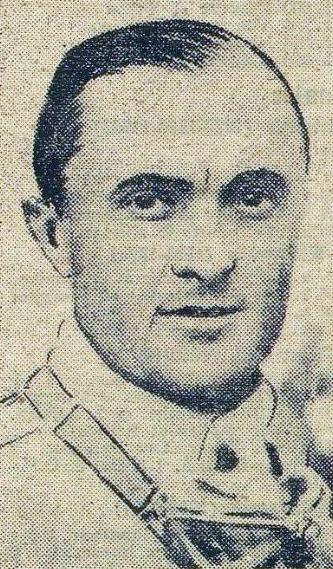
Louis Chiron, top driver of 1928

For 1928, the AIACR abandoned its 1.5-litre formula. Manufacturer interest was low, not helped by the increasing economic downturn. Instead cars would have to be between 550 and 750 kg to an open engine-formula. Originally, the World Manufacturers' Championship was planned on seven national races but as the year went on, five were cancelled and only the Indianapolis 500 and Italian Grand Prix were held. Falling under the mandatory races, the whole championship was cancelled. With the win for Bentley in the 1927 Le Mans and the success of the inaugural Mille Miglia road-race grabbing the public's attention, more races turned to sports- and touring-car racing.

The season is remembered primarily for a deadly accident at the Italian Grand Prix. The Talbot of Emilio Materassi swerved off the road at 200 km/h, rolled a number of times and crashed into the crowd, killing Materassi and 22 other people. The accident was the greatest single loss of life in motor-racing history to that time, and still the second worst to date, after the 1955 Le Mans disaster.

With the open formula, the Bugatti Type 35, and its variants was the dominant car. Talbot, Maserati and Alfa Romeo all had some success, but it was Bugattis that filled the entry-lists across Europe. Albert Divo won the Targa Florio for Bugatti's fourth successive year, after a well-prepared challenge from female Czech driver Eliška Junková. A month earlier, top Italian driver Pietro Bordino was killed in practice for the Alessandria Circuit. The rounds of the Italian Drivers Championship attracted many of the best drivers. A close contest developed between Chiron and Nuvolari (both Bugatti), Materassi (Talbot) and Campari (Alfa Romeo), with Campari taking the title. In the United States, the Indianapolis 500 was won by rookie Louis Meyer in a Miller. He went on to be crowned the season's AAA Champion.

== Grandes Épreuves ==
	Date	Name	Circuit	Race Regulations	Weather	Race Distance	Winner's Time	Winning driver	Winning constructor	Fastest lap	Report
3	30 May	(United States) XVI International 500 Mile; Sweepstakes	Indianapolis	AAA	?	500 miles	5h 02m	(United States) Louis Meyer	Miller 91	not recorded	Report
	1 Jul	(France) XXII Grand Prix de l’ACF; IV Grand Prix du Comminges	Saint-Gaudens	sports, handicap	?	260 km	2h 28m	(United Kingdom) William Grover-Williams (“W. Williams”)	Bugatti Type 35C	(United Kingdom) William Grover-Williams; Bugatti	Report
	15 Jul	(Germany) III Großer Preis von Deutschland	Nürburgring	sports	?	510 km	4h 54m	(Germany) Rudolf Caracciola (Germany) Christian Werner	Mercedes-Benz SS	(Germany) Rudolf Caracciola; Mercedes-Benz	Report
	29 Jul	(Spain) IV Spanish Grand Prix	Lasarte	sports, handicap	?	270 km	2h 25m	(Monaco) Louis Chiron	Bugatti Type 35C	not recorded	Report
10	9 Sep	(Italy) VIII Italian Grand Prix / VI European Grand Prix	Monza	Formula Libre	cloudy	600 km	3h 45m	(Monaco) Louis Chiron	Bugatti Type 37A	(Italy) Luigi Arcangeli; Talbot	Report

A pink background indicates the race was run for Sports Cars or Touring Cars this year. Sources:

== Major Races ==
	Date	Name	Circuit	Race Regulations	Weather	Race Distance	Winner's Time	Winning driver	Winning constructor	Report
	11 Mar/ 31 Mar	(Kingdom of Italy) IV Gran Premio di Tripoli	Tagiura	Formula Libre	sunny	420 km	3h 20m	(Italy) Tazio Nuvolari	Bugatti Type 35C	Report
	25 Mar	(Italy) III Circuito del Pozzo	Verona	Formula Libre	rain	310 km	2h 41m	(Italy) Tazio Nuvolari	Bugatti Type 35C	Report
	26 Mar	(Australia) 100 Miles Road Race	Phillip Island	Formula Libre; 2x handicap races	sunny	100 miles	1h 47m	(Australia) Capt Arthur Waite	Austin 7	Report
	9 Apr	(France) I Grand Prix d’Antibes-Juan-les-Pins	La Garoupe	Formula Libre	sunny	310 km	4h 11m	(Monaco) Louis Chiron	Bugatti Type 35B	Report
1	22 Apr/ 24 Apr	(Italy) V Circuito di Alessandria	Alessandria	Formula Libre	cold, showers	260 km	2h 31m	(Italy) Tazio Nuvolari	Bugatti Type 35C	Report
2	6 May	(Italy) XIX Targa Florio (Italy) XI Coppa Florio (Note: The Targa Florio and the Coppa Florio were run simultaneously over the same route.)	Medio Madonie	Targa Florio	sunny	540 km	7h 21m	(France) Albert Divo	Bugatti Type 35B	Report
	6 May	(French Algeria) I Grand Prix d’Algèrie	Staouéli	Formula Libre	rain	360 km	3h 53m	(France) Marcel Lehoux	Bugatti Type 35C	Report
	13 May	(Italy) II Coppa Messina	Monti Peloritani	Formula Libre	sunny	360 km	4h 49m	(Switzerland) Edwald Probst	Bugatti Type 37A	Report
	16 May	(France) I Coupe de Bourgogne	Dijon	Formula Libre	?	490 km	?	(France) Jannine Jennky	Bugatti Type 35C	Report
	20 May	(Italy) III Coppa Etna	Catania	Formula Libre	?	350 km	3h 35m	(Italy) Baconin Borzacchini	Maserati 26B	Report
	20 May	(Belgium) III Grand Prix des Frontières	Chimay	Voiturette	?	220 km	2h 01m	(France) Yves Giraud-Cabantous	Salmson GS	Report
	3 Jun	(Tunisia) I Grand Prix de Tunisie	Le Bardo	Formula Libre	hot	320 km	2h 39m	(France) Marcel Lehoux	Bugatti Type 35C	Report
	3 Jun	(Italy) VIII Circuito del Mugello (Targa Giulio Masetti)	Mugello	Formula Libre	sunny	370 km	5h 15m	(Italy) Emilio Materassi	Talbot 700	Report
4	10 Jun	(Italy) IV Premio Reale di Roma	Tre Fontane	Formula Libre	hot	390 km	3h 06m	(Monaco) Louis Chiron	Bugatti Type 35C	Report
	10 Jun	(France) IV Grand Prix de Picardie	Péronne	Formula Libre	?	190 km	1h 59m	(France) Philippe Auber	Bugatti Type 37A	Report
5	24 Jun	(Italy) III Circuito di Cremona	Cremona	Formula Libre	hot	320 km	1h 58m	(Italy) Luigi Arcangeli	Talbot 700	Report
	24 Jun	(France) Grand Prix Bugatti	Le Mans	Formula Libre	?	280 km	2h 13m	(France) André Dubonnet	Bugatti Type 37	Report
6	8 Jul	(France) IV Grand Prix de la Marne	Reims-Gueux	Formula Libre	cloudy	400 km	3h 01m	(Monaco) Louis Chiron	Bugatti Type 35C	Report
	21 Jul	(United Kingdom) VIII Junior Car Club 200	Brooklands	Voiturette	?	200 miles	2h 35m	(United Kingdom) Capt Malcolm Campbell	Delage 135B	Report
7	25 Jul	(Spain) VI Gran Premio de San Sebastián (Gran Criterium de los Ases)	Lasarte	Formula Libre	sunny	690 km	5h 21m	(Monaco) Louis Chiron	Bugatti Type 35C	Report
8	4 Aug	(Italy) V Coppa Acerbo	Pescara	Formula Libre	hot	510 km	4h 39m	(Italy) Giuseppe Campari	Alfa Romeo P2	Report
9	19 Aug	(Italy) VIII Coppa Montenero	Montenero	Formula Libre	sunny	225 km	2h 39m	(Italy) Emilio Materassi	Talbot 700	Report
	23 Aug	(France) V Grand Prix de la Baule	La Baule	Formula Libre	hot	100 km	48m	(France) Aimery Blacque Belair	Bugatti Type 35C	Report
	9 Sep	(France) VII Grand Prix de Boulogne	Boulogne-sur-Mer	Formula Libre	?	450 km	3h 51m	(United Kingdom) Capt Malcolm Campbell	Delage 15SB	Report

== Teams and drivers ==
These tables only intend to cover entries in the major races, as keyed above. Sources:

Entrant	Constructor	Chassis	Engine	Tyre	Driver	Rounds
(France) Usines Bugatti	Bugatti	Type 37A; Type 35C; Type 35B	Bugatti 1.5L S4 s/c Bugatti 2.0L S8 s/c Bugatti 2.3L S8 s/c		(Monaco) Louis Chiron	2, 4
(France) Usines Bugatti	Bugatti	Type 37A; Type 35C; Type 35B	Bugatti 1.5L S4 s/c Bugatti 2.0L S8 s/c Bugatti 2.3L S8 s/c		(Italy) Conte Gastone Brilli-Peri	2, 4
(France) Usines Bugatti	Bugatti	Type 37A; Type 35C; Type 35B	Bugatti 1.5L S4 s/c Bugatti 2.0L S8 s/c Bugatti 2.3L S8 s/c		(Italy) Ferdinando Minoia	2, 4
(France) Usines Bugatti	Bugatti	Type 37A; Type 35C; Type 35B	Bugatti 1.5L S4 s/c Bugatti 2.0L S8 s/c Bugatti 2.3L S8 s/c		(Italy) Conte Caberto Conelli	2
(France) Usines Bugatti	Bugatti	Type 37A; Type 35C; Type 35B	Bugatti 1.5L S4 s/c Bugatti 2.0L S8 s/c Bugatti 2.3L S8 s/c		(France) Albert Divo	2
(France) Usines Bugatti	Bugatti	Type 37A; Type 35C; Type 35B	Bugatti 1.5L S4 s/c Bugatti 2.0L S8 s/c Bugatti 2.3L S8 s/c		(United Kingdom) William Grover-Williams	[4]
(Italy) Officine Alfieri Maserati SpA	Maserati	Tipo 26B; Tipo 26R; Tipo 26	Maserati 2.0L S8 s/c Maserati 1.7L S8 s/c Maserati 1.5L S8 s/c		(Italy) Ernesto Maserati	2, 4, [8], 9, 10
(Italy) Officine Alfieri Maserati SpA	Maserati	Tipo 26B; Tipo 26R; Tipo 26	Maserati 2.0L S8 s/c Maserati 1.7L S8 s/c Maserati 1.5L S8 s/c		(Italy) Baconin Borzacchini	2, [4], [8], 9, 10
(Italy) Officine Alfieri Maserati SpA	Maserati	Tipo 26B; Tipo 26R; Tipo 26	Maserati 2.0L S8 s/c Maserati 1.7L S8 s/c Maserati 1.5L S8 s/c		(Italy) Luigi Fagioli	2, [4], 8
(Italy) Officine Alfieri Maserati SpA	Maserati	Tipo 26B; Tipo 26R; Tipo 26	Maserati 2.0L S8 s/c Maserati 1.7L S8 s/c Maserati 1.5L S8 s/c		(Italy) Marchese Diego de Sterlich	2, [4], 8
(Italy) Officine Alfieri Maserati SpA	Maserati	Tipo 26B; Tipo 26R; Tipo 26	Maserati 2.0L S8 s/c Maserati 1.7L S8 s/c Maserati 1.5L S8 s/c		(Italy) Conte Aymo Maggi	10
(Italy) Officine Alfieri Maserati SpA	Maserati	Tipo 26B; Tipo 26R; Tipo 26	Maserati 2.0L S8 s/c Maserati 1.7L S8 s/c Maserati 1.5L S8 s/c		(Italy) Cesare Pastore	10*
(Italy) Alfa Corse	Alfa Romeo	Alfa Romeo 6C 1500 MMS	Alfa Romeo 1.5L S6		(Italy) Giuseppe Campari	2
(Italy) Alfa Corse	Alfa Romeo	Alfa Romeo 6C 1500 MMS	Alfa Romeo 1.5L S6		(Italy) Attilio Marinoni	2
(United States) Duesenberg Bros	Duesenberg	Type 91	Duesenberg 1.5L S8 s/c	F	(United States) Benny Shoaff	3
(United States) Miller Automobiles	Miller	Type 91 FD	Miller 1.5L S8 s/c	F	(United States) Ralph Hepburn	3
(United States) Cooper Engineering; Marmon Motor Car Company	Cooper-Miller	FD; Type 91 FD	Miller 1.5L S8 s/c Miller 1.5L S8 s/c	F	(United States) Pete Kreis	3
(United States) Cooper Engineering; Marmon Motor Car Company	Cooper-Miller	FD; Type 91 FD	Miller 1.5L S8 s/c Miller 1.5L S8 s/c	F	(United States) Johnny Seymour	3
(United States) Cooper Engineering; Marmon Motor Car Company	Cooper-Miller	FD; Type 91 FD	Miller 1.5L S8 s/c Miller 1.5L S8 s/c	F	(United States) Russ Snowberger	3
(United States) Green Engineering	Green		Green 1.5L V8 s/c	F	(United States) Clarence Belt	3
(United States) Green Engineering	Green		Green 1.5L V8 s/c	F	(United States) Harry Nichols	3*
(France) Société Nouvelle de l'Automobile Amilcar	Amilcar	CO	Amilcar 1.1L S6 s/c		(France) André Morel	4
(France) Société Nouvelle de l'Automobile Amilcar	Amilcar	CO	Amilcar 1.1L S6 s/c		(France) Charles Martin	4
(France) Société Nouvelle de l'Automobile Amilcar	Amilcar	CO	Amilcar 1.1L S6 s/c		(France) Jules Moriceau	4
(Italy) Scuderia Materassi	Talbot Bugatti	700 GPLB; Type 35C	Talbot 1.5L S8 s/c Bugatti 2.0L S8 s/c		(Italy) Emilio Materassi †	1, 2, 4, 5, 8, 9, 10
(Italy) Scuderia Materassi	Talbot Bugatti	700 GPLB; Type 35C	Talbot 1.5L S8 s/c Bugatti 2.0L S8 s/c		(Italy) Luigi Arcangeli	1, 5, 8, 10
(Italy) Scuderia Materassi	Talbot Bugatti	700 GPLB; Type 35C	Talbot 1.5L S8 s/c Bugatti 2.0L S8 s/c		(Italy) Giuseppe Morandi	4
(Italy) Scuderia Materassi	Talbot Bugatti	700 GPLB; Type 35C	Talbot 1.5L S8 s/c Bugatti 2.0L S8 s/c		(Italy) Carlo Rosti	5
(Italy) Scuderia Materassi	Talbot Bugatti	700 GPLB; Type 35C	Talbot 1.5L S8 s/c Bugatti 2.0L S8 s/c		(Italy) Conte Gastone Brilli-Peri	10
(Italy) Scuderia Materassi	Talbot Bugatti	700 GPLB; Type 35C	Talbot 1.5L S8 s/c Bugatti 2.0L S8 s/c		(Italy) Gianfranco Comotti	10
(Italy) Scuderia Nuvolari	Bugatti	Type 35C	Bugatti 2.0L S8 s/c		(Italy) Tazio Nuvolari	1, 2, 4, 5, 8, 9, 10
(Italy) Scuderia Nuvolari	Bugatti	Type 35C	Bugatti 2.0L S8 s/c		(Italy) Achille Varzi	1
(Italy) Scuderia Nuvolari	Bugatti	Type 35C	Bugatti 2.0L S8 s/c		(Italy) Pietro Ghersi	1
(Italy) Giulio Aymini	Delage	2LCV	Delage 2.0L V12 s/c		(Italy) Conte Giulio Aymini	1, 4, [5], 10
(Italy) Giulio Aymini	Delage	2LCV	Delage 2.0L V12 s/c		(Italy) Federico Valpreda	1
(Italy) Giulio Aymini	Delage	2LCV	Delage 2.0L V12 s/c		(Italy) Achille Varzi	4
(United States) Bill White Race Cars	Miller	Type 91	Miller 1.5L S8 s/c	F	(United States) George Souders	3
(United States) Bill White Race Cars	Miller	Type 91	Miller 1.5L S8 s/c	F	(United States) Fred Frame	3
(United States) Bill White Race Cars	Miller	Type 91	Miller 1.5L S8 s/c	F	(United States) Ralph Hepburn	3*
(United States) Boyle Valve	Miller	Type 91; Type 91 FD	Miller 1.5L S8 s/c	F	(United States) Cliff Woodbury	3
(United States) Boyle Valve	Miller	Type 91; Type 91 FD	Miller 1.5L S8 s/c	F	(United States) Fred Comer	3
(United States) Boyle Valve	Miller	Type 91; Type 91 FD	Miller 1.5L S8 s/c	F	(United States) Billy Arnold	3
(United States) Boyle Valve	Miller	Type 91; Type 91 FD	Miller 1.5L S8 s/c	F	(United States) Dave Evans	3*
(United States) Boyle Valve	Miller	Type 91; Type 91 FD	Miller 1.5L S8 s/c	F	(United States) Bill Spence	3*
(United States) Elgin Piston Pin	Miller	Type 91	Miller 1.5L S8 s/c	F	(United States) Henry Kohlert	3
(United States) Elgin Piston Pin	Miller	Type 91	Miller 1.5L S8 s/c	F	(United States) Shorty Cantlon	3*
(United States) Elgin Piston Pin	Miller	Type 91	Miller 1.5L S8 s/c	F	(United States) W. E. Shattuc	3*
(United States) Flying Cloud / Peter DePaolo	Miller	Type 91 FD	Miller 1.5L S8 s/c	F	(United States) Pete DePaolo	[3]
(United States) Flying Cloud / Peter DePaolo	Miller	Type 91 FD	Miller 1.5L S8 s/c	F	(United States) Wilbur Shaw	3
(United States) Flying Cloud / Peter DePaolo	Miller	Type 91 FD	Miller 1.5L S8 s/c	F	(United States) Ray Keech	3
(United States) Stutz Blackhawk	Miller	Type 91	Miller 1.5L S8 s/c	F	(United States) Tony Gulotta	3

=== Significant Privateer drivers ===
Entrant	Constructor	Chassis	Engine	Driver	Rounds
Private Entrant	Bugatti	Type 35B	Bugatti 2.3L S8 s/c	(Italy) Pietro Bordino †	[1]
Private Entrant	Bugatti	Type 37A	Bugatti 1.5L S4 s/c	(Italy) Cleto Nenzioni	1, 2, 4, 5, 10
Private Entrant	Bugatti	Type 35C	Bugatti 2.0L S8 s/c	(Italy) Giulio Foresti	2, 4, 10
Private Entrant	Bugatti	Type 35B	Bugatti 2.3L S8 s/c	(Czech Republic) Eliška Junková	2
Private Entrant	Miller	Type 91	Miller 1.5L S8 s/c	(United States) “Leon Duray”	3
Private Entrant	Miller	Type 91	Miller 1.5L S8 s/c	(United States) Louis Meyer	3
Private Entrant	Maserati Bugatti	Tipo 26; Type 37A	Maserati 1.5L S8 s/c Bugatti 1.5L S4 s/c	(Italy) Carlo Tonini	4, 5, 8, 9, 10
Private Entrant	Alfa Romeo Alfa Romeo	P2; 1700 MMS	Alfa Romeo 2.0L S8 s/c Alfa Romeo 1.7L S6 s/c	(Italy) Giuseppe Campari	5, 8, 9, 10*
Private Entrant	Bugatti	Type 35C	Bugatti 2.0L S8 s/c	(Italy) Achille Varzi	5, 8, 10
Private Entrant	Bugatti	Type 35C	Bugatti 2.0L S8 s/c	(France) Robert Benoist	7
Private Entrant	Bugatti	Type 35C	Bugatti 2.0L S8 s/c	(Belgium) Guy Bouriat	10
Private Entrant	Bugatti	Type 35C	Bugatti 2.0L S8 s/c	(Monaco) Louis Chiron	10
Private Entrant	Talbot	700 GPLB	Talbot 1.5L S8 s/c	(Italy) Marchese Antonio Brivio	10

Note: * raced in event as a relief driver. Those in brackets show, although entered, the driver did not race
Note: † driver killed during this racing season

== Regulations and Technical ==
With poor fields and declining interest in Grand Prix racing, the AIACR had declared at the start of the 1927 season that it would be the last for the 1.5-litre formula. Manufacturer participation was negligible, and not helped by the increasing economic downturn. Its new formula was based on weight and fuel consumption: cars had to be a minimum 500 kg to a maximum of 750 kg, while Grands Prix were stipulated to be at least 600 km long. Once again, a minimum of three races had to be competed in to qualify for the championship, including the compulsory European Grand Prix, this year awarded to Great Britain. It was also declared that the European Grand Prix would be open to manufacturer-approved private entries and not just works teams. This apparently did not extend to the other races, although this is unclear.

At the end of 1927, a full seven national Grands Prix were scheduled, starting with the Indianapolis 500. Yet, as early as December 1927, the French organising body said it would not run a Grand prix and instead hold a sports-car race. The German federation announced a similar plan in February, while the British were looking at holding their race on the Isle of Man or Ireland. In March, it too was cancelled, and the Italian federation was instead awarded the European GP. After the race at Indianapolis was held, both the Spanish and Belgian authorities cancelled their races, so with just the two rounds left the AIACR was forced to concede and declare the 1928 championship null and void.

However, with no formal international championship, virtually all organisers completely ignored the new regulations and chose to run to a Formula Libre, or open formula with no engine, weight, fuel or distance limitations. This lack of formal regulations opened the door to privateer drivers to bring their older vehicles back to race. This also left the Targa Florio as the blue riband event for the European racers.

The Targa Florio organisers extended the classes back out to five to cover the larger cars – up to 1.1-litre, to 1.5-litre, to 2-litre, to 3-litre and over 3-litre. As in the previous year, the 1100cc cars only ran three laps, while the rest did five laps. Two occupants were required for all cars, unless the driver carried a 70 kg ballast instead. The maximum time allowed for the five laps was 8½ hours. The Coppa Florio, in its alternate year with France, was again put up for competition and being run to the same distance as the Targa, was an additional trophy for the overall winner.

In November 1927, former race-winner and decorated war-hero Eddie Rickenbacker bought the Indianapolis Motor Speedway from Carl Fisher and Jim Allison for $700 000. Meanwhile, the AAA stuck with the 1.5-litre formula which was providing successful racing in America.

=== Technical Innovation ===
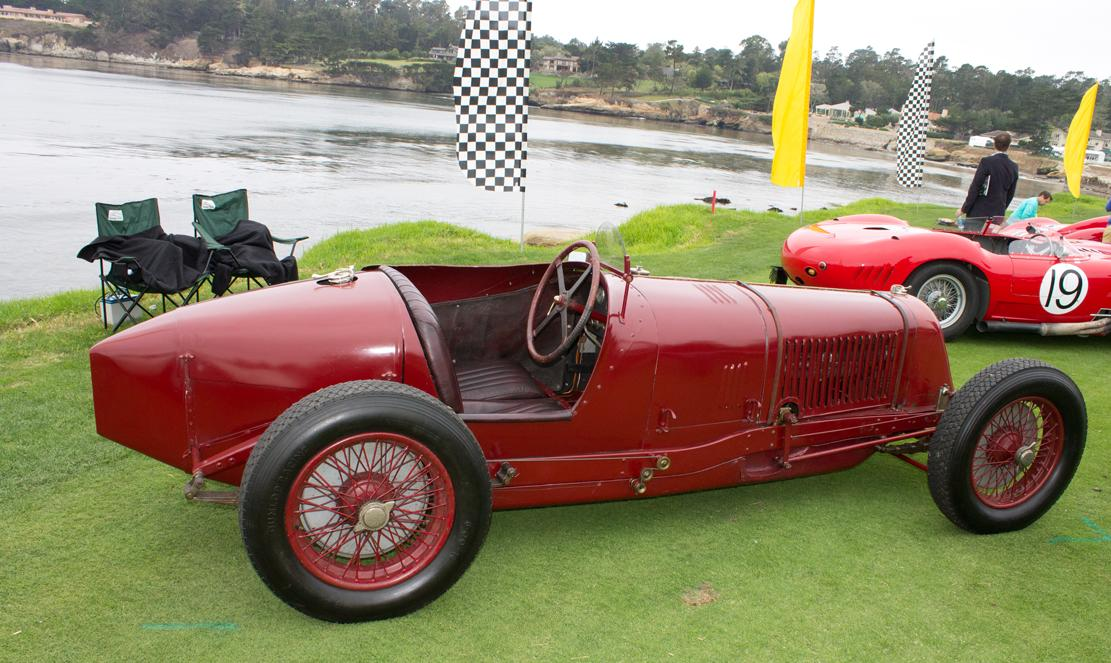
Maserati 26B

With both Delage and Talbot now out of motor-racing, the only works teams left in regular grand-prix racing were Bugatti and Maserati. The deteriorating economic situation meant companies saw racing as a luxury they could not afford, to concentrate on standard road-car manufacture to make money. This stifled technical advancement and development, and privateer drivers instead kept racing their older cars instead of pushing companies to develop better machines.

Ettore Bugatti chose not to bring out any new variants of the eponymous Type 35 chassis. The Maserati Brothers did develop their original Tipo 26 with the 26R with a slightly larger 1.7-litre engine. The troubles at Alfa Romeo continued: Giuseppe Merosi and Giorgio Rimini resigned from the technical board at the start of the year. Then in May, Nicola Romeo was ousted from the board of directors.

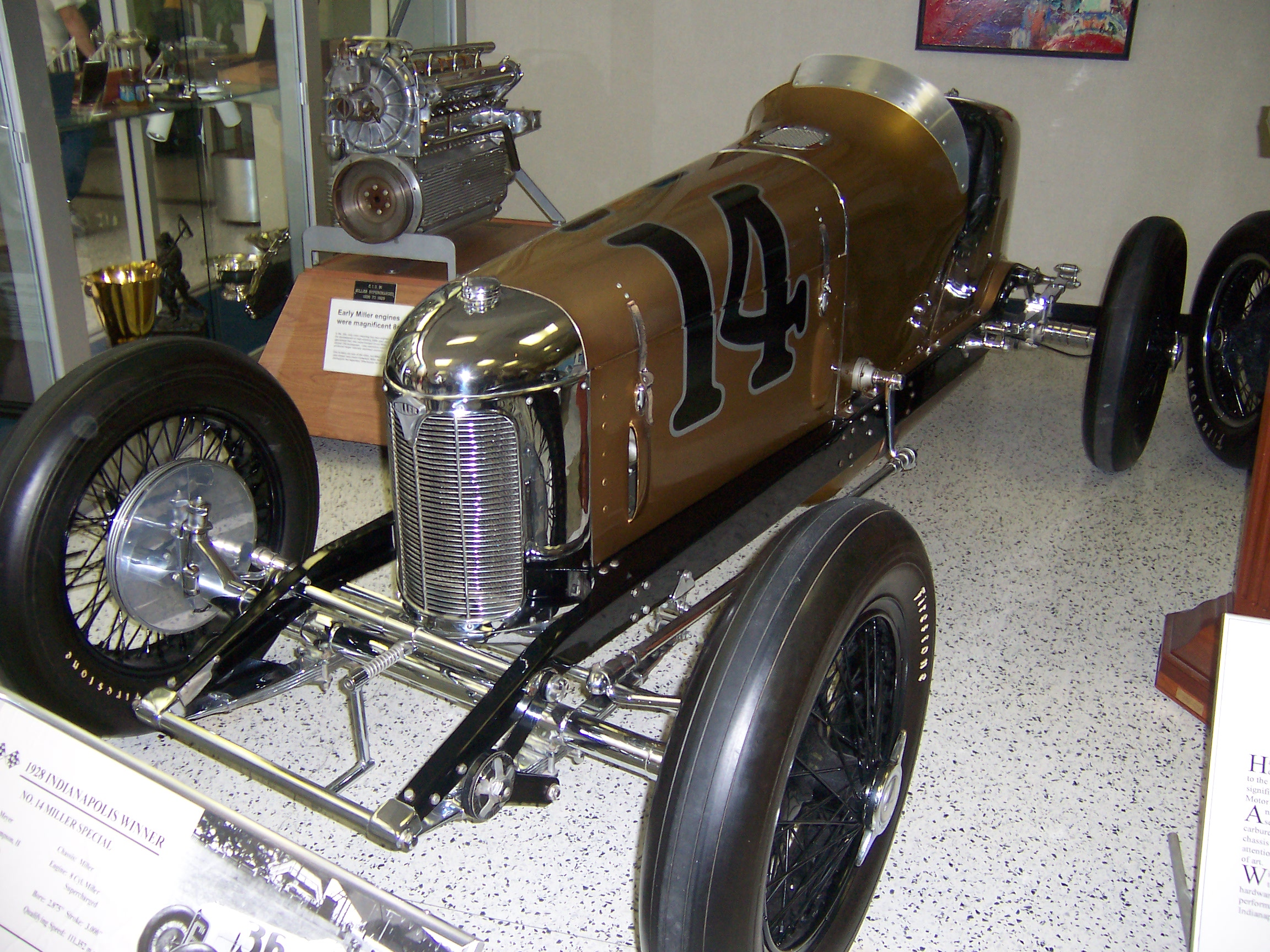
1928 Indianapolis–winning Miller 91

On 22 April, American Ray Keech raised the Land speed record to 207.6 mph with an 81-litre monster at the Daytona Beach Road Course. Three days later, 1926 Indianapolis winner Frank Lockhart was attempting to best him at the same venue. He had already been injured in an earlier attempt in February, and broke 220 mph on his first run. However, on the return run he crashed when a tyre blew and was killed instantly. In March, Kurt C. Volkhart demonstrated Fritz von Opel's RAK-1, the first rocket-powered automobile. In May, Opel did speed trials with the RAK-2 on the AVUS track in Berlin. He reached 230 km/h (140 mph) and got from 0 to 100 km/h (62 mph) in 8 seconds.

Manufacturer	Model	Engine	Power Output	Max. Speed (km/h)	Dry Weight (kg)
(France) Bugatti	Type 37A	Bugatti 1496cc S4 supercharged	90 bhp	180	720
(France) Bugatti	Type 35B	Bugatti 2.3L S8 supercharged	140 bhp	210	710
(Italy) Maserati	Tipo 26B	Maserati 2.0L S8 supercharged			
(Italy) Alfa Romeo	P2	Alfa Romeo 2.0L S8 supercharged	155 bhp	240	750
(France) Talbot (United Kingdom)	700 GPLB	Talbot 1489cc S4 supercharged	140 bhp	210	700

== Season review ==
The season opened with a second running of the Mille Miglia. Bugatti sent a strong works team of Pietro Bordino, Tazio Nuvolari and Gastone Brilli-Peri. To take them on, the Alfa Corse fielded six of their 6C sports cars, including the brand new, supercharged MMS version given to Giuseppe Campari. Although the Bugattis initially led, Campari came through to win by 8 minutes from the OM of race-organiser Franco Mazzotti. OM repeated its success of the previous year: as well as second overall, it cleaned up the first eight places in the 2-litre class.

In the first week of April, several towns of the French Riviera hosted a series of street races, culminating in the Grand Prix d'Antibes on Easter Monday. The race carried a lavish 150 000 francs in prize money and was won by Louis Chiron who had lapped the field twice. It presaged another prestigious street race on the Riviera – the Monaco Grand Prix.

The Circuito di Alessandria was the third round of the Italian Championship. It was a contest between the privateer teams of Tazio Nuvolari and Emilio Materassi. Although Nuvolari won the race after a close duel with his teammate Achille Varzi, the race was overshadowed by the death of Italian racing hero Pietro Bordino. While practicing his brand new Bugatti the weekend before, he hit a dog that ran into the road. The car then tumbled down a ravine, killing Bordino and leaving his mechanic in a coma.

With diminishing international racing, the Targa Florio took on greater significance, and hence attracted a good amount of works interest. Bugatti arrived with five cars for team regulars Ferdinando Minoia, Caberto Conelli and Louis Chiron, as well as Albert Divo (formerly of Talbot and Delage, replacing Bordino) and Gastone Brilli-Peri. Maserati also arrived with purpose. After his serious accident the year before, Alfieri Maserati stayed solely as team manager, while his brother Ernesto joined Baconin Borzacchini and Diego de Sterlich driving the 2-litre 26B, while Luigi Fagioli ran the 1.5-litre Tipo 26.

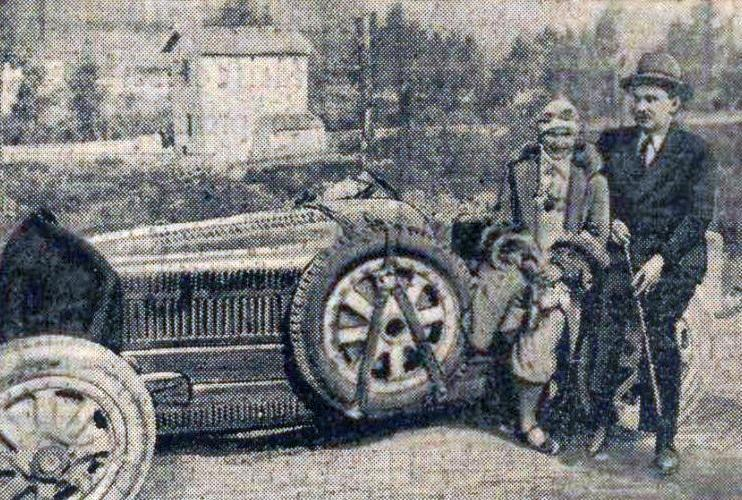
Eliška Junková, with her Bugatti and Vincenzo Florio

The works Alfa Romeo team, Alfa Corse, returned after a 4-year absence with two new 6C sports cars for Campari and Attilio Marinoni. Campari was given the brand new Super Sport version to race. Bugattis again dominated the field with half the entries. The 1927 winner, Emilio Materassi, was one of the dozen privateer drivers. Others included Tazio Nuvolari, René Dreyfus and the popular female Czech driver Eliška Junková. Junková had arrived a month early with her husband and, with a car and guide provided by Vincenzo Florio, set about meticulously mapping the route in what was one of the earliest examples of race-notes, by marking trees and posts with braking points and landmarks.

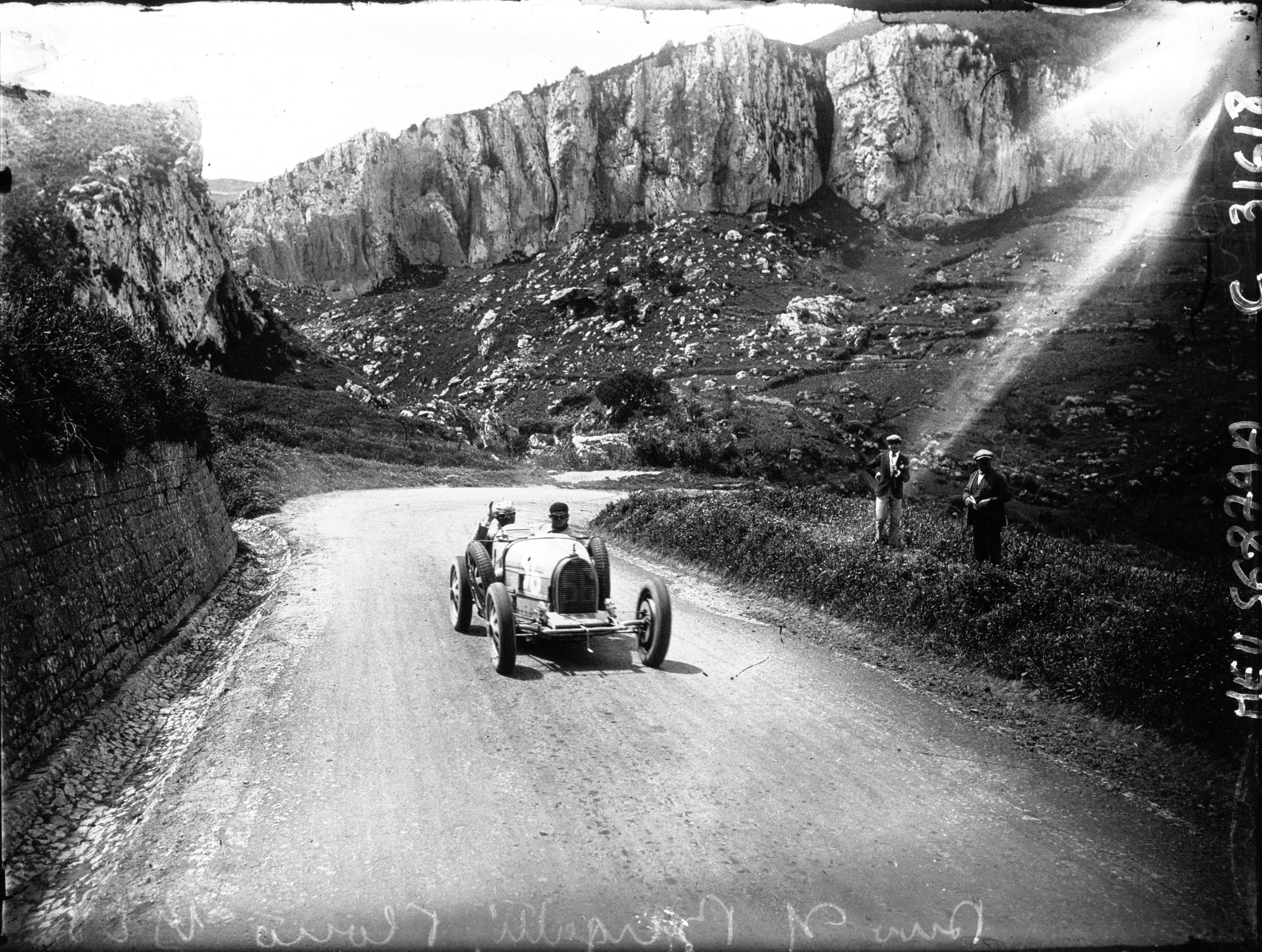
Albert Divo (Bugatti), winner of the Targa Florio

Chiron put in the fastest time to lead at the end of the first lap on elapsed time, with barely thirty seconds back to Campari, Divo and Junková. But when Chiron went off the road, and Divo had to pit, Junková found herself in the lead, racing right behind Divo, who had originally started two minutes earlier. Her meticulous preparation was paying off and despite Campari leading at the end of the third, a puncture dropped him back again, and she led going into the fifth and final lap. From the staggered start, Campari was the first to finish. Conelli brought in his works Bugatti soon after, barely 20 seconds slower, and then Divo stormed in to take the lead by 90 seconds. Unfortunately for Junková, she suffered a puncture, losing two minutes, and then engine overheating forced her to ease off to save the car. She eventually finished fifth behind Chiron, nine minutes behind Divo who gave Bugatti their fourth consecutive victory in the Targa.

=== Indianapolis ===
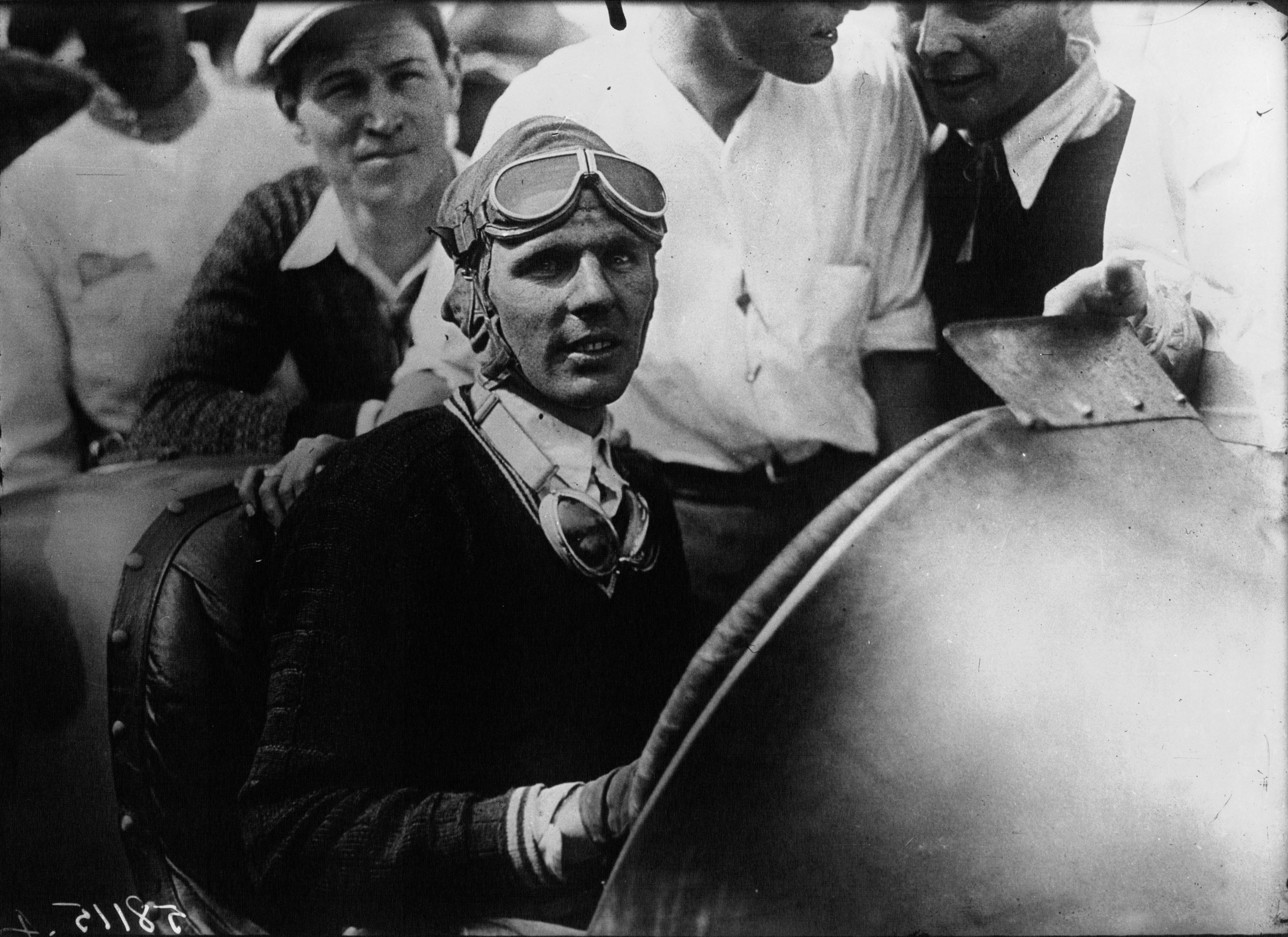
Louis Meyer, winner of the Indianapolis 500

The entry list for the Indianapolis 500 was once again dominated by Millers. Duesenberg had scaled back its participation, while Earl Cooper and Tommy Milton ran cars based around the Miller engines. The front-wheel drive Millers once again proved extremely fast, taking four of the top-six positions on the grid. They were led by George Stewart (who raced under the pseudonym “Leon Duray”) who established a new qualifying record. There were several major accidents in practice: Peter DePaolo rolled his Miller FD suffering mild injuries. His car would subsequently be repaired and Wilbur Shaw qualified it at the back of the grid. On a wet race-day morning L. L. Corum and Dutch Baumann both crashed their cars in warm-up and had to be scratched. This meant that George Souders, a rookie the year before, was the only previous race-winner among the starters.

By the time of the start, the track had dried and the sun was out. Duray bolted into the lead setting a record pace for the first quarter of the race. On lap 35 Benny Shoaff hit oil entering Turn 1 and spun into the wall. He ended up facing toward the traffic but only suffered a bloody nose. Then after 62 laps, Duray's car starting overheating and he slowed, eventually retiring at two-thirds distance. Babe Stapp and Souders then swapped the lead with rookies Jimmy Gleason and Louis Meyer close behind. Gleason's greater speed got him into the lead which he held for the next 100 miles. He then pitted and was relieved by Russ Snowberger who had earlier been the first retiree. Going into the last quarter of the race, the race was between Tony Gulotta in the lead, Gleason (back in his car), and Louis Schneider now relieving for Lou Moore. At lap 160, light rain started falling, with the drivers put under caution for two laps until the shower moved away. The only driver caught out was Earl Devore, who slid and crashed at Turn 1 on lap 161. With twenty laps to go, Gulotta slowed and had to pit because of dropping fuel pressure. On lap 195, Gleason pitted to top up water but his mechanic missed the radiator when pouring and cracked the engine. This left Meyer to take the victory by just under a lap from the Moore/Schneider Miller with Souders four minutes back in third. Ray Keech, despite bad burns on his legs from leaking fuel, came in fourth. Meyer had driven as a relief driver for Wilbur Shaw in 1927 but was technically another rookie winner. He went on to be crowned the 1928 AAA champion.

=== Mid-season races ===
Maserati finally broke the string of nine Bugatti victories in Europe at the Coppa Etna in Sicily, when Borzacchini won for the Italian team. Maserati took three of the top four places, in front of 40000 spectators. But the triumph was marred by an accident as the local Catanian driver Russo crashed into spectators. A teenager was killed and seven seriously injured, including Russo and his mechanic. Racing was also developing in North Africa and the European colonies. Both the Casablanca GP (for touring cars) and Tripoli GP were well-established, but new races were also held that year in Algiers and Tunis. Both were won by Marcel Lehoux in his Bugatti 35C. Lehoux was a Frenchman who ran a successful automotive parts company in Algiers, and was the best of the North African drivers in the 1920s. In the southern hemisphere, the 100-Mile Road Race was held on 6.5 -mile dirt track at Phillip Island in Victoria in April. It would later be known as the first Australian Grand Prix with prize-money of £30. It was won by Arthur Waite, who had worked for Austin in England before becoming the Austin agent in Melbourne.

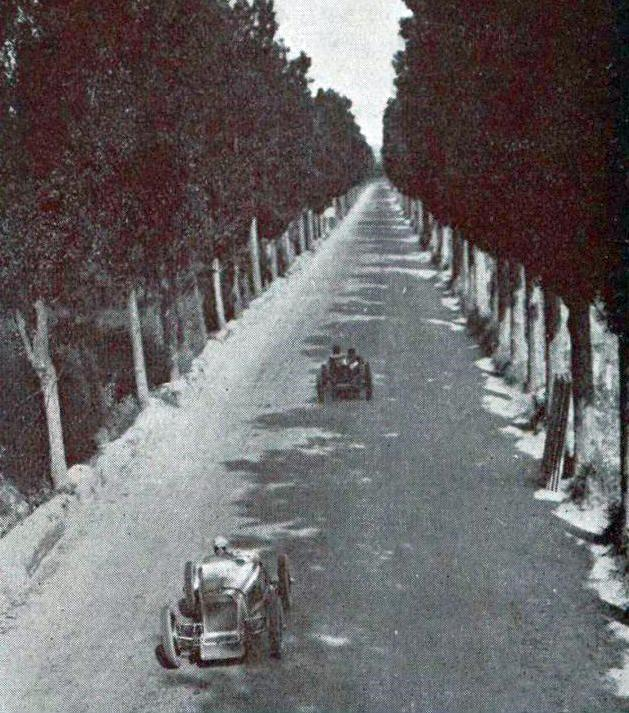
Materassi (Talbot) leading Chiron (Bugatti) in the Rome GP

The Royal Rome GP was raced on a new 13 km road circuit on the southern outskirts of the city. A round of the Italian Championship, it attracted many of the top drivers. Nuvolari, Chiron, Brilli Peri, Minoia and Foresti represented Bugatti, in various guises. Maserati had six cars, including a works entry for Ernesto Maserati while Borzacchini drove as relief for Cesare Pastore with his new car. Materassi had Talbots for himself and Giuseppe Morandi, while Varzi and Aymini ran 1925 Delages. Finally, Amilcar arrived with a 3-car works team to contest the 1.1-litre voiturette class and 23 cars took the grid. Brilli Peri took the lead from the start and he, Chiron and Nuvolari broke away from the rest. They duelled for the first half of the race with Chiron on getting into the lead on the 13th lap. After the half-time pitstops, Chiron held a 1-minute lead over Brilli-Per, with Materassi and Minoia over six minutes behind. The rest of the race was fairly pedestrian, and after 30 laps Chiron won by four minutes from Brilli Peri, then Materassi and Minoia. Luigi Fagioli was the best-finishing Maserati, in fifth. A fortnight later, at the extremely fast Cremona track, Materassi's newest team-mate Luigi Arcangeli won an exciting victory for the Talbot team, by narrowly beating Nuvolari in a race of attrition where only four of the nineteen starters finished.

Eight days after the 24 Hours of Le Mans touring-car endurance race, Ettore Bugatti hosted his first Grand Prix Bugatti at Le Sarthe circuit. Exclusively for privateer Bugatti owners, it was run over two handicap elimination races and a 16-lap final. Prizes were three new Bugatti cars, including the first prize of a supercharged 2-litre grand-prix car (valued at FF165000). It attracted 29 drivers, including Dudley Benjafield, Louis Rigal, "Sabipa" and Goffredo Zehender who had just raced there the week beforehand. The race was won by the wealthy liqueur magnate André Dubonnet. The formerly pre-eminent French GP was a shadow of its past. The Comminges GP was designated the national race, and run as a handicap event for sports cars. Williams won the race in a road-adapted Bugatti 35C ahead of a field of 1100cc cars. The German GP was also a sports car race, and run on the full Nürburgring track. Won by Rudolf Caracciola and Christian Werner in their big 7-litre Mercedes-Benz SS, the race was notable for the death of Čenĕk Junek. Distraught at the death of her husband, Eliška immediately retired from racing.

The San Sebastián Grand Prix was a Bugatti-only affair, as the entry by Caracciola's Mercedes did not eventuate. Although there were only nine starters, it was a high-quality field. Divo led initially until his brakes gave out. Zehender, Lehoux and Robert Benoist then all had a turn at leading until Chiron was once again able to get to the front and claim the victory. Chiron also won the Spanish Grand Prix four days later, which was held as a series of handicap elimination heats for sports cars, before a final race.

The next two rounds of the Italian Championship were the Coppa Acerbo and Coppa Montenero. Campari easily won in his four-year old Alfa on the long straights at Pescara, while Materassi got his revenge at the twisty circuit of the lucrative Livorno race.

=== The European Grand Prix ===
The last major race of the year was the only international Grand Prix. The AIACR declared that their races were no longer exclusive to manufacturer teams. Instead, privateer drivers would be allowed to enter if they got the permission of their car's manufacturer. Without the restrictions of a set formula, the Italian Grand Prix finally drew a sizeable field. Maserati was the only company to send a works team, with two new 1.7-litre Tipo 26R for Baconin Borzacchini and Conte Aymo Maggi, and an older 2-litre 26B for Ernesto Maserati. Bartolomeo Costantini, works team manager for Bugatti, was present to support the privateers. The strongest Bugatti drivers were Louis Chiron, Tazio Nuvolari and “Williams”. Emilio Materassi had bought the cars from the defunct Talbot works team, setting up one of the first private racing teams in Europe – the Scuderia Materassi (being the first use of the term Scuderia for a motor-racing team). His drivers with him, were Conte Gastone Brilli-Peri, Luigi Arcangeli and Gianfranco Comotti. Conte Giulio Aymini had been running a team with 2-litre Delages, but only his own car was entered for this race. Young motorcycle champion, Achille Varzi, a sometime driver for both Aymini and Nuvolari was this time entered to drive Giuseppe Campari's Alfa Romeo P2. On a sunny day, a huge crowd gathered for the race. The start line had been moved to the back straight of the road course and 22 cars lined up on the grid, drawn by lot. At the end of the first lap, Williams had a small lead from Nuvolari and Borzacchini, then the Talbots of Materassi and Brilli-Peri. Williams had built a 20-second lead by the 5th lap when he slowed with a blown engine. Materassi had a misfiring engine and also had to pit to change two tyres, dropping down to ninth. Nuvolari took over the lead, pursued by Varzi who had moved up the field. After 100 km (10 laps), the leading group was Brilli Peri, Nuvolari, Varzi and Chiron covered by only ten seconds and changing positions regularly. Arcangeli then put in the fastest lap of the race to join the group.

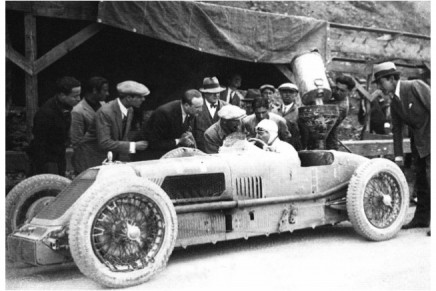
Materassi in his Talbot, refuelling at the Italian GP

On the 18th lap, Materassi was fifth, a minute behind the leading pack and pushing hard to make up time. He was coming off the banking to start a new lap and travelling at 200 km/h. He had closed up behind Foresti's Bugatti to lap him when the Talbot suddenly veered off to the right, then left. It shot across the grass verge, a barbed-wire security fence and then over the 3-metre ditch into the crowd for 50 metres before tumbling back into the ditch. Materassi was thrown clear and died on impact. Twenty-two spectators were killed and another 36 injured. The senior officials immediately met and decided to keep the race running to avoid starting panic. The other four Talbots were withdrawn in respect for their team leader.

While the rescue operation proceeded, Chiron and Varzi fought for the lead, with Nuvolari a minute behind and Borzacchini's Maserati in fourth over two minutes further back, about to be lapped. Then on lap 26 another accident occurred, near the previous one. Borzacchini came off the road course at speed to go onto the banked oval. He hit a retired Bugatti parked between the two parallel tracks, tearing off the Maserati's wheel and skating along the pit-straight for 200 metres before coming to rest. However, this time it had not burst through the fence, and Borzacchini got out shaken, but uninjured. By two-thirds distance, Varzi had been relieved by Campari at his regular fuel-stop. The leading two had built a two-lap lead over the rest of the field. The Bugattis of Nuvolari and Drouet scrapped for third with Maggi's Maserati (now driven by Borzacchini) five laps in arrears. The positions stayed like this for the rest of the race, with Chiron, and Bugatti, winning by two minutes from the Alfa Romeo with Nuvolari a distant fourteen minutes back in third.

This event highlighted the need for better safety measures at the Italian circuit. Examination of the cars found no evidence of them hitting each other, and it was ruled that Materassi's steering manoeuvre to overtake was too strong and caused the car to lose adhesion. For the following two seasons the Italian Grand Prix was not held, while the Monza circuit underwent a complete upgrade. A subsequent official court decision in 1931 found the race organisers and Automobile Club of Italy had not taken sufficient precautions for crowd safety and were ordered to pay reparations to the families of the victims.

Louis Chiron was the dominant driver of the season, winning major races for Bugatti in France, Italy and Spain. Bugatti dominated the podiums through the year, and before his fatal accident, Materassi's Talbot team had won most of the others. Materassi himself had ended the Italian season with the highest earnings (185000 lire) ahead of Nuvolari's (178000 lire). Consistency gave Giuseppe Campari the Italian Driver's Championship. Despite the lack of technical development, the opening up of racing to privateers gave bigger grids and close racing, and had proven popular with spectators.

== Results of the season's major races ==
Pos	Driver	Team	ALS (Italy)	TGF (Italy)	IND (United States)	ROM (Italy)	CRE (Italy)	MAR (France)	SEB (Spain)	CAC (Italy)	CMN (Italy)	ITA (Italy)
	(Monaco) Louis Chiron	Usines Bugatti; Private Entry		4		1		1	1			1
	(Italy) Tazio Nuvolari	Scuderia Nuvolari	1	Ret		Ret	2			4	2	3
	(Italy) Giuseppe Campari	SA Alfa Romeo		2			Ret			1	3	[2]
	(Italy) Luigi Arcangeli	Scuderia Materassi	Ret				1			2		WD
	(Italy) Emilio Materassi	Scuderia Materassi	4	Ret		3	3			Ret [2]	1	Ret †
	(France) Albert Divo	Usines Bugatti		1					Ret			
	(United States) Louis Meyer	Private Entry			1							
	(Italy) Achille Varzi	Scuderia Nuvolari; Giulio Aymini; SA Alfa Romeo	2			Ret	Ret			Ret		2
	(United States) Lou Moore	Private Entry			2							
	(Italy) Gastone Brilli-Peri	Usines Bugatti; Scuderia Materassi		Ret		2				Ret		WD
	(France) Robert Gauthier	Private Entry						2				
	(France) Robert Benoist	Private Entry							2			
	(Italy) Carlo Tonini	Private Entry				Ret	Ret			3	4	Ret
	(Italy) Federico Valpreda	Giulio Aymini	3									
	(Italy) Caberto Conelli	Usines Bugatti		3								
	(United States) George Souders	Bill White Race Cars			3							
	(France) Philippe Aubert	Private Entry						3				
	(France) Marcel Lehoux	Private Entry							3			
	(Italy) Tommaso Saccomanni	Private Entry					4			5		
	(Italy) Ferdinando Minoia	Usines Bugatti		6		4						
	(United States) Ray Keech	Peter de Paolo / Flying Cloud			4							
	(France) José Scaron	Private Entry						4				
	(Italy) Goffredo Zehender	Private Entry							4			
	(Italy) Guy Drouet	Private Entry						Ret				4
	(Italy) Luigi Fagioli	Officine Alfieri Maserati		7		5	Ret			7		
	(Italy) Luigi Beccaria	Private Entry	5								Ret	
	(Czech Republic) Eliška Junková	Private Entry		5								
	(United States) Norman Batten	Private Entry			5							
	(France) Antonio Valette	Private Entry						5				
	(Argentina) Manuel Blancas	Private Entry							5			DNS
	(Italy) Letterio Cucinotta	Private Entry								Ret	5	
	(Italy) Aymo Maggi	Officine Alfieri Maserati										5
	(Italy) Ernesto Maserati	Officine Alfieri Maserati		11		Ret				DNS	9	6
	(Switzerland) Mario Lepori	Private Entry		9		6			DSQ			
	(Italy) Clemente Biondetti	Private Entry	13	Ret							6	
	(Italy) Cleto Nenzioni	Private Entry	6	Ret		Ret	Ret					Ret
	(United States) Elbert 'Babe' Stapp	Private Entry			6							
	(France) ? Vincent Tersen	Private Entry						6				
	(Spain) Francisco Torres	Private Entry							6			
Pos	Driver	Team	ALS (Italy)	TGF (Italy)	IND (United States)	ROM (Italy)	CRE (Italy)	MAR (France)	SEB (Spain)	CAC (Italy)	CMN (Italy)	ITA (Italy)

italics show the driver of the race's fastest lap.
Only those drivers with a best finish of 6th or better are shown. Sources:

Citations
