= 1929 AAA Championship Car season =

Auto racing season

- AAA National Championship Trail

Season
- Races: 5
- Start date: May 30
- End date: September 2

Awards
- National champion: (United States) Louis Meyer
- Indianapolis 500 winner: (United States) Ray Keech

The 1929 AAA Championship Car season consisted of five races, beginning in Speedway, Indiana on May 30 and concluding in Tyrone, Pennsylvania on September 2. There were also three non-championship races. The AAA National Champion was Louis Meyer and the Indianapolis 500 winner was Ray Keech.

Bill Spence died during the Indianapolis 500 on May 30. Ray Keech, who won the Indianapolis 500 a few weeks ago, died at Altoona during the first race on June 15.

== Schedule and results ==
All races running on Dirt/Brick/Board Oval.

Rnd	Date	Race name	Track	Location	Type	Pole position	Winning driver
NC	May 26	(United States) Toledo Race 1 - 100	Fort Miami Speedway	Toledo, Ohio	Dirt	—	(United States) Wilbur Shaw
1	May 30	(United States) International 500 Mile Sweepstakes	Indianapolis Motor Speedway	Speedway, Indiana	Brick	(United States) Cliff Woodbury	(United States) Ray Keech
NC	June 2	(United States) Cleveland Race - 100^{A}	Randall Park Raceway	North Randall, Ohio	Dirt	—	(United States) Wilbur Shaw
2	June 9	(United States) Detroit Race - 100	Michigan State Fairgrounds	Detroit, Michigan	Dirt	(United States) Ray Keech	(United States) Cliff Woodbury
3	June 15	(United States) Altoona Race 1 - 200^{B}	Altoona Speedway	Tyrone, Pennsylvania	Board	(United States) Cliff Woodbury	(United States) Louis Meyer
NC	August 18	(United States) Toledo Race 2 - 100	Fort Miami Speedway	Toledo, Ohio	Dirt	—	(United States) Wilbur Shaw
4	August 31	(United States) Syracuse Race - 100	New York State Fairgrounds	Syracuse, New York	Dirt	(United States) Shorty Cantlon	(United States) Wilbur Shaw
5	September 2	(United States) Altoona Race 2 - 200	Altoona Speedway	Tyrone, Pennsylvania	Board	(United States) Lou Moore	(United States) Louis Meyer

^A Scheduled for 100 miles, but stopped after 85 miles.
^B Scheduled for 200 miles, stopped due to fatal wreck involving then-leader Ray Keech. AAA rules stated that no car involved in a wreck could score points, so the win reverted to Louis Meyer.

== Final points standings ==
- Note 1: Drivers had to be running at the finish to score points. Points scored by drivers sharing a ride were split according to percentage of race driven. Starters were not allowed to score points as relief drivers, if a race starter finished the race in another car, in a points scoring position, those points were awarded to the driver who had started the car.
- Note 2: Carl Marchese, L. L. Corum, and Louis Chiron were ineligible for points.
- The final standings based on reference.

Pos	Driver	INDY (United States)	DET (United States)	ALT1 (United States)	SYR (United States)	ALT2 (United States)	Pts
1	(United States) Louis Meyer	2*	2	1	15	1	1330
2	(United States) Ray Keech	1	**14**	10*			1000
3	(United States) Wilbur Shaw		5		1	5	240
4	(United States) Fred Frame	10			11	2	231
5	(United States) Cliff Woodbury	**33**	1	**11**	DNQ		200
6	(United States) Cliff Bergere	9		2		10	186
7	(United States) Freddie Winnai	5	7	5	3	7	168
8	(United States) Jimmy Gleason	3	12	9	8		166
9	(United States) Frank Brisko RY	11			2		110
10	(United States) Myron Stevens R	DNQ				3	110
11	(United States) Deacon Litz	24		3	12	13	90
12	(United States) Lou Moore	13	3	13		**8**	70
13	(United States) Shorty Cantlon	13			**14**	4	60
14	(United States) Billy Arnold	8	9		6	6	56
15	(United States) Ernie Triplett R	26		4			50
16	(United States) Chet Gardner	6	10	12	13	11	41
17	(United States) Zeke Meyer	15		DNS	4		35
18	(United States) Russ Snowberger	18	4		DNQ		35
19	(United States) Roscoe Ford R	5					35
20	(United States) William Gardner R	6		7		9	34
21	(United States) Paul Bost R	8			5		25
22	(United States) Bob Robinson	DNQ	6	8	DNQ		25
23	(United States) Fred Roberts R	8					22
24	(United States) Dave Evans	15		6	DNQ		20
25	(United States) Thane Houser	3					16
26	(United States) Bill Albertson R	14			7		10
-	(United States) Carl Marchese R	4					0
-	(United States) L. L. Corum	5					0
-	(Monaco) Louis Chiron R	7					0
-	(United States) Herman Schurch R	20			10		0
-	(United States) Ralph DePalma	DNQ	11				0
-	(United States) Gordon Condon R				DNQ	12	0
-	(United States) Phil Shafer	12					0
-	(United States) Barney Kleopfer R	13					0
-	(United States) Bill Lindau R	19		14			0
-	(United States) Frank Farmer	14					0
-	(United States) Wesley Crawford	15					0
-	(United States) Ted Simpson R	15					0
-	(United States) Pete Kreis	16					0
-	(United States) Tony Gulotta	17					0
-	(United States) Bob McDonogh	18					0
-	(United States) Jack Buxton R	20					0
-	(United States) Johnny Seymour	21		DNS			0
-	(United States) Leon Duray	22					0
-	(United States) Rick Decker R	23		DNS	DNQ		0
-	(Kingdom of Italy) Giovanni Rossi R	23					0
-	(United States) Bert Karnatz R	25			DNQ		0
-	(United States) Babe Stapp	28					0
-	(France) Jules Moriceau R	29					0
-	(United States) Peter DePaolo	30					0
-	(United States) Ralph Hepburn	31					0
-	(United States) Bill Spence	32					0
-	(United States) Phil Pardee	DNS					0
-	(United States) Sam Grecco	DNQ			DNQ		0
-	(United States) Joe Baker	DNQ					0
-	(United States) C. H. Cunard	DNQ					0
-	(United States) Cliff Durant	DNQ					0
-	(United States) Ira Hall	DNQ					0
-	(United States) Jim Hill	DNQ					0
-	(United States) Ralph Miller	DNQ					0
-	(United States) Ray Smith	DNQ					0
-	(United States) Steve Smith	DNQ					0
-	(United States) Frank Sweigert	DNQ					0
-	(United States) Henry Turgeon	DNQ					0
-	(United States) John Vance	DNQ					0
-	(United States) Louis Schneider			DNQ			0
-	(United States) Bo Amos				DNQ		0
-	(United States) Al Aspen				DNQ		0
-	(United States) Norval DeLelys				DNQ		0
-	(United States) Myron Fults				DNQ		0
-	(United States) Charles Ganung				DNQ		0
-	(Kingdom of Italy) Paolo Gimarino				DNQ		0
-	(United States) Harold Larzelere				DNQ		0
-	(United States) Hap Ray				DNQ		0
-	(United States) Charles Schwab				DNQ		0
-	(United States) Al Stewart				DNQ		0
-	(United States) Archie Waterman				DNQ		0
-	(United States) George Wingerter				DNQ		0
-	(Kingdom of Italy) Gianfranco Comotti	Wth					0
Pos	Driver	INDY (United States)	DET (United States)	ALT1 (United States)	SYR (United States)	ALT2 (United States)	Pts

Color	Result
Gold	Winner
Silver	2nd place
Bronze	3rd place
Green	4th & 5th place
Light Blue	6th-10th place
Dark Blue	Finished (Outside Top 10)
Purple	Did not finish (Ret)
Red	Did not qualify (DNQ)
Brown	Withdrawn (Wth)
Black	Disqualified (DSQ)
White	Did not start (DNS)
Blank	Did not participate (DNP)
Blank	Not competing

**In-line notation**
**Bold**	Pole position
Italics	Ran fastest race lap
*	Led most race laps
Rookie of the Year
Rookie

== See also ==
- 1929 Indianapolis 500
