= Karnatz =

Karnatz is a German surname which is toponymical from a place in eastern Germany, also named Karnatz.

It may refer to:

- Bernhard Karnatz (1882–1976), German lawyer and church official
- Bert Karnatz (1905–1932), American racing driver
- Joachim Karnatz (1921–1977), German politician
- Sebastian Karnatz (born 1981), German art historian
- Ulrich Karnatz (born 1952), German rower and Olympics competitor
