= 1929 Indianapolis 500 =

American motor race

17th Indianapolis 500
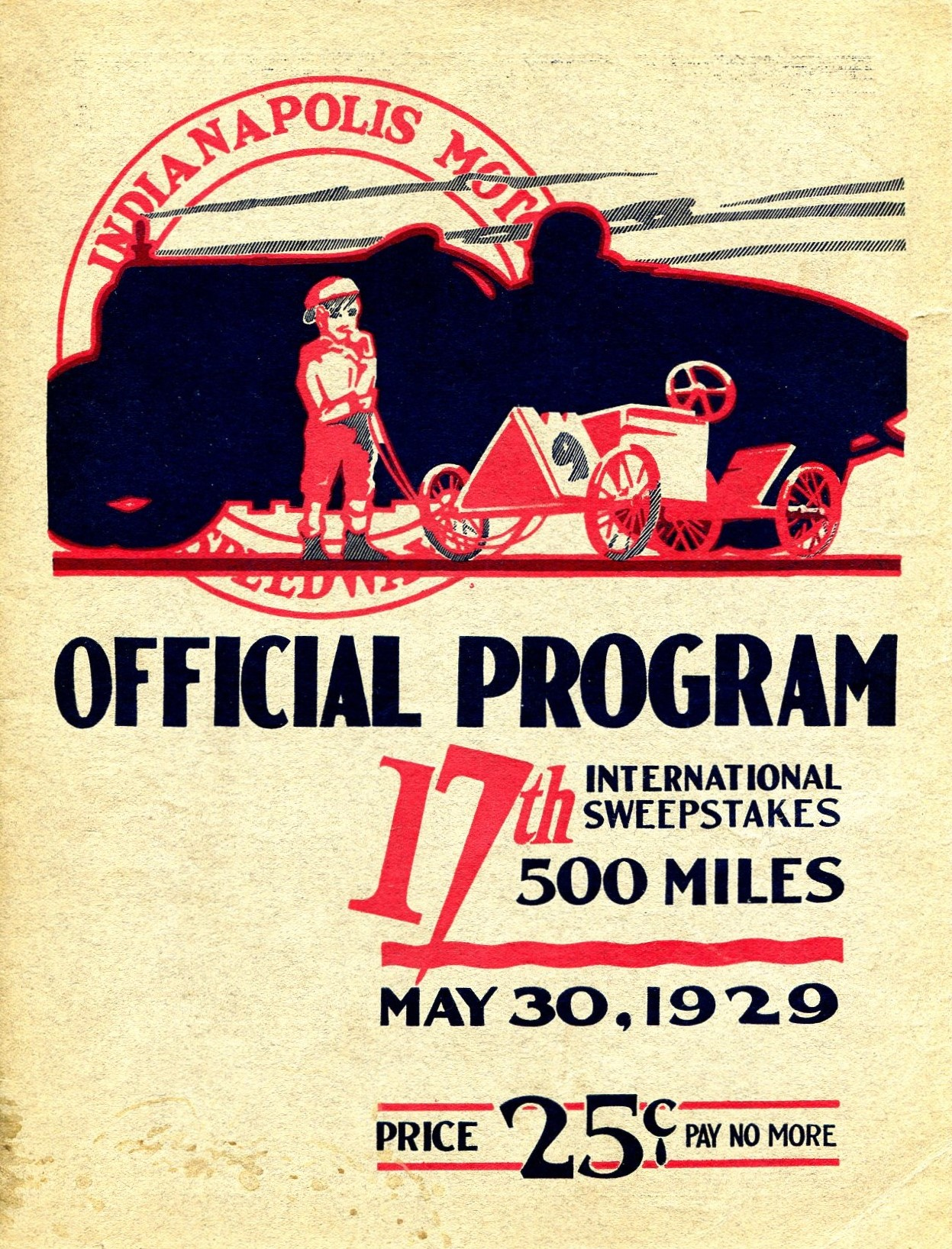

Indianapolis Motor Speedway

Indianapolis 500
- Sanctioning body: AAA
- Date: May 30, 1929
- Winner: Ray Keech
- Winning Entrant: Maude A. Yagle
- Winning Chief Mechanic: Jean Marcenac
- Winning time: 5:07:25.42
- Average speed: 97.585 mph (157.048 km/h)
- Pole position: Cliff Woodbury
- Pole speed: 120.599 mph (194.085 km/h)
- Most laps led: Louis Meyer (65)

Pre-race
- Pace car: Studebaker President Roadster
- Pace car driver: George Hunt
- Starter: Larry P. Fisher
- Honorary referee: Harvey S. Firestone
- Estimated attendance: 160,000

Chronology
Previous	Next
1928	1930

The 17th International 500-Mile Sweepstakes was held at the Indianapolis Motor Speedway on Thursday, May 30, 1929. Ray Keech, who finished fourth a year earlier, took the lead for the final time on lap 158 and won his first Indianapolis 500. Keech won for car owner Maude A. Yagle, the first and to-date, only female winning owner in Indy history. Only two weeks after winning the race, Ray Keech was fatally injured in a crash at Altoona Speedway on June 15, 1929. The race was part of the 1929 AAA Championship Car season.

The 1929 edition was the last contested with the supercharged 91 1/2 cu. in. (1.5 L) displacement engine formula. The supercharged front-wheel drive Miller 8s dominated qualifying, sweeping the front row. A total of twelve front-wheel drive machines made the field, but Keech's rear-wheel-drive Simplex Piston Ring Special took the victory. All three cars of the front row, as well as the first two cars of the second row, dropped out before the halfway point. Pole-sitter Cliff Woodbury crashed on lap 4, and became the first pole position winner in Indy history to finish last (33rd). Defending race winner Louis Meyer was leading in the second half, but lost nearly seven minutes when his car stalled in the pits due to low oil pressure on lap 157. He finished second just over six minutes behind Keech, with the lengthy pit stop the deciding margin.

The hard luck story of the race belonged to Lou Moore. After finishing second in 1928, Moore was on his way to back-to-back runner-up finishes. With two laps to go, however, his engine threw a rod. Due to the rules at the time, since Moore was not running at the finish, he was scored behind all finishers. He fell all the way back to 13th position, behind four cars that actually had fewer laps than he had.

It was the final race of the Roaring Twenties and the final race before the Stock Market crash and Great Depression. The facility was expanded in 1929 to include a golf course. Dubbed the "Speedway Golf Course," it featured nine holes outside the track, and nine holes inside the track, and was designed by Bill Diddel. Also during the month, scenes for the movie Speedway were being filmed.

== Engine specifications and rule changes ==
The 1929 race would be the final year contested with the supercharged 91 1/2 cu. in. (1.5 L) displacement engine formula. Speedway president Eddie Rickenbacker sought to substantially change the engine specifications for 1930 and beyond in an effort to lure back the passenger car manufacturers, and make the cars on the track resemble more those sold to the motoring public. Rickenbacker's desire was to move away from the supercharged, specialized racing machines that had taken over the Speedway through the 1920s.

Contrary to popular belief, the proposed rules changes were not made in response to the stock market crash of 1929 (which had not occurred yet) and the subsequent Great Depression. The rule changes for 1930 were in fact being laid out as early as 1928, and were already approved by the AAA Contest Board in early January 1929. In addition, the 1929 race would be the final for the foreseeable future to be without riding mechanics. From 1930 and beyond, the rules were once again going to mandate two-man cars.

With the 91 1/2 c.i.d engines on their way out, interest was focused on whether the roughly 200 horsepower machines could set a track record for 500 miles in their swan song. Qualifying speeds were expected to be fast.

For 1929, riding mechanics were optional, however, no teams utilized them.

Jimmy Gleason's car carried #53, the first number over 50 in the history of the race.

== Race schedule ==
Participants began arriving at the Speedway in mid-April, but very few, if any, cars took laps prior to May 1. The track was officially made available for practice beginning on Wednesday May 1. Time trials was scheduled for four days – Saturday May 25 through Tuesday May 28. Qualifying on Saturday would be held from 1 p.m. to 5 p.m., and qualifying on Sunday would be held from 11 a.m. to 5 p.m. Time trials for Monday and Tuesday was tentatively scheduled on an as-needed basis, although on Monday, rain would ultimately wash out the day.

Race schedule – May 1929
Sun	Mon	Tue	Wed	Thu	Fri	Sat
			1	2	3	4
5	6	7	8	9	10	11
12	13	14	15	16	17	18
19	20	21	22	23	24	25; Time Trials
26; Time Trials	27; Time Trials	28; Time Trials	29; Carb Day	30; Indy 500	31	

Color	Notes
Green	Track Available for Practice
Dark Blue	Time trials
Silver	Race day
Red	Rained out*
Blank	No track activity

* Includes days where track activity
was significantly limited due to rain

== Preparations – April ==
An expanded garage area greeted competitors arriving at the Speedway for 1929. During the offseason, Speedway superintendent Laurence Welch oversaw the construction of a second row of garages along the Gasoline Alley corridor.

Veteran Indianapolis drivers Earl Devore and Norman Batten were lost at sea in November 1928 in the sinking of the SS Vestris. Batten's widow Marion Batton entered the 1929 race as a car owner.

- Saturday April 6: It was announced that Harry Hartz would attempt to return to racing at the 500, after suffering injuries in a crash at Salem in October 1927. Louis Chiron was named to the Louis Chevrolet entry. Chiron was expected to arrive in Indianapolis early the following week.
- Wednesday April 10: Car owner Maude "M. A." Yagle entered Ray Keech in the Simplex Special. The car was expected to arrive in a few days.
- Friday April 12: European champion Louis Chiron arrived at the Speedway along with two Delage race cars.
- Tuesday April 16: It was announced that Italian driver Gianfranco Comotti would be entered in the 500, driving one of the Talbot entries.
- Saturday April 20: Observers noted that several teams had arrived at the Speedway to begin preparations – more teams than usual at this early stage. Predictions for record speeds were being made, with Dave Evans predicting 102 mph, and mechanic Cotton Henning predicting between 103 and 105 mph.
- Monday April 22: Johnny Seymour of the Earl Cooper team was among those in the garage area preparing cars. Cooper had reportedly been at the Speedway working on race cars all winter, and even running practice laps in the dead of winter in very cold conditions.
- Friday April 26: 1922 race winning riding mechanic Ernie Olson had arrived at the Speedway, working as chief mechanic for Cliff Woodbury at the Boyle Valve team.
- Saturday April 27: To date thirteen entries had been announced for the race, according to Speedway manager T.E. "Pop" Meyers. It was expected that up to 40 entries would be received before the postmarked deadline of May 1. The three-car Packard Cable team owned by Leon Duray announced its second driver. Duray himself had been named to the first car, while Tony Gulotta was named to the second entry. Gulotta was preparing to drive a rear-wheel drive car, while Duray and the unnamed third entry will pilot front-wheel drive machines.

== Practice – May (week 1) ==
- Wednesday May 1: The deadline for entries to be received was midnight on May 1. In addition, any entries postmarked before midnight on May 1 would be accepted. As of April 30, there had been 29 entries received, and Speedway management expected between 6–8 additional entries to arrive before the deadline. Defending race winner Louis Meyer was on the entry list, but three time runner-up Harry Hartz was not. After speculation weeks earlier about returning to racing, Hartz was set to participate only as a team owner. The track was said to be "buzzing" with activity, with preparations getting underway about ten days earlier than years past.
- Thursday May 2: A bevy of late entries poured in before the Wednesday night deadline, as well as by mail on Thursday. As of May 2, the entry list has swelled to 43 cars, the largest since before WWI. Rumors were circulating that Ralph DePalma may drive one of the Duesenberg entries. it was estimated that about half of the car entered were already at the track, or at least in the vicinity. All cars were expected to arrive by May 10.
- Friday May 3: Last-minute entries continued to trickle in, with driver Sam Greco named to the Miller Special owned by Ralph Maramud. The entry list reached 46 cars going for the traditional 33 starting positions.
- Saturday May 4: By the end of the first week, Phil Shafer, Johnny Seymour, and C. H. Cunard, had all been on the track. Increased track activity was expected soon.

== Practice – May (week 2) ==
- Sunday May 5: Billy Arnold ran the fastest practice lap thus far for the year. Arnold's hand-timed lap of 1:17 was equal to an average speed of 116.88 mph. Off the track, Pete DePaolo announced he was coming out of retirement to drive the Boyle Valve entry.
- Monday May 6: Leon Duray was at the track ready to start practice as part of the three-car Packard Cable Special team.
- Tuesday May 7: Speedway officials announced the pace car for the race would be the Studebaker President Roadster, driven by George Hunt, an engineer for Studebaker. On the track, Phil Shafer ran a few laps, topping out at 100 mph, and Myron Stevens was also out taking laps. Jules Moriceau arrived at the track, as did a recovering Harry Hartz and Ralph DePalma. Moriceau was preparing to drive the Thompson Valve Special, while DePalma was entertaining two or three ride offers. Hartz, still recovering from injuries suffered at Salem in 1927, was walking with a cane, and still not ready to race again. Others already in town included Russ Snowberger, who was expected to drive one of Johnny Seymour's Cooper Specials, Johnny Knerr, and Louis Chevrolet.
- Wednesday May 8: Former winners of the "500" that were expected to compete in the 1929 race included defending champion Louis Meyer, Pete DePaolo, and perhaps Ralph DePalma. George Souders was still recovering from injuries, L. L. Corum was working for Stutz, Tommy Milton was attending not as a driver. All other former winners were either deceased or retired from driving. Louis Schneider, Wilbur Shaw, and Dutch Baumann were barred from competing in the 1929 race by the AAA Contest Board as discipline due to participation in "outlaw" dirt races in 1928.
- Thursday May 9: Leon Duray ran a lap of 1:15 (120 mph), the fastest lap thus far for the month. Duray was driving the Packard Cable Special entered for his teammate Ralph Hepburn. Hepburn was expected to arrive at the track on Friday.
- Friday May 10: Harry Hartz took Cliff Durant's Detroit Special for three laps. Hartz best lap was 1:28 (102 mph). Hartz, walking with a cane, climbed in the car Friday evening to shake it down, preparing to possibly drive relief on race day. Also out on the track Friday was Louis Chiron in the Delage entry. Chrion completed 10–12 laps, with a best lap of 1:23 (108.43 mph).
- Saturday May 11: At the end of the second week, overall track activity had not been busy. With just over two weeks left, activity was expected to pick up significantly at the beginning of the next week. Elimination trials for the 33-car field were going to be set with a 90 mph minimum speed, and there were going to be about 12 non-qualifiers.

== Practice – May (week 3) ==
- Sunday May 12: Rain kept the cars off the track for most of the day. About the only track action was Bill Albertson, who ran a few laps in the late afternoon, and Zeke Meyer, who drove a few shakedown laps. Some drivers (Ray Keech, Louis Meyer, and others) left the grounds to race at Cleveland, but they were also rained out.
- Monday May 13: Rain continued into Monday, and washed out track activity for the entire day.
- Tuesday May 14: Leon Duray took to the track for a few laps in the Packard Cable Special around 7:30 p.m. Louis Meyer and Alden Sampson both took laps in the #1 and #44 entries. Also out on the track Tuesday was Bill Spence and Bill Lindau. Hollywood director Harry Beaumont arrived in town, preparing to films scenes for the upcoming silent film Speedway.
- Wednesday May 15: With sunny conditions, the track was busy with activity on Wednesday. Leon Duray had the fastest lap at 115-116 mph. Also taking laps were Louis Meyer, Alden Sampson, Zeke Meyer, Louis Chiron, Jules Moriceau, and Lou Moore.
- Thursday May 16: By the midway point of the month, of the 46 official entries, 17 cars are confirmed to have taken practice laps. About 20-21 additional cars have been spotted in the garage area, but have not taken any laps yet. Approximately 7 more cars have still not arrived at all. With 90 mph set as the minimum speed in the elimination trials, predictions were that it would probably take 100 mph to actually make the field.
- Friday May 17: Pete DePaolo arrived at the track to take his first practice laps. DePaolo completed about ten laps ranging from 103 to 110 mph. Phil Shafer ran many laps, topping out around 108 mph. Bill Lindau ran in excess of 100 mph.
- Saturday 18: Heavy rain moved through the area.

== Practice – May (week 4) ==
- Sunday May 19: The Speedway was closed to the public on Sunday, due to heavy rain that fell on Saturday. The infield was soaked and impassible to spectators. After the puddles of water dried, however, some drivers were able to take laps on the track. A handful of curious spectators viewed from outside the gates. Ralph DePalma signed with the Alden Sampson team (car #44), and took a few laps late Sunday afternoon. Deacon Litz also took laps. After having been rained out the previous weekend, several drivers returned to Cleveland to attempt to make up the race help there. However, it was rained out again and postponed until June. On lighter note, Tom Beall's popular diner inside the garage area ran out of food, and scenes were shot in the garage area for Speedway.
- Monday May 20: The Thompson Valve Special (Jules Moriceau) was taking laps when it apparently suffered mechanical failure – possibly to the universal joint. While track excitement has been "at a low ebb," activity was expected to pick up significantly in preparations for qualifying, set to begin Saturday. More scenes were being shot for Speedway, involving Deacon Litz's car in the garage area.
- Tuesday May 21: With only four days until elimination trials begin, the favorites for the front row were Leon Duray, Cliff Woodbury, and Pete DePaolo. The car of Deacon Litz, which has been borrowed for movie shooting, had been able to see little track time. Relief driver Jack Buxton took it for some practice laps, but a gust of wind blew the engine cover off and it flew over his head. Thane Houser, Ralph DePalma, and one other driver practiced into the evening, until being flagged off due to darkness. It was announced that Pete Kreis was out of a ride in one of the Cooper Specials. Several other rides were being secured by various drivers.
- Wednesday May 22: Ray Keech made his first appearance on the track, turning a lap of about 114 mph. Babe Stapp was also out for a few laps. A day after losing his ride in the Cooper Special, Pete Kreis was named to drive the Detroit Special. Cliff Durant was originally slated to drive the Detroit Special, but decided to step aside. At the Alden Sampson team, Louis Meyer and Ralph DePalma were ready for qualifying, with only some minor carburetion testing slated for Thursday afternoon.
- Thursday May 23: The first incident of the month occurred Thursday afternoon. The car of Fred Winnai broke a steering arm at the exit of turn one. The car slid sideways, but Winnai was able to bring the car to a stop without any contact to the wall. Around the paddock, Leon Duray and Cliff Woodbury were becoming the favorites for the pole position. Upwards of 30 cars reported being ready to qualify on Saturday.
- Friday May 24: At 4 p.m., the first major crash of the month involved Carl Marchese. Coming out of turn two, the car hit a bump and spun down the backstretch, hitting the retaining wall. The car suffered damage to the frame and axles, which would require a couple days to repair. With one day before time trials was to begin, predictions were being made that at least 100–105 mph would be necessary to make the field.

== Time trials ==
Time trials was scheduled for four days – Saturday May 25 through Tuesday May 28. A qualifying run consisted of four laps. Cars were allowed to take as many warm up laps as needed, and when the driver was ready to begin, he would hold his hand up as he came down the frontstretch. The minimum speed to make the field was set at 90 mph.

Car that qualified on the first day lined up in the grid first, with the fastest qualifier on the first day winning the pole position. Cars qualifying on the second, third, and fourth day, regardless of speed, would line up behind the first day qualifiers. No plans were being made to allow any "last-minute" qualifiers on Wednesday, or on race morning. However, in case of weather, the officials would further assess the situation at the close of qualifying Tuesday evening.

=== Saturday May 25 ===
The first day of time trials was held Saturday May 24, scheduled for 1 p.m. to 5 p.m. All cars in the qualifying line at 5 o'clock were allowed to make their attempt, with qualifying continuing until the track closed at sundown. On the morning of time trials, the biggest news out of the paddock was that Ralph DePalma would not attempt to qualify. After signing with the Alden Sampson team a week earlier, DePalma was prohibited from driving by his current employer. Sampson immediately replaced DePalma with Dave Evans, and Evans was expected to take to the track on Sunday.

Qualifying on Saturday saw an upset on the front row. Leon Duray was the favorite for the pole position going into the session. One year prior, Duray set the one-lap (124.018 mph) and four-lap (122.391 mph) track records. Likewise, he also held the U.S. closed-track record (148.1 mph), so he was considered the fastest driver in the field.

Late in the afternoon, Cliff Woodbury took to the track, and tentatively put his car on the top spot. His four-lap average of 120.599 mph, however, was not near a track record. After Woodbury's run, Leon Duray took his Packard Cable Special to the bricks. He took one warm-up lap, returned to the pits for adjustments, then took two more warm-up laps. The next time around he started his run. His first lap was turned at only 120.289 mph, slower than Woodbury's average. Duray was unable to muster any more speed, and settled for second at an average of 119.087 mph.

Also a surprise was Ralph Hepburn who qualified third. Hepburn took the outside of the front row with a run of 116.543 mph. Peter DePaolo's run was mostly a disappointment, as he managed only 5th starting position. Chet Gardner's engine threw a rod and damaged the crankcase. Carl Marchese hit the wall, and would require repairs. Both Gardner and Marchese were expected to attempt to qualify sometime on Monday or Tuesday.

The day ended with fifteen cars qualified. The two slowest cars belonged to foreign drivers Louis Chiron (107.351 mph) and Jules Moriceau (105.609 mph). There was some doubt whether their speeds would hold up to make the starting field. Early predictions had been made that it would take as much as 110 mph to avoid being "crowded out." However, with 18 spots left open and most of the top cars already qualified, the prediction was that any speed over 103 mph was relatively safe.

Pos	No.	Name	Lap 1 (mph)	Lap 2 (mph)	Lap 3 (mph)	Lap 4 (mph)	Average Speed (mph)
1	8	(United States) Cliff Woodbury	120.805	121.408	120.805	119.395	120.599
2	21	(United States) Leon Duray	120.289	119.952	119.554	116.626	119.087
3	18	(United States) Ralph Hepburn	116.445	116.611	117.188	115.935	116.543
4	32	(United States) Babe Stapp	115.488	115.741	115.144	116.099	115.618
5	37	(United States) Peter DePaolo W	114.475	115.771	115.444	114.694	115.093
6	2	(United States) Ray Keech	117.709	114.548	116.641	110.960	114.906
7	9	(United States) Billy Arnold	114.723	115.178	114.344	114.767	114.752
8	1	(United States) Louis Meyer W	114.577	114.957	114.591	114.694	114.704
9	26	(United States) Deacon Litz	112.994	114.884	115.414	114.340	114.526
10	12	(United States) Russ Snowberger	114.068	113.536	113.479	113.407	113.622
11	23	(United States) Tony Gulotta	111.524	111.359	112.754	112.966	112.146
12	10	(United States) Bill Spence R	111.954	111.621	111.649	111.372	111.649
13	3	(United States) Lou Moore	109.836	110.756	110.783	111.345	110.677
14	6	(Monaco) Louis Chiron R	107.168	107.335	107.630	107.271	107.351
15	35	(France) Jules Moriceau R	105.423	105.473	105.758	105.783	105.609

- Source: The Indianapolis News

=== Sunday May 26 ===
The second day of time trials was held on Sunday May 26 from 11 a.m. to 5 p.m. Any cars still in line at 5 o'clock would be able to make an attempt, with the track closing at sundown. Four additional drivers completed runs, filling the field to 19 cars. A total of 14 spots were still open. Of the 19 cars qualified, a total of 17 broke the 110 mph barrier, and all-time record for time trials at Indianapolis at the time.

Johnny Seymour (114.307 mph) was the fastest driver of the day, posting the 10th-fastest speed overall. However, as a second day qualifier, he would line up 16th on the starting grid.

Pos	No.	Name	Lap 1 (mph)	Lap 2 (mph)	Lap 3 (mph)	Lap 4 (mph)	Average Speed (mph)
16	38	(United States) Johnny Seymour	114.591	114.446	114.315	113.881	114.307
17	4	(United States) Pete Kreis	112.150	112.346	113.208	112.416	112.528
18	17	(United States) Phil Shafer	111.566	112.136	111.495	111.359	111.628
19	5	(United States) Bob McDonogh	110.633	112.094	111.718	112.024	111.614

- Source: The Indianapolis News

=== Monday May 27 ===
Rain washed out qualifying on Monday May 27. Seven cars announced their intentions to get in the qualifying line, but the only track activity was practice runs. Late in the afternoon, Myron Stevens hit a bump in turn one, which veered the car to the inside wall. The car bounced off the retaining wall and back onto the track surface. Stevens was thrown from the machine as it flipped end-over-end. Stevens was checked out at the hospital and suffered only superficial injuries.

=== Tuesday May 28 ===
The fourth and final day of time trials was held on Tuesday May 28. The day started with fourteen spots open on the grid. Officials announced that if the field filled to 33 cars by the end of the day, there would be no further qualifying. A total of sixteen cars took to the track, and the starting grid was set.

Rain hampered most of the day. Two cars completed runs around noon, then rain resumed. At 4 p.m., the rain stopped, and the 24 cars in the qualifying line would be sent in until darkness. Ernie Triplett (114.789 mph) was the fastest driver of the day. Two drivers failed to qualify. Bill Lindau was "crowded out" (bumped) by Cliff Bergere, and rookie Frank Swigart (99.585 mph) was too slow. Two additional drivers, Zeke Meyer and Sam Grecco, tried to qualify in total darkness, but were too slow and officials flagged them off the track.

Pos	No.	Name	Lap 1 (mph)	Lap 2 (mph)	Lap 3 (mph)	Lap 4 (mph)	Average Speed (mph)	Notes
20	47	(United States) Ernie Triplett R	115.340	115.031	114.271	114.518	114.789	
21	42	(United States) Freddie Winnai R	113.622	114.416	113.679	113.852	113.892	
23	34	(United States) Fred Frame	111.885	111.956	111.359	111.132	111.328	
22	44	(United States) Phil Pardee	110.906	111.718	111.056	111.166	111.211	Car withdrawn May 29
24	53	(United States) Jimmy Gleason	110.552	109.720	110.321	110.783	110.345	
25	49	(United States) Wesley Crawford R	108.538	106.509	109.356	110.092	108.607	
26	43	(United States) Carl Marchese R	108.238	108.108	108.761	108.656	108.440	
27	36	(United States) Frank Farmer R	107.720	107.656	108.669	107.849	107.972	
28	31	(United States) Herman Schurch R	106.749	107.501	108.134	107.411	107.477	
29	48	(United States) Speed Gardner R	105.945	107.733	105.659	104.651	105.985	
30	28	(United States) Frank Brisko R	105.202	106.270	105.945	106.020	105.857	
31	29	(United States) Rick Decker R	105.275	105.436	105.300	105.126	105.285	
32	27	(United States) Bert Karnatz R	106.597	106.232	104.493	101.810	104.749	
33	25	(United States) Cliff Bergere	106.358	102.845	102.939	102.693	103.687	
DNQ	46	(United States) Bill Lindau R					102.509	Bumped by Bergere
DNQ		(United States) Frank Swigart R					99.585	Too Slow
DNQ	45	(United States) Sam Grecco R					N/A	Flagged due to darkness
DNQ	16	(United States) Zeke Meyer R					N/A	Flagged due to darkness

- Source: The Indianapolis News

== Starting grid ==
The track was closed Wednesday morning (May 29) for track cleaning. The final "Carburation Day" practice session was held Wednesday afternoon. Phil Pardee crashed in turn three, and was sent to the hospital with slight injuries. Pardee's car was too damaged to race and was withdrawn. Officials elevated Bill Lindau, the first alternate, to 33rd starting position.

Row	Inside	Middle	Outside
1	(United States) Cliff Woodbury	(United States) Leon Duray	(United States) Ralph Hepburn
2	(United States) Babe Stapp	(United States) Peter DePaolo (W)	(United States) Ray Keech
3	(United States) Billy Arnold	(United States) Louis Meyer (W)	(United States) Deacon Litz
4	(United States) Russ Snowberger	(United States) Tony Gulotta	(United States) Bill Spence (R)
5	(United States) Lou Moore	(Monaco) Louis Chiron (R)	(France) Jules Moriceau (R)
6	(United States) Johnny Seymour	(United States) Pete Kreis	(United States) Phil Shafer
7	(United States) Bob McDonogh	(United States) Ernie Triplett (R)	(United States) Freddie Winnai (R)
8	(United States) Fred Frame	(United States) Jimmy Gleason	(United States) Wesley Crawford (R)
9	(United States) Carl Marchese (R)	(United States) Frank Farmer (R)	(United States) Herman Schurch (R)
10	(United States) Speed Gardner (R)	(United States) Frank Brisko (R)	(United States) Rick Decker (R)
11	(United States) Bert Karnatz (R)	(United States) Cliff Bergere	(United States) Bill Lindau (R)

=== Cars withdrawn ===
- Phil Pardee R – Car withdrawn May 29 due to practice crash

=== Alternates ===
- First alternate: Bill Lindau R – Elevated to the starting field May 29
- Second alternate: Frank Sweigert R – Elevated to first alternate May 29

=== Failed to qualify ===
- Sam Grecco (#45) – Incomplete qualifying run due to darkness
- Zeke Meyer (#16) – Incomplete qualifying run due to darkness
- Myron Stevens (#33) – Practice crash
- Chet Gardner (#19) – Connecting rod
- Thane Houser (#41) – Broken supercharger drive
- Ralph DePalma (#44) – Withdrew
- Gianfranco Comotti (#57) – Withdrew
- Joe Baker (#51) – Car not ready
- Ralph S. Miller (#55) – Car not ready
- Henry Turgeon (#56) – Car not ready
- Bob Robinson (#24) – Car not ready
- Steve Smith (#52) – Car not ready
- Cliff Durant (#4)
- John Vance (#51)
- C. H. Cunard (#47)
- Dave Evans
- Ira Hall
- Jim Hill
- Bill Albertson
- Ray Smith

== Race summary ==
The race began at 10 a.m. with George Hunt driving the Studebaker President Roadster pace car. Theodore "Pop" Meyers rode as a passenger in the pace car. Among the notable guests and celebrities in attendance were Governor Harry G. Leslie, Glenn Curtiss, Horace E. Dodge, Harvey S. Firestone, William S. Knudsen, and Ray Harroun. In addition, former Speedway president Carl G. Fisher was on hand. William Haines, Anita Page, Ernest Torrence, and Karl Dane were on hand, as filming continued on the film Speedway.

During the pace lap, Ralph Hepburn's car stalled. His crew was able to push-start the car, and he caught up to re-join the field. The pace lap was run at about 60-70 mph, and the field was released for the start.

=== Start ===
Leon Duray took the lead from the middle of the front row. On lap 4, pole-sitter Cliff Woodbury suffered a failure in the right rear wheel. In turn three, the car skidded, then spun in turn four, backing the car into the outside wall, punching a section of the wall down. Woodbury became the first driver in Indy history to start on the pole position and finish last (33rd). Woodbury was credited with only 3 laps completed, but was uninjured, and immediately returned to the pits to drive relief for other cars.

Leon Duray led the first seven laps, with Ray Keech second. The pace was about 109 mph. On lap 8, Deacon Litz was running third behind Duray and Keech when he realized his hand-brake had fallen off. Barreling down the backstretch, Litz veered to the inside apron to avoid crashing and possibly collecting the two other leaders. He skidded by both Duray and Keech, gathered control, and remarkably was able to take the lead cleanly. Litz was quickly able to adapt, and started pulling out to a sizable lead.

On lap 10, Bill Spence crashed in turn two. Spence had already been in the pits to change out all eight spark plugs. The car hit the wall and turned over several times and Spence was thrown from the cockpit. He was taken unconscious from the track, but died en route to the hospital from a fractured skull. It was the first fatal accident to occur during the race in ten years.

=== First half ===
After troubles on the pace lap, Ralph Hepburn (running as high as second) dropped out on lap 14 with transmission trouble. Ray Keech made a 30-second pit stop to change a right rear tire on lap 21, and fell back to tenth position. Back out on the track, Keech began charging to catch up to the leaders.

Attrition took a huge toll on the field in the first 75 laps. Peter DePaolo dropped out with a broken steering knuckle, and Babe Stapp suffered a broken universal joint. By lap 65, seven of the top ten qualifiers were out – including all of the top five qualifiers. Jules Moriceau crashed in turn three after completing 30 laps. He spun around four times, hitting the wall each time, then bounced back across the track. The car came to rest pointing forward, and was towed back to the pits. Moriceau was not injured, and walked back to the pits planning to drive relief.

Deacon Litz continued to set the pace until lap 56. Lou Moore was in second, followed by Leon Duray, and Ray Keech. Billy Arnold and Tony Gulotta were also running in the top five. At the 100-mile mark (40 laps), Litz set a record average speed of 107.17 mph. After his early crash, Cliff Woodbury was already back behind the wheel around lap 30, driving relief for Billy Arnold. Arnold came to the pits with broken goggles and a cut eye, and needed relief while his injuries were tended to.

Deacon Litz dropped out while leading with a broken rod on lap 56. According to Litz, "something the size of a brick" exploded out of the side of the crankcase. That handed the lead to Lou Moore. Running in second was now Louis Meyer. Moore and Meyer traded time in the lead until the halfway point.

=== Second half ===
Barney Kleopfer took over as relief driver for Lou Moore for the second half. Ray Keech and Louis Meyer, however, would go the distance without relief help. Ray Keech made his second and final pit stop on lap 109. The team changed three tires and refueled in just over three minutes.

Fred Frame led eleven laps at the halfway point. Frame's challenge at the front of the field was short-lived, and he eventually fell back and finished 10th. Louis Meyer took the lead once again on lap 109, and led until lap 157. With Meyer leading, Keech second, and Kleopfer (driving for Moore) third, car numbers #1, #2, and #3 were running 1st-2nd-3rd.

Louis Meyer came to the pits on lap 157, but had a disastrous seven-minute pit stop. The engine stalled and the crew worked diligently on the carburetor to get him back out on the track. By the time he got back in the race, he had fallen to third place. Ray Keech was now firmly in control with Kleopfer (driving for Moore) in second.

=== Finish ===
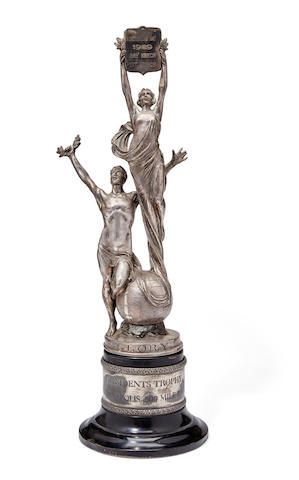
The Indianapolis 500 winner's trophy awarded to Ray Keech

In the closing laps, Ray Keech led Barney Kleopfer (driving for Lou Moore). Louis Meyer was charging hard in third place, desperate to make up for lost time in the pits. The Kleopfer car was running low on oil, and sputtering. Keech held a lead of about 1 minute and 14 seconds with ten laps to go. Third place was another 4 minutes behind. The rest of the field was many laps down.

While Keech cruised to victory, the race now came down to who was going to finish second. Barney Kleopfer pulled Lou Moore's car into the pits with two laps to go. The engine was clanking, suffering from burned out bearings. Lou Moore got back in the car, attempting to nurse the final two laps out of the machine. Still holding a lead of at least a few minutes over third place, he was able to crank the car one more time, and pulled away. He only got as far as turn two, and the engine threw a rod down the backstretch. Due to the rules at the time, all cars that were running at the finish were ranked ahead of cars that dropped out, regardless of total lap count. Since Moore was not running at the finish, he was scored behind all finishers. He fell all the way back to 13th position, behind three cars that actually had fewer laps than he had. But more frustrating for Moore was the loss of over $12,000 in prize money. His lap prize money $2,200 and 13th place purse of $462 was of little consolation.

Ray Keech took home a purse of $31,350 for the victory. A hard-charging Louis Meyer snatched second place after the Moore car's misfortunes. Meyer finished 6 minutes and 24 second behind, and collected $20,400.

Jimmy Gleason finished third, nursing a sore ankle from an injury the previous fall. After suffering a crash in practice just before time trials, Carl Marchese came home fourth. After showing strength in qualifying, the only front-wheel drive car to go the distance belonged to Cliff Bergere, credited with 9th place. The final few laps were also dramatic for Billy Arnold. After suffering a cut eye early in the going, Arnold was back in the car for the finish, but ran out of gas on lap 196. One of his mechanics ran to his aid with a gas can, and Arnold was able to finish. The delay, however, cost Arnold two positions, and he dropped from 6th to 8th in the final standings.

Sources: The Indianapolis News

== Box score ==
Finish	Start	No	Name	Entrant	Car	Qual	Laps	Status
1	6	2	(United States) Ray Keech	M. A. Yagle	Miller	114.905	200	97.585 mph
2	8	1	(United States) Louis Meyer W	Alden Sampson II	Miller	114.709	200	+6:23.79
3	23	53	(United States) Jimmy Gleason (Thane Houser Laps 79–90) (Ernie Triplett Laps 91–146)	A. S. Duesenberg	Duesenberg	110.345	200	+12:45.04
4	25	43	(United States) Carl Marchese R	Marchese Brothers	Miller	108.440	200	+13:17.53
5	21	42	(United States) Freddie Winnai R (L. L. Corum Laps 96–99) (Roscoe Ford Laps 100–176)	A. S. Duesenberg	Duesenberg	113.892	200	+30:26.63
6	28	48	(United States) Speed Gardner R (Chet Gardner Laps 32–82) (Chet Gardner Laps 97-200)	F. P. Cramer	Miller	105.985	200	+31:58.85
7	14	6	(Monaco) Louis Chiron R	Louis Chiron	Delage	107.351	200	+34:32.43
8	7	9	(United States) Billy Arnold (Cliff Woodbury Laps 31–36) (Fred Roberts Laps 37–146)	Cliff R. Woodbury	Miller	114.752	200	+50:06.35
9	32	25	(United States) Cliff Bergere (Pete Kreis Laps 94–146)	Cliff Bergere	Miller	103.687	200	+1:04:18.58
10	22	34	(United States) Fred Frame (Johnny Seymour Laps 143–193)	Cooper Engineering Company	Cooper–Miller	111.328	193	Flagged
11	29	28	(United States) Frank Brisko R	Frank Brisko	Miller	105.857	180	Flagged
12	18	17	(United States) Phil Shafer (Cliff Woodbury Laps 102–105) (Russ Snowberger Laps 114–118)	Phil Shafer	Miller	111.628	150	Flagged
13	13	3	(United States) Lou Moore (Barney Kleopfer Laps 93–198)	Charles Haase	Miller	110.677	198	Rod
14	26	36	(United States) Frank Farmer R (Bill Albertson Laps 119–134)	William Albertson	Miller	107.972	140	Supercharger
15	24	49	(United States) Wesley Crawford R (Ted Simpson Laps 28–53) (Zeke Meyer Laps 54–107) (Ted Simpson Laps 108–126) (Dave Evans Laps 127)	Marian Batten	Fengler–Miller	108.607	127	Carburetor
16	17	4	(United States) Pete Kreis	Tommy Milton	Detroit–Miller	112.528	91	Engine seized
17	11	23	(United States) Tony Gulotta	Leon Duray	Miller	112.146	91	Supercharger
18	19	5	(United States) Bob McDonogh	M. R. Dodds	Miller	111.614	74	Oil tank
19	33	46	(United States) Bill Lindau R	Painter & Hufnagle	Miller	102.509	70	Valve
20	27	31	(United States) Herman Schurch R (Jack Buxton Laps 60–68) (Bert Karnatz Laps 69–70)	Fred Schneider	Miller	107.477	70	Gas tank split
21	16	38	(United States) Johnny Seymour	Cooper Engineering Company	Cooper–Miller	114.307	65	Rear axle
22	2	21	(United States) Leon Duray (Ralph Hepburn Laps 45–65)	Leon Duray	Miller	119.087	65	Carburetor
23	30	29	(United States) Rick Decker R (Jimmy Rossi Laps 45–56)	Rickliffe Decker	Miller	105.288	61	Supercharger
24	9	26	(United States) Deacon Litz	A. B. Litz	Miller	114.526	56	Rod
25	31	27	(United States) Bert Karnatz R	Reed & Mulligan	Miller	104.749	50	Gas leak
26	20	47	(United States) Ernie Triplett R	C. H. Cunard	Duesenberg	114.789	48	Rod
27	10	12	(United States) Russ Snowberger	Cooper Engineering Company	Cooper–Miller	113.622	45	Supercharger
28	4	32	(United States) Babe Stapp	William S. White	Duesenberg–Miller	115.618	40	Universal joint
29	15	35	(France) Jules Moriceau R	Thompson Products, Inc.	Amilcar	105.609	30	Crash T4
30	5	37	(United States) Peter DePaolo W	Cliff R. Woodbury	Miller	115.093	25	Steering
31	3	18	(United States) Ralph Hepburn	Leon Duray	Miller	116.543	14	Transmission
32	12	10	(United States) Bill Spence R ✝	A. S. Duesenberg	Duesenberg	111.649	9	Died in crash at T2
33	1	8	(United States) Cliff Woodbury	Cliff R. Woodbury	Miller	120.599	3	Crash T3

Note: Relief drivers in parentheses

W Former Indianapolis 500 winner

R Indianapolis 500 Rookie

=== Race statistics ===
Lap Leaders
Laps	Leader
1–7	Leon Duray
8–56	Deacon Litz
57–60	Lou Moore
61	Louis Meyer
62–79	Lou Moore
80–94	Louis Meyer
95–105	Fred Frame
106–108	Ray Keech
109–157	Louis Meyer
158–200	Ray Keech

Total laps led
Leader	Laps
Louis Meyer	65
Deacon Litz	49
Ray Keech	46
Lou Moore	22
Fred Frame	11
Leon Duray	7

== Broadcasting ==
The race was carried live on radio on WKBF-AM, in a partnership arranged with the Indianapolis News. The broadcast began at 9:30 a.m. local time, and was five and a half hours in duration. It was the fifth consecutive year the race was being carried on the radio through this format. WFBM also picked up the broadcast.

The broadcast originated from the Pagoda, with microphones also set up in the pit area. The booth announcing staff included Chris Albion and John H. Heiney. John Mannix and a crew of four assistants handled the pit duties, and William F. Sturm was on hand to offer race summaries.

At 2 p.m., NBC came on air for live national coverage of the final hour of the race. Anchor Graham McNamee's call was picked up on WKBF and 47 other NBC affiliates across the country.

== Legacy ==
Ray Keech reigned as Indianapolis 500 champion for only 17 days. He would be fatally injured in a crash at Altoona Speedway on June 15, 1929. Keech joined Gaston Chevrolet and Joe Boyer (and later George Robson and Dan Wheldon) as Indy 500 winners who were killed in racing accidents the same year as their Indy victory.

Despite the predictions of record speeds, the final race contested with the 91.5 cubic inch "specialized" racing machines failed to set records in either qualifying or the race. Peter DePaolo's 1924 race record (101.127 mph) would stand for another three years. The one-lap qualifying record (124.018 mph) set by Leon Duray in 1928 would also stand for nearly a decade until it fell.

== Notes ==
=== Works cited ===
- Indianapolis 500 History: Race & All-Time Stats – Official Site

=== References ===
1928 Indianapolis 500; Louis Meyer	1929 Indianapolis 500; Ray Keech	1930 Indianapolis 500; Billy Arnold
