= Bill Lindau =

American racing driver (1903–1989)

- Born: William Lindau; January 2, 1903 Pittsburgh, Pennsylvania, U.S.
- Died: December 18, 1989 (aged 86) Pittsburgh, Pennsylvania, U.S.

Champ Car career
- 2 races run over 2 years
- First race: 1929 Indianapolis 500 (Indianapolis)
- Last race: 1929 Altoona 200 #1 (Altoona)
Wins	Podiums	Poles
0	0	0

William Lindau (January 2, 1903 – December 18, 1989) was an American racing driver. He competed in two AAA Championship Car races, the 1929 Indianapolis 500 and a race the next month on the board oval in Altoona, Pennsylvania. He failed to finish both races.

== Motorsports career results ==
=== Indianapolis 500 results ===
Year	Car	Start	Qual	Rank	Finish	Laps	Led	Retired
1929	46	33	102.509	33	19	70	0	Valve
Totals						70	0	

Starts	1
Poles	0
Front Row	0
Wins	0
Top 5	0
Top 10	0
Retired	1
