= Deacon Litz =

American racing driver (1897–1967)

- Born: Artha Benson Litz; August 2, 1897 DuBois, Pennsylvania, U.S.
- Died: January 3, 1967 (aged 69) Daytona Beach, Florida, U.S.

Champ Car career
- 32 races run over 14 years
- Best finish: 5th (1930)
- First race: 1928 Indianapolis 500 (Indianapolis)
- Last race: 1941 Indianapolis 500 (Indianapolis)
Wins	Podiums	Poles
0	5	1

Artha Benson "Deacon" Litz (August 2, 1897 – January 3, 1967) was an American racing driver active primarily during the 1920s and 1930s.

== Personal life ==
Litz was a hotel-keeper by trade, and was said to weigh 224 pounds.

Due to his fame as a racecar driver, Litz appeared in the 1929 silent film Speedway.

== Racing career ==
Litz started racing with his own home-made car on dirt tracks at county fairs soon after World War I. He began his professional career in 1927 and appeared in the 1929 silent film, Speedway, as an auto racer.

Litz was a star when the Duesenberg and Miller racing cars dominated the tracks. He participated in many well-known races throughout his career, including the Indianapolis 500 and the Vanderbilt Cup.

Litz's best finish at the Indianapolis 500 was placing fourth in 1934. Litz was the first person to apply to be in the 1935 Indianapolis 500, putting in his application six months before the race date. He was a 12-time starter at the Indianapolis 500. Litz was inducted into the Auto Racing Hall of Fame in 1964.

Litz retired from the sport after his last Indianapolis 500 race in 1941. Litz was noted for being an excellent speaker regarding the sport of speedway racing after his retirement. Litz died in Daytona Beach, Florida, in 1967.

== Motorsports career results ==
=== Indianapolis 500 results ===
Year	Car	Start	Qual	Rank	Finish	Laps	Led	Retired
1928	23	17	106.213	23	14	161	0	Flagged
1929	26	9	114.526	10	24	56	49	Rod
1930	12	31	105.755	8	30	22	0	Crash T3
1931	5	4	111.531	7	17	177	0	Crash T1
1932	24	19	109.546	31	18	152	0	Rod
1933	26	14	113.138	17	16	197	0	Flagged
1934	12	19	113.731	14	4	200	0	Running
1935	16	13	114.488	18	8	200	0	Running
1936	15	26	115.997	13	23	108	0	Crankshaft
1937	35	11	116.372	33	14	191	0	Out of oil
1939	53	31	117.979	31	33	7	0	Valve
1941	32	29	123.440	15	22	89	0	Oil trouble
Totals						1560	49	

Starts	12
Poles	0
Front Row	0
Wins	0
Top 5	1
Top 10	2
Retired	8
