= Carl Marchese =

American racing driver (1905–1984)

- Born: November 17, 1905 Milwaukee, Wisconsin, U.S.
- Died: June 26, 1984 (aged 78) Valrico, Florida, U.S.

Champ Car career
- 1 race run over 1 year
- First race: 1929 Indianapolis 500 (Indianapolis)
Wins	Podiums	Poles
0	0	0

Carl Marchese (November 17, 1905 – June 26, 1984) was an American racing driver who competed in the 1929 Indianapolis 500. He was later an Indianapolis 500 car owner, entering his own Marchese chassis into the 1950 and 1951 races. He was elected to the Wisconsin Athletic Hall of Fame in 1977.

== Motorsports career results ==
=== Indianapolis 500 results ===
Year	Car	Start	Qual	Rank	Finish	Laps	Led	Retired
1929	43	25	108.440	23	4	200	0	Running
Totals						200	0	

Starts	1
Poles	0
Front Row	0
Wins	0
Top 5	1
Top 10	1
Retired	0

=== Indianapolis 500 results of cars constructed by Marchese ===
Season	Driver	Grid	Classification	Points	Note	Race Report
1950	Myron Fohr	16	11			Report
1951	Chuck Stevenson	19	20		Fire	Report
