= Freddie Winnai =

American racing driver (1905–1977)

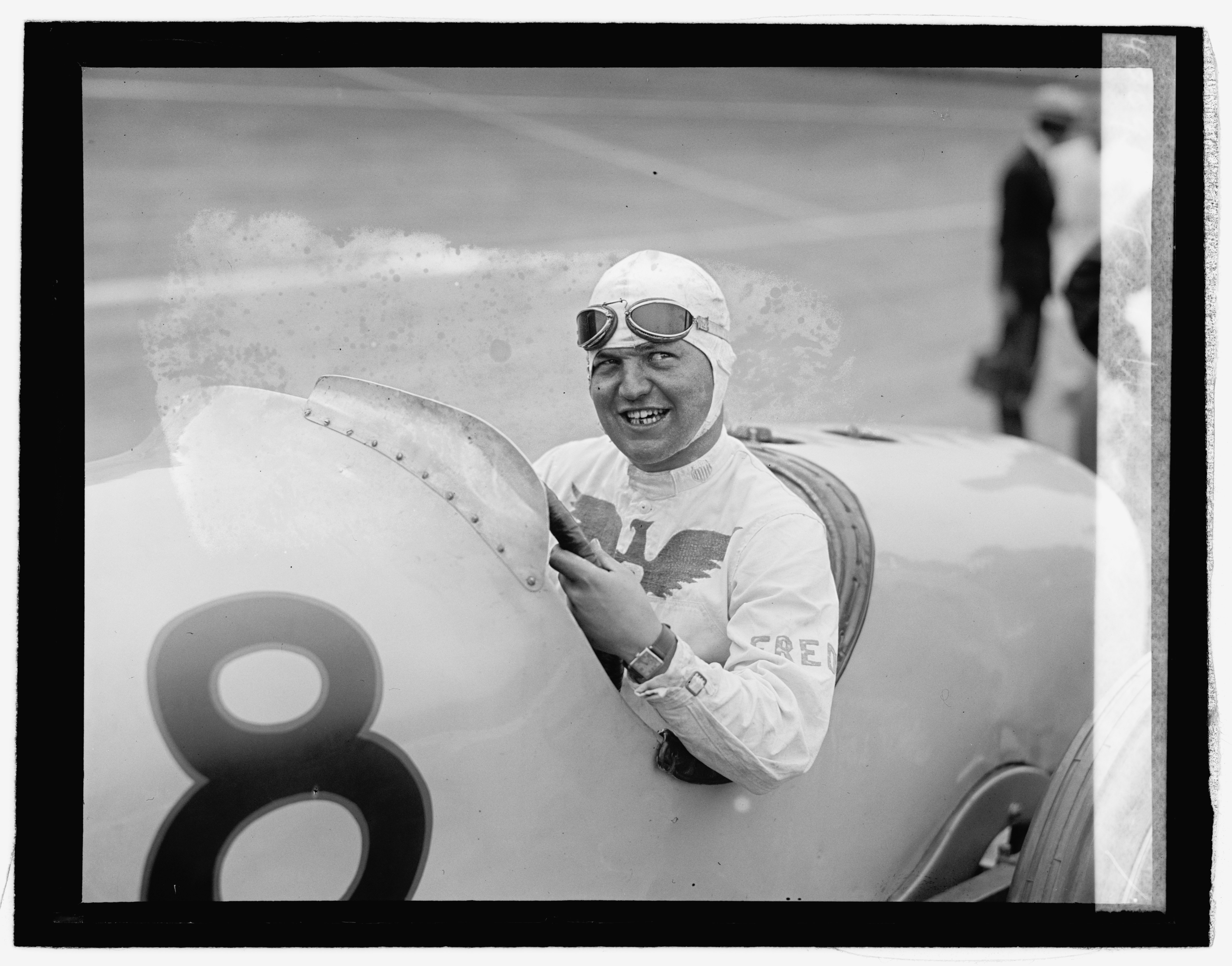
- Born: Freddie Louis Winnai; April 8, 1905 Philadelphia, Pennsylvania, U.S.
- Died: September 4, 1977 (aged 72) Philadelphia, Pennsylvania, U.S.

Champ Car career
- 12 races run over 10 years
- Best finish: 7th (1929)
- First race: 1929 Indianapolis 500 (Indianapolis)
- Last race: 1936 Indianapolis 500 (Indianapolis)
Wins	Podiums	Poles
0	2	0

Freddie Louis Winnai (April 8, 1905 – September 4, 1977) was an American racing driver during the AAA Indy car era.

== Motorsports career results ==
=== Indianapolis 500 results ===
Year	Car	Start	Qual	Rank	Finish	Laps	Led	Retired
1929	42	21	113.892	12	5	200	0	Running
1931	24	28	105.899	26	29	60	0	Crash NC
1932	65	35	108.755	36	8	200	0	Running
1933	65	35	111.018	26	27	125	0	Engine trouble
1935	27	28	115.138	14	31	16	0	Rod
1936	35	12	116.221	10	11	199	0	Flagged
Totals						800	0	

Starts	6
Poles	0
Front Row	0
Wins	0
Top 5	1
Top 10	2
Retired	3
