= Thane Houser =

American racing driver (1891–1967)

- Born: Thane Eli Houser; July 27, 1891 Honey Creek, Indiana, U.S.
- Died: November 23, 1967 (aged 76) Columbus, Indiana, U.S.

Champ Car career
- 2 races run over 2 years
- Best finish: 25th (1929)
- First race: 1926 Indianapolis 500 (Indianapolis)
- Last race: 1926 Independence Day Classic (Rockingham Park)
Wins	Podiums	Poles
0	0	0

Thane Eli Houser (July 27, 1891 – November 23, 1967) was an American racing driver. He was the father of fellow driver Norm Houser.

Primarily a car builder and mechanic as well as a riding mechanic, Houser served as a relief driver in the 1923 Indianapolis 500 and 1924 Indianapolis 500 races for Wade Morton and Joe Boyer, respectively. He drove a Miller in the 1926 race and finished 13th in the rain-shortened event. In July of that year he made his only other Championship Car start at Rockingham Speedway in New Hampshire and finished 18th after being black-flagged 15 laps in. His attempt to qualify for the 1929 Indianapolis 500 was thwarted by a broken supercharger on his Duesenberg, but he served as relief driver for Jimmy Gleason for eleven laps. Gleason would go on to finish third in the race.

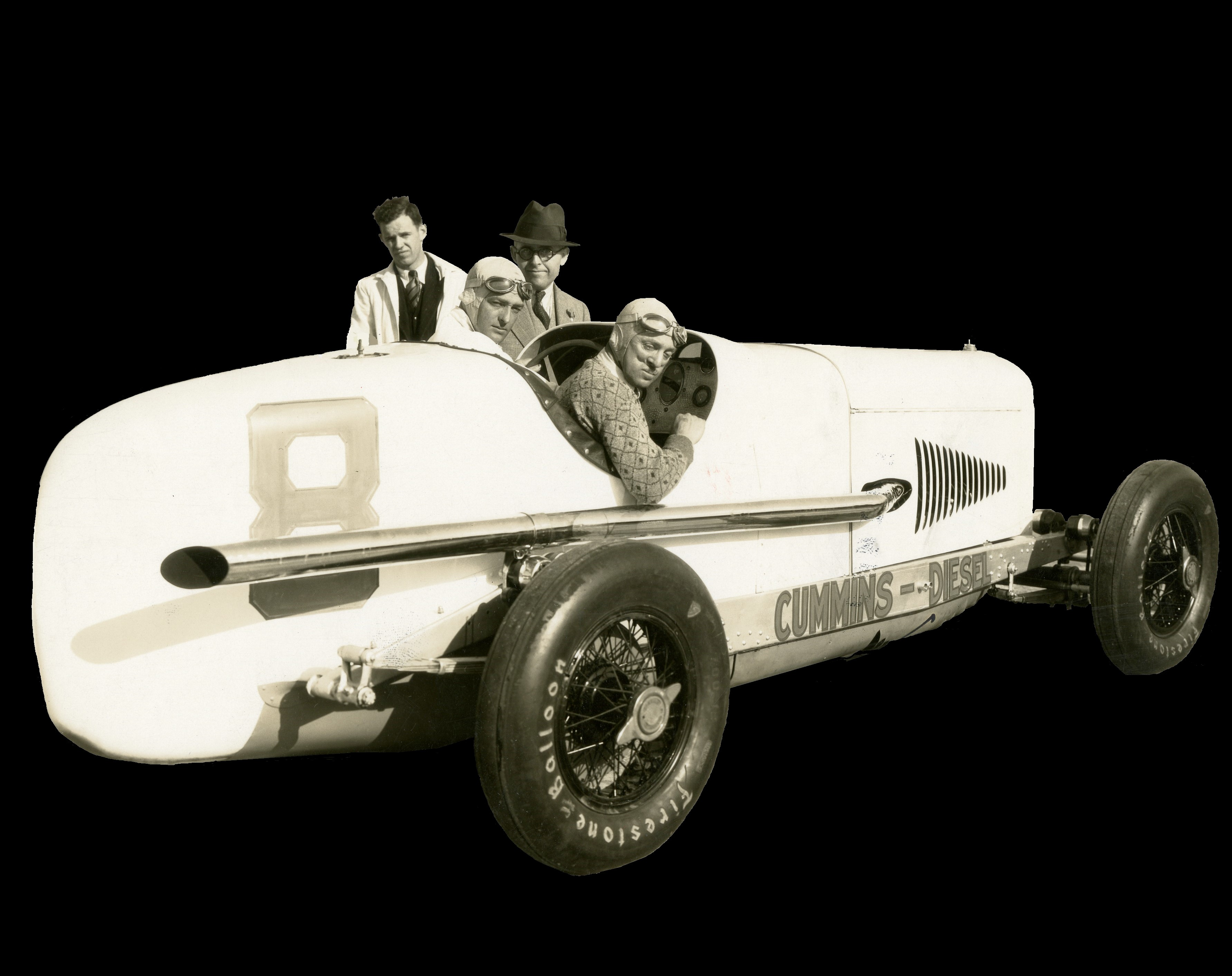
Houser (right), Riding Mechanic; Dave Evans, Driver; Clessie Cummins (at right in background), with the Cummins-powered race car in the 1931 Indianapolis 500

In 1931, Houser had the honor of being the Riding Mechanic for Dave Evans in the Clessie Cummins Diesel #8 at the Indianapolis Motor Speedway (see photo, below). 1931 was the first year for the Diesel at Indianapolis. The Diesel was the slowest qualifier, but started 17th on the grid of 40 cars. They completed the race with no pit stops and finished in 13th position.

== Motorsports career results ==
=== Indianapolis 500 results ===
Year	Car	Start	Qual	Rank	Finish	Laps	Led	Retired
1926	33	21	93.672	22	13	102	0	Flagged
Totals						102	0	

Starts	1
Poles	0
Front Row	0
Wins	0
Top 5	0
Top 10	0
Retired	0
