= Cliff Woodbury =

American racing driver (1894–1984)

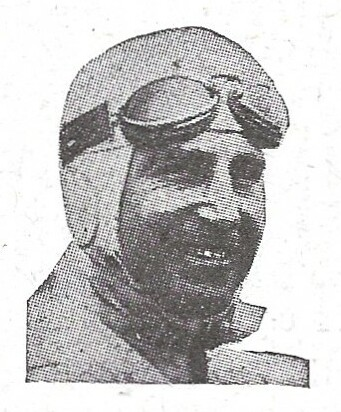
- Born: Clifford Ray Woodbury; July 8, 1894 Blue Island, Illinois, U.S.
- Died: November 13, 1984 (aged 90) Alton, Illinois, U.S.

Champ Car career
- 37 races run over 4 years
- Best finish: 5th (1929)
- First race: 1926 Culver City 250 (Culver City)
- Last race: 1929 Altoona 200 #1 (Altoona)
- First win: 1928 International Motor Classic (Rockingham Park)
- Last win: 1929 Detroit 100 (Detroit)
Wins	Podiums	Poles
2	10	5

Clifford Ray Woodbury (July 8, 1894 – November 13, 1984) was an American racing driver. Woodbury raced all over the U.S. during one of the most dangerous times in motorsports.

Woodbury was born near Chicago, Illinois. He started his career about 1915 running in state fairs across the Midwest in his Duesenberg, winning purses that sometimes amounted to more than $500. In 1921 and 1922, he worked with Ruth Law Oliver with her barnstorming Flying Circus which paired a race car and bi-plane. The highlight of the show was when a female daredevil would climb a ladder from the Woodbury's race car to the plane while both were racing around the track.

Woodbury was a popular local hero at the motor sports tracks in Chicago and appeared often in The Chicago Tribune with his Fronty Ford. AAA named Woodbury the Dirt Tack Champion of the Nation in 1924, 1925 and 1926.

In 1926, Woodbury joined Mike Boyle's Boyle Valve Racing Team and began his career on board tracks driving supercharged Millers. Woodbury finished third on his first attempt at the Indianapolis 500 in 1926 and set the pole in qualifying in 1929. Woodbury also set the one mile (1.6 km) record at Daytona Beach in 1930 with a run of 180.90 mph (291.13 km/h) Woodbury retired after a severe wreck in Altoona, Pennsylvania in June 1929 which killed the 1929 Indianapolis 500 winner, Ray Keech.

After retirement, Woodbury established a successful auto repair business "Woodbury Bros" with his brother Elmer which was based in Chicago. He died in 1984 in Alton, Illinois.

== Motorsports career results ==
=== Indianapolis 500 results ===
Year	Car	Start	Qual	Rank	Finish	Laps	Led	Retired
1926	36	14	105.109	10	3	158	0	Flagged
1927	15	6	113.200	7	19	108	0	Supercharger
1928	10	2	120.418	2	23	55	0	Timing gears
1929	8	1	120.599	1	33	3	0	Crash T3
Totals						324	0	

Starts	4
Poles	1
Front Row	2
Wins	0
Top 5	1
Top 10	1
Retired	3
