= Ray Keech =

American racing driver (1900–1929)

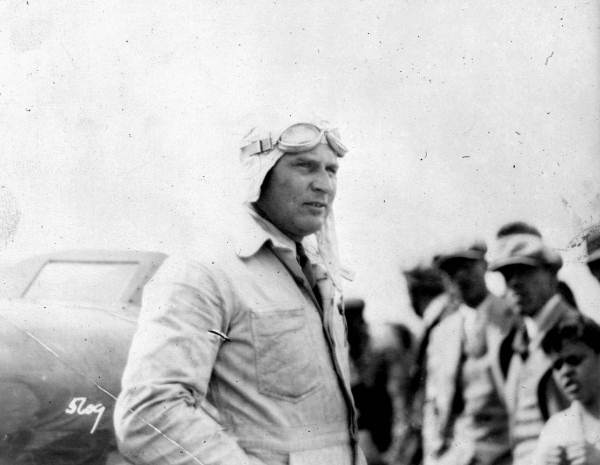
- Keech in front of the Triplex, 1928
- Born: Charles Raymond Keech; May 1, 1900 Coatesville, Pennsylvania, U.S.
- Died: June 15, 1929 (aged 29) Tipton, Pennsylvania, U.S.

Championship titles
- Major victories Indianapolis 500 (1929)

Champ Car career
- 11 races run over 3 years
- Best finish: 2nd (1928, 1929)
- First race: 1927 Atlantic City 200 (Atlantic City)
- Last race: 1929 Altoona 200 #1 (Altoona)
- First win: 1928 Detroit 100 (Detroit)
- Last win: 1929 Indianapolis 500 (Indianapolis)
Wins	Podiums	Poles
4	4	2

Charles Raymond Keech (May 1, 1900 – June 15, 1929) was an American racing driver. He is best remembered for winning the 1929 Indianapolis 500, as well as for setting a land speed record.

== Racing career ==
=== Land speed record ===
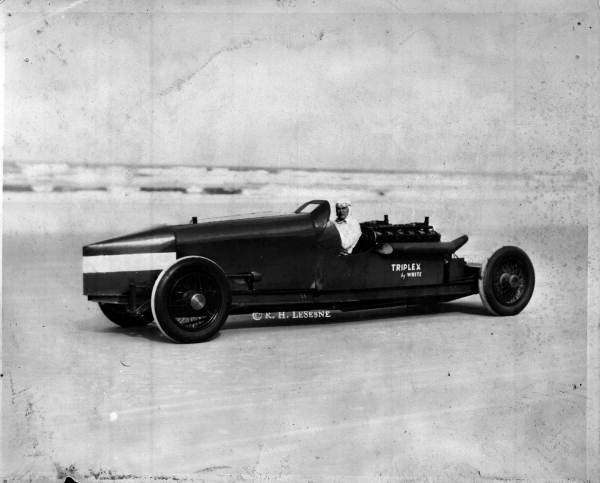
The White Triplex in 1928, driven by Keech

Keech set the land speed record of 207.55 miles per hour (334.02 km/h) on April 22, 1928. He set the record at the Daytona Beach Road Course in the 81-liter triple-engined internal combustion White Triplex 'Spirit of Elkdom'.

During trial runs for the record, Keech suffered burns first as a radiator hose burst, and later on after being reached by exhaust flames from the front engine.

Keech's record was broken by Henry Segrave on March 11, 1929. In 1929, Keech was asked by Triplex owner J. M. White to attempt to break the new record in the Triplex. Keech wisely declined. White hired Lee Bible, who rolled the car and died in his second attempt to set the record.

=== Championship car career ===
Keech won the first race at the Michigan State Fairgrounds Speedway in 1928. He finished in second place in the season points in the AAA National Championship.

Keech qualified sixth for the 1929 Indianapolis 500. Louis Meyer was leading the race, until he lost oil pressure on lap 157. Keech passed for the lead as Meyer's engine refused to fire after he went to the pits to get more oil. Keech led the rest of the race.

== Death ==
Keech died 16 days after his victory at Indianapolis in a racing accident at the Altoona 200-Mile Race in Tipton, Pennsylvania, on June 15, 1929. Rob Robinson ran over a hole in the track sending him into the wooden guardrail. The impact knocked the safety railing onto the track into oncoming traffic. Fellow competitor Cliff Woodbury swerving to avoid Robinson was struck by Keech who also tried to swerve out of the way then Keech hit the guardrail and flipped down the track bursting into flames, simultaneously, Keech was thrown clear of the car, but it rolled over him, crushing his head and tearing off one leg. He was killed instantly.

Keech was buried at the Hephzibah cemetery in Modena, Pennsylvania, in Chester County.

== Awards and honors ==
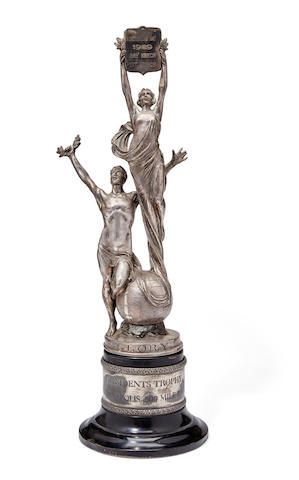
The Indianapolis 500 winner's trophy awarded to Ray Keech

Keech has been inducted into the following halls of fame:

- Auto Racing Hall of Fame (1984)
- Chester County Sports Hall of Fame (2011)

== Motorsports career results ==
=== Indianapolis 500 results ===
Year	Car	Start	Qual	Rank	Finish	Laps	Led	Retired
1928	15	10	113.421	10	4	200	0	Running
1929	2	6	114.905	6	1	200	46	Running
Totals						400	46	

Starts	2
Poles	0
Front Row	0
Wins	1
Top 5	2
Top 10	2
Retired	0

Preceded by Louis Meyer	Indianapolis 500 Winner; 1929	Succeeded by Billy Arnold
