= Bill Spence (racing driver) =

American racing driver (1906–1929)

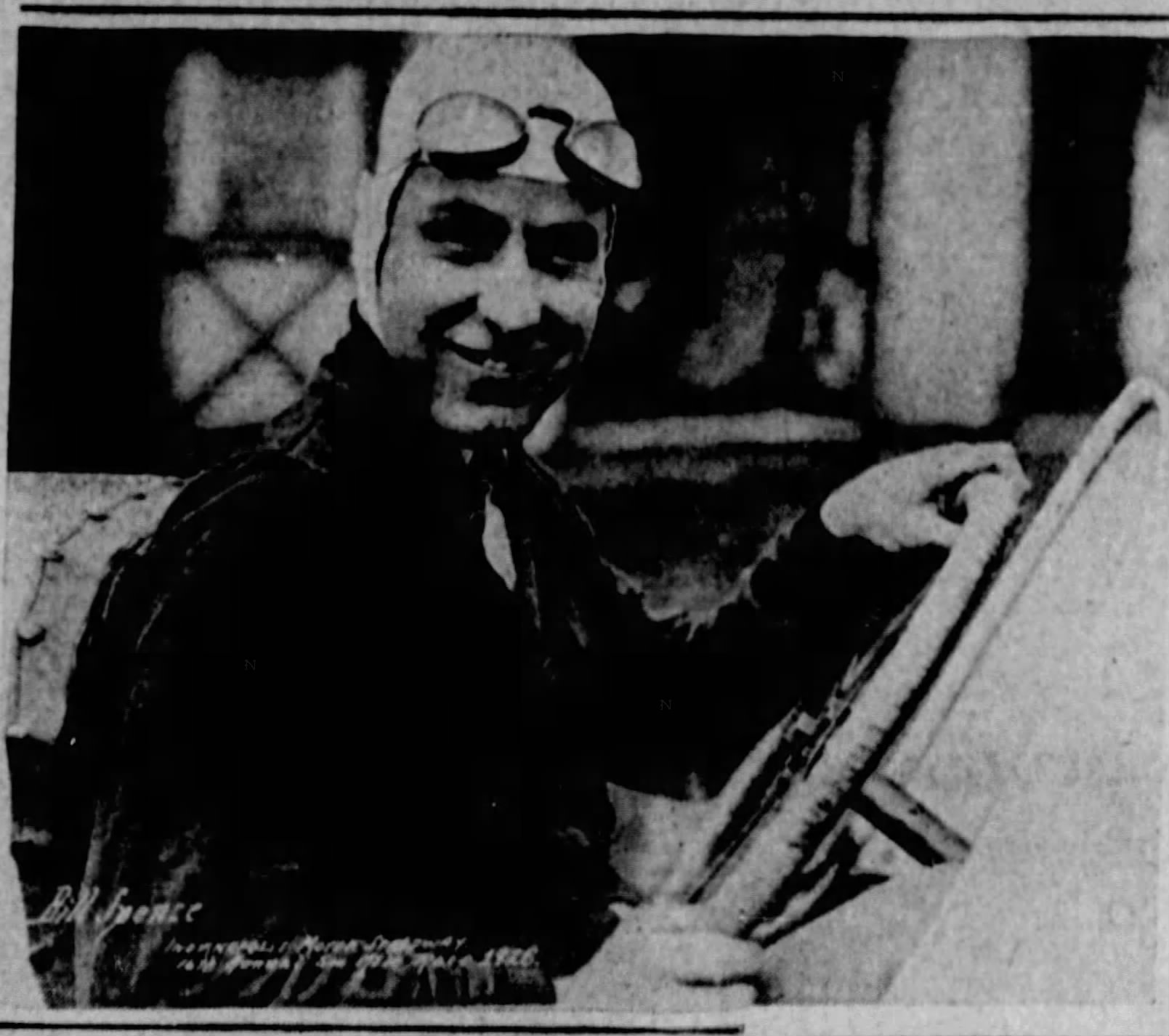
- Spence in 1926
- Born: William Kettley Kimball; June 9, 1906 Los Angeles, California, U.S.
- Died: May 30, 1929 (aged 22) Speedway, Indiana, U.S.

Champ Car career
- 4 races run over 2 years
- Best finish: 10th (1928)
- First race: 1928 Detroit 100 (Detroit)
- Last race: 1929 Indianapolis 500 (Indianapolis)
Wins	Podiums	Poles
0	0	0

William Kettley Spence (born William Kettley Kimball, June 9, 1906 – May 30, 1929) was an American racing driver.

== Death ==
Spence was killed in the 1929 Indianapolis 500 after making contact with the inside wall in Turn 2. This accident was caught on film by the makers of the 1929 silent film Speedway. In the captured film, Spence's front right tire hits the inside wall, indicating the car has previously spun. The car then rotates counterclockwise, and the right side appears to hit a rut or indentation in the track, causing the car to flip, landing upside down. Spence suffered a fractured skull and died before he arrived at the hospital.

Spence also served as a relief driver in the 1928 Indianapolis 500 for Billy Arnold.

== Motorsports career results ==
=== Indianapolis 500 results ===
Year	Car	Start	Qual	Rank	Finish	Laps	Led	Retired
1929	10	12	111.649	16	32	0	0	Crash T2
Totals						0	0	

Starts	1
Poles	0
Front Row	0
Wins	0
Top 5	0
Top 10	0
Retired	1
