= Bert Karnatz =

American racing driver (1905–1934)

- Born: Albert G. Karnatz; February 9, 1905 Dearborn, Michigan, U.S.
- Died: July 15, 1934 (aged 29) Detroit, Michigan, U.S.

Champ Car career
- 3 races run over 3 years
- Best finish: 13th (tie) (1930)
- First race: 1929 Indianapolis 500 (Indianapolis)
- Last race: 1930 Bridgeville 100 (Bridgeville)
Wins	Podiums	Poles
0	1	0

Albert G. Karnatz (February 9, 1905 – July 15, 1934) was an American racing driver. A legend at his local track, he was killed there when he blew a tire at age 29, during a crash at the Veterans of Foreign Wars Speedway in Detroit

== Motorsports career results ==
=== Indianapolis 500 results ===
Year	Car	Start	Qual	Rank	Finish	Laps	Led	Retired
1929	27	31	104.749	31	25	50	0	Gas leak
Totals						50	0	

Starts	1
Poles	0
Front Row	0
Wins	0
Top 5	0
Top 10	0
Retired	1
