= Jules Moriceau =

French racing driver (1887–1977)

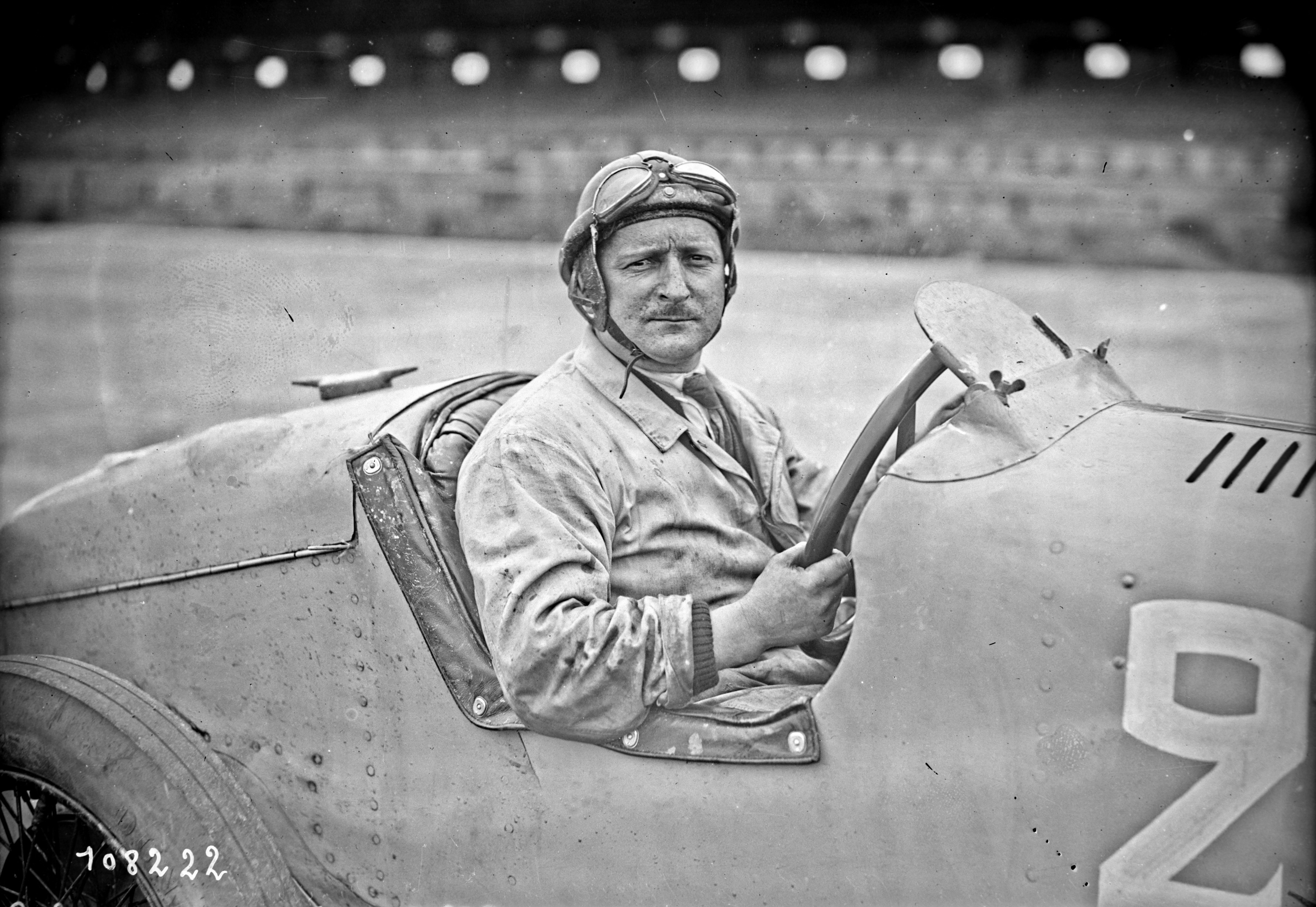
- Moriceau in 1926
- Born: Jules Auguste Moriceau; 2 January 1887 Nantes, Loire-Inférieure, France
- Died: 20 June 1977 (aged 90) Garches, Hauts-de-Seine, France

Champ Car career
- 1 race run over 1 year
- First race: 1929 Indianapolis 500 (Indianapolis)
Wins	Podiums	Poles
0	0	0

24 Hours of Le Mans career
- Years: 1925
- Teams: Talbot-Darracq
- Best finish: DNF (1925)
- Class wins: 0

Jules Auguste Moriceau (2 January 1887 – 20 June 1977) was a French racing driver.

== Career ==
Moriceau was originally a mechanic at Mors and Darracq; after he spent the First World War as an ambulance driver, he joined Ballot and was the riding mechanic for Louis Wagner at the 1919 Indianapolis 500. In 1921 he joined Talbot as a fitter, and soon became chief tester.

After Talbot's (temporary) withdrawal from racing in 1928, Moriceau joined Amilcar as tester and reserve driver, but only drove twice - winning the 1,100cc at the 1929 Grand Prix d'Antibes and at the 1929 Indianapolis 500 - before Amilcar also withdrew from racing, and Moriceau's racing career came to an end.

== Motorsports career results ==
=== Grands Prix ===
He took part in two national Grands Prix; however his debut, in a Talbot at the 1926 British Grand Prix, was a disaster, as his front axle collapsed as soon as he applied the brakes for the first time, and he retired before a lap was out. His second and last appearance was at the 1927 French Grand Prix, at which he was Talbot's designated reserve driver, and on lap 29 (out of 46) the fifth-placed "Williams" stepped out of his car for Moriceau to bring home, which he did so in 4th position.

=== Indianapolis 500 results ===
Year	Car	Start	Qual	Rank	Finish	Laps	Led	Retired
1929	35	15	105.609	29	29	30	0	Crash T4
Totals						30	0	

Starts	1
Poles	0
Front Row	0
Wins	0
Top 5	0
Top 10	0
Retired	1

=== Le Mans results ===
Year	Team	Co-Drivers	Car	Class	Laps	Pos.	Class Pos.
1925	(France) Talbot	(France) Jules Moriceau	Talbot 2SC	1.5	98	ret	ret
