= Jannine Jennky =

French racing driver

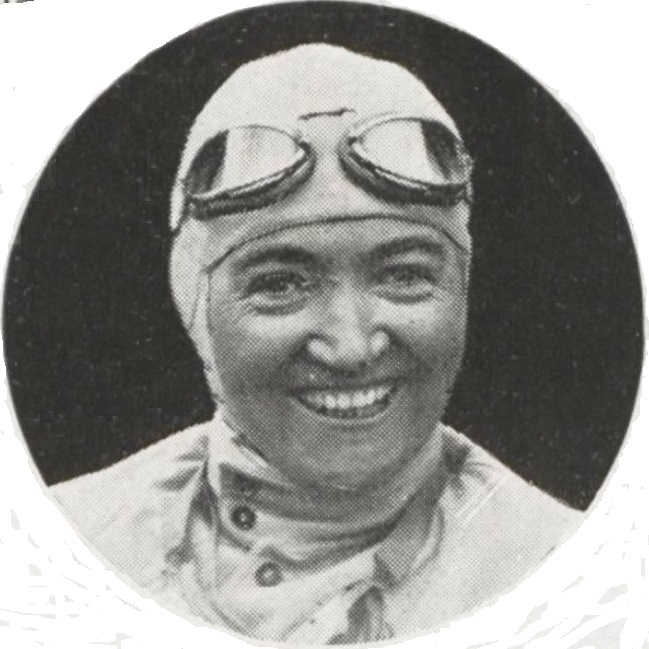
Portrait of Jennky

Jannine Jennky was a French racing driver.

She initially entered hillclimbs, winning in Gaillon near Rouen in 1927, and in Paris in 1928.

She made a successful debut in motor racing, finishing third in the 1927 Grand Prix de la Baule

Her only major win was in the 1928 Coupe de Bourgogne, in Dijon, a race which counted towards the French Championship that year. She beat Louis Chiron, who crashed out of the race after 22 of the 28 laps. Jennky also set the fastest lap of the race.
