= Speedway (1929 film) =

1929 film

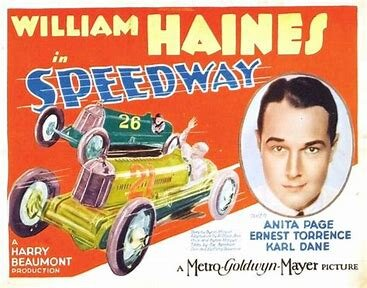
- Directed by: Harry Beaumont
- Written by: Byron Morgan (also story); Alfred Block; Ann Price; Joseph Farnham (titles)
- Starring: William Haines; Anita Page; Ernest Torrence
- Cinematography: Henry Sharp
- Edited by: George Hively
- Production company: Metro-Goldwyn-Mayer
- Distributed by: MGM
- Release date: September 7, 1929
- Running time: 82 minutes
- Country: United States
- Languages: Sound (Synchronized); English intertitles

Speedway is a 1929 American synchronized sound drama film directed by Harry Beaumont and starring William Haines, Anita Page and Ernest Torrence. The film has no audible dialogue but featured a synchronized musical score and sound effects. The soundtrack was recorded using the Western Electric Sound System sound-on-film process. The soundtrack was also transferred to discs for those theatres that were wired with sound-on-disc sound systems. This was Haines' last film without dialogue.

== Plot ==
The film tells the story about a car racer who clashes with his father, also a driver, at the Indianapolis Speedway. Prior to the Indy 500 auto race, Bill Whipple quarrels with his foster father, Jim MacDonald, who is to be one of his rivals that day.

MacDonald suddenly loses his chance to drive because of a heart condition. Whipple's car owner decides to go with another driver, so MacDonald offers his car to Whipple for the race. With victory in sight, Whipple pulls into the pits and lets MacDonald take the checkered flag of victory.

== Cast ==
- William Haines as Bill Whipple
- Anita Page as Patricia Bonner
- Ernest Torrence as Jim MacDonald
- Karl Dane as Dugan
- John Miljan as Lee Renny
- Eugenie Besserer as Mrs. MacDonald
- Polly Moran as Waitress

== Production ==
Much of the film was filmed at the Indianapolis Motor Speedway, including extensive footage of the 1929 'Decoration Day' race.

At the end of the film, it is possible to see a car accident on the track, where the vehicle overturns several times and the driver hits his head on the ground. The driver of the car, Bill Spence, died, due to head trauma. He participates in the grand prix that was taking place in Indianapolis.

== See also ==
- List of early sound feature films (1926–1929)
