= Johnny Seymour =

American racing driver (1896–1958)

- Born: October 8, 1896 Escanaba, Michigan, U.S.
- Died: February 27, 1958 (aged 61) South Bend, Indiana, U.S.

Champ Car career
- 7 races run over 10 years
- First race: 1928 Indianapolis 500 (Indianapolis)
- Last race: 1936 Indianapolis 500 (Indianapolis)
| Wins | Podiums | Poles |
|---|---|---|
| 0 | 0 | 0 |

Johnny Seymour (October 8, 1896 – February 27, 1958) was an American racing driver. Before the First World War, he raced motorcycles, and he toured Australia as a motorcycle racer in the winter of 1924–25. Seymour started racing cars in 1927. He suffered serious burns in a 1939 crash in Indianapolis.

== Motorsports career results ==
=== Indianapolis 500 results ===
| Year | Car | Start | Qual | Rank | Finish | Laps | Led | Retired |
|---|---|---|---|---|---|---|---|---|
| 1928 | 33 | 11 | 111.671 | 14 | 17 | 170 | 0 | Supercharger |
| 1929 | 38 | 16 | 114.307 | 11 | 21 | 65 | 0 | Rear axle |
| 1930 | 39 | 18 | 93.376 | 31 | 32 | 21 | 0 | Crash T3 |
| 1934 | 33 | 33 | 108.591 | 31 | 26 | 22 | 0 | Pinion gear |
| 1935 | 42 | 27 | 112.696 | 28 | 24 | 71 | 0 | Grease leak |
| 1936 | 47 | 21 | 113.169 | 23 | 31 | 13 | 0 | Clutch |
| Totals | | | | | | 362 | 0 | |

| Starts | 6 |
| Poles | 0 |
| Front Row | 0 |
| Wins | 0 |
| Top 5 | 0 |
| Top 10 | 0 |
| Retired | 6 |
