= 1933 AAA Championship Car season =

Auto racing season

- AAA National Championship Trail

Season
- Races: 3
- Start date: May 30
- End date: September 9

Awards
- National champion: (United States) Louis Meyer
- Indianapolis 500 winner: (United States) Louis Meyer

The 1933 AAA Championship Car season consisted of three races, beginning in Speedway, Indiana on May 30 and concluding in Syracuse, New York on September 9. There was one non-championship event. The AAA National Champion and Indianapolis 500 winner was Louis Meyer.

During a tragic year at Indianapolis, Bill Denver and his riding mechanic Bob Hurst died during practice, and during the race Mark Billman, and later Lester Spangler and his riding mechanic G. L. Jordan - in two different accidents. The season ended on 9 September at Syracuse, where a 15 lap non-championship race was scheduled to run after the main event, but was cancelled due to darkness.

== Schedule and results ==
Rnd	Date	Race name	Track	Location	Type	Pole position	Winning driver
1	May 30	(United States) International 500 Mile Sweepstakes	Indianapolis Motor Speedway	Speedway, Indiana	Brick	(United States) Bill Cummings	(United States) Louis Meyer
2	June 11	(United States) Detroit 100	Michigan State Fairgrounds	Detroit, Michigan	Dirt	(United States) Bill Cummings	(United States) Bill Cummings
NC	August 26	(United States) Elgin National Trophy	Elgin Road Race Course	Elgin, Illinois	Road	(United States) Fred Frame	(United States) Phil Shafer
3	September 9	(United States) Syracuse 100	New York State Fairgrounds	Syracuse, New York	Dirt	(United States) Bill Cummings	(United States) Bill Cummings

Dirt/Brick Oval
Road Course/Hill Climb
Non-championship race

== Final points standings ==
Note: Drivers had to be running at the finish to score points. Points scored by drivers sharing a ride were split according to percentage of race driven. Starters were not allowed to score points as relief drivers, if a race starter finished the race in another car, in a points scoring position, those points were awarded to the driver who had started the car.
The final standings based on reference.

Pos	Driver	INDY (United States)	DET (United States)	SYR (United States)	Pts
1	(United States) Louis Meyer	1*	10		610
2	(United States) Lou Moore	3	3	6	530
3	(United States) Wilbur Shaw	2	13	16	450
4	(United States) Chet Gardner	4	DNQ	3	430
5	(United States) Stubby Stubblefield	5	4		325.2
6	(United States) Dave Evans	6		DNQ	250
7	(United States) Bill Cummings	**25**	**1***	**1***	240
8	(United States) Tony Gulotta	7			200
9	(United States) Mauri Rose	35	2	2	180
10	(United States) Russ Snowberger	8	11	7	122.5
11	(United States) Deacon Litz	16	4	5	104.8
12	(United States) Zeke Meyer	9		DNQ	100
13	(United States) Shorty Cantlon	34		4	70
14	(United States) Joe Russo	17	5	15	60
15	(United States) Kelly Petillo	19	6		50
16	(United States) Sam Palmer RY	10		8	43.3
17	(United States) George Barringer	DNQ	8		30
18	(United States) Luther Johnson	10			29
19	(United States) Freddie Winnai	27	7	DNQ	28.4
20	(United States) Al Miller	21	9		20
21	(United States) Ralph DePalma			9	20
22	(United States) Fred Frame	29	7		11.6
23	(United States) George Brayen R			10	10
24	(United States) George Howie	8			4.5
-	(United States) Cliff Bergere	11			0
-	(United States) Tee Linn R			11	0
-	(United States) Johnny Sawyer R	31	12	DNQ	0
-	(United States) L. L. Corum	12			0
-	(United States) Bob Zauer R			12	0
-	(United States) Willard Prentiss R	13			0
-	(United States) Harold Shaw R	13			0
-	(United States) Bob Hahn R			13	0
-	(United States) Gene Haustein	15	14	14	0
-	(Argentina) Juan Gaudino	14			0
-	(Argentina) Raúl Riganti	14			0
-	(United States) Doc MacKenzie	18		DNQ	0
-	(United States) Sam Hoffman R	19			0
-	(United States) Chet Miller	20			0
-	(United States) Bennett Hill	22			0
-	(United States) Babe Stapp	23			0
-	(United States) Wesley Crawford	24			0
-	(United States) Billy Winn	24			0
-	(United States) Les Spangler	26			0
-	(United States) Terry Curley R	27			0
-	(United States) Malcolm Fox	28			0
-	(United States) Mark Billman R	30			0
-	(United States) Ernie Triplett	32			0
-	(United States) Pete Kreis	33			0
-	(United States) Frank Brisko	36			0
-	(United States) Ira Hall	37			0
-	(United States) Ralph Hepburn	38			0
-	(United States) Ray Campbell	39			0
-	(United States) Paul Bost	40			0
-	(United States) Rick Decker	41			0
-	(United States) Louis Schneider	42			0
-	(United States) Howard Wilcox	DNS			0
-	(United States) Maynard Clark			DNS	0
-	(United States) Ray Carter	DNQ		DNQ	0
-	(United States) Bill Sockwell	DNQ		DNQ	0
-	(United States) Al Aspen	DNQ			0
-	(United States) Paul Butler	DNQ			0
-	(United States) Frank Davidson	DNQ			0
-	(United States) Danny Day	DNQ			0
-	(United States) Leon DeHart	DNQ			0
-	(United States) Bill Denver	DNQ			0
-	(United States) Harry Falt	DNQ			0
-	(United States) William Gardner	DNQ			0
-	(Canada) Leonide Albert LaRivière	DNQ			0
-	(United States) Harry Lewis	DNQ			0
-	(United States) Virgil Livengood	DNQ			0
-	(United States) Roy Painter	DNQ			0
-	(United States) Phil Shafer	DNQ			0
-	(United States) Overton Snell	DNQ			0
-	(United States) Doc Williams	DNQ			0
-	(United States) James Patterson			DNQ	0
-	(United States) Gene Pirong			DNQ	0
Pos	Driver	INDY (United States)	DET (United States)	SYR (United States)	Pts

Color	Result
Gold	Winner
Silver	2nd place
Bronze	3rd place
Green	4th & 5th place
Light Blue	6th-10th place
Dark Blue	Finished (Outside Top 10)
Purple	Did not finish (Ret)
Red	Did not qualify (DNQ)
Brown	Withdrawn (Wth)
Black	Disqualified (DSQ)
White	Did not start (DNS)
Blank	Did not participate (DNP)
Blank	Not competing

**In-line notation**
**Bold**	Pole position
Italics	Ran fastest race lap
*	Led most race laps
Rookie of the Year
Rookie

== See also ==
- 1933 Indianapolis 500
