= 1932 AAA Championship Car season =

Auto racing season

- AAA National Championship Trail

Season
- Races: 6
- Start date: May 30
- End date: November 13

Awards
- National champion: (United States) Bob Carey
- Indianapolis 500 winner: (United States) Fred Frame

The 1932 AAA Championship Car season consisted of six races, beginning in Speedway, Indiana on May 30 and concluding in San Leandro, California on November 13. The AAA National Champion was Bob Carey and the Indianapolis 500 winner was Fred Frame.

Milton Jones died at Indianapolis in practice; during qualifications, Bennie Bennefiel and his riding mechanic Harry Cox died.

== Schedule and results ==
All races running on Dirt/Brick Oval.

Rnd	Date	Race name	Track	Location	Type	Pole position	Winning driver
1	May 30	(United States) International 500 Mile Sweepstakes	Indianapolis Motor Speedway	Speedway, Indiana	Brick	(United States) Lou Moore	(United States) Fred Frame
2	June 5	(United States) Detroit 100^{A}	Michigan State Fairgrounds	Detroit, Michigan	Dirt	(United States) Bill Cummings	(United States) Bob Carey
3	June 19	(United States) Roby 100	Roby Speedway	Roby, Indiana	Dirt	—	(United States) Stubby Stubblefield
4	July 2	(United States) Syracuse 100^{B}	New York State Fairgrounds	Syracuse, New York	Dirt	(United States) Bill Cummings	(United States) Bob Carey
5	September 10	(United States) Detroit 100	Michigan State Fairgrounds	Detroit, Michigan	Dirt	(United States) Bob Carey	(United States) Mauri Rose
6	November 13	(United States) Oakland 150	Oakland Speedway	San Leandro, California	Dirt	(United States) Bill Cummings	(United States) Bill Cummings

^A Scheduled for 100 miles, stopped after 83 miles due to rain.
^B Scheduled for 100 miles, stopped after 81 miles due to rain.

== Final points standings ==
Note: Drivers had to be running at the finish to score points. Points scored by drivers sharing a ride were split according to percentage of race driven. Starters were not allowed to score points as relief drivers, if a race starter finished the race in another car, in a points scoring position, those points were awarded to the driver who had started the car..
The final standings based on reference.

Pos	Driver	INDY (United States)	DET1 (United States)	ROB (United States)	SYR (United States)	DET2 (United States)	OAK (United States)	Pts
1	(United States) Bob Carey RY	4	1	6	1*	**7***	2*	815
2	(United States) Fred Frame	1*	3	10	14	9	12	710
3	(United States) Howard Wilcox R	2	2	4	13	12	7	610
4	(United States) Russ Snowberger	5	6	8	17	5		440
5	(United States) Bill Cummings	19	**11***	3	**3**	2	**1**	430
6	(United States) Cliff Bergere	3						400
7	(United States) Mauri Rose R	DNQ		5		1	4	285
8	(United States) Stubby Stubblefield	14	4	1	2			280
9	(United States) Zeke Meyer	6						250
10	(United States) Ira Hall	7	8	13	DNQ			221
11	(United States) Al Gordon R	40	DNS	2	8	4	6	215
12	(United States) Sam Ross	DNQ	5	5	4	13		190
13	(United States) Freddie Winnai	8	DNQ	9	DNQ			170
14	(United States) Ernie Triplett	22	10	DNQ			3	120
15	(United States) Wilbur Shaw	17	9	DNQ			5	110
16	(United States) Al Miller R	27	14	DNQ	DNQ	3		80
17	(United States) Joe Russo	24	7	7	16	DNQ		80
18	(United States) James Patterson	9			DNQ			52.5
19	(United States) Bryan Saulpaugh	32			DNQ	6	10	50
20	(United States) Ray Campbell R	30	DNQ	DNQ	6	DNQ		50
21	(United States) Shorty Cantlon				DNQ		6	50
22	(United States) Billy Winn	9			DNQ			47.5
23	(United States) Doc MacKenzie	28	DNQ	DNQ	7			40
24	(United States) Joe Huff	10						35.8
25	(United States) Chet Miller	21	DNQ	DNQ	15	8		30
26	(United States) Gene Haustein	DNQ	DNQ	14	9	14		20
27	(United States) Dusty Fahrnow R	10						14.2
28	(United States) Frank Farmer				10			10
29	(United States) Eddie Meyer R	7						9
-	(United States) Louis Tomei R						8	0
-	(United States) Kelly Petillo R	12					9	0
-	(United States) Jack Patterson R					10		0
-	(United States) Louis Schneider	23	13	11	11	DNS		0
-	(United States) Frank Brisko	29				11		0
-	(United States) Phil Shafer	11			DNQ			0
-	(United States) Babe Stapp						11	0
-	(United States) George Barringer R			12	18			0
-	(United States) Malcolm Fox	20	12	DNQ	DNQ			0
-	(United States) Al Aspen	34	DNQ	DNQ	12			0
-	(United States) Louis Meyer	33			DNQ		13	0
-	(United States) Tony Gulotta	13						0
-	(United States) Chris Vest R						14	0
-	(United States) Pete Kreis	15						0
-	(United States) Les Spangler R						15	0
-	(United States) Luther Johnson	16						0
-	(United States) Deacon Litz	18		DNQ	DNQ			0
-	(United States) Lou Moore	**25**						0
-	(United States) Joseph Bonadeo	26						0
-	(Argentina) Juan Gaudino R	26						0
-	(United States) Billy Arnold	31						0
-	(United States) Johnny Krieger	35						0
-	(United States) Wesley Crawford	36						0
-	(United States) Paul Bost	37			DNQ			0
-	(United States) Bob McDonogh	38						0
-	(United States) Gus Schrader R	39						0
-	(Kingdom of Italy) Gabriel Nardi				DNS			0
-	(United States) Sam Palmer						DNS	0
-	(United States) George Kalen	DNQ	DNQ		DNQ			0
-	(United States) George Howie	DNQ		DNQ	DNQ			0
-	(United States) Harry Hunt	DNQ		DNQ				0
-	(United States) Jack Mertz	DNQ			DNQ			0
-	(United States) Roy Painter	DNQ			DNQ			0
-	(United States) A. C. Aiken	DNQ						0
-	(United States) Bennie Benefiel	DNQ						0
-	(United States) Arvol Brunmeier	DNQ						0
-	(United States) Buddy Calloway	DNQ						0
-	(United States) Fred Clemons	DNQ						0
-	(United States) L. L. Corum	DNQ						0
-	(United States) Danny Day	DNQ						0
-	(United States) Leon DeHart	DNQ						0
-	(United States) Leon Duray	DNQ						0
-	(United States) William Gardner	DNQ						0
-	(United States) Sam Grecco	DNQ						0
-	(United States) Milton Jones	DNQ						0
-	(United States) Edward Leipert	DNQ						0
-	(United States) Milt Marion	DNQ						0
-	(United States) Barney McKenna	DNQ						0
-	(United States) Fred Merzney	DNQ						0
-	(United States) Paul Rice	DNQ						0
-	(United States) Al Theisen	DNQ						0
-	(United States) Marion Trexler	DNQ						0
-	(United States) Larry Wall	DNQ						0
-	(United States) George Wingerter	DNQ						0
-	(United States) Harry Lewis		DNQ					0
-	(United States) George Beck				DNQ			0
-	(United States) Walter Berne				DNQ			0
-	(United States) Ray Carter				DNQ			0
-	(United States) Ted Chamberlain				DNQ			0
-	(United States) George Metzler				DNQ			0
-	(United States) Bob Post				DNQ			0
-	(United States) Cliff Thomas				DNQ			0
-	(United States) George Bailey					DNQ		0
-	(United States) Clay Corbitt					DNQ		0
-	(Canada) Howard Dauphin					DNQ		0
-	(United States) Rollin May					DSQ		0
-	(United States) J. Toren					DSQ		0
Pos	Driver	INDY (United States)	DET1 (United States)	ROB (United States)	SYR (United States)	DET2 (United States)	OAK (United States)	Pts

Color	Result
Gold	Winner
Silver	2nd place
Bronze	3rd place
Green	4th & 5th place
Light Blue	6th-10th place
Dark Blue	Finished (Outside Top 10)
Purple	Did not finish (Ret)
Red	Did not qualify (DNQ)
Brown	Withdrawn (Wth)
Black	Disqualified (DSQ)
White	Did not start (DNS)
Blank	Did not participate (DNP)
Blank	Not competing

**In-line notation**
**Bold**	Pole position
Italics	Ran fastest race lap
*	Led most race laps
Rookie of the Year
Rookie

== See also ==
- 1932 Indianapolis 500
