= 1932 Indianapolis 500 =

American motor race

20th Indianapolis 500

Indianapolis Motor Speedway

Indianapolis 500
- Sanctioning body: AAA
- Date: May 30, 1932
- Winner: Fred Frame
- Winning Riding Mechanic: Jerry Houck
- Winning Entrant: Harry Hartz
- Winning time: 4:48:03.79
- Average speed: 104.144 mph (167.604 km/h)
- Pole position: Lou Moore
- Pole speed: 117.363 mph (188.877 km/h)
- Most laps led: Fred Frame (58)

Pre-race
- Pace car: Lincoln Model KB
- Pace car driver: Edsel Ford
- Starter: Gar Wood
- Honorary referee: Harry S. Firestone

Chronology
Previous	Next
1931	1933

The 20th International 500-Mile Sweepstakes Race was held at the Indianapolis Motor Speedway on Monday, May 30, 1932. Attrition was the story of the race, with 26 of the 40 cars dropping out due to crashes or mechanical failure. A record eight different drivers led laps during the race, with no driver seemingly able to hold the lead without experiencing some sort of trouble. For the third year in a row, Billy Arnold looked as if he would be the dominant car, but he sailed over the turn three wall on lap 59. Rookie Bob Carey also hit the wall while leading. Fred Frame took the lead for good on lap 152, and won from the 27th starting position - the furthest back of any winner except for Ray Harroun in 1911 and later, Louis Meyer in 1936. Frame was accompanied by riding mechanic Jerry Houck.

In the third year of the "stock-based" formula (also known as the "Junk" formula), speeds were beginning to increase once again, but not quite to levels seen in the late-1920s. Lou Moore qualified for the pole position with an average speed of 117.363 mph, the fastest time trial run in three years. Likewise on race day, Frame's winning average speed of 104.144 mph broke Peter DePaolo's record set back in 1925.

The race was part of the 1932 AAA Championship Car season. The month was marred by two fatalities during practice. Riding mechanic Harry Cox was killed in a crash on May 25, and driver Milton Jones died from injuries suffered in a crash on May 27.

== Race schedule ==
Race schedule – May 1932
Sun	Mon	Tue	Wed	Thu	Fri	Sat
1	2	3	4	5	6	7
8	9	10	11	12	13	14
15	16	17	18	19	20	21; Time Trials
22; Time Trials	23; Time Trials	24; Time Trials	25; Time Trials	26; Time Trials	27; Time Trials	28; Time Trials
29	30; Indy 500	31				

Color	Notes
Green	Track Available for Practice
Dark Blue	Time trials
Silver	Race day
Blank	No track activity

== Practice – April ==
The deadline for entries to be received was midnight on Monday May 2. Teams and drivers began arriving at the Speedway in early April, setting up shop in Gasoline Alley. In addition, Tom Beall's popular diner was already open in the garage area. Tony Gulotta was on the track in the Hunt Special on April 6, as was Lou Moore in the Boyle Valve Special. Making news in mid-April was Argentine driver Juan Gaudino, who arrived on April 13 to enter the race for the first time. Gaudino had intended to enter in 1931, but withdrew after a crash in South America just before he was to make the trip.

On Monday April 18, Joe Russo was practicing on the track when he lost control at the north end and crashed into the retaining wall. He suffered minor injuries to his head and face, and needed three stitches to his lip. The frame of the car was bent, but the car was expected to be repaired.

Billy Devore, Terry Curley, S.T. "Pink" Donaldson, and Bert Lustig, all arrived from the west coast on April 21, each looking for rides. Some of the biggest news came on April 27. Babe Stapp was seriously injured in a crash at Legion Ascot Speedway, and would be forced to sit out the month of May.

By the end of April, at least nine cars were already at the Speedway being prepped. Drivers were even spending some free time at the Speedway Golf Course.

== Practice – Week 1 ==
The deadline for entries to be received was midnight on Monday May 2. Though initially down from the previous year (72 entries), at least 40 cars had submitted entries by May 1, and more were expected when postmarked entries were all processed.

- Sunday May 1: Tony Gulotta and Luther Johnson teamed up to test one of the Studebaker entries for 660 miles at an average speed of 102.6 mph.
- Monday May 2: More entries continued to come in, swelling the entry list to 68 cars. Of interest was the Bowes Seal Fast team announcing a three-car effort with drivers Bill Cummings, Louis Schneider, and Deacon Litz
- Tuesday May 3: Last-minute entries brought the total to 71-72 cars, matching the number from 1931.
- Wednesday May 4: Juan Gaudino was sent to the hospital with burns on his face and hands after an acetylene torch he was working with exploded in the garage area. He was expected to be back in the car within a couple days. Russ Snowberger was out on the track, and suffered a flat tire.
- Friday May 6: Though track activity had been fairly light most of the week, by Friday, over one-third of the 71 expected entries had arrived at the Speedway.
- Saturday May 7: Some of the drivers left Indianapolis for the day to compete in other events. Billy Arnold, Deacon Litz, and Ira Hall competed in a special race meet in Chicago. Bill Cummings, Billy Winn, Paul Bost, and others raced at Langhorne.

== Practice – Week 2 ==
- Monday May 9: The five Studebaker Specials entries were out on the track on Monday. The drivers were Tony Gulotta, Luther Johnson, Pete Kreis, Cliff Bergere, and Bob McDonogh. Off the track, 1930 winner Billy Arnold was married in Chicago. He was expected to arrive at the track for practice later in the week.
- Tuesday May 10: Much of Tuesday was spent taking photographs with the cars and drivers.
- Wednesday May 11: At approximately 3 p.m., Ira Hall went into turn one at about 106 mph when he lost control. The car started sliding to the inside fence, he corrected, and the car slid up to the outside barrier. It slid along the outside wall for about 100 feet, then spun to the middle of the track. The car's frame was broken in the front. Neither Hall nor his riding mechanic G.A. Casey were injured. Leon Duray arrived at the Speedway for the first time Wednesday evening.
- Thursday May 12: Russ Snowberger was out on the track Thursday in the Hupp Comet. He had two laps of 114 mph. L. L. Corum, whose car was now disassembled, was not expected to be out on the track again for another week. Harry Miller's 16-cylinder machine (driven in 1931 by Shorty Cantlon) was expected to arrive on Friday and be on the track with Bryan Saulpaugh behind the wheel.
- Friday May 13: T.E. "Pop" Meyers announced that he declined Louis Schneider's request to use car #13, citing a AAA Contest Board rule. Few cars made laps Friday, owing not little to the superstitious nature of Friday the 13th. Chet Miller took a few laps, but lightly brushed the wall in the south short chute. Pete Kreis did a ten-lap radiator test in his Studebaker, then was reportedly upset when informed he was driving on Friday the 13th. Also on the track were Frank Brisko and Roy Painter, but only for one or two slow laps apiece.

== Practice – Week 3 ==
- Sunday May 15: Joe Huff was out on the track in the S.O. Goldberg entry. Billy Arnold arrived at the Speedway Sunday, and expected to drive his first laps on Tuesday. Fred Frame was in Reading for the weekend, and won two races. Leon Duray's 16-cylinder car was seen in the garage area, and was expected to practice on Tuesday. After overheating problems plagued the car in 1931, the team reported that significant improvements had been made for 1932.
- Monday May 16: Wilbur Shaw was reported to be en route to the Speedway from California.
- Tuesday May 17: Louis Schneider was out on the track in the #1 Bowes Seal Fast Special. Juan Gaudino, who lost time due to changing engines, was now reportedly out on the track regularly. Off the track, Gar Wood was named the official starter for race day.
- Wednesday May 18: Several cars took to the track on Wednesday, as elimination trials were drawing closer. Frank Brisko made several medium paced laps, Louis Meyer was on the track in his 16-cylinder machine, and Joe Huff had been on the track as well (105 mph). Al Miller ran a lap of 111 mph, and Bryan Saulpaugh drove one of Harry Miller's 16-cylinder machines. Just before sunset, Roy Painter suffered a flat tire going into turn three. He avoided another car, and swerved into the outside wall. The car suffered a bent rear spring and axle. Painter and his riding mechanic Thane Houser were not injured, and the car was expected to be repaired by the end of the week.
- Thursday May 19: Lou Moore led the speed chart with a practice lap of 117 mph. Also out on the track were Louis Meyer (112 mph), Luther Johnson, Fred Frame, Marion Trexler, Billy Winn, Bob Carey, and Gene Haustein. Just before sundown, Russ Snowberger suffered a flat tire as he was driving through turn 3. He skidded but kept the car off the wall.
- Friday May 20: Newcomer Mauri Rose, driving the Jones-Miller, skidded at the exit of turn 4, and hit the outside wall. The car slid along the outside hub rail, crossed the track, then came to rest along the inside barrier. Rose was not injured, but the car suffered damage to the frame. Ira Hall, who hit the wall earlier in the month, was back out on the track Friday. Howdy Wilcox II completed a lap of 113.5 mph.

== Time trials ==
Qualifications was scheduled for seven days, starting on Saturday May 21, and continuing through Friday May 27. Four-lap (10 mile) qualifying runs were used. Each entry was allowed three attempts to qualify. The minimum speed for qualifying was set at 100 mph. Each day of time trials would end at sundown.

=== Saturday May 21 ===
The first day of time trials was scheduled for Saturday May 21 from 10:00 a.m. to 6:59 p.m. (sundown). All cars were required to be in line no later than 5 p.m. in order to make a qualifying attempt. Over 12,000 spectators arrived under hot and sunny weather conditions. During a run in the morning, Bryan Saulpaugh driving one of Harry Miller's 16-cylinder machines, had just completed a lap of 116 mph when a tire blew going into turn 1. Traveling more than 120 mph, he entered the turn too fast and the tread sheared off the tire. The car broke into a spin, but Saulpaugh was able to keep the car off the wall. Also having trouble in the morning was Zeke Meyer, who hit the wall in turn four after something broke in the steering mechanism.

Frank Brisko (111.149 mph) was the first driver to complete a qualifying run. Luther Johnson blew a tire and pulled into the pits during his first attempt. The early qualifiers were led by Billy Arnold, who put in a four-lap average of 116.290 mph. Bryan Saulpaugh, who had avoided serious mishap during a practice run, rebounded to post a four-lap average of 114.369 mph, good enough for the front row.

Late in the day, Lou Moore took the track, and grabbed the pole position with a four-lap average of 117.363 mph. His fourth lap (118.577 mph) was a single-lap track record for a non-supercharged engine. The previous year's polesitter, Russ Snowberger, qualified fourth.

The day ended with the field filled to 21 cars.

Pos	No.	Name	Lap 1 (mph)	Lap 2 (mph)	Lap 3 (mph)	Lap 4 (mph)	Average Speed (mph)
1	8	(United States) Lou Moore	116.595	117.249	117.066	118.577	117.363
2	5	(United States) Billy Arnold W	115.920	116.279	116.279	116.686	116.290
3	27	(United States) Bryan Saulpaugh R	114.373	114.518	114.460	114.126	114.369
4	4	(United States) Russ Snowberger	113.967	114.141	114.708	114.489	114.326
5	35	(United States) Ira Hall	113.967	113.737	114.358	114.767	114.206
6	6	(United States) Howdy Wilcox II R	113.794	114.358	113.350	112.388	113.468
7	16	(United States) Louis Meyer W	112.599	112.122	112.136	113.037	112.471
8	17	(United States) Paul Bost	112.402	112.416	111.566	111.166	111.885
9	2	(United States) Billy Winn	111.704	111.607	112.346	111.552	111.801
10	22	(United States) Cliff Bergere	111.001	111.773	111.690	111.552	111.503
11	46	(United States) Luther Johnson	110.633	111.607	111.345	111.290	111.218
12	10	(United States) Bill Cummings	111.070	111.043	111.303	111.400	111.204
13	32	(United States) Frank Brisko	110.343	111.152	111.455	111.649	111.149
14	61	(United States) Bob Carey R	110.538	111.359	111.483	110.906	111.070
15	55	(United States) Joe Huff	110.254	1110.132	1110.647	110.579	110.402
16	48	(United States) Wesley Crawford	109.237	111.400	111.469	109.516	110.396
17	18	(United States) Pete Kreis	109.877	110.146	110.728	110.335	110.270
18	29	(United States) Al Miller R	109.930	109.944	110.443	110.200	110.129
19	24	(United States) Deacon Litz	111.070	110.308	108.108	108.748	109.546
20	25	(United States) Tony Gulotta	109.078	108.630	108.946	108.932	108.896
21	41	(United States) Joe Russo	108.499	108.395	108.893	109.383	108.791

- Source: The Indianapolis News

=== Sunday May 22 ===
The second day of time trials was held Sunday May 22. Only two cars qualified, Wilbur Shaw and Al Aspen. Shaw's four-lap average speed (114.326 mph) time was identical to Russ Snowberger's from a day earlier.

Pos	No.	Name	Lap 1 (mph)	Lap 2 (mph)	Lap 3 (mph)	Lap 4 (mph)	Average Speed (mph)
22	3	(United States) Wilbur Shaw	113.737	114.548	114.987	114.040	114.326
23	21	(United States) Al Aspen	108.199	107.953	107.373	108.512	108.008

- Source: The Indianapolis News

=== Monday May 23 ===
The third day of time trials was held Monday May 23. Hartwell "Stubby" Stubblefield wowed the crowd with a first lap of 117.310 mph, nearly as fast as the pole position. He upped his speed to 117.540 mph, and appeared to be on his way to becoming the fastest qualifier. On his fourth and final lap, however, he sensed he had a tire going down. Going into turn 3, he backed off and attempted to coast around to the pits, intending to abort the run. He shut the engine off on the mainstretch, but inadvertently coasted across the finish line. Officials ruled that he had completed the run, and the time would stand. His fourth lap of 101.488 pulled his four-lap average down to 112.988 mph. Instead of being the fastest qualifier, he had to settle for the slower speed, but nevertheless, was safely qualified.

Bob McDonogh made a conservative run of 113.279 mph, to be the fastest car of the afternoon, and the first four-wheel drive car in Indy history. Phil Shafer was the only other qualifier, putting in a speed of 110.708 mph without wearing a helmet.

By the end of the third day, only 26 (of 40) grid position had been filled. With many strong contenders still in the garage area, officials reiterated that qualifications would continue through Saturday as needed, to ensure all cars had the opportunity to qualify.

Pos	No.	Name	Lap 1 (mph)	Lap 2 (mph)	Lap 3 (mph)	Lap 4 (mph)	Average Speed (mph)
24	58	(United States) Bob McDonogh	112.938	112.388	113.179	114.635	113.279
25	15	(United States) Stubby Stubblefield	117.310	117.570	117.005	101.488	112.899
26	33	(United States) Phil Shafer	110.769	110.240	110.674	110.152	110.708

- Source: The Indianapolis News

=== Tuesday May 24 ===
The fourth day of time trials was held Tuesday May 24. Qualifications continued to move at a slow pace, as only two cars completed runs Tuesday. Late in the day, Gus Schrader was the first driver out, in the four-wheel drive Miller Special. The car had only been on the track three days, and the 112.003 mph average, though safe to make the field, was said to be modest to its capabilities. Fred Frame was the only other driver on the track, also driving a newly arrived machine. Frame's car had arrived only three days earlier, and had been on the track only once, but not at speed.

Pos	No.	Name	Lap 1 (mph)	Lap 2 (mph)	Lap 3 (mph)	Lap 4 (mph)	Average Speed (mph)
27	34	(United States) Fred Frame	113.479	113.364	113.982	114.606	113.856
28	45	(United States) Gus Schrader R	112.740	112.528	111.193	111.566	112.003

- Source: The Indianapolis News

=== Wednesday May 25 ===
The fifth day of time trials was held Wednesday May 25. To the increasing chagrin of officials, only one car completed a qualifying attempt, further dragging out the already slow qualifying process. Chet Miller secured the 29th spot in the field, leaving eleven spots open. The day was marred by the death of Harry Cox, the riding mechanic for Bennie Benefiel. The car hit the inside wall, lost a wheel, then skidded into the outside wall. The car went over the outside retaining wall in turn 1, and dropped twenty feet to the ground. It hit two trees, then came to rest against another tree. Benefiel and Cox were thrown from the car. Benefiel was conscious but seriously injured. Cox suffered a broken neck and other injuries, and died at the scene.

Louis Schneider had his car out on the track for practice, but came in complaining of steering problems. Roy Painter announced his car was withdrawn due to an illegal tread width.

Pos	No.	Name	Lap 1 (mph)	Lap 2 (mph)	Lap 3 (mph)	Lap 4 (mph)	Average Speed (mph)
29	9	(United States) Chet Miller	111.912	111.207	110.105	111.001	111.053

- Source: The Indianapolis News

=== Thursday May 26 ===
The sixth day of time trials was held Thursday May 26. For the second day in a row, only one car completed a run. Louis Schneider, driving the same Bowes Seal Fast entry he won with in 1931, took the 30th starting position.

Pos	No.	Name	Lap 1 (mph)	Lap 2 (mph)	Lap 3 (mph)	Lap 4 (mph)	Average Speed (mph)
30	1	(United States) Louis Schneider W	110.457	110.728	110.619	110.919	110.681

- Source: The Indianapolis News

=== Friday May 27 ===
The seventh day of time trials was held on Friday May 27. The day was marred by the second fatality in three days. Milton Jones and his riding mechanic Harold Gray were on a practice run early in the day when car went out of control in turn one. The car went over the wall in turn one, and landed upright on a grassy plot outside of the track. Both Jones and Gray were thrown from the car. Gray survived, suffering a broken arm and internal injuries. Jones died about six hours later at City Hospital. In a separate incident, Ira Hall crashed his already-qualified car in turn 3. The car was badly damaged, but Hall was not injured. Also having trouble was Paul Rice, whose car broke a front axle. He narrowly missed hitting the outside wall at the exit of turn four.

Seven cars completed qualifying runs, but George Howie would eventually be "crowded out" (bumped) from the field on Saturday. Gene Haustein made an unsuccessful attempt.

Pos	No.	Name	Lap 1 (mph)	Lap 2 (mph)	Lap 3 (mph)	Lap 4 (mph)	Average Speed (mph)	Notes
31	7	(United States) Ernie Triplett	114.899	114.577	115.237	115.031	114.935	
32	57	(United States) Malcolm Fox R	110.988	111.221	111.635	110.756	111.149	
33	49	(United States) Johnny Krieger R	108.669	109.290	109.369	109.783	109.276	
34	72	(United States) Ray Campbell R	108.212	109.676	109.904	108.108	108.969	
35	65	(United States) Freddie Winnai	109.250	108.212	108.212	109.369	108.755	
36	14	(Argentina) Juan Gaudino R	106.257	107.463	108.082	108.082	107.466	
DNQ	47	(United States) George Howie	102.658	103.401	103.746	104.167	103.490	Bumped 5/28
DNQ	23	(United States) Gene Haustein	106	106	0.000	0.000	—	Incomplete

- Source: The Indianapolis News,The Indianapolis Star

=== Saturday May 28 ===
The final day of time trials was held on Saturday May 28. Due to the number of spots remaining, and the number of entries still to qualify, the hours for qualifying were extended to 10:00 a.m. to 4:00 p.m. for Saturday. The field was filled to 40 cars, and two drivers (George Howie and James Patterson) were "crowded out." Kelly Petillo made the field just before the close of qualifying.

After qualifying concluded, the track was closed to clean up oil spills and prepare the surface for the race. A brief session was allowed late Sunday afternoon for the traditional "carburetion tests."

Pos	No.	Name	Lap 1 (mph)	Lap 2 (mph)	Lap 3 (mph)	Lap 4 (mph)	Average Speed (mph)	Notes
37	26	(United States) Al Gordon R	111.649	111.207	111.649	110.660	111.290	
38	37	(United States) Zeke Meyer	109.887	110.660	111.207	111.246	110.745	
39	42	(United States) Doc MacKenzie R	107.630	107.940	108.431	108.630	108.154	
40	36	(United States) Kelly Petillo R	104.554	104.372	104.457	105.202	104.645	
DNQ	75	(United States) James Patterson	101.260	100.919	101.203	101.603	101.246	Bumped 5/28

- Source: The Indianapolis News, The Sandusky Register, The Indianapolis Star

== Starting grid ==
Row	Inside	Middle	Outside
1	(United States) Lou Moore	(United States) Billy Arnold W	(United States) Bryan Saulpaugh R
2	(United States) Russ Snowberger	(United States) Ira Hall	(United States) Howdy Wilcox II R
3	(United States) Louis Meyer W	(United States) Paul Bost	(United States) Billy Winn
4	(United States) Cliff Bergere	(United States) Luther Johnson	(United States) Bill Cummings
5	(United States) Frank Brisko	(United States) Bob Carey R	(United States) Joe Huff
6	(United States) Wesley Crawford	(United States) Pete Kreis	(United States) Al Miller R
7	(United States) Deacon Litz	(United States) Tony Gulotta	(United States) Joe Russo
8	(United States) Wilbur Shaw	(United States) Al Aspen	(United States) Bob McDonogh
9	(United States) Stubby Stubblefield	(United States) Phil Shafer	(United States) Fred Frame
10	(United States) Gus Schrader R	(United States) Chet Miller	(United States) Louis Schneider W
11	(United States) Ernie Triplett	(United States) Malcolm Fox R	(United States) Johnny Krieger R
12	(United States) Ray Campbell R	(United States) Freddie Winnai	(Argentina) Juan Gaudino R
13	(United States) Al Gordon R	(United States) Zeke Meyer	(United States) Doc MacKenzie R
14	(United States) Kelly Petillo R		

=== Alternates ===
- First alternate: George Howie
- Second alternate: James Patterson

=== Failed to qualify ===
- Gene Haustein – Incomplete run
- Milton Jones – Practice crash (fatal)
- Paul Rice – Broken axle in practice
- Roy Painter – Withdrew
- Bennie Benefiel – Practice crash
- Mauri Rose – Practice crash
- Dusty Fahrnow
- Freddie Winnai
- A. C. Aiken
- Arvol Brunmeier
- Buddy Calloway
- Danny Day
- Fred Clemons
- L. L. Corum
- Leon DeHart
- Leon Duray
- Sam Grecco
- William Gardner
- Harry Hunt
- George Kalen
- Edward Leipert
- Barney McKenna
- Fred Merzney
- Jack Mertz
- Milt Marion
- Al Theisen
- Marion Trexler
- George Wingerter
- Larry Wall
- Sam Ross

== Race summary ==
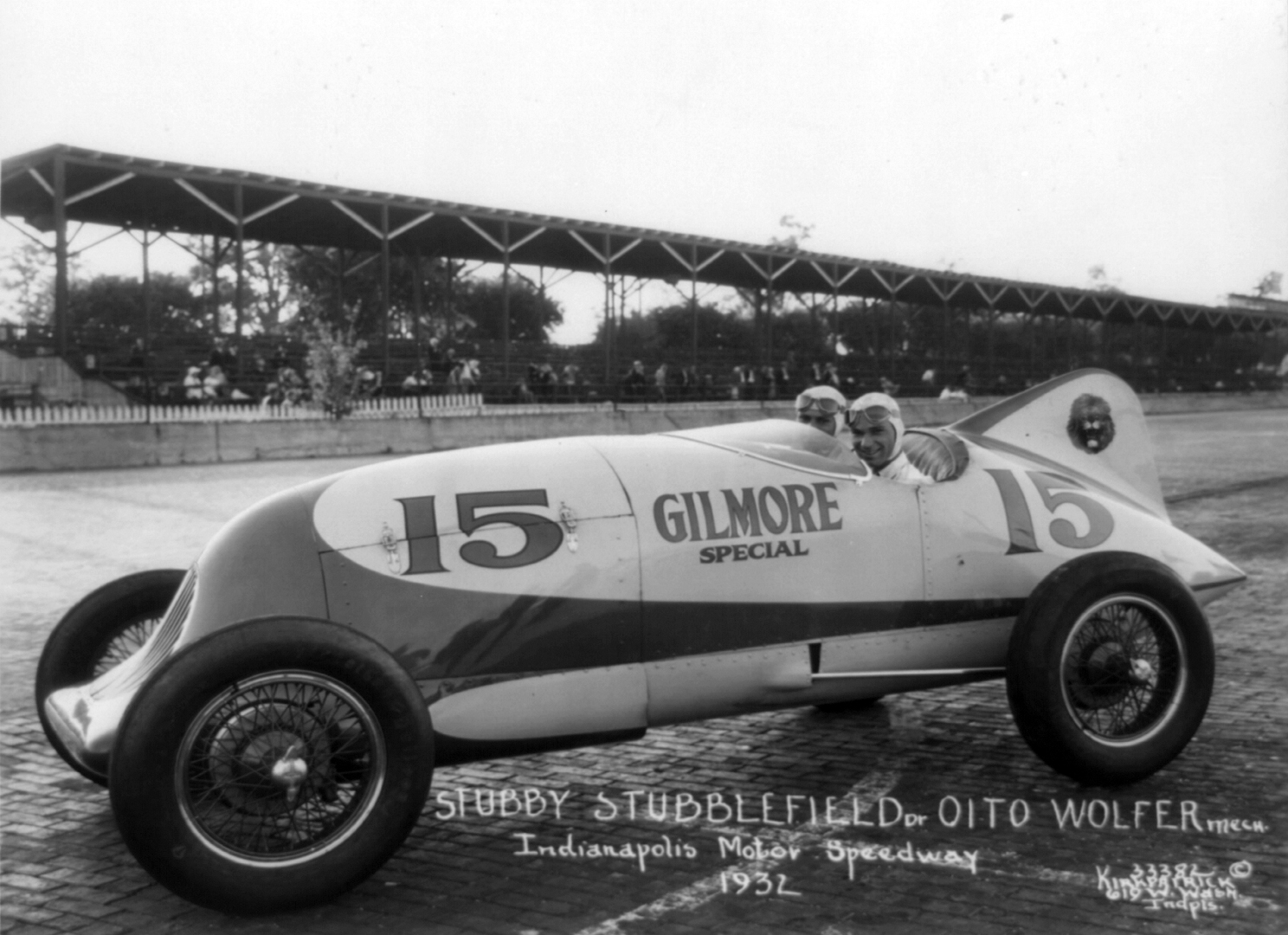
Stubby Stubblefield and mechanic Oito Wolfer.

=== Start ===
The race began at 10:00 a.m. with Edsel Ford driving the Lincoln Model KB pace car and Theodore E. "Pop" Meyers riding along, marshaling the start. Honorary starter Gar Wood joined Seth Kline to wave the green flag. At the start, Lou Moore took the lead into turn one from the pole position. Billy Arnold was second, Billy Winn third, and Ernie Triplett fourth. Arnold took the lead on the second lap, and began setting the pace. Arnold's average speed after 10 laps was 110.250 mph, breaking the previous record set in 1928.

On lap 3, Al Gordon crashed over the outside wall in turn 4. Stubby Stubblefield sideswiped Gordon, but was able to continue Gordon and his riding mechanic were uninjured. Also crashing out on lap 7 was Gus Schrader.

=== First half ===
Attrition started to mount early with several cars dropping out in the first 100 miles. Several other cars were into the pits with early tire wear, and Joe Huff needed a three-minute pit stop to repair a leaking radiator cap.

At the 50-mile mark, Billy Arnold led Lou Moore by 49 seconds. By the 100-mark, the lead had stretched to a minute and 18 seconds, and Bob Carey had moved up to second. By lap 50, Arnold had lapped the entire field except for Carey, and was running a record pace.

On lap 59, Billy Arnold's day came to end in a bad crash in turn 3. Arnold and riding mechanic Spider Matlock crashed over the wall while leading. Arnold suffered a broken shoulder and Matlock a broken pelvis – injuries similar (but opposite) to those suffered by them in a crash a year earlier. Arnold would retire from racing after the crash. The incident put Bob Carey in the lead from lap 59–94. After the race, Arnold found out that his grandmother had died the day before the race.

Carey led Lou Moore as the race passed the 200-mile distance. The race was still running at a record-shattering pace. Moore dropped out with bad timing gears, and Ernie Triplett moved up to second. On lap 94, Carey hit the outside wall in turn 4 while leading, spun around three times, and drove the car back to the pits with a damaged left front wheel. He lost ten minutes in the pits, and that handed the lead to Ernie Triplett.

Also in the pits was 8th place Fred Frame, who had water boiling from the radiator. Frame was about four laps down, and was in the pits for about one minute.

=== Second half ===
At the halfway point, Ernie Triplett led Howdy Wilcox II, Louis Schneider and Cliff Bergere. Triplett's time in front was short-lived. Ira Hall took the lead on lap 110, and Triplett dropped out after 125 laps with a failed clutch. Schneider dropped out at the same time with a broken frame.

With contenders dropping out in quick succession, Fred Frame came to the lead on lap 126. Frame led Wilbur Shaw, the only other car on the lead lap. Howdy Wilcox II and Cliff Bergere were running 3rd-4th one lap down.

As the race reached the 400-mile mark, Frame continued to lead. Wilbur Shaw lost over nine minutes after stalling his car in the pits then eventually dropped out with a broken axle. Frame was now all alone out front, and controlled the race to the finish. In the final 20 laps, Frame held an over 40-second lead over Howdy Wilcox II, with Cliff Bergere in third.

=== Finish ===
Late in the race, three incidents brought attention. On lap 182, Ira Hall blew a tire, spun and brushed the wall in the south end of the track. He was able to continue, but left his riding mechanic behind when he limped back to the pits. He re-joined the race, and was issued a one-lap penalty for driving off without the riding mechanic. He completed the 500 miles in 7th place. Luther Johnson lost a wheel on the mainstretch, and Tony Gulotta blew a tire in turn one. Gulotta's tire flung off the wheel, and nearly went over the fence into the stands. On the 178th lap, Pete Kreis skidded and crashed on the mainstretch.

Fred Frame led 58 of the final 75 laps and won the race by 44 seconds over Howdy Wilcox II. After strong showings in previous years, Frame, accompanied by riding mechanic Jerry Houck won with an average speed of 104.144 mph (167.604 km/h), a time that broke the seven-year-old record set by Peter DePaolo (1925). Frame charged from 27th starting position, aided by high attrition and a steady pace. It was the furthest back at that time that any driver had won the race except for Ray Harroun in 1911. Louis Meyer would equal Ray Harroun's furthest back to win (28th) in 1936. Frame's drive was not without incident, as he required six pit stops, each time taking on water to battle an overheating engine.

Source: The Indianapolis News

== Box score ==
Finish	Start	No	Name	Entrant	Chassis	Engine	Qual	Rank	Laps	Status
1	27	34	(United States) Fred Frame	Harry Hartz	Wetteroth	Miller	113.856	8	200	104.144 mph
2	6	6	(United States) Howdy Wilcox II R	William Cantlon	Stevens	Miller	113.468	9	200	+43.66
3	10	22	(United States) Cliff Bergere	The Studebaker Corporation	Rigling	Studebaker	111.503	16	200	+4:09.63
4	14	61	(United States) Bob Carey R	Louis Meyer	Stevens	Miller	111.070	22	200	+7:54.11
5	4	4	(United States) Russ Snowberger	Russell Snowberger	Snowberger	Hupmobile	114.326	6	200	+9:34.93
6	38	37	(United States) Zeke Meyer	The Studebaker Corporation	Rigling	Studebaker	110.745	24	200	+16:34.73
7	5	35	(United States) Ira Hall (Eddie Meyer Laps 115–124)	G. B. Hall	Stevens	Duesenberg	114.206	7	200	+17:24.93
8	35	65	(United States) Freddie Winnai	Henry Maley	Duesenberg	Duesenberg	108.755	36	200	+19:49.70
9	9	2	(United States) Billy Winn (James Patterson Laps 98–200)	Fred Frame	Duesenberg	Duesenberg	111.801	15	200	+19:52.64
10	15	55	(United States) Joe Huff (Dusty Fahrnow Laps 99–155)	S. C. Goldberg	Duesenberg	Duesenberg	110.402	27	200	+54:27.42
11	26	33	(United States) Phil Shafer	Phil Shafer	Rigling	Buick	110.708	25	197	Flagged
12	40	36	(United States) Kelly Petillo R	Milton Jones	Whippet	Miller	104.645	40	189	Flagged
13	20	25	(United States) Tony Gulotta	The Studebaker Corporation	Rigling	Studebaker	108.896	34	184	Flagged
14	25	15	(United States) Stubby Stubblefield	Sparks & Weirick	Adams	Miller	112.899	11	178	Flagged
15	17	18	(United States) Pete Kreis	The Studebaker Corporation	Rigling	Studebaker	110.270	29	178	Crash T1
16	11	46	(United States) Luther Johnson	The Studebaker Corporation	Rigling	Studebaker	111.218	18	164	Lost wheel FS
17	22	3	(United States) Wilbur Shaw	Ralph Hepburn	Miller	Miller	114.326	5	157	Rear axle
18	19	24	(United States) Deacon Litz	John Rutner	Duesenberg	Duesenberg	109.546	31	152	Rod
19	12	10	(United States) Bill Cummings (Frank Brisko Laps 106–128)	B. L. Schneider	Stevens	Miller	111.204	19	151	Crankshaft
20	32	57	(United States) Malcolm Fox R	William H. Richards	Studebaker	Studebaker	111.149	20	132	Spring
21	29	9	(United States) Chet Miller (Al Miller Laps 101–125)	R. G. "Buddy" Marr	Hudson	Hudson	111.053	23	125	Engine
22	31	7	(United States) Ernie Triplett	William S. White	Miller	Miller	114.935	3	125	Clutch
23	30	1	(United States) Louis Schneider W (Bill Cummings Laps 110–118)	B. L. Schneider	Stevens	Miller	110.681	26	125	Frame
24	21	41	(United States) Joe Russo	George A. Henry	Rigling	Duesenberg	108.791	35	107	Rod
25	1	8	(United States) Lou Moore	M. J. Boyle	Miller	Miller	117.363	1	79	Timing gear
26	36	14	(Argentina) Juan Gaudino R (Joseph Bonadeo Laps 65–69)	Juan Gaudino	Chrysler	Chrysler	107.466	39	71	Clutch
27	18	29	(United States) Al Miller R	R. G. "Buddy" Marr	Hudson	Hudson	110.129	30	66	Engine
28	39	42	(United States) Doc MacKenzie R	Ray T. Brady	Studebaker	Studebaker	108.154	37	65	Engine
29	13	32	(United States) Frank Brisko	F. Brisko & D. Atkinson	Stevens	Miller	111.149	21	61	Clutch
30	34	72	(United States) Ray Campbell R	E. D. Stairs Jr.	Graham	Graham	108.969	33	60	Crankshaft
31	2	5	(United States) Billy Arnold W	Harry Hartz	Summers	Miller	116.290	2	59	Crash T3
32	3	27	(United States) Bryan Saulpaugh R	William S. White	Miller	Miller	114.369	4	55	Oil line
33	7	16	(United States) Louis Meyer W	Alden Sampson II	Stevens	Miller	112.471	12	50	Crankshaft
34	23	21	(United States) Al Aspen	G. Nardi & Ray Brady	Duesenberg	Studebaker	108.008	38	31	Rod
35	33	49	(United States) Johnny Krieger R	Fred P. Duesenberg	Duesenberg	Duesenberg	109.276	32	30	Rod
36	16	48	(United States) Wesley Crawford	M. J. Boyle	Miller	Duesenberg	110.396	28	28	Crankshaft
37	8	17	(United States) Paul Bost	Paul B. Bost	Cooper	Miller	111.885	14	18	Crankshaft
38	24	58	(United States) Bob McDonogh	Four Wheel Drive Auto Company	Miller	Miller	113.276	10	17	Oil line
39	28	45	(United States) Gus Schrader R	William Burden	Miller	Miller	112.003	13	7	Crash T4
40	37	26	(United States) Al Gordon R	G. D. Harrison	Miller	Miller	111.290	17	3	Crash T4

Note: Relief drivers in parentheses

W Former Indianapolis 500 winner

R Indianapolis 500 Rookie

=== Statistics ===
Lap Leaders
Laps	Leader
1	Lou Moore
2–58	Billy Arnold
59–94	Bob Carey
95–108	Ernie Triplett
109	Howdy Wilcox II
110–115	Ira Hall
116–125	Wilbur Shaw
126–134	Fred Frame
135–151	Wilbur Shaw
152–200	Fred Frame

Total laps led
Laps	Leader
Fred Frame	58
Billy Arnold	57
Bob Carey	36
Wilbur Shaw	27
Ernie Triplett	14
Ira Hall	6
Lou Moore	1
Howdy Wilcox II	1

- For 1932, riding mechanics were required.

== Notes ==
=== See also ===
- 1932 AAA Championship Car season

=== Works cited ===
- Indianapolis 500 Historical Stats: 1932
- ChampCarStats.com - 1932 International 500 Mile Sweepstakes

=== References ===
1931 Indianapolis 500; Louis Schneider	1932 Indianapolis 500; Fred Frame	1933 Indianapolis 500; Louis Meyer
Preceded by 101.127 mph (1925 Indianapolis 500)	Record for the fastest average speed 104.144 mph	Succeeded by 104.162 mph (1933 Indianapolis 500)
