= Lester Spangler =

American racing driver (1906–1933)

Les Spangler
- Born: Lester Spangler; January 15, 1906 Brook, Indiana, U.S.
- Died: May 30, 1933 (aged 27) Speedway, Indiana, U.S.

Champ Car career
- 2 races run over 2 years
- First race: 1932 Oakland 150 (Oakland)
- Last race: 1933 Indianapolis 500 (Indianapolis)
Wins	Podiums	Poles
0	0	0

Lester Spangler (January 15, 1906 – May 30, 1933) was an American racing driver. Spangler raced with great success at Los Angeles' Legion Ascot Speedway, which led him to move up to AAA Championship Car racing.

== Death ==
Spangler and his riding mechanic Monk Jordan died in Speedway, Indiana, while competing in the 1933 Indianapolis 500. With Spangler on the 132nd lap, the car driven by Malcolm Fox spun coming out of turn one, and was rolling slowly towards the top the track. Spangler tried to get by on the outside, but ran out of room and hit Fox head on. Spangler's car rolled over while still maintaining speed, ejecting the driver and mechanic.

The race was Spangler's second AAA Championship Car start, having made his debut at the Oakland Speedway the previous year.

== Motorsports career results ==
=== Indianapolis 500 results ===
Year	Car	Start	Qual	Rank	Finish	Laps	Led	Retired
1933	15	7	116.903	8	26	132	0	Crash T1
Totals						132	0	

Starts	1
Poles	0
Front Row	0
Wins	0
Top 5	0
Top 10	0
Retired	1
