= 1904 in motorsport =

The following is an overview of the events of 1904 in motorsport including the major racing events, motorsport venues that were opened and closed during a year, championships and non-championship events that were established and disestablished in a year, and births and deaths of racing drivers and other motorsport people.

== Births ==
Date	Month	Name	Nationality	Occupation	Note	Ref
21	July	Louis Meyer	American	Racing driver	Indianapolis 500 winner (1928, 1933, 1936).	
8	October	Yves Giraud-Cabantous	French	Racing driver	One of the first French Formula One drivers.	
