= Bryan Saulpaugh =

American racing driver (1906–1933)

- Born: William Bryan Saulpaugh; March 24, 1906 Taylor Ridge, Illinois, U.S.
- Died: April 22, 1933 (aged 27) Oakland, California, U.S.

Championship titles
- AAA Eastern Big Car (1932)

Champ Car career
- 3 races run over 2 years
- Best finish: 19th (tie) (1932)
- First race: 1932 Indianapolis 500 (Indianapolis)
- Last race: 1932 Oakland 150 (Oakland)
Wins	Podiums	Poles
0	0	0

William Bryan Saulpaugh (March 24, 1906 – April 22, 1933) was an American racing driver.

== Biography ==
Saulpaugh was born 1906 in Taylor Ridge, Illinois, to Frederik U. Saulpaugh and Giralda M. Mosher. He died on April 22, 1933, in Oakland, California.

Saulpaugh relieved Chet Miller in the 1931 Indianapolis 500 for 49 laps and qualified for the 1932 race in a Miller in the third position but was knocked out after 55 laps by a broken oil line and was credited with 32nd. He made two other National Championship starts that season and finished 19th in the championship. He was the Eastern champion in 1932. He was killed by a crash in a sprint car race in Oakland, California.

== Awards and honors ==
Saulpaugh was inducted into the National Sprint Car Hall of Fame in 2004.

== Motorsports career results ==
=== Indianapolis 500 results ===
Year	Car	Start	Qual	Rank	Finish	Laps	Led	Retired
1932	27	3	114.369	4	32	55	0	Oil line
Totals						55	0	

Starts	1
Poles	0
Front Row	1
Wins	0
Top 5	0
Top 10	0
Retired	1
