= Malcolm Fox =

Malcolm Fox may refer to:

- Malcolm Fox (racing driver), American racing driver
- Malcolm Fox (tennis), American tennis player
- Malcolm Fox (detective), a fictional Scottish detective
