= 1933 Indianapolis 500 =

American motor race

21st Indianapolis 500

Indianapolis Motor Speedway

Indianapolis 500
- Sanctioning body: AAA
- Date: May 30, 1933
- Winner: Louis Meyer
- Winning Riding Mechanic: Lawson Harris
- Winning Entrant: Tydol-Meyer
- Winning time: 4:48:00.75
- Average speed: 104.162 mph
- Pole position: Bill Cummings
- Pole speed: 118.530 mph
- Most laps led: Louis Meyer (71)

Pre-race
- Pace car: Chrysler Imperial
- Pace car driver: Byron Foy
- Starter: Roscoe Turner
- Honorary referee: Larry P. Fisher
- Estimated attendance: 100,000

Chronology
Previous	Next
1932	1934

The 21st International 500-Mile Sweepstakes Race was held at the Indianapolis Motor Speedway on Tuesday, May 30, 1933. Louis Meyer defeated Wilbur Shaw by a time of 401.89 seconds (6.69 minutes). The average speed of the race was 104.162 miles per hour (167.632 km/h) while Bill Cummings achieved the pole position with a speed of 118.521 miles per hour (190.741 km/h). The race was part of the 1933 AAA Championship Car season.

Meyer was accompanied by riding mechanic Lawson Harris.

The 1933 month of May at Indianapolis was the deadliest running of the 500. Five participants were fatally injured. During practice, Bill Denver and his riding mechanic Bob Hurst were killed in a crash. On race day, Mark Billman was killed in a crash on lap 79 while Lester Spangler and his riding mechanic G.L. "Monk" Jordan were killed in a crash on lap 132. It was the fifth straight year at least one competitor died in a crash during the month.

== Time trials ==
Ten-lap (25 mile) qualifying runs were utilized. 42 cars averaged faster than the designated 100 mph mark, making for the largest starting field in the race's history.

== Starting grid ==
Row	Inside		Middle		Outside	
1	5	(United States) Bill Cummings	58	(United States) Frank Brisko	12	(United States) Fred Frame W
2	37	(United States) Lou Moore	16	(United States) Ernie Triplett	36	(United States) Louis Meyer W
3	15	(United States) Lester Spangler R	10	(United States) Ira Hall	6	(United States) Cliff Bergere
4	8	(United States) Stubby Stubblefield	2	(United States) Pete Kreis	34	(United States) Tony Gulotta
5	25	(United States) Shorty Cantlon	26	(United States) Deacon Litz	21	(United States) Chet Gardner
6	9	(United States) Zeke Meyer	4	(United States) Russ Snowberger	47	(United States) L. L. Corum W
7	68	(United States) Bennett Hill	46	(United States) Luther Johnson	22	(United States) Louis Schneider W
8	64	(United States) Mark Billman R	17	(United States) Wilbur Shaw	19	(United States) Al Miller
9	27	(United States) Kelly Petillo	32	(United States) Wesley Crawford	14	(Argentina) Raúl Riganti
10	29	(United States) Gene Haustein	45	(United States) Babe Stapp	57	(United States) Malcolm Fox
11	18	(United States) Joe Russo	28	(United States) Chet Miller	24	(United States) Paul Bost
12	53	(United States) Johnny Sawyer R	65	(United States) Freddie Winnai	38	(United States) Dave Evans
13	59	(United States) Ray Campbell	61	(United States) Rick Decker	51	(United States) Doc MacKenzie
14	49	(United States) Willard Prentiss R	23	(United States) Ralph Hepburn	3	(United States) Mauri Rose R

R Indianapolis 500 rookie
W Indianapolis 500 winner

=== Alternates ===
- First alternate: Sam Palmer R
- Howdy Wilcox II had qualified for the race, but officials disqualified him from the field when they learned that he had diabetes. On race day, he was replaced in the car by Mauri Rose.

=== Failed to Qualify ===
- Al Aspen (#42)
- George Barringer (#54)
- Paul Butler (#56)
- Ray Carter R (#63)
- Terry Curley R (#66)
- Frank Davidson R (#76)
- Danny Day R
- Leon DeHart R (#55)
- Bill Denver (#42) - Fatal accident
- Harry Falt R (#71)
- Speed Gardner (#31)
- George Howie (#48) - Withdrew
- L. A. Lariviere R (#75)
- Harry Lewis R (#44)
- Virgil Livengood R (#69)
- Jack Mertz R (#79)
- Roy Painter R (#72)
- Phil Shafer (#7)
- Overton Snell R (#52)
- Bill Sockwell R (#74)
- Howdy Wilcox II (#3) - Replaced by Mauri Rose
- Doc Williams R (#66)

== Race summary ==
Bill Cummings led early on from the pole, turning laps of 113 mph. He faded from the front and dropped out with mechanical problems. Louis Meyer came from 7th starting position to first lead at 325 miles. By 400 miles, he had a commanding lead and was signaled "E-Z" by his pit crew to slow from his 110 mph pace. He cruised to the checkered with a lead of over 5 laps over Wilbur Shaw, with a new record average speed.

== Box score ==
Finish	Start	No	Name	Entrant	Chassis	Engine	Qual	Rank	Laps	Status
1	6	36	(United States) Louis Meyer W	Louis Meyer	Miller	Miller	116.977	7	200	104.162 mph
2	23	17	(United States) Wilbur Shaw	Leon Duray	Stevens	Miller	115.497	12	200	+6:41.89
3	4	37	(United States) Lou Moore	Maley & Scully	Duesenberg	Miller	117.843	4	200	+7:16.04
4	15	21	(United States) Chet Gardner	Alden Sampson II	Stevens	Miller	112.319	22	200	+8:28.96
5	10	8	(United States) Stubby Stubblefield	Phil Shafer	Rigling	Buick	114.784	13	200	+9:43.07
6	36	38	(United States) Dave Evans	Arthur E. Rose	Rigling	Studebaker	109.448	36	200	+10:43.07
7	12	34	(United States) Tony Gulotta	The Studebaker Corporation	Rigling	Studebaker	113.578	15	200	+14:58.00
8	17	4	(United States) Russ Snowberger (George Howie Laps 110–115) (Mauri Rose Laps 116–200)	Russell Snowberger	Snowberger	Studebaker	110.769	27	200	+14:59.09
9	16	9	(United States) Zeke Meyer	The Studebaker Corporation	Rigling	Studebaker	111.099	25	200	+17:43.74
10	20	46	(United States) Luther Johnson (Ralph Hepburn Laps 116–147) (Sam Palmer Laps 148–200)	The Studebaker Corporation	Rigling	Studebaker	110.097	31	200	+20:21.47
11	9	6	(United States) Cliff Bergere (Sam Palmer Laps 83–120)	The Studebaker Corporation	Rigling	Studebaker	115.643	11	200	+22:39.63
12	18	47	(United States) L. L. Corum W	The Studebaker Corporation	Rigling	Studebaker	110.465	29	200	+22:48.64
13	40	49	(United States) Willard Prentiss R (Harold Shaw Laps 145–146)	J. W. Kleinschmidt	Rigling	Duesenberg	107.776	41	200	+32:31.08
14	27	14	(Argentina) Raúl Riganti (Juan Gaudino Laps 120–140) (Juan Gaudino Laps 158–174)	Raúl Riganti	Chrysler	Chrysler	108.081	39	200	+33:43.38
15	28	29	(United States) Gene Haustein	Lawrence J. Martz	Hudson	Hudson	107.603	42	197	Flagged
16	14	26	(United States) Deacon Litz (Louis Schneider Laps 50–97) (Louis Schneider Laps 153–197)	A. B. Litz	Miller	Miller	113.138	17	197	Flagged
17	31	18	(United States) Joe Russo	F. P. Duesenberg	Duesenberg	Duesenberg	112.531	20	192	Flagged
18	39	51	(United States) Doc MacKenzie	Ray T. Brady	Duesenberg	Studebaker	108.073	40	192	Rear axle
19	25	27	(United States) Kelly Petillo	William M. Yahr	Smith	Miller	113.037	18	168	Spun & stalled
20	32	28	(United States) Chet Miller (Shorty Cantlon Laps 102–145)	R. G. "Buddy" Marr	Hudson	Hudson	112.025	23	163	Rod
21	24	19	(United States) Al Miller	R. G. "Buddy" Marr	Hudson	Hudson	109.799	35	161	Rod
22	19	68	(United States) Bennett Hill (Frank Brisko Laps 110–130)	S. C. Goldberg	Cooper	Cooper	110.264	30	158	Rod
23	29	45	(United States) Babe Stapp	M. J. Boyle	Miller	Miller	116.626	9	156	Out of gas
24	26	32	(United States) Wesley Crawford (Billy Winn Laps 122–147)	Frank Brisko	Stevens	Miller	109.862	33	147	Crash T1
25	1	5	(United States) Bill Cummings (Frank Brisko Laps 113–120)	M. J. Boyle	Miller	Miller	118.521	1	136	Radiator
26	7	15	(United States) Lester Spangler R ✝	Harry Hartz	Miller	Miller	116.903	8	132	Died in crash at T1
27	35	65	(United States) Freddie Winnai (Terry Curley Laps 100–104)	James Kemp	Duesenberg	Duesenberg	111.018	26	125	Engine trouble
28	30	57	(United States) Malcolm Fox	William Richards	Studebaker	Studebaker	112.922	19	121	Crash T1
29	3	12	(United States) Fred Frame W	Harry Hartz	Wetteroth	Miller	117.864	3	85	Valve
30	22	64	(United States) Mark Billman R ✝	James Kemp	Duesenberg	Duesenberg	112.410	21	79	Died in crash at T2
31	34	53	(United States) Johnny Sawyer R	Lencki & Unger	Miller	Miller	110.590	28	77	Clutch
32	11	2	(United States) Pete Kreis	Fred Frame	Summers	Miller	114.370	14	63	Universal joint
33	5	16	(United States) Ernie Triplett	William S. White	Weil	Miller	117.685	5	61	Piston
34	13	25	(United States) Shorty Cantlon	William Cantlon	Stevens	Miller	113.384	16	50	Rod
35	42	3	(United States) Mauri Rose R	Joe Marks	Stevens	Miller	117.649	6	48	Timing gears
36	2	58	(United States) Frank Brisko	F.W.D. Auto Company	Miller	Miller	118.388	2	47	Oil too hot
37	8	10	(United States) Ira Hall	Denny Duesenberg	Stevens	Duesenberg	115.739	10	37	Piston
38	41	23	(United States) Ralph Hepburn	S. C. Goldberg	Cooper	Cooper	110.001	32	33	Rod bearing
39	37	59	(United States) Ray Campbell	Tulio Gulotta	Hudson	Hudson	108.650	37	24	Oil leak
40	33	24	(United States) Paul Bost	Fred Frame	Duesenberg	Miller	111.330	24	13	Oil line
41	38	61	(United States) Rick Decker	Bessie Decker	Miller	Miller	108.280	38	13	Manifold
42	21	22	(United States) Louis Schneider W	W. R. Blackburn	Stevens	Miller	109.850	34	1	Stalled

Note: Relief drivers in parentheses

W Former Indianapolis 500 winner

R Indianapolis 500 Rookie

=== Race statistics ===
Lap Leaders
Laps	Leader
1–32	Bill Cummings
33–36	Fred Frame
37–38	Babe Stapp
39–50	Fred Frame
51–63	Babe Stapp
64–84	Fred Frame
85–129	Babe Stapp
130–200	Louis Meyer

Total laps led
Driver	Laps
Louis Meyer	71
Babe Stapp	60
Fred Frame	37
Bill Cummings	32

== Race details ==
For 1933, riding mechanics were required.

Despite the deadly month, three rules were installed to make the racing safer. Cars were allowed a maximum of 6 quarts of oil, and could not add oil during the race (a rule still in place today). These changes meant to send "leakers" to the garage and not make the track slippery. Also, fuel tanks were a maximum of 15 gallons, instead of 40 gallons or more. Cars would have to pit more often for fuel and crews could inspect tire wear and other problems.

=== "Will Overhead" ===
In 1933, one of the more famous bits of Indy 500 nostalgia occurred. Telegraph was still being used to transmit race information to newspapers and other outlets across the United States. George Zanaon, a typesetter for The World-Independent newspaper in the town of Walsenburg, Colorado was preparing a story for that day's Indianapolis 500. Since Memorial Day was a holiday, his young editor John B. Kirkpatrick was alone monitoring the Associated Press wire for race updates. The race took several hours to complete, and the AP wire was shut down prior to the finish. Kirkpatrick had nearly the entire story ready for print, minus the winner of the race. A helpful AP editor in Denver advised him that he would send the name of the winner via Western Union telegraph.

The telegraph Kirkpatrick received, in typical newspaper shorthand lingo was: "WILL OVERHEAD WINNER OF INDIANAPOLIS 500," meaning that he would send the information by telegraph when the information was available. The young editor misunderstood the jargon in the message, and interpreted it as saying a driver named Will Overhead was the winner. The headline read "Will Overhead won the Indianapolis Memorial Day race today. At the two hundred fifty mile post Babe Stapp was leading the string of racing cars, but gave way to Overhead on the last half of the 500 mile grind." The true winner was Louis Meyer. The gaffe put the town of Walsenburg, and The World-Independent newspaper (now known as the Huerfano World Journal), on the map in racing circles.

1932 Indianapolis 500; Fred Frame	1933 Indianapolis 500; Louis Meyer	1934 Indianapolis 500; Bill Cummings
Preceded by 104.144 mph (1932 Indianapolis 500)	Record for the fastest average speed 104.162 mph	Succeeded by 104.863 mph (1934 Indianapolis 500)
