= 1936 Indianapolis 500 =

American motor race

24th Indianapolis 500
Indianapolis Motor Speedway

Indianapolis 500
- Sanctioning body: AAA
- Date: May 30, 1936
- Winner: Louis Meyer
- Winning Riding Mechanic: Lawson Harris
- Winning Entrant: Louis Meyer
- Winning time: 4:35:03.39
- Average speed: 109.069 mph
- Pole position: Rex Mays
- Pole speed: 119.644 mph
- Most laps led: Louis Meyer (96)

Pre-race
- Pace car: Packard 120
- Pace car driver: Tommy Milton
- Starter: Seth Klein
- Honorary referee: Ralph DePalma
- Estimated attendance: 170,000

Chronology
Previous	Next
1935	1937

The 24th International 500-Mile Sweepstakes Race was held at the Indianapolis Motor Speedway on Saturday, May 30, 1936. The race was part of the 1936 AAA Championship Car season. The race is remembered for three noteworthy Indy traditions getting their start.

Louis Meyer became the first three-time winner of the Indianapolis 500. He notably celebrated in victory lane with a bottle of buttermilk, which later started the famous tradition of serving milk in victory lane at Indianapolis.

Lawson Harris served as Meyer's riding mechanic. Harris, who also rode with Meyer in 1933, became the first two-time Indianapolis 500 winning riding mechanic.

The Borg-Warner Trophy debuted for the winner in 1936. Also, pace car driver Tommy Milton suggested that the race winner should be awarded the official pace car as part of his complement of prizes. Louis Meyer was given the keys to the Packard after the race, and it has been a tradition ever since (with only a handful of exceptions).

== Time trials ==
Ten-lap (25 mile) qualifying runs were utilized. Rex Mays won the pole position for the second consecutive year.

Qualifying Results
Date	Driver	Lap 1 (mph)	Lap 2 (mph)	Lap 3 (mph)	Lap 4 (mph)	Lap 5 (mph)	Lap 6 (mph)	Lap 7 (mph)	Lap 8 (mph)	Lap 9 (mph)	Lap 10 (mph)	Average Speed (mph)
Sat 5/16/1936	Rex Mays	119.745	119.348	118.743	119.968	121.065	119.984	120.289	119.697	119.253	118.985	119.644

== Starting grid ==
Row	Inside		Middle		Outside	
1	33	(United States) Rex Mays	21	(United States) Babe Stapp	18	(United States) Chet Miller
2	10	(United States) Doc MacKenzie	38	(United States) George Connor	44	(United States) Herb Ardinger
3	42	(United States) Cliff Bergere	27	(United States) Louis Tomei	3	(United States) Wilbur Shaw
4	7	(United States) Shorty Cantlon	22	(United States) Ted Horn	35	(United States) Freddie Winnai
5	2	(United States) Bill Cummings W	17	(United States) George Barringer	4	(United States) Floyd Roberts
6	43	(United States) Jimmy Snyder	12	(United States) Al Miller	6	(United States) Chet Gardner
7	5	(United States) Billy Winn	14	(United States) Frank Brisko	47	(United States) Johnny Seymour
8	52	(United States) Frank McGurk R	54	(United States) Doc Williams R	9	(United States) Ralph Hepburn
9	41	(United States) Ray Pixley R	15	(United States) Deacon Litz	28	(United States) Harry McQuinn
10	8	(United States) Louis Meyer W	32	(United States) Lou Moore	36	(United States) Mauri Rose
11	46	(United States) Fred Frame W	53	(United States) Zeke Meyer	19	(United States) Emil Andres R

R Indianapolis 500 rookie
W Indianapolis 500 winner

=== Alternates ===
- First alternate: Al Putman R

=== Failed to Qualify ===
- George Bailey (#51)
- Henry Banks R (#29)
- Rick Decker (#44)
- Dave Evans (#25)
- Dusty Fahrnow (#55)
- Tony Gulotta (#31, #56)
- Harry Hunt R (#58)
- Luther Johnson (#49) - Withdrew
- Roy Painter R (#34)
- Kelly Petillo W (#10)
- Phil Shafer (#26)
- Overton Snell R (#24)
- Russ Snowberger (#23)
- Lucky Teter R - Did not appear
- Joel Thorne R - Did not appear
- George Wingerter (#57)

== Box score ==
Finish	Start	No	Name	Entrant	Chassis	Engine	Qual	Rank	Laps	Status
1	28	8	(United States) Louis Meyer W	Louis Meyer	Stevens	Miller	114.171	18	200	109.069 mph
2	11	22	(United States) Ted Horn	Harry Hartz	Wetteroth	Miller	116.564	8	200	+2:17.15
3	4	10	(United States) Doc MacKenzie (Kelly Petillo Laps 142–200)	Kelly Petillo	Wetteroth	Offenhauser	116.961	5	200	+4:06.97
4	30	36	(United States) Mauri Rose	Four Wheel Drive Auto Company	Miller	Miller	113.890	21	200	+4:36.46
5	3	18	(United States) Chet Miller	Boyle Motor Products	Summers	Miller	117.675	3	200	+5:31.78
6	25	41	(United States) Ray Pixley R	Clarence Felker	Miller	Miller	116.703	7	200	+9:58.19
7	9	3	(United States) Wilbur Shaw	W. Wilbur Shaw	Shaw	Offenhauser	117.503	4	200	+12:45.61
8	14	17	(United States) George Barringer	Phil Shafer	Rigling	Offenhauser	112.700	27	200	+17:15.26
9	32	53	(United States) Zeke Meyer	Boyle Motor Products	Cooper	Studebaker	111.476	30	200	+21:00.18
10	5	38	(United States) George Connor	Joe Marks	Adams	Miller	116.269	9	200	+28:11.10
11	12	35	(United States) Freddie Winnai	Midwest Racing Team	Stevens	Offenhauser	116.221	10	199	Flagged
12	24	9	(United States) Ralph Hepburn	Ralph Hepburn	Miller	Offenhauser	112.673	28	196	Flagged
13	27	28	(United States) Harry McQuinn	Alden Sampson II	Stevens	Miller	114.118	19	196	Out of gas
14	10	7	(United States) Shorty Cantlon	William S. White	Weil	Miller	116.912	6	194	Out of gas
15	1	33	(United States) Rex Mays	Paul Weirick	Adams	Sparks	119.644	1	192	Out of gas
16	23	54	(United States) Doc Williams R	Race Car Corporation	Cooper	Miller	112.837	26	192	Out of gas
17	29	32	(United States) Lou Moore (Cliff Bergere Laps 77–134)	Lou Moore	Miller	Offenhauser	113.996	20	185	Out of gas
18	33	19	(United States) Emil Andres R (Jimmy Snyder Laps 51–112)	J. Stewart Carew	Whippet	Cragar	111.455	31	184	Flagged
19	15	4	(United States) Floyd Roberts	Joe Lencki	Stevens	Offenhauser	112.403	29	183	Out of gas
20	20	14	(United States) Frank Brisko	Elgin Piston Ring Company	Miller	Brisko	114.213	17	180	Out of gas
21	17	12	(United States) Al Miller	Boyle Motor Products	Smith	Miller	116.138	11	119	Crash FS
22	7	42	(United States) Cliff Bergere (Tony Gulotta Laps 60–114) (Herb Ardinger Laps 115–116)	Bowes Seal Fast Corporation	Stevens	Miller	113.377	22	116	Engine support
23	26	15	(United States) Deacon Litz (Louis Tomei Laps 59–107)	A. B. Litz	Miller	Miller	115.997	13	108	Crankshaft
24	2	21	(United States) Babe Stapp	Gil Pirrung	Shaw	Offenhauser	118.945	2	89	Crankshaft
25	19	5	(United States) Billy Winn	James W. Winn	Miller	Miller	114.648	16	78	Crankshaft
26	22	52	(United States) Frank McGurk R	Charles Worley	Adams	Cragar	113.102	24	51	Crankshaft
27	8	27	(United States) Louis Tomei	Babe Stapp	Wetteroth	Miller	111.078	33	44	Engine support
28	6	44	(United States) Herb Ardinger	Bowes Seal Fast Corporation	Stevens	Miller	115.082	15	38	Transmission
29	18	6	(United States) Chet Gardner	Chester L. Gardner	Duesenberg	Offenhauser	116.000	12	38	Clutch
30	16	43	(United States) Jimmy Snyder	Murrell Belanger	Stevens	Miller	111.291	32	21	Oil leak
31	21	47	(United States) Johnny Seymour	William L. Cantlon	Stevens	Miller	113.169	23	13	Clutch
32	31	46	(United States) Fred Frame W	Moore & Fengler	Miller	Miller	112.877	25	4	Piston
33	13	2	(United States) Bill Cummings W	Boyle Motor Products	Miller	Offenhauser	115.939	14	0	Clutch

Note: Relief drivers in parentheses

W Former Indianapolis 500 winner

R Indianapolis 500 Rookie

=== Race statistics ===
Lap Leaders
Laps	Leader
1–12	Rex Mays
13–31	Babe Stapp
32–82	Wilbur Shaw
83–88	Babe Stapp
89–130	Louis Meyer
131–146	Ted Horn
147–200	Louis Meyer

Total laps led
Driver	Laps
Louis Meyer	96
Wilbur Shaw	51
Babe Stapp	25
Ted Horn	16
Rex Mays	12

Yellow Lights
Laps	Reason
119	Al Miller crash on frontstretch

== Race summary ==
To slow the cars, a fuel limit of 37.5 gallons of gasoline was implemented for the race distance. Engine tuners struggled to make their engines more efficient.

At the start, polesitter Rex Mays led but soon dropped out with a faulty throttle. Wilbur Shaw then took the lead, but lost time with a 17-minute pit stop to re-fasten loose rivets on his engine hood.

Louis Meyer steadily moved up through the field and took the lead by halfway. He pitted for fuel at 350 miles, allowing Ted Horn to take the point. But Meyer caught him, pulled away and became the first 3-time "500" winner. He wasn't sure his fuel would last until the end. He said, "That last lap, I held my breath."

- For 1936, riding mechanics were required.
- After numerous fatalities in the 1935 race, additional safety measures were introduced for 1936. All new drivers were required to pass a rookie test prior to qualifying. In addition, the inside wall was removed in several locations, the outside walls were angled inward to keep cars from going over them, and several portions of the track were paved over in asphalt. In a sharp contrast to previous years, the 1936 race saw zero fatalities amongst the competitors or spectators. It marked the only year from the span of 1929-1940 (the Depression Era) in which no fatalities occurred at the Speedway.
- Bill Cummings car failed to pull away from the grid due to clutch and transmission failure. He became the first driver in Indy history to line up for the grid, but fail to pull away and start the race.

1935 Indianapolis 500; Kelly Petillo	1936 Indianapolis 500; Louis Meyer	1937 Indianapolis 500; Wilbur Shaw
Preceded by 106.240 mph (1935 Indianapolis 500)	Record for the fastest average speed 109.069 mph	Succeeded by 113.580 mph (1937 Indianapolis 500)
