= Al Gordon (disambiguation) =

Al Gordon (born 1953) is an American comic book creator.

The name may also refer to:

- Al Gordon (racing driver) (1903–1936), American racing driver
- Al Gordon (screenwriter) (1923–2012), American television screenwriter
