= Harold Shaw (racing driver) =

American racing driver (1906–1941)

- Born: Harold Joseph Shaw; August 10, 1906 Frankfort, Indiana, U.S.
- Died: November 3, 1941 (aged 35) Crown Hill Cemetery and Arboretum, Indianapolis, Indiana, U.S.

Harold Joseph Shaw (August 10, 1906 – November 3, 1941) was an American racing driver.

== Career and death ==
Shaw drove in relief of Willard Prentiss for two laps during the 1933 Indianapolis 500. Shaw wanted to enter the 1934 race but his entry was refused. Primarily a sprint car driver, the 1933 Indianapolis 500 was his only Championship Car experience.

Having won the 1941 Midwest Dirt Track Racing Association (MDTRA) championship, Shaw died of injuries sustained while warming up for a sprint car race at the Johnson County Fairgrounds in Franklin, Indiana.

Shaw is buried at Crown Hill Cemetery and Arboretum in Section 96, Lot 473 in Indianapolis, Indiana.
