= Lou Moore =

American racing driver (1904–1956)

- Born: Lewis Henry Moore; September 12, 1904 Hinton, Oklahoma Territory, U.S.
- Died: March 25, 1956 (aged 51) Atlanta, Georgia, U.S.

Champ Car career
- 25 races run over 10 years
- Best finish: 2nd (1933)
- First race: 1928 Indianapolis 500 (Indianapolis)
- Last race: 1936 Indianapolis 500 (Indianapolis)
- First win: 1931 Altoona 100 (Altoona)
- Last win: 1931 Syracuse 100 (Syracuse)
Wins	Podiums	Poles
2	8	3

Lewis Henry Moore (September 12, 1904 – March 25, 1956) was an American racing driver and team owner. He was most known during his racing career for qualifying on the pole position for the 1932 Indianapolis 500. He was a five-time Indianapolis 500 winning owner, a record which stood until 1987.

== Early life and racing career ==
Moore was born in Oklahoma Territory on September 12, 1904. He moved with his family to California at a young age. He started his career on the dirt tracks of California in 1923. In 1926, he won 18 feature races out of 23 starts and had been in the lead of the other five when equipment failed. He drove in the Indianapolis 500 from 1928 to 1936. He finished second in 1928, started on the pole in 1932, and finished third in 1933 and 1934. He also drove in the 1934 Tripoli Grand Prix, starting tenth and finishing seventh.

== Team ownership ==
After his driving career ended in 1936, Moore became a competitive car owner. Moore-owned entries won the Indianapolis 500 five times: in 1938, 1941, 1947, 1948, and 1949. The final three from 1947-1949 was the first of to-date two occasions to see three consecutive victories by an owner. Drivers of Moore-owned cars included Mauri Rose, Bill Holland, Floyd Roberts, Tony Bettenhausen, Floyd Davis, Lee Wallard, George Connor and Cliff Bergere. Moore earned a reputation as a hard-nosed team owner who expected his drivers to follow orders. In 1949, Bill Holland led comfortably in one of the Blue Crown cars while Mauri Rose, in the other team car, gradually raised the race pace in preparation for a late-race challenge. Car owner Moore recognized what was happening and hung out the "HOLD POS" sign. Holland complied and eased off, but Rose ignored the signal, and with just eight laps to go, broke a magneto strap and retired. Holland cruised to an easy win and when Rose arrived back at the pits, Moore fired him on the spot.

== After racing ==
Moore retired from racing as an owner in 1953 following the on-track death of his friend, Chet Miller. In September 1955, Moore was put in charge of Pontiac's racing division. On March 25, 1956, Moore was taken to the hospital after complaining of a massive headache. He was pronounced dead shortly thereafter due to a brain hemorrhage.

== Motorsports career results ==
=== Indianapolis 500 results ===
Year	Car	Start	Qual	Rank	Finish	Laps	Led	Retired
1928	28	8	113.826	8	2	200	0	Running
1929	3	13	110.677	20	13	198	22	Rod
1930	14	12	99.867	20	29	23	0	Crash T3
1931	14	38	103.725	31	26	103	0	Differential
1932	8	1	117.363	1	25	79	1	Timing gear
1933	37	4	117.843	4	3	200	0	Running
1934	2	20	113.442	16	3	200	0	Running
1935	7	23	114.180	22	18	116	0	Rod
1936	32	29	113.996	20	17	185	0	Out of gas
Totals						1304	23	

Starts	9
Poles	1
Front Row	1
Wins	0
Top 5	3
Top 10	3
Retired	6
