= Mark Billman =

American racing driver (1905–1933)

- Born: Mark W. Billman; March 10, 1905 Indianapolis, Indiana, U.S.
- Died: May 30, 1933 (aged 28) Indianapolis, Indiana, U.S.

Champ Car career
- 1 race run over 1 year
- First race: 1933 Indianapolis 500 (Indianapolis)
Wins	Podiums	Poles
0	0	0

Mark W. Billman (March 10, 1905 – May 30, 1933) was an American racing driver. He was killed 79 laps into the 1933 Indianapolis 500, his only Championship Car start.

== Death ==
On his seventy-ninth lap of the 1933 Indianapolis 500, Billman in the Kemp-Mannix Special skidded on the southeast turn, hit the outside wall and finally came to rest with the car astride the wall. He was pinned between the left front wheel and the wall and it took 20 minutes to get him out. He suffered massive internal injuries, and died in hospital a short while later.

== Motorsports career results ==
=== Indianapolis 500 results ===
Year	Car	Start	Qual	Rank	Finish	Laps	Led	Retired
1933	64	22	112.410	21	30	79	0	Crash T2
Totals						79	0	

Starts	1
Poles	0
Front Row	0
Wins	0
Top 5	0
Top 10	0
Retired	1
