= Joe Huff =

American racing driver (1906–1971)

- Born: Joseph Henry Huff; March 21, 1906 Wayne, Indiana, U.S.
- Died: August 21, 1971 (aged 65) Indianapolis, Indiana, U.S.

Champ Car career
- 4 races run over 3 years
- Best finish: 24th (1932)
- First race: 1930 Indianapolis 500 (Indianapolis)
- Last race: 1932 Indianapolis 500 (Indianapolis)
Wins	Podiums	Poles
0	0	0

Joseph Henry Huff (March 21, 1906 – August 21, 1971) was an American racing driver.

== Motorsports career results ==
=== Indianapolis 500 results ===
Year	Car	Start	Qual	Rank	Finish	Laps	Led	Retired
1930	34	26	101.178	15	23	48	0	Valve
1931	69	40	102.386	37	16	180	0	Flagged
1932	55	15	110.402	27	10	200	0	Running
Totals						428	0	

Starts	3
Poles	0
Front Row	0
Wins	0
Top 5	0
Top 10	1
Retired	1
