= George R. Bentel =

American automobile dealer and racing promoter (1872–1952)

- Born: George Roy Bentel; July 2, 1872; Pittsburgh, Pennsylvania, U.S.
- Died: February 27, 1952 (aged 79); Los Angeles, California, U.S.
- Occupation: Automobile dealer
- Spouse: Harriet Chaney (m. 1897)
- Children: 1

George Roy Bentel (July 2, 1876 – February 27, 1952) was an American automobile dealer and the first owner of the Legion Ascot Speedway. Bentel was inducted into the National Sprint Car Hall of Fame in 2010 for his contributions to the sport.

== Biography ==
=== Background ===
Bentel was born in Pittsburgh, Pennsylvania; his parents were Frank A. and Mary (Wolf) Bentel. After his high school graduation in 1892, Bentel began working at the Pittsburgh brokerage house of Henry Sproul & Co. He moved to Los Angeles, California in 1900.

=== Automobile dealer ===
In 1907, Bentel entered the automobile industry as the West Coast distributor of the Rainier and American Mercedes. He became the Pacific Coast dealer for Simplex and Mercer in 1910. His Mercer territory was quickly expanded to include the entire United States west of Denver, Colorado (from the Canadian border south to Mexico). Bentel's other company Coleman & Bentel Co. became the Los Angeles Michelin tire distributor in 1912. Two years later, Bentel opened a Mercer salesroom in Seattle, Washington. He became the West Coast distributor of the Jordan Motor Car Company in 1916.

Between August 1913 and July 1917, Bentel's Los Angeles-based salesroom and mechanical department were located at separate sites. They were united in a new four-story building in August 1917. In 1917, Bentel also showcased the Ascot Speedway model, a Mercer race car the body of which former racing driver Glover Ruckstell had equipped with innovative features for its occupants' comfort. The Bentel Co. used the slogan "where motor styles originate." The policy was to allow consumers to use their own color scheme.

=== Racing promoter ===
In late 1915, Bentel became the Chairman of the Contest Committee of the original Ascot Park speedway. Promotion was successful under Bentel. He also had numerous racers drive his Mercer cars on the West Coast during the second half of the 1910s, including Barney Oldfield, Eddie Pullen, and Eddie Rickenbacker. After selling his lease on Ascot to the Goodyear Tire and Rubber Company in 1919, he announced plans to build a new oval at another site soon.

It was only in late 1923, though, that Bentel acquired a long-term lease on property near Lincoln Park where the second Ascot track would be constructed. The new speedway opened in January 1924 before 35,000 spectators. Bentel's promotion of Ascot during the first months of its existence was a popular and financial success. After the 1924 Thanksgiving Day road race, however, drivers complained about being unpaid and Bentel was handed a suspended 30-day jail sentence for false advertising. In January 1925, Ascot was taken over by the creditors' committee of the Ascot Speedway Association, which reopened the track under a new management.

== Lawsuits and scandals ==
Bentel was involved in many lawsuits, both as a broker and as an auto dealer.

There was, for instance, a legal dispute with the Merchants' National Bank of Santa Monica. In 1913, Bentel was sued by A.R. Fraser; Fraser won the lawsuit. Bentel appealed the lawsuit.

Bentel and Oliver Morosco formed a motion picture company, Morosco Productions, and launched a real estate development company, Morosco Holdings, in 1921. The latter planned to develop a 100-acre (40 ha) theme park. The partners were indicted in 1924 and Bentel was convicted of mail fraud for the venture in 1926 for swindling stock while Morosco was acquitted of all charges.

== Personal life ==
Bentel married Harriet Chaney in 1897. The couple had one daughter, Margaret. Bentel died on February 27, 1952, in Los Angeles.
