= Legion Ascot Speedway =

Motorsport track in the United States

- Location: El Sereno, California, U.S.
- Coordinates: 34.067°N 118.191°W
- Capacity: 12500
- Owner: George R. Bentel (1924–1925)
- Operator: Glendale American Legion (1928–1935)
- Opened: January 20, 1924
- Closed: January 26, 1936
- Architect: Paul Derkum (track); Jack Prince (grandstands)
- Former names: American Legion Speedway (1929–1930); Legion Ascot Speedway (1930–1935)
- Major events: AAA Champ Car (1935–1936)

5/8-mile oval
- Surface: Dirt, later asphalt
- Length: 0.625 miles (1 km)

1/2-mile oval
- Surface: Dirt
- Length: 0.50 miles (0.80 km)

Legion Ascot Speedway was an American race track in El Sereno, California that operated from 1924 to 1936. It hosted AAA Champ Car races.

== History ==
=== Early success under Bentel ends with a scandal ===
After the construction of a 5/8-mile dirt oval in El Sereno had been announced in early December 1923, the new Ascot speedway, which was built by promoter George R. Bentel and his publicist Bill Pickens, opened on January 20, 1924, when 35,000 spectators attended the inaugural event, which featured both auto and motorcycle racing.

The next racing program, which was held two weeks later, was marred by the tracks' first fatality when Jimmy Craft was killed on the southeast turn. Many drivers would die at this curve, which was immediately nicknamed "death curve."

The promotion of Ascot during the first months of its existence was a popular and financial success. However, the Ascot Gold Cup, a road race held on Thanksgiving Day 1924, saw its outcome challenged by drivers contesting both the eligibility of other competitors to participate and the official race distance. Drivers also charged that prize money had been withheld. Bentel and other officials of the Ascot Speedway Association were handed suspended 30-day jail sentences for false advertising in April 1925.

In the meantime, Ascot had been taken over by the creditors' committee of the association, the new management being headed by its trustee John S. White, who scheduled the next racing event for late January 1925. The site was run unsuccessfully by various promoters in the years that followed, occasionally serving as a venue for boxing matches.

=== Fame and mounting deaths under the American Legion ===
The American Legion Post 127 of Glendale, which had started promoting the track in the fall of 1928, entered into a long-term lease of the property in early March 1929, having secured AAA sanction for the American Legion Speedway. 15 months later, it was renamed Legion Ascot Speedway based on the legionnaires' assessment that they had rehabilitated "Ascot," giving the track the name it would be widely known by. Major drivers raced at the track such as Bill Cummings, Al Gordon, Ernie Triplett, Kelly Petillo, Wilbur Shaw and Rex Mays. It also attracted celebrity spectators such as Bing Crosby, Andy Devine, Loretta Young, Clark Gable, Charlie Chaplin, Edward G. Robinson, Douglas Fairbanks Jr., Clara Bow and Carole Lombard. Actresses sometimes presented trophies to the winning drivers.

The high speeds the racers reached contributed to heavy and spectacular crashes at the speedway. About two dozen people died in the twelve years that Legion Ascot operated, earning it the nickname "killer track." It had the most deaths of any American race track in that time period. In 1933 alone, six deaths occurred, stirring turmoil in the newspapers as racing continued before large crowds.

=== The Legion leaves, final fatalities and fire ===
In July 1934, a flat half-mile dirt oval was opened. It was built inside the old track, the banked five-eighths-mile oval, which at some point had been paved with asphalt and was reopened in November of the same year after its south curve had been refurbished for safety purposes. With the bulk of its tenure a profitable effort, the Glendale American Legion post had been facing a host of problems since 1934: anti-racing sentiment in the public, upcoming competition from midget car racing luring away popular drivers and waning interest among the fans as a consequence, as well as disagreements with the lessors on rent and other issues. Hence the leasing contract was not renewed and expired at the end of September 1935.

Management of Ascot was then assumed by former race car owner and promoter Bill S. White, who was asked to do so by his peers. The last race was to be held on January 26, 1936, when both Al Gordon and his riding mechanic, Spider Matlock, suffered fatal injuries as a result of a crash. The track was closed, being denied an AAA license. In late April 1936, a quarter of the grandstand of the abandoned speedway was destroyed by fire. Seven years later, Linden Emerson, a former janitor at the track, turned himself in, confessing that he had burned down the grandstand because he did not want to see any more of his friends die there.

Today, Multnomah Elementary School and a tract of houses cover the land that Legion Ascot Speedway had occupied. The dangerous "south curve" remains as a curve in Hatfield Place, being the only trace of the track and its checkered history.

== Series of Ascot race tracks ==
Legion Ascot was the second of four Ascot sites in Los Angeles after the original one-mile South-Central oval was open between 1907 and 1919. Ascot Park was then replaced by a Goodyear tire factory. A third site, which opened as Southern Speedway near South Gate in June 1936, was renamed Southern Ascot in January 1938 and held races on a half-mile dirt oval until 1942. The fourth track in the series was Ascot Park in Gardena, which operated from 1957 through 1990.
