= Ray Pixley =

American racing driver (1907–1936)

- Born: William Raymond Pixley; February 1, 1907 Lynden, Washington, U.S.
- Died: August 30, 1936 (aged 29) Hammond, Indiana, U.S.

Champ Car career
- 1 race run over 1 year
- Best finish: 11th (tie) (1936)
- First race: 1936 Indianapolis 500 (Indianapolis)
| Wins | Podiums | Poles |
|---|---|---|
| 0 | 0 | 0 |

William Raymond Pixley (February 1, 1907 – August 30, 1936) was an American racing driver.

== Biography ==
Pixley was born and raised in Lynden, Washington, and worked at a cabinetmaker after graduating from high school. Primarily a sprint car driver, Pixley competed in the 1936 Indianapolis 500 for Clarence Felker, driving in a Miller that had once sported a V16 engine but at the time was powered by a Miller four-cylinder. It would be his only Championship Car start as he was killed in August of that year in a crash at Roby Speedway in Hammond, Indiana.

== Motorsports career results ==
=== Indianapolis 500 results ===
| Year | Car | Start | Qual | Rank | Finish | Laps | Led | Retired |
|---|---|---|---|---|---|---|---|---|
| 1936 | 41 | 25 | 116.703 | 7 | 6 | 200 | 0 | Running |
| Totals | | | | | | 200 | 0 | |

| Starts | 1 |
| Poles | 0 |
| Front Row | 0 |
| Wins | 0 |
| Top 5 | 0 |
| Top 10 | 1 |
| Retired | 0 |
