= Stubby Stubblefield =

American racing driver (1907–1935)

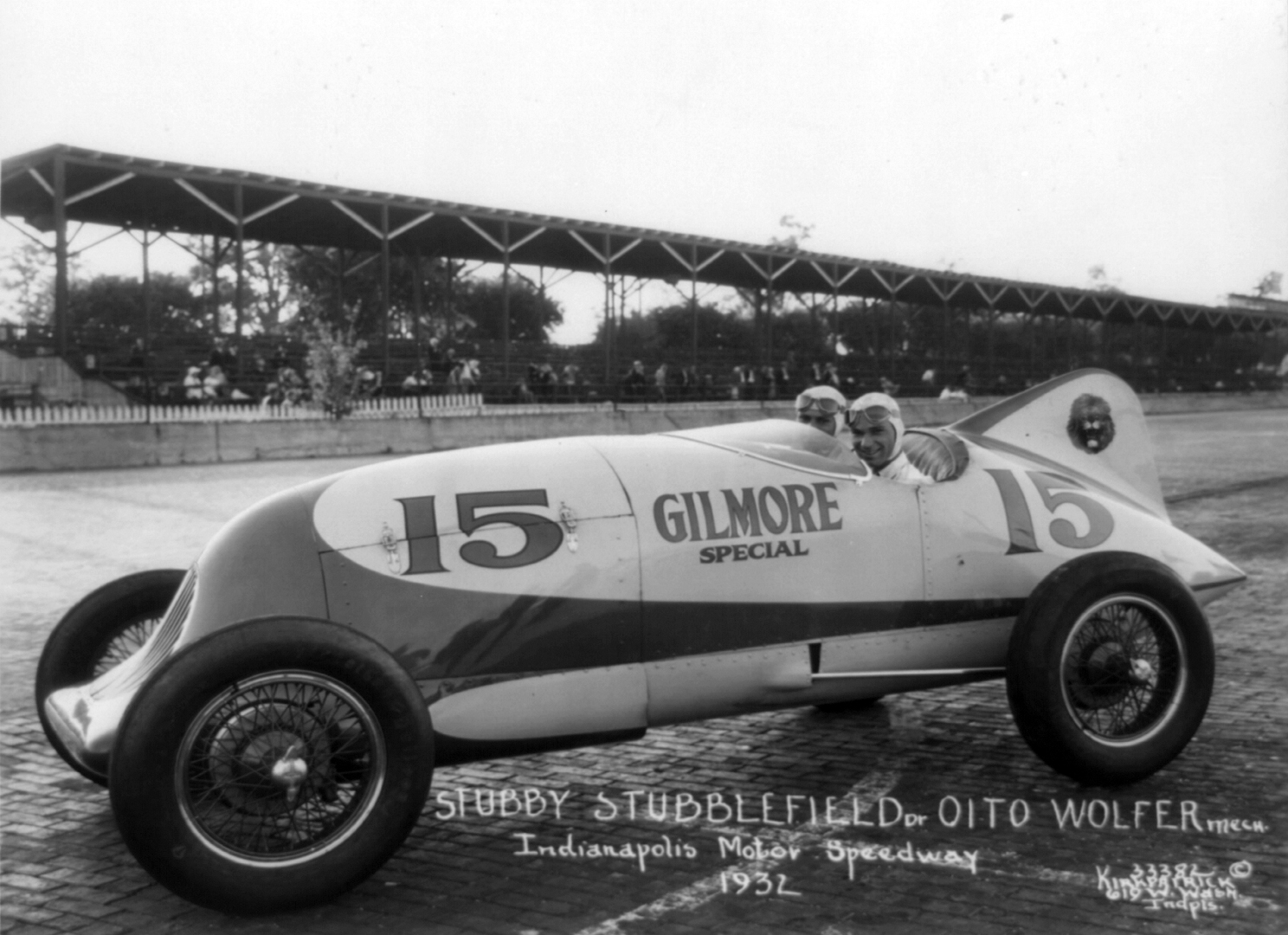
- Stubblefield and mechanic Otto Wolfer at the 1932 Indianapolis 500
- Born: Hartwell Wilburn Stubblefield; December 28, 1907 Oklahoma City, Oklahoma, U.S.
- Died: May 21, 1935 (aged 27) Indianapolis, Indiana, U.S.

Champ Car career
- 11 races run over 6 years
- Best finish: 5th (1933)
- First race: 1930 Detroit 100 (Detroit)
- Last race: 1934 Mines Field Race (Mines Field)
- First win: 1932 Roby 100 (Roby)
Wins	Podiums	Poles
1	2	0

Hartwell Wilburn "Stubby" Stubblefield (possibly born Wilburn Hartwell Stubblefield, c. December 28, 1907 – May 21, 1935) was an American racing driver. He was killed practicing for the 1935 Indianapolis 500.

== Birth detail confusion ==
Some sources give Stubblefield's birthdate as December 28, 1909, but most sources say 1907 with no month or day specified. Furthermore, a newspaper article states that he was 27 years old at the time of his death, which implies a birthdate between May 22, 1907 and May 21, 1908. At the time of his death, his home was in Los Angeles. Some sources say that he was born in Los Angeles, but most say that he was born in Oklahoma. The 1910 United States Census lists him as being the age of two when his family was recorded on April 25, 1910, and living in Oklahoma City.

== Death ==
Stubblefield was the first driver ever killed during a qualification attempt at the Indianapolis Motor Speedway when he and Leo Whitaker (his riding mechanic) struck a wall on a time trial run; both were killed. At the time of the crash, their speed was about 116 miles per hour. He is buried at Angeles Abbey Memorial Park, Compton, California.

== Awards and honors ==
- Stubblefield was inducted in the National Sprint Car Hall of Fame in 1997.

== Motorsports career results ==
=== Indianapolis 500 results ===
Year	Car	Start	Qual	Rank	Finish	Laps	Led	Retired
1931	36	9	108.797	15	8	200	0	Running
1932	15	25	112.899	11	14	178	0	Flagged
1933	8	10	114.784	13	5	200	0	Running
1934	5	29	105.921	32	12	200	0	Running
Totals						778	0	

Starts	4
Poles	0
Front Row	0
Wins	0
Top 5	1
Top 10	2
Retired	0
