= Ray Campbell (racing driver) =

American racing driver (1900–1966)

- Born: Alfred Raymond Campbell; June 16, 1900 Lebanon, Indiana, U.S.
- Died: October 10, 1966 (aged 66) Detroit, Michigan, U.S.

Champ Car career
- 3 races run over 2 years
- Best finish: 19th (tie) (1932)
- First race: 1932 Indianapolis 500 (Indianapolis)
- Last race: 1933 Indianapolis 500 (Indianapolis)
Wins	Podiums	Poles
0	0	0

Alfred Raymond Campbell (June 16, 1900 – October 10, 1966) was an American racing driver.

== Motorsports career results ==
=== Indianapolis 500 results ===
Year	Car	Start	Qual	Rank	Finish	Laps	Led	Retired
1932	72	34	108.969	33	30	60	0	Crankshaft
1933	59	37	108.650	37	39	24	0	Oil leak
Totals						84	0	

Starts	2
Poles	0
Front Row	0
Wins	0
Top 5	0
Top 10	0
Retired	2
