= Johnny Krieger =

American racing driver (1894–1953)

- Born: October 18, 1894 Omaha, Nebraska, U.S.
- Died: June 11, 1953 (aged 58) Los Angeles, California, U.S.

Champ Car career
- 1 race run over 2 years
- First race: 1932 Indianapolis 500 (Indianapolis)
Wins	Podiums	Poles
0	0	0

Johnny Krieger (October 18, 1894 – June 11, 1953) was an American racing driver.

== Motorsports career results ==
=== Indianapolis 500 results ===
Year	Car	Start	Qual	Rank	Finish	Laps	Led	Retired
1932	49	33	109.276	32	35	30	0	Rod
Totals						30	0	

Starts	1
Poles	0
Front Row	0
Wins	0
Top 5	0
Top 10	0
Retired	1
