= Gus Schrader =

American racing driver (1895–1941)

- Born: August Schrader Jr. May 22, 1895 Newhall, Iowa, U.S.
- Died: October 22, 1941 (aged 46) Shreveport, Louisiana, U.S.

Champ Car career
- 1 race run over 1 year
- First race: 1932 Indianapolis 500 (Indianapolis)
Wins	Podiums	Poles
0	0	0

August Schrader Jr. (May 22, 1895 – October 22, 1941) was an American racing driver.

== Background and personal life ==
Schrader was born on a farm near Newhall, Iowa. After he was hurt while racing in California, he met a nurse named Eunice in the hospital; the couple married in 1939.

== Racing career ==
Schrader began racing motorcycles and switched to racing cars after World War I. He originally raced in a Ford Model T then switched to a Nash after he became a Nash dealer. Schrader competed in Indianapolis 500 in 1932. After starting 15th, he raced up to around sixth before his oil pump blew on the sixth lap causing him to lose control and hit the wall. He finished 39th out of 40 cars. Schrader had a background in dirt track racing and the American Automobile Association (AAA); racing primarily on bricks and boards, so he decided to spend $2500 to break his AAA contract mid-1932 to race in International Motor Contest Association (IMCA).

Schrader was the International Motor Contest Association (IMCA) sprint car champion from 1933 to 1937 and 1939 to 1941. He finished second in 1938 to Emory Collins, losing the title at the final race of 1938. Both were driving Curly Wetteroth-built Offenhauser powered cars that cost $15000. He was paid a $1000 annual sponsorship from Montgomery Ward according to his wife.

== Death ==
Schrader decided to retire from racing to work on his family's newly-repurchased family farm. He competed in his final race on October 22, 1941, at the Louisiana State Fairgrounds in Shreveport. Witnesses said that he was racing beside Jimmy Wilburn when his car drifted high in the corner and Wilburn's didn't, which caused their tires to touch. Schrader's car reportedly rolled end-over-end 15 times. He died a couple of hours later from skull fracture, concussion and cerebral hemorrhage while Wilburn was unhurt. He already had his final title locked up.

== Awards and honors ==
Schrader was inducted in the National Sprint Car Hall of Fame in its inaugural 1990 class. He was also inducted in the IMCA Hall of Fame in 1971, the Des Moines Register Hall of Fame. and the Iowa Racing Hall of Fame in 2018.

== Motorsports career results ==
=== Indianapolis 500 results ===
Year	Car	Start	Qual	Rank	Finish	Laps	Led	Retired
1932	45	28	112.003	13	39	7	0	Crash T4
Totals						7	0	

Starts	1
Poles	0
Front Row	0
Wins	0
Top 5	0
Top 10	0
Retired	1
