= Willard Prentiss =

American racing driver (1897–1959)

- Born: Willard Cable Prentiss; December 10, 1897 Chicago, Illinois, U.S.
- Died: October 1, 1959 (aged 61) Denver, Colorado, U.S.

Champ Car career
- 1 race run over 2 years
- First race: 1933 Indianapolis 500 (Indianapolis)
Wins	Podiums	Poles
0	0	0

Willard Cable Prentiss (December 10, 1897 – October 1, 1959) was an American racing driver. As well as competing in the 1933 Indianapolis 500, he competed in various races across the United States during the 1920s.

== Racing career ==
In 1927, Prentiss competed in the Annual Fall Auto Races at Oakley, Kansas. A win in the ten mile (16 km) race was followed up by second place in the 25-mile (40 km) race, despite having a flat tire for the last three laps. He competed there again in 1928, taking joint second place in the one mile (1.6 km) time trial and third place in the 15-mile (24 km) race.

In 1930, Prentiss was leading a race at the Arizona State Fair, Phoenix, Arizona when his car went through a fence and he sustained serious injuries.

1933 saw Prentiss racing in the Indianapolis 500, driving a Rigling-Duesenberg car owned by Jack Carr. He finished on the lead lap in 13th place, and won $450 in prize money. In 1934, he entered the Indianapolis 500 again. He practiced with two cars, but was not fast enough in qualification to be able to start the race.

== Motorsports career results ==
=== Indianapolis 500 results ===
Year	Car	Start	Qual	Rank	Finish	Laps	Led	Retired
1933	49	40	107.776	41	13	200	0	Running
1934	59	DNQ						
1934	64	DNQ						
Totals						200	0	

Starts	1
Poles	0
Front Row	0
Wins	0
Top 5	0
Top 10	0
Retired	0
