= Ira Hall =

American racing driver (1892–1987)

- Born: Ira Edgar Hall; February 2, 1892 Martinsville, Indiana, U.S.
- Died: February 6, 1987 (aged 95) Tarpon Springs, Florida, U.S.

Champ Car career
- 7 races run over 9 years
- Best finish: 10th (1932)
- First race: 1928 Indianapolis 500 (Indianapolis)
- Last race: 1939 Indianapolis 500 (Indianapolis)
Wins	Podiums	Poles
0	0	0

Ira Edgar Hall (February 2, 1892 – February 6, 1987) was an American racing driver.

== Life ==
Though Hall had several starts in the Indianapolis 500, his greatest fame was gained on the dirt tracks of the Midwest, primarily Indiana and Illinois. He reportedly winning as many as 100 races in a season on what was known as "the suicide circuit." He was seriously injured in the fall of 1927 at George Rogers Clark Speedway near Vincennes, Ind., Speedway, but recovered to return to racing the next year.

Hall was later elected sheriff of Vigo County, Indiana.

Hall was inducted in the National Sprint Car Hall of Fame in 1993.

== Motorsports career results ==
=== Indianapolis 500 results ===
Year	Car	Start	Qual	Rank	Finish	Laps	Led	Retired
1928	26	27	96.886	27	21	115	0	Crash T1
1932	35	5	114.206	7	7	200	6	Running
1933	10	8	115.739	10	37	37	0	Piston
1938	37	27	118.255	26	30	44	0	Crash T3
1939	37	18	121.188	27	24	89	0	Head gasket
Totals						485	6	

Starts	5
Poles	0
Front Row	0
Wins	0
Top 5	0
Top 10	1
Retired	4
