= Howdy Wilcox II =

American racing driver (1905–1946)

- Wilcox in 1933
- Born: Howard Omer Wilcox; February 20, 1905 Indianapolis, Indiana, U.S.
- Died: October 13, 1946 (aged 41) Converse, Indiana, U.S.

Champ Car career
- 6 races run over 2 years
- Best finish: 3rd (1932)
- First race: 1932 Indianapolis 500 (Indianapolis)
- Last race: 1932 Oakland 150 (Oakland)
Wins	Podiums	Poles
0	2	0

Howard Omer "Howdy" Wilcox (February 20, 1905 – October 13, 1946) was an American racing driver active during the 1930s. He commonly raced as Howdy Wilcox II to differentiate himself from fellow Championship Car driver – and 1919 Indianapolis 500 winner – Howdy Wilcox, to whom he was unrelated.

== Biography ==
Wilcox was born on February 20, 1905, in Indianapolis, Indiana.

After finishing second at the 1932 Indianapolis 500 in his rookie year, Wilcox was disqualified after qualifying for the 1933 Indianapolis 500, because race officials learned of medical problems Wilcox was having due to diabetes. Other drivers in the race attempted to get Wilcox reinstated, but his car ended up being driven by future three-time winner Mauri Rose. Following the race, Wilcox sued the speedway for slander, claiming reports had labeled him epileptic rather than diabetic. The $50,000 suit was settled for $3000.

Wilcox died on October 13, 1946, in Converse, Indiana. He had stepped onto the track to wave the checkered flag for Jimmy Wilburn and was hit by the car of Kenneth Wines who was following close behind.

== Motorsports career results ==
=== Indianapolis 500 results ===
Year	Car	Start	Qual	Rank	Finish	Laps	Led	Retired
1932	6	6	113.468	9	2	200	1	Running
Totals						200	1	

Starts	1
Poles	0
Front Row	0
Wins	0
Top 5	1
Top 10	1
Retired	0
