= Al Miller (racing driver, born 1907) =

American racing driver (1907–1967)

- Born: James Allen Miller; April 28, 1907 Pontiac, Michigan, U.S.
- Died: August 18, 1967 (aged 60) Standish, Michigan, U.S.

Champ Car career
- 24 races run over 14 years
- Best finish: 6th (1934)
- First race: 1932 Indianapolis 500 (Indianapolis)
- Last race: 1947 Indianapolis 500 (Indianapolis)
Wins	Podiums	Poles
0	4	0

James Allen Miller (April 28, 1907 – August 18, 1967) was an American racing driver active in the 1930s and 1940s.

He is not related to fellow driver Al Miller, who raced at Indianapolis in the mid-1960s.

Miller is one of three drivers to have participated in the Indianapolis 500 with a prosthetic leg, along with Bill Schindler and Cal Niday.

== Motorsports career results ==
=== Indianapolis 500 results ===
Year	Car	Start	Qual	Rank	Finish	Laps	Led	Retired
1932	29	18	110.129	30	27	66	0	Engine
1933	19	24	109.799	35	21	161	0	Rod
1934	36	8	113.307	17	6	200	0	Running
1935	4	21	115.303	12	15	178	0	Magneto
1936	12	17	116.138	11	21	119	0	Crash FS
1937	42	26	118.518	20	17	170	0	Carburetor
1938	55	22	119.420	22	18	125	0	Clutch
1939	42	28	123.233	18	28	41	0	Accelerator
1940	58	30	120.288	31	30	41	0	Clutch
1941	12	14	123.478	14	28	22	0	Transmission
1947	66	19	124.848	6	25	33	0	Magneto
Totals						1156	0	

Starts	11
Poles	0
Front Row	0
Wins	0
Top 5	0
Top 10	1
Retired	10
