= Al Gordon (racing driver) =

American racing driver (1902–1936)

- Born: Edgar Alan Gordon; March 27, 1902 San Francisco, California, U.S.
- Died: January 26, 1936 (aged 33) Los Angeles, California, U.S.

Championship titles
- AAA West Coast Big Car (1933)

Champ Car career
- 9 races run over 3 years
- Best finish: 11th (1932)
- First race: 1932 Indianapolis 500 (Indianapolis)
- Last race: 1935 Indianapolis 500 (Indianapolis)
Wins	Podiums	Poles
0	1	0

Edgar Alan Gordon (March 27, 1902 – January 26, 1936) was an American racing driver.

== Life and racing career ==
A postman from Redlands, California who also became a Long Beach night club owner among other things, Gordon took up racing in 1925.

Gordon made nine starts in the AAA-sanctioned national championship from 1932 to 1935 and entered two non-points paying races after that, scoring a win at Oakland Speedway in January 1936. He drove in the Indianapolis 500 in 1932, 1934, and 1935, but never finished the race, having qualified second in 1935. A regular at Legion Ascot Speedway, Gordon won the AAA Pacific Coast championship in 1933.

== Death ==
While competing in another AAA non-championship race in January 1936, both Gordon and his riding mechanic, Spider Matlock, were fatally injured in a crash at Ascot, which ended racing at the Los Angeles track.

== Awards and honors ==
Gordon was inducted into the National Sprint Car Hall of Fame in 1999.

== Motorsports career results ==
=== Indianapolis 500 results ===
Year	Car	Start	Qual	Rank	Finish	Laps	Led	Retired
1932	26	37	111.290	17	40	3	0	Crash T4
1934	51	17	116.273	5	22	66	0	Crash T1
1935	6	2	119.481	2	30	17	0	Crash T4
Totals						86	0	

Starts	3
Poles	0
Front Row	1
Wins	0
Top 5	0
Top 10	0
Retired	3
