= Paul Bost =

American racing driver (1904–1987)

- Born: Paul Brown Bost; December 7, 1904 Matthews, North Carolina, U.S.
- Died: December 21, 1987 (aged 83) Charlotte, North Carolina, U.S.

Champ Car career
- 11 races run over 5 years
- Best finish: 16th (1931)
- First race: 1929 Detroit 100 (Detroit)
- Last race: 1933 Indianapolis 500 (Indianapolis)
Wins	Podiums	Poles
0	1	1

Paul Brown Bost (December 7, 1904 – December 21, 1987) was an American racing driver. He raced in events from 1929 and appeared on both dirt or board oval tracks. He continued racing until 1935, when he was a relief driver for Mauri Rose at the Indianapolis 500. In 1935, he married and fulfilled a pledge to his new wife to cease racing promptly upon marriage.

== Motorsports career results ==
=== Indianapolis 500 results ===
Year	Car	Start	Qual	Rank	Finish	Laps	Led	Retired
1931	31	3	112.125	5	31	35	2	Crankshaft
1932	17	8	111.885	14	37	18	0	Crankshaft
1933	24	33	111.330	24	40	13	0	Oil line
Totals						66	2	

Starts	3
Poles	0
Front Row	1
Wins	0
Top 5	0
Top 10	0
Retired	3
