= Fred Frame =

American racing driver (1894–1962)

- Born: Frederick William Colbath; June 3, 1894 Exeter, New Hampshire, U.S.
- Died: April 24, 1962 (aged 67) Hayward, California, U.S.

Championship titles
- Major victories Indianapolis 500 (1932)

Champ Car career
- 25 races run over 11 years
- Best finish: 2nd (1931, 1932)
- First race: 1927 Indianapolis 500 (Indianapolis)
- Last race: 1936 Indianapolis 500 (Indianapolis)
- First win: 1932 Indianapolis 500 (Indianapolis)
Wins	Podiums	Poles
1	5	0

Frederick William Frame (born Frederick William Colbath, June 3, 1894 – April 24, 1962) was an American racing driver. One of the leading AAA Championship Car drivers of the late 1920s and early 1930s, Frame is best remembered for his victory at the 1932 Indianapolis 500.

== Biography ==
=== Early life ===
Freme was born Frederick William Colbath on June 3, 1894, in Exeter, New Hampshire. His parents were Frank Colbath and Isabella Colbath (McClish). At a young age Colbath's father departed the family, and by 1910 Isabella had remarried to C. James Frame, and had relocated with her husband and son to Pasadena, California. By this point Fred, as he was commonly known, had taken his stepfather's surname.

=== Early career ===
Frame began dirt track racing in about 1922. On July 5, 1923, Frame set his first world record in San Luis Obispo, California, driving a mile on a dirt track in 43.4 seconds. Frame's record mile, established in a non-competitive event, surpassed the previous record for a dirt track mile of 45 seconds, held by Barney Oldfield of St. Louis since August 1917.

By 1924, Frame was running his own car on the dirt track at Culver City, California, finishing second in a 100-mile race held there on July 5. Frame also continued to race on dirt tracks and began to venture outside of California in 1926, escaping serious injury in a crash in September of that year in a five-mile race in Abilene, Texas, held in conjunction with the West Texas Fair. A Texas racer was less fortunate, being killed in the same race when his car went through a railing and rolled.

=== Championship Car career ===
Frame began running at the Indianapolis 500, held in Indianapolis, Indiana, in 1927. In that year he drove a machine owned by George Fernic, finishing in 11th place. He was brought back in 1928 by car owner Bill White to drive the same Duesenberg which had won the race the previous year. Frame would finish in 8th place in that race.

In 1929, Frame arrived in Indianapolis just four days ahead of the race to drive a Cooper Special Front Drive. Despite limited practice time, Frame was able to qualify the car at over 111 miles per hour and sat in second place at the halfway point of the race, which was started by 33 cars on a quest for a share of $100,000 in prize money. He would finish in tenth place, after leading the race for 11 laps — receiving bonus prize money of $100 per lap led provided by race sponsors.

Frame would race at Indianapolis eight times in all, including a second-place finish in the 1931 race.

==== 1932 Indianapolis 500 victory ====
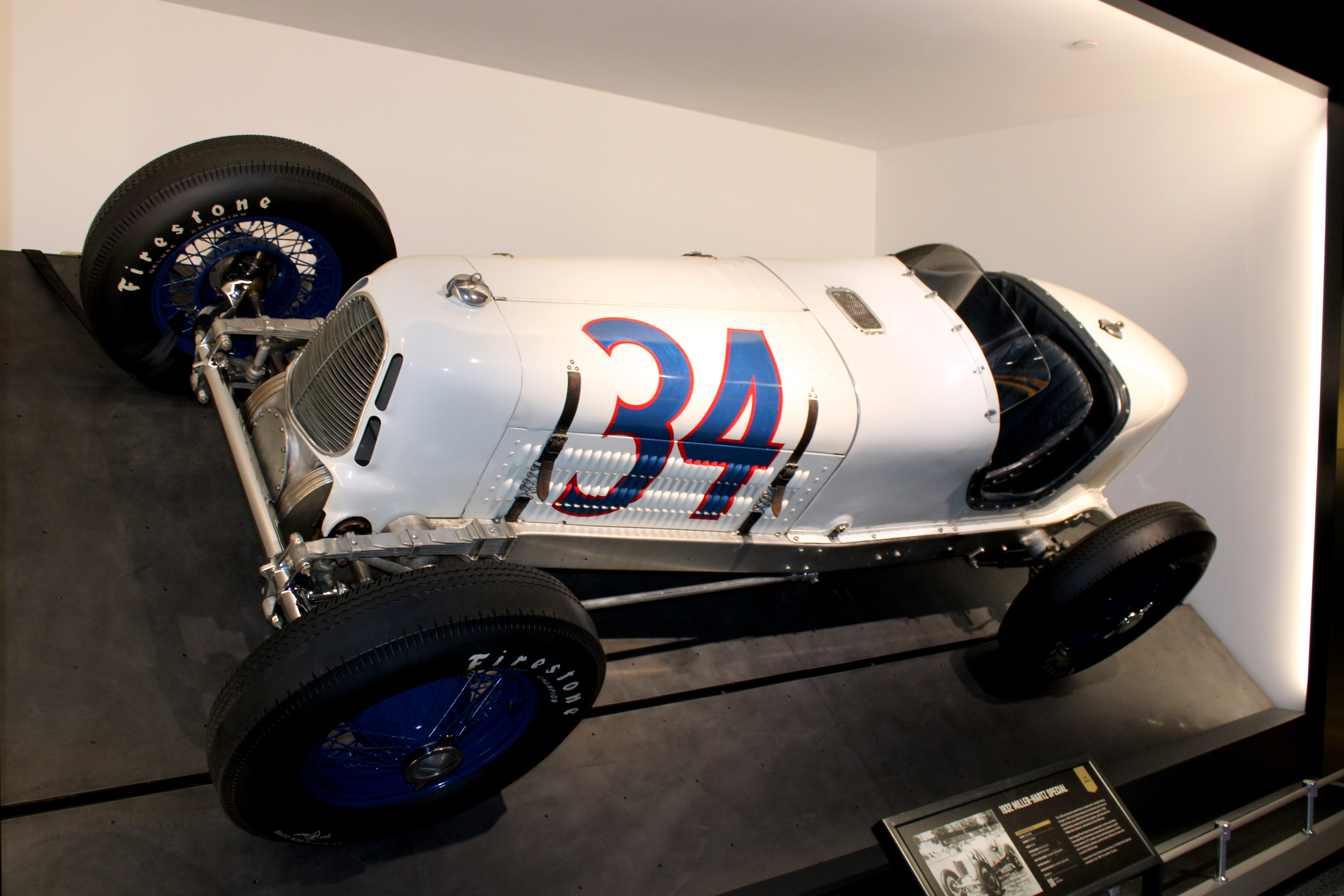
Frame's winning car from the 1932 Indianapolis 500

Frame's greatest career victory was a win in the 1932 Indianapolis 500 on May 31, 1932. Driving a tan Miller-Hartz front wheel drive machine, the 10-year racing veteran Frame finished the course in 4 hours, 48 minutes, 3.79 seconds. Frame dueled fellow competitor Howard Wilcox of Indianapolis over the last 75 miles in front of a packed crowd of 155,000 spectators to win the victory in a race in which only 10 of 40 starting cars managed to finish. Frame took the lead in lap 157 and never relinquished the advantage.

Frame's winning average speed of 104.14 mph topped the previous course record of 101.13 mph, set by Peter DePaolo in his 1925 Memorial Day victory at the Indianapolis Motor Speedway. Frame became the third Indianapolis 500 winner to win with an average speed of more than 100 mph.

=== Personal life and death ===
Frame's son Bob was killed at a sprint car race in Minnesota in 1947. Frame died of an apparent heart attack in April 1962 in Hayward, California, a city in Northern California's East Bay area that he moved to in 1950.

== Awards and honors ==
Frame has been inducted into the following halls of fame:

- Auto Racing Hall of Fame (1984)
- New England Auto Racers Hall of Fame (2004)

== Motorsports career results ==
=== Indianapolis 500 results ===
Year	Car	Start	Qual	Rank	Finish	Laps	Led	Retired
1927	31	33	106.859	27	11	199	0	Flagged
1928	27	14	107.501	20	8	200	0	Running
1929	34	22	111.328	19	10	193	11	Flagged
1931	34	8	109.273	14	2	200	0	Running
1932	34	27	113.856	8	1	200	58	Running
1933	12	3	117.864	3	29	85	37	Valve
1935	19	8	114.701	16	11	200	0	Running
1936	46	31	112.877	25	32	4	0	Piston
Totals						1281	106	

Starts	8
Poles	0
Front Row	1
Wins	1
Top 5	2
Top 10	4
Retired	2

Preceded by Louis Schneider	Indianapolis 500 Winner; 1932	Succeeded by Louis Meyer
