= Dusty Fahrnow =

American racing driver (1903–1981)

- Born: Herbert Dale Fahrnow; January 18, 1903 Huntington, Indiana, U.S.
- Died: May 25, 1981 (aged 78) Contra Costa, California, U.S.

Champ Car career
- 1 race run over 5 years
- Best finish: 27th (1932)
- First race: 1934 Indianapolis 500 (Indianapolis)
Wins	Podiums	Poles
0	0	0

Herbert Dale "Dusty" Fahrnow (January 18, 1903 – May 25, 1981) was an American racing driver.

== Motorsports career results ==
=== Indianapolis 500 results ===
Year	Car	Start	Qual	Rank	Finish	Laps	Led	Retired
1934	42	25	113.070	19	24	28	0	Rod
Totals						28	0	

Starts	1
Poles	0
Front row	0
Wins	0
Top 5	0
Top 10	0
Retired	1
