= Luther Johnson (racing driver) =

American racing driver (1903–1978)

- Born: Luther Alexander Johnson; July 19, 1903 South Bend, Indiana, U.S.
- Died: April 12, 1978 (aged 74) South Bend, Indiana, U.S.

Champ Car career
- 4 races run over 5 years
- Best finish: 18th (1933)
- First race: 1930 Detroit 100 (Detroit)
- Last race: 1933 Indianapolis 500 (Indianapolis)
Wins	Podiums	Poles
0	0	0

Luther Alexander Johnson (July 19, 1903 – April 12, 1978) was an American racing driver who drove in Champ Car races.

== Motorsports career results ==
=== Indianapolis 500 results ===
Year	Car	Start	Qual	Rank	Finish	Laps	Led	Retired
1931	57	12	107.652	20	20	156	0	Crash T4
1932	46	11	111.218	18	16	164	0	Lost wheel FS
1933	46	20	110.097	31	10	200	0	Running
Totals						520	0	

Starts	3
Poles	0
Front Row	0
Wins	0
Top 5	0
Top 10	1
Retired	2
