= Juan Gaudino =

Argentine racing driver (1893–1975)

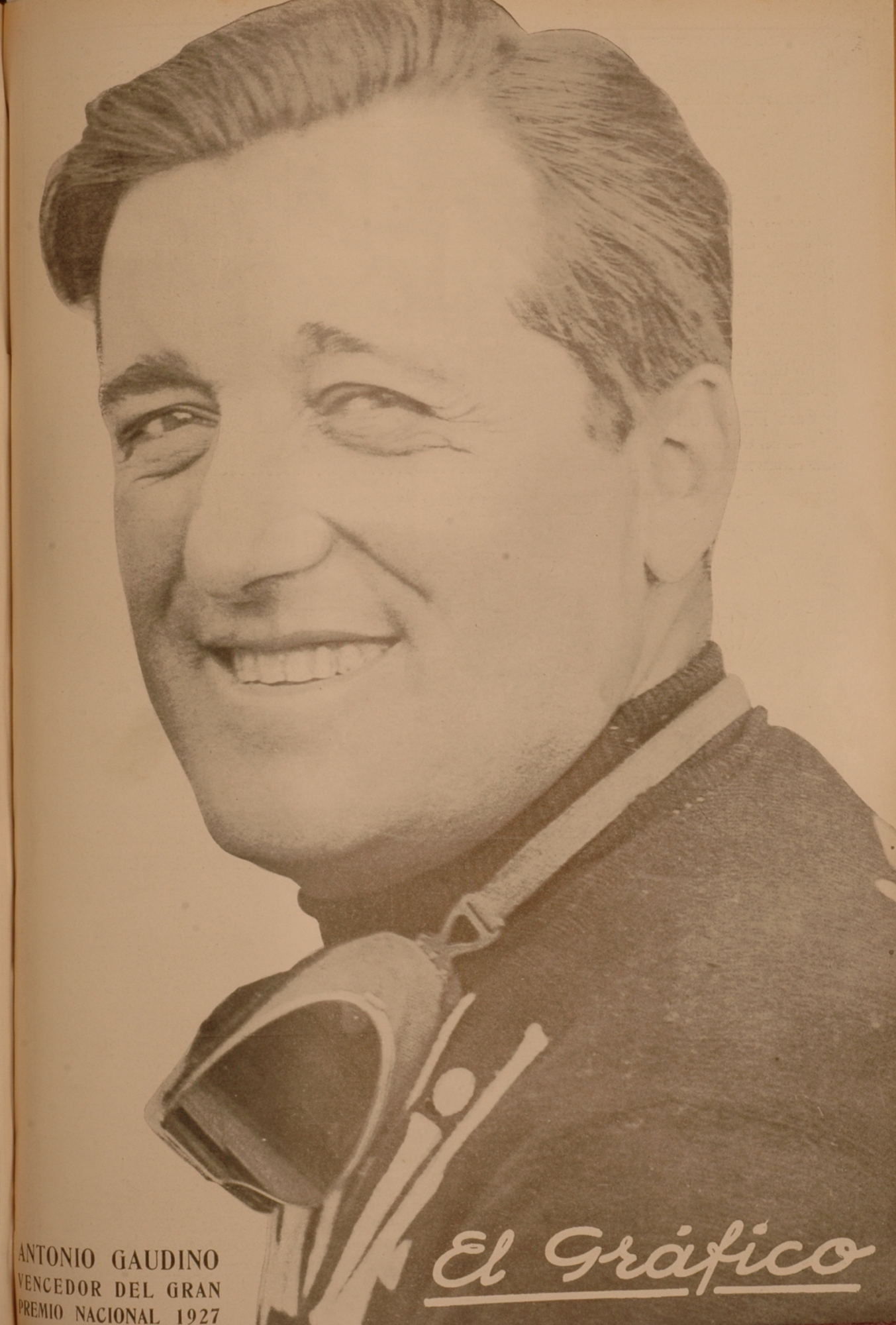
- Gaudino on the cover of El Gráfico magazine, 1927
- Born: Juan Antonio Gaudino circa 1893 Turin, Piedmont, Italy
- Died: 25 March 1975 (aged 81–82) Buenos Aires, Argentina

Champ Car career
- 1 race run over 2 years
- First race: 1932 Indianapolis 500 (Indianapolis)
Wins	Podiums	Poles
0	0	0

Juan Antonio Gaudino (c. 1893 – 25 March 1975) was an Argentine racing driver.

== Motorsports career results ==
=== Indianapolis 500 results ===
Year	Car	Start	Qual	Rank	Finish	Laps	Led	Retired
1932	14	36	107.466	39	26	71	0	Clutch
Totals						71	0	

Starts	1
Poles	0
Front Row	0
Wins	0
Top 5	0
Top 10	0
Retired	1
