= Ernie Triplett =

American racing driver (1906–1934)

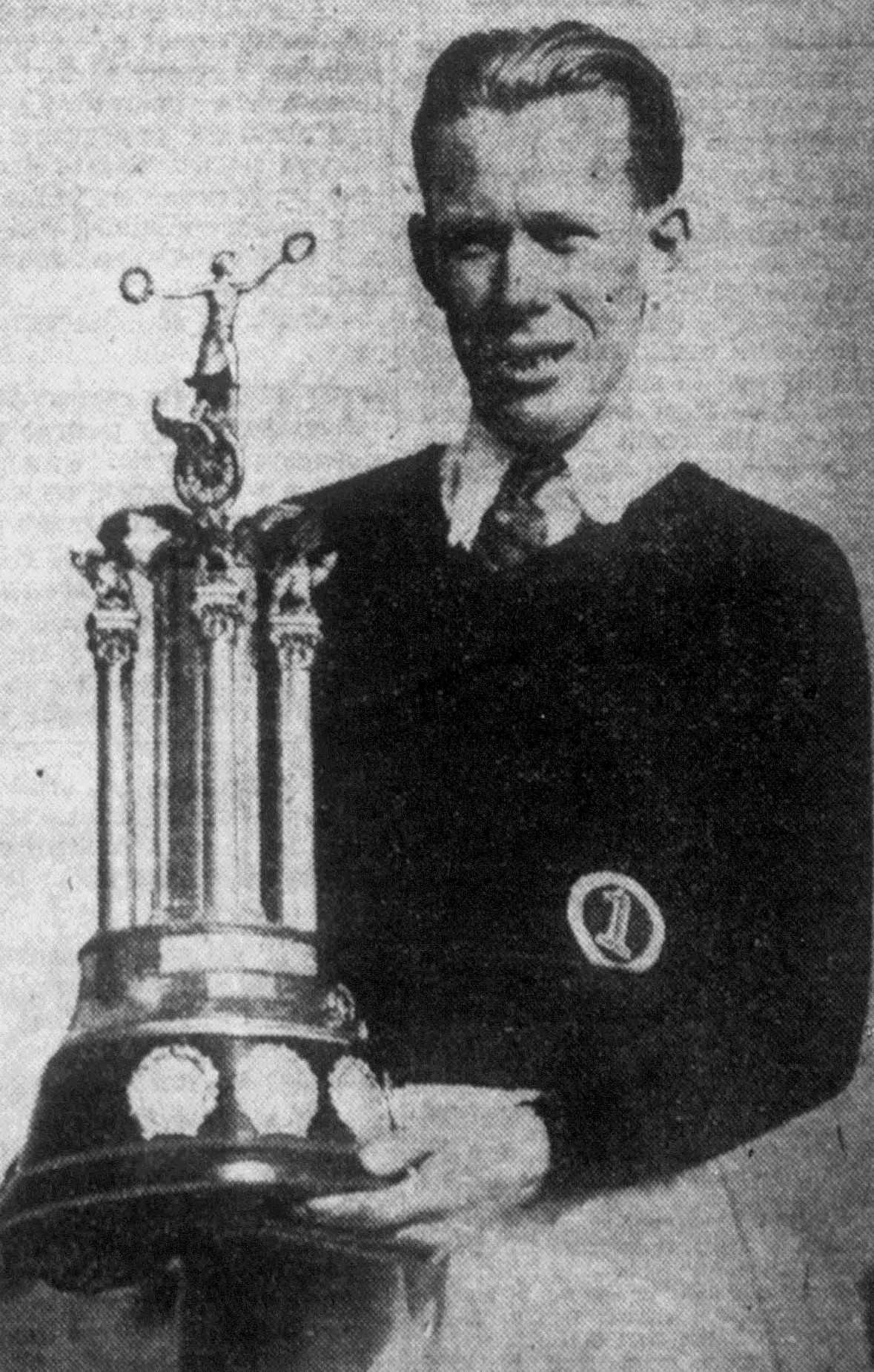
- Triplett, circa 1933
- Born: Ernest Leo Triplett; September 25, 1906 Barry, Illinois, U.S.
- Died: March 5, 1934 (aged 27) El Centro, California, U.S.

Championship titles
- AAA West Coast Big Car (1931, 1932)

Champ Car career
- 11 races run over 5 years
- Best finish: 7th (1931)
- First race: 1929 Indianapolis 500 (Indianapolis)
- Last race: 1933 Indianapolis 500 (Indianapolis)
Wins	Podiums	Poles
0	2	1

Ernest Leo Triplett (September 25, 1906 – March 5, 1934) was an American racing driver. He was the American Automobile Association Pacific Southwest champion in 1931 and 1932. Triplett died from injuries sustained in a crash during a AAA Pacific Southwest "big car" race at Imperial, California.

== Awards and honors ==
- Triplett was named to the National Sprint Car Hall of Fame in 1991.

== Motorsports career results ==
=== Indianapolis 500 results ===
Year	Car	Start	Qual	Rank	Finish	Laps	Led	Retired
1929	47	20	114.789	7	26	48	0	Rod
1930	17	6	105.618	9	17	125	0	Piston
1931	25	5	111.034	10	7	200	0	Running
1932	7	31	114.935	3	22	125	14	Clutch
1933	16	5	117.685	5	33	61	0	Piston
Totals						559	14	

Starts	5
Poles	0
Front Row	0
Wins	0
Top 5	0
Top 10	1
Retired	4
