= Frank Brisko =

American racing driver (1900–1990)

- Born: Stanislaw Franciszek Brzuszczynski; August 24, 1900 Sędzin, Warsaw Governorate, Congress Poland, Russian Empire
- Died: November 26, 1990 (aged 90) Exeland, Wisconsin, U.S.

Champ Car career
- 30 races run over 15 years
- Best finish: 7th (1934)
- First race: 1929 Indianapolis 500 (Indianapolis)
- Last race: 1941 Indianapolis 500 (Indianapolis)
Wins	Podiums	Poles
0	3	0

Frank Stanley Brisko (born Stanislaw Franciszek Brzuszczynski, August 24, 1900 – November 26, 1990) was an American racing driver.

== Biography ==
Brisko was born in Poland, immigrating to the U.S. with his family at a very young age. He grew up in Chicago, and later moved to Milwaukee. Originally a motorcycle racer, Brisko ran in the Indianapolis 500 twelve times. He started on the front row twice, and he led 69 laps of the 1934 race but finished ninth that year. He also was a noted engine designer.

== Motorsports career results ==
=== Indianapolis 500 results ===
Year	Car	Start	Qual	Rank	Finish	Laps	Led	Retired
1929	28	29	105.857	28	11	180	0	Flagged
1931	16	27	106.286	24	22	138	0	Steering arm
1932	32	13	111.149	21	29	61	0	Clutch
1933	58	2	118.388	2	36	47	0	Oil too hot
1934	32	3	116.894	4	9	200	69	Running
1935	41	24	113.307	26	23	79	0	Universal joint
1936	14	20	114.213	17	20	180	0	Out of gas
1937	24	15	118.213	23	23	105	0	No oil pressure
1938	26	11	121.921	8	31	39	0	Oil line
1939	29	11	123.351	17	29	38	0	Air pump
1940	16	8	122.716	16	9	193	0	Flagged
1941	8	22	123.381	16	23	70	0	Valve
Totals						1330	69	

Starts	12
Poles	0
Front Row	2
Wins	0
Top 5	0
Top 10	2
Retired	9
