= Al Aspen =

American racing driver (1893–1959)

- Born: Alfred William Aspen; June 5, 1893 Germantown, Pennsylvania, U.S.
- Died: November 6, 1959 (aged 66) Philadelphia, Pennsylvania, U.S.

Champ Car career
- 8 races run over 5 years
- Best finish: 19th (1931)
- First race: 1931 Indianapolis 500 (Indianapolis)
- Last race: 1932 Syracuse 100 (Syracuse)
Wins	Podiums	Poles
0	0	0

Alfred William Aspen (June 5, 1893 – November 6, 1959) was an American racing driver.

== Motorsports career results ==
=== Indianapolis 500 results ===
Year	Car	Start	Qual	Rank	Finish	Laps	Led	Retired
1931	72	31	102.509	36	14	200	0	Running
1932	21	23	108.008	38	34	31	0	Rod
Totals						231	0	

Starts	2
Poles	0
Front Row	0
Wins	0
Top 5	0
Top 10	0
Retired	1
