= Gene Haustein =

American racing driver (1907–1984)

- Born: Eugene William Haustein; April 10, 1907 Detroit, Michigan, U.S.
- Died: June 6, 1984 (aged 77) Sacramento, California, U.S.

Champ Car career
- 16 races run over 6 years
- Best finish: 14th (1935)
- First race: 1930 Bridgeville 100 (Bridgeville)
- Last race: 1935 Langhorne 100 (Langhorne)
Wins	Podiums	Poles
0	0	0

Eugene William Haustein (April 10, 1907 – June 6, 1984) was an American racing driver.

== Racing career ==
Haustein drove in 16 AAA Championship Car races between 1930 and 1935, including three Indianapolis 500 starts (1931, 1933, and 1934). In addition he failed to qualify for the Indianapolis 500 in 1932 and drove as a relief driver for Ralph Hepburn in 1935.

== Motorsports career results ==
=== Indianapolis 500 results ===
Year	Car	Start	Qual	Rank	Finish	Laps	Led	Retired
1931	26	34	108.395	16	23	117	0	Lost wheel
1933	29	28	107.603	42	15	197	0	Flagged
1934	29	31	109.426	28	30	13	0	Crash T4
Totals						327	0	

Starts	3
Poles	0
Front Row	0
Wins	0
Top 5	0
Top 10	0
Retired	2
