= George Howie =

American racing driver (1901–1979)

- Born: George Najeeb Howie; April 26, 1901 Shweir, Mount Lebanon, Ottoman Empire (current day Dhour El Choueir, Mount Lebanon, Lebanon)
- Died: November 11, 1979 (aged 78) San Luis Obispo, California, U.S.

Champ Car career
- 1 race run over 2 years
- Best finish: 24th (1933)
- First race: 1931 Indianapolis 500 (Indianapolis)
Wins	Podiums	Poles
0	0	0

George Najeeb Howie (April 26, 1901 – November 11, 1979) was an American racing driver.

== Life ==
Born in Dhour El Choueir, Lebanon, Howie emigrated to the United States with his family in 1909. He worked as a mechanic, serving Ray Keech in 1929. He gained US citizenship in 1941.

== Motorsports career results ==
=== Indianapolis 500 results ===
Year	Car	Start	Qual	Rank	Finish	Laps	Led	Retired
1931	44	30	102.844	35	11	200	0	Running
Totals						200	0	

Starts	1
Poles	0
Front Row	0
Wins	0
Top 5	0
Top 10	0
Retired	0
