= Malcolm Fox (racing driver) =

American racing driver (1906–1968)

- Born: Malcolm Harrison Fox; March 13, 1906 Westville, New Jersey, U.S.
- Died: August 21, 1968 (aged 62) San Francisco, California, U.S.

Champ Car career
- 4 races run over 3 years
- First race: 1931 Altoona 100 (Altoona)
- Last race: 1933 Indianapolis 500 (Indianapolis)
Wins	Podiums	Poles
0	0	0

Malcolm Harrison Fox (March 13, 1906 – August 21, 1968) was an American racing driver.

== Motorsports career results ==
=== Indianapolis 500 results ===
Year	Car	Start	Qual	Rank	Finish	Laps	Led	Retired
1932	57	32	111.149	20	20	132	0	Spring
1933	57	30	112.922	19	28	121	0	Crash T1
Totals						253	0	

Starts	2
Poles	0
Front Row	0
Wins	0
Top 5	0
Top 10	0
Retired	2
