= Chet Miller =

American racing driver (1902–1953)

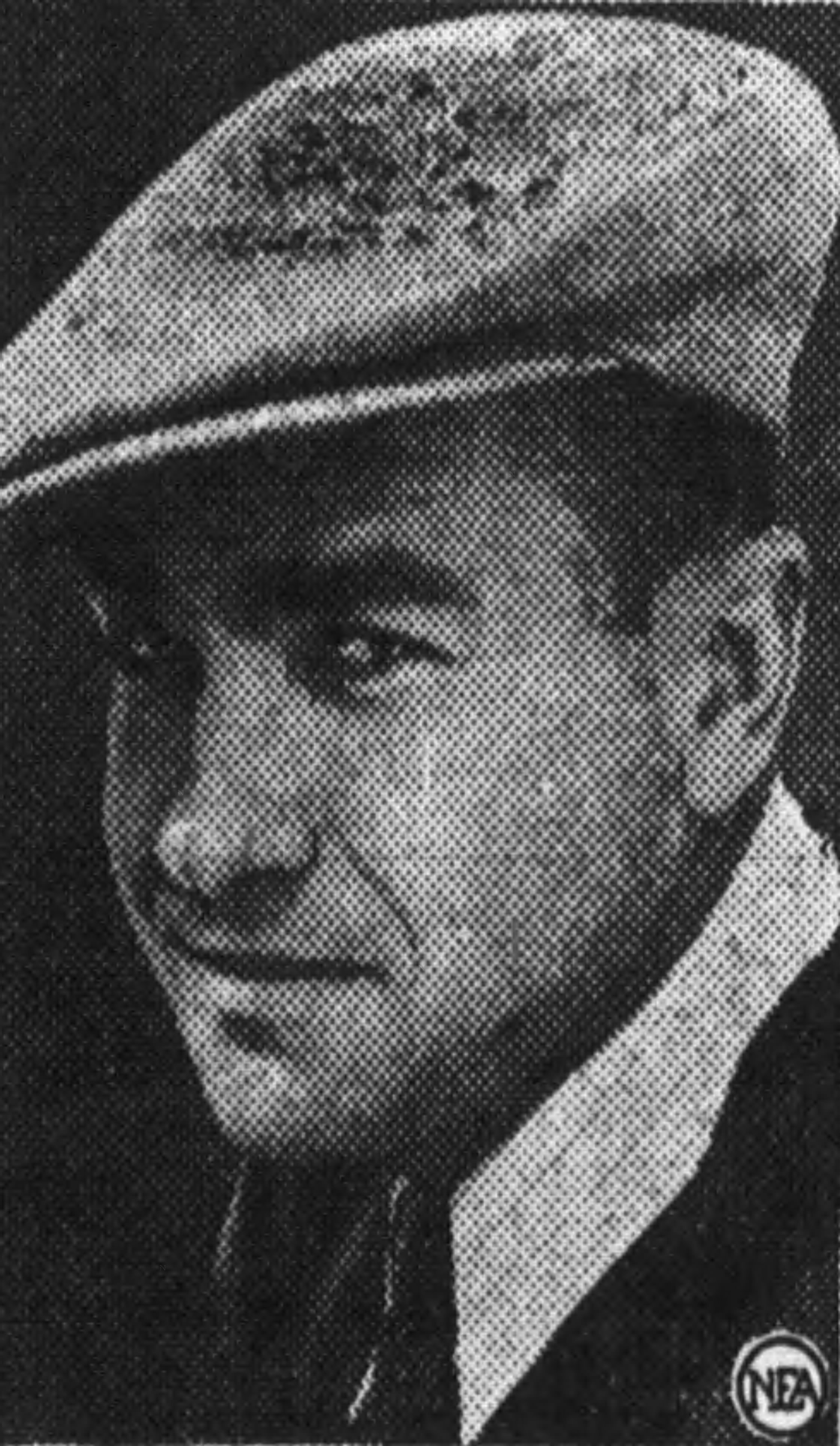
- Miller c. 1934
- Born: Chester Joseph Miller; July 19, 1902 Detroit, Michigan, U.S.
- Died: May 15, 1953 (aged 50) Speedway, Indiana, U.S.

Champ Car career
- 29 races run over 20 years
- Best finish: 3rd (1938)
- First race: 1930 Indianapolis 500 (Indianapolis)
- Last race: 1952 Indianapolis 500 (Indianapolis)
| Wins | Podiums | Poles |
|---|---|---|
| 0 | 2 | 0 |

Formula One World Championship career
- Active years: 1950–1953
- Team: Kurtis Kraft
- Entries: 4 (2 starts)
- Championships: 0
- Wins: 0
- Podiums: 0
- Career points: 0
- Pole positions: 0
- Fastest laps: 0
- First entry: 1950 Indianapolis 500
- Last entry: 1953 Indianapolis 500

Chester Joseph Miller (July 19, 1902 – May 15, 1953) was an American racing driver. He was killed in a crash in the south turn of the Indianapolis Motor Speedway during practice for the 1953 Indianapolis 500. During his long Indianapolis racing career, Miller earned the nickname "Dean of the Speedway."

Miller died at age 50 while driving a Novi-engined Special. He is interred at Crown Hill Cemetery (Community Mausoleum, B-19-A) in Indianapolis.

== World Drivers' Championship career ==
The AAA/USAC-sanctioned Indianapolis 500 was included in the FIA World Drivers' Championship from 1950 through 1960. Drivers competing at Indianapolis during those years were credited with World Drivers' Championship participation, and were eligible to score WDC points alongside those which they may have scored towards the AAA/USAC National Championship.

Miller participated in two World Drivers' Championship races at Indianapolis. His best finish was 25th place, and he scored no World Drivers' Championship points.

Upon Miller's death during practice for the 1953 Indianapolis 500, he became the first racing driver to die as a result of an accident during a World Drivers' Championship event.

== Motorsports career results ==
=== Indianapolis 500 results ===
| Year | Car | Start | Qual | Rank | Finish | Laps | Led | Retired |
|---|---|---|---|---|---|---|---|---|
| 1930 | 41 | 15 | 97.360 | 23 | 13 | 161 | 0 | Flagged |
| 1931 | 27 | 15 | 106.185 | 25 | 10 | 200 | 0 | Running |
| 1932 | 9 | 29 | 111.053 | 23 | 21 | 125 | 0 | Engine |
| 1933 | 28 | 32 | 112.025 | 23 | 20 | 163 | 0 | Rod |
| 1934 | 46 | 32 | 109.252 | 29 | 33 | 11 | 0 | Crash T1 |
| 1935 | 34 | 17 | 113.552 | 24 | 10 | 200 | 0 | Running |
| 1936 | 18 | 3 | 117.675 | 3 | 5 | 200 | 0 | Running |
| 1937 | 7 | 13 | 119.213 | 13 | 30 | 36 | 0 | Ignition |
| 1938 | 3 | 5 | 121.898 | 9 | 3rd | 200 | 0 | Running |
| 1939 | 3 | 5 | 126.318 | 8 | 21 | 109 | 0 | Crash BS |
| 1940 | 34 | 27 | 121.392 | 27 | 17 | 189 | 0 | Flagged |
| 1941 | 41 | 9 | 121.540 | 23 | 6 | 200 | 0 | Running |
| 1946 | 5 | 17 | 124.649 | 8 | 18 | 64 | 0 | Oil line |
| 1948 | 31 | 19 | 127.249 | 8 | 20 | 108 | 0 | Oil trouble |
| 1951 | 32 | 28 | 135.798 | 3 | 25 | 56 | 0 | Ignition |
| 1952 | 21 | 27 | 139.034 | 1 | 30 | 41 | 0 | Supercharger |
| Totals | | | | | | 2063 | 0 | |

| Starts | 16 |
| Poles | 0 |
| Front Row | 1 |
| Wins | 0 |
| Top 5 | 2 |
| Top 10 | 5 |
| Retired | 9 |

- Although Miller posted the fastest qualifying time for the 1952 Indianapolis 500, he started on the outside of the ninth row. No other fastest qualifier has started this far back in the field.
- Miller raced 2,061 laps, or 5,152.5 miles (8,292.1 km) at Indianapolis without leading a lap, an all-time record.

=== FIA World Drivers' Championship results ===
(key) (Races in italics indicate fastest lap)

| Year | Chassis | Engine | 1 | 2 | 3 | 4 | 5 | 6 | 7 | 8 | 9 | WDC | Points |
|---|---|---|---|---|---|---|---|---|---|---|---|---|---|
| 1950 | Kurtis Kraft | Offenhauser L4 | GBR | MON | 500; DNQ | SUI | BEL | FRA | ITA | | | NC | 0 |
| 1951 | Kurtis Kraft | Offenhauser L4 | SUI | 500; 25 | BEL | FRA | GBR | GER | ITA | ESP | | NC | 0 |
| 1952 | Kurtis Kraft | Offenhauser L4 | SUI | 500; 30 | BEL | FRA | GBR | GER | NED | ITA | | NC | 0 |
| 1953 | Kurtis Kraft | Offenhauser L4 | ARG | 500; DNQ | NED | BEL | FRA | GBR | GER | SUI | ITA | NC | 0 |

| Preceded by Cameron Earl | Formula One fatal accidents May 15, 1953 | Succeeded by Charles de Tornaco |
