= 1901 in motorsport =

The following is an overview of the events of 1901 in motorsport including the major racing events, motorsport venues that were opened and closed during a year, championships and non-championship events that were established and disestablished in a year, and births and deaths of racing drivers and other motorsport people.

== Births ==
Date	Month	Name	Nationality	Occupation	Note	Ref
17	July	Luigi Chinetti	Italian-American	Racing driver	24 Hours of Le Mans winner (1932, 1934 and 1949)	
19	December	Louis Schneider	American	Racing driver	Indianapolis 500 winner (1931).	
