= 1931 Indianapolis 500 =

American motor race

19th Indianapolis 500

Indianapolis Motor Speedway

Indianapolis 500
- Sanctioning body: AAA
- Date: May 30, 1931
- Winner: Louis Schneider
- Winning Riding Mechanic: Jigger Johnson
- Winning Entrant: B. L. Schneider
- Winning time: 5:10:27.93
- Average speed: 96.629 mph (155.509 km/h)
- Pole position: Russ Snowberger
- Pole speed: 112.796 mph (181.528 km/h)
- Most laps led: Billy Arnold (155)

Pre-race
- Pace car: Cadillac 370 Twelve
- Pace car driver: Willard "Big Boy" Rader
- Starter: Barney Oldfield
- Honorary referee: William S. Knudsen
- Estimated attendance: 165,000

Chronology
Previous	Next
1930	1932

The 19th International 500-Mile Sweepstakes Race was held at the Indianapolis Motor Speedway on Saturday, May 30, 1931. Race winner Louis Schneider, who led the final 34 laps, was accompanied by riding mechanic Jigger Johnson.

The start of the race was delayed two hours due to rain. Defending race winner Billy Arnold charged from 18th starting position to lead the race by lap 7. Arnold, who had dominated the 1930 race (led 198 laps), proceeded to lead the next 155 laps, and built up a five-lap lead over second place. His rear axle broke on lap 162. He spun in turn four, was hit by another car, driven by Luther Johnson, and went over the outside wall. One of his errant wheels bounced across Georgetown Road, and struck and killed an 11-year-old boy, Wilbur C. Brink. Arnold suffered a broken pelvis, and his riding mechanic, Spider Matlock, broke his shoulder.

The race was part of the 1931 AAA Championship Car season.

== Race schedule ==
Race schedule — May 1931
Sun	Mon	Tue	Wed	Thu	Fri	Sat
					1	2
3	4	5	6	7	8	9
10	11	12	13	14	15	16
17	18	19	20	21	22	23; Time Trials
24; Time Trials	25; Time Trials	26; Time Trials	27; Time Trials	28	29	30; Indy 500
31						

Color	Notes
Green	Track Available for Practice
Dark Blue	Time trials
Silver	Race day
Blank	No track activity

== Practice ==
The deadline for entries to be received was midnight on Friday May 1. A record 72 cars were entered, for 40 starting positions. The track was made available for practice at the beginning of the month, and most entries were expected to arrive mid-month.

=== Week 1 ===
- Tuesday May 5: A total of seven complete cars had arrived to the garage area. Tony Gulotta was one of few cars to take to the track during the first few days, turning in laps around 100 mph.
- Thursday May 7: breakups in the track surface were being repaired. Floyd "Sparky" Sparks practiced during the repair work, turning laps around 75-80 mph.

By the end of the first full week of practice, track activity had been sparse. Several of the top teams were expected to arrive within the next week. In addition, rain and cold weather kept drivers off the track over the weekend and into Monday.

=== Week 2 ===
- Tuesday May 12: Joe Russo, Jerry Houck, and L. L. Corum, were among at least four cars that took practice laps. Houck lost a wheel on the backstretch, but suffered no other damage to the car.
- Wednesday May 13: Track activity picked up in earnest on Wednesday, owing much to the fair weather. Leon Duray took to the track for the first time in his supercharged two-cycle, 16-cylinder, Stutz Bearcat, after much anticipation. But Duray suffered a stuck piston, sometime after running a lap of 112 mph. Other drivers taking laps included Tony Gulotta (103 mph) and Phil Pardee (90 mph). Billy Arnold and Harry Hartz took turns in Arnold's car, with laps reported in the 109-110 mph range. Joe Russo, repeating a stunt he performed a year earlier, took a lap around the Speedway blindfolded.
- Thursday May 14: Billy Arnold turned the fastest practice lap of the month at 110 mph. Owner Harry Hartz also took some test laps in Arnold's car. Russ Snowberger was the second-fastest of the day, clocking in at 106 mph. Other drivers on the track included, Ernie Triplett (103 mph), Buddy Marr (100 mph), L. L. Corum (93 mph), Joe Caccia (96 mph), Tony Gulotta, Howard Seecomb, and Phil Pardee. Louis Schneider took some initial laps with his riding mechanic Jigger Johnson, but an oil leak persisted. Johnson tried to plug the hole with his fingers, so the pair could complete at least a handful of laps, to no avail.
- Friday May 15: Stubby Stubblefield (109 mph) led the practice speeds on a fairly light day of track activity. Ernie Triplett (109 mph), Chet Miller (100 mph), L. L. Corum (94 mph), and Jerry Houck (over 90 mph), were among others that took to the track. Some participants left the grounds to attend the Kentucky Derby.
- Saturday May 16: Louis Meyer ran his first laps of the month in the 16-cylinder Sampson Special. Meyer completed a lap of 113.63 mph. Milton Jones fishtailed his car exiting turn three, and made contact with the inside wall. The cars was expected to be repaired.

=== Week 3 ===
- Sunday May 17: Cliff Durant took laps in Leon Duray's supercharged 16-cylinder car, hitting top speeds of 125 mph on the straights. The car, which had been suffering from overheating problems for the past few days, blew the top off the radiator. The team went to work to install a new radiator and water pump in time for qualifying. Louis Schneider and Tony Gulotta were both over 103 mph, while Joe Russo, and Chet Miller both hit laps of 100 mph. L. L. Corum (96 mph) was steadily increasing his speed as the days passed.
- Monday May 18: Cliff Durant was forced to fly to Michigan to tend to urgent business, leaving Leon Duray as the driver remaining behind to qualify their supercharged 16-cylinder machine. The team was still waiting for a replacement radiator from Detroit. Durant was expected to return and drive relief in the race if needed. Cliff Bergere was named to the Elco Royale entry, having tested it at around 102-104 mph. Babe Stapp also arrived at the track.
- Tuesday May 19: By Tuesday, at least 30 cars had arrived at the track. Arriving at the track were car builder Harry Miller and car owner William S. White. Their two cars, a 301-cubic inch, 16-cylinder machine to be driven by Shorty Cantlon, and a four-cylinder for Bert Karnatz, were en route from Los Angeles, expected for delivery on Wednesday. Miller and White kept the details of the much-anticipated 16-cylinder machine guarded. Of the cars on the track, Lou Moore in the twin 4-cylinder Coleman Special, raised eyebrows with a 104 mph lap.
- Wednesday May 20: Track activity was bustling by Wednesday, with many cars, mechanics, and representatives in the garage area. Russ Snowberger got some attention after he turned a lap of 113 mph in his nearly-stock motor Studebaker. Also fast for the day was Ernie Triplett (111 mph). The Bill White/Harry Miller 16-cylinder car was delivered to the track at noontime, and driver Shorty Cantlon immediately took to the track for some shakedown laps.
- Thursday May 21: One day after arriving at the track, Shorty Cantlon's Bill White/Harry Miller 16-cylinder machine broke a connecting rod and blew a hole in the crankcase. The catastrophic engine failure was traced to an error during assembly. Cantlon was out of contention for the pole position, and now had to wait for replacement parts and an engine rebuild. Also on the sidelines was Leon Duray, still waiting for delivery of a replacement radiator for the Durant 16-cylinder machine. At about 5 p.m., the steering failed on Frank Brisko's car, causing him to lose control in turn 4 and hit the inside wall. The car then rebounded and hit the outside wall, coming to rest in the middle of the track. The car suffered heavy damage to the front end and front axle. Brisko and his riding mechanic Fred Winnai were not seriously injured, and planned to make repairs.
- Friday May 22: The much-anticipated and much-talked about Cummins Diesel Special, entered by Clessie Cummins, arrived at the Speedway on Friday. Dave Evans took the diesel to the track and ran off laps of about 96-97 mph. Earlier in the month, officials had announced a special exemption rule for diesel-powered entries, to encourage their participation. Any diesel that completed the four-lap qualifying attempt in excess of 80 mph average, would qualify for the field, regardless of overall speed rank. The other gasoline-powered engines had a minimum speed of 90 mph in time trials.

== Time trials ==
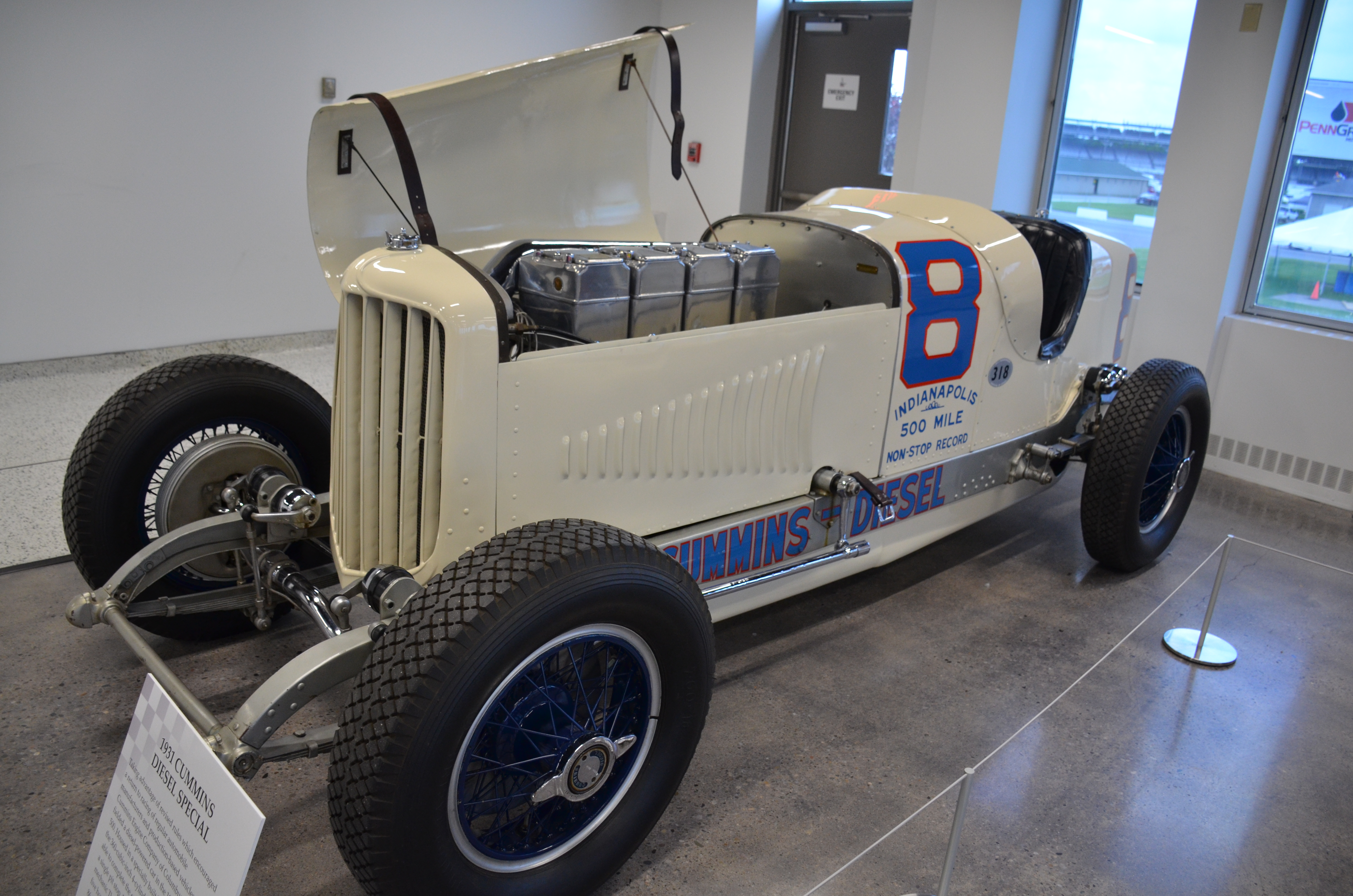
1931 Cummins Diesel

Four-lap (10 mile) qualifying runs were utilized, with 90 mph set as the required minimum speed. Diesel entries were allowed a special rules exception, given them a guaranteed starting position provided they complete their run at a speed of greater than 80 mph. Riding mechanics were required to accompany the drivers on all cars during qualifying.

=== Saturday May 23 ===
The first day of time trials was held Saturday May 23, with the track available for qualifying from 10:00 a.m. to 7:01 p.m. (sundown). The minimum qualifying speed for gasoline powered engines was set at 90 mph. Dave Evans was the first car out to qualify, in the Cummins Diesel Special. Evans completed his run at 96.871 mph, well above the 80 mph minimum speed required for diesel-powered entries.

Russ Snowberger won the pole position with a four-lap average speed of 112.796 mph. A total of 19 cars took to the track, but only 17 cars officially qualified. Rounding out the front row was Bill Cummings and first year driver Paul Bost. Snowberger winning the pole was a surprise, not only because his nearly-stock motor Studebaker outperformed Cummings and others, but three of the favorites for the pole did not even get to put in a time. Cummings first attempt early in the day started out with a lap of 115.001 mph, but he suffered a failed clutch. Cumming's second attempt run managed only a 112.563 mph, just 0.66 seconds shy of bumping Snowberger from the pole.

Shorty Cantlon was kept off the track for the whole weekend, still awaiting an engine rebuild. He was expected to qualify on Tuesday. Louis Meyer, another favorite, took to the track to make an attempt in the 16-cylinder Sampson Special. He came down the mainstretch, but lost control in turn one, brushing the inside and outside wall. He drove back to the pits with a bent frame, and would be forced to make repairs.

Defending pole position and race winner Billy Arnold was having trouble finding speed over the past couple of days, but scrambled to make an attempt late in the day on Saturday. He wheeled to the line at 7:08 p.m., past the deadline for the track to close. Officials decided to allow the run, and his four-lap average of 113.848 mph tentatively took the pole position. After the run, some drivers protested, and during a post-qualifying inspection, it was found that Arnold's brake cables were not connected. During the rush to get the car on the track, the crew had neglected to connect the brake cables, and technical committee chairman Louis Schwitzer disallowed the run.

Pos	No.	Name	Lap 1 (mph)	Lap 2 (mph)	Lap 3 (mph)	Lap 4 (mph)	Average Speed (mph)
1	4	(United States) Russ Snowberger	112.542	112.542	113.023	113.080	112.796
2	3	(United States) Bill Cummings	111.579	112.824	112.938	112.923	112.563
3	31	(United States) Paul Bost R	111.510	112.164	112.374	112.458	112.125
4	5	(United States) Deacon Litz	110.947	111.386	111.635	112.164	111.531
5	25	(United States) Ernie Triplett	112.191	110.592	111.193	110.294	111.034
6	39	(United States) Babe Stapp	110.429	110.105	110.375	109.596	110.125
7	17	(United States) Speed Gardner	109.556	109.569	110.335	109.676	109.820
8	34	(United States) Fred Frame	110.524	108.696	109.329	108.565	109.273
9	36	(United States) Stubby Stubblefield R	108.985	108.486	108.630	109.091	108.797
10	19	(United States) Ralph Hepburn	107.656	107.810	108.643	107.630	107.933
11	32	(United States) Phil Pardee R	107.591	107.746	108.134	107.617	107.772
12	57	(United States) Luther Johnson R	106.257	108.056	107.940	108.382	107.652
13	23	(United States) Louis Schneider	107.901	107.527	106.952	106.471	107.210
14	28	(United States) Cliff Bergere	106.207	106.749	107.130	107.041	106.781
15	27	(United States) Chet Miller	106.193	106.458	105.845	106.245	106.185
16	41	(United States) Joe Russo R	105.461	105.758	105.312	102.810	104.822
17	8	(United States) Dave Evans	96.577	96.267	97.213	97.464	96.871
	7	(United States) Louis Meyer W	Hit wall				Incomplete
DQ	1	(United States) Billy Arnold W	113.536	114.242	113.910	113.708	113.848*

* Disqualified

- Source: The Indianapolis News

=== Sunday May 24 ===
The second day of time trials was held on Sunday May 24. The track was for available for qualifying from 1 p.m. to 7:01 p.m. (sundown). Only two cars completed qualifying runs. One day after having his run disallowed, Billy Arnold put his car in the field at 116.080 mph. He became the fastest qualifier in the field.

During a practice run, the car of Floyd "Sparky" Sparks caught on fire down the backstretch, ignited from an oil or gasoline leak. Attempting to close off the fuel line, he hit the retaining wall in turn three. The car was badly burned. Sparks would not be able to qualify.

Tony Gulotta was the only other driver to complete a qualifying attempt. Gulotta left the Bowes Seal Fast team and instead moved over to the Hunt Special entered by Ab Jenkins. Freddie Winnai took his old seat. Gulotta would have been fast enough for the second row, but as a second day qualifier, he would line up 19th on the grid. Lou Moore tried to qualify Pete DePaolo's Boyle Valve Special, but a broken clutch prevented the attempt. At the end of the day, the field was filled to 19 cars, with 21 spots remaining.

Pos	No.	Name	Lap 1 (mph)	Lap 2 (mph)	Lap 3 (mph)	Lap 4 (mph)	Average Speed (mph)
18	1	(United States) Billy Arnold W	116.009	116.294	116.505	115.518	116.080
19	37	(United States) Tony Gulotta	110.497	111.885	112.122	112.416	111.725

- Source: The Indianapolis News

=== Monday May 25 ===
The third day of qualifying was held Monday May 25, with the track available from 2 p.m. to 7:02 p.m. (sundown). The day was marred by the fatal accident of Joe Caccia and his riding mechanic Clarence Grover. Caccia was on the track in the morning for a practice run, when the car skidded out of control entering turn 2. The car slid about 150 feet, and then slid into the outside barrier. The car ripped a hole through the outside retaining wall, hurtled 100 feet down the embankment, and crashed into a tree. Both drivers were likely thrown from the car, landed next to it, and the car had burst into flames. Both drivers were killed instantly, and were enveloped by the flames.

Five cars completed qualification runs, filling the field to 24 cars. Jimmy Gleason (111.400 mph) was the fastest car of the day. Frank Farmer, formerly of the M.A. Yagle entry, took over the Jones-Miller Special, and was the second-fastest car of the day.

Still yet to qualify was Shorty Cantlon, who practiced unofficially over 118 mph, but suffered a broken universal joint during the day.

Pos	No.	Name	Lap 1 (mph)	Lap 2 (mph)	Lap 3 (mph)	Lap 4 (mph)	Average Speed (mph)
20	33	(United States) Jimmy Gleason	111.386	111.372	111.180	111.663	111.400
21	67	(United States) Francis Quinn R	110.633	110.375	112.122	112.177	111.321
22	35	(United States) Frank Farmer	106.952	108.382	108.604	109.290	108.303
23	12	(United States) Phil Shafer	105.325	105.461	104.676	104.956	105.103
24	48	(United States) John Boling	102.214	103.842	102.215	103.187	102.860

- Source: The Indianapolis News

=== Tuesday May 26 ===
The fourth day of qualifying was held Tuesday May 26, with the track available from 2 p.m. to 7:02 p.m. (sundown). Nine cars completed runs, led by Louis Meyer in the Samson Special. Meyer was qualified comfortably, though probably below his potential speed, said to be playing it safe after his crash on Saturday. After considerable delay, Shorty Cantlon put his 16-cylinder machine in the field, as did Leon Duray. Duray had been suffering from overheating issues all week, and observers noted he qualified with water boiling from the radiator, indicating the problems were still not solved.

Pos	No.	Name	Lap 1 (mph)	Lap 2 (mph)	Lap 3 (mph)	Lap 4 (mph)	Average Speed (mph)
25	7	(United States) Louis Meyer W	113.953	113.236	113.536	113.364	113.522
26	2	(United States) Shorty Cantlon	111.331	110.281	109.743	110.146	110.372
27	16	(United States) Frank Brisko	106.107	106.032	106.345	106.660	106.286
28	24	(United States) Freddie Winnai	104.408	105.870	106.245	107.066	105.899
29	54	(United States) Leon Duray	103.365	103.579	102.987	102.611	103.134
30	44	(United States) George Howie R	102.857	103.199	103.128	102.354	102.844
31	72	(United States) Al Aspen R	102.203	102.951	102.308	102.576	102.509
32	58	(United States) George Wingerter R	99.580	100.200	100.503	100.279	100.139
33	49	(United States) Harry Butcher	99.130	99.913	99.393	99.536	99.343
	45	(United States) Marion Trexler	94	94			Incomplete
	9	(United States) Gordon Condon					Incomplete

- Source: The Indianapolis News

=== Wednesday May 27 ===
The final day of qualifying was held Wednesday May 26, with the track available from 2 p.m. to 7:04 p.m. (sundown). The day opening with seven spots remaining in the grid. Out of a total of 72 entries, upwards of twenty cars were considered available for time trials.

During a busy day of track activity, a total of eight cars qualified for the starting field, filling the grid to 40 cars. At least twelve other cars attempted to qualify, but were too slow or failed to complete their run. The fastest car of the day was Gene Haustein (107.823 mph), followed by Myron Stevens.

Car owner Fred Clemmons managed to get both of his Hoosier Pete entries qualified, despite the cars only arriving at the track for the first time Wednesday morning. Billy Winn and Herman Schurch both took to the track for shake down laps at slow speed, and practiced for only about 45 minutes. The cars were brought to the garage for adjustments to the springs and shock absorbers, and later in the afternoon were safely qualified to the grid with only about 20 laps of practice each.

Wilbur Shaw and Ralph DePalma were both at the track Wednesday, looking to qualify. Officials deemed that DePalma had not arrived in enough time to qualify, and the car he was to drive had not shown sufficient speed. Shaw took to the track for a qualifying attempt late in the day, but he pulled off with a broken crankshaft before starting the run.

With less than fifteen minutes remaining in the day, Joe Huff was the final qualifier. Huff would have "crowded out" Harry Butcher, the slowest qualifier. After qualifying was over, however, Pete Kreis in the Coleman Special withdrew due to handling problems. As a result, Harry Butcher in the Butcher Brothers Special was restored to the starting field.

The track was to be available on Thursday for final "carburation tests." No track activity was scheduled for Friday.

Pos	No.	Name	Lap 1 (mph)	Lap 2 (mph)	Lap 3 (mph)	Lap 4 (mph)	Average Speed (mph)	Notes
34	26	(United States) Gene Haustein R	107.823	107.953	108.551	109.263	108.395	
35	21	(United States) Myron Stevens R	108.084	107.258	107.501	107.092	107.463	
36	55	(United States) Billy Winn R	103.878	105.522	105.345	106.408	105.405	
37	59	(United States) Sam Ross	106.070	104.846	104.603	103.093	104.642	Bumped Decker
38	14	(United States) Lou Moore	100.435	101.420	105.845	107.540	103.725	
39	10	(United States) Herman Schurch	103.914	104.034	102.041	101.443	102.845	Bumped Chamberlain
40	69	(United States) Joe Huff	101.660	102.145	102.857	102.592	102.386	
Failed to qualify
WD		(United States) Pete Kreis	102.599	102.110	103.022	103.722	102.386	Withdrew
	68	(United States) Ted Chamberlain	99.075	99.294	99.591	98.771	99.182	Bumped by Schurch
		(United States) Rick Decker	96.717	99.097	97.224	97.234	98.061	Bumped by Ross
	29	(United States) L. L. Corum	97.826	98.200	97.255	96.298	97.389	Too slow
	46	(United States) Bill Denver	96.164	96.630	96.144	95.673	96.085	Bumped by Decker
	45	(United States) C. C. Reeder	95.592	96.010	95.694	95.278	95.643	
	53	(United States) Joe Thomas	89.295	92.034	92.270	92.081	91.403	
	66	(United States) Benny Brandfon	89.047	89.091	88.114	88.002	88.561	Below 90 mph minimum speed
	15	(United States) Bert Karnatz	102.203	100.773	100.919		Incomplete	Burned bearing
	63	(United States) Malcolm Fox	102.203	102.529			Incomplete	Broken connecting rod
	56	(United States) Jimmy Patterson	93.091	93.950			Incomplete	Engine failure
	6	(United States) Wilbur Shaw					Incomplete	Pulled off track

- Source: The Indianapolis News

== Starting grid ==
Row	Inside	Middle	Outside
1	(United States) Russ Snowberger	(United States) Bill Cummings	(United States) Paul Bost R
2	(United States) Deacon Litz	(United States) Ernie Triplett	(United States) Babe Stapp
3	(United States) Speed Gardner	(United States) Fred Frame	(United States) Stubby Stubblefield R
4	(United States) Ralph Hepburn	(United States) Phil Pardee R	(United States) Luther Johnson R
5	(United States) Louis Schneider	(United States) Cliff Bergere	(United States) Chet Miller
6	(United States) Joe Russo R	(United States) Dave Evans	(United States) Billy Arnold W
7	(United States) Tony Gulotta	(United States) Jimmy Gleason	(United States) Francis Quinn R
8	(United States) Frank Farmer	(United States) Phil Shafer	(United States) John Boling
9	(United States) Louis Meyer W	(United States) Shorty Cantlon	(United States) Frank Brisko
10	(United States) Freddie Winnai	(United States) Leon Duray	(United States) George Howie R
11	(United States) Al Aspen R	(United States) George Wingerter R	(United States) Harry Butcher
12	(United States) Gene Haustein R	(United States) Myron Stevens R	(United States) Billy Winn R
13	(United States) Sam Ross	(United States) Lou Moore	(United States) Herman Schurch
14	(United States) Joe Huff		

=== Alternates ===
- First alternate: Ted Chamberlain

=== Failed to qualify ===
- Pete Kreis (withdrew)
- Rick Decker (bumped)
- Bill Denver (bumped)
- Lora L. Corum (too slow; drove relief during the race)
- C.C. Reeder (too slow)
- Joe Thomas (too slow)
- Ben Brandfon (too slow)
- Bert Karnatz (incomplete attempt)
- Malcolm Fox (incomplete attempt)
- James Patterson (incomplete attempt)
- Marion Trexler (incomplete attempt)
- Gordon Condon (incomplete attempt)
- Wilbur Shaw (incomplete attempt; drove relief during race)
- Joe Caccia (fatal practice crash)
- Wesley Crawford
- Bryan Saulpaugh
- Eddie Burbach
- Ralph DePalma (insufficient speed)
- Dusty Fahrnow
- Norske Larson
- Charles Moran
- Milt Marion
- Rollin May
- Zeke Meyer
- Wally Zale
- Roy Painter
- Carl Smith
- Floyd "Sparky" Sparks (car fire)
- Johnny Seymour
- Ab Jenkins (illness)
- Jerry Houck
- Milton Jones
- Peter DePaolo

== Race recap ==
=== Start ===
Overnight and morning rain delayed the start from 10:00 a.m. to 12 p.m. The Indianapolis Drum and Bugle Corps. paraded and entertained the early arriving fans, including Governor Harry G. Leslie and his entourage of seven other state governors. At noon, pace car driver Willard "Big Boy" Rader guided the field in the Cadillac 370 V-12 pace car for one unscored pace lap. Speedway general manager Theodore E. Meyers rode as a passenger. Rader and Meyers pulled over on the mainstretch, and the green flag was displayed for the flying start. The race began with Paul Bost grabbing the lead from the outside of the front row. Bost led the first two laps. Bill Cummings took the lead for laps 3–6.

Defending winner Billy Arnold, who started 18th (and was the fastest qualifier), went on a tear through the field at the start. He passed 17 cars, and took the lead on lap 7. He picked up where he left off a year earlier, and started pulling out to about a 15-second lead.

After suffering constant overheating problems during practice and time trials, Leon Duray pitted his car after only six laps. The overheating problems persisted and he finished 37th.

=== First half ===
On lap 33, rain returned to the area, and brought out the yellow flag. The race was slowed and run under the yellow flag for about the next 28 laps. Drivers were required to slow down to about an 80 mph pace, and passing was not allowed unless except those cars that entered the pit area.

The drizzling stopped, and the green flag came back out on the 61st lap. Only a few laps later, the yellow flag came out again when Wilbur Shaw (driving relief for Phil Pardee) wrecked spectacularly in turn three. The car leaped over the outside wall, and down the embankment. Shaw was uninjured, and walked back to the pits, ready to relieve another driver. While the crash was being cleaned up, more rain began to fall, and the yellow remained out for several minutes more.

By lap 70, the rain had stopped and the green flag was back out with Billy Arnold still leading. Ralph Hepburn was running second, Tony Gulotta third, Russ Snowberger fourth, and Fred Frame fifth. Bill Cummings dropped out after completing 70 laps due to an oil leak. On lap 94, Cummins took over the car of Deacon Litz. Also dropping out early with an oil leak was Louis Meyer (28 laps). He got back in the race on lap 73, taking over as relief for Myron Stevens.

Billy Arnold continued to lead at the halfway point.

=== Second half ===
Louis Schneider made his first and only pit stop on lap 106, taking on gasoline and oil, as well as changing the right rear tire. After surviving a spectacular crash in the first half, Wilbur Shaw was back in the race on lap 118, this time driving a stint of relief for Jimmy Gleason.

After leading 155 laps, Billy Arnold crashed on lap 162. In turn four, Arnold spun, and lost a wheel. He was hit by the car of Luther Johnson. Arnold's car burst into flames, and hit the concrete wall. It slid for about 200 feet, and Arnold and his riding mechanic Spider Matlock were thrown from the machine. A wheel from Arnold's wrecked car bounced over the wall and across the street, striking and killing an 11-year-old boy playing in his yard. Johnson's car flipped over, but he was not seriously injured.

Louis Schneider took the lead after Arnold's crash. Five laps later Tony Gulotta crashed in nearly the same spot as Arnold. Gulotta's car slid into the inside wall, then bounced up to the outside guardrail, ripping a portion of the barrier out, Neither Gulotta nor his riding mechanic were seriously injured.

With 30 laps to go, Schneider and second place Bill Cummings were nose-to-tail, battling for the lead. Cummings had taken over the car of Deacon Litz. Cummings hit the wall in the south short chute on lap 177, leaving Schneider all alone out in front. Schneider led the final 39 laps en route to victory, and won by 43.19 seconds over second place Fred Frame. At the time, it was the second-closest margin of victory in Indianapolis 500 history.

Polesitter Russ Snowberger was one of three drivers in the top five to complete the race without relief help. The car of Myron Stevens, with Louis Meyer driving relief for most of the race, charged from 35th starting position to 4th place, a remarkable gain of 31 positions at the finish.

== Box score ==
Finish	Start	No	Name	Entrant	Chassis	Engine	Qual	Rank	Laps	Status
1	13	23	(United States) Louis Schneider	B. L. Schneider	Stevens	Miller	107.210	22	200	96.629 mph
2	8	34	(United States) Fred Frame	Harry Hartz	Duesenberg	Duesenberg	109.273	14	200	Running
3	10	19	(United States) Ralph Hepburn (Pete Kreis Laps 90–143)	Ralph Hepburn	Miller	Miller	107.933	18	200	Running
4	35	21	(United States) Myron Stevens R (Louis Meyer Laps 73–200)	Louis Meyer	Stevens	Miller	107.463	21	200	Running
5	1	4	(United States) Russ Snowberger	Russell Snowberger	Snowberger	Studebaker	112.796	3	200	Running
6	20	33	(United States) Jimmy Gleason (Wilbur Shaw Laps 118–169)	Denny Dusenberg	Duesenberg	Duesenberg	111.400	8	200	Running
7	5	25	(United States) Ernie Triplett	James H. Booth	Duesenberg	Duesenberg	111.034	10	200	Running
8	9	36	(United States) Stubby Stubblefield R	Milton Jones	Willys-Knight	Miller	108.797	15	200	Running
9	14	28	(United States) Cliff Bergere	Elco Grease & Oil Company	Reo	Reo	106.781	23	200	Running
10	15	27	(United States) Chet Miller (Bryan Saulpaugh Laps 104–152)	R. G. "Buddy" Marr	Hudson	Hudson	106.185	25	200	Running
11	30	44	(United States) George Howie R (L. L. Corum Laps 86–112) (Herman Schurch Laps 113–200)	George N. Howie	Dodge	Chrysler	102.844	35	200	Running
12	23	12	(United States) Phil Shafer	Phil Shafer	Rigling	Buick	105.103	28	200	Running
13	17	8	(United States) Dave Evans	Cummins Engine Company	Duesenberg	Cummins	96.871	40	200	Running
14	31	72	(United States) Al Aspen R (Bill Denver Laps 112–161)	William Alberti	Duesenberg	Duesenberg	102.509	36	200	Running
15	37	59	(United States) Sam Ross	William M. Yahr	Rigling	Miller	104.642	30	200	Running
16	40	69	(United States) Joe Huff (Speed Gardner Laps 117–148)	S. C. Goldberg	Cooper	Miller	102.386	37	180	Flagged
17	4	5	(United States) Deacon Litz (Bill Cummings Laps 94–177)	Henry Maley	Duesenberg	Duesenberg	111.531	7	177	Crash T1
18	19	37	(United States) Tony Gulotta	D. A. "Ab" Jenkins	Rigling	Studebaker	111.725	6	167	Crash T4
19	18	1	(United States) Billy Arnold W	Harry Hartz	Summers	Miller	116.080	1	162	Crash T4
20	12	57	(United States) Luther Johnson R	William H. Richards	Studebaker	Studebaker	107.652	20	156	Crash T4
21	36	55	(United States) Billy Winn R (James Patterson Laps 55–121)	F. E. Clemons	Rigling	Clemons	105.405	27	138	Flagged
22	27	16	(United States) Frank Brisko	Frank Brisko	Stevens	Miller	106.286	24	138	Steering arm
23	34	26	(United States) Gene Haustein R	Fronty-Ford Sales of Michigan	Ford T	Fronty-Ford	108.395	16	117	Lost wheel
24	16	41	(United States) Joe Russo R	George A. Henry	Rigling	Duesenberg	104.822	29	109	Oil leak
25	7	17	(United States) Speed Gardner (Wesley Crawford Laps 58–107)	C. E. Ricketts	Miller	Miller	109.820	13	107	Frame
26	38	14	(United States) Lou Moore	M. J. Boyle	Miller	Miller	103.725	31	103	Differential
27	26	2	(United States) Shorty Cantlon	William S. White	Miller	Miller	110.372	11	88	Rod
28	2	3	(United States) Bill Cummings	Empire State Gas Motors	Cooper	Miller	112.563	4	70	Oil line
29	28	24	(United States) Freddie Winnai	B. L. Schneider	Stevens	Miller	105.899	26	60	Crash NC
30	11	32	(United States) Phil Pardee R (Wilbur Shaw Laps 27–60)	Phil Pardee	Duesenberg	Duesenberg	107.772	19	60	Crash T3
31	3	31	(United States) Paul Bost R	Empire State Gas Motors	Cooper	Miller	112.125	5	35	Crankshaft
32	22	35	(United States) Frank Farmer	Milton Jones	Willys-Knight	Miller	108.303	17	32	Rod bearing
33	32	58	(United States) George Wingerter R	George Wingerter	Duesenberg	Duesenberg	100.139	38	29	Fuel tank
34	25	7	(United States) Louis Meyer W	Alden Sampson II	Stevens	Miller	113.953	2	28	Oil leak
35	6	39	(United States) Babe Stapp	Rigling & Henning	Rigling	Duesenberg	110.125	12	9	Oil leak/clutch
36	24	48	(United States) John Boling	Grahpo Metal Packing Company	M&B	M&B	102.860	33	7	Rod
37	29	54	(United States) Leon Duray	Leon Duray	Stevens:Whippet	Duray	103.134	32	6	Overheating
38	33	49	(United States) Harry Butcher	Harry H. Butcher	Buick	Buick	99.343	39	6	Crash T4
39	39	10	(United States) Herman Schurch	F. E. Clemons	Rigling	Clemons	102.845	34	5	Transmission
40	21	67	(United States) Francis Quinn R	James H. Wade	Miller	Ford A	111.321	9	3	Rear axle

Note: Relief drivers in parentheses

W Former Indianapolis 500 winner

R Indianapolis 500 Rookie

=== Race statistics ===
Lap Leaders
Laps	Leader
1–2	Paul Bost
3–6	Bill Cummings
7–161	Billy Arnold
162–200	Louis Schneider

Total laps led
Driver	Laps
Billy Arnold	155
Louis Schneider	39
Bill Cummings	4
Paul Bost	2

== Race details ==
- For 1931, riding mechanics were required.
- Dave Evans drove the Cummins Diesel Special entered by Clessie Cummins. During time trials, a special exception rule was made for diesel-powered engines which stated that if a diesel entry completed the four-lap qualifying run in excess of 80 mph average, it would qualify for the field, regardless of overall speed rank. Evans qualified at over 96 mph, but ranked 43rd overall. Evans was given the 40th and last starting position. On race day he finished 13th, performing the remarkable feat of completing the entire 500 miles without a pit stop. At some point during the race, Evans and his riding mechanic Thane Houser noticed that the water temperature was running high. Houser signaled back to the pit area, but Jimmy Doolittle who was working as the pit communicator, could not understand the message. Doolittle had misplaced a piece of paper which contained the key to the hand signals. Evans continued, having received no instruction from the pit area. After the race, Doolittle found the paper stuffed in his belt of his coat.

== See also ==
- 1931 AAA Championship Car season

== Works cited ==
- Indianapolis 500 Historical Stats: 1931
- ChampCarStats.com - 1931 International 500 Mile Sweepstakes
- Hear the Indianapolis 500 As it Sounded 84 Years Ago

1930 Indianapolis 500; Billy Arnold	1931 Indianapolis 500; Louis Schneider	1932 Indianapolis 500; Fred Frame
