= 1935 AAA Championship Car season =

Auto racing season

- AAA National Championship Trail

Season
- Races: 6
- Start date: May 30
- End date: October 13

Awards
- National champion: (United States) Kelly Petillo
- Indianapolis 500 winner: (United States) Kelly Petillo

The 1935 AAA Championship Car season consisted of six races, beginning in Speedway, Indiana on May 30 and concluding in Langhorne, Pennsylvania on October 13. There was one non-championship event. The AAA National Champion and Indianapolis 500 winner was Kelly Petillo.

During the Indianapolis 500, Johnny Hannon died in practice, Stubby Stubblefield died while qualifying, and Clay Weatherly died during the race.

== Schedule and results ==
All races running on Dirt/Brick Oval.

Rnd	Date	Race name	Track	Location	Type	Pole position	Winning driver
1	May 30	(United States) International 500 Mile Sweepstakes	Indianapolis Motor Speedway	Speedway, Indiana	Brick	(United States) Rex Mays	(United States) Kelly Petillo
2	July 4	(United States) St. Paul 100	Minnesota State Fair Speedway	Hamline, Minnesota	Dirt	(United States) Deacon Litz	(United States) Kelly Petillo
3	August 24	(United States) Springfield 100	Illinois State Fairgrounds	Springfield, Illinois	Dirt	(United States) Kelly Petillo	(United States) Billy Winn
4	September 2	(United States) Syracuse 100	New York State Fairgrounds	Syracuse, New York	Dirt	(United States) Billy Winn	(United States) Billy Winn
5	September 7	(United States) Altoona 100	Altoona Speedway	Tyrone, Pennsylvania	Dirt	(United States) Floyd Roberts	(United States) Louis Meyer
6	October 13	(United States) Langhorne 100	Langhorne Speedway	Langhorne, Pennsylvania	Dirt	(United States) Billy Winn	(United States) Kelly Petillo
NC	December 15	(United States) Ascot 125	Legion Ascot Speedway	Alhambra, California	Dirt	(United States) Floyd Roberts	(United States) Rex Mays

Non-championship race

== Final points standings ==
Note: Drivers had to be running at the finish to score points. Points scored by drivers sharing a ride were split according to percentage of race driven. Starters were not allowed to score points as relief drivers, if a race starter finished the race in another car, in a points scoring position, those points were awarded to the driver who had started the car.
The final standings based on reference.

Pos	Driver	INDY (United States)	HAM (United States)	SPR (United States)	SYR (United States)	ALT (United States)	LAN (United States)	Pts
1	(United States) Kelly Petillo	1*	1	**6**	14	Wth	1*	890
2	(United States) Bill Cummings	3	2		2	6	8	630
3	(United States) Wilbur Shaw	2	4		16	8		550
4	(United States) Floyd Roberts	4		DNQ	DNQ	**3**	3	510
5	(United States) Billy Winn	6		1	**1***	Wth	**2**	408.7
6	(United States) Chet Gardner	7		4	DNQ	DNQ	9	270
7	(United States) Shorty Cantlon	6	13		6	Wth		221.3
8	(United States) Louis Meyer	12	6		8	1*		200
9	(United States) Ralph Hepburn	5						198
10	(United States) Doc MacKenzie	9		10	4			170
11	(United States) Frank Brisko	23	DNQ		DNS	2	4	160
12	(United States) Al Miller	15	3		3	14		160
13	(United States) Deacon Litz	8	**5**		5	DNQ		152.3
14	(United States) Gene Haustein	5		DSQ	DNQ		6	152
15	(United States) George Barringer	24		2	DNS	12	5	150
16	(United States) Chet Miller	10		DNQ	DNQ	7		90
17	(United States) Emil Andres RY	DNQ	DNQ	3				80
18	(United States) Babe Stapp	25	14		15	4		70
19	(United States) Ken Fowler R			11		5	DNQ	60
20	(United States) Overton Snell	DNQ		5				60
21	(United States) Russ Snowberger	27	9		7	13		60
22	(United States) Floyd Davis R		8		9	10		60
23	(United States) Johnny Sawyer	8	11	9	11	DNQ		43.5
24	(United States) Fred Frame	11	7		13	Wth		40
25	(United States) Bill Schindler R						8	30
26	(United States) Henry Banks R				12	9		20
27	(United States) Lou Moore	18	DNQ		10			10
28	(United States) Maynard Clark R		10					10
-	(United States) Ray Carter R						7	0
-	(United States) Milt Marion R			7				0
-	(United States) George Bailey	26		8			14	0
-	(United States) George Wingerter				DNQ		10	0
-	(United States) Charles Tramison R					11		0
-	(United States) John Cebula R						11	0
-	(United States) Mauri Rose	20	12		DNQ	DNQ		0
-	(United States) Harry Hunt	DNQ	DNQ	12				0
-	(United States) Vern Ornduff R						12	0
-	(United States) Zeke Meyer	DNQ			DNS		13	0
-	(United States) Cliff Bergere	13						0
-	(United States) Harris Insinger	14						0
-	(United States) Ted Horn R	16	DNQ					0
-	(United States) Rex Mays	**17**						0
-	(United States) George Connor R	19						0
-	(United States) Paul Bost	20						0
-	(United States) Tony Gulotta	21						0
-	(United States) Jimmy Snyder R	22	DNQ					0
-	(United States) Johnny Seymour	24						0
-	(United States) Louis Tomei	28						0
-	(United States) Bob Sall	29						0
-	(United States) Al Gordon	30	DNQ					0
-	(United States) Freddie Winnai	31			DNS	DNQ	DNQ	0
-	(United States) Clay Weatherly R	32						0
-	(United States) Harry McQuinn	33						0
-	(United States) Dave Evans	DNQ	DNQ					0
-	(United States) Gus Zarka					DNQ	DNQ	0
-	(United States) Herb Ardinger	DNQ						0
-	(United States) L. L. Corum	DNQ						0
-	(United States) Wesley Crawford	DNQ						0
-	(United States) Dusty Fahrnow	DNQ						0
-	(United States) Johnny Hannon	DNQ						0
-	(United States) Herschell McKee	DNQ						0
-	(United States) Floyd O'Neal	DNQ						0
-	(United States) Roy Painter	DNQ						0
-	(United States) Johnny Rae	DNQ						0
-	(United States) Phil Shafer	DNQ						0
-	(United States) Stubby Stubblefield	DNQ						0
-	(United States) Doc Williams	DNQ						0
-	(United States) Robert Wilson	DNQ						0
-	(United States) Muir		DNQ					0
-	(United States) Ted Chamberlain				DNQ			0
-	(United States) Gene Pirong				DNQ			0
-	(United States) George Metzler				DNQ			0
-	(United States) Myron Stevens					DNQ		0
-	(United States) Ivan Mikan					DNQ		0
-	(United States) Don Church						DNQ	0
-	(United States) Duke Nalon	Wth						0
Pos	Driver	INDY (United States)	HAM (United States)	SPR (United States)	SYR (United States)	ALT (United States)	LAN (United States)	Pts

Color	Result
Gold	Winner
Silver	2nd place
Bronze	3rd place
Green	4th & 5th place
Light Blue	6th-10th place
Dark Blue	Finished (Outside Top 10)
Purple	Did not finish (Ret)
Red	Did not qualify (DNQ)
Brown	Withdrawn (Wth)
Black	Disqualified (DSQ)
White	Did not start (DNS)
Blank	Did not participate (DNP)
Blank	Not competing

**In-line notation**
**Bold**	Pole position
Italics	Ran fastest race lap
*	Led most race laps
Rookie of the Year
Rookie

== See also ==
- 1935 Indianapolis 500
