= Walt Ader =

American racing driver (1912–1982)

- Born: Walter Ader; December 15, 1912 Long Valley, New Jersey, U.S.
- Died: November 25, 1982 (aged 69) Califon, New Jersey, U.S.

Champ Car career
- 33+ races run over 4 years
- Best finish: 6th (1946)
- First race: 1946 Williams Grove Race #1 (Mechanicsburg)
- Last race: 1950 Indianapolis 500 (Indianapolis)
- First win: 1946 Williams Grove Race #1 (Mechanicsburg)
- Last win: 1947 Atlanta 100 (Lakewood)
Wins	Podiums	Poles
5	18	0

Formula One World Championship career
- Active years: 1950
- Team: Rae
- Entries: 1
- Championships: 0
- Wins: 0
- Podiums: 0
- Career points: 0
- Pole positions: 0
- Fastest laps: 0
- First entry: 1950 Indianapolis 500

Walter Ader (December 15, 1912 – November 25, 1982) was an American racing driver.

During his racing career, Ader was a resident of Bernardsville, New Jersey. After his retirement from racing, Ader worked as a member of the Bernardsville volunteer fire department.

== World Drivers' Championship career ==
The AAA/USAC-sanctioned Indianapolis 500 was included in the FIA World Drivers' Championship from 1950 through 1960. Drivers competing at Indianapolis during those years were credited with World Drivers' Championship participation, and were eligible to score WDC points alongside those which they may have scored towards the AAA/USAC National Championship.

Ader participated in one World Drivers' Championship race at Indianapolis. He finished in 22nd place, and he scored no World Drivers' Championship points.

== Racing record ==
=== Indianapolis 500 results ===
Year	Car	Start	Qual	Rank	Finish	Laps	Led	Retired
1950	27	29	129.940	25	22	123	0	Flagged
**Totals**						123	0	

Starts	1
Poles	0
Front Row	0
Wins	0
Top 5	0
Top 10	0
Retired	0

=== Complete AAA Championship Car results ===
(key) (Races in bold indicate pole position)

Year	Team	1	2	3	4	5	6	7	8	9	10	11	12	13	Rank	Points	Ref
1946	Norm Olson Racing	INDY	LAN	ATL	ISF	MIL; 13	GOS								NC	0	
1947	Norm Olson	INDY; DNQ	MIL; 17					GOS; DNQ							13th	**380**	
1947	Tucker Partners			LAN; 7											13th	**380**	
1947	Paul Weirck				ATL; 1										13th	**380**	
1947	William Schoof					BAI; 10	MIL; 12		MIL; 17	PIK					13th	**380**	
1947	Andrews										SPR; 6	ARL			13th	**380**	
1948	Fred Peters	ARL	INDY; DNQ	MIL											NC	**0**	
1948	Bill Corley				LAN; 10	MIL	SPR	MIL	DQN	ATL	PIK	SPR	DQN		NC	**0**	
1950	Sampson Manufacturing	INDY; 22	MIL; DNQ	LAN; DNQ	SPR; DNQ	MIL	PIK	SYR; Wth	DET	SPR	SAC	PHX	BAY	DAR	NC	**0**	

=== Complete World Drivers' Championship results ===
(key)

Year	Entrant	Chassis	Engine	1	2	3	4	5	6	7	WDC	Points
1950	Sampson Manufacturing	Rae	Offenhauser L4	GBR	MON	500; 22	SUI	BEL	FRA	ITA	NC	0
