= Fred Clemons =

American engineer (1889–1945)

- Born: Frederick Earl Clemons; February 14, 1889 Greensburg, Indiana, U.S.
- Died: February 10, 1945 (aged 55) Indianapolis, Indiana, U.S.

Champ Car career
- 2 races run over 1 year
- First race: 1910 Remy Grand Trophy (Indianapolis)
- Last race: 1910 Indianapolis Race #9 (Indianapolis)
Wins	Podiums	Poles
0	0	0

Frederick Earl "Skinny" Clemons (February 14, 1889 – February 10, 1945) was an American race car designer and racing driver. He was one of the first entrants at the Indianapolis 500. He designed and built his own cars, engines and created his own Independent wheel suspension which he patented in 1934. An identification letter 'C’ or ‘Cm ' often appears in front of the race numbers on Clemons' cars. Lou Meyer, Joe Russo, Wilber Shaw and many other race drivers drove his cars.

== Early life ==
Clemons was the son of Anna L. Clemons. He attended the Emmerich manual training school Greensburg, Indiana. His father and grandfather bred and trained race horses.

== Auto racing ==
Clemons built two cars for the McFarland motor company in 1910 in his workshop/garage, which was at the site of the present ‘World War’ memorial in Indianapolis.

The first race car designed and built by Clemons was driven in competition by Wilbur Shaw.

The ‘Automotive Racing Records’ of the 1910 Labor Day Race indicate that Clemons' car No. 24 was entered by the National McFarland carriage company, and finished fifth.

In 1911, Clemons and a teammate entered the International 500-Mile Sweepstakes with the McFarland car No 22, but they did not qualify. Clemons was also the co-driver of car No 6 with Frank Fox, a Pope/Hartford, which finished 22nd.

Clemons worked for the Chevrolet brothers, and they used his model ‘T’ automobile to test the first eight valve Fronty head’ engine. In 1921, while Clemons was shop foreman for Frontenac, the first Fronty-Ford cylinder head was installed in a ‘Skinny’ Clemons car, which was the fastest Ford racer at the time,. Although the car overturned at high speed during the test of the engine conversion, the new head proved successful and subsequently went into production.

Clemons built both sprint and board track cars, using chassis which he designed and chain drive overhead cam Clemons-designed four cylinder engines.

The first Clemons chassis was narrow with front cart springs. A photo of this car can be seen in Wilbur Shaw's autobiography, Gentlemen, start your engines. In 1925/1926 Lou Schneider and Wilbur Shaw both drove for Clemons.

Clemons' later four cylinder chassis included deep-sectioned side rails with a raised section over the front axle, which carried the oil tank. The rear section was deep-skirted. The front and rear cross-members were tubular with transverse leaf springs and ‘Hartford’ type shock absorbers fitted length wise along the chassis.

The chassis frame and alloy bodies for the four cylinder cars in the 1920s were designed by Clemons and then built by Dreyer of Indianapolis. According to Dreyer records, six bodies were ordered, but all may not have been completed.

Clemons opened and managed the Rushville Motor Speedway in August, 1925. That year the Clemons car won nine of ten races entered, including the Hoosier motor speedway race. It also averaged 82 mph on the Fort Miami track in Toledo.

Available Indianapolis Records show that both four and eight cylinder Clemons cars were entered, including cars in 1927 and 1930 entered as ‘Hoosier Pete’ specials. In 1931, the cars used the Clemons independent rear suspension One of these, entered as ‘The Wonderbread Special’, also had a Clemons engine. This car has survived and has been restored.

A group of Indianapolis businessmen in the early 1930s commissioned Clemons and August Duesenburg to build a single seater eight cylinder Clemons powered car for the Indianapolis 500. That car was bought in 1933 by Count Trossi, the president of Scuderia Ferrari, who drove the car in the Monza Grand Prix of 1933. Whitney Straight also ran it at Brooklands, lapping at 138.34 mph, with two Winfield carburetors and a three-speed gearbox. Jack Duller later bought it and raced it at Brooklands. Paul Emery later used the engine in his Emeryson single seater race car. The car and engine were later re-united and are now at the Brooklands museum in the U.K.

== Later life ==
Clemons spent the last eight years of his life in Indianapolis running a restaurant called ‘Grandmothers Kitchen’. He died at the family home in Indianapolis, after suffering a heart attack, aged 55 on February 10, 1945.

== Patents held by Fred Clemons at the United States patent office ==
	Registration Date.	Reg No.	Title
1	11 August 1934	1142	Independent wheel suspension.
2	11 August 1934	2104736	Independent wheel suspension.
3	19 August 1921	1463574	Vehicle suspension.
4	10 January 1938	2216907	Independent wheel suspension.
5	10 January 1927	1839832	Internal combustion engine.
6	15 June 1931	2062778	Independent wheel suspension.
