= Johnny Rae (motorsport) =

American auto racing mechanic

- Born: November 21, 1907; Lafayette, Indiana, U.S.
- Died: October 20, 1960 (aged 52); Indianapolis, Indiana, U.S.
- Occupations: Auto racing mechanic Auto racing builder

Johnny Rae (November 21, 1907 – October 20, 1960) was an American auto racing mechanic and race car builder.

== Motorsports career ==
After an early career as a racing driver, including an attempt to qualify for the 1935 Indianapolis 500, Rae worked as a riding and general mechanic for Championship car teams. In 1946, he served as a mechanic on George Robson's winning car in the Indianapolis 500.

Later, Rae constructed a car owned by Alden Sampson II, with Walt Ader qualifying the machine 29th for the 1950 Indianapolis 500. Rae and Sampson campaigned the machine through the 1952 AAA Champsionship car season.

== Select Indianapolis 500 results ==
Season	Driver	Grid	Classification	Points	Note	Race Report
1950	Walt Ader	29	22			Report
