= Clay Weatherly =

American racing driver (1910–1935)

- Born: Clay F. Weatherly; May 28, 1910 Harmon, Illinois, U.S.
- Died: May 30, 1935 (aged 25) Speedway, Indiana, U.S.

Champ Car career
- 1 race run over 1 year
- First race: 1935 Indianapolis 500 (Indianapolis)
Wins	Podiums	Poles
0	0	0

Clay F. Weatherly (May 28, 1910 – May 30, 1935) was an American racing driver.

== Life and racing career ==
Born in Illinois, Weatherly lived most of his life in Wisconsin. He played fullback for Janesville High School. He began racing locally in 1932.

== Death ==
Weatherly was killed in Speedway, Indiana, during the 1935 Indianapolis 500.

== Motorsports career results ==
=== Indianapolis 500 results ===
Year	Car	Start	Qual	Rank	Finish	Laps	Led	Retired
1935	45	25	115.902	10	32	9	0	Crash T4
Totals						9	0	

Starts	1
Poles	0
Front Row	0
Wins	0
Top 5	0
Top 10	0
Retired	1
