= John Boling =

American racing driver (1895–1962)

- Born: John Riley Boling; November 19, 1895 Bloomfield, Texas, U.S.
- Died: June 28, 1962 (aged 66) Tulsa, Oklahoma, U.S.

Champ Car career
- 2 races run over 2 years
- First race: 1920 Indianapolis 500 (Indianapolis)
- Last race: 1931 Indianapolis 500 (Indianapolis)
Wins	Podiums	Poles
0	0	0

John Riley Boling (November 19, 1895 – June 28, 1962) was an American racing driver.

Of direct Native American ancestry, Boling was the first Native American to race in the Indianapolis 500. Boling is buried in an unmarked grave at Oaklawn Cemetery in Tulsa, Oklahoma.

== Motorsports career results ==
=== Indianapolis 500 results ===
Year	Car	Start	Qual	Rank	Finish	Laps	Led	Retired
1920	32	14	81.850	20	11	199	0	Flagged
1931	48	24	102.860	33	36	7	0	Rod
Totals						206	0	

Starts	2
Poles	0
Front Row	0
Wins	0
Top 5	0
Top 10	0
Retired	1
