= Phil Pardee =

American racing driver (1906–1967)

- Born: Philip Sydney Lynn; January 9, 1906 Los Angeles, California, U.S.
- Died: December 27, 1967 (aged 61) Madison County, Montana, U.S.

Champ Car career
- 3 races run over 3 years
- Best finish: 29th (1930)
- First race: 1930 Altoona 200 #2 (Altoona)
- Last race: 1931 Indianapolis 500 (Indianapolis)
Wins	Podiums	Poles
0	0	0

Philip Sydney Pardee (born Philip Sydney Lynn, January 9, 1906 – December 27, 1967) was an American racing driver.

== Motorsports career results ==
=== Indianapolis 500 results ===
Year	Car	Start	Qual	Rank	Finish	Laps	Led	Retired
1929	Qualified but withdrew due to crash							
1931	32	11	107.772	19	30	60	0	Crash T3
Totals						60	0	

Starts	1
Poles	0
Front Row	0
Wins	0
Top 5	0
Top 10	0
Retired	1
