= Harris Insinger =

American racing driver (1909–1935)

- Born: Alfred Harris Insinger Jr. July 1, 1909 Blue Bell, Pennsylvania, U.S.
- Died: September 8, 1935 (aged 26) Oakland, California, U.S.

Champ Car career
- 1 race run over 2 years
- Best finish: 24th (1934)
- First race: 1935 Indianapolis 500 (Indianapolis)
Wins	Podiums	Poles
0	0	0

Alfred Harris Insinger Jr. (July 1, 1909 – September 8, 1935) was an American racing driver. He was killed in a racing accident.

== Biography ==
Insinger was born on July 1, 1909, in Blue Bell, Pennsylvania, to Alfred Harris Insinger (1877-1918) and Catherine L. Meehan. Insinger Jr. was killed in a racing accident on September 8, 1935, at Oakland Speedway in Oakland, California.

== Motorsports career results ==
=== Indianapolis 500 results ===
Year	Car	Start	Qual	Rank	Finish	Laps	Led	Retired
1935	62	31	111.729	30	14	185	0	Flagged
Totals						185	0	

Starts	1
Poles	0
Front Row	0
Wins	0
Top 5	0
Top 10	0
Retired	0
