= 1935 Indianapolis 500 =

American motor race

23rd Indianapolis 500
Indianapolis Motor Speedway

Indianapolis 500
- Sanctioning body: AAA
- Date: May 30, 1935
- Winner: Kelly Petillo
- Winning Riding Mechanic: Jimmy Dunham
- Winning Entrant: Kelly Petillo
- Winning time: 4:42:22.71
- Average speed: 106.240 mph
- Pole position: Rex Mays
- Pole speed: 120.736 mph
- Most laps led: Kelly Petillo (102)

Pre-race
- Pace car: Ford V8
- Pace car driver: Harry Mack
- Starter: Seth Klein
- Honorary referee: Amelia Earhart
- Estimated attendance: 157,000

Chronology
Previous	Next
1934	1936

The 23rd International 500-Mile Sweepstakes Race was held at the Indianapolis Motor Speedway on Thursday, May 30, 1935. Despite attempts to improve participant safety by requiring crash helmets and installing green and yellow lights around the track, the event that year would prove to be one of the worst in terms of fatalities.

Kelly Petillo won the race, accompanied by riding mechanic Jimmy Dunham. Pete DePaolo, the 1925 winner, was the team principal, becoming the first individual to win the race separately as a driver and an owner.

The race was part of the 1935 AAA Championship Car season.

== Pre-race and qualifying ==
Ten-lap (25 mile) qualifying runs were utilized.

On May 21, nine days before the race, three prospective participants lost their lives. Rookie Johnny Hannon, on just his first lap at racing speed, had his car go over the outside retaining wall and was killed from a fractured skull. Later that day, driver Hartwell "Stubby" Stubblefield also had his car go over the outside wall, and both he and his riding mechanic Leo Whitaker died from injuries they received being thrown from the vehicle. Kelly Petillo, the eventual winner, had his own difficulties getting into the field. His initial qualifying run (a record-breaking 121.687 mph) was voided when his car was ruled to have exceeded the fuel limit. Returning to the track, he had an engine blow, before finally having a qualifying run of 115.095 that placed him 22nd in the field.

Qualifying Results
Date	Driver	Lap 1 (mph)	Lap 2 (mph)	Lap 3 (mph)	Lap 4 (mph)	Lap 5 (mph)	Lap 6 (mph)	Lap 7 (mph)	Lap 8 (mph)	Lap 9 (mph)	Lap 10 (mph)	Average Speed (mph)
Sat 5/18/1935	Rex Mays	121.310	121.425	121.819	120.773	121.212	121.359	120.208	119.936	119.506	119.856	120.736

== Starting grid ==
Row	Inside		Middle		Outside	
1	33	(United States) Rex Mays	6	(United States) Al Gordon	22	(United States) Floyd Roberts R
2	36	(United States) Louis Meyer W	1	(United States) Bill Cummings W	44	(United States) Tony Gulotta
3	21	(United States) Ralph Hepburn	19	(United States) Fred Frame W	18	(United States) Chet Gardner
4	2	(United States) Mauri Rose	3	(United States) Russ Snowberger	17	(United States) Babe Stapp
5	16	(United States) Deacon Litz	37	(United States) George Connor R	8	(United States) Doc MacKenzie
6	15	(United States) Cliff Bergere	34	(United States) Chet Miller	66	(United States) Harry McQuinn
7	9	(United States) Shorty Cantlon	14	(United States) Wilbur Shaw	4	(United States) Al Miller
8	5	(United States) Kelly Petillo	7	(United States) Lou Moore	41	(United States) Frank Brisko
9	45	(United States) Clay Weatherly R	43	(United States) Ted Horn R	42	(United States) Johnny Seymour
10	27	(United States) Freddie Winnai	35	(United States) George Bailey	39	(United States) Jimmy Snyder R
11	62	(United States) Harris Insinger R	26	(United States) Louis Tomei R	46	(United States) Bob Sall R

R Indianapolis 500 rookie
W Indianapolis 500 winner

=== Alternates ===
- First alternate: Dave Evans

=== Failed to Qualify ===
- Emil Andres R (#52, #56)
- Herb Ardinger (#24)
- George Barringer (#23)
- L. L. Corum W (#49)
- Wesley Crawford (#48)
- Dusty Fahrnow (#53)
- Johnny Hannon R (#45) - Fatal accident
- Gene Haustein (#28)
- Harry Hunt R (#25)
- Herschell McKee R (#51)
- Zeke Meyer (#31)
- Duke Nalon R - Withdrew
- Floyd O'Neal R (#57)
- Roy Painter R (#51)
- Johnny Rae R (#47)
- Johnny Sawyer (#63)
- Phil Shafer (#31)
- Overton Snell R (#58)
- Stubby Stubblefield (#29) - Fatal accident
- Doc Williams R (#64)
- Robert Wilson R (#59)
- Billy Winn (#10)

== Race ==
Driver Clay Weatherly would beg Leon Duray, the owner of Hannon's crashed car, to allow him to drive it in the race. The car would prove no luckier for Weatherly, who would be killed when the car crashed through the inner guard rail coming out of turn four on lap nine. Rex Mays would lead most of the first 300 miles (480 km) before being forced out with mechanical failure. Petillo had climbed to second, and after Mays' departure led most of the remainder other than briefly following a pit stop. Petillo easily broke the record for the fastest average speed (106.240 mph) despite being slowed somewhat by rain near the end of the race. Petillo received approximately $33,000 in winnings for the race.

== Aftermath ==
The driver deaths in 1935 caused the Speedway to develop a multi-phase Rookie Test, required for first-time drivers beginning in 1936. Adjustments were also made to the configuration of the turns. Petillo would race in five more 500s, never again finishing higher than 18th. Six of the thirty-three drivers who started the race would end up having their lives ended in accidents at the Indy Speedway.

== Box score ==
Finish	Start	No	Name	Entrant	Chassis	Engine	Qual	Rank	Laps	Status
1	22	5	(United States) Kelly Petillo	Kelly Petillo	Wetteroth	Offenhauser	115.095	15	200	106.240 mph
2	20	14	(United States) Wilbur Shaw	Gil Pirrung	Shaw	Offenhauser	116.854	7	200	+40.02
3	5	1	(United States) Bill Cummings W	H. C. Henning	Miller	Miller	116.901	6	200	+3:59.77
4	3	22	(United States) Floyd Roberts R	Earl Haskell	Miller	Miller	118.671	3	200	+8:14.34
5	7	21	(United States) Ralph Hepburn (Gene Haustein Laps 74–141)	Ralph Hepburn	Miller	Miller	115.156	13	200	+8:23.02
6	19	9	(United States) Shorty Cantlon (Billy Winn Laps 67–129)	William J. Cantlon	Stevens	Miller	118.205	4	200	+14:14.36
7	9	18	(United States) Chet Gardner	Alden Sampson II	Stevens	Miller	114.556	17	200	+14:16.31
8	13	16	(United States) Deacon Litz (Johnny Sawyer Laps 43–100) (Babe Stapp Laps 101–200)	A. B. Litz	Miller	Miller	114.488	18	200	+14:55.51
9	15	8	(United States) Doc MacKenzie	Gil Pirrung	Rigling	Miller	114.294	20	200	+15:50.30
10	17	34	(United States) Chet Miller	Fred Frame	Summers	Miller	113.552	24	200	+16:12.45
11	8	19	(United States) Fred Frame W (Frank Brisko Laps 120–200)	Harry Hartz	Wetteroth	Miller	114.701	16	200	+16:19.15
12	4	36	(United States) Louis Meyer W	Louis Meyer	Stevens	Miller	117.938	5	200	+16:51.43
13	16	15	(United States) Cliff Bergere	Phil Shafer	Rigling	Buick	114.162	23	196	Out of gas
14	31	62	(United States) Harris Insinger R	Mikan & Carson	Mikan-Carson	Studebaker	111.729	30	185	Flagged
15	21	4	(United States) Al Miller	H. C. Henning	Rigling	Miller	115.303	12	178	Magneto
16	26	43	(United States) Ted Horn R	Harry A. Miller	Miller-Ford	Ford	113.213	27	145	Steering
17	1	33	(United States) Rex Mays	Paul Weirick	Adams	Miller	120.736	1	123	Spring shackle
18	23	7	(United States) Lou Moore (Tony Gulotta Laps 109–116)	Lou Moore	Miller	Miller	114.180	22	116	Rod
19	14	37	(United States) George Connor R	Joe Marks	Stevens	Miller	114.321	19	112	Transmission
20	10	2	(United States) Mauri Rose (Paul Bost)	Four Wheel Drive Auto Company	Miller	Miller	116.470	9	103	Studs
21	6	44	(United States) Tony Gulotta	Leon Duray	Stevens	Miller	115.459	11	102	Magneto
22	30	39	(United States) Jimmy Snyder R	Joel Thorne	Snowberger	Studebaker	112.249	29	97	Spring
23	24	41	(United States) Frank Brisko	Kenneth Schroeder	Rigling	Studebaker	113.307	26	79	Universal joint
24	27	42	(United States) Johnny Seymour (George Barringer Laps 61–71)	Harry A. Miller	Miller-Ford	Ford	112.696	28	71	Grease leak
25	12	17	(United States) Babe Stapp	Joe Marks	Adams	Miller	116.736	8	70	Radiator
26	29	35	(United States) George Bailey	Harry A. Miller	Miller-Ford	Ford	113.432	25	65	Steering
27	11	3	(United States) Russ Snowberger	H. C. Henning	Miller	Miller	114.209	21	59	Exhaust pipe
28	32	26	(United States) Louis Tomei R	Joe Lencki	Miller	Lencki	110.794	32	47	Valve
29	33	46	(United States) Bob Sall R	Harry A. Miller	Miller-Ford	Ford	110.519	33	47	Steering
30	2	6	(United States) Al Gordon	William S. White	Weil	Miller	119.481	2	17	Crash T4
31	28	27	(United States) Freddie Winnai	Harry Hartz	Duesenberg	Miller	115.138	14	16	Rod
32	25	45	(United States) Clay Weatherly R ✝	Leon Duray	Stevens	Miller	115.902	10	9	Fatal accident at T4
33	18	66	(United States) Harry McQuinn	Michael DeBaets	Rigling	Miller	111.111	31	4	Rod

Note: Relief drivers in parentheses

W Former Indianapolis 500 winner

R Indianapolis 500 Rookie

=== Race statistics ===
Lap Leaders
Laps	Leader
1–63	Rex Mays
64–67	Babe Stapp
68–73	Kelly Petillo
74–99	Rex Mays
100–139	Kelly Petillo
140–144	Wilbur Shaw
145–200	Kelly Petillo

Total laps led
Driver	Laps
Kelly Petillo	102
Rex Mays	89
Wilbur Shaw	5
Babe Stapp	4

Yellow Lights
Laps*	Reason
177–189	Rain
* – Approximate lap counts

== Race details ==
For 1935, riding mechanics were required.

1934 Indianapolis 500; Bill Cummings	1935 Indianapolis 500; Kelly Petillo	1936 Indianapolis 500; Louis Meyer
Preceded by 104.863 mph (1934 Indianapolis 500)	Record for the fastest average speed 106.240 mph	Succeeded by 109.069 mph (1936 Indianapolis 500)
