= Harry Butcher (racing driver) =

American racing driver (1895–1942)

- Born: Harry Hugh Butcher; March 21, 1895 Wilmington, Illinois, U.S.
- Died: June 18, 1942 (aged 47) Wilmington, Illinois, U.S.

Champ Car career
- 2 races run over 2 years
- First race: 1930 Indianapolis 500 (Indianapolis)
- Last race: 1931 Indianapolis 500 (Indianapolis)
Wins	Podiums	Poles
0	0	0

Harry Hugh Butcher (March 21, 1895 – June 18, 1942) was an American racing driver originally from Wilmington, Illinois.

== Motorsports career results ==
=== Indianapolis 500 results ===
Year	Car	Start	Qual	Rank	Finish	Laps	Led	Retired
1930	46	38	87.003	38	14	127	0	Flagged
1931	49	33	99.343	39	38	6	0	Crash T4
Totals						133	0	

Starts	2
Poles	0
Front Row	0
Wins	0
Top 5	0
Top 10	0
Retired	1
