= Speed Gardner =

American racing driver (1895–1972)

- Born: William H. Gardner; July 2, 1895 Pittsburgh, Pennsylvania, U.S.
- Died: April 25, 1972 (aged 76) Bayonet Point, Florida, U.S.

Champ Car career
- 8 races run over 6 years
- Best finish: 15th (1930)
- First race: 1929 Indianapolis 500 (Indianapolis)
- Last race: 1931 25-mile Heat (Altoona)
Wins	Podiums	Poles
0	0	0

William H. "Speed" Gardner (July 2, 1895 – April 25, 1972) was an American racing driver during the AAA era. His best result was the first Indianapolis 500 race he managed to qualify for, finishing sixth in 1929 with the help of his relief driver Chet Gardner, completing the event at an average speed of 88.4 mph in his Miller powered Chromolite car. After two successive mechanical failures in 1930 and 1931, he looked ready to qualify for the 1932 Indianapolis 500, but failed to do so. While attempting to qualify for the 1933 race he crashed and sustained a fracture to his left thigh along with severe bruises.

== Motorsports career results ==
=== Indianapolis 500 results ===
Year	Car	Start	Qual	Rank	Finish	Laps	Led	Retired
1929	48	28	105.985	27	6	200	0	Running
1930	19	27	95.585	25	35	14	0	Main bearing
1931	17	7	109.820	13	25	107	0	Frame
Totals						321	0	

Starts	3
Poles	0
Front Row	0
Wins	0
Top 5	0
Top 10	1
Retired	2
