= 1931 AAA Championship Car season =

Auto racing season

- AAA National Championship Trail

Season
- Races: 7
- Start date: May 30
- End date: September 12

Awards
- National champion: (United States) Louis Schneider
- Indianapolis 500 winner: (United States) Louis Schneider

The 1931 AAA Championship Car season consisted of seven races, beginning in Speedway, Indiana on May 30 and concluding in Syracuse, New York on September 12. There was one non-championship race. The AAA National Champion and Indianapolis 500 winner was Louis Schneider.

Joe Caccia and his driving mechanic Clarence Grover died at Indianapolis during practice. Jimmy Gleason died at Syracuse during practice.

== Schedule and results ==
All races running on Dirt/Brick/Board Oval.

Rnd	Date	Race name	Track	Location	Type	Pole position	Winning driver
1	May 30	(United States) International 500 Mile Sweepstakes	Indianapolis Motor Speedway	Speedway, Indiana	Brick	(United States) Russ Snowberger	(United States) Louis Schneider
2	June 14	(United States) Detroit Race - 100	Michigan State Fairgrounds	Detroit, Michigan	Dirt	(United States) Ernie Triplett	(United States) Louis Meyer
NC	June 21	(United States) Roby 100	Roby Speedway	Roby, Indiana	Dirt	—	(United States) Louis Schneider
3	July 4	(United States) Altoona Race 1 - 100	Altoona Speedway	Tyrone, Pennsylvania	Board	(United States) Paul Bost	(United States) Lou Moore
4	September 7	(United States) Altoona Heat 1 - 25	Altoona Speedway	Tyrone, Pennsylvania	Board	(United States) Lou Moore	(United States) Jimmy Gleason
5	September 7	(United States) Altoona Heat 2 - 25	Altoona Speedway	Tyrone, Pennsylvania	Board	(United States) Shorty Cantlon	(United States) Shorty Cantlon
6	September 7	(United States) Altoona Race 2 - 25	Altoona Speedway	Tyrone, Pennsylvania	Board	(United States) Shorty Cantlon	(United States) Shorty Cantlon
7	September 12	(United States) Syracuse Race - 100	New York State Fairgrounds	Syracuse, New York	Dirt	(United States) Shorty Cantlon	(United States) Lou Moore

Non-championship race

== Final points standings ==
Note: Drivers had to be running at the finish to score points. Points scored by drivers sharing a ride were split according to percentage of race driven. Starters were not allowed to score points as relief drivers, if a race starter finished the race in another car, in a points scoring position, those points were awarded to the driver who had started the car.
The final standings based on reference.

Pos	Driver	INDY (United States)	DET (United States)	ALT1 (United States)	ALT2 (United States)	ALT3 (United States)	ALT4 (United States)	SYR (United States)	Pts
1	(United States) Louis Schneider	1	7		7	6	6	15	712.5
2	(United States) Fred Frame	2	9	4	15			12	540
3	(United States) Ralph Hepburn	3	4		DNS			13	362
4	(United States) Russ Snowberger	**5**	8					10	330
5	(United States) Jimmy Gleason	6	DNQ	2	1		5	DNQ	329
6	(United States) Shorty Cantlon	27	12	6	3	**1**	**1**	**3**	296
7	(United States) Ernie Triplett	7	**2***					DNQ	290
8	(United States) Lou Moore	26		1*	**13**			1	240
9	(United States) Chet Miller	10	10	13	6	5	3	5	216.5
10	(United States) Bill Cummings	28	3		8	7	2*	3	191.5
11	(United States) Sam Ross	15	5		16	11	8	2	180
12	(United States) Stubby Stubblefield	8							150
13	(United States) Wilbur Shaw	6	11	3	14			11	145
14	(United States) Myron Stevens	4							127.7
15	(United States) Louis Meyer	34	1						120
16	(United States) Paul Bost	31	DNQ	**7**	4	3	5	14	113.5
17	(United States) Milton Jones	DNQ		8	11	8	4	DNQ	107.5
18	(United States) Cliff Bergere	9							100
19	(United States) Al Aspen RY	14		9	12	9	9	7	85
20	(United States) Gene Haustein	23	14	10	DNP			4	80
21	(United States) Deacon Litz	17			5	4	7	16	72.5
22	(United States) Tony Gulotta	18	DNQ	5					60
23	(United States) Herman Schurch	39						6	50
24	(United States) Francis Quinn R	40	6						50
25	(United States) Zeke Meyer	DNQ	DNQ		2	2	11	DNQ	45
26	(United States) Bill Denver	11		DNS	10	10	10	9	35
27	(United States) Doc MacKenzie R							8	30
28	(United States) Bryan Saulpaugh R	21			DNP			DNQ	11.3
29	(United States) William Gardner	25			9				5
-	(United States) Joe Huff	16		11					0
-	(United States) George Howie R	11						DNQ	0
-	(United States) L. L. Corum	11							0
-	(United States) Malcolm Fox R	DNQ		12					0
-	(United States) Phil Shafer	12							0
-	(United States) Babe Stapp	35	13						0
-	(United States) Dave Evans	13							0
-	(United States) George Wingerter R	33		14				DNQ	0
-	(United States) Billy Arnold	19*							0
-	(United States) Luther Johnson	20	DNQ						0
-	(United States) Billy Winn R	21							0
-	(United States) James Patterson R	21							0
-	(United States) Frank Brisko	22							0
-	(United States) Joe Russo R	24							0
-	(United States) Wesley Crawford	25							0
-	(United States) Freddie Winnai	29							0
-	(United States) Phil Pardee	30							0
-	(United States) Frank Farmer	32	DNQ					DNQ	0
-	(United States) John Boling	36							0
-	(United States) Leon Duray	37							0
-	(United States) Harry Butcher	38							0
-	(United States) Ab Jenkins	DNS							0
-	(United States) Sun Hawk							DNS	0
-	(United States) Milt Marion	DNQ						DNQ	0
-	(United States) Rollin May	DNQ						DNQ	0
-	(United States) Ben Brandfon	DNQ							0
-	(United States) Eddie Burbach	DNQ							0
-	(United States) Joe Caccia	DNQ							0
-	(United States) Ted Chamberlain	DNQ							0
-	(United States) Gordon Condon	DNQ							0
-	(United States) Rick Decker	DNQ							0
-	(United States) Ralph DePalma	DNQ							0
-	(United States) Peter DePaolo	DNQ							0
-	(United States) Dusty Fahrnow	DNQ							0
-	(United States) Jerry Houck	DNQ							0
-	(United States) Bert Karnatz	DNQ							0
-	(United States) Pete Kreis	DNQ							0
-	(United States) Norske Larson	DNQ							0
-	(United States) Charles Moran	DNQ							0
-	(United States) Roy Painter	DNQ							0
-	(United States) C. C. Reeder	DNQ							0
-	(United States) Johnny Seymour	DNQ							0
-	(United States) Carl Smith	DNQ							0
-	(United States) Floyd Sparks	DNQ							0
-	(United States) Joe Thomas	DNQ							0
-	(United States) Marion Trexler	DNQ							0
-	(United States) Wally Zale	DNQ							0
-	(United States) R. G. Brown							DNQ	0
-	(United States) Gene Pirong							DNQ	0
-	(United States) George Simons							DNQ	0
Pos	Driver	INDY (United States)	DET (United States)	ALT1 (United States)	ALT2 (United States)	ALT3 (United States)	ALT4 (United States)	SYR (United States)	Pts

Color	Result
Gold	Winner
Silver	2nd place
Bronze	3rd place
Green	4th & 5th place
Light Blue	6th-10th place
Dark Blue	Finished (Outside Top 10)
Purple	Did not finish (Ret)
Red	Did not qualify (DNQ)
Brown	Withdrawn (Wth)
Black	Disqualified (DSQ)
White	Did not start (DNS)
Blank	Did not participate (DNP)
Blank	Not competing

**In-line notation**
**Bold**	Pole position
Italics	Ran fastest race lap
*	Led most race laps
Rookie of the Year
Rookie

== See also ==
- 1931 Indianapolis 500
