= Herman Schurch =

American racing driver (1903–1931)

- Born: Hermann Werner Schurch; April 7, 1903 Sumiswald, Bern, Switzerland
- Died: November 8, 1931 (aged 28) Alhambra, California, U.S.

Champ Car career
- 5 races run over 4 years
- Best finish: 10th (1930)
- First race: 1929 Indianapolis 500 (Indianapolis)
- Last race: 1931 Syracuse 100 (Syracuse)
Wins	Podiums	Poles
0	0	0

Herman Werner Schurch (born Hermann Werner Schurch, April 7, 1903 – November 8, 1931) was an American racing driver.

== Biography ==
Schurch's family emigrated to the United States when he was a boy. He made five starts in AAA Championship Car from 1929 to 1931. He had failed to qualify for the 1928 Indianapolis 500 but made the race in 1929. He served as a relief driver for Shorty Cantlon in the 1930 race. He also drove in the 1931 Indianapolis 500 but his transmission failed after 5 laps. His best finish in AAA Championship racing came later that year at the New York State Fairgrounds Raceway where he finished sixth. Schurch excelled in Big Car racing (Sprint Car), where he won many races on the Eastern circuit (in the Northeast United States). He was killed in practice for a dirt track race at Legion Ascot Speedway in California. Schurch was elected to the National Sprint Car Hall of Fame in 2010.

== Motorsports career results ==
=== Indianapolis 500 results ===
Year	Car	Start	Qual	Rank	Finish	Laps	Led	Retired
1929	31	27	107.477	25	20	70	0	Gas tank split
1931	10	39	102.845	34	39	5	0	Transmission
Totals						75	0	

Starts	2
Poles	0
Front Row	0
Wins	0
Top 5	0
Top 10	0
Retired	2
