= George Wingerter =

American racing driver (1904–1994)

- Born: George Harold Wingerter; September 4, 1904 Brooklyn, New York, U.S.
- Died: August 20, 1994 (aged 89) Denison, Texas, U.S.

Champ Car career
- 3 races run over 6 years
- First race: 1931 Indianapolis 500 (Indianapolis)
- Last race: 1935 Langhorne 100 (Langhorne)
Wins	Podiums	Poles
0	0	0

George Wingerter (September 4, 1904 – August 20, 1994) was an American racing driver.

== Motorsports career results ==
=== Indianapolis 500 results ===
Year	Car	Start	Qual	Rank	Finish	Laps	Led	Retired
1931	58	32	100.139	38	33	29	0	Fuel tank
Totals						29	0	

Starts	1
Poles	0
Front Row	0
Wins	0
Top 5	0
Top 10	0
Retired	1
