= Francis Quinn (racing driver) =

American racing driver (1903–1931)

- Born: Francis Lafayette Quinn; March 22, 1903 Washougal, Washington, U.S.
- Died: December 13, 1931 (aged 28) near Fresno, California, U.S.

Championship titles
- AAA West Coast Big Car (1930)

Champ Car career
- 2 races run over 1 year
- Best finish: 23rd (tie) (1931)
- First race: 1931 Indianapolis 500 (Indianapolis)
- Last race: 1931 Detroit 100 (Detroit)
Wins	Podiums	Poles
0	0	0

Francis Lafayette Quinn (March 22, 1903 – December 13, 1931) was an American racing driver.

== Racing career ==
Quinn was a prominent figure in racing on America's west coast, including winning the American Automobile Association's Pacific Southwest championship in 1930. Quinn attempted entry into the Indianapolis 500 multiple times, but was denied due to an abnormally large heart. He was finally allowed entry in 1931 after his Pacific Southwest championship win the year prior.

== Death ==
Quinn died December 13, 1931, in a traffic collision five miles north of Fresno, California. While driving his passenger car back from a rained-out event scheduled at Oakland Speedway, Quinn's southbound car was struck by an oncoming car. Quinn died at the roadside, while his passenger, Claude French, escaped with only minor injuries. Manslaughter charges were filed against the driver of the other car, but he was acquitted in court.

== Awards and honors ==
Quinn was inducted into the National Sprint Car Hall of Fame in 2006.

== Motorsports career results ==
=== Indianapolis 500 results ===
Year	Car	Start	Qual	Rank	Finish	Laps	Led	Retired
1931	67	21	111.321	9	40	3	0	Rear axle

Starts	1
Poles	0
Front Row	0
Wins	0
Top 5	0
Top 10	0
Retired	1
