= Kelly Petillo =

American racing driver (1903–1970)

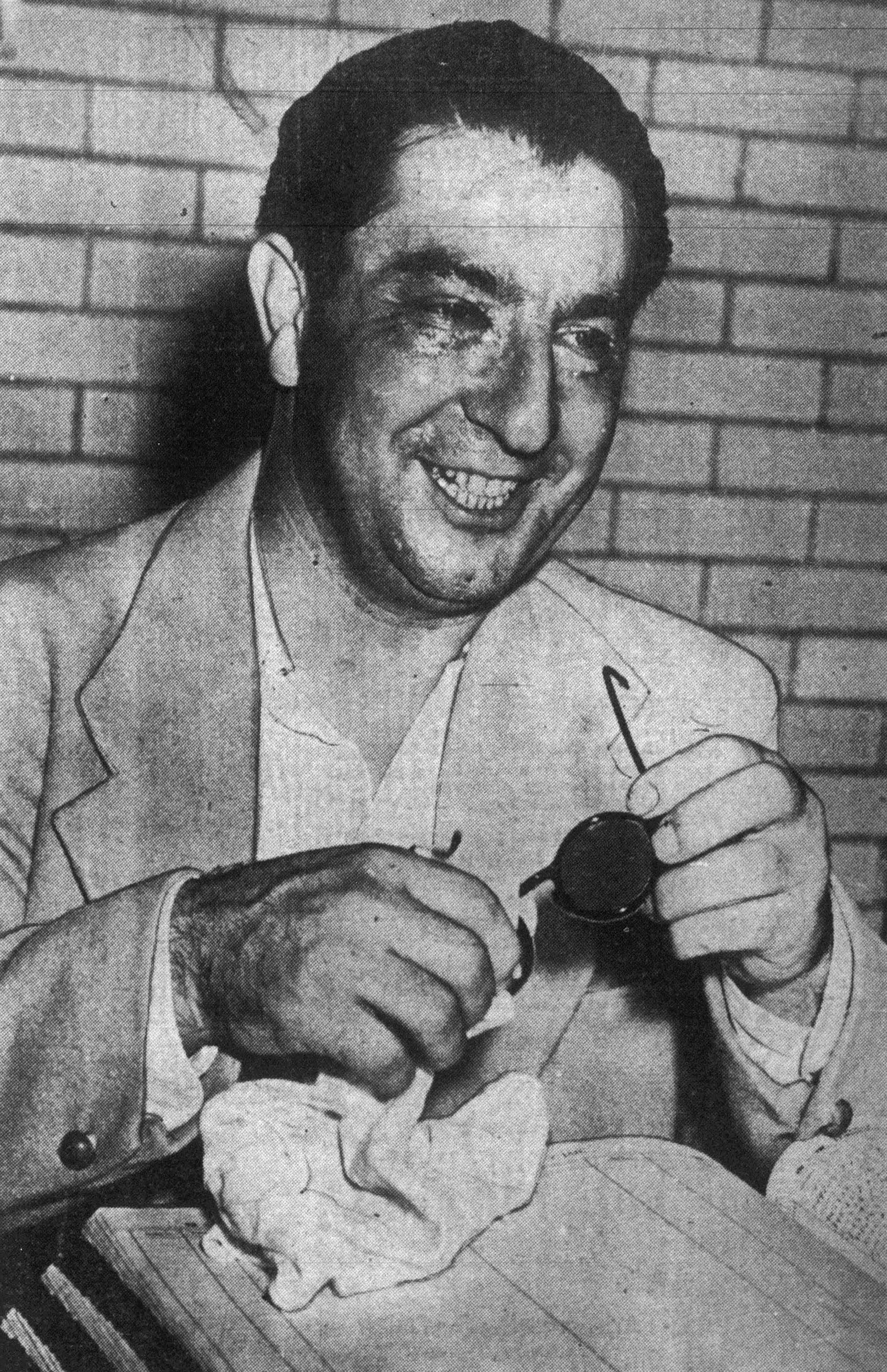
- Petillo, circa 1941
- Born: Cavino Michelle Petillo; December 5, 1903 Pittsburgh, Pennsylvania, U.S.
- Died: June 30, 1970 (aged 66) Los Angeles, California, U.S.

Championship titles
- AAA Championship Car (1935); Major victories Indianapolis 500 (1935)

Champ Car career
- 21 races run over 11 years
- Best finish: 1st (1935)
- First race: 1932 Indianapolis 500 (Indianapolis)
- Last race: 1941 Indianapolis 500 (Indianapolis)
- First win: 1934 Mines Field Race (Mines Field)
- Last win: 1935 Langhorne 100 (Langhorne)
Wins	Podiums	Poles
4	4	2

Kelly Carl Petillo (born Cavino Michelle Petillo, December 5, 1903 or December 16, 1903 – June 30, 1970) was an American racing driver.

== Early life ==
Born in Pittsburgh, Pennsylvania in 1903, Petillo moved with his family to Huntington Park, California in 1921. He began racing at Los Angeles' Legion Ascot Speedway in 1929.

== Driving career ==
Petillo competed in the Indianapolis 500 on ten occasions, winning the race in 1935 in a year that marked the first win by a car powered by an Offenhauser engine. He went on to win the 1935 AAA-sanctioned National Driving Championship. In 1937, he participated in the Vanderbilt Cup but engine problems forced him out of the race.

In 1942, Petillo sustained a concussion and lacerations after a road accident when his car collided with a freight train. He was denied entry to the 1946 Indianapolis 500, and sued the Indianapolis Motor Speedway for $50,000.

== Legal issues and enforced retirement ==
Off the track, Petillo had numerous run-ins with the law, including charges of attempted rape and attempted murder. In 1948, police arrested him in victory lane after winning a race at Owosso Speedway, on charges of assault to commit murder seven days earlier. This was assault and battery. He was sentenced to ten years in the Indiana State Prison. He was released on parole in 1955, but went missing. He was re-captured in 1957, incidentally, at the Indianapolis Motor Speedway. He was returned to prison until 1959, after which he was denied entry to the Indianapolis 500 in 1959 and 1960, officially due to age. After his exclusion in 1959, he again filed a lawsuit for $50,000 against the speedway and the United States Auto Club.

Petillo had a small role in the 1939 motion picture Burn 'Em Up O'Connor.

== Death ==
Petillo and his wife, Valentine, who filed for divorce in 1943, had a son, Kelly Jr.

Petillo died of emphysema in Los Angeles in 1970, aged 66. He is buried in Pacific Crest Cemetery in Redondo Beach, California.

== Awards and honors ==
Petillo has been inducted into the following halls of fame:

- National Sprint Car Hall of Fame (2009)

== Motorsports career results ==
=== Indianapolis 500 results ===
Year	Car	Start	Qual	Rank	Finish	Laps	Led	Retired
1932	36	40	104.645	40	12	189	0	Flagged
1933	27	25	113.037	18	19	168	0	Spun & stalled
1934	17	1	119.329	1	11	200	6	Running
1935	5	22	115.095	15	1	200	102	Running
1937	25	20	124.129	2	20	109	0	Out of oil
1938	35	21	119.827	19	22	100	0	Camshaft
1939	35	24	123.660	16	18	141	0	Pistons
1940	35	13	125.331	5	21	128	0	Bearing
1941	22	19	124.417	7	27	48	0	Rod
Totals						1283	108	

Starts	9
Poles	1
Front Row	1
Wins	1
Top 5	1
Top 10	1
Retired	6

Preceded by Bill Cummings	Indianapolis 500 Winner; 1935	Succeeded by Louis Meyer
