= Milton Jones (racing driver) =

American racing driver (1894–1932)

- Born: Milton Jones; August 4, 1894 Plymouth, Pennsylvania, U.S.
- Died: May 27, 1932 (aged 37) Speedway, Indiana, U.S.

Champ Car career
- 4 races run over 2 years
- Best finish: 17th (1931)
- First race: 1931 Altoona 100 (Altoona)
- Last race: 1931 25-mile Race (Altoona)
Wins	Podiums	Poles
0	1	0

Milton Jones (often seen as M. C. Jones, August 4, 1894 – May 27, 1932) was an American racing driver.

== Biography ==
Jones was born in Plymouth, Pennsylvania. Jones was a motorcycle rider and toured the country in a motordrome act with his wife Molly "the Mile-a-Minute Girl"; Jones was known by the nickname "Dare Devil Jones". They had a son, Milton Jones Jr.

Jones was killed in a crash at Indianapolis, Indiana, during a practice run for the 1932 Indianapolis 500.

Jones lived in Cleveland at the time of his death. He was buried in Acacia Masonic Memorial Park in Mayfield Heights, Ohio.
