= Joe Russo (racing driver) =

American racing driver (1901–1934)

- Born: Joseph Edward Russo; December 27, 1901 Racine, Wisconsin, U.S.
- Died: June 10, 1934 (aged 32) Bristol, Pennsylvania, U.S.

Champ Car career
- 9 races run over 4 years
- Best finish: 3rd (tie) (1934)
- First race: 1931 Indianapolis 500 (Indianapolis)
- Last race: 1934 Indianapolis 500 (Indianapolis)
Wins	Podiums	Poles
0	0	0

Joseph Edward Russo (December 27, 1901 – June 10, 1934) was an American racing driver active in the 1930s.

== Life ==
Russo was known for performing a stunt of driving around the Indianapolis Motor Speedway blindfolded.

Russo died in a hospital in Bristol, Pennsylvania after a crash at Langhorne Speedway. He is buried in Detroit, Michigan at Mt. Olivet Cemetery.

Russo's son, Eddie, and his brother, Paul also competed in the Indianapolis 500.

== Motorsports career results ==
=== Indianapolis 500 results ===
Year	Car	Start	Qual	Rank	Finish	Laps	Led	Retired
1931	41	16	104.822	29	24	109	0	Oil leak
1932	41	21	108.791	35	24	107	0	Rod
1933	18	31	112.531	20	17	192	0	Flagged
1934	16	24	113.115	18	5	200	0	Running
Totals						608	0	

Starts	4
Poles	0
Front Row	0
Wins	0
Top 5	1
Top 10	1
Retired	2
