= Bob Sall =

American racing driver (1908–1974)

- Born: Robert Sall Jr. January 22, 1908 Ridgewood, New Jersey, U.S.
- Died: October 14, 1974 (aged 66) Cream Ridge, New Jersey, U.S.

Championship titles
- AAA Eastern Big Car (1933)

Champ Car career
- 4 races run over 4 years
- Best finish: 21st (1937)
- First race: 1934 Mines Field Race (Mines Field)
- Last race: 1937 Syracuse 100 (Syracuse)
Wins	Podiums	Poles
0	1	0

Robert Sall Jr. (January 22, 1908 – October 14, 1974) was an American racing driver.

== Racing career ==
Sall was the Eastern big car champion in 1933. He made four AAA Championship Car starts from 1934 through 1937, including the 1935 Indianapolis 500, in which he drove a radical front wheel drive Miller chassis powered by a Ford V8 engine. Sall was primarily a big car racer, and he later became NASCAR's Eastern field manager.

== Awards and honors ==
Sall was inducted in the National Sprint Car Hall of Fame in 1992.

== Motorsports career results ==
=== Indianapolis 500 results ===
Year	Car	Start	Qual	Rank	Finish	Laps	Led	Retired
1935	46	33	110.519	33	29	47	0	Steering
Totals						47	0	

Starts	1
Poles	0
Front Row	0
Wins	0
Top 5	0
Top 10	0
Retired	1
