= Johnny Hannon =

American racing driver (1909–1935)

- Born: John C. Hrankaj; November 9, 1909 Upper Darby, Pennsylvania, U.S.
- Died: May 21, 1935 (aged 25) Speedway, Indiana, U.S.

Championship titles
- AAA Eastern Big Car (1934)

John C. Hrankaj, publicly known as Johnny Hannon (November 9, 1909 – May 21, 1935) was an American racing driver and boxer. He was killed in Speedway, Indiana, while testing a car for the 1935 Indianapolis 500 – his first year of attempting to qualify for the race. He had previously been successful on the dirt track circuit.

== Racing career ==
In 1934, Hannon was the AAA Eastern Circuit dirt track racing champion. Among his victories was the first auto race ever held at the Stafford, Conn. Fairgrounds, now Stafford Motor Speedway. Hannon piloted Gus Strupp's Big Car to win the American Automobile Association sanctioned race on October 14, 1934.

In 1935, Hannon was to attempt to qualify for the Indianapolis 500, but lost control of his car in practice and went over the Northwest wall. The crash occurred on his first lap at racing speed. He was thrown from the vehicle, which then landed on top of him, causing his immediate death. After a series of deaths in the 1935 race, Indianapolis Motor Speedway officials began what is now known as the Rookie Orientation Program (ROP) for first-year Indianapolis 500 drivers, and a related Refresher Test for drivers who have not raced in an Indy car oval race in the past eleven months.

Hannno was inducted into the National Sprint Car Hall of Fame in 2006.

== Personal life ==
Hannon was born in the United States but grew up in Germany. Before racing he was a professional boxer, winning 13 of 14 bouts. At the time of his death, he was married with two children and living in Conshohocken, Pennsylvania.
