= Louis Schneider =

American racing driver (1901–1942)

- Born: December 19, 1901 Indianapolis, Indiana, U.S.
- Died: September 22, 1942 (aged 40) Indianapolis, Indiana, U.S.

Championship titles
- AAA Championship Car (1931); Major victories Indianapolis 500 (1931)

Champ Car career
- 17 races run over 7 years
- Best finish: 1st (1931)
- First race: 1927 Indianapolis 500 (Indianapolis)
- Last race: 1933 Indianapolis 500 (Indianapolis)
- First win: 1931 Indianapolis 500 (Indianapolis)
Wins	Podiums	Poles
1	2	0

Louis Frank Schneider (December 19, 1901 – September 22, 1942) was an American racing driver. He won the 1931 Indianapolis 500.

== Biography ==
Schneider was born in Indianapolis on December 19, 1901. He graduated from School No. 49, and later attended Shortridge High School, Ohio Military Institute, and Culver Military Academy.

Schneider started racing on dirt tracks in the East and Midwest in 1920. He was an Indianapolis motorcycle policeman in the mid-20s, and later participated in many motorcycle races. In the fall of 1926, he entered AAA-sanctioned competition driving a car owned by racing enthusiast Mike Boyle.

In 1928, Schneider entered the Indianapolis 500, having rebuilt a Miller-engined car to meet the 91.5-cubic-inch (1.5 L) piston displacement limit, and qualified at 114.036 miles per hour (183.523 km/h), the fastest average speed made with a rebuilt engine up to that time.

In 1930, Schneider drove the "Bowes Seal Fast Special" eight cylinder front-drive and, after qualifying at 106.107 miles per hour (170.763 km/h), finished the race in third position. (This was the race in which Billy Arnold took the lead after lap 2 and led the entire remaining 198 laps to win the race, setting an all-time record.)

The following year, 1931, Schneider achieved the greatest success of his racing career when he won the 19th running of the Indianapolis 500 as well as that year's AAA national championship. He is one of only two drivers to win the Indianapolis 500 who were born in Indianapolis (the other was Bill Cummings).

Schneider's last race at Indianapolis was in 1933, but he continued to compete in dirt track and midget car racing. In 1934, he was accompanied by Clay Ballinger of Indianapolis and Buddy Rusch and James Triplett of Chicago on a two-month racing trip to Buenos Aires, Argentina.

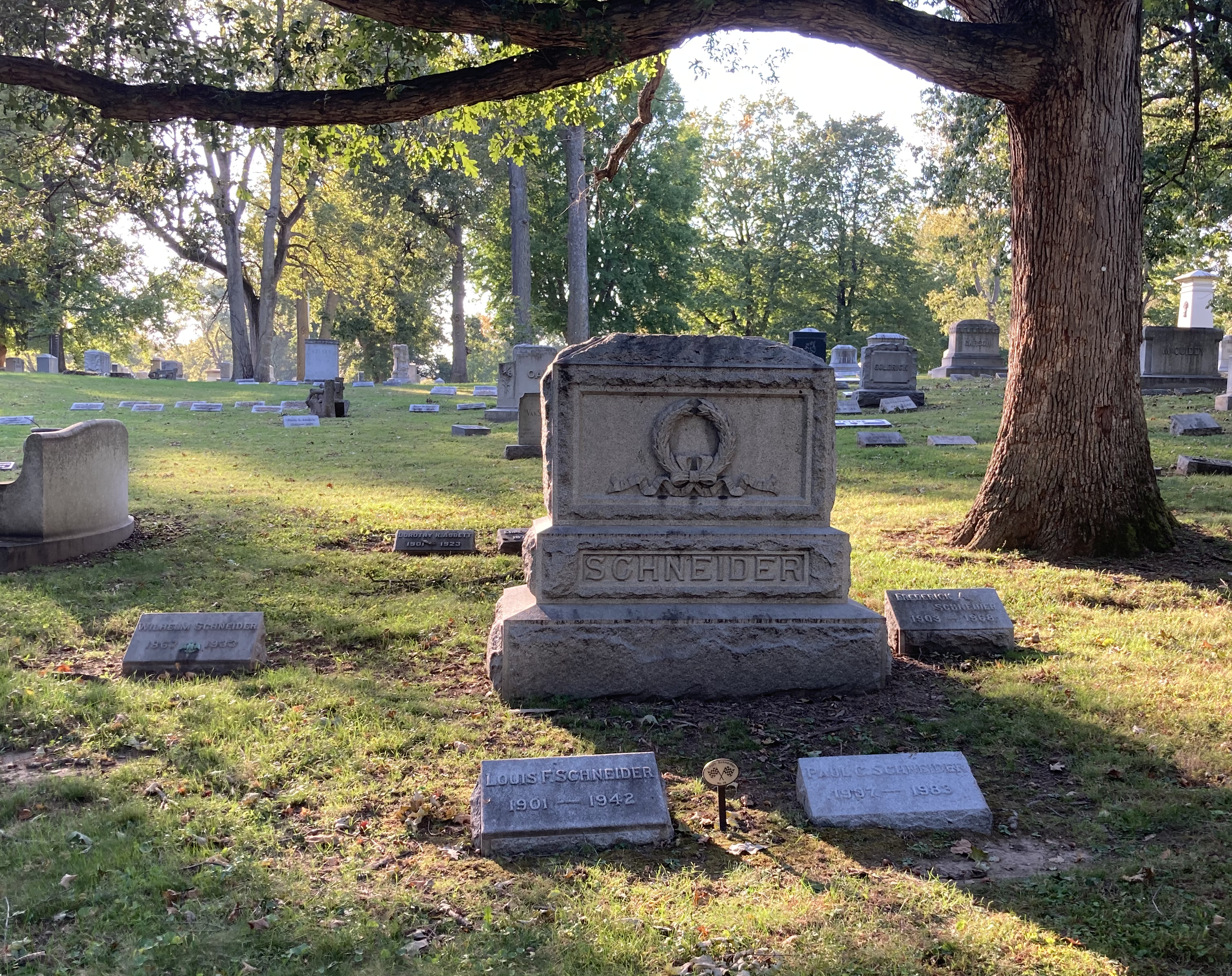
Schneider's grave at Crown Hill Cemetery

During the 1937, Schneider was involved in an incident with that year's winner Wilbur Shaw. During Shaw's post-race celebration (his first of three wins), Schneider appeared on the other side of the fence, and, in Shaw's words, "made some sneering remark about me being a lucky so-and-so, and his smart crack touched me off like a skyrocket. I went over the fence like a monkey, landed on the other side, and hit Louis right on the nose faster than I can tell about it."

Schneider suffered a broken arm and facial bruises in a nasty midget crash while qualifying for a program at City Stadium in San Diego on April 3, 1938. Newspaper articles from later in the year reported his return to racing, though it isn't known for certain that he took part in those racing programs. He died of tuberculosis on September 22, 1942, at age 40, after a three-month stay at the Indianapolis Flower Mission Hospital. Owing to an erroneous wire report at the time of his death, the cause of his death has been widely misreported as being from racing injuries, but tuberculosis is the sole cause of death listed on his Indiana death certificate.

Schneider is buried at Crown Hill Cemetery in Indianapolis. Section 42, Lot 142, Lat: 39.8212702, Long: -86.16569

== Motorsports career results ==
=== Indianapolis 500 results ===
Year	Car	Start	Qual	Rank	Finish	Laps	Led	Retired
1927	43	23	109.910	15	16	137	0	Timing gears
1928	24	7	114.036	7	11	200	0	Running
1930	23	4	106.107	6	3rd	200	0	Running
1931	23	13	107.210	22	1st	200	39	Running
1932	1	30	110.681	26	23	125	0	Frame
1933	22	21	109.850	34	42	1	0	Stalled
Totals						863	39	

Starts	6
Poles	0
Front Row	0
Wins	1
Top 5	2
Top 10	2
Retired	3

Preceded by Billy Arnold	Indianapolis 500 Winner; 1931	Succeeded by Fred Frame
