= Sampson (automobile) =

Defunct American motor vehicle manufacturer

Alden Sampson Manufacturing Company
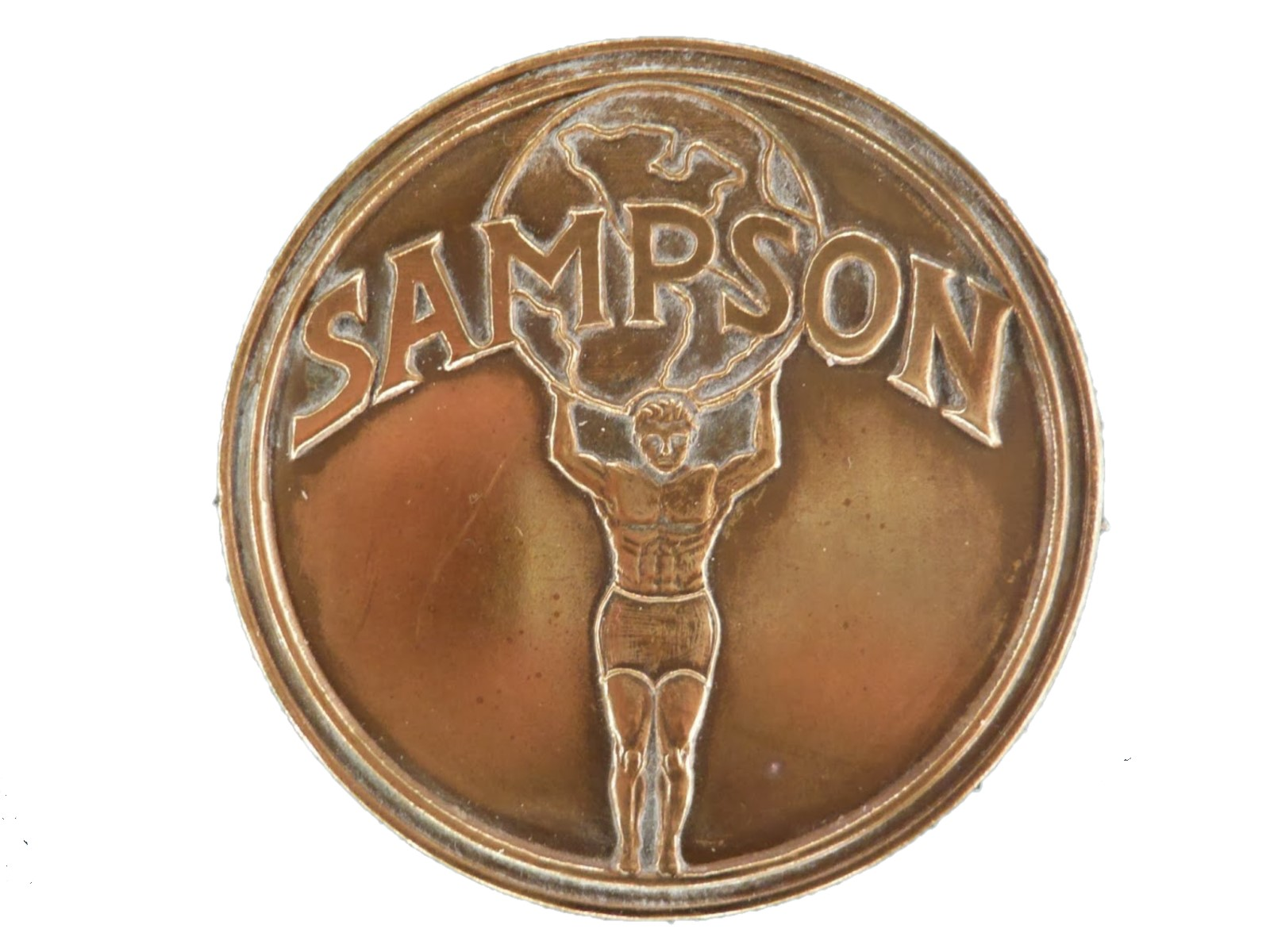
- Formerly: Alden Sampson Machine Company
- Industry: Automotive
- Founded: 1904; 122 years ago
- Founder: Alden Sampson II
- Defunct: 1912; 114 years ago
- Fate: Bankruptcy
- Headquarters: Pittsfield, Massachusetts, Detroit, Michigan, United States
- Products: Automobiles, Trucks
- Production output: unknown (1904-1912)
- Brands: Alden Sampson, Sampson

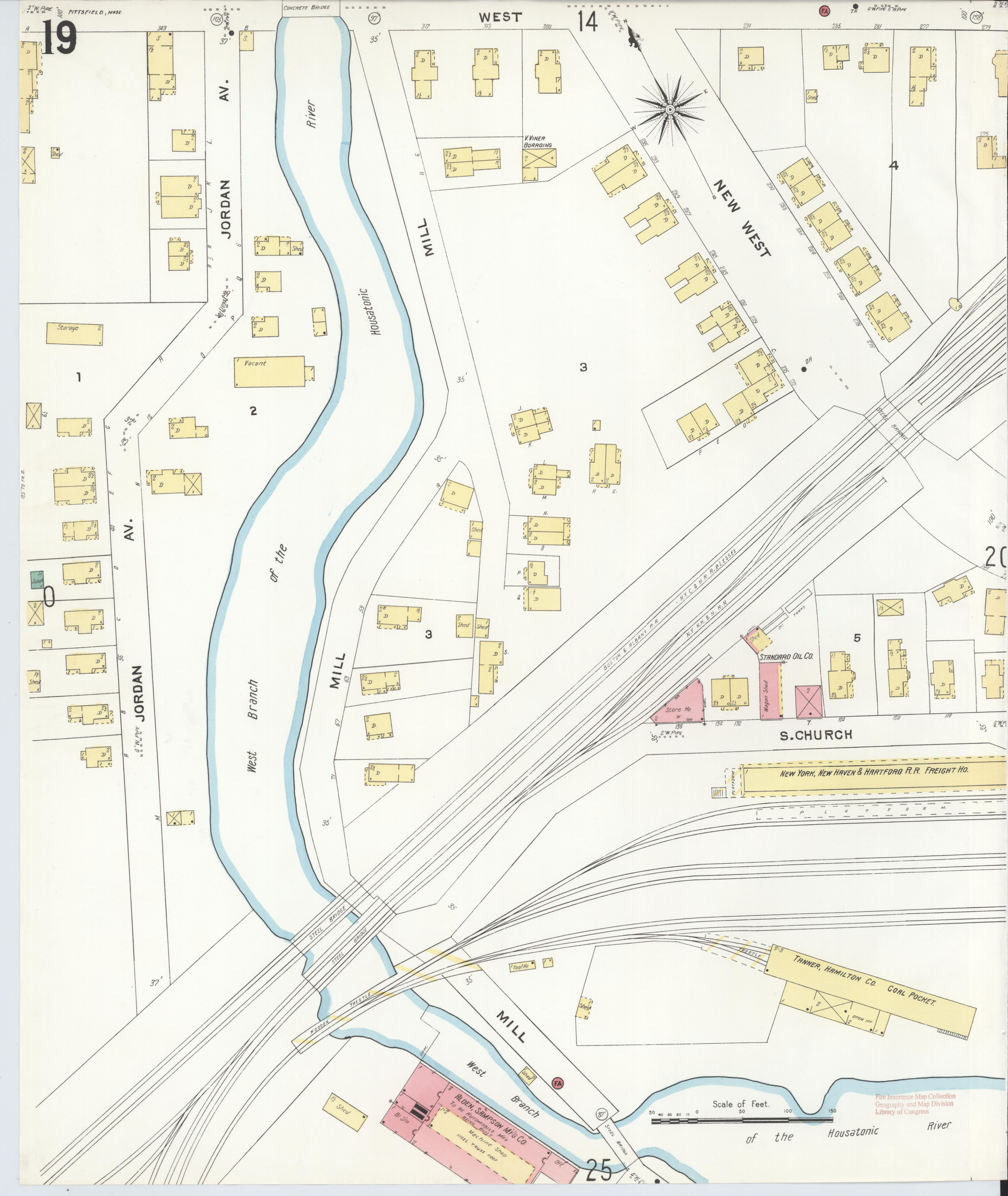
Alden Sampson plant (1905)

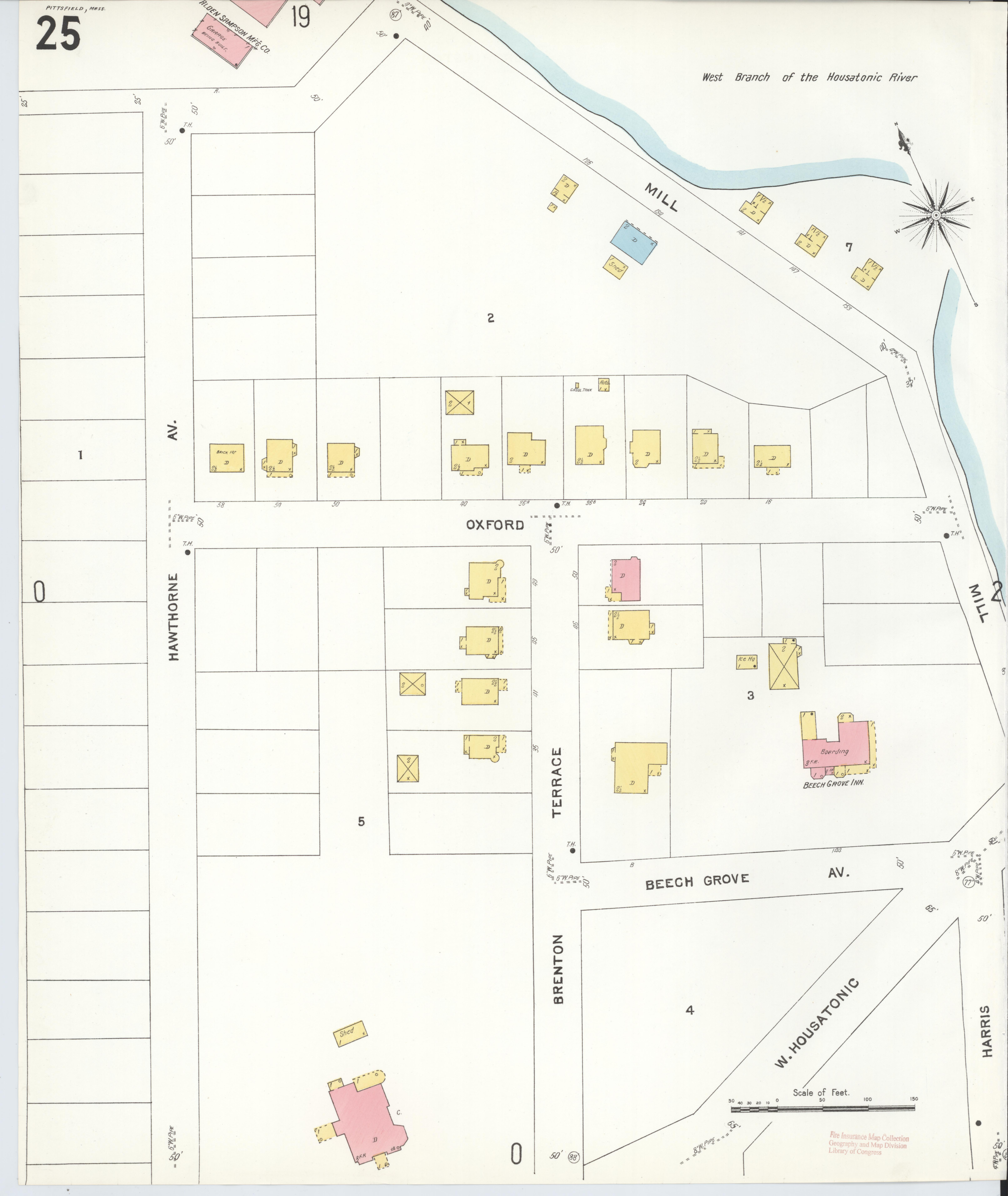
Alden Sampson plant; Connection image (1905)

The Sampson and Alden Sampson was a brass era automobile manufactured by the Alden Sampson Manufacturing Company of Pittsfield, Massachusetts in 1904. The Sampson was built again in 1911 by United States Motors, Alden Sampson Division, in Detroit, Michigan.

== History ==
The 1904 Alden Sampson also called the Sampson in some contemporary articles, had a 4-cylinder 16 Horsepower engine with a 4-speed sliding-gear transmission with two chains to drive the rear wheels. It boasted a transaxle. It was based on the 1903 Moyea automobile for which the Alden Sampson Manufacturing Company had built the chassis. The Alden Sampson was introduced as a touring car, luxury priced at $3,750, equivalent to $134,375 in 2025. The chassis only could be purchased for $3,250 for owners to add their own choice of coachwork.

Alden Sampson purchased the bankrupt Crest Manufacturing to secure an A.L.A.M. license to manufacture motor cars. In 1905 Alden Sampson decided to build trucks instead of cars.

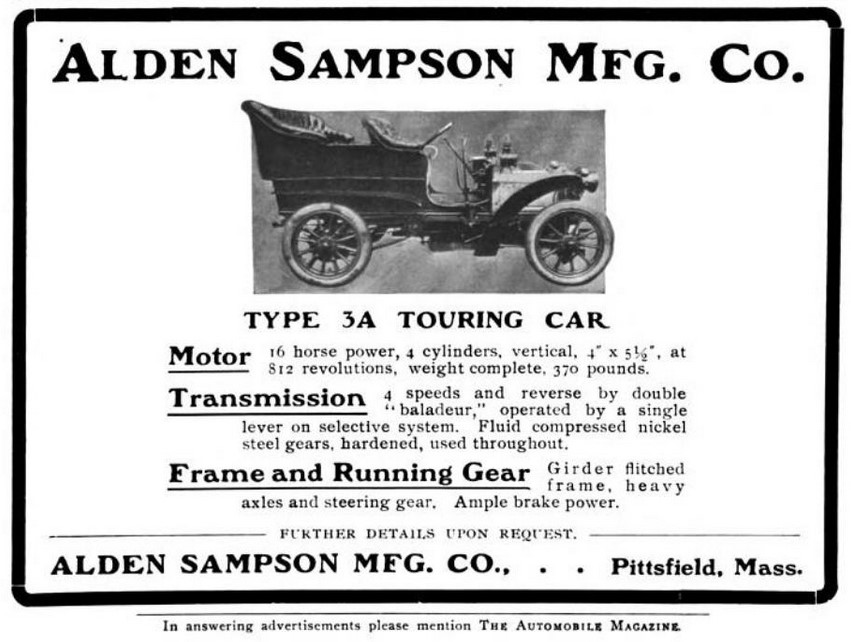
1904 Alden Sampson advertisement in The Automobile magazine

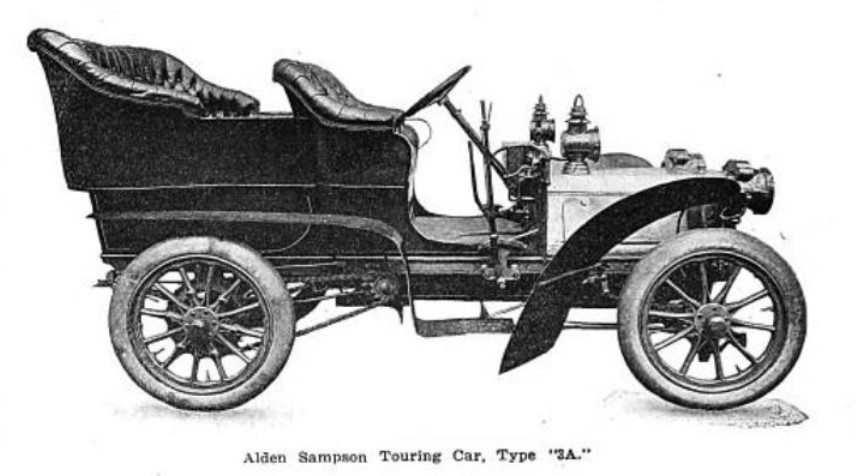
1904 Alden Sampson from an article in the Automobile Review

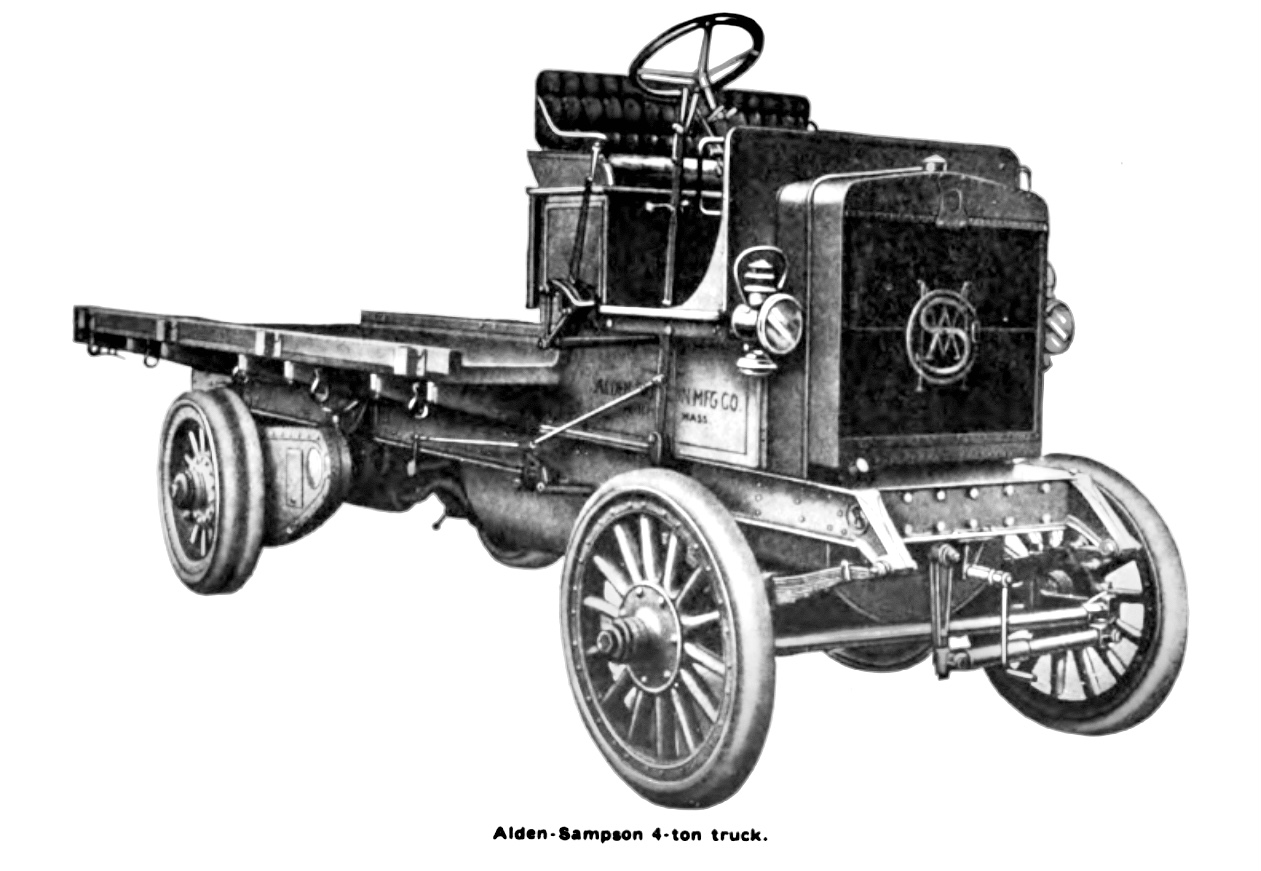
Alden-Sampson 4t (1908)

Sampson Truck (1910)

Sampson trucks became widely known. In 1909 Alden Sampson II died and his widow sold the company for a reported $200,000 (equivalent to $6,910,714 in 2025) to the United States Motor Company in 1911. A new factory was constructed in 1911 in Detroit, Michigan and U S Motors decided to add cars to the Sampson truck production.

The 1911 Sampson, called the Sampson 35, had a 4-cylinder 35 hp engine. This model was a four-door, five-seat touring car that was advertised as having 17 coats of paint. It actually had only 3 doors; the fourth was just an outline, and blocked by the gear shift and brake. Aluminum was used for the transaxle and crankcase. The car was sold for $1,250, equivalent to $43,192 in 2025.

The Sampson was manufactured in Detroit on Oakland Blvd, in a brand new city-block-long factory. There are only three survivors known to exist, and maybe a fourth in Australia. Five were registered in 1919 in the Australian state of Queensland.

In 1912, the United States Motor Company collapsed into bankruptcy and Sampson production ended.

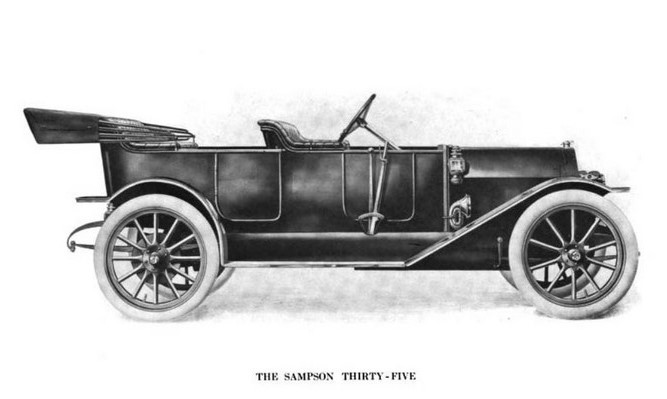
1911 Sampson 35 from Alden Sampson catalog

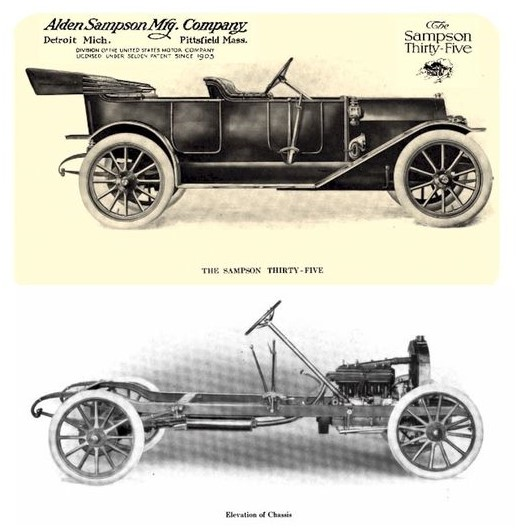
1912 Sampson 35 from Alden Sampson catalog

== Production models ==
- Alden Sampson Model 4-9a Truck
