= List of American Championship Car winners =

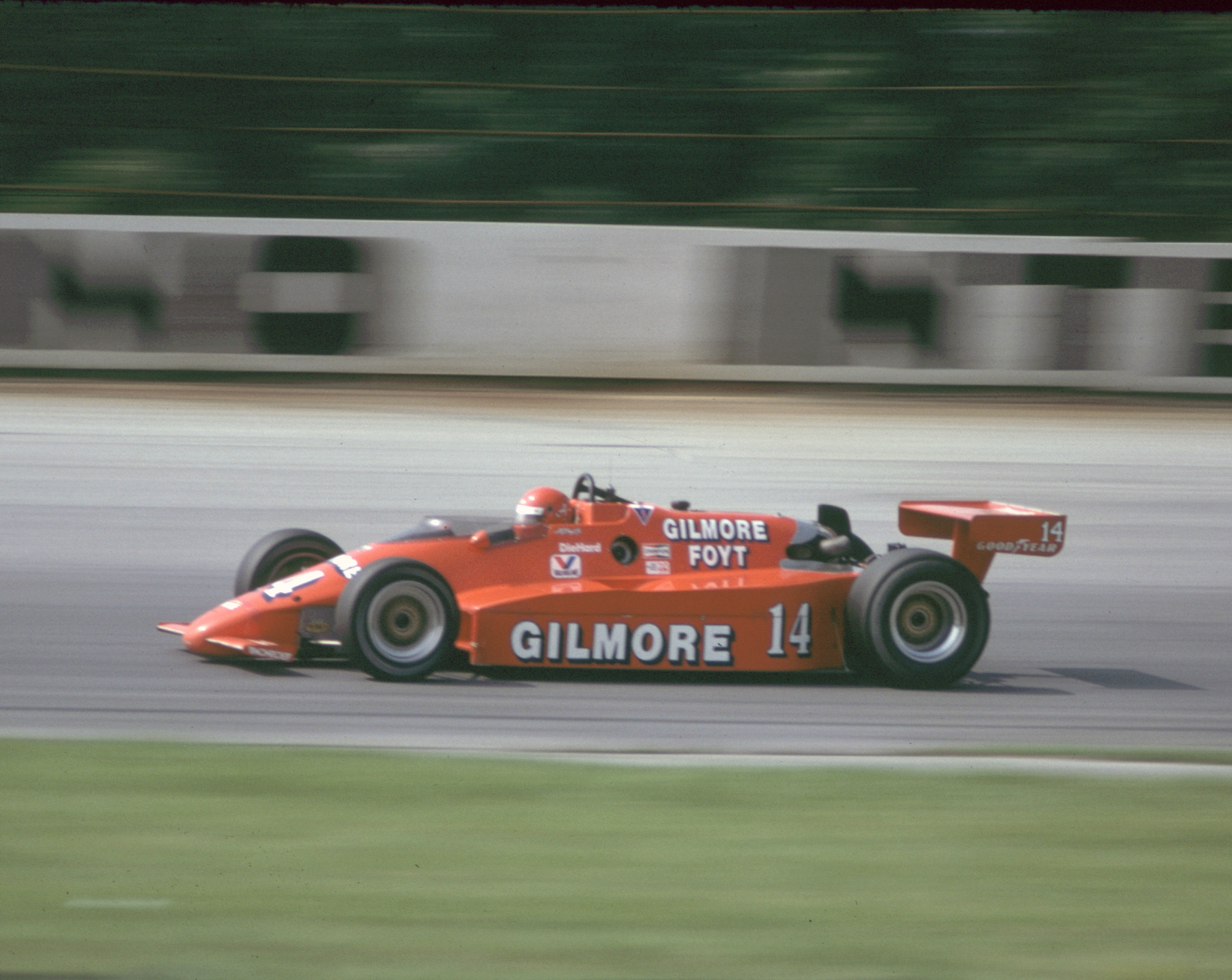
A. J. Foyt has the most career victories in Championship Car racing with 67.

The following is a list compiling the total number of career victories in open wheel American Championship car racing. The list recognizes IndyCar or Champ Car victories under the following auspices:

- American Automobile Association Contest Board (1905, 1916, and 1920–1955)
- United States Automobile Club (1956–1997)
- Championship Auto Racing Teams (1979–2003)
- Champ Car World Series (2004–2008)
- Indy Racing League/IndyCar Series (1996–present)

Colton Herta is the youngest winner of a major American open-wheel car race; he was 18 years, 11 months and 25 days old when he won the 2019 IndyCar Classic. Louis Unser is the oldest winner of a major American open-wheel car race; he was 57 years, 5 months and 22 days when he won the 1953 Pikes Peak International Hill Climb.

== Sanctioning bodies ==
The AAA Contest Board began sanctioning races as early as 1904. In the early years of the sport, only two seasons (1905 and 1916) an official national championship was recognized and awarded. Individual events from 1904, 1906–1915, and 1917–1919 are specifically excluded from the table below, due to the fact that they were not part of an official "championship" season.

The national championship was re-instated by AAA for 1920 and beyond. Retroactively awarded titles for the other years were later researched, although most historians consider them to be revisionist, and do not deem them as suitable for official record. All racing was suspended from 1942 to 1945, due to WWII. The 1946 season is a source of a statistical anomaly. The AAA Contest Board included a substantial number of "Big Car" races in the national championship for 1946, swelling the season to 77 events (6 Champ Car races and 71 Big Car races). Some later texts chose to dismiss the 71 Big Car races from record, but reliable records and historians contend that the season should be regarded as the full 77-race schedule.

Note that victories in the Indianapolis 500 from 1979 to 1995 are listed under the heading of USAC. While CART sanctioned the primary year-long season of races, the Indianapolis 500 itself remained under the sanctioning of USAC.

For 1996–1997, victories in the Indianapolis 500 and Indy Racing League are listed solely under the heading of IndyCar. For the first nine races of its existence (five in 1996 and four in 1997), the Indy Racing League fell under the sanctioning umbrella of USAC. After two controversial races in early 1997, sanctioning abruptly switched to in-house oversight by the IRL. In 2010, the series retired the term "IRL" in favor of "IndyCar."

Non-points races such as the Race of Two Worlds, Marlboro Challenge, the 2008 Nikon Indy 300, and the 2024 event at Thermal Club are not reflected in the totals below.

== National Championships chart ==
- Results current through the 2025 IndyCar Series season.

Driver	AAA (1905) (1916) (1920–1955)	USAC (1956–1979)	CART (1979–2003)	Champ Car World Series (2004–2007)	IRL IndyCar Series (1996–present)	Combined Total
(United States) A. J. Foyt	0	7	0	0	0	7
(New Zealand) Scott Dixon	0	0	0	0	6	6
(Spain) Álex Palou	0	0	0	0	5	5
(United States) Mario Andretti	0	3	1	0	0	4
(France) Sébastien Bourdais	0	0	0	4	0	4
(United Kingdom) Dario Franchitti	0	0	0	0	4	4
(United States) Louis Meyer	3	0	0	0	0	3
(United States) Ted Horn	3	0	0	0	0	3
(United States) Jimmy Bryan	1	2	0	0	0	3
(United States) Rick Mears	0	0	3	0	0	3
(United States) Al Unser	0	1	2	0	0	3
(United States) Bobby Rahal	0	0	3	0	0	3
(United States) Sam Hornish Jr.	0	0	0	0	3	3
(United States) Jimmy Murphy	2	0	0	0	0	2
(United States) Pete DePaolo	2	0	0	0	0	2
(United States) Wilbur Shaw	2	0	0	0	0	2
(United States) Rex Mays	2	0	0	0	0	2
(United States) Tony Bettenhausen	1	1	0	0	0	2
(United States) Rodger Ward	0	2	0	0	0	2
(United States) Joe Leonard	0	2	0	0	0	2
(United States) Bobby Unser	0	2	0	0	0	2
(United States) Tom Sneva	0	2	0	0	0	2
(United States) Al Unser Jr.	0	0	2	0	0	2
(Italy) Alex Zanardi	0	0	2	0	0	2
(Brazil) Gil de Ferran	0	0	2	0	0	2
(United States) Josef Newgarden	0	0	0	0	2	2
(Australia) Will Power	0	0	0	0	2	2
(United States) Barney Oldfield	1	0	0	0	0	1
(United Kingdom) Dario Resta	1	0	0	0	0	1
(United States) Gaston Chevrolet	1	0	0	0	0	1
(United States) Tommy Milton	1	0	0	0	0	1
(United States) Eddie Hearne	1	0	0	0	0	1
(United States) Harry Hartz	1	0	0	0	0	1
(United States) Billy Arnold	1	0	0	0	0	1
(United States) Louis Schneider	1	0	0	0	0	1
(United States) Bob Carey	1	0	0	0	0	1
(United States) Bill Cummings	1	0	0	0	0	1
(United States) Kelly Petillo	1	0	0	0	0	1
(United States) Mauri Rose	1	0	0	0	0	1
(United States) Floyd Roberts	1	0	0	0	0	1
(United States) Johnnie Parsons	1	0	0	0	0	1
(United States) Henry Banks	1	0	0	0	0	1
(United States) Chuck Stevenson	1	0	0	0	0	1
(United States) Sam Hanks	1	0	0	0	0	1
(United States) Bob Sweikert	1	0	0	0	0	1
(United States) Roger McCluskey	0	1	0	0	0	1
(United States) Gordon Johncock	0	1	0	0	0	1
(United States) Johnny Rutherford	0	0	1	0	0	1
(United States) Danny Sullivan	0	0	1	0	0	1
(Brazil) Emerson Fittipaldi	0	0	1	0	0	1
(United Kingdom) Nigel Mansell	0	0	1	0	0	1
(United States) Michael Andretti	0	0	1	0	0	1
(Canada) Jacques Villeneuve	0	0	1	0	0	1
(United States) Jimmy Vasser	0	0	1	0	0	1
(United States) Scott Sharp	0	0	0	0	1	1
(United States) Buzz Calkins	0	0	0	0	1	1
(United States) Tony Stewart	0	0	0	0	1	1
(Sweden) Kenny Bräck	0	0	0	0	1	1
(Colombia) Juan Pablo Montoya	0	0	1	0	0	1
(United States) Greg Ray	0	0	0	0	1	1
(United States) Buddy Lazier	0	0	0	0	1	1
(Brazil) Cristiano da Matta	0	0	1	0	0	1
(Canada) Paul Tracy	0	0	1	0	0	1
(Brazil) Tony Kanaan	0	0	0	0	1	1
(United Kingdom) Dan Wheldon	0	0	0	0	1	1
(United States) Ryan Hunter-Reay	0	0	0	0	1	1
(France) Simon Pagenaud	0	0	0	0	1	1

=== Notes ===
- The retroactively-awarded (unofficial) champions published by Haresnape & Means, and later Russ Catlin, are not reflected in the totals.
- Winners of the largely ceremonial USAC Gold Crown Championship (awarded from 1981 to 1995) are not included. During that period, the CART series conducted the national championship. Except for a dwindling "rump" period from 1980 to 1982, the Gold Crown title consisted of only the Indianapolis 500. Therefore, the Indy 500 winner was the de facto Gold Crown champion.
- Due to sanctioning body splits in the sport of American Open Wheel racing from 1979 to 2007, several years saw two separate champions awarded for separately sanctioned championship circuits. It is reflected in the table for 1979, and 1996–2007.
- Buzz Calkins and Scott Sharp tied for the three-race 1996 Indy Racing League championship. No rule existed to provide for a tiebreaker, and the two were declared co-champions.

== Race wins chart ==
- Results current through the completion of the 2026 IndyCar Series season

Key
#	Driver competing in the 2026 season

Rank	Driver	Nation	AAA 1905, 1916 1920–1955	AAA 1946 Big Car	USAC 1956–1995	CART 1979–2003	CCWS 2004–2007	IndyCar 1996–Present	Combined Total
1	A. J. Foyt	(United States)	0	0	67	0	0	0	67
2	Scott Dixon #	(New Zealand)	0	0	0	1	0	58	59
3	Mario Andretti	(United States)	0	0	33	19	0	0	52
4	Will Power #	(Australia)	0	0	0	0	2	43	45
5	Michael Andretti	(United States)	0	0	0	42	0	0	42
6	Al Unser	(United States)	0	0	36	3	0	0	39
7	Sébastien Bourdais	(France)	0	0	0	3	28	6	37
8	Bobby Unser	(United States)	0	0	25	10	0	0	35
9	Al Unser Jr.	(United States)	0	0	2	29	0	3	34
9	Josef Newgarden #	(United States)	0	0	0	0	0	34	34
11	Paul Tracy	(Canada)	0	0	0	26	5	0	31
11	Dario Franchitti	(United Kingdom)	0	0	0	10	0	21	31
11	Hélio Castroneves #	(Brazil)	0	0	0	6	0	25	31
14	Rick Mears	(United States)	0	0	7	22	0	0	29
15	Johnny Rutherford	(United States)	0	0	17	10	0	0	27
16	Rodger Ward	(United States)	2	0	24	0	0	0	26
17	Gordon Johncock	(United States)	0	0	20	5	0	0	25
17	Álex Palou #	(Spain)	0	0	0	0	0	25	25
19	Ted Horn	(United States)	5	19	0	0	0	0	24
19	Bobby Rahal	(United States)	0	0	1	23	0	0	24
21	Emerson Fittipaldi	(Brazil)	0	0	2	20	0	0	22
21	Tony Bettenhausen	(United States)	18	0	3	0	0	0	21
23	Bill Holland	(United States)	3	18	0	0	0	0	21
24	Sam Hornish Jr.	(United States)	0	0	0	0	0	19	19
24	Jimmy Bryan	(United States)	12	0	7	0	0	0	19
26	Ryan Hunter-Reay #	(United States)	0	0	0	1	1	16	18
27	Danny Sullivan	(United States)	0	0	1	16	0	0	17
27	Jimmy Murphy	(United States)	17	0	0	0	0	0	17
27	Tony Kanaan	(Brazil)	0	0	0	1	0	16	17
30	Dan Wheldon	(United Kingdom)	0	0	0	0	0	16	16
31	Alex Zanardi	(Italy)	0	0	0	15	0	0	15
31	Juan Pablo Montoya	(Colombia)	0	0	0	10	0	5	15
31	Simon Pagenaud	(France)	0	0	0	0	0	15	15
34	Tom Sneva	(United States)	0	0	4	9	0	0	13
35	Tommy Milton	(United States)	12	0	0	0	0	0	12
35	Gil de Ferran	(Brazil)	0	0	0	7	0	5	12
35	Cristiano da Matta	(Brazil)	0	0	0	11	1	0	12
35	Pato O'Ward #	(Mexico)	0	0	0	0	0	12	12
39	Adrián Fernández	(Mexico)	0	0	0	8	0	3	11
39	Johnnie Parsons	(United States)	11	0	0	0	0	0	11
41	Jimmy Vasser	(United States)	0	0	0	10	0	0	10
41	Pete DePaolo	(United States)	10	0	0	0	0	0	10
43	Kenny Bräck	(Sweden)	0	0	0	5	0	4	9
43	Scott Sharp	(United States)	0	0	0	0	0	9	9
43	Frank Lockhart	(United States)	9	0	0	0	0	0	9
43	Colton Herta	(United States)	0	0	0	0	0	9	9
47	Alexander Rossi #	(United States)	0	0	0	0	0	8	8
47	Scott McLaughlin #	(New Zealand)	0	0	0	0	0	8	8
47	Bruno Junqueira	(Brazil)	0	0	0	5	3	0	8
47	Rex Mays	(United States)	8	0	0	0	0	0	8
47	Buddy Lazier	(United States)	0	0	0	0	0	8	8
47	Eddie Sachs	(United States)	0	0	8	0	0	0	8
53	Ryan Briscoe	(Australia)	0	0	0	0	0	7	7
53	Louis Meyer	(United States)	7	0	0	0	0	0	7
53	Arie Luyendyk	(Netherlands)	0	0	1	2	0	4	7
53	Dan Gurney	(United States)	0	0	7	0	0	0	7
53	Lloyd Ruby	(United States)	0	0	7	0	0	0	7
53	Johnny Thomson	(United States)	1	0	6	0	0	0	7
53	Harry Hartz	(United States)	7	0	0	0	0	0	7
53	Justin Wilson	(United Kingdom)	0	0	0	0	4	3	7
53	Joie Chitwood	(United States)	0	7	0	0	0	0	7
53	Kyle Kirkwood #	(United States)	0	0	0	0	0	7	7
63	Ralph DePalma	(United States)	6	0	0	0	0	0	6
63	George Robson	(United States)	1	5	0	0	0	0	6
63	Don Branson	(United States)	0	0	6	0	0	0	6
63	Parnelli Jones	(United States)	0	0	6	0	0	0	6
63	Joe Leonard	(United States)	0	0	6	0	0	0	6
63	Danny Ongais	(United States)	0	0	6	0	0	0	6
63	Wilbur Shaw	(United States)	6	0	0	0	0	0	6
63	Bill Cummings	(United States)	6	0	0	0	0	0	6
63	Mauri Rose	(United States)	6	0	0	0	0	0	6
63	Gary Bettenhausen	(United States)	0	0	6	0	0	0	6
63	Graham Rahal #	(United States)	0	0	0	0	0	6	6
63	James Hinchcliffe	(Canada)	0	0	0	0	0	6	6
63	Takuma Sato #	(Japan)	0	0	0	0	0	6	6
75	Earl Cooper	(United States)	5	0	0	0	0	0	5
75	Dario Resta	(United Kingdom)	5	0	0	0	0	0	5
75	Johnny Aitken	(United States)	5	0	0	0	0	0	5
75	Patrick Carpentier	(Canada)	0	0	0	4	1	0	5
75	Scott Goodyear	(Canada)	0	0	0	2	0	3	5
75	Eddie Cheever	(United States)	0	0	0	0	0	5	5
75	Greg Ray	(United States)	0	0	0	0	0	5	5
75	Marcus Ericsson #	(Sweden)	0	0	0	0	0	5	5
75	A. J. Allmendinger	(United States)	0	0	0	0	5	0	5
75	Nigel Mansell	(United Kingdom)	0	0	0	5	0	0	5
75	Teo Fabi	(Italy)	0	0	0	5	0	0	5
75	Jacques Villeneuve	(Canada)	0	0	1	4	0	0	5
75	Greg Moore	(Canada)	0	0	0	5	0	0	5
75	Jim McElreath	(United States)	0	0	5	0	0	0	5
75	Jud Larson	(United States)	0	0	5	0	0	0	5
75	Wally Dallenbach Sr.	(United States)	0	0	5	0	0	0	5
75	Roger McCluskey	(United States)	0	0	5	0	0	0	5
75	Mike Mosley	(United States)	0	0	4	1	0	0	5
75	Bennett Hill	(United States)	5	0	0	0	0	0	5
75	Walt Ader	(United States)	1	4	0	0	0	0	5
75	Barney Oldfield	(United States)	5	0	0	0	0	0	5
97	Ray Keech	(United States)	4	0	0	0	0	0	4
97	Dave Lewis	(United States)	4	0	0	0	0	0	4
97	Frank Elliott	(United States)	4	0	0	0	0	0	4
97	Roscoe Sarles	(United States)	4	0	0	0	0	0	4
97	Eddie Hearne	(United States)	4	0	0	0	0	0	4
97	Bryan Herta	(United States)	0	0	0	2	0	2	4
97	Jim Hurtubise	(United States)	0	0	4	0	0	0	4
97	Jack McGrath	(United States)	4	0	0	0	0	0	4
97	Sam Hanks	(United States)	3	0	1	0	0	0	4
97	Bob Sweikert	(United States)	4	0	0	0	0	0	4
97	Chuck Stevenson	(United States)	4	0	0	0	0	0	4
97	Myron Fohr	(United States)	4	0	0	0	0	0	4
97	Leon Duray	(United States)	4	0	0	0	0	0	4
97	Shorty Cantlon	(United States)	4	0	0	0	0	0	4
97	Al Rogers	(United States)	4	0	0	0	0	0	4
97	Billy Winn	(United States)	4	0	0	0	0	0	4
97	Bill Vukovich	(United States)	4	0	0	0	0	0	4
97	Kelly Petillo	(United States)	4	0	0	0	0	0	4
97	Mike Conway	(United Kingdom)	0	0	0	0	0	4	4
116	Eddie Rickenbacker	(United States)	3	0	0	0	0	0	3
116	Buddy Rice	(United States)	0	0	0	0	0	3	3
116	Tony Stewart	(United States)	0	0	0	0	0	3	3
116	Ed Carpenter #	(United States)	0	0	0	0	0	3	3
116	Christian Lundgaard #	(Denmark)	0	0	0	0	0	3	3
116	André Ribeiro	(Brazil)	0	0	0	3	0	0	3
116	Max Papis	(Italy)	0	0	0	3	0	0	3
116	Mark Blundell	(United Kingdom)	0	0	0	3	0	0	3
116	George Amick	(United States)	0	0	3	0	0	0	3
116	Len Sutton	(United States)	0	0	3	0	0	0	3
116	Mark Donohue	(United States)	0	0	3	0	0	0	3
116	Jim Rathmann	(United States)	0	0	3	0	0	0	3
116	Pat Flaherty	(United States)	1	0	2	0	0	0	3
116	Walt Faulkner	(United States)	3	0	0	0	0	0	3
116	Jimmy Davies	(United States)	3	0	0	0	0	0	3
116	Billy Arnold	(United States)	3	0	0	0	0	0	3
116	Lee Wallard	(United States)	2	1	0	0	0	0	3
116	Bus Wilbert	(United States)	0	3	0	0	0	0	3
116	Louis Chevrolet	(United States)	3	0	0	0	0	0	3
135	Robert Doornbos	(Netherlands)	0	0	0	0	2	0	2
135	Robbie Buhl	(United States)	0	0	0	0	0	2	2
135	Tomas Scheckter	(South Africa)	0	0	0	0	0	2	2
135	Scott Pruett	(United States)	0	0	0	2	0	0	2
135	Roberto Guerrero	(Colombia)	0	0	0	2	0	0	2
135	Alex Barron	(United States)	0	0	0	0	0	2	2
135	Marco Andretti	(United States)	0	0	0	0	0	2	2
135	Felix Rosenqvist #	(Sweden)	0	0	0	0	0	2	2
135	John Paul Jr.	(United States)	0	0	0	1	0	1	2
135	Roberto Moreno	(Brazil)	0	0	0	2	0	0	2
135	Christian Fittipaldi	(Brazil)	0	0	0	2	0	0	2
135	Michel Jourdain Jr.	(Mexico)	0	0	0	2	0	0	2
135	Robby Gordon	(United States)	0	0	0	2	0	0	2
135	Mario Domínguez	(Mexico)	0	0	0	2	0	0	2
135	Art Pollard	(United States)	0	0	2	0	0	0	2
135	Pat O'Connor	(United States)	0	0	2	0	0	0	2
135	Jim Clark	(United Kingdom)	0	0	2	0	0	0	2
135	Paul Russo	(United States)	2	0	0	0	0	0	2
135	Manny Ayulo	(United States)	2	0	0	0	0	0	2
135	Bob McDonogh	(United States)	2	0	0	0	0	0	2
135	Joe Thomas	(United States)	2	0	0	0	0	0	2
135	Louis Unser	(United States)	2	0	0	0	0	0	2
135	Cliff Woodbury	(United States)	2	0	0	0	0	0	2
135	Lou Moore	(United States)	2	0	0	0	0	0	2
135	Babe Stapp	(United States)	2	0	0	0	0	0	2
135	Mel Hansen	(United States)	2	0	0	0	0	0	2
135	Bob Carey	(United States)	2	0	0	0	0	0	2
135	Harlan Fengler	(United States)	2	0	0	0	0	0	2
135	Pietro Bordino	(Italy)	2	0	0	0	0	0	2
135	Troy Ruttman	(United States)	2	0	0	0	0	0	2
135	George Connor	(United States)	1	1	0	0	0	0	2
135	Charles Van Acker	(United States)	1	1	0	0	0	0	2
135	Johnny Shackleford	(United States)	0	2	0	0	0	0	2
135	Oscar Ridlon	(United States)	0	2	0	0	0	0	2
135	Elbert Booker	(United States)	0	2	0	0	0	0	2
135	Tommy Hinnershitz	(United States)	0	2	0	0	0	0	2
171	I. P. Fetterman	(United States)	1	0	0	0	0	0	1
171	Howdy Wilcox	(United States)	1	0	0	0	0	0	1
171	Joe Boyer	(United States)	1	0	0	0	0	0	1
171	Eddie Pullen	(United States)	1	0	0	0	0	0	1
171	Gaston Chevrolet	(United States)	1	0	0	0	0	0	1
171	Jeff Ward	(United States)	0	0	0	0	0	1	1
171	Billy Boat	(United States)	0	0	0	0	0	1	1
171	Felipe Giaffone	(Brazil)	0	0	0	0	0	1	1
171	Mark Dismore	(United States)	0	0	0	0	0	1	1
171	Eliseo Salazar	(Chile)	0	0	0	0	0	1	1
171	Sam Schmidt	(United States)	0	0	0	0	0	1	1
171	Buzz Calkins	(United States)	0	0	0	0	0	1	1
171	Airton Daré	(Brazil)	0	0	0	0	0	1	1
171	Jaques Lazier	(United States)	0	0	0	0	0	1	1
171	Richie Hearn	(United States)	0	0	0	0	0	1	1
171	Jim Guthrie	(United States)	0	0	0	0	0	1	1
171	Danica Patrick	(United States)	0	0	0	0	0	1	1
171	Charlie Kimball	(United States)	0	0	0	0	0	1	1
171	Carlos Muñoz	(Colombia)	0	0	0	0	0	1	1
171	Carlos Huertas	(Colombia)	0	0	0	0	0	1	1
171	Rinus VeeKay #	(Netherlands)	0	0	0	0	0	1	1
171	Christian Rasmussen #	(Denmark)	0	0	0	0	0	1	1
171	Oriol Servià	(Spain)	0	0	0	0	1	0	1
171	Alex Tagliani	(Canada)	0	0	0	0	1	0	1
171	Nelson Philippe	(France)	0	0	0	0	1	0	1
171	Maurício Gugelmin	(Brazil)	0	0	0	1	0	0	1
171	Kevin Cogan	(United States)	0	0	0	1	0	0	1
171	Pancho Carter	(United States)	0	0	0	1	0	0	1
171	Jacques Villeneuve, Sr.	(Canada)	0	0	0	1	0	0	1
171	Héctor Rebaque	(Mexico)	0	0	0	1	0	0	1
171	John Andretti	(United States)	0	0	0	1	0	0	1
171	Bill Vukovich II	(United States)	0	0	1	0	0	0	1
171	Bobby Marshman	(United States)	0	0	1	0	0	0	1
171	Swede Savage	(United States)	0	0	1	0	0	0	1
171	Keith Kauffman	(United States)	0	0	1	0	0	0	1
171	Graham Hill	(United Kingdom)	0	0	1	0	0	0	1
171	Van Johnson	(United States)	0	0	1	0	0	0	1
171	George Snider	(United States)	0	0	1	0	0	0	1
171	Bud Tingelstad	(United States)	0	0	1	0	0	0	1
171	Elmer George	(United States)	0	0	1	0	0	0	1
171	Wes Vandervoort	(United States)	0	0	1	0	0	0	1
171	Bobby Grim	(United States)	0	0	1	0	0	0	1
171	Peter Revson	(United States)	0	0	1	0	0	0	1
171	Rich Vogler	(United States)	0	0	1	0	0	0	1
171	Dick Atkins	(United States)	0	0	1	0	0	0	1
171	Jim Packard	(United States)	0	0	1	0	0	0	1
171	Larry Rice	(United States)	0	0	1	0	0	0	1
171	Ronnie Bucknum	(United States)	0	0	1	0	0	0	1
171	Art Bisch	(United States)	0	0	1	0	0	0	1
171	Bobby Olivero	(United States)	0	0	1	0	0	0	1
171	George Follmer	(United States)	0	0	1	0	0	0	1
171	Emil Andres	(United States)	1	0	0	0	0	0	1
171	Henry Banks	(United States)	1	0	0	0	0	0	1
171	Bill Schindler	(United States)	1	0	0	0	0	0	1
171	Mike Nazaruk	(United States)	1	0	0	0	0	0	1
171	Fred Comer	(United States)	1	0	0	0	0	0	1
171	Fred Frame	(United States)	1	0	0	0	0	0	1
171	Duke Dinsmore	(United States)	1	0	0	0	0	0	1
171	Earl Devore	(United States)	1	0	0	0	0	0	1
171	Jimmy Snyder	(United States)	1	0	0	0	0	0	1
171	Walt Brown	(United States)	1	0	0	0	0	0	1
171	Norman Batten	(United States)	1	0	0	0	0	0	1
171	Jimmy Gleason	(United States)	1	0	0	0	0	0	1
171	Webb Jay	(United States)	1	0	0	0	0	0	1
171	Stubby Stubblefield	(United States)	1	0	0	0	0	0	1
171	Keith Andrews	(United States)	1	0	0	0	0	0	1
171	Bobby Ball	(United States)	1	0	0	0	0	0	1
171	Floyd Roberts	(United States)	1	0	0	0	0	0	1
171	Phil Shafer	(United States)	1	0	0	0	0	0	1
171	Bob Finney	(United States)	1	0	0	0	0	0	1
171	Johnny Mantz	(United States)	1	0	0	0	0	0	1
171	Louis Schneider	(United States)	1	0	0	0	0	0	1
171	George Souders	(United States)	1	0	0	0	0	0	1
171	George Hammond	(United States)	1	0	0	0	0	0	1
171	Fred Agabashian	(United States)	1	0	0	0	0	0	1
171	Floyd Davis	(United States)	1	0	0	0	0	0	1
171	Lora L. Corum	(United States)	1	0	0	0	0	0	1
171	Tazio Nuvolari	(Italy)	1	0	0	0	0	0	1
171	Bernd Rosemeyer	(Germany)	1	0	0	0	0	0	1
171	Charles Burman	(United States)	1	0	0	0	0	0	1
171	Bumpy Bumpus	(United States)	0	1	0	0	0	0	1
171	Joe Verebly	(United States)	0	1	0	0	0	0	1
171	Lucky Lux	(United States)	0	1	0	0	0	0	1
171	Hal Robson	(United States)	0	1	0	0	0	0	1
171	Hank Rogers	(United States)	0	1	0	0	0	0	1

=== Winners of non-championship events ===
A substantial number of non-championship races were sanctioned by the AAA Contest Board, namely from the periods from 1902–1904, 1906–1915, and 1917–1920. That includes the Indianapolis 500 in 1911, 1912, 1913, 1914, 1915, and 1919. Various other non-championship races have been conducted over the years by AAA, USAC, CART, and IRL from 1920–2008. The winners from those races are specifically not included in the main table above. Below is an abridged list of race winners from non-championship AAA races.

- Ralph DePalma (19)
- Bob Burman (6)
- Hughie Hughes (4)
- Ray Harroun (4)
- Louis Disbrow (4)
- Gil Andersen (3)
- Bert Dingley (3)
- Eddie O'Donnell (3)
- Charlie Merz (3)
- Cliff Durant (3)
- Teddy Tetzlaff (3)
- Bill Endicott (3)
- Tom Alley (2)
- Joe Dawson (2)
- Harry Grant (2)
- George Robertson (2)
- Tom Kincade (2)
- Harvey Herrick (2)
- Frank Lescault (1)
- Eaton McMillan (1)
- Howard Covey (1)
- Frank Gelnaw (1)
- Charles Bigelow (1)
- George Joerimann (1)
- Dave Buck (1)
- William Sharp (1)
- Charlie Arnold (1)
- Joe Matson (1)
- Bruce Keen (1)
- Armour Ferguson (1)
- Jules Goux (1)
- William Taylor (1)
- David Bruce-Brown (1)
- George Hill (1)
- Billy Knipper (1)
- Jack Fleming (1)
- Arthur See (1)
- Len Zengel (1)
- Louis Nikrent (1)
- Ira Vail (1)
- Billy Carlson (1)
- Spencer Wishart (1)
- Al Livingston (1)
- Joe Nikrent (1)
- Don Herr (1)
- Erwin Bergdoll (1)
- Herbert Lytle (1)
- Glover Ruckstell (1)
- John Jenkins (1)
- Harris Hanshue (1)
- Leigh Lynch (1)
- Pete Henderson (1)
- Mortimer Roberts (1)
- Lewis Strang (1)
- René Thomas (1)

Notes

- The USAC Race of Two Worlds was considered a non-championship event. Likewise, the 1966 event at Fuji was a non-championship event. In some seasons, the Pikes Peak International Hill Climb was a championship event, and in some seasons it was not.
- CART conducted the Marlboro Challenge all-star race from 1987–1992. This was considered a non-championship event.
- Two INDYCAR races were abandoned as they were stopped before the legal definition of an official race by the sanctioning body, half distance plus one lap, unlike the FIA Code, which requires three green flag laps to be conducted for an official race. The 1999 IRL VisionAire 500K at Charlotte Motor Speedway was cancelled after 79 laps, and struck from record, with no winner officially declared following a Lap 62 crash where a tire went into the grandstand, killing three spectators. Buddy Lazier was leading at the time of the Lap 61 caution, while Greg Ray was leading at the formal race abandonment after Lap 79. The 2011 IZOD IndyCar World Championship at Las Vegas Motor Speedway was halted and formally abandoned after 11 laps as a result of a multiple-car crash that involved the death of Dan Wheldon, with Tony Kanaan leading. Therefore, the total number of IRL/IndyCar races reflected in the chart is two fewer than the number of actual events. Both races are recognised as "cancelled events" with the box scores listed based on standings at the time of abandonment on Racing Reference.
- In the aftermath of the open wheel unification in early 2008, due to a scheduling conflict, the 2008 Long Beach Grand Prix was contested with former Champ Car teams and chassis. It was uniquely regarded as the "final" Champ Car race. However, it was officially contested under IndyCar sanction, awarded points towards the IndyCar championship, and race winner Will Power is credited with an IndyCar victory to his credit from the event. Furthermore, the Nikon Indy 300 was included on the 2008 schedule as a non-points exhibition race. Therefore, race winner Ryan Briscoe was not credited with an official victory for that event.
- In 1952, another open wheel series was formed alongside the AAA, the NASCAR Speedway Division. Only one full season, along with a second partial season, was held, and the division folded after only ten points races. Of the ten race winners, none of the drivers (seven total) managed to win any races under AAA or USAC sanctioning.

=== Race wins at different tracks ===
This is an overview of which drivers have achieved a win on which race track. Only the number of different racetracks is displayed. Several victories on a particular track are not highlighted. The number of wins per driver is therefore smaller than the total number of career victories.

Top 10 winners on different racetracks
Driver	Nation	Paved Short / Mile Ovals	Paved Intermediates / Superspeedways	Permanent Road Courses	Temporary Street Courses	Combined Total
Scott Dixon	(New Zealand)	5	9	7	7	28
Dario Franchitti	(United Kingdom)	4	7	3	9	23
Will Power	(Australia)	2	5	7	9	23
Sébastien Bourdais	(France)	1	2	6	12	21
Michael Andretti	(United States)	3	4	4	9	20
Al Unser Jr.	(United States)	2	7	2	7	18
Hélio Castroneves	(Brazil)	4	7	3	4	18
Paul Tracy	(Canada)	2	2	4	9	17
Mario Andretti	(United States)	3	3	6	4	16
Bobby Rahal	(United States)	4	3	4	3	14
Tony Kanaan	(Brazil)	4	8	1	1	14
Josef Newgarden	(United States)	2	4	4	4	14

==== Paved short and mile ovals ====
Driver	Total	CIC	DOV	IOW	MIL	NAZ	NHS	PHX	PPR	RIR	SAN	TRE	WDW
Scott Dixon	5 of 8	-		-	X	X	-	X	X	X			
Johnny Rutherford	4 of 4				X			X			X	X	
Bobby Rahal	4 of 5				-	X	X	X			X		
Dan Wheldon	4 of 6			X	-	X		-	X	X			
Tony Kanaan	4 of 7	-		X	X	-		X	-	X			
Dario Franchitti	4 of 8	-		X	X	-	-	-	X	X			
Hélio Castroneves	4 of 8	-		X	-	X	-	X	-	X			
Scott Sharp	4 of 9		X	-	-	X	X	X	-	-			-
A.J. Foyt	3 of 3				X			X				X	
Bobby Unser	3 of 3				X			X				X	
Mike Mosley	3 of 3				X			X				X	
Gordon Johncock	3 of 4				X			X			-	X	
Nigel Mansell	3 of 4				X	X	X	-					
Rick Mears	3 of 5				X	-		X			-	X	
Tony Stewart	3 of 5		-				X	-	X				X
Juan Pablo Montoya	3 of 5	X		-	X	X		-					
Mario Andretti	3 of 6				X	-	-	X			-	X	
Michael Andretti	3 of 6	-			X	X	-	X			-		
Ryan Hunter-Reay	3 of 6			X	X	-	X	-		-			
Sam Hornish Jr.	3 of 7			-	X	-		X	-	X			-
Kenny Bräck	3 of 9	X	-		X	-	-	-	X	-			-
Wally Dallenbach	2 of 3				X			-				X	
Simon Pagenaud	2 of 3			X	-			X					
Josef Newgarden	2 of 3			X	-			X					
Scott McLaughlin	2 of 3			X	X			-					
Pato O'Ward	2 of 3			X	X			-					
Al Unser	2 of 4				X			X			-	-	
Tom Sneva	2 of 4				X			X			-	-	
Danny Sullivan	2 of 5				-	X	-	-			X		
Emerson Fittipaldi	2 of 5				-	X	-	X			-		
Paul Tracy	2 of 5	-			X	X	-	-					
Jimmy Vasser	2 of 5	-			X	X	-	-					
Will Power	2 of 5			X	X		-	-		-			
Gil de Ferran	2 of 6	-			-	X		-	X	-			
Arie Luyendyk	2 of 7		-		-	X	-	X	-				-
Robbie Buhl	2 of 7		-		-	-	X	-		-			X
Greg Ray	2 of 7		X			-	-	-	X	-			-
Buddy Lazier	2 of 7		-		-	-	-	X	X	-			-
Eddie Cheever Jr.	2 of 8		-		-	-	-	-	X	-			X
Al Unser Jr.	2 of 9	-			X	-	X	-	-	-	-		-
Joe Leonard	1 of 3				X			-				-	
Gary Bettenhausen	1 of 3				-			-				X	
Roger McCluskey	1 of 3				X			-				-	
Mike Mosley	1 of 3				X			-				-	
Danny Ongais	1 of 3				X			-				-	
Teo Fabi	1 of 3				-			X			-		
Greg Moore	1 of 3	-			X	-							
Cristiano da Matta	1 of 3	X			-	-							
Álex Palou	1 of 3			X	-			-					
Christian Rasmussen	1 of 3			-	X			-					
Jim Guthrie	1 of 4		-				-	X					-
Kevin Cogan	1 of 4				-	-		X			-		
André Ribeiro	1 of 4				-	-	X	-					
Michel Jourdain Jr.	1 of 4	-			X	-		-					
Robby Gordon	1 of 5	-			-	-	-	X					
Ryan Briscoe	1 of 5			-	X		-	-		-			
Sébastien Bourdais	1 of 6	-		-	X		-	-		-			
Buzz Calkins	1 of 7		-		-	-	-	-		-			X
Scott Goodyear	1 of 7		-		-	-	-	X	-				-
Roberto Guerrero	1 of 7				-	-	-	X	-		-		-

==== Paved intermediates and superspeedways ====
Driver	Total	AMS	CHA	CHI	FON	GAT	HMS	IMS	KAN	KEN	LAU	LVS	MIC	MOT	NSS	ONT	POC	RIO	ROC	TMS	TWS	TRE
Scott Dixon	9 of 15			-	-	X	X	X	X	X	-	-	-	X	X		X		-	X		
Tony Kanaan	8 of 16			-	X	-	-	X	X	X	-	-	X	X	X		-	-	-	X		
Johnny Rutherford	7 of 7	X						X					X			X	X				X	X
Sam Hornish Jr.	7 of 12	-		X	X	-	X	X	X	X			-	-	-					X		
Dario Franchitti	7 of 14			X	X	-	X	X	-	-	-		-	-	X		-		X	X		
Hélio Castroneves	7 of 16			X	-	X	-	X	-	X	-	-	X	X	-		-	-	-	X		
A.J. Foyt	6 of 7	-						X					X			X	X				X	X
Rick Mears	5 of 6	X						X					X			-	X					X
Bobby Unser	5 of 7	-						X					X			X	X				-	X
Al Unser	5 of 7	-						X					X			X	X				X	-
Juan Pablo Montoya	5 of 8					X	-	X					X	-			X	X		-		
Dan Wheldon	5 of 11			X	-		X	X	X	-	-		-	X	-					-		
Will Power	5 of 13			-	X	X	-	X	-	-		-	-	-	-		X			X		
Gil de Ferran	5 of 14			-	-	X	-	X	-	-	-		-	-	X			-	X	X		
Adrián Fernández	5 of 14			X	X	-	-	-	-	X	-		-	X	-			X	-	-		
Al Unser Jr.	5 of 15	-		-	-	X	-	X	-	-		X	X	-	-		-	-		X		
Kenny Bräck	5 of 17	X	X	-	-	-	-	X	-	-	X	-	-	X	-			-	-	-		
Josef Newgarden	4 of 6				-	X		X							X		-			X		
Mario Andretti	4 of 7	-						X					X			-	X				-	X
Tom Sneva	4 of 7	-						X					X			-	X				X	-
Gordon Johncock	4 of 7	X						X					X			-	-				-	X
Michael Andretti	4 of 10				-	X	X	-			-		X	X			-	-	-			
Buddy Lazier	4 of 14	-	X	-	-	-	-	X	-	X		-	-	-	X					-		
Scott Sharp	4 of 14	X	-	-	-	-	-	-	-	X		-	-	X	-					X		
Bobby Rahal	3 of 4	-						X					X				X					
Danny Sullivan	3 of 4	-						X					X				X					
Mark Donohue	3 of 6							X					X			-	X				-	-
Joe Leonard	3 of 6							-					X			X	X				-	-
Arie Luyendyk	3 of 6	-	-					X				X	-							X		
Greg Moore	3 of 6				-	-	X						X	-				X				
Danny Ongais	3 of 7	-						-					X			X	-				X	-
Jimmy Vasser	3 of 9				X	-	X	-			-		X	-				-	-			
Ryan Briscoe	3 of 11			X	-		-	-	-	X			-	-	-		-			X		
Buddy Rice	3 of 12			-	-	-	-	X	X	-			X	-	-		-			-		
Ed Carpenter	3 of 12			-	X	-	-	-	-	X			-	-	-		-			X		
Emerson Fittipaldi	2 of 3							X					X				-					
Alexander Rossi	2 of 5					-		X							-		X			-		
Wally Dallenbach	2 of 6	-						-					-			X	-				-	X
Gary Bettenhausen	2 of 6							-					-			-	-				X	X
André Ribeiro	2 of 6				-	-	-						X	-				X				
Alex Zanardi	2 of 7				-	X	-				-		X	-				-				
John Paul Jr.	2 of 7	-	-					-				-	X				-			X		
Scott Goodyear	2 of 8	-	-				-	-		-		-	X							X		
Paul Tracy	2 of 11				-	X	-	-		-	-		-	-				X	-	-		
Alex Barron	2 of 11			-	-	-	-	-	-	-			X	-	X					-		
Tomas Scheckter	2 of 11			-	-	-	-	-	-	-			X	-	-					X		
Takuma Sato	2 of 11			-	-	X	-	X	-	-				-	-		-			-		
Graham Rahal	2 of 12			-	X	-	-	-	-	-		-		-	-		-			X		
Bryan Herta	2 of 13			-	-	-	-	-	X	-	-		X	-	-			-	-	-		
Eddie Cheever Jr.	2 of 14	-	-	-	-	-	-	X	X	-		-	-	-	-					-		
Ryan Hunter-Reay	2 of 14			-	-	-	-	X	-	-	-	-	-	-	-		X			-		
Sébastien Bourdais	2 of 15			-	-	-	-	-	-	-	X	X	-	-	-		-		-	-		
Nigel Mansell	1 of 2							-					X									
Jacques Villeneuve	1 of 2							X					-									
Teo Fabi	1 of 4	-						-					-				X					
Pato O'Ward	1 of 4					-		-							-					X		
Álex Palou	1 of 4					-		X							-					-		
Kyle Kirkwood	1 of 4					X		-							-					-		
Sam Schmidt	1 of 5	-	-					-				X								-		
Simon Pagenaud	1 of 5				-	-		X									-			-		
Marcus Ericsson	1 of 5					-		X							-		-			-		
Colton Herta	1 of 5					-		-							X		-			-		
Bill Vukovich Jr.	1 of 6							-					X			-	-				-	-
Pancho Carter	1 of 6	-						-					X			-	-					-
Scott Pruett	1 of 6				-	-	-						X	-				-				
Mark Blundell	1 of 6				X	-	-						-	-				-				
Roger McCluskey	1 of 7	-						-					X			-	-				-	-
Mike Mosley	1 of 7	-						-					-			-	-				-	X
Christian Fittipaldi	1 of 9				X		-	-			-	-	-	-				-	-			
Cristiano da Matta	1 of 9				X	-	-				-	-	-	-				-	-			
Max Papis	1 of 10				-		X	-			-	-	-	-				-	-	-		
Danica Patrick	1 of 10			-	-		-	-	-	-			-	X	-					-		
Airton Dare	1 of 11	-		-	-	-	-	-	X	-			-		-					-		
Jeff Ward	1 of 12	-	-	-	-	-	-	-	-	-			-		-					X		
Felipe Giaffone	1 of 12	-		-	-	-	-	-	-	X			-	-	-					-		
Justin Wilson	1 of 12			-	-		-	-	-	-		-	-	-	-		-			X		
Richie Hearn	1 of 13			-	-	-	-	-	-	-		X	-	-	-			-		-		
Eliseo Salazar	1 of 13	-	-	-	-	-	-	-	-	-		X	-		-					-		
Billy Boat	1 of 13	-	-	-	-	-	-	-	-	-		-	-		-					X		
Mark Dismore	1 of 13	-	-	-	-	-	-	-	-	-		-	-		-					X		
Bruno Junqueira	1 of 13			-	-	-	-	-	-	-	-	-	-	X					-	-		
Greg Ray	1 of 14	X	-	-	-	-	-	-	-	-		-	-	-	-					-		
Jaques Lazier	1 of 14	-	-	X	-	-	-	-	-	-		-	-	-	-					-		
Patrick Carpentier	1 of 15			-	-	-	-	-	-	-	-	-	X	-	-			-	-	-		

==== Permanent Road Courses ====
Driver	Total	ASS	BMP	BRH	COA	CTM	IGP	LAG	MEX	MOH	MOT	MTT	NOL	POR	ROA	RIV	SIL	SNM	THE	WGL	ZOL
Scott Dixon	7		-		-		X	X		X	X		-	-	X			X	-	X	
Will Power	7	-	X		-		X	-	-	X	-	-	-	X	X			X	-	X	-
Álex Palou	7		X				X	X		X				X	X				X		
Sébastien Bourdais	6	-	-	X	-		-	X	X	-	-	-	-	X	X			-		-	X
Mario Andretti	6							X	-	X		X		X	X	X				-	
Rick Mears	5			X		-		X	X	-				-		-	X	-		X	
Michael Andretti	4							X		X				X	X						
Alex Zanardi	4							X		X				X	X						
Paul Tracy	4	-		-				X	X	X		-		-	X						-
Simon Pagenaud	4		X		-		X	-		X			-	-	-			X		-	
Josef Newgarden	4		X		-		X	-		X			-	-	X			-	-	-	
Bobby Rahal	4							X	-	X				X	-	X				-	
Colton Herta	4		-		X		X	X		X				-	-				-		
Alexander Rossi	4		-		-		X	-		X				-	X			-	-	X	
Dan Gurney	3					X										X		X			
Emerson Fittipaldi	3							-		X				X	X	-					
Danny Sullivan	3							X	-	-				X	X	-				-	
Cristiano da Matta	3							X	-	-				X	X						
Hélio Castroneves	3		-				-	X		X	-		-	-	-			X		-	
Justin Wilson	3	X		-			-	-	X	-		-	-	-	-			-		X	-
Dario Franchitti	3		-					-	-	X	-			-	X			X		-	
Ryan Hunter-Reay	3		X		-		-	-		-	-		-	-	-			X		X	
Scott McLaughlin	3		X				-	-		X				X	-				-		
A.J. Foyt	2			-		X											X				
Bobby Unser	2			-		X		-	-	-				-	-	-	-			X	
Teo Fabi	2							X	-	X				-	-	-				-	
Al Unser Jr.	2							-		X				X	-						
Gil de Ferran	2							X		-				X	-						
Max Papis	2							X		-				X	-						
Patrick Carpentier	2			-				X	-					X	-						
Adrián Fernández	2			-				-	-	X				X	-						
A. J. Allmendinger	2							-	-	-				X	X						
Ryan Briscoe	2		-				-			X	-							X	-		
Takuma Sato	2		X		-		-	-		-	-		-	X	-			-		-	
Pato O'Ward	2		X		-		-	-		X				-	-			-	-		
Danny Ongais	1			-		X											-				
Johnny Rutherford	1			-		-		-	-	X				-	-	-	-			-	
Héctor Rebaque	1							-	-	-				-	X	-				-	
Roberto Guerrero	1							-	-	X				-	-	-				-	
Jacques Villeneuve Sr.	1							-	-	-				-	X	-				-	
Jacques Villeneuve Jr.	1							-		-				-	X						
Mark Blundell	1							-		-				X	-						
Jimmy Vasser	1						-	X	-	-				-	-						
Bryan Herta	1							X	-	-				-	-						
Christian Fittipaldi	1							-	-	-				-	X						
Juan Pablo Montoya	1		-				-	-		X			-	-	-			-		-	
Bruno Junqueira	1	-		-				-	-	-		-		-	X						-
Kenny Bräck	1							-	X	-				-	-						
Alex Tagliani	1	-	-	-				-	-	-	-	-		-	X						-
Robert Doornbos	1	-	-	-				-	-	-		X		-	-						-
Tony Kanaan	1		-		-		-	-		-	-		-	-	-			X		-	
Marco Andretti	1		-		-		-	-		-	-		-		-			X		-	
Charlie Kimball	1		-		-		-	-		X	-		-	-	-			-		-	
Graham Rahal	1	-	-		-		-	-	-	X	-	-	-	-	-			-	-	-	-
James Hinchcliffe	1		-		-		-	-		-	-		X	-	-			-		-	
Felix Rosenqvist	1		-		-		-	-		-				-	X				-		
Rinus VeeKay	1		-				X	-		-				-	-				-		

==== Temporary Street Courses ====
Driver	Total	Arlington	Baltimore	Cleveland	Denver		Detroit			Edmonton	Houston		Las Vegas		Long Beach	Miami			Monterrey	Montreal	Nashville	New York	San Jose	São Paulo	St. Petersburg	Surfers Paradise	Toronto	Vancouver	
Driver	Total	ARL	INH	BLA	CIV	PEP	DET I	DET II	BEL	EDM	GBC	NRG	CPL	FRE	LBH	TAM	BIC	BAY	FUN	CGV	NAS	MEA	SJO	SAO	AWA	SUR	EXH	CPP1	CPP2
Sébastien Bourdais	12			X		X			X	X		X		-	X			-	X	X	-		X		X	X	X		-
Michael Andretti	9			X	-	-	X		X		-		-		X	X	-	-	-	-		X				X	X	X	-
Paul Tracy	9			X		-	-		X	-	X	-		-	X		-	-	X	-			-		X	X	X	-	X
Dario Franchitti	9		-	X		-			X		X	-			X			-	-	X				-	X	X	X		X
Will Power	9	-	X	-		-		-	X	X		X		X	X				-	-	-		-	X	X	-	X		
Scott Dixon	7	-	-	-		-		X	X	X	-	X			X			-	-	-	X			-	-	-	X		-
Al Unser Jr.	7			X	X		-		-		-		-		X	X	-					X				-	X	X	-
Danny Sullivan	5			X	-		-		X				-		X	X	-					X				-	-	-	
Alex Zanardi	5			X					X		-				X				-							X	X	-	-
Ryan Hunter-Reay	5		X	-		-			X	-		-			X			-	-	-	-		-	-	-	X	X		-
Simon Pagenaud	5		X					-	X	-		X			X						-			-	-		X		
Mario Andretti	4			X	-		-		-				X		X	-						X				-	-	-	
Emerson Fittipaldi	4			X	-		X		-				-		-	-	-					-				X	X	-	
Juan Pablo Montoya	4			X					-		-	-			X										X	-	-		X
Cristiano da Matta	4			-		-			-	-	-	-			-			X	X	-			-		-	X	X		-
Hélio Castroneves	4		-	-				-	X	X	-	-			X				-						X	-	-		-
Bruno Junqueira	4			-		X			-	-	-	-		-	-			-	X	X			-		-	X	-		-
Josef Newgarden	4	-						-	X	-		-			X						-			-	X		X		
Kyle Kirkwood	4	X						X	-						X						X				-		-		
Bobby Rahal	3			X	-		-		X		-		-		-	-	-					X				-	-	-	-
Jimmy Vasser	3			-		-			-	-	X				X		-	-	-	-			-		-	X	-	-	-
A. J. Allmendinger	3			X		X				-		-			-			-	-	-			-		-	-	X		-
Mike Conway	3		-						X	-					X									-	-		X		
James Hinchcliffe	3		-						-	-		-			X						-			X	X		-		
Marcus Ericsson	3	-						-	X						-						X				X		-		
Colton Herta	3							-	-						X						-				X		X		
Pato O'Ward	3	-						-	X						-						-				X		X		
Álex Palou	3	-						X	-						-						X				X		-		
Jacques Villeneuve	2			X					-								X									-	-	-	
Adrián Fernández	2			-		-			-	-	-				-		-	-	-	-			-		-	X	X	-	-
Roberto Moreno	2			X		-			-		-	-						-	-	-		-			-	-	-	-	X
Gil de Ferran	2			X					-		X				-		-		-							-	-	-	-
Mario Domínguez	2			-		-			-	-		-		-	-			X	-	-			-		-	X	-		-
Graham Rahal	2	-	-	-				-	X	-		-		-	-						-		-	-	X	-	-		
Justin Wilson	2		-	-		-			-	X		-		-	-			-	-	-			-	-	-	-	X		-
Al Unser	1			X									-		-	-						-					-		
Tom Sneva	1			-			-						X		-	-						-					-		
John Andretti	1			-	-		-		-						-	-						-				X	-	-	
Nigel Mansell	1			-					-						-											X	-	-	
Robby Gordon	1			-					X						-		-									-	-	-	-
Scott Pruett	1			-	-		-		-		-				-		-					-				X	-	-	-
Greg Moore	1			-					X		-				-											-	-	-	-
Mark Blundell	1			-					-		-				-											-	X	-	-
Maurício Gugelmin	1			-					-		-				-				-							-	-	X	-
Patrick Carpentier	1			X		-			-		-	-			-			-	-	-					-	-	-		-
Michel Jourdain Jr.	1			-		-			-		-				-			-	-	X					-	-	-	-	-
Dan Wheldon	1									-					-									-	X	-	-		
Oriol Servià	1		-	-		-			-	-	-	-			-			-	-	X			-	-	-	-	-		-
Nelson Philippe	1			-		-				-		-			-			-	-	-			-		-	X	-		
Robert Doornbos	1			-						-		-		-	-								X			-	-		
Tony Kanaan	1			-					X		-				-				-					-	-	-	-		-
Ryan Briscoe	1		-						-	-		-			-									-	X	x	-		
Takuma Sato	1		-						-			-			X						-			-	-		-		
Carlos Huertas	1								-			X			-										-		-		
Carlos Muñoz	1								X			-			-										-		-		
Alexander Rossi	1	-						-	-						X						-				-		-		
Scott McLaughlin	1	-						-	-						-						-				X		-		
Christian Lundgaard	1	-						-	-						-						-				-		X		

==== Notes ====
Track Colors
Track is part of 2026 season
Track was part of the CART/IndyCar Series between 1979 and 2025
Track was part of the USAC Championship Car Series between 1971 and 1981

Key
X - at least one win in a points race	x - at least one win in a non-points race	- participation, but no win	no entry = no participation

== Race wins by nationality ==
- All figures current through the 2025 IndyCar Series season.

List of races won by nationality of driver
Rank	Country	Wins	Driver(s)	Last Win (Year)
1	United States	1119	192	2025
2	Brazil	112	12	2021
3	United Kingdom	74	9	2014
4	New Zealand	66	2	2025
5	Canada	59	9	2018
6	France	53	3	2020
7	Australia	52	2	2025
8	Italy	26	5	2001
9	Mexico	25	5	2025
10	Spain	20	2	2025
11	Colombia	19	4	2016
12	Sweden	14	3	2023
13	Netherlands	10	3	2021
14	Japan	6	1	2020
15	South Africa	2	1	2005
15	Denmark	2	2	2025
17	Chile	1	1	1997
17	Germany	1	1	1937

== Race wins by teams ==
Total all-time victories for Indy car teams (selected teams & active teams). All figures current through the 2025 IndyCar Series season.

- Team Penske: 246
- Chip Ganassi Racing: 145
- Newman/Haas Racing: 107
- Andretti Global: 77
- Vel's Parnelli Jones Racing: 53
- All American Racers: 51
- A. J. Foyt Enterprises: 44
- Patrick Racing: 43
- Forsythe/Pettit Racing: 33
- Rahal Letterman Lanigan Racing: 30
- Team Green: 23
- Galles Racing: 21
- Truesports: 18
- Arrow McLaren: 16
- Panther Racing: 15
- Team Menard: 10
- Hemelgarn Racing: 8
- Shierson Racing: 7
- KV Racing Technology: 7
- Ed Carpenter Racing: 7
- Dale Coyne Racing: 6
- CFH Racing: 2
- Harding Steinbrenner Racing: 2
- Dreyer & Reinbold Racing: 1
- Bryan Herta Autosport: 1
- Sarah Fisher Hartman Racing: 1
- Meyer Shank Racing: 1

== See also ==
- List of Indianapolis 500 winners
- List of all-time NASCAR Cup Series winners
- List of Formula One Grand Prix winners
