= Hank Rogers =

American racing driver (1917–unknown)

- Born: Hank Rakowski; June 22, 1917 New Jersey, U.S.
- Died: unknown

Champ Car career
- 23+ races run over 3 years
- Best finish: 13th (1946)
- First race: 1946 Williams Grove Race #2 (Mechanicsburg)
- Last race: 1949 Syracuse 100 (Syracuse)
- First win: 1946 Charlotte Race #2 (Metrolina)
Wins	Podiums	Poles
1	4	0

Hank Rogers (born Hank Rakowski; June 22, 1917 – unknown) was an American racing driver. He competed in the American Automobile Association (AAA) sanctioned National Championship in 1946, 1949, and 1950.

During a career working as a potter in Trenton, New Jersey, Rogers began racing in 1946 as a last-minute fill in after his brother-in-law, a regular auto racer, was injured before a race. Rogers performed strongly in the event, and was offered a ride. Later that year, diving a car once owned by Joie Chitwood, Rogers won a Championship event at the Metrolina Fairgrounds near Charlotte, North Carolina.

Rogers scored a notable victory at the Reading, Pennsylvania fairgrounds. Driving a newly built car completed only minutes before the event, Rogers defeated a strong field of drivers that included Ted Horn, Tommy Hinnershitz, Bill Holland, and Spider Webb.
