= Danny Kladis =

American racing driver (1917–2009)

- Born: Dan Peter Kladis; February 10, 1917 Crystal City, Missouri, U.S.
- Died: April 26, 2009 (aged 92) Joliet, Illinois, U.S.

Champ Car career
- 4 races run over 9 years
- First race: 1946 Indianapolis 500 (Indianapolis)
- Last race: 1956 Rex Mays Classic (Milwaukee)
Wins	Podiums	Poles
0	0	0

Formula One World Championship career
- Active years: 1950–1952, 1954–1955, 1957
- Team(s): Maserati, Miller, Diedt, Bromme, Kurtis Kraft
- Entries: 6 (1 start)
- Championships: 0
- Wins: 0
- Podiums: 0
- Career points: 0
- Pole positions: 0
- Fastest laps: 0
- First entry: 1950 Indianapolis 500
- Last entry: 1957 Indianapolis 500

Dan Peter Kladis (February 10, 1917 or February 10, 1916 – April 26, 2009) was an American racing driver. 92-year-old Kladis was the oldest living Indianapolis 500 starter at the time of his death.

== Racing career ==
Kladis began his racing career in midget cars during 1935. When auto racing in the United States resumed after the Second World War, Kladis started in the 1946 Indianapolis 500, driving for Andy Granatelli; Kladis finished 21st.

Kladis drove 50 laps as a relief driver for Spider Webb during the 1954 Indianapolis 500. Kladis attempted to make the 500 field until the 1957 Indianapolis 500 but was often unsuccessful.

=== World Drivers' Championship career ===
The AAA/USAC-sanctioned Indianapolis 500 was included in the FIA World Drivers' Championship from 1950 through 1960. Drivers competing at Indianapolis during those years were credited with World Drivers' Championship participation, and were eligible to score WDC points alongside those which they may have scored towards the AAA/USAC National Championship.

Kladis participated in one World Drivers' Championship race at Indianapolis. He relieved Spider Webb, finishing in 30th place. He scored no World Drivers' Championship points.

== Personal life ==
While Kladis' birth date on most documents is 1917, on his WWII draft card it is given as 1916. He served as a pilot in the United States Army Air Corps during the War.

Kladis was the father of seven children: George, Joanne, Carole, Ciciela, Christopher, Danny Jr, and Michael.

== Awards and honors ==
Kladis was inducted into the National Midget Auto Racing Hall of Fame in 2007.

== Motorsports career results ==
=== Indianapolis 500 results ===
Year	Car	Chassis	Engine	Start	Qual	Rank	Finish	Laps	Led	Retired
1946	59	Miller	Ford	33	118.890	32	21	46	0	Towed
1949	58		Lencki	Failed to qualify						
1950	39	Maserati	Maserati	Failed to qualify						
1951	89	Miller	Miller	Failed to qualify						
1952	19	Diedt	Offy	Failed to qualify						
1954*	65	Bromme	Offy	-	-	-	30	?	?	Fuel pump
1955	93	Kurtis Kraft	Offy	Failed to qualify						
1957	72	Maserati	Maserati	Failed to qualify						
1957	84	Mercedes	Jaguar	Failed to qualify						
Totals								46	0	

Starts	1
Poles	0
Front Row	0
Wins	0
Top 5	0
Top 10	0
Retired	1

* shared drive with Spider Webb

=== FIA World Drivers' Championship results ===
(key)

Year	Entrant	Chassis	Engine	1	2	3	4	5	6	7	8	9	WDC	Pts
1950	Federal Engineering	Maserati 8CTF	Maserati 3.0 L8 s	GBR	MON	500; DNQ	SUI	BEL	FRA	ITA			NC	0
1951	Trainor Chicago	Trainor Special	Miller L6 s	SUI	500; DNQ	BEL	FRA	GBR	GER	ITA	ESP		NC	0
1952	Tuffanelli-Derrico	Diedt Tuffanelli Derrico	Offenhauser 4.5 L4	SUI	500; DNQ	BEL	FRA	GBR	GER	NED	ITA		NC	0
1954	Advance Muffler	Bromme D	Offenhauser 4.5 L4	ARG	500; 30	BEL	FRA	GBR	GER	SUI	ITA	ESP	NC	0
1955	Roy McKay	Kurtis Kraft 3000	Offenhauser 4.5 L4	ARG	MON	500; DNQ	BEL	NED	GBR	ITA			NC	0
1957	Morgan Engineering	Maserati 4CLT/48	Maserati 4CLT 1.5 L4 s	ARG	MON	500; DNQ	FRA	GBR	GER	PES	ITA		NC	0
1957	Safety Auto Glass	Mercedes W154	Jaguar 3.4 L6			500; DNQ							NC	0
