= 1946 AAA Championship Car season =

Sports season

- AAA National Championship Trail

Season
- Races: 77
- Start date: April 14
- End date: November 10

Awards
- National champion: (United States) Ted Horn
- Indianapolis 500 winner: (United States) George Robson

The 1946 AAA Championship Car season was the first season of American Championship car racing following World War II. After four years without automobile racing in the United States, the AAA Contest Board was initially concerned about having enough races, enough entrants, and suitable equipment, to contest season on such short notice for 1946. Even the Indianapolis 500 was in doubt, as the Indianapolis Motor Speedway had fallen into a terrible state of neglect during the war years.

Indianapolis Motor Speedway owner Eddie Rickenbacker sold the track to Tony Hulman in November 1945, by which time it had fallen into a dilapidated state of disrepair. As the season progressed, it proved to be a success, and marked a triumphant return of the National Championship. Hulman's swift and herculean efforts to renovate Indianapolis in just six months allowed for the 1946 Indianapolis 500 to be run as scheduled on May 30, and it was won by George Robson.

George Robson and George Barringer were killed at Atlanta during the race. Al Putnam died at the Indiana State Fairgrounds Speedway during qualifying.

== Background ==
Previously, only races of over 100 miles (160 km) in length on tracks that were one mile (1.6 km) or longer were permitted to host National Championship events. Due to the concerns about the car counts and participation, the AAA Contest Board included a substantial number of "Big Car" races (today known as Sprint Cars) as part of the championship. The season officially consisted of 77 races (6 Championship Car races and 71 Big Car races), beginning at Mechanicsburg on April 14 and concluding at Richmond on November 10. Two non-points, exhibition races were also part of the calendar season.

After car counts and participation was better than expected, some confusion arose over as to whether the 71 Big Car events still counted towards the National Championship. Some news publications of the time erroneously reported the points totals from only the six Champ Car events, implying - or incorrectly assuming - that the Big Car races had been, or would be, dropped. Nevertheless, despite all of the second-guessing and speculation, a full 77-race season was completed.

The Contest Board met after the season, and it was not until then which they declared the Big Car races would be dropped from the National Championship - effective for 1947. The ruling cemented the notion that the 71 Big Car races were indeed recognized as part of the official 1946 season. Furthermore, the prize money and 1947 car number assignments are consistent with the final points standings reflecting the full 77-race schedule.

Despite later publications suggesting the season was only six races (including official statistical publications released by the league decades later), historians firmly contend that the 1946 season should be recognized as the full 77-race schedule.

The AAA National Champion was Ted Horn, and the Indianapolis 500 winner was George Robson. Incidentally, based on his points totals, Horn would have been declared the champion with or without the 71 "Big Car" races included. This oddity has help contribute to the illusion of a six-race season.

== Schedule and results ==
Non-championship race

Rnd	Date	Race name	Length	Track	Location	Type	Class	Winning driver
NC	March 31	Mike Benton Sweepstakes	20 mi (32 km)	Lakewood Speedway	Atlanta, Georgia	Dirt Oval	Big Car	Jimmy Wilburn
1	April 14	Williams Grove Race	15 mi (24 km)	Williams Grove Speedway	Mechanicsburg, Pennsylvania	Dirt Oval	Big Car	Walt Ader
2	April 28	Williams Grove Race	15 mi (24 km)	Williams Grove Speedway	Mechanicsburg, Pennsylvania	Dirt Oval	Big Car	Ted Horn
3	May 5	Eastern Inaugural Trophy Sweepstakes	20 mi (32 km)	Trenton International Speedway	Trenton, New Jersey	Dirt Oval	Big Car	Joie Chitwood
4	May 19	Williams Grove Race	15 mi (24 km)	Williams Grove Speedway	Mechanicsburg, Pennsylvania	Dirt Oval	Big Car	Joie Chitwood
5	May 26	Inaugural Sam Nunis Trophy Sweepstakes	12.5 mi (20.1 km)	Reading Fairgrounds Speedway	Reading, Pennsylvania	Dirt Oval	Big Car	Walt Ader
6	May 26	Winchester Race	15 mi (24 km)	Winchester Speedway	Winchester, Indiana	Dirt Oval	Big Car	Bus Wilbert
7	May 30	Altamont Race	15 mi (24 km)	Altamont Speedway	Altamont, New York	Dirt Oval	Big Car	Bumpy Bumpus
8	May 30	International 500 Mile Sweepstakes	500 mi (800 km)	Indianapolis Motor Speedway	Speedway, Indiana	Paved Oval	Champ Car	George Robson
9	May 30	Trenton Race	20 mi (32 km)	Trenton International Speedway	Trenton, New Jersey	Dirt Oval	Big Car	Johnny Shackleford
10	June 2	Lakewood Race	25 mi (40 km)	Lakewood Speedway	Atlanta, Georgia	Dirt Oval	Big Car	Ted Horn
11	June 9	Thompson Race	15 mi (24 km)	Thompson International Speedway	Thompson, Connecticut	Paved Oval	Big Car	Oscar Ridlon
12	June 9	Williams Grove Race	15 mi (24 km)	Williams Grove Speedway	Mechanicsburg, Pennsylvania	Dirt Oval	Big Car	Joie Chitwood
13	June 9	Winchester Race	15 mi (24 km)	Winchester Speedway	Winchester, Indiana	Dirt Oval	Big Car	Bus Wilbert
14	June 16	Flemington Race	12.5 mi (20.1 km)	Flemington Speedway	Flemington, New Jersey	Dirt Oval	Big Car	Ted Horn
15	June 23	Dayton Race	15 mi (24 km)	Dayton Speedway	Dayton, Ohio	Dirt Oval	Big Car	Elbert Booker
16	June 23	Greensboro Race	12.5 mi (20.1 km)	Greensboro Agricultural Fairgrounds	Greensboro, North Carolina	Dirt Oval	Big Car	Ted Horn
17	June 23	Thompson Race	15 mi (24 km)	Thompson International Speedway	Thompson, Connecticut	Paved Oval	Big Car	Oscar Ridlon
18	June 29	Dayton Race	10 mi (16 km)	Dayton Speedway	Dayton, Ohio	Dirt Oval	Big Car	Bus Wilbert
19	June 30	Langhorne 100	100 mi (160 km)	Langhorne Speedway	Langhorne, Pennsylvania	Dirt Oval	Champ Car	Rex Mays
20	June 30	Powell Race	7.5 mi (12.1 km)	Powell Motor Speedway	Powell, Ohio	Dirt Oval	Big Car	Joie Chitwood
21	June 30	Thompson Race	12.5 mi (20.1 km)	Thompson International Speedway	Thompson, Connecticut	Paved Oval	Big Car	Joe Verebly
22	July 4	Lakewood Race	20 mi (32 km)	Lakewood Speedway	Atlanta, Georgia	Dirt Oval	Big Car	Ted Horn
23	July 7	Lakewood Race	50 mi (80 km)	Lakewood Speedway	Atlanta, Georgia	Dirt Oval	Big Car	Ted Horn
24	July 7	Williams Grove Race	15 mi (24 km)	Williams Grove Speedway	Mechanicsburg, Pennsylvania	Dirt Oval	Big Car	Johnny Shackleford
25	July 14	Inaugural Nunis Sweepstakes	17.5 mi (28.2 km)	Reading Fairgrounds Speedway	Reading, Pennsylvania	Dirt Oval	Big Car	Joie Chitwood
26	July 20	DuBois Race	10 mi (16 km)	DuBois Fairgrounds	DuBois, Pennsylvania	Dirt Oval	Big Car	Ted Horn
27	July 20	Selinsgrove Race	10 mi (16 km)	Selinsgrove Speedway	Selinsgrove, Pennsylvania	Dirt Oval	Big Car	Bill Holland
28	July 21	Dayton Race	10 mi (16 km)	Dayton Speedway	Dayton, Ohio	Dirt Oval	Big Car	George Connor
29	July 21	Langhorne Race	20 mi (32 km)	Langhorne Speedway	Langhorne, Pennsylvania	Dirt Oval	Big Car	George Robson
30	July 21	Selinsgrove Race	10 mi (16 km)	Selinsgrove Speedway	Selinsgrove, Pennsylvania	Dirt Oval	Big Car	Bill Holland
31	July 27	Harrington Race	10 mi (16 km)	Delaware State Fairgrounds	Harrington, Delaware	Dirt Oval	Big Car	Ted Horn
32	July 28	Williams Grove Race	15 mi (24 km)	Williams Grove Speedway	Mechanicsburg, Pennsylvania	Dirt Oval	Big Car	Ted Horn
33	August 3	Washington Race	10 mi (16 km)	Arden Downs	Washington, Pennsylvania	Dirt Oval	Big Car	Bill Holland
34	August 4	Powell Race	7.5 mi (12.1 km)	Powell Motor Speedway	Powell, Ohio	Dirt Oval	Big Car	George Robson
35	August 10	Batavia Race	10 mi (16 km)	Batavia Fairgrounds	Batavia, New York	Dirt Oval	Big Car	Bill Holland
36	August 11	Bedford Race	10 mi (16 km)	Bedford Speedway	Bedford, Pennsylvania	Dirt Oval	Big Car	Ted Horn
37	August 11	Langhorne Race	20 mi (32 km)	Langhorne Speedway	Langhorne, Pennsylvania	Dirt Oval	Big Car	George Robson
38	August 11	Winchester Race	10 mi (16 km)	Winchester Speedway	Winchester, Indiana	Dirt Oval	Big Car	Elbert Booker
39	August 18	Skowhegan Race	10 mi (16 km)	Skowhegan Fairgrounds	Skowhegan, Maine	Dirt Oval	Big Car	Ted Horn
40	August 18	Williams Grove Race	15 mi (24 km)	Williams Grove Speedway	Mechanicsburg, Pennsylvania	Dirt Oval	Big Car	George Robson
41	August 24	Hamburg Race	10 mi (16 km)	Hamburg Fairgrounds	Hamburg, New York	Dirt Oval	Big Car	Ted Horn
42	August 25	Dayton Race	10 mi (16 km)	Dayton Speedway	Dayton, Ohio	Dirt Oval	Big Car	George Robson
43	August 25	Uniontown Race	10 mi (16 km)	Uniontown Speedway	Uniontown, Pennsylvania	Dirt Oval	Big Car	Ted Horn
44	August 30	Essex Junction Race	10 mi (16 km)	Essex Junction Fairgrounds	Essex Junction, Vermont	Dirt Oval	Big Car	Bill Holland
45	August 31	Altamont Race	10 mi (16 km)	Altamont Speedway	Altamont, New York	Dirt Oval	Big Car	Ted Horn
46	August 31	Hamburg Race	10 mi (16 km)	Hamburg Fairgrounds	Hamburg, New York	Dirt Oval	Big Car	Bill Holland
47	September 1	Flemington Race	10 mi (16 km)	Flemington Speedway	Flemington, New Jersey	Dirt Oval	Big Car	Bill Holland
48	September 1	Winchester Race	10 mi (16 km)	Winchester Speedway	Winchester, Indiana	Dirt Oval	Big Car	Charles Van Acker
49	September 2	Flemington Race	10 mi (16 km)	Flemington Speedway	Flemington, New Jersey	Dirt Oval	Big Car	Bill Holland
50	September 2	Atlanta 100	98 mi (158 km)^{A}	Lakewood Speedway	Atlanta, Georgia	Dirt Oval	Champ Car	George Connor
NC	September 2	Pikes Peak Auto Hill Climb	12.42 mi (19.99 km)	Pikes Peak Highway	Pikes Peak, Colorado	Hill Climb	Champ Car	Louis Unser
51	September 6	Rutland Race	10 mi (16 km)	Vermont State Fairgrounds	Rutland, Vermont	Dirt Oval	Big Car	Lee Wallard
52	September 7	Port Royal Race	8 mi (13 km)	Port Royal Speedway	Port Royal, Pennsylvania	Dirt Oval	Big Car	Ted Horn
53	September 8	Williams Grove Race	15 mi (24 km)	Williams Grove Speedway	Mechanicsburg, Pennsylvania	Dirt Oval	Big Car	Ted Horn
54	September 15	Indianapolis 100	100 mi (160 km)	Indiana State Fairgrounds	Indianapolis, Indiana	Dirt Oval	Champ Car	Rex Mays
55	September 15	Reading Race	12.5 mi (20.1 km)	Reading Fairgrounds Speedway	Reading, Pennsylvania	Dirt Oval	Big Car	Bill Holland
56	September 21	Allentown Fair Race	10 mi (16 km)	Allentown Fairgrounds	Allentown, Pennsylvania	Dirt Oval	Big Car	Bill Holland
57	September 22	Great Barrington Race	4 mi (6.4 km)	Great Barrington Race Track	Great Barrington, Massachusetts	Dirt Oval	Big Car	Joie Chitwood
58	September 22	Milwaukee 100	100 mi (160 km)	Wisconsin State Fair Park Speedway	West Allis, Wisconsin	Dirt Oval	Champ Car	Rex Mays
59	September 22	Powell Race	5 mi (8.0 km)	Powell Motor Speedway	Powell, Ohio	Dirt Oval	Big Car	Bill Holland
60	September 28	Bloomsburg Race	10 mi (16 km)	Bloomsburg Fairgrounds	Bloomsburg, Pennsylvania	Dirt Oval	Big Car	Bill Holland
61	September 28	Lakewood Race	20 mi (32 km)	Lakewood Speedway	Atlanta, Georgia	Dirt Oval	Big Car	Ted Horn
62	September 28	Shelby Race	10 mi (16 km)	Shelby Motor Speedway	Shelby, North Carolina	Dirt Oval	Big Car	Walt Ader
63	September 29	Trenton Race	20 mi (32 km)	Trenton International Speedway	Trenton, New Jersey	Dirt Oval	Big Car	Joie Chitwood
64	October 5	Lakewood Race	20 mi (32 km)	Lakewood Speedway	Atlanta, Georgia	Dirt Oval	Big Car	Bill Holland
65	October 5	Winston-Salem Race	10 mi (16 km)	Winston-Salem Fairgrounds	Winston-Salem, North Carolina	Dirt Oval	Big Car	Tommy Hinnershitz
66	October 6	Dayton Race	10 mi (16 km)	Dayton Speedway	Dayton, Ohio	Dirt Oval	Big Car	Hal Robson
67	October 6	George Robson Memorial	100 mi (160 km)	Good Time Park	Goshen, New York	Dirt Oval	Champ Car	Tony Bettenhausen
68	October 6	Greensboro Race	10 mi (16 km)	Greensboro Agricultural Fairgrounds	Greensboro, North Carolina	Dirt Oval	Big Car	Bill Holland
69	October 6	George Robson Memorial	15 mi (24 km)	Williams Grove Speedway	Mechanicsburg, Pennsylvania	Dirt Oval	Big Car	Lucky Lux
70	October 12	Charlotte Race	10 mi (16 km)	Charlotte Fairgrounds	Charlotte, North Carolina	Dirt Oval	Big Car	Bill Holland
71	October 12	Atlantic Rural Exposition	10 mi (16 km)	Strawberry Hill Raceway	Richmond, Virginia	Dirt Oval	Big Car	Ted Horn
72	October 12	Greensboro Race	7.5 mi (12.1 km)	Greensboro Agricultural Fairgrounds	Greensboro, North Carolina	Dirt Oval	Big Car	Bill Holland
73	October 19	Raleigh Race	10 mi (16 km)	State Fair Speedway	Raleigh, North Carolina	Dirt Oval	Big Car	Walt Ader
74	October 26	Charlotte Race	10 mi (16 km)	Charlotte Fairgrounds	Charlotte, North Carolina	Dirt Oval	Big Car	Hank Rogers
75	October 26	National Championship Trophy Race	25 mi (40 km)	Williams Grove Speedway	Mechanicsburg, Pennsylvania	Dirt Oval	Big Car	Bill Holland
76	November 9	Shelby Race	15 mi (24 km)	Shelby Motor Speedway	Shelby, North Carolina	Dirt Oval	Big Car	Ted Horn
77	November 10	Richmond Race	12.5 mi (20.1 km)	Strawberry Hill Raceway	Richmond, Virginia	Dirt Oval	Big Car	Tommy Hinnershitz

^A Scheduled for 100 miles, stopped early due to fatal accident involving George Robson and George Barringer. Ted Horn was leading at the time of the accident, but after a protest, was found to have been involved in the accident and had his win stripped.

Note: Bill Holland started on the pole position in the Lakewood Race on July 4 and Ted Horn started on the pole position in the DuBois Race on July 20.

== Leading National Championship standings ==
#	Driver	Team	Points
1	Ted Horn	Ted Horn Engineering, Boyle, Peters	2448
2	George Robson†	Thorne Engineering, Christie, Weirick	1544
3	Emil Andres	Elgin Piston Pin, Riverside Tire, Nyquist	1348
4	Bill Holland	Malamud	1280
5	Tommy Hinnershitz	Ted Horn Engineering	896.8

† Robson was killed in the race at Lakewood Speedway on September 2

=== Points system ===
Position/ Miles	1	2	3	4	5	6	7	8	9	10	11	12
4	8	6	4	3	—	—	—	—	—	—	—	—
5	10	8	6	4	—	—	—	—	—	—	—	—
7.5	15	12	9	6	—	—	—	—	—	—	—	—
8	16	13	10	6	—	—	—	—	—	—	—	—
10	20	16	12	8	4	2	—	—	—	—	—	—
12.5	25	20	15	10	5	2.5	—	—	—	—	—	—
15	30	24	18	12	6	3	—	—	—	—	—	—
17.5	35	28	21	14	9	5.5	—	—	—	—	—	—
20	40	32	24	16	12	8	—	—	—	—	—	—
25	50	40	30	25	20	10	5	—	—	—	—	—
50	100	80	70	60	50	40	30	20	10	5	—	—
100	200	160	140	120	100	80	60	50	40	30	20	10
500	1000	800	700	600	500	400	300	250	200	150	100	50

== Alternate schedule and results ==
The official IndyCar Series Historical Record Book (2011) listed only the six "Champ Car" in the schedule. (page 72)

Rnd	Date	Race name	Length	Track	Location	Type	Pole position	Winning driver
1	May 30	(United States) International 500 Mile Sweepstakes	500 mi (800 km)	Indianapolis Motor Speedway	Speedway, Indiana	Paved	(United States) Cliff Bergere	(United States) George Robson
2	June 30	(United States) Langhorne 100	100 mi (160 km)	Langhorne Speedway	Langhorne, Pennsylvania	Dirt	(United States) Ted Horn	(United States) Rex Mays
3	September 2	(United States) Atlanta 100	98 mi (158 km)^{A}	Lakewood Speedway	Atlanta, Georgia	Dirt	(United States) Rex Mays	(United States) George Connor
NC	September 2	(United States) Pikes Peak Auto Hill Climb	12.42 mi (19.99 km)	Pikes Peak Highway	Pikes Peak, Colorado	Hill	(United States) Louis Unser^{B}	(United States) Louis Unser
4	September 15	(United States) Indianapolis 100	100 mi (160 km)	Indiana State Fairgrounds	Indianapolis, Indiana	Dirt	(United States) Rex Mays	(United States) Rex Mays
5	September 22	(United States) Milwaukee 100	100 mi (160 km)	Wisconsin State Fair Park Speedway	West Allis, Wisconsin	Dirt	(United States) Rex Mays	(United States) Rex Mays
6	October 6	(United States) George Robson Memorial	100 mi (160 km)	Good Time Park	Goshen, New York	Dirt	(United States) Emil Andres	(United States) Tony Bettenhausen

Paved/Dirt Oval
Road Course/Hill Climb
Non-championship race

^A Scheduled for 100 miles, stopped early due to fatal accident involving George Robson and George Barringer. Ted Horn was leading at the time of the accident, but after a protest, was found to have been involved in the accident and had his win stripped.
^B No pole is awarded for the Pikes Peak Hill Climb, in this schedule on the pole is the driver who started first. No lap led was awarded for the Pikes Peak Hill Climb, however, a lap was awarded to the drivers that completed the climb.

== Final points standings ==
Pos	Driver	INDY (United States)	LHS (United States)	LAK (United States)	ISF (United States)	MIL (United States)	GOT (United States)	Pts
1	(United States) Ted Horn	3	**3**	6	4	2	2	1360
2	(United States) Emil Andres	4	4	3	3	3	**4**	1260
3	(United States) George Robson	1	2	7				1220
4	(United States) Jimmy Jackson RY	2						800
5	(United States) Rex Mays	30	1	**11**	**1**	**1**	DNQ	620
6	(United States) Louis Durant	6	DNS					400
7	(United States) Joie Chitwood	5	DNP					372
8	(United States) George Connor	24	9	1	7	10	9	370
9	(United States) Tony Bettenhausen	20	DNP		5	9	1	340
10	(United States) Duke Dinsmore R	17		10	11	4	3	310
11	(Italy) Luigi Villoresi R	7						300
12	(United States) Billy Devore	10	5	9				290
13	(United States) Frank Wearne	8						250
14	(United States) Mauri Rose	23	12		2	6	DNP	240
15	(United States) Steve Truchan R	DNQ	DNP	2	9			200
16	(United States) Charlie Rogers R				DNS	5	5	200
17	(United States) Bill Sheffler R	9	DNP					200
18	(United States) Bud Bardowski R	DNS		4	13	12	10	160
19	(United States) Joe Langley R	DNQ		5	14			100
20	(United States) Mel Hansen	11	DNP					100
21	(United States) Buddy Rusch R	DNQ	6					80
22	(United States) Floyd Davis				6			80
23	(United States) Eddie Casterline						6	80
24	(United States) Spider Webb				10	8	DNP	80
25	(United States) Elbert Booker R		DNP		12	7	DNP	70
26	(United States) George Metzler R					11	8	70
27	(United States) Walt Brown		7					60
28	(United States) Fred Carpenter R						7	60
29	(United States) Al Miller	DNQ			8	14	DNP	50
30	(United States) Hal Robson	25	8					50
31	(United States) George Barringer	29	DNP	8				50
32	(United States) Russ Snowberger	12	DNP		DNS		DNP	39
33	(United States) Danny Goss R		10					30
-	(United States) Lee Wallard		11					0
-	(United States) Harry McQuinn	13						0
-	(United States) Walt Ader R					13		0
-	(United States) Ralph Hepburn	14						0
-	(United States) Al Putnam	15			DNQ			0
-	(United States) Cliff Bergere	**16**						0
-	(United States) Chet Miller	18						0
-	(United States) Jimmy Wilburn R	19						0
-	(United States) Danny Kladis R	21						0
-	(United States) Duke Nalon	22	DNP					0
-	(United States) Louis Tomei	26						0
-	(United States) Henry Banks	27	DNS					0
-	(United States) Shorty Cantlon	28						0
-	(United States) Sam Hanks	31						0
-	(United States) Hal Cole R	32						0
-	(United States) Paul Russo	33						0
-	(United States) Eddie Zalucki R	DNS						0
-	(United States) Zora Arkus-Duntov	DNQ					DNQ	0
-	(United States) Charles Van Acker	DNQ	DNP					0
-	(United Kingdom) Robert Arbuthnot	DNQ						0
-	(United States) Harold Bailey	DNQ						0
-	(United States) Gerald Brisko	DNQ						0
-	(United States) Jim Brubaker	DNQ						0
-	(United States) Arvol Brunmeier	DNQ						0
-	(Germany) Rudolf Caracciola	DNQ						0
-	(United States) Bruce Denslow	DNQ						0
-	(France) Louis Gérard	DNQ						0
-	(United States) Tommy Hinnershitz	DNQ						0
-	(United States) Wally Mitchell	DNQ						0
-	(United States) Frank McGurk	DNQ						0
-	(United States) Ray Richards	DNQ						0
-	(United States) Bud Rose	DNQ						0
-	(United States) Harry Schell	DNQ						0
-	(United States) Joel Thorne	DNQ						0
-	(Italy) Achille Varzi	DNQ						0
-	(United States) Bus Wilbert	DNQ						0
-	(United States) Doc Williams	DNQ						0
-	(United States) Freddie Winnai	DNQ						0
-	(United States) Charles Crawford	DNP						0
-	(Italy) Dioscoride Lanza	DNP						0
-	(United States) Joe Silvia	DNP						0
-	(France) Raphaël Bethenod	DNP						0
Pos	Driver	INDY (United States)	LHS (United States)	LAK (United States)	ISF (United States)	MIL (United States)	GOT (United States)	Pts

Color	Result
Gold	Winner
Silver	2nd place
Bronze	3rd place
Green	4th & 5th place
Light Blue	6th-10th place
Dark Blue	Finished (Outside Top 10)
Purple	Did not finish (Ret)
Red	Did not qualify (DNQ)
Brown	Withdrawn (Wth)
Black	Disqualified (DSQ)
White	Did not start (DNS)
Blank	Did not participate (DNP)
Blank	Not competing

**In-line notation**
**Bold**	Pole position
Italics	Ran fastest race lap
*	Led most race laps
RY Rookie of the Year
R Rookie

Note: The points became the car, when not only one driver led the car, the relieved driver became small part of the points. Points for driver method: (the points for the finish place) / (number the lap when completed the car) * (number the lap when completed the driver)

== See also ==
- 1946 Indianapolis 500
