= Lucky Lux =

American racing driver (1919–1956)

- Born: Harold Eugene Lux; December 10, 1919 Avon, Pennsylvania, U.S.
- Died: October 2, 1956 (aged 36) Kennett Township, Pennsylvania, U.S.

Champ Car career
- 6+ races run over 1 year
- Best finish: 40th (1946)
- First race: 1946 Williams Grove Race #4 (Mechanicsburg)
- Last race: 1946 Williams Grove Race #10 (Mechanicsburg)
- First win: 1946 George Robson Memorial (Mechanicsburg)
| Wins | Podiums | Poles |
|---|---|---|
| 1 | 1 | 0 |

Harold Eugene "Lucky" Lux (December 10, 1919 – October 2, 1956) was an American racing driver. He competed in big car races that populated the anomalous American Automobile Association (AAA) sanctioned National Championship in 1946. Lux won the 69th race of the season held at Williams Grove Speedway - a memorial race honoring George Robson, the 1946 Indianapolis 500 winner who had been killed in an accident mid-season. After taking the lead on the second lap, Lux led the remained of the event, taking his only career victory in a national event.

Lux died on October 2, 1956, after the tractor-trailer he was operating lost control and overturned.
