= Lost Speedways =

Television documentary series

- Genre: Television documentary
- Starring: Dale Earnhardt Jr.; Matthew Dillner
- Country of origin: United States
- Original language: English
- No. of seasons: 2
- No. of episodes: 16

Production
- Executive producer: Dale Earnhardt Jr.
- Producer: Dirty Mo Media
- Running time: 24–28 minutes

Original release
- Network: Peacock
- Release: July 15, 2020 – July 1, 2021

Lost Speedways is a television documentary series produced by Peacock. The series is hosted by Dale Earnhardt Jr. as he travels to abandoned racetracks across the United States. Eight episodes were produced as part of the first season and were released on July 15, 2020. An eight-episode second season was released on July 1, 2021.

== Episodes ==
| Season | Episodes | Originally released |
|---|---|---|
| 1 | 8 | July 15, 2020 |
| 2 | 8 | July 1, 2021 |

=== Season 1 (2020) ===
| No. overall | No. in season | Title | Original release date |
|---|---|---|---|
| 1 | 1 | "Earnhardt Proving Grounds" | July 15, 2020 |
Earnhardt visits Metrolina Speedway.
| 2 | 2 | "In the Still of the Night" | July 15, 2020 |
Earnhardt's team visits Middle Georgia Raceway.
| 3 | 3 | "Animal House" | July 15, 2020 |
Earnhardt visits New Asheville Speedway.
| 4 | 4 | "Fireball's Forgetten Georgia Giant" | July 15, 2020 |
Earnhardt's team visits Augusta International Raceway, a multi-use motorsports facility designed by Fireball Roberts.
| 5 | 5 | "Concrete Palace on the Passaic" | July 15, 2020 |
Earnhardt's team visits Hinchliffe Stadium.
| 6 | 6 | "Fit for a King" | July 15, 2020 |
Earnhardt visits Occoneechee Speedway with Richard Petty.
| 7 | 7 | "Danger Zone" | July 15, 2020 |
Earnhardt's team visits Jungle Park Speedway.
| 8 | 8 | "Home Treasures" | July 15, 2020 |
Earnhardt gives a tour of his home property, showcasing his racecar graveyard and telling stories from an old dirt track he used to operate in his backyard, which he refers to as "Dirty Mo Speedway."

=== Season 2 (2021) ===
| No. overall | No. in season | Title | Original release date |
|---|---|---|---|
| 9 | 1 | "Daytona Beach and Road Course: Origins" | July 1, 2021 |
Earnhardt visits the Daytona Beach and Road Course.
| 10 | 2 | "Pennsboro Speedway: The Miracle" | July 1, 2021 |
Earnhardt visits Pennsboro Speedway.
| 11 | 3 | "San Antonio Speedway: Bad Blood in the Land of the Alamo" | July 1, 2021 |
Earnhardt's team visits San Antonio Speedway.
| 12 | 4 | "Columbia Speedway: Engine Wars" | July 1, 2021 |
Earnhardt visits Columbia Speedway.
| 13 | 5 | "Texas World Speedway: Lonely Star" | July 1, 2021 |
Earnhardt visits Texas World Speedway.
| 14 | 6 | "Arundel Speedway: Ultimate Badass" | July 1, 2021 |
Earnhardt's team visits Arundel Speedway.
| 15 | 7 | "Cleveland County Fairgrounds: Conspiracy or Coincidence?" | July 1, 2021 |
Earnhardt visits Cleveland County Fairgrounds Speedway.
| 16 | 8 | "Myrtle Beach Speedway: Goodbye, Dear Friend" | July 1, 2021 |
Earnhardt visits Myrtle Beach Speedway.
