= Joe Verebly =

American racing driver (1914–1996)

- Born: Joseph John Verebly; April 6, 1914 Perth Amboy, New Jersey, U.S.
- Died: September 4, 1996 (aged 82) Somerville, New Jersey, U.S.

Champ Car career
- 5+ races run over 1 year
- Best finish: 46th (1946)
- First race: 1946 Williams Grove Race #3 (Mechanicsburg)
- Last race: 1946 Williams Grove Race #5 (Mechanicsburg)
- First win: 1946 Thompson Race #3 (Thompson)
Wins	Podiums	Poles
1	2	0

Joseph John Verebly (April 6, 1914 – September 4, 1996) was an American racing driver. He competed in several big car races that populated the anomalous American Automobile Association (AAA) sanctioned National Championship in 1946.
