= Bumpy Bumpus =

American racing driver (1914–1946)

- Born: Howard Leslie Bumpus; May 4, 1914 Brockton, Massachusetts, U.S.
- Died: June 16, 1946 (aged 32) Flemington, New Jersey, U.S.

Champ Car career
- 2+ races run over 1 year
- Best finish: unknown (1946)
- First race: 1946 Altamont Race #1 (Altamont)
- Last race: 1946 Williams Grove Race #4 (Mechanicsburg)
- First win: 1946 Altamont Race #1 (Altamont)
Wins	Podiums	Poles
1	1	1

Howard Leslie "Bumpy" Bumpus (May 4, 1914 – June 16, 1946) was an American racing driver from Brockton, Massachusetts. Bumpus began racing in the late 1930s.

== Life ==
In the middle of a 1940 race, Bumpus drove through a fence; he then walked out of the wreckage, assured the audience he was okay, and won a subsequent race in a borrowed car. In a 1936 racing event, Bumpus first crashed into two stalled cars and then crashed into a clump of bushes.

Bumpus was described as a fan favorite. He competed in big car races that populated the anomalous American Automobile Association (AAA) sanctioned National Championship in 1946. In June 1946, he sought to end a streak of mid-race mechanical errors. Bumpus died after crashing, either because of swerving to avoid hitting another car, or flipping due to striking the rear wheel of the race leader, during a heat race at Flemington Speedway, the 14th race of the 1946 AAA season.
