= Johnny Shackleford =

American racing driver (1913–1948)

- Born: John Henry Shackleford Jr. November 24, 1913 Dayton, Ohio, U.S.
- Died: June 14, 1948 (aged 34) Dayton, Ohio, U.S.

Champ Car career
- 14+ races run over 3 years
- Best finish: 17th (1946)
- First race: 1946 Williams Grove Race #3 (Mechanicsburg)
- Last race: 1948 Milwaukee 100 (Milwaukee)
- First win: 1946 Trenton Race #2 (Trenton)
- Last win: 1946 Williams Grove Race #5 (Mechanicsburg)
Wins	Podiums	Poles
2	2	0

John Henry Shackleford Jr. (November 24, 1913 – June 14, 1948) was an American racing driver. He competed in big car races that populated the anomalous American Automobile Association (AAA) sanctioned National Championship in 1946. He also drove relief for Joie Chitwood during the 1948 Indianapolis 500. He died in an accident during a race at Dayton Speedway.
