= Bromme =

Racing car constructor

Bromme was a racing car constructor who competed in the FIA World Championship (Indy 500 only) from 1951 to 1954.

In the 1951 Formula One season, Bromme finished in 27th with Rodger Ward as the driver.

== World Championship Indy 500 results ==
Season	Driver	Grid	Classification	Points	Note	Race Report
1951	Rodger Ward	27	Ret		Oil Pipe	Report
1952	Spider Webb	29	Ret		Oil Leak	Report
1953	Bob Scott	11	Ret		Oil Leak	Report
1954	Spider Webb	29	Ret		Fuel Pump	Report
