= Bedford Speedway =

5/8 mile race track located in Bedford County

Bedford Fairgrounds Speedway
- Location: Bedford Township, Bedford County, Pennsylvania, United States
- Coordinates: 40.024°N 78.520°W
- Owner: Bedford County Fairgrounds
- Opened: September 4, 1936
- Major events: All Star Circuit of Champions; World of Outlaws Late Model Series; American Automobile Association

Oval
- Surface: Clay
- Length: 0.62 mi (1 km)

Bedford Speedway is a 5/8 mile (1 km) oval, semi-banked, clay, race track located in Bedford County, near Bedford, Pennsylvania, United States. The track is also known as the Bedford Fairgrounds Speedway and is host to the Great Bedford County Fair. The track hosts the All Star Circuit of Champions, World of Outlaws Late Model Series.

== History ==
Bedford Speedway held its first racing event on September 4, 1936 during the Great Bedford Fair and continues to operate as the oldest active dirt speedway in Pennsylvania. Competitors at the track include Indy 500 winners Bill Holland, Jimmy Bryan, and Mario Andretti. The track held a single race each year at the annual fair until the 1960s. The track held an annual American Automobile Association (AAA) "big car" (now sprint car) race until the AAA stopped sanctioning in 1955.

During the winter of 2007, the speedway was resurfaced with sifted clay. Joe Padula III took over track promotion in 2013. The track added United Midwestern Promoters (UMP) Modifieds class in 2019.

== Racing Program ==
Racing takes place on Friday nights from April through September. Weekly classes include Late Models, Late Model Sportsman, Modifieds, and Semi Lates.

Special events include the Lucas Oil Late Model Dirt Series, World of Outlaws Late Model Series, Mid-Atlantic Championship Series, Independent Racing Series, All Star Circuit of Champions, PA Posse sprint cars, and the American Motorcycle Association Flat Track Championship.
