= Elbert Booker =

American racing driver (1903–1947)

- Born: Elbert Edward Booker; June 12, 1903 Murray, Kentucky, U.S.
- Died: June 15, 1947 (aged 44) Dayton, Ohio, U.S.

Champ Car career
- 10+ races run over 1 year
- Best finish: 21st (1946)
- First race: 1946 Dayton Race #1 (Dayton)
- Last race: 1946 Milwaukee 100 (Milwaukee)
- First win: 1946 Dayton Race #1 (Dayton)
- Last win: 1946 Winchester Race #3 (Winchester)
Wins	Podiums	Poles
2	5	0

Elbert Edward Booker (June 12, 1903 – June 15, 1947) was an American racing driver from Detroit, Michigan. He competed in big car races that populated the anomalous American Automobile Association (AAA) sanctioned National Championship in 1946. He died in an accident during a race at Dayton Speedway.
