= Oscar Ridlon =

American racing driver (1905–1973)

- Born: Oscar Gould Ridlon; August 6, 1905 Princeton, Massachusetts, U.S.
- Died: July 29, 1973 (aged 67) Lawrence, Massachusetts, U.S.

Champ Car career
- 3+ races run over 1 year
- Best finish: 52nd (1946)
- First race: 1946 Thompson Race #1 (Thompson)
- Last race: 1946 Thompson Race #3 (Thompson)
- First win: 1946 Thompson Race #1 (Thompson)
- Last win: 1946 Thompson Race #2 (Thompson)
Wins	Podiums	Poles
2	2	0

Oscar Gould Ridlon (August 6, 1905 – July 29, 1973) was an American racing driver. Primarily competing in midgets, he also competed in several big car races that populated the anomalous American Automobile Association (AAA) sanctioned National Championship in 1946. After his racing career, Ridlon worked as a promoter of modified racing in Maine and Massachusetts.
