= Travis Webb =

American racing driver (1910–1990)

Spider Webb
- Born: Travis Leon Webb; October 8, 1910 Joplin, Missouri, U.S.
- Died: January 27, 1990 (aged 79) McMinnville, Oregon, U.S.

Champ Car career
- 24+ races run over 10 years
- Best finish: 17th (tie) (1949)
- First race: 1939 Milwaukee 100 (Milwaukee)
- Last race: 1954 Indianapolis 500 (Indianapolis)
Wins	Podiums	Poles
0	4	1

Formula One World Championship career
- Active years: 1950, 1952–1955
- Team(s): Maserati, Bromme, Kurtis Kraft
- Entries: 5 (4 starts)
- Championships: 0
- Wins: 0
- Podiums: 0
- Career points: 0
- Pole positions: 0
- Fastest laps: 0
- First entry: 1950 Indianapolis 500
- Last entry: 1955 Indianapolis 500

Travis Leon "Spider" Webb (October 8, 1910 – January 27, 1990) was an American racing driver. He was the 1948 American Automobile Association (AAA) Midwest Sprint Car champion. He raced in numerous AAA Championship Car races including six Indianapolis 500s.

Known as "Spider", Webb transported a portable bar in the trunk of his car at all times and was known for his free spirit and his humor.

== Early life ==
Webb was born in Joplin, Missouri. His father made cabinets. Webb's parents moved the family to Los Angeles, California in 1923.

== Racing career ==
Webb began racing on the Muroc Dry Lake (now known as Rogers Dry Lake) in 1928. His car owner gave him the nickname "Spider".

Webb decided to stop racing on the long straightaways and decided to focus on dirt oval racing of Southern California. One of the tracks that he raced was Legion Ascot Speedway, where he raced in the "B" class.

=== Sprint car career ===
In 1936, Webb and Jimmy Wilburn were offered rides in "Big Cars" in the Central States Racing Association (CSRA). Both accepted and moved to Indianapolis. Webb won the final CSRA race of the 1938 season at Winchester Speedway. Webb switched from the CSRA to the American Automobile Association (AAA) Midwest series in 1941 and finished fourth in the season points.

Racing was halted during World War II. In late 1947, Webb won three straight AAA Midwest races at Dayton Speedway, Salem Speedway, and Winchester. He won another race at Salem and finished second in 1947 AAA Midwest points to Johnny Shackleford. Webb started the 1948 season by winning seven times and finishing second in the first eight races. He missed a few races that season while running a Champ Car but still won the AAA Midwest championship. Webb started the 1949 season with a new sprint car that he co-owned; by June he had moved back to a car owned by Johnny Vance. He had a second-place finish at Michigan State Fairgrounds Speedway in Detroit and a third at the Syracuse Mile; he finished third in the final AAA Midwest points.

Webb finished fifth in the 1950 AAA Midwest points. After the racing season was over, he had a thumb injury at his friend's shop and had to sit out the entire 1951 season.

=== Championship car career ===
In 1939, Webb made a one-off American Automobile Association (AAA) Champ Car start at the Milwaukee Mile; he started last in the 17 car field and finished seventh. Webb made two Champ Car starts in 1946; he finished tenth at the Indiana State Fairgrounds and eighth at Milwaukee. Webb was offered a ride from Mutt Anderson into the 1948 Indianapolis 500 but did not qualify. At the last minute, he was offered another ride and qualified the Bromme dirt champ car 30th. His race ended early after an oil line failure; he finished 27th after completing 27 of 200 laps. Webb qualified 26th for the 1949 Indianapolis 500 but finished last (33rd) after he transmission broke before he could complete one lap. He switched to a car owned by Charles Bowes starting with the ninth race of the 1949 season after Mel Hansen was unable to race. Webb started on the pole position for Syracuse race before finishing third. He finished second at Detroit and eighth at Illinois State Fairgrounds Racetrack (Springfield Mile).

Webb finished the 1950 Indianapolis 500 in 20th place after the race was shorted due to rain on lap 138. He did not qualify for four races and finished 18th in his only other Champ Car race at Springfield. Webb got bumped out of the field for the 1952 Indianapolis 500 but made the field in a last-minute qualifying attempt for Bromme. He finished 22nd after having to retire with an oil leak late in the race. In the 1953 Indianapolis 500, he started 29th and finished 22nd. He did not qualify for five events and finished 15th in the event that he did qualify (Springfield). Bromme called Webb in another last-minute deal for the 1954 Indianapolis 500; he qualified 29th and finishing 30th. Webb failed to qualify for the 1955 Indianapolis 500.

=== World Drivers' Championship career ===
The AAA/USAC-sanctioned Indianapolis 500 was included in the FIA World Drivers' Championship from 1950 through 1960. Drivers competing at Indianapolis during those years were credited with World Drivers' Championship participation, and were eligible to score WDC points alongside those which they may have scored towards the AAA/USAC National Championship.

Webb participated in four World Drivers' Championship races at Indianapolis. His best finish was 19th place, and he scored no World Drivers' Championship points.

== Post racing career ==
After retiring from racing, Webb moved to Norwalk, California. He purchased earthmoving equipment and worked on the Los Angeles Zoo construction. He died at the age of 79 in McMinnville, Oregon.

== Awards and honors ==
- Webb was inducted in the National Sprint Car Hall of Fame in 1997.

== Motorsports career results ==
=== Indianapolis 500 results ===
Year	Car	Start	Qual	Rank	Finish	Laps	Led	Retired	Chassis	Engine
1948	51	30	125.545	12	27	27	0	Oil line	Bromme	Offy
1949	37	26	127.002	26	33	0	0	Transmission	Bromme	Offy
1950	21	14	129.748	26	20	126	0	Flagged	Maserati	Offy
1952	48	29	135.962	11	22	162	0	Oil Leak	Bromme	Offy
1953	62	18	136.168	17	19	166	0	Oil Leak	Kurtis Kraft	Offy
1954	65	29	137.979	26	30	104	0	Oil leak	Bromme	Offy
Totals						585	0			

Starts	6
Poles	0
Front Row	0
Wins	0
Top 5	0
Top 10	0
Retired	5
