= Bus Wilbert =

American racing driver (1915–1946)

- Born: Edward Clifford Wilbert Jr. September 2, 1915 Narrowsburg, New York, U.S.
- Died: August 11, 1946 (aged 30) Winchester, Indiana, U.S.

Champ Car career
- 8+ races run over 1 year
- Best finish: unknown (1946)
- First race: 1946 Winchester Race #1 (Winchester)
- Last race: 1946 Winchester Race #3 (Winchester)
- First win: 1946 Winchester Race #1 (Winchester)
- Last win: 1946 Dayton Race #2 (Dayton)
Wins	Podiums	Poles
3	3	0

Edward Clifford "Bus" Wilbert Jr. (September 2, 1915 – August 11, 1946) was an American racing driver. He was killed during a AAA Big Car event at Winchester Speedway.

== Career ==
Wilbert was a racer of both big cars and midgets. His first racing competition was in 1941, while previous to that he raced midget auto races. In 1941, he joined the U.S. Navy as a test pilot and flight instructor. He was a lieutenant and a combat pilot. He was a leading driver in the Consolidated Midget Racing Association and he won three AAA Championship races. He was part of the 1946 AAA Championship Car season.

== Death ==
On August 11, 1946, Wilbert's car skidded on the shoulder of a turn at Funk's Speedway (later to be called Winchester Speedway) in Winchester, New York. the car struck that of Eddie Zalecki, who lived. He was married and had a daughter.
