= Metrolina Speedway =

Race track in Charlotte, North Carolina

Coordinates: 35.319958°N 80.836051°W

- Location: 4916 Airway Avenue; Charlotte, North Carolina
- Opened: 1968
- Closed: 1998
- Former names: Charlotte Fairgrounds Speedway

Half Mile Oval
- Surface: Dirt
- Length: 0.500 mi (0.804 km)
- Turns: 4

Metrolina Speedway was an auto racing track built in 1968 in northeast Charlotte, North Carolina on the Metrolina Fairgrounds.

== History ==
The track, also known as Charlotte Fairgrounds Speedway', was 1/2 mile (.804 km) in length and had a clay surface. It was paved for a short time in the 1970s to allow the NASCAR circuit to hold races there. Many racers have raced at Metrolina Speedway, including Dale Earnhardt Sr., Brad Teague, and Harry Gant. It is one of many racetracks in the Metrolina region of North Carolina and South Carolina.

In 2009, plans were announced to reopen the track as the Metrolina Speed and Sport Center. The track was to be repaved and the plans included a Go-Kart track, outdoor RC racing track, a hotel, and roof-top skate park, but the proposal failed to move forward.

The track was the subject of the first episode of Lost Speedways on Peacock hosted by Dale Earnhardt Jr.

A FedEx logistics center now sits next to the site.
