= Keith Kauffman =

American racing driver

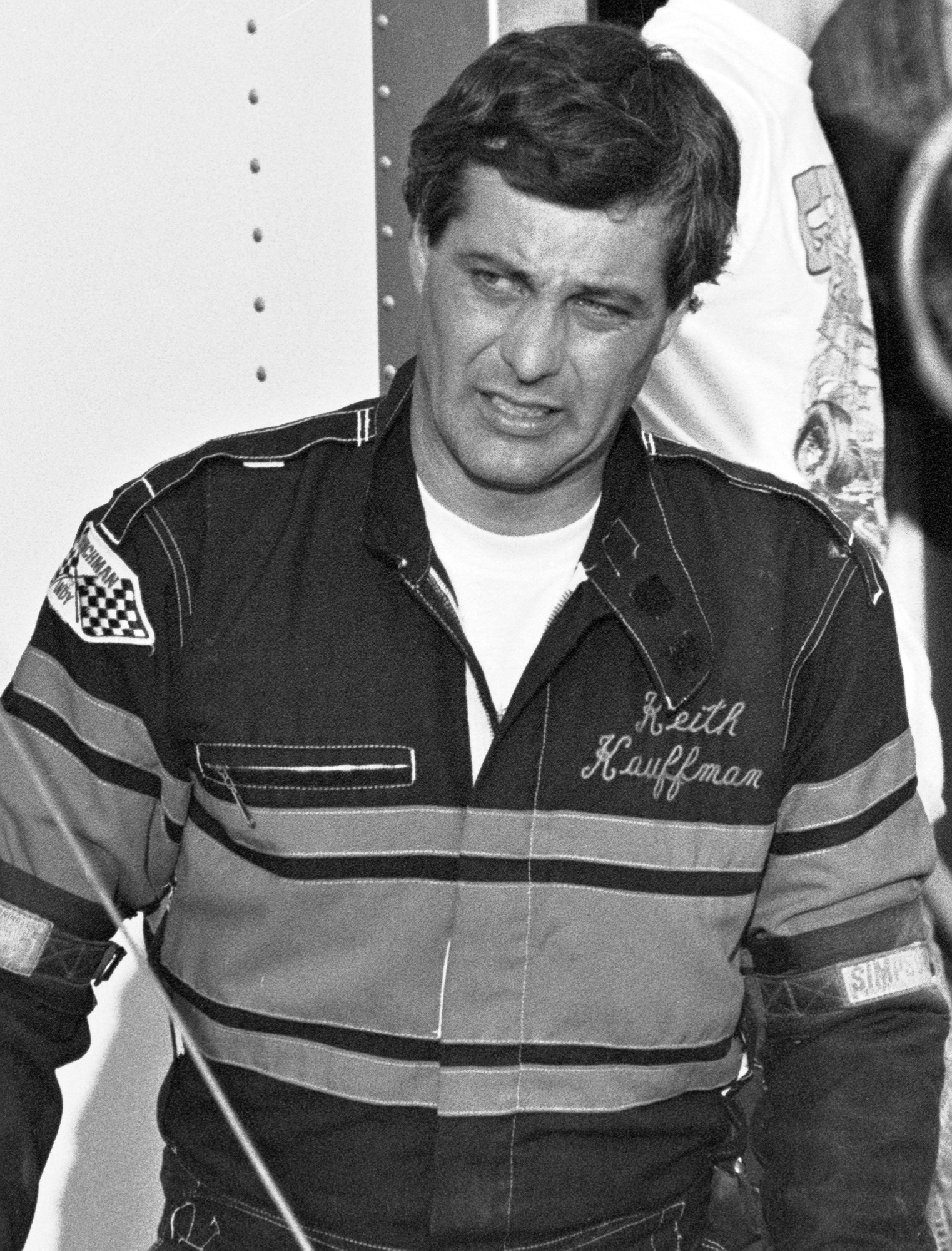
Kauffman

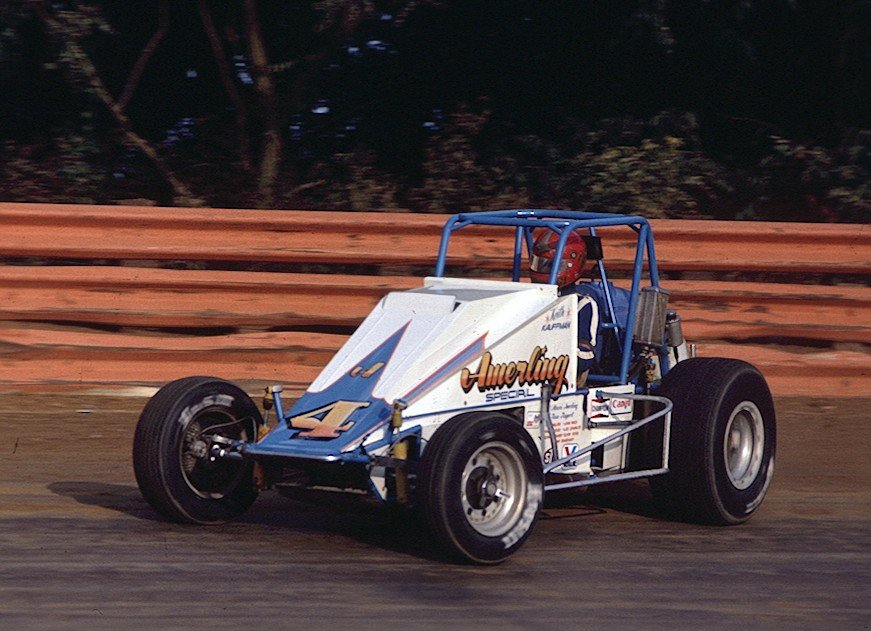
Kauffman racing a wingless sprint car in 1986

Keith Kauffman (born June 9, 1950) is a retired American race car driver. Over his career, he amassed 309 wins and 18 track championships. He won the 1982 USAC "Gold Crown" Nazareth 100. His only Championship Car experience was the three dirt races of the 1982 Gold Crown season. He was most well known for driving 410ci winged sprint cars in Pennsylvania and surrounding states. He was born in Danville, Pennsylvania, and was inducted into the National Sprint Car Hall of Fame in 2004 as a member of the "Pennsylvania Posse".

== Complete USAC Championship Car results ==
Year	1	2	3	4	Pos	Points
1982-83	SPR; 18	DUQ; 16	NAZ; 1	INDY	-	0
