= Tommy Hinnershitz =

American racing driver (1912–1999)

- Born: Thomas Paul Hinnershitz; April 6, 1912 Alsace Township, Pennsylvania, U.S.
- Died: August 1, 1999 (aged 87) Alsace Township, Pennsylvania, U.S.

Champ Car career
- 51+ races run over 14 years
- Best finish: 5th (1946)
- First race: 1938 Syracuse 100 (Syracuse)
- Last race: 1956 Bobby Ball Memorial (Phoenix)
- First win: 1946 Winston-Salem Race (Winston-Salem)
- Last win: 1946 Richmond Race #2 (Richmond)
Wins	Podiums	Poles
2	13	0

Thomas Paul Hinnershitz (April 6, 1912 – August 1, 1999) was an American racing driver. Hinnershitz was active through the 1930s, 1940s and 1950s on dirt, asphalt and boards, driving "big cars" (later known as sprint cars) – at that time slightly smaller versions of Indianapolis cars that could be raced on half-mile dirt race tracks.

During his 30-year career, Hinnershitz captured 103 American Automobile Association (AAA) and United States Auto Club (USAC) sanctioned victories, and won seven AAA/USAC East Coast sprint car championships (1949–1952, 1955–1956, and 1959). He also raced in national Championship car (30 AAA and four USAC) events.

Hinnershitz mainly raced his own cars (not for other owners), serving as his own mechanic. He was one of the first drivers to have car sponsorship. Hinnershitz was known for racing wearing overalls, which drew in fans at fairgrounds races in Corn Belt states such as Iowa and the Minnesota.

== Background and personal life ==
Thomas Paul Hinnershitz was born on a farm near Oley, Pennsylvania. He farmed a 63-acre (25 ha) farm on weekdays and raced on the weekend.

Hinnershitz married Betty Selmen in 1935. They had a daughter Jean in 1939 and a daughter Carol in 1943.

== Racing career ==
Hinnershitz began racing in 1930 with a 1914 Model T at Reading Fairgrounds Speedway. The car cost him $25; he won his first race and $75 earned for the victory. He later was quoted, "Boy, I was really rich then. That was the best investment I ever made in a race car." His early career saw successes at Williams Grove Speedway and Reading Fairgrounds Speedway near his home in Pennsylvania. He joined the AAA in 1932.

Hinnershitz raced his midget car with a boat outboard motor at the 1/6-mile, 45-degree Nutley, New Jersey, bicycle board track Velodrome in the late 1930s. Hinnershitz's passed his Indianapolis Motor Speedway test in 1939 but did not qualify for the race. He won the first feature at Williams Grove Speedway, a AAA Sprint car race.

Hinnershitz won the AAA Eastern Sprint Car championship in 1949, 1950, 1951, 1952, and 1955. AAA stopped sanctioning racing and USAC took over sanctioning for 1956. He won USAC Eastern Sprint Car championship in 1956 and 1959.

In the 1950s, Hinnershitz became one of the first drivers to have a car sponsor. He carried the Miracle Power fuel additive sponsorship while racing with an Offenhauser race engine.

== Retirement and life after racing ==
Hinnershitz retired from racing in 1960 three hours after witnessing his friend Johnny Thomson die at a Allentown Fairgrounds race in Pennsylvania. "I had been thinking about retiring for several weeks," Hinnershitz was quoted. "But I won't say what happened to John didn't help me make it definite. I quit for two reasons. One, I didn't approve of some of the new drivers and their driving philosophies. Two, my hands were gone. I simply couldn't grip the wheel well enough." He held 39 track records at his retirement. A. J. Foyt was quoted in his biography A.J.: "Of all the drivers on dirt Tommy Hinnershitz stands out in my mind as the best. Man, he had that sprint car up on two wheels, one wheel up on its side, whatever it took. And he almost never turned it over."

Hinnershitz continued to work in the racing field for several more years as an Indy car mechanic. He died on August 1, 1999.

== Nicknames ==
Hinnershitz was nicknamed "The Flying Dutchman", "The Flying Farmer", and the "Oley Dirt Farmer".

== Awards and honors ==
=== Career awards ===
- Hinnershitz was inducted into the Pennsylvania Sports Hall of Fame in 1975.
- Hinnershitz was inducted into the Eastern Motorsport Press Association Hall of Fame in 1975.
- Hinnershitz was inducted into the National Sprint Car Hall of Fame in the first class of 1990.
- Hinnershitz was inducted into the Motorsports Hall of Fame of America in 2003.
- Hinnershitz was inducted into the United States Auto Club Hall of Fame in 2016.

== Honors ==
- Williams Grove Speedway hosts the "Tommy Hinnershitz Classic," an All Star Circuit of Champions sprint car race as of 2019.

== Motorsports career results ==
=== Indianapolis 500 results ===
Year	Car	Start	Qual	Rank	Finish	Laps	Led	Retired
1940	27	9	122.614	17	32	32	0	Crash FS
1941	27	20	121.021	27	10	200	0	Running
1948	7	23	125.122	14	9	198	0	Flagged
Totals						430	0	

Starts	3
Poles	0
Front Row	0
Wins	0
Top 5	0
Top 10	2
Retired	1
