= Joie Chitwood =

American stunt driver (1912–1988)

- Born: George Rice Chitwood; April 14, 1912 Denison, Texas, U.S.
- Died: January 3, 1988 (aged 75) Tampa, Florida, U.S.

Championship titles
- AAA Eastern Big Car (1939, 1940)

Champ Car career
- 24+ races run over 7 years
- Best finish: 8th (1946)
- First race: 1940 Indianapolis 500 (Indianapolis)
- Last race: 1950 Darlington 200 (Darlington)
- First win: 1946 Eastern Inaugural Trophy Sweepstakes (Trenton)
- Last win: 1946 Trenton Race #3 (Trenton)
Wins	Podiums	Poles
7	12	3

Formula One World Championship career
- Active years: 1950
- Team: Kurtis Kraft
- Entries: 1
- Championships: 0
- Wins: 0
- Podiums: 0
- Career points: 1
- Pole positions: 0
- Fastest laps: 0
- First entry: 1950 Indianapolis 500

George Rice "Joie" Chitwood (April 14, 1912 – January 3, 1988) was an American stuntman, racing driver and businessman. He is best known as a daredevil in the Joie Chitwood Thrill Show.

== Early life ==
Chitwood was born in Denison, Texas. He was orphaned as a 14-year-old and he ended school after eighth grade. He lived in Topeka, Kansas during the Dust Bowl-era, and was seeking employment during the Great Depression. His main job was a shoe shiner; he also worked as a candy butcher for a burlesque show to earn additional income. He started learning a trade by helping at a welding shop.

== Racing career ==
=== Early career ===
Chitwood built his first race car from an Essex, driving the car after the driver failed to appear; he finished second. He started his racing career in 1934 at a dirt track in Winfield, Kansas. From there, he began racing big cars. In 1937 and 1938, he finished second in the Central States Racing Association (CSRA) season points standings. In 1939 and 1940 he switched to the American Automobile Association (AAA) East Coast Sprint car championship. He switched back to the CSRA and won its title in 1942, winning 14 consecutive CSRA features that season.

=== Championship and sprint car career ===
Between 1940 and 1950, Chitwood raced in the Indianapolis 500 seven times, finishing fifth on three occasions. He was the first man ever to wear a safety belt, beginning at the 1941 Indianapolis 500. Chitwood took the belt out of his dirt car because he liked how he was jostled around less, and could keep his foot on the throttle easier. Chitwood promised AAA officials Rex Mays and Wilbur Shaw that he would release the belt in the event of a crash, because drivers thought that it was safer to be thrown from a car during an accident. He won six major sprint car races in 1946. Chitwood won nine AAA East Coast features in 1947, including the first race at Williams Grove Speedway. He retired from racing in 1950.

=== World Drivers' Championship career ===
The AAA/USAC-sanctioned Indianapolis 500 was included in the FIA World Drivers' Championship from 1950 through 1960. Drivers competing at Indianapolis during those years were credited with World Drivers' Championship participation, and were eligible to score WDC points alongside those which they may have scored towards the AAA/USAC National Championship.

Chitwood participated in one World Drivers' Championship race at Indianapolis. He finished in fifth place, scoring one World Drivers' Championship point.

=== Nickname ===
Chitwood was dubbed "Joie" during his racing career, after a newspaper reporter misheard and misspelled Chitwood's name in an article. The writer confused St. Joe, Missouri (where Chitwood's race car was built) with "George", and when typesetting the article, added an "i" by mistake to spell "Joie." The nickname stuck for life.

== The Joie Chitwood Thrill Show ==
In 1942, stuntman Lucky Teter died, and Chitwood took over the show after being asked by Teter's widow to sell the equipment. Chitwood was unable to find a buyer during World War II. Chitwood was deemed 4-F, and taught welding at factories. He began operating what he called "the Joie Chitwood Thrill Show." The show was an exhibition of auto stunt driving, and became so successful Chitwood cut back his racing endeavors significantly.

Often called "Hell Drivers," Chitwood had five units that for more than forty years toured across North America, thrilling audiences in large and small towns alike with death-defying automobile stunts. Although not claiming to be of Native American descent, Chitwood often portrayed a character known as 'Chief Wahoo.' Audiences found the act believable on account of Chitwood having a darker skin tone. He also performed a ramp-to-ramp jump, using a car that had been devised by Teter. Later on he and his son, Joie Jr., perfected driving a car on two wheels.

Chitwood's show was so popular that in January 1967, their performance at the Islip Speedway in New York was broadcast on ABC television's Wide World of Sports.

Chitwood's sons, Joie Jr. and Tim, both joined the thrill show, and continued to run it after their father's retirement. The Chitwood show toured the U.S. from 1945 until 1998. On May 13, 1978, Joie Jr. set a world record when he drove a Chevrolet Chevette for 5.6 miles (9.0 km) on just two wheels.

=== Media appearances and legacy ===
Chitwood's show was featured during season 3 of CHiPs in an episode entitled "Thrill Show". Joie Jr. did stunts for Miami Vice on several occasions. Joie Jr. also appeared as a guest challenger on the TV game show To Tell The Truth. Joie Jr. worked in over 60 feature films and national commercials.

In 1983, Chitwood's show was featured in the movie Smokey and the Bandit Part 3, where Sheriff Justice ends up the star of the show during his pursuit of The Bandit.

Chitwood's show was credited by Evel Knievel as being his inspiration to become a daredevil when the show appeared in his home town of Butte, Montana.

World-champion auto dive bomber Dusty Russell began his 50+ year career as a stunt driver in 1951, when he performed at the age of 15 for Joie Chitwood's Auto Daredevils show in Idaho.

Chitwood's son Tim Chitwood became a highly prominent stunt driver and appeared in a number of movies. Chitwood's older son Joie Chitwood Jr., also worked as a stunt driver. In 2010, his grandson Joie Chitwood III became president of Daytona International Speedway.

== Hollywood stuntman ==
Chitwood was frequently hired by Hollywood film studios to either do stunt driving for films or to act as auto-stunt coordinator. Chitwood was one of the stunt drivers in the Clark Gable and Barbara Stanwyck 1950 film about auto racing, To Please a Lady.

Chitwood arranged and performed vehicle stunts for the 1973 James Bond film Live and Let Die. He has a small on-camera part as Charlie, the livery driver who picks up Bond at the Pan Am terminal at JFK International Airport and is killed by a dart from Whisper's "pimpmobile."

== Personal life ==
Chitwood's wife, Marie, worked as a dancer; she quit dancing after their marriage. The couple had two sons, Timmy and Joie Jr., born 1944. Joie Jr. had a son Joie Chitwood III (born 1971).

== Retirement and death ==
After Chitwood retired, his sons took over the business. Joie Chitwood died on January 3, 1988, in Tampa Bay, Florida.

== Legacy ==
Chitwood was named the President of the 100 Mile An Hour Club at Indianapolis Motor Speedway in 1967. The Eastern Auto Racing Club Old Timers Club inducted him in 1979, and he received the Walt Ader Memorial Award in 1986. He was inducted in the National Sprint Car Hall of Fame in 1993. Chitwood was inducted into the Motorsports Hall of Fame of America in 2010. Among his contributions to the sport was the supervision of the construction of Pennsylvania's Selinsgrove Speedway in 1945.

== Motorsports career results ==
=== Indianapolis 500 results ===
Year	Car	Start	Qual	Rank	Finish	Laps	Led	Retired
1940	42	26	121.757	25	15	190	0	Flagged
1941	25	27	120.329	29	14	177	0	Flagged
1946	24	12	119.816	28	5	200	0	Running
1947	8	22	123.157	10	22	51	0	Gears
1948	55	10	124.619	15	17	138	0	Fuel leak
1949	77	16	126.863	27	5	200	0	Running
1950	17	9	130.757	19	5*	136	0	Running
Totals						1092	0	

Starts	7
Poles	0
Front Row	0
Wins	0
Top 5	3
Top 10	3
Retired	2

* shared drive with Tony Bettenhausen

=== FIA World Drivers' Championship results ===
(key)

Year	Entrant	Chassis	Engine	1	2	3	4	5	6	7	WDC	Points
1950	Ervin Wolfe	Kurtis Kraft 2000	Offenhauser L4	GBR	MON	500; 5 *	SUI	BEL	FRA	ITA	21st=	1

* Indicates shared drive with Tony Bettenhausen.

== Filmography ==
Year	Title	Role	Notes
1968	Fireball Jungle		Uncredited
1973	Live and Let Die	Charlie	
1979	Mr. No Legs		(final film role)
1983	Smokey and the Bandit Part 3	Joie Chitwood Sr.	Joie Chitwood Show - Stunts
