= Williams Grove Speedway =

Racetrack

Coordinates: 40°9′19.11″N 77°2′0.79″W

The Grove
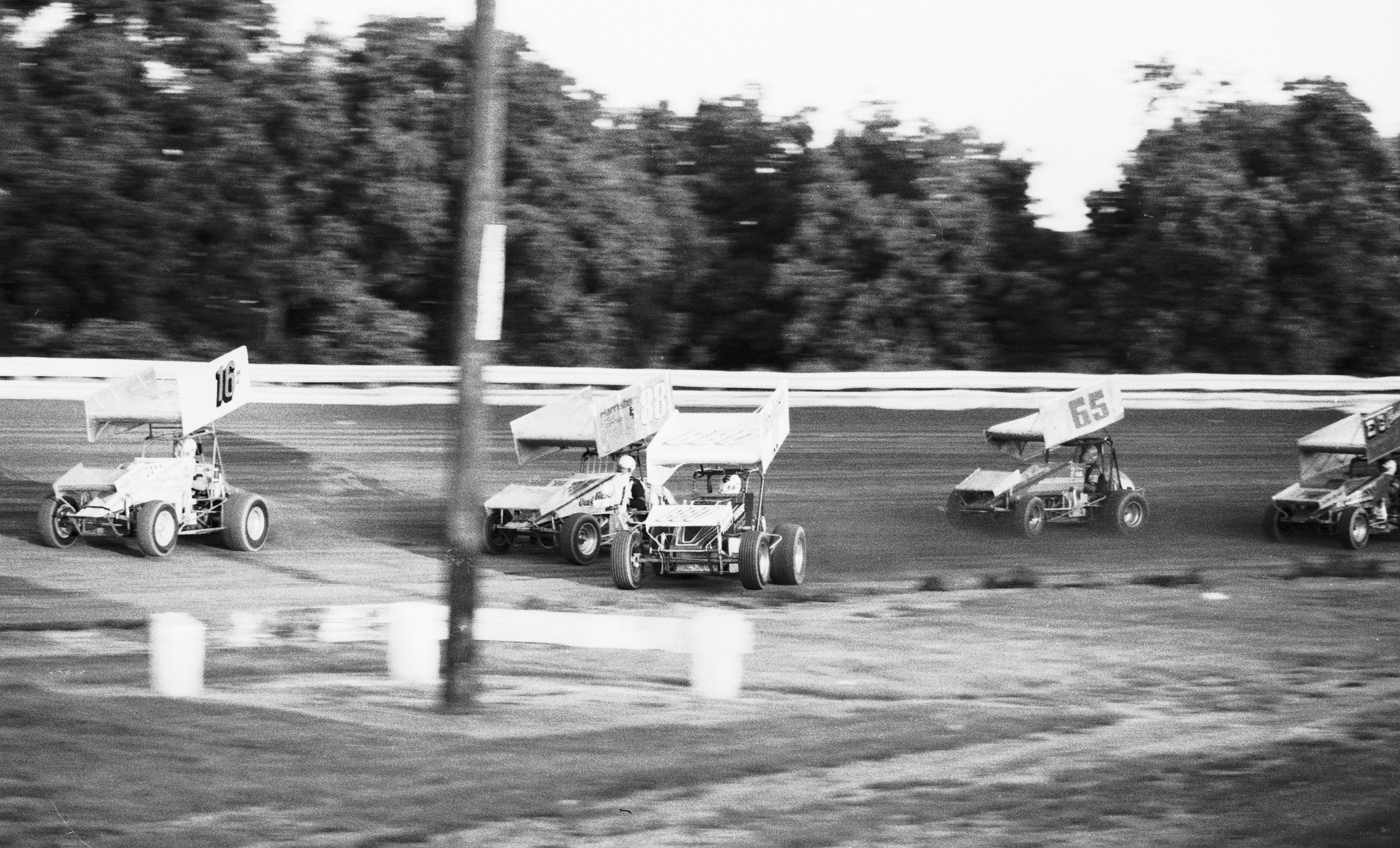
- Sprint Cars in 1985
- Location: 1 Speedway Dr., Mechanicsburg, PA 17055
- Owner: Kathleen Hughes
- Operator: Justin Loh
- Opened: 1939
- Architect: Roy Richwine
- Major events: World of Outlaws Sprint Cars; All Star Circuit of Champions; USAC Sprint Car National Championship; Pennsylvania Speedweek
- Website: http://www.williamsgrove.com

Dirt Oval
- Surface: Clay
- Length: 0.500 mi (0.804 km)
- Turns: 4
- Race lap record: 0:16.089 (TJ Stutts, TJ Stutts Racing, 2023, 410 Sprint Car)

Williams Grove Speedway is a half-mile dirt racing track located in Mechanicsburg, Pennsylvania, United States. The speedway opened on May 21, 1939, it has been owned by the Hughes family for over 50 years and has hosted many of the most notable national touring series and some of those most prestigious races in the country. The speedway is entering its 81st year of operation, with racing every Friday from March to October and other special events. One of these special events is the $75,000 to win National Open for sprint cars sanctioned by the World of Outlaws racing series held in late September or early October each year.

== History ==
=== 1930s-1940s ===
In late 1937, car owner at that time, Emmett Shelley convinced Williams Grove Park Owner Roy Richwine to build a speedway across the street from the park and on May 21, 1939, Williams Grove Speedway held its first race. The race was won by Tommy Hinnershitz. The speedway ran "big car" races under the American Automobile Association (AAA) sanction as well as select American Motorcyclist Association (AMA) Pro Flat track races in its first few years of operation. In 1942, the speedway halted operation due to World War II until after its completion in 1945. In 1947, a year after the continuation of racing, major improvements at the speedway were made including lighting for night racing, a pedestrian tunnel at the entrance to turn one and the "famous" bridge across the backstretch. In 1949, the American Championship Car Racing National Championship would make an appearance, drawing a large crowd in a race won by Johnny Mantz. At the end of the 1940s the National Roadster Championships were held at the speedway, which would help greatly influence the future of racing in the next decade.

Notable Drivers: Tommy Hinnershitz, Ted Horn, Joie Chitwood, Jimmy Chann

Notable Races: AAA East National Championship, Indy Sweepstakes, National Roadster Championship

=== 1950s ===
The 1950s saw a generational shift in racing from open wheel to flathead-powered "fendered" cars. Big cars were still a very popular attraction on select Sunday afternoons, but Jalopy Stocks became the weekly division on Fridays. These pre-war coupe's flathead engines were quickly replaced by OHV (overhead valve) power plants as post-war auto production increased and renamed Modified Stocks. Stock Cars also made numerous appearances including the NASCAR Grand National division in 1954. On the open wheel side, sanctioning changed from AAA to the newly formed United States Auto Club (USAC) in 1956. Champ Cars ran at the speedway yearly until 1959 for the Indianapolis Sweepstakes race. AMA Motorcycles and Midgets were also recurring divisions throughout the 1950s.

Notable Drivers: Tommy Hinnershitz, Johnny Thomson, Johnny Mackison Sr., Dick Tobias

Notable Races: Horn/Schindler Memorial, NASCAR Grand National, Indy Sweepstakes, Midget 100 Lap Championship

=== 1960s ===
The 1960s saw a major evolution of the dirt track racing centered in Central Pennsylvania. The Flathead-powered coupes of the 1950s gave way to Modified stock cars and their more powerful engines proved a boon to The Grove with its long straightaways and tight turns Originally built on stock frames, the full-sized prewar coupe-bodied Modifieds were powered by OHV V8 engines. Drivers like Bobby Hersh and Johnny Mackison Sr. were frequent visitors to victory lane in the early 1960s. By 1963, the Modifieds continued to evolve, now with still-recognizable stock bodies which had been narrowed, chopped and lightened. In 1964 the first Bugs (30 x 90 frames) Super Modifieds appeared. These featured drastically cut-down and sometimes custom bodies on narrowed stock frames. Kenny Weld shortly built a Modified for Bob Weikert featuring light torsion bar front suspension and down-force wings as part of the bodywork while Bobby Abel built a tube-framed Bug that weighed only 1200 pounds. The modern tubular framed integrated roll cage Sprint car emerged from these and similar developments and that basic design has now dominated both dirt and pavement racing for more than 50 years. On October 20, 1963, the "Biggest Race in the East," The National Open was born. Eventual two-time Indianapolis 500 winner Gordon Johncock would be the first winner of the Open. Ray Tilley would obtain a record that is still in place today by first winning 17 races in 1965 and then breaking his own record with 21 wins in 1966. The late 1960s saw another evolution in racing at The Grove, with the switch to a weekly program of Sprint cars. Late Models were also a featured division for a few years

Notable Drivers: Ray Tilley, Bobbie Adamson, Mitch Smith, Bobby Hersh, Johnny Mackison

Notable Races: Horn/Schindler Memorial, National Open, Spring Championship

=== 1970s ===
In the 1970s, modern Sprint Car racing and Late Models were the weekly divisions along with Midgets, Street Stocks and Limited Late Models making routine appearances throughout the decade. In 1972, 4 July weekend Jim Adams won both features of a double header in a Late Model Friday night and another win Saturday night at Selinsgrove for three feature wins in 24 hours. By 1970, Jack Gunn was in his 3rd year of promoting the speedway. He was instrumental in bringing the best talent to the area to race each week, many who decided to stay and call Central Pennsylvania home. In 1972, new ownership came to the speedway when Morgan Hughes came from New Jersey to purchase the park and speedway. The Hughes family is just the second family to ever own the famed speedway. The 1970s also brought a new era into racing with the formation of the Sprint Car touring divisions, the All-Star Circuit of Champions and World of Outlaws, which would add even bigger races to the speedway’s schedule.

Notable Drivers: Kenny Weld, Mitch Smith, Smokey Snellbaker, Kramer Williamson, Bobby Allen, Lynn Paxton, Jan Opperman, Steve Smith, Gary Snellbaker, Bobby Goodling, Ed Spencer

Notable Races: National Open, Horn/Schindler Memorial, Summer Nationals, Twin 25s, Williams Grove Late Model 100

=== 1980s ===
In the 1980s, more drivers were migrating to the area and the local talent was arguably at its best. Each week was a "who’s-who" of sprint car racing. With the newly formed World of Outlaws making regular appearances at the speedway and claiming to have the best talent in sprint car racing, a new rivalry was beginning. Through this, the term "Pennsylvania Posse" was coined for the regular sprint car drivers at the speedway to signify that there was a "new sheriff in town." While drivers such as Steve Kinser and Sammy Swindell were tearing up the national scene, Central Pennsylvania proved to house the toughest challengers. The names of Lynn Paxton, Bobby Davis Jr., Keith Kauffman and Bobby Allen among others, were leveling the playing field. The 1980s also brought on the classification of sprint car racing by engine size. Unfortunately, it also spelled the end of the 'big block' Sprint cars which, with a nod from Gambler frames, were king at The Grove until Ted Johnson threatened a boycott of Williams Grove if his Outlaws had to compete with the 520 ci aluminium engines used by the PA Posse's top teams. The main division would become 410 ci Sprint cars with aluminium blocks for national touring series but, for a time, PA's local racers were limited to iron block motors for local weekly racing. A new weekly attraction, 358 sprint cars, were added in 1989. The World of Outlaws began a Late Model series in 1988, with the first race held at the speedway. The inaugural event was won by Larry Phillips.

Notable Drivers: Lynn Paxton, Keith Kauffman, Doug Wolfgang, Bobby Davis Jr, Jim Nace, Van May, Bobby Allen

Notable Races: National Open, Summer Nationals, Twin 20s, Early Bird Championship

=== 1990s ===
Racing at the speedway saw a new youth movement. Now familiar names like Kreitz, Rahmer, Shaffer and Dewease were just beginning to find victory lane, but were doing it nearly every week. The popularity and following of sprint car racing in the area led to a plea for more racing which meant an earlier start to the season. Late February/early March races were being scheduled, which allowed more drivers out of the area to come into town before their season would naturally begin. The depth of weekly talent at each area speedway led to the formation of Pennsylvania Speedweek in 1991, a week-long series of higher paying races as a way to showcase the best drivers in the region. Williams Grove held the first race in the series on July 3, 1991 which was won by Steve Smith. 358 sprint cars were now a very promising division, drawing large car counts and acting as a development division for the 410 sprint cars. Late Models were having less weekly races at the speedway in large part because of the growing 358 sprint car division, but had a large presence when the national touring series STARS made their yearly appearance.

Notable Drivers: Don Kreitz Jr., Lance Dewease, Keith Kauffman, Todd Shaffer, Billy Pauch, Fred Rahmer, Cris Eash, Jeff Shepard, Mike Lehman

Notable Races: National Open, Summer Nationals, Twin 20s, Early Bird Championship, Mitch Smith Memorial

=== 2000s ===
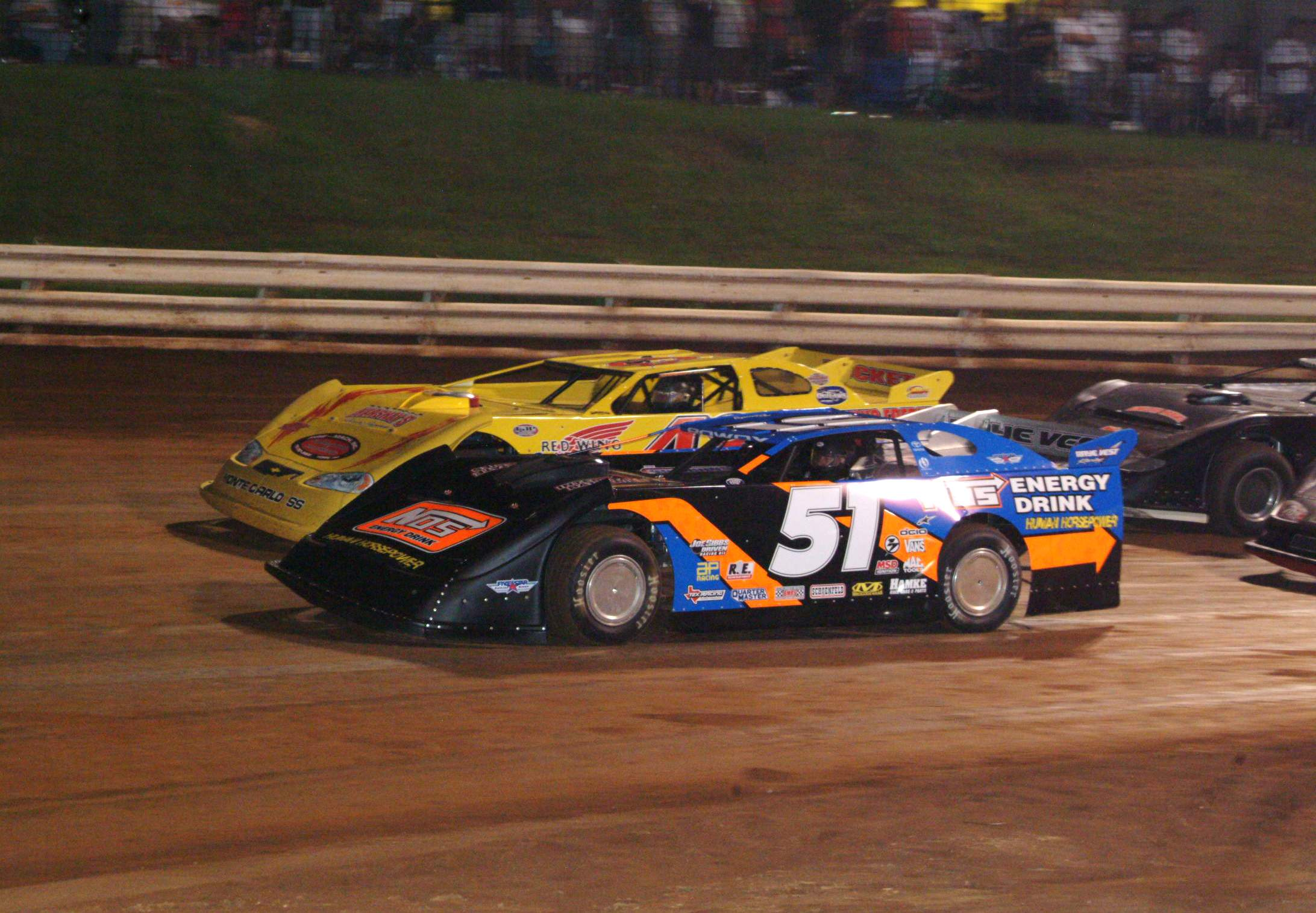
Kyle Busch' dirt late model in 2009

Most records were broken in the new century, not only because the cars were getting faster but also because Fred Rahmer, Lance Dewease and Don Kreitz Jr., were now surpassing the names of Ray Tilley, Lynn Paxton and Mitch Smith for spots on the All-Time win list. In 2006, the speedway expanded its racing program to two nights a week to incorporate the continuation of racing divisions from the closing Silver Springs Speedway. While most of the divisions from the former speedway had raced previously at Williams Grove, the "Saturday Night Series" officially began on April 15, 2006. The Super Sportsman, 358 Late Models, Street Stocks and 4 Cylinders made a handful of appearances on Saturday’s in the first few years of the series. Sunday Enduros were held once a month throughout most of the decade. In 2008, speedway owner Morgan Hughes died. He left the speedway to his family for his daughter, Kathleen, to run.

Notable Drivers: Fred Rahmer, Don Kreitz Jr., Lance Dewease, Keith Kauffman, Todd Shaffer, Greg Hodnett, Chad Layton, Pat Cannon, Cory Haas, Frankie Herr, Mike Lehman

Notable Races: National Open, Summer Nationals, Mitch Smith Memorial, Twin 20s, Triple 20s, Early Bird Championship

=== 2010s ===
The new decade saw the most events in the history of the speedway with two nights of racing throughout most of the season. The Saturday Night Series had expanded to a 15+ race schedule. In May 2011, to expand the rivalry formed between the World of Outlaws and Pennsylvania Posse, the Morgan Cup challenge was formed. The winning faction (World of Outlaws or Williams Grove Speedway) of the race was given the Morgan Cup trophy to keep at their facility for the year. In 2013, the All-Time winningest driver at the speedway, Fred Rahmer retired after winning his first National Open. In 2015, the National Open was expanded into a 3-day event, making it one of the richest events in sprint car racing.

Notable Drivers: Fred Rahmer, Greg Hodnett, Don Kreitz Jr., Lance Dewease, Kevin Nouse, Frankie Herr, Gene Knaub

Notable Races: National Open, Summer Nationals, Morgan Cup; Mitch Smith Memorial, Twin 20s, Early Bird Championship

== Track Records (1939 through 2015) ==
=== All-Time Winners ===
Name	Wins	Division
Lance Dewease	110	Sprint Cars
Fred Rahmer	91	Sprint Cars
Greg Hodnett	73	Sprint Cars, 360 Sprint Cars
Don Kreitz Jr.	61	Sprint Cars
Ray Tilley	59	Super Modifieds, Sprint Cars
Keith Kauffman	51	Sprint Cars
Gene Knaub	47	358 Late Models, 358 Sprint Cars
Lynn Paxton	46	Sprint Cars, Super Modifieds, Midgets
Smokey Snellbaker	45	Sprint Cars, Super Sportsman
Mitch Smith	41	Sprint Cars, Jalopy, Endurance, Go-Karts

=== Record holders ===
- Most modern-day wins: Lance Dewease
- Most wins in a single season: Ray Tilley, 21 (1966)
- Most consecutive wins: Steve Smith, 6 (1976)
- Most top five finishes in a single season: Keith Kauffman, 25 (1984)
- Most Point Championships: Fred Rahmer, 9 (1997- 2000, 2004-2006, 2008, 2013)

=== Lap Records ===
- 1 lap (Pre weight limit): Brian Paulus, 16.140, 4-26-02
- 1 lap (Post weight limit): Tj Stutts, 16.089, 4-7-23
- 4 laps: Fred Rahmer, 1:15.35, 8-28-98
- 5 laps: Rick Lafferty, 1:22.77, 5-20-05
- 6 laps: Fred Rahmer, 1:37.29, 10-1-05
- 8 laps: Kraig Kinser, 2:13.88, 10-4-03
- 10 laps: Jeff Sheppard, 2:45.28, 4-13-07
- 12 laps: Sammy Swindell, 3:25.81, 5-27-04
- 15 laps: Barry Camp, 5:03.13, 9-30-88
- 20 laps: Lance Dewease, 6:08.77, 8-30-02
- 25 laps: Todd Shaffer, 7:31.32, 3-20-09
- 30 laps: Steve Smith, 9:30.24, 5-29-98

=== Record Setting Years ===
- Most winners in a single season: 23 (1988)
- Most top 5 finishers in a single season: 40 (1983, 1987, 2008)

=== Youngest Winners ===
- 410 sprints: Gio Scelzi (16 years, 10 months,)
- 358 Sprints: Chase Dietz (16 years, 5 months, 2 days)
- Super Sportsman: Dylan Cisney (16 years, 2 months, 13 days)
- 358 Late Models: Kyle Lee (15 years, 9 months, 23 days)
- Street Stocks: Chad Smith (21 years, 9 months, 16 days)

== Media ==
The speedway has had numerous races broadcast on national television. It has been featured in many books, magazines and documentaries. It was also featured in several video games, including the games Dirt Track Racing 2, Dirt Track Racing: Sprint Cars and World of Outlaws: Sprint Cars 2002.

== See also ==
- National Sprint Car Hall of Fame & Museum
- Eldora Speedway
- Knoxville Raceway
- Pocono Raceway
- World of Outlaws
