= 1949 Indianapolis 500 =

American motor race

33rd Indianapolis 500
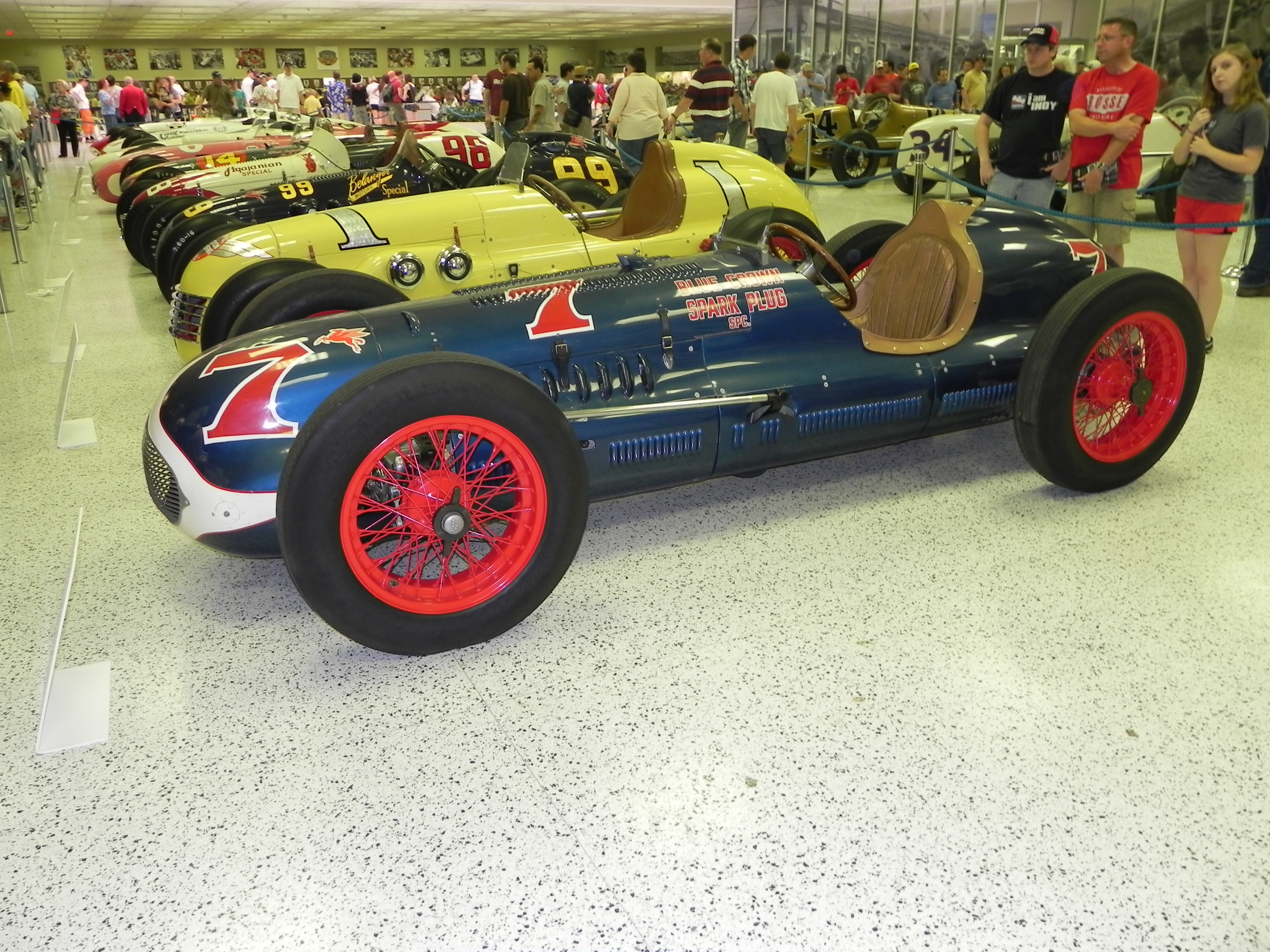

Indianapolis Motor Speedway

Indianapolis 500
- Sanctioning body: AAA
- Date: May 30, 1949
- Winner: Bill Holland
- Winning Entrant: Lou Moore
- Winning Chief Mechanic: Charles Marant
- Winning time: 4:07:15.97
- Average speed: 121.327 mph (195.257 km/h)
- Pole position: Duke Nalon
- Pole speed: 132.939 mph (213.945 km/h)
- Most laps led: Bill Holland (146)

Pre-race
- Pace car: Oldsmobile 88
- Pace car driver: Wilbur Shaw
- Starter: Seth Klein
- Honorary referee: J. Emmett McManamon
- Estimated attendance: 150,000

Chronology
| Previous | Next |
|---|---|
| 1948 | 1950 |

The 33rd International 500-Mile Sweepstakes was an automobile race held at the Indianapolis Motor Speedway on Monday, May 30, 1949.

After two years of failures to his teammate, Bill Holland finally won one for himself. Giving car owner Lou Moore his third consecutive Indy victory. Mauri Rose was fired by the team after the race when he again ignored orders and tried to pass Holland, only to see his car fail with 8 laps to go.

Spider Webb suffered a broken transmission the morning of the race and failed to start. Rather than utilize an alternate starter, officials awarded Webb the 33rd finishing position.

Offenhauser-powered cars locked 28 out of the 33 starting positions, and the top 19 finishing positions.

== Starting grid ==
| Row | Inside | | Middle | | Outside | |
|---|---|---|---|---|---|---|
| 1 | 54 | (United States) Duke Nalon | 5 | (United States) Rex Mays | 33 | (United States) Jack McGrath |
| 2 | 7 | (United States) Bill Holland | 17 | (United States) Duane Carter | 22 | (United States) George Connor |
| 3 | 61 | (United States) Jimmy Jackson | 26 | (United States) George Lynch R | 98 | (United States) Johnny Mantz |
| 4 | 3 | (United States) Mauri Rose W | 14 | (United States) Hal Cole | 12 | (United States) Johnnie Parsons R |
| 5 | 2 | (United States) Myron Fohr R | 8 | (United States) Mack Hellings | 29 | (United States) Duke Dinsmore |
| 6 | 77 | (United States) Joie Chitwood | 57 | (United States) Jackie Holmes R | 64 | (United States) Troy Ruttman R |
| 7 | 19 | (United States) Paul Russo | 6 | (United States) Lee Wallard | 68 | (United States) Jim Rathmann R |
| 8 | 4 | (United States) Bill Sheffler | 18 | (United States) Sam Hanks | 71 | (United States) Norm Houser R |
| 9 | 38 | (United States) George Fonder R | 37 | (United States) Spider Webb | 10 | (United States) Charles Van Acker |
| 10 | 32 | (United States) Johnny McDowell R | 69 | (United States) Bayliss Levrett R | 74 | (United States) Bill Cantrell |
| 11 | 15 | (United States) Fred Agabashian | 9 | (United States) Emil Andres | 52 | (United States) Manny Ayulo R |

R Indianapolis 500 rookie
W Indianapolis 500 winner

=== Alternates ===
- First alternate: Ralph Pratt R (#34)

=== Failed to Qualify ===
- Les Anderson (#74)
- Henry Banks (#35)
- Frank Beardsley R
- Randall Beinke R (#42)
- Tony Bettenhausen (#16, #46)
- Lindley Bothwell R (#66)
- Frank Brisko (#48)
- Walt Brown (#18)
- Jim Brubaker R (#79)
- Frank Burany R (#24)
- Jimmy Daywalt R (#56)
- Billy Devore
- Ted Duncan R (#72)
- Kenny Eaton R (#55)
- Milt Fankhouser (#73)
- Pat Flaherty R (#43)
- Dick Fraizer R (#59)
- Eddie Haddad R (#47)
- Mel Hansen (#44)
- Tommy Hinnershitz (#15, #18)
- Byron Horne R (#39)
- Danny Kladis (#58)
- Tommy Mattson R
- Johnny Mauro (#16)
- George Metzler R (#67) - Fatal accident
- Chet Miller (#65)
- Hal Robson (#23)
- Mike Salay (#49)
- Wally Stokes R (#75)
- Bill Taylor R (#51)
- Joel Thorne (#81)
- Louis Tomei (#42)
- Doc Williams (#65)

== Box score ==
| Finish | Start | No | Name | Chassis | Engine | Qual | Rank | Laps | Status |
|---|---|---|---|---|---|---|---|---|---|
| 1 | 4 | 7 | (United States) Bill Holland | Diedt | Offenhauser | 128.673 | 9 | 200 | 121.327 mph |
| 2 | 12 | 12 | (United States) Johnnie Parsons R | Kurtis Kraft | Offenhauser | 132.900 | 2 | 200 | +3:11.00 |
| 3 | 6 | 22 | (United States) George Connor | Lesovsky | Offenhauser | 128.228 | 13 | 200 | +3:34.81 |
| 4 | 13 | 2 | (United States) Myron Fohr R | Marchese | Offenhauser | 129.776 | 3 | 200 | +5:16.68 |
| 5 | 16 | 77 | (United States) Joie Chitwood | Kurtis Kraft | Offenhauser | 126.863 | 27 | 200 | +5:21.00 |
| 6 | 7 | 61 | (United States) Jimmy Jackson | Diedt | Offenhauser | 128.023 | 15 | 200 | +7:15.03 |
| 7 | 9 | 98 | (United States) Johnny Mantz | Kurtis Kraft | Offenhauser | 127.786 | 18 | 200 | +8:50.04 |
| 8 | 19 | 19 | (United States) Paul Russo | Slines | Offenhauser | 129.487 | 5 | 200 | +20:55.31 |
| 9 | 32 | 9 | (United States) Emil Andres (Walt Brown Laps 19–197) | Slines | Offenhauser | 126.042 | 31 | 197 | Flagged |
| 10 | 24 | 71 | (United States) Norm Houser R | Langley | Offenhauser | 127.756 | 20 | 181 | Flagged |
| 11 | 21 | 68 | (United States) Jim Rathmann R | Wetteroth | Offenhauser | 126.516 | 29 | 175 | Flagged |
| 12 | 18 | 64 | (United States) Troy Ruttman R | Wetteroth | Offenhauser | 125.945 | 32 | 151 | Flagged |
| 13 | 10 | 3 | (United States) Mauri Rose W | Diedt | Offenhauser | 127.759 | 19 | 192 | Magneto strap |
| 14 | 5 | 17 | (United States) Duane Carter | Stevens | Offenhauser | 128.233 | 12 | 182 | Spun T3 |
| 15 | 15 | 29 | (United States) Duke Dinsmore | Olson | Offenhauser | 127.750 | 21 | 174 | Radius rod |
| 16 | 14 | 8 | (United States) Mack Hellings | Kurtis Kraft | Offenhauser | 128.260 | 11 | 172 | Valve |
| 17 | 22 | 4 | (United States) Bill Sheffler | Bromme | Offenhauser | 128.521 | 10 | 160 | Rod |
| 18 | 28 | 32 | (United States) Johnny McDowell R | Meyer | Offenhauser | 126.139 | 30 | 142 | Magneto |
| 19 | 11 | 14 | (United States) Hal Cole | Kurtis Kraft | Offenhauser | 127.168 | 24 | 117 | Rod bearing |
| 20 | 25 | 38 | (United States) George Fonder R (Mel Hansen Laps 68–116) | Adams | Sparks | 127.289 | 22 | 116 | Valve |
| 21 | 30 | 74 | (United States) Bill Cantrell | Kurtis Kraft | Offenhauser | 127.191 | 23 | 95 | Drive shaft |
| 22 | 17 | 57 | (United States) Jackie Holmes R | Kurtis Kraft | Offenhauser | 128.087 | 14 | 65 | Drive shaft |
| 23 | 20 | 6 | (United States) Lee Wallard | Maserati | Maserati | 128.912 | 7 | 55 | Gears |
| 24 | 29 | 69 | (United States) Bayliss Levrett R | Kurtis Kraft | Offenhauser | 129.236 | 6 | 52 | Drain plug |
| 25 | 2 | 5 | (United States) Rex Mays | Kurtis Kraft | Novi | 129.552 | 4 | 48 | Engine |
| 26 | 3 | 33 | (United States) Jack McGrath | Kurtis Kraft | Offenhauser | 128.884 | 8 | 39 | Oil pump |
| 27 | 31 | 15 | (United States) Fred Agabashian | Maserati | Maserati | 127.007 | 25 | 38 | Overheating |
| 28 | 33 | 52 | (United States) Manny Ayulo R | Bromme | Offenhauser | 125.799 | 33 | 24 | Rod |
| 29 | 1 | 54 | (United States) Duke Nalon | Kurtis Kraft | Novi | 132.939 | 1 | 23 | Crash T3 |
| 30 | 23 | 18 | (United States) Sam Hanks | Kurtis Kraft | Offenhauser | 127.809 | 17 | 20 | Oil leak |
| 31 | 27 | 10 | (United States) Charles Van Acker | Stevens | Offenhauser | 126.524 | 28 | 10 | Crash T4 |
| 32 | 8 | 26 | (United States) George Lynch R | Rassey | Offenhauser | 127.823 | 16 | 1 | Crash T1 |
| 33 | 26 | 37 | (United States) Spider Webb | Bromme | Offenhauser | 127.002 | 26 | 0 | Transmission |

Note: Relief drivers in parentheses

W Former Indianapolis 500 winner

R Indianapolis 500 Rookie

All entrants utilized Firestone tires.

=== Race statistics ===
Lap Leaders
| Laps | Leader |
|---|---|
| 1–23 | Duke Nalon |
| 24–35 | Rex Mays |
| 36–54 | Lee Wallard |
| 55–200 | Bill Holland |

Total laps led
| Driver | Laps |
|---|---|
| Bill Holland | 146 |
| Duke Nalon | 23 |
| Lee Wallard | 19 |
| Rex Mays | 12 |

Yellow Lights: 8 minutes, 30 seconds
| Laps* | Reason |
|---|---|
| 2 | George Lynch crash in turn 1 (<1 minute) |
| 12–13 | Charles Van Acker crash in turn 4 (1:35) |
| 24–27 | Duke Nalon crash in turn 3 (6:00) |
* – Approximate lap counts

== Broadcasting ==
=== Radio ===
The race was carried live on the Mutual Broadcasting System, the precursor to the IMS Radio Network. The broadcast was sponsored by Perfect Circle Piston Rings and Bill Slater served as the anchor. The broadcast featured live coverage of the start, the finish, and live updates throughout the race.

Mutual Broadcasting System
| Booth Announcers | Turn Reporters | Roving reporters |
|---|---|---|
| Booth Announcer: Bill Slater; Analyst: Gordon Graham | South turns: Sid Collins; Backstretch: Gene Kelly; North turns: Jim Shelton | Barry Lake |

=== Television ===
The race was carried live for the first time in the history of television on WFBM-TV Channel 6 of Indianapolis. The station signed on for the first time on the morning of May 30, 1949, with a documentary about the race entitled The Crucible of Speed, then coverage of the race itself. The race broadcast used three cameras located along the front stretch. Earl Townsend Jr., who previously worked as a radio reporter, was the first television announcer. Dick Pittenger and Paul Roberts joined Townsend along with engineer Robert Robbins. The telecast reached approximately 3,000 local households.

WFBM-TV Television
| Play-by-play | Pit reporters |
|---|---|
| Announcer: Earl Townsend Jr. Color: Dick Pittenger; Color: Paul Roberts | Robert Robbins |

== See also ==
- 1949 AAA Championship Car season

== Notes ==
=== Works cited ===
- 1949 Indianapolis 500 Radio Broadcast, Mutual: Re-broadcast on "The All-Night Race Party" – WIBC-AM (May 28, 2005)
- Van Camp's Pork & Beans Presents: Great Moments From the Indy 500 – Fleetwood Sounds, 1975

=== References ===
| 1948 Indianapolis 500; Mauri Rose | 1949 Indianapolis 500; Bill Holland | 1950 Indianapolis 500; Johnnie Parsons |
| Preceded by 119.814 mph (1948 Indianapolis 500) | Record for the fastest average speed 121.327 mph | Succeeded by 124.002 mph (1950 Indianapolis 500) |
