= 1948 Indianapolis 500 =

American motor race

32nd Indianapolis 500
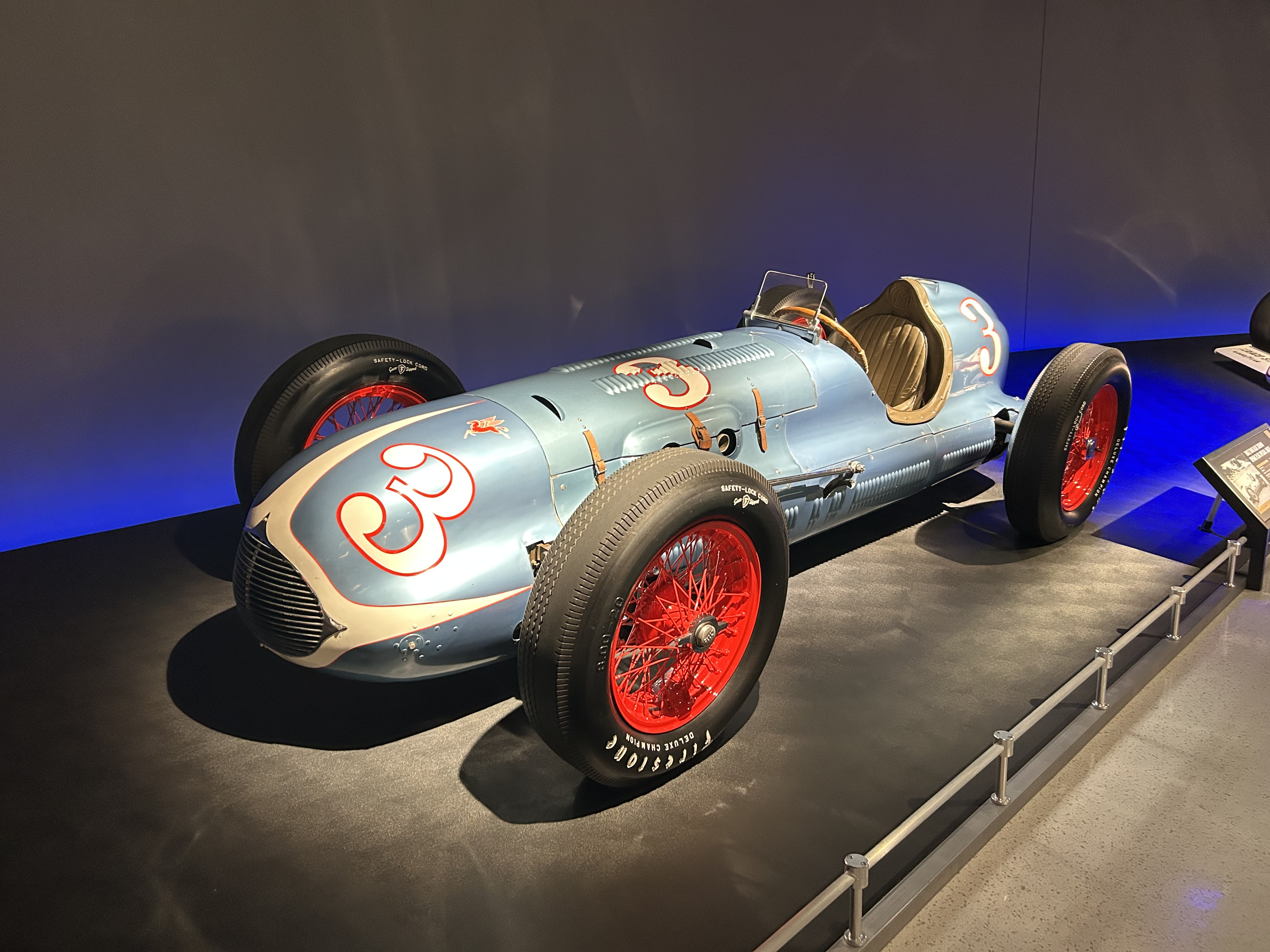

Indianapolis Motor Speedway

Indianapolis 500
- Sanctioning body: AAA
- Date: May 31, 1948
- Winner: Mauri Rose
- Winning Entrant: Lou Moore
- Winning Chief Mechanic: Roscoe Ford
- Winning time: 4:10:23.33
- Average speed: 119.814 mph (192.822 km/h)
- Pole position: Rex Mays
- Pole speed: 130.577 mph (210.143 km/h)
- Most laps led: Mauri Rose (81)

Pre-race
- Pace car: Chevrolet Fleetmaster
- Pace car driver: Wilbur Shaw
- Starter: Seth Klein
- Honorary referee: Albert G. Feeney
- Estimated attendance: 200,000

Chronology
Previous	Next
1947	1949

The 32nd International 500-Mile Sweepstakes was held at the Indianapolis Motor Speedway on Monday, May 31, 1948.

For the second year in a row, the Blue Crown Spark Plug teammates Mauri Rose and Bill Holland finished 1st-2nd. Rose became the second driver to win the Indianapolis 500 in consecutive years. Unlike the previous year's race, no controversy surrounds the results. Coupled with his co-victory in 1941, Rose became the third three-time winner at Indy.

Fourth place finisher Ted Horn completed a noteworthy record of nine consecutive races from 1936 to 1948 completing 1,799 out of a possible 1,800 laps. His nine consecutive finishes of 4th or better (however, with no victories) is the best such streak in Indy history. The only lap he missed in 1940 was due to being flagged for a rain shower.

Duke Nalon's third-place finish would be the best-ever result for the popular Novi engine.

As a point of interest, Billy Devore competed in a six-wheeled Kurtis Kraft, finishing 12th — the only car of this type ever to compete in the Indianapolis 500.

== Starting grid ==
Row	Inside		Middle		Outside	
1	5	(United States) Rex Mays	2	(United States) Bill Holland	3	(United States) Mauri Rose W
2	61	(United States) Jimmy Jackson	1	(United States) Ted Horn	74	(United States) Doc Williams
3	36	(United States) Bill Cantrell R	98	(United States) Johnny Mantz R	34	(United States) Les Anderson
4	55	(United States) Joie Chitwood	54	(United States) Duke Nalon	4	(United States) Charles Van Acker
5	52	(United States) Jack McGrath R	63	(United States) Hal Cole	76	(United States) Sam Hanks
6	8	(United States) Emil Andres	9	(United States) George Connor	64	(United States) Hal Robson
7	31	(United States) Chet Miller	19	(United States) Billy Devore	35	(United States) Mack Hellings R
8	6	(United States) Tony Bettenhausen	7	(United States) Tommy Hinnershitz	53	(United States) Bill Sheffler
9	25	(United States) Paul Russo	65	(United States) Harry McQuinn	33	(United States) Johnny Mauro R
10	91	(United States) Lee Wallard R	16	(United States) Duane Carter R	51	(United States) Spider Webb R
11	86	(United States) Mike Salay R	26	(United States) Fred Agabashian	17	(United States) Mel Hansen

R Indianapolis 500 rookie
W Indianapolis 500 winner

=== Alternates ===
- First alternate: Johnny Shackleford R (#48)

=== Failed to Qualify ===
- Walt Ader R (#15, #45)
- Manny Ayulo R (#88)
- Henry Banks (#38)
- Cliff Bergere (#12, #85)
- Walt Brown (#69)
- Jim Brubaker R (#14)
- Red Byron R (#43)
- Bob Droeger R (#44)
- Louis Durant (#29)
- Milt Fankhouser (#23)
- Myron Fohr R (#32)
- Ken Fowler (#41)
- Roland Free (#73)
- Andy Granatelli R (#39, #59)
- Art Hartsfeld R (#27)
- Ralph Hepburn (#12) - Fatal accident
- Jackie Holmes R (#24, #93)
- Ronney Householder (#68)
- George Lynch R (#56)
- George Metzler R (#47)
- Al Miller (#66)
- Cowboy O'Rourke R (#45)
- Johnnie Parsons R (#39)
- Joe Perkins R (#62)
- Ralph Pratt R (#87)
- Charlie Rogers R (#89)
- Pete Romcevich (#49)
- Loral Tansy R (#71)
- Joel Thorne (#57)
- Louis Tomei (#10)
- Eddie Zalucki R (#21)

== Box score ==
Finish	Start	No	Name	Chassis	Engine	Qual	Rank	Laps	Status
1	3	3	(United States) Mauri Rose W	Diedt	Offenhauser	129.129	4	200	119.814 mph
2	2	2	(United States) Bill Holland	Diedt	Offenhauser	129.515	3	200	+1:23.77
3	11	54	(United States) Duke Nalon	Kurtis Kraft	Novi	131.603	1	200	+3:46.45
4	5	1	(United States) Ted Horn	Maserati	Maserati	126.565	9	200	+4:07.14
5	21	35	(United States) Mack Hellings R	Kurtis Kraft	Offenhauser	127.968	6	200	+14:15.19
6	14	63	(United States) Hal Cole	Kurtis Kraft	Offenhauser	124.391	18	200	+18:27.53
7	28	91	(United States) Lee Wallard R	Meyer	Offenhauser	128.420	5	200	+24:23.67
8	27	33	(United States) Johnny Mauro R (Louis Durant Laps 112–140)	Alfa Romeo	Alfa Romeo	121.790	33	198	Flagged
9	23	7	(United States) Tommy Hinnershitz	Kurtis Kraft	Offenhauser	125.122	14	198	Flagged
10	4	61	(United States) Jimmy Jackson	Diedt	Offenhauser	127.510	7	193	Spindle
11	12	4	(United States) Charles Van Acker	Stevens	Offenhauser	125.440	13	192	Flagged
12	20	19	(United States) Billy Devore	Kurtis Kraft	Offenhauser	123.967	21	190	Flagged
13	8	98	(United States) Johnny Mantz R	Kurtis Kraft	Offenhauser	122.791	27	185	Flagged
14	22	6	(United States) Tony Bettenhausen	Stevens	Offenhauser	126.396	10	167	Clutch
15	18	64	(United States) Hal Robson	Adams	Offenhauser	122.796	26	164	Valve
16	7	36	(United States) Bill Cantrell R	Stevens	Fageol	123.733	22	161	Steering
17	10	55	(United States) Joie Chitwood (Paul Russo Laps 54–74) (Johnny Shackleford laps 106–136)	Shaw	Offenhauser	124.619	15	138	Fuel leak
18	24	53	(United States) Bill Sheffler	Bromme	Offenhauser	124.529	17	132	Spark plugs
19	1	5	(United States) Rex Mays	Kurtis Kraft	Winfield	130.577	2	129	Fuel leak
20	19	31	(United States) Chet Miller (Ken Fowler laps 30–50) (Louis Tomei laps 51–108)	Mercedes-Benz W154	Mercedes	127.249	8	108	Oil trouble
21	13	52	(United States) Jack McGrath R	Bromme	Offenhauser	124.580	16	70	Stalled
22	29	16	(United States) Duane Carter R	Wetteroth	Offenhauser	126.015	11	59	Lost wheel
23	32	26	(United States) Fred Agabashian	Kurtis Kraft	Duray	122.737	28	58	Oil line
24	9	34	(United States) Les Anderson	Kurtis Kraft	Offenhauser	122.337	30	58	Gears
25	33	17	(United States) Mel Hansen	Adams	Sparks	122.117	32	42	Too slow
26	15	76	(United States) Sam Hanks	Adams	Sparks	124.266	19	34	Clutch
27	30	51	(United States) Spider Webb R	Bromme	Offenhauser	125.545	12	27	Oil line
28	17	9	(United States) George Connor	Stevens	Offenhauser	123.018	25	24	Drive shaft
29	6	74	(United States) Doc Williams	Cooper	Offenhauser	124.151	20	19	Clutch
30	31	86	(United States) Mike Salay R	Wetteroth	Offenhauser	123.393	24	13	Stalled
31	16	8	(United States) Emil Andres	Kurtis Kraft	Offenhauser	123.550	23	11	Steering
32	25	25	(United States) Paul Russo	Maserati	Maserati	122.595	29	7	Oil leak
33	26	65	(United States) Harry McQuinn	Maserati	Maserati	122.154	31	1	Supercharger

Note: Relief drivers in parentheses

W Former Indianapolis 500 winner

R Indianapolis 500 Rookie

All entrants utilized Firestone tires.

=== Race statistics ===
Lap Leaders
Laps	Leader
1–17	Rex Mays
18–72	Ted Horn
73–91	Rex Mays
92–100	Duke Nalon
101–123	Mauri Rose
124–142	Ted Horn
143–200	Mauri Rose

Total laps led
Driver	Laps
Mauri Rose	81
Ted Horn	74
Rex Mays	36
Duke Nalon	9

Yellow Lights: 10 minutes, 40 seconds
Laps*	Reason
60–69	Duane Carter lost wheel in turn 2, spun on backstretch
* – Approximate lap counts

== Broadcasting ==
=== Radio ===
The race was carried live on the Mutual Broadcasting System, the precursor to the IMS Radio Network. The broadcast was sponsored by Perfect Circle Piston Rings and Bill Slater served as the anchor. The broadcast feature live coverage of the start, the finish, and live updates throughout the race.

Sid Collins, from WIBC, joined the crew for the first time, serving as a turn reporter at the south end of the track.

== Gallery ==
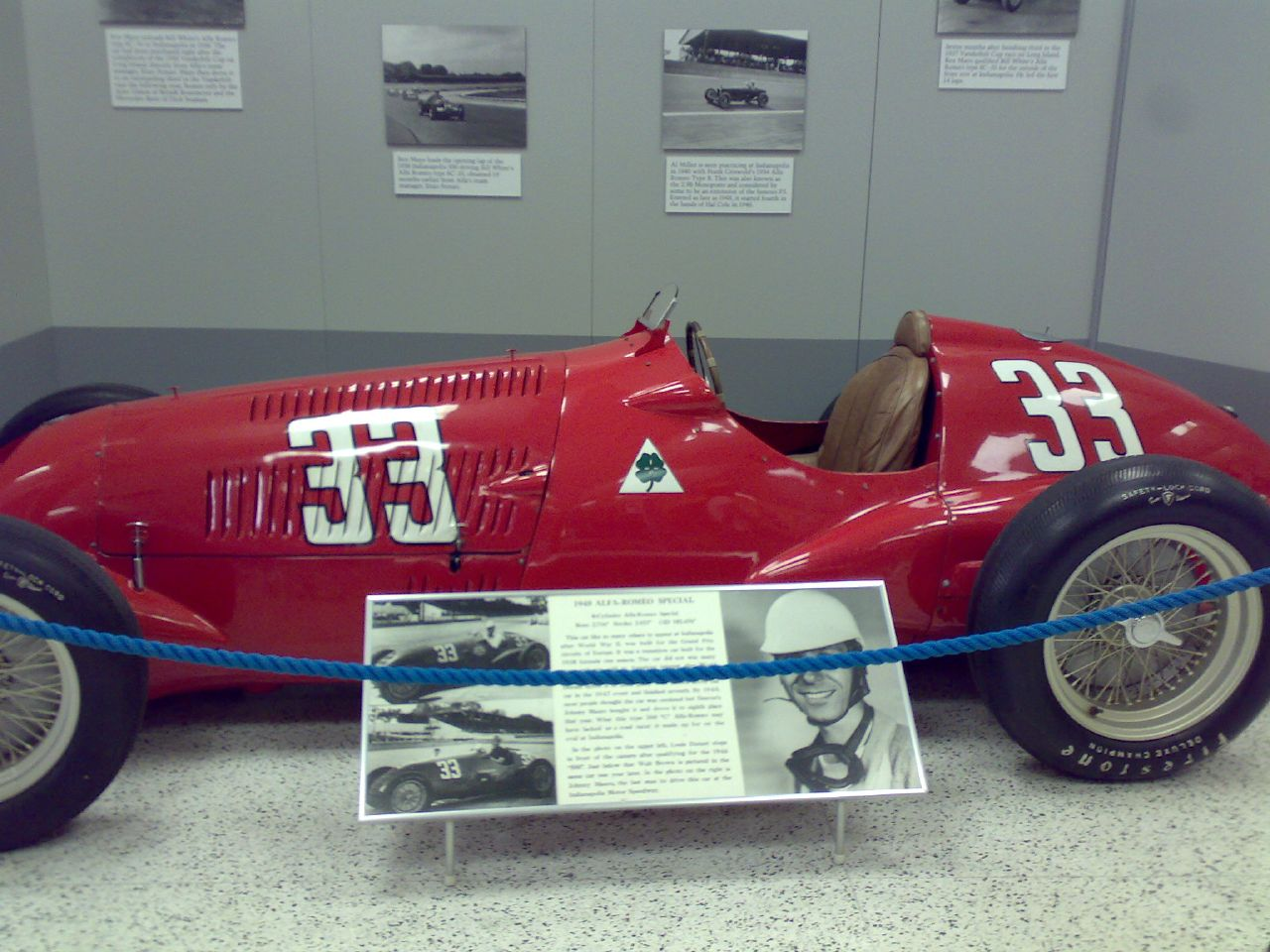
Johnny Mauro's 1948 Alfa Romeo 308

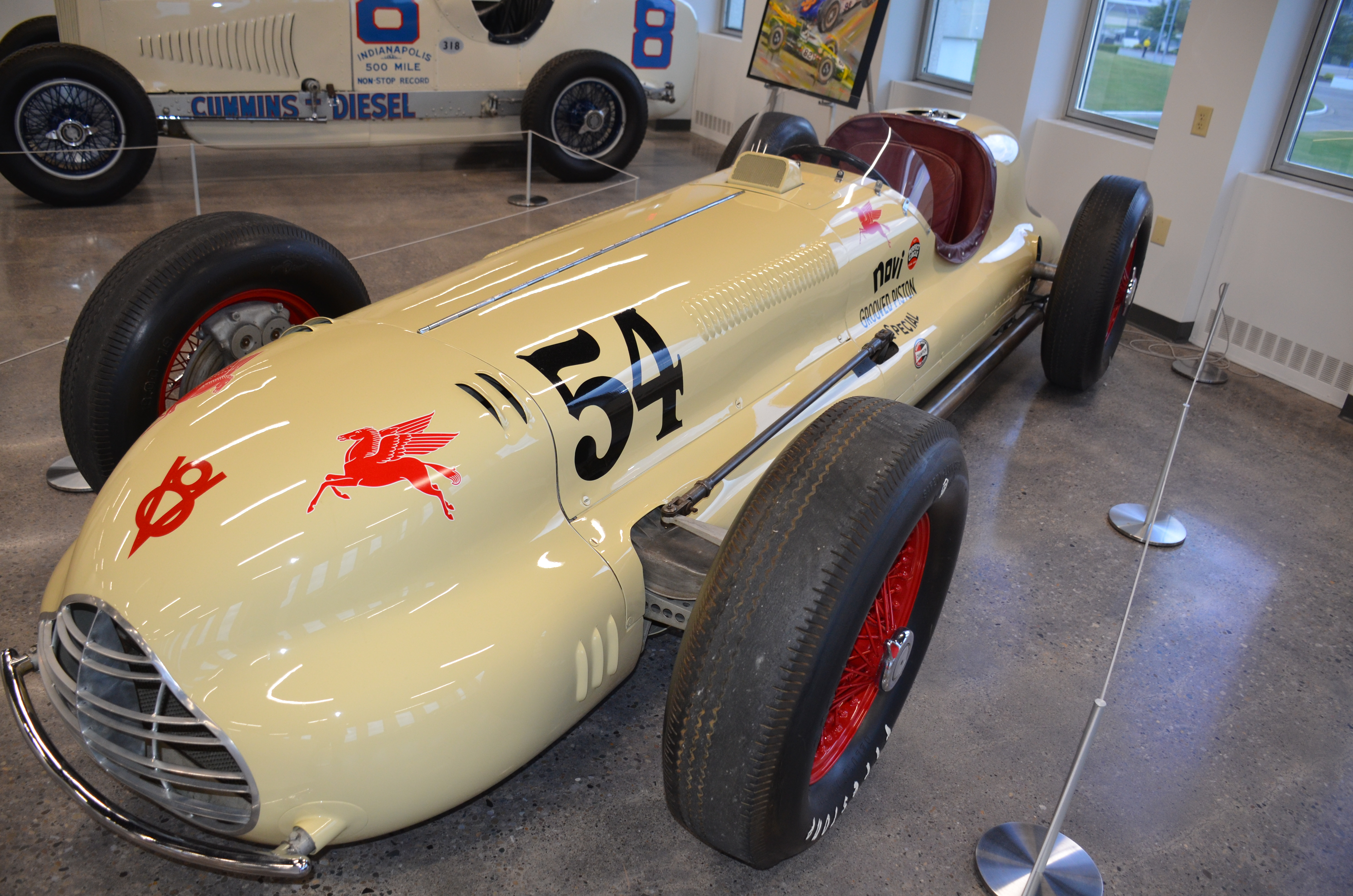
1948 Novi

== See also ==
- 1948 AAA Championship Car season

== Notes ==
=== References ===
1947 Indianapolis 500; Mauri Rose	1948 Indianapolis 500; Mauri Rose	1949 Indianapolis 500; Bill Holland
Preceded by 117.200 mph (1938 Indianapolis 500)	Record for the fastest average speed 119.814 mph	Succeeded by 121.327 mph (1949 Indianapolis 500)
