= William Cantrell =

American racing driver (1908–1996)

- Born: January 31, 1908; West Point, Kentucky, U.S.
- Died: January 22, 1996 (aged 87)

Formula One World Championship career
- Nationality: (United States) American
- Active years: 1950, 1952
- Team(s): Adams, Ewing
- Entries: 2 (1 start)
- Championships: 0
- Wins: 0
- Podiums: 0
- Career points: 0
- Pole positions: 0
- Fastest laps: 0
- First entry: 1950 Indianapolis 500
- Last entry: 1952 Indianapolis 500

William "Wild Bill" Cantrell (born in West Point, Kentucky, January 31, 1908 - died January 22, 1996) was a power boat and IndyCar driver.

In 1949, Cantrell won the prestigious hydroplane Gold Cup in Detroit. He was inducted in the Motorsports Hall of Fame of America in 1992 in the power boats category.

== Indy 500 results ==
Year	Car	Start	Qual	Rank	Finish	Laps	Led	Retired
1948	36	7	123.733	22	16	161	0	Steering
1949	74	30	127.191	23	21	95	0	Drive shaft
1950	24*	-	-	-	27	108	0	Oil pressure
Totals						256	0	

Starts	2
Poles	0
Front Row	0
Wins	0
Top 5	0
Top 10	0
Retired	3

* shared drive with Bayliss Levrett

== Complete Formula One World Championship results ==
(key)

Year	Entrant	Chassis	Engine	1	2	3	4	5	6	7	8	WDC	Points
1950	Richard Palmer	Adams	Offenhauser L4	GBR	MON	500; 27 *	SUI	BEL	FRA	ITA		NC	0
1952	Pat Clancy	Ewing	Offenhauser L4	SUI	500; DNQ	BEL	FRA	GBR	GER	NED	ITA	NC	0

* Indicates shared drive with Bayliss Levrett.
