= Duane Carter =

American racing driver (1913–1993)

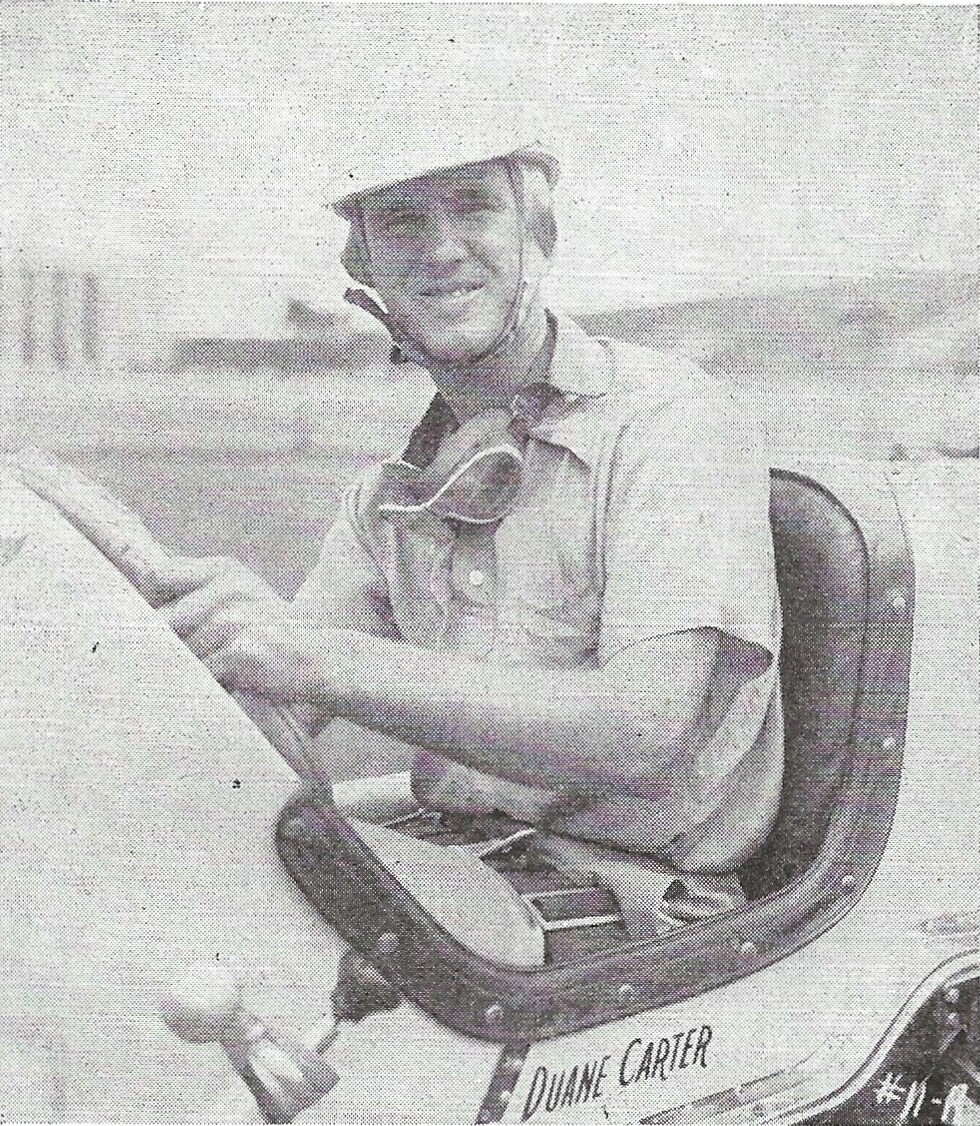
- Carter at Chicago's Soldier Field racetrack, circa 1946
- Born: Duane Claude Carter; May 5, 1913 Fresno, California, U.S.
- Died: March 7, 1993 (aged 79) Indianapolis, Indiana, U.S.

Awards
- Indianapolis Motor Speedway Hall of Fame (2005)

Champ Car career
- 45 races run over 15 years
- Years active: 1947-1955, 1959-1964
- Best finish: 4th – 1952
- First race: 1948 Indianapolis 500 (Indianapolis)
- Last race: 1963 Indianapolis 500 (Indianapolis)
Wins	Podiums	Poles
0	4	1

Formula One World Championship career
- Active years: 1950 – 1955, 1959 – 1960
- Team(s): Kurtis Kraft, Kuzma, Lesovsky, Stevens, Diedt
- Entries: 8
- Championships: 0
- Wins: 0
- Podiums: 1
- Career points: 6.5
- Pole positions: 0
- Fastest laps: 0
- First entry: 1950 Indianapolis 500
- Last entry: 1960 Indianapolis 500

Duane Claude Carter (May 5, 1913 – March 7, 1993) was an American racecar driver. He raced midget cars, sprint cars, and IndyCars. Carter was born in Fresno, California, and he died in Indianapolis, Indiana. His son Pancho raced in Indy cars, along with Johnny Parsons (whom he helped raise).

== Racing career ==
=== Midget cars ===
Carter started racing midgets at the 1/5 mile dirt track in the west side of Fresno while attending Fresno State University. He was one of six drivers who went to Western Springs Stadium in Auckland, New Zealand in 1937. He won the first ever midget car race at that track. The car he drove still exists in a museum in Auckland. He was a consistent winner on the Nutley board track in 1939 while future journalist Chris Economaki was his unofficial crew chief. He won the 1940 Detroit VFW Motor Speedway title, the 1942 championship at Sportsman Park in Cleveland. He captured a 500 lap victory in his midget car at the 1947 Los Angeles Coliseum Motordome after Danny Oakes was initially declared the winner.

=== Sprint cars ===
Carter moved up to the sprint cars, and won the 1950 Midwest division.

=== Indy Cars ===
Carter drove in the AAA and USAC Championship Car series, racing in the 1948–1955, 1959–1960, and 1963 seasons with 47 starts, including the Indianapolis 500 races in each season. He finished in the top-ten 23 times, with his best finish in second position in 1953 at Phoenix. In his last race, at the Indy 500, he drove the innovative John Crosthwaite designed Harvey Aluminium Special ‘roller skate car’ with the then pioneering low profile, wide racing tyres and a stock Chevrolet engine.

== USAC director ==
Carter retired from competition in 1956 to take the Competition Director position for USAC. He returned to competition in 1959 after Henry Banks took over the position.

== Career awards ==
- Carter was inducted into the Fresno County Athletic Hall of Fame in 1967.
- Carter was inducted in the National Sprint Car Hall of Fame in 1991.
- Carter was inducted in the National Midget Auto Racing Hall of Fame in 1989.

== Indianapolis 500 results ==
Year	Car	Start	Qual	Rank	Finish	Laps	Led	Retired	Chassis	Engine
1948	16	29	126.015	11	22	59	0	Lost wheel	Wetteroth	Offy
1949	17	5	128.233	12	14	182	0	Spun T3	Stevens	Offy
1950	18	13	131.666	12	12	133	0	Flagged	Stevens	Offy
1951	27	4	133.749	15	8	180	0	Flagged	Diedt	Offy
1952	1	6	135.522	16	4	200	0	Running	Lesovsky	Offy
1953	4	27	135.267	31	24	94	0	Ignition	Lesovsky	Offy
1953	3	-	-	-	3rd*	200	0	Running	Kurtis Kraft	Offy
1954	16	8	138.238	20	15	196	0	Flagged	Kurtis Kraft	Offy
	34	-	-	-	4**	200	0	Running	Kurtis Kraft	Offy
1955	98	18	139.330	19	11	197	0	Flagged	Kuzma	Offy
1959	37	12	142.795	17	7	200	0	Running	Kurtis Kraft	Offy
1960	17	27	142.631	28	12	200	0	Running	Kuzma	Offy
1963	83	15	148.002	30	23	100	0	Rod	Mickey Thompson	Chevrolet
Totals						1741	0			

Starts	11
Poles	0
Front Row	0
Wins	0
Top 5	3
Top 10	5
Retired	4

* shared drive with Sam Hanks

** shared drive with Troy Ruttman

- Carter drove 1,741 laps or 4,352.5 miles (7,004.7 km) at Indianapolis without leading a lap. This currently ranks 5th on the all-time list.

== Complete Formula One World Championship results ==
(key)

Year	Entrant	Chassis	Engine	1	2	3	4	5	6	7	8	9	10	WDC	Points
1950	Murrell Belanger	Stevens	Offenhauser L4	GBR	MON	500; 12	SUI	BEL	FRA	ITA				NC	0
1951	Mobiloil / Rotary Engineering	Diedt Tuffanelli Derrico	Offenhauser L4	SUI	500; 8	BEL	FRA	GBR	GER	ITA	ESP			NC	0
1952	Belanger Motors	Lesovsky	Offenhauser L4	SUI	500; 4	BEL	FRA	GBR	GER	NED	ITA			15th	3
1953	Bardahl / Ed Walsh	Kurtis Kraft 4000	Offenhauser L4	ARG	500; 3 †	NED	BEL	FRA	GBR	GER	SUI	ITA		13th=	2
1954	Automobile Shippers / Casaroll	Kurtis Kraft 500A	Offenhauser L4	ARG	500; 4 *	BEL	FRA	GBR	GER	SUI	ITA	ESP		23rd=	1.5
1955	J.C. Agajanian	Kuzma Indy Roadster	Offenhauser L4	ARG	MON	500; 11	BEL	NED	GBR	ITA				NC	0
1959	Smokey Yunick	Kurtis Kraft 500H	Offenhauser L4	MON	500; 7	NED	FRA	GBR	GER	POR	ITA	USA		NC	0
1960	Thompson / Ensley & Murphy	Kuzma Indy Roadster	Offenhauser L4	ARG	MON	500; 12	NED	BEL	FRA	GBR	POR	ITA	USA	NC	0

† Indicates shared drive with Sam Hanks after retiring his own car.
* Indicates shared drive with Troy Ruttman. Carter's own car finished 15th after being taken over by Marshall Teague, Jimmy Jackson and Tony Bettenhausen.

== 24 Hours of Le Mans results ==
Year	Team	Co-Driver	Car	Class	Laps	Pos.	Class Pos.
1952	(United States) Briggs Cunningham	(United States) Phil Walters	Cunningham C-4RK	S 8.0		DNF (engine, 8hr)	
