= Cecil Green (racing driver) =

American racing driver (1919–1951)

- Born: Judge Cecil Holt; September 30, 1919 Dallas, Texas, U.S.
- Died: July 29, 1951 (aged 31) Winchester, Indiana, U.S.

Champ Car career
- 14 races run over 2 years
- Years active: 1950–1951
- Best finish: 4th – 1950
- First race: 1950 Indianapolis 500 (Indianapolis)
- Last race: 1951 Darlington 250 (Darlington)
Wins	Podiums	Poles
0	4	0

Formula One World Championship career
- Active years: 1950–1951
- Team: Kurtis Kraft
- Entries: 2
- Championships: 0
- Wins: 0
- Podiums: 0
- Career points: 3
- Pole positions: 0
- Fastest laps: 0
- First entry: 1950 Indianapolis 500
- Last entry: 1951 Indianapolis 500

Cecil Green (né Judge Cecil Holt; September 30, 1919 – July 29, 1951) was an American racecar driver from Dallas, Texas.

== Racing career ==
Green won 34 midget races between 1948 and 1950 in Oklahoma and Missouri, and several more in Texas. He won the 1949 Oklahoma City and Southwest AAA titles. He won in seven different Offenhauser cars. Green placed fourth in his first Indianapolis 500 in 1950. He finished 22nd in the 1951 Indianapolis 500.

Green was killed while attempting to qualify for an AAA sprint car race at Funk's Speedway in Winchester, Indiana on July 29, 1951, a day which became known as "Black Sunday".

Green was a World War II veteran, having enlisted in the United States Army in Houston in April 1942. At that time he was a married man residing at an unincorporated section of Harris County – the same county where the Houston metropolitan area lies. In the United States Army Green reached the rank of corporal, becoming a Fifth Grade Technician in the Ordnance Department.

== Career award ==
- Green was inducted in the National Midget Auto Racing Hall of Fame in 2003.

== Indy 500 results ==
Year	Car	Start	Qual	Rank	Finish	Laps	Led	Retired
1950	54	12	132.910	2	4	137	0	Running
1951	4	10	131.892	32	22	80	5	Rod
Totals						217	5	

Starts	2
Poles	0
Front Row	0
Wins	0
Top 5	1
Top 10	1
Retired	1

== World Championship career summary ==
The Indianapolis 500 was part of the FIA World Championship from 1950 through 1960. Drivers competing at Indy during those years were credited with World Championship points and participation. Green participated in two World Championship races. He started on the pole 0 times, won 0 races, set 0 fastest laps, and finished on the podium 0 times. He accumulated a total of three championship points.

Records
Preceded by Alberto Ascari; 31 years, 312 days (1950 Monaco GP)	Youngest driver to score points in Formula One; 30 years, 242 days (1950 Indianapolis 500)	Succeeded by Mike Nazaruk; 29 years, 239 days (1951 Indianapolis 500)
