= 1950 Indianapolis 500 =

American motor race

34th Indianapolis 500
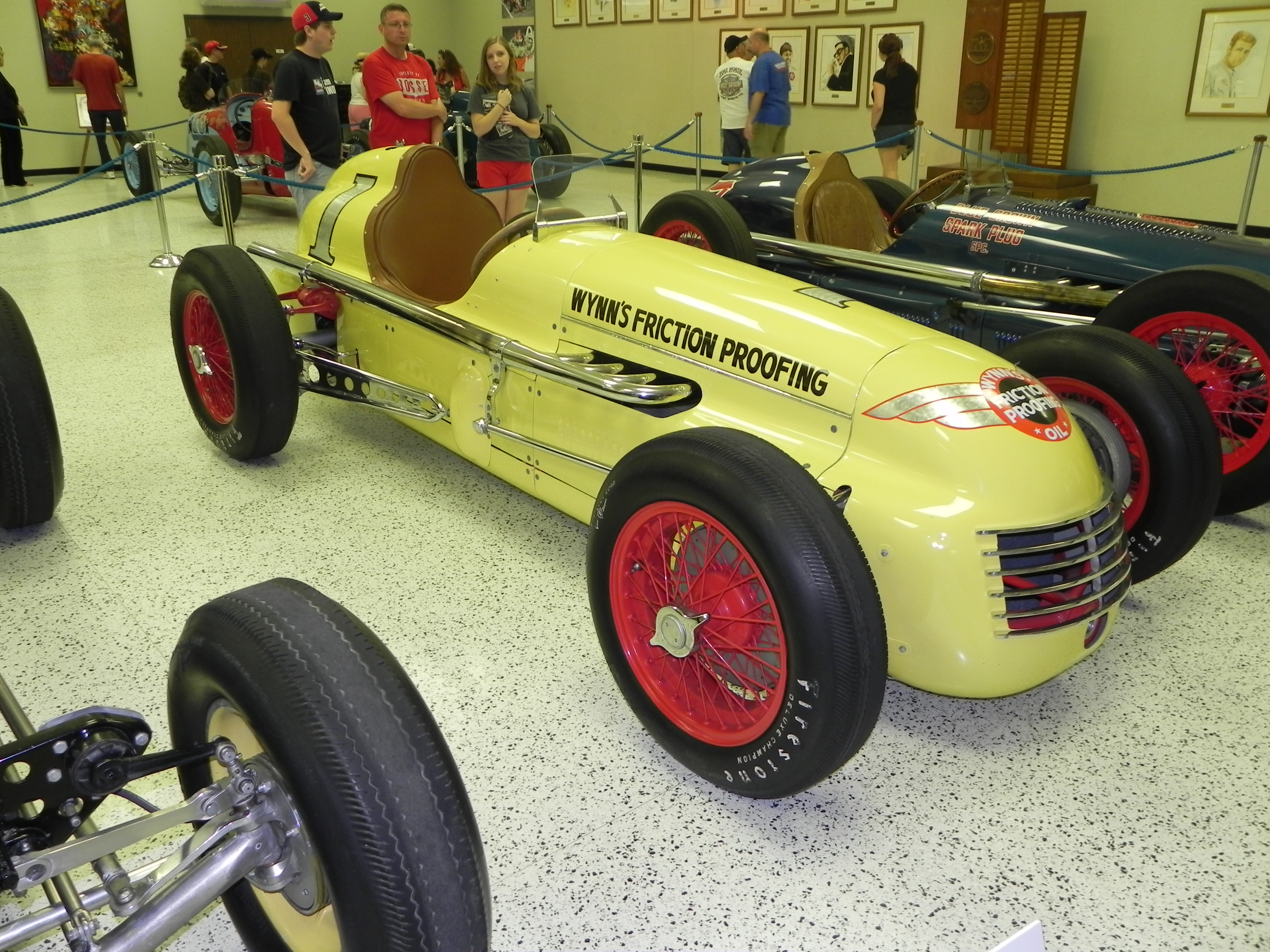

Indianapolis Motor Speedway

Indianapolis 500
- Sanctioning body: AAA
- Date: May 30, 1950
- Winner: Johnnie Parsons
- Winning Entrant: Frank Kurtis
- Winning Chief Mechanic: Harry Stephens
- Winning time: 2:46:55.97
- Average speed: 124.002 mph (199.562 km/h)
- Pole position: Walt Faulkner
- Pole speed: 134.343 mph (216.204 km/h)
- Most laps led: Johnnie Parsons (115)

Pre-race
- Pace car: Mercury
- Pace car driver: Benson Ford
- Starter: Seth Klein
- Honorary referee: Clarence S. Beesemyer
- Estimated attendance: 175,000

Chronology
Previous	Next
1949	1951

The 34th International 500-Mile Sweepstakes was held at the Indianapolis Motor Speedway on Tuesday, May 30, 1950. The event was sanctioned by the AAA and served as the premier event on the calendar of the 1950 AAA National Championship Trail. For the first time, the race was included as a points-paying event towards the FIA-sanctioned World Drivers' Championship. The race was originally scheduled for 200 laps (500 miles), but was stopped after 138 laps (345 miles) due to rain.

A rumor circulated in racing circles during and after this race that Johnnie Parsons's team discovered an irreparable crack in the engine block on race morning. The discovery supposedly precipitated Parsons to charge for the lap leader prizes. Presumably, he set his sights on leading as many laps as possible before the engine inevitably was to fail. Furthermore, the race ending early due to rain supposedly saved Parsons's day allowing him to secure the victory before the engine let go. However, the engine block crack was proved to be an urban myth, and it was said to be a very minor but acceptable level of porosity, which did not significantly affect the performance.

Parsons's win saw him score 9 points and move to a temporary first-place tie (after 3 races on the Formula One season calendar) in the first ever World Drivers' Championship, alongside Nino Farina and Juan Manuel Fangio, and also saw him become the first American to win a World Championship race. Parsons is one of only three drivers to have won his first World Championship race, the other two being Farina, who won the first World Championship race (the 1950 British Grand Prix, 17 days earlier) and Giancarlo Baghetti, who won the 1961 French Grand Prix. Despite the 500 being his only race in the 1950 World Championship, it would be enough to see him finish the championship 6th in points.

During the month, Clark Gable and Barbara Stanwyck were at the track to film scenes for the film To Please a Lady. Stanwyck was on hand in victory lane after the race for the traditional celebratory kiss to the winner. During 1951 a young Mario Andretti saw the film in his native Italy - where it was titled Indianapolis - an event which exposed the future Indianapolis 500 winner and four-time National Champion to the race for the first time.

== Time trials ==
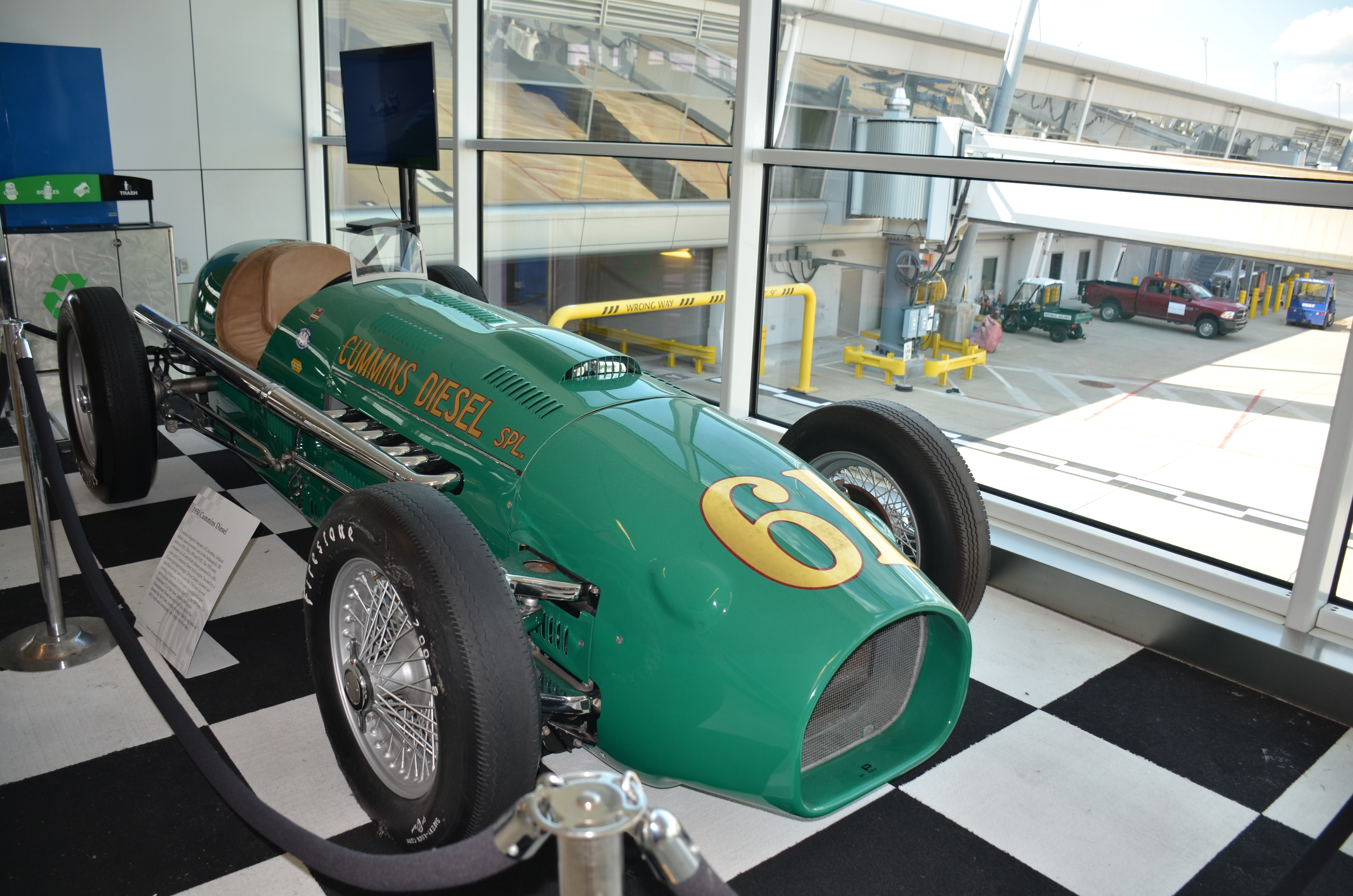
1950 Cummins Diesel

Time trials was scheduled for six days.

- Saturday May 13: Walt Faulkner won the pole position with a record run of 134.343 mph.
- Sunday May 14
- Saturday May 20
- Sunday May 21: The third day of time trials saw six cars complete runs. Myron Fohr (131.714 mph) was the fastest of the afternoon. Charles Van Acker was ruled physically disqualified.
- Saturday May 27: The day began with 11 spots open in the grid.
- Sunday May 28: Only one driver managed to bump his way into the field. Johnny McDowell bumped Cliff Griffith, while 15 other cars failed to make the field. The two Novi entries failed to qualify – Chet Miller had engine trouble in one of the cars, while the other snapped a supercharger shaft. Rain and two crashes cut the track time to less than three hours. Cy Marshall was among the few left in line when time trials closed at 6 p.m.

== Starting grid ==
Row	Inside		Middle		Outside	
1	98	(United States) Walt Faulkner R	28	(United States) Fred Agabashian	31	(United States) Mauri Rose W
2	5	(United States) George Connor	1	(United States) Johnnie Parsons	49	(United States) Jack McGrath
3	69	(United States) Duke Dinsmore	14	(United States) Tony Bettenhausen	17	(United States) Joie Chitwood
4	3	(United States) Bill Holland W	59	(United States) Pat Flaherty R	54	(United States) Cecil Green R
5	18	(United States) Duane Carter	21	(United States) Spider Webb	81	(United States) Jerry Hoyt R
6	2	(United States) Myron Fohr	24	(United States) Bayliss Levrett	45	(United States) Dick Rathmann R
7	7	(United States) Paul Russo	4	(United States) Walt Brown	12	(United States) Henry Banks
8	67	(United States) Bill Schindler R	8	(United States) Lee Wallard	55	(United States) Troy Ruttman
9	23	(United States) Sam Hanks	15	(United States) Mack Hellings	22	(United States) Jimmy Davies R
10	76	(United States) Jim Rathmann	27	(United States) Walt Ader R	77	(United States) Jackie Holmes
11	75	(United States) Gene Hartley R	61	(United States) Jimmy Jackson	62	(United States) Johnny McDowell

R Indianapolis 500 rookie
W Indianapolis 500 winner

== Box score ==
Finish	Grid	No.	Driver	Constructor	Qualifying		Laps	Time/Retired	Points	
Finish	Grid	No.	Driver	Constructor	Speed	Rank	Laps	Time/Retired	USAC	WDC
1	5	1	(United States) Johnnie Parsons	Kurtis Kraft-Offenhauser	132.04	8	138	124.002 mph	690	9^{1}
2	10	3	(United States) Bill Holland W	Diedt-Offenhauser	130.48	21	137	-1 Lap	552	6
3	3	31	(United States) Mauri Rose W	Diedt-Offenhauser	132.31	6	137	-1 Lap	483	4
4	12	54	(United States) Cecil Green R	Kurtis Kraft-Offenhauser	132.91	2	137	-1 Lap	414	3
5	9	17	(United States) Joie Chitwood (Tony Bettenhausen Laps 86–136)	Kurtis Kraft-Offenhauser	130.75	19	136	-2 Laps	217½; 127½	1; 1
6	23	8	(United States) Lee Wallard	Moore-Offenhauser	132.43	5	136	-2 Laps	276	
7	1	98	(United States) Walt Faulkner R	Kurtis Kraft-Offenhauser	134.34	1	135	-3 Laps	207	
8	4	5	(United States) George Connor	Lesovsky-Offenhauser	132.16	7	135	-3 Laps	172½	
9	19	7	(United States) Paul Russo	Nichels-Offenhauser	130.79	18	135	-3 Laps	138	
10	11	59	(United States) Pat Flaherty R	Kurtis Kraft-Offenhauser	129.60	30	135	-3 Laps	103½	
11	16	2	(United States) Myron Fohr	Marchese-Offenhauser	131.71	11	133	-5 Laps	69	
12	13	18	(United States) Duane Carter	Stevens-Offenhauser	131.66	12	133	-5 Laps	34½	
13	26	15	(United States) Mack Hellings	Kurtis Kraft-Offenhauser	130.68	20	132	-6 Laps		
14	6	49	(United States) Jack McGrath	Kurtis Kraft-Offenhauser	131.86	10	131	Spun Off		
15	24	55	(United States) Troy Ruttman	Lesovsky-Offenhauser	131.91	9	130	8 Laps		
16	31	75	(United States) Gene Hartley R	Langley-Offenhauser	129.21	32	128	10 Laps		
17	27	22	(United States) Jimmy Davies R	Ewing-Offenhauser	130.40	23	128	10 Laps		
18	33	62	(United States) Johnny McDowell	Kurtis Kraft-Offenhauser	129.69	27	128	10 Laps		
19	20	4	(United States) Walt Brown	Kurtis Kraft-Offenhauser	130.45	22	127	11 Laps		
20	14	21	(United States) Spider Webb	Maserati-Offenhauser	129.74	26	126	12 Laps		
21	15	81	(United States) Jerry Hoyt R	Kurtis Kraft-Offenhauser	129.52	31	125	13 Laps		
22	29	27	(United States) Walt Ader R	Rae-Offenhauser	129.94	25	123	15 Laps		
23	30	77	(United States) Jackie Holmes	Olson-Offenhauser	129.69	28	123	Spun Off		
24	28	76	(United States) Jim Rathmann	Wetteroth-Offenhauser	129.95	24	122	16 Laps		
25	21	12	(United States) Henry Banks (Fred Agabashian Laps 72–112)	Maserati-Offenhauser	129.64	29	112	Oil Line		
26	22	67	(United States) Bill Schindler R	Snowberger-Offenhauser	132.69	4	111	Transmission		
27	17	24	(United States) Bayliss Levrett (Bill Cantrell Laps 106–108)	Adams-Offenhauser	131.18	14	108	Oil Pressure		
28	2	28	(United States) Fred Agabashian	Kurtis Kraft-Offenhauser	132.79	3	64	Oil Leak		
29	32	61	(United States) Jimmy Jackson	Kurtis Kraft-Cummins	129.20	33	52	Compressor		
30	25	23	(United States) Sam Hanks	Kurtis Kraft-Offenhauser	131.59	13	42	Oil Pressure		
31	8	14	(United States) Tony Bettenhausen	Diedt-Offenhauser	130.94	16	30	Wheel Bearing		
32	18	45	(United States) Dick Rathmann R	Watson-Offenhauser	130.92	17	25	Stalled		
33	7	69	(United States) Duke Dinsmore	Kurtis Kraft-Offenhauser	131.06	15	10	Oil Leak		

Note: Relief drivers in parentheses

W Former Indianapolis 500 winner

R Indianapolis 500 Rookie

All entrants utilized Firestone tires.

^1 – Includes 1 point for fastest lead lap.

=== Race statistics ===
Lap Leaders
Laps	Leader
1–9	Mauri Rose
10–32	Johnnie Parsons
33	Mauri Rose
34–104	Johnnie Parsons
105–109	Mauri Rose
110–117	Bill Holland
118–138	Johnnie Parsons

Total laps led
Driver	Laps
Johnnie Parsons	115
Mauri Rose	15
Bill Holland	8

Yellow Lights: 7 minutes, 30 seconds
Laps*	Reason
95–97	Bill Schindler spin in turn 3 Jackie Holmes spin in turn 3 (2:40)
135–138	Rain; race ended (4:50)
* – Approximate lap counts

== Notes ==
- Pole position: Walt Faulkner – 4:27.97
- Fastest Lead Lap: Johnnie Parsons – 1:09.77
- Shared drivers:
  - Joie Chitwood (82 laps) and Tony Bettenhausen (54 laps), after Bettenhausen retired. Points for 5th position were shared between the drivers.
  - Henry Banks (71 laps) and Fred Agabashian (41 laps)
  - Bayliss Levrett (105 laps) and Bill Cantrell (3 laps)
- First win for Firestone in the World Championship.

== Qualifying ==
Pos	No	Driver	Constructor	Lap	Gap
1	98	(United States) Walt Faulkner	Kurtis Kraft-Offenhauser	4:27.97	–
2	28	(United States) Fred Agabashian	Kurtis Kraft-Offenhauser	4:31.10	+ 3.13
3	31	(United States) Mauri Rose	Diedt-Offenhauser	4:32.07	+ 4.10
4	5	(United States) George Connor	Lesovsky-Offenhauser	4:32.39	+ 4.42
5	1	(United States) Johnnie Parsons	Kurtis Kraft-Offenhauser	4:32.43	+ 4.46
6	49	(United States) Jack McGrath	Kurtis Kraft-Offenhauser	4:33.00	+ 5.03
7	69	(United States) Duke Dinsmore	Kurtis Kraft-Offenhauser	4:34.67	+ 6.70
8	14	(United States) Tony Bettenhausen	Diedt-Offenhauser	4:34.92	+ 6.95
9	17	(United States) Joie Chitwood	Kurtis Kraft-Offenhauser	4:35.32	+ 7.35
10	3	(United States) Bill Holland	Diedt-Offenhauser	4:35.90	+ 7.93
11	59	(United States) Pat Flaherty	Kurtis Kraft-Offenhauser	4:37.76	+ 9.79
12	54	(United States) Cecil Green	Kurtis Kraft-Offenhauser	4:30.86	+ 2.89
13	18	(United States) Duane Carter	Stevens-Offenhauser	4:33.42	+ 5.45
14	21	(United States) Spider Webb	Maserati-Offenhauser	4:37.46	+ 9.49
15	81	(United States) Jerry Hoyt	Kurtis Kraft-Offenhauser	4:37.95	+ 9.98
16	2	(United States) Myron Fohr	Marchese-Offenhauser	4:33.32	+ 5.35
17	24	(United States) Bayliss Levrett	Adams-Offenhauser	4:34.43	+ 6.46
18	45	(United States) Dick Rathmann	Watson-Offenhauser	4:34.96	+ 6.99
19	7	(United States) Paul Russo	Nichels-Offenhauser	4:35.25	+ 7.28
20	4	(United States) Walt Brown	Kurtis Kraft-Offenhauser	4:35.96	+ 7.99
21	12	(United States) Henry Banks	Maserati-Offenhauser	4:37.68	+ 9.71
22	67	(United States) Bill Schindler	Snowberger-Offenhauser	4:31.31	+ 3.34
23	8	(United States) Lee Wallard	Moore-Offenhauser	4:31.83	+ 3.86
24	55	(United States) Troy Ruttman	Lesovsky-Offenhauser	4:32.91	+ 4.94
25	23	(United States) Sam Hanks	Kurtis Kraft-Offenhauser	4:33.57	+ 5.60
26	15	(United States) Mack Hellings	Kurtis Kraft-Offenhauser	4:35.32	+ 7.35
27	22	(United States) Jimmy Davies	Ewing-Offenhauser	4:36.07	+ 8.10
28	76	(United States) Jim Rathmann	Wetteroth-Offenhauser	4:37.01	+ 9.04
29	27	(United States) Walt Ader	Rae-Offenhauser	4:37.05	+ 9.08
30	77	(United States) Jackie Holmes	Olson-Offenhauser	4:37.57	+ 9.60
31	75	(United States) Gene Hartley	Langley-Offenhauser	4:38.61	+ 10.64
32	61	(United States) Jimmy Jackson	Kurtis Kraft-Cummins	4:38.62	+ 10.65
33	62	(United States) Johnny McDowell	Kurtis Kraft-Offenhauser	4:37.58	+ 9.61

=== First alternate ===
No	Driver	Constructor
66	(United States) Cliff Griffith R	Miller-Offenhauser

=== Non-qualifiers ===
No	Driver	Constructor
9	(United States) Andy Linden R	Bromme-Offenhauser
9	(United States) Bud Rose R	Bromme-Offenhauser
10	(United States) Bill Vukovich R	Maserati-Maserati
10	(United States) Hal Cole	Kurtis-Kraft-Offenhauser
16	(United States) Ted Duncan R	Kurtis-Kraft-Offenhauser
19	(United States) Ralph Pratt R	Bardazon-Offenhauser
19	(United States) Kenny Eaton R	Bardazon-Offenhauser
25	(United States) Johnny Mauro	Alfa Romeo-Alfa Romeo
26	(United States) George Fonder	Diedt-Sparks
29	(United States) Charles Van Acker	Stevens-Offenhauser
33	(United States) Joel Thorne	Kurtis-Kraft-Sparks
34	(United States) Johnny Fedricks R	Kupiec-Offenhauser
36	(United States) George Lynch	Snowberger-Offenhauser
38	(United States) Duke Nalon	Kurtis-Kraft-Novi
39	(United States) Danny Kladis	Maserati-Maserati
41	(United States) Milt Fankhouser	Stevens-Offenhauser
43	(United States) Chet Miller	Kurtis-Kraft-Novi
44	(United States) Bill Cantrell	Kurtis-Kraft-Offenhauser
47	(United States) Ralph Pratt R	Gdula-Offenhauser
51	(United States) Mark Light R	Stevens-Offenhauser
52	(United States) Mark Light R	Meyer-Offenhauser
52	(United States) Dick Frazier R	Meyer-Offenhauser
58	(United States) Billy Devore	Scopa-Offenhauser
63	(United States) Joe James R	Kurtis-Kraft-Offenhauser
63	(United States) Bob Gregg R	Kurtis-Kraft-Offenhauser
64	(United States) Bob Sweikert R	Wetteroth-Offenhauser
65	(United States) Marvin Burke R	Kurtis-Kraft-Duray
65	(United States) Norm Houser	Kurtis-Kraft-Duray
74	(United States) Carl Forberg R	Miller-Offenhauser
78	(United States) Cy Marshall	Miller-Miller
79	(United States) Chuck Leighton R	Cantarano-Wayne
82	(United States) Joe James R	Weidel-Mercury
83	(United States) Al Miller	Miller-Miller
84	(United States) Mike Burch R	Miller-Offenhauser
85	(United States) Manuel Ayulo	Maserati-Offenhauser
85	(United States) Jim Rigsby R	Maserati-Offenhauser
87	(United States) Bill Vukovich R	Rounds Rocket-Offenhauser
99	(United States) Kenny Eaton R	Kurtis-Kraft-Offenhauser
99	(United States) Emil Andres	Kurtis-Kraft-Offenhauser

== World Drivers' Championship ==
1950 Indianapolis 500
Race 3 of 7 in the 1950 Formula One season
← Previous race	Next race →

Race details
- Date: May 30, 1950
- Location: Indianapolis Motor Speedway; Speedway, Indiana
- Course: Permanent racing facility
- Course length: 4.023 km (2.500 miles)
- Distance: 138 laps, 555.224 km (345.000 miles)
- Scheduled distance: 200 laps, 804.672 km (500.000 miles)

=== Background ===
The Indianapolis 500 was included in the FIA World Championship of Drivers from 1950 through 1960. The race was sanctioned by AAA through 1955, and then by USAC beginning in 1956. At the time the new world championship was announced and first organized by the CSI, the United States did not yet have a Grand Prix. Indianapolis Motor Speedway vice president and general manager Theodore E. "Pop" Meyers lobbied that the Indianapolis 500 be selected as the race to represent the country and to pay points towards the world championship.

Drivers competing at the Indianapolis 500 in 1950 through 1960 were credited with participation in and earned points towards the World Championship of Drivers. However, the machines competing at Indianapolis were not necessarily run to Formula One specifications and regulations. The drivers also earned separate points (on a different scale) towards the respective AAA or USAC national championships. No points, however, were awarded by the FIA towards the World Constructors' Championship.

=== Summary ===
The 1950 Indianapolis 500 was round 3 of 7 on the 1950 World Championship. The event, however, failed to attract significant interest from any of the regular competitors on the Grand Prix circuit. Giuseppe Farina, Piero Taruffi, and Franco Rol submitted Maserati entries, but their cars never arrived, and the race took place without any European competitors. Race winner Johnnie Parsons earned 9 points towards the World Championship (8 points for first place, and 1 point for the fastest lap). Despite not competing in any of the other World Championship events, he finished sixth in the final season standings.

Parsons is one of only three drivers to win on their WDC debut. The other two are Farina, who won the inaugural World Championship race – the 1950 British Grand Prix, 17 days earlier – and Giancarlo Baghetti, who won the 1961 French Grand Prix.

==== World Drivers' Championship standings after the race ====
Change	Pos	Driver	Points
	1	(Italy) Giuseppe Farina	9
	2	(Argentina) Juan Manuel Fangio	9
31	3	(United States) Johnnie Parsons	9
1	4	(Italy) Luigi Fagioli	6
1	5	(Italy) Alberto Ascari	6

- Note: Only the top five positions are listed. Only the best four results counted towards the Championship.

== Broadcasting ==
=== Radio ===
The race was carried live on the Mutual Broadcasting System, the precursor to the IMS Radio Network. The broadcast was sponsored by Perfect Circle Piston Rings and Bill Slater served as the anchor. Sid Collins moved into the booth for the first time to serve as analyst, and conducted the victory lane interview at the conclusion of the race. The broadcast feature live coverage of the start, the finish, and live updates throughout the race.

Prior to the race, it was reported that Slater might miss the race, due to illness. WIBC personality Sid Collins was named as a replacement, however, Slater was able to arrive in time for race day. Collins, who had previously served as a turn reporter, was invited to be the co-anchor in the booth. For the first time, Collins interviewed the winner in victory lane at the conclusion of the race. Collins claims he burned his trousers on Parsons's hot exhaust pipe during the interview, which took place in the rain.

Because the race was shortened, Mutual had to interrupt Queen for a Day to cover the finish of the abbreviated event. This was cited by some as a reason why the Speedway would begin flag-to-flag coverage in 1953.

Mutual Broadcasting System
Booth Announcers	Turn Reporters	Pit reporters
Booth Announcer: Bill Slater; Analyst: Sid Collins	South turns: Easy Gwynn; North turns: Jim Shelton	Gordon Graham; Sid Collins (victory lane)

=== Television ===
The race was carried live for the second year in a row on local television on WFBM-TV channel 6 of Indianapolis. Earl Townsend Jr. was the announcer, along with Dick Pittenger and Paul Roberts. After the race, Speedway management disallowed WFBM from broadcasting the race live again, feeling that gate attendance had been negatively affected.

WFBM-TV
Play-by-play	Pit reporters
Announcer: Earl Townsend, Jr; Color: Dick Pittenger	Paul Roberts

Previous race: 1950 Monaco Grand Prix	FIA Formula One World Championship; 1950 season	Next race: 1950 Swiss Grand Prix
Previous race: 1949 Indianapolis 500; Bill Holland	1950 Indianapolis 500; Johnnie Parsons	Next race: 1951 Indianapolis 500; Lee Wallard
Preceded by 121.327 mph (1949 Indianapolis 500)	Record for the Indianapolis 500 fastest average speed 124.002 mph	Succeeded by 126.244 mph (1951 Indianapolis 500)
