= Mack Hellings =

American racecar driver

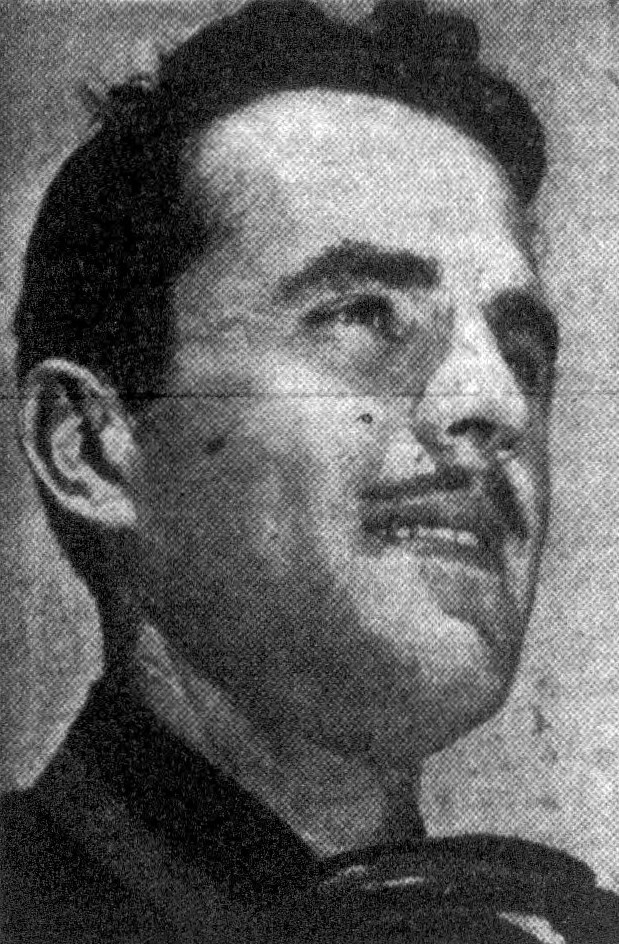
- Hellings, circa 1951
- Born: September 14, 1915
- Died: November 11, 1951 (aged 36)

Formula One World Championship career
- Nationality: (United States) American
- Active years: 1950–1951
- Team(s): Kurtis Kraft, Diedt
- Entries: 2
- Championships: 0
- Wins: 0
- Podiums: 0
- Career points: 0
- Pole positions: 0
- Fastest laps: 0
- First entry: 1950 Indianapolis 500
- Last entry: 1951 Indianapolis 500

Ronald 'Mack' Hellings (September 14, 1915 – November 11, 1951) was an American racecar driver from Fort Dodge, Iowa. He died in a plane crash in Kern County, California in 1951.

== Indy 500 results ==
Year	Car	Start	Qual	Rank	Finish	Laps	Led	Retired
1948	35	21	127.968	6	5	200	0	Running
1949	8	14	128.260	11	16	172	0	Valve
1950	15	26	130.687	20	13	132	0	Flagged
1951	19	23	132.925	22	31	18	0	Piston
Totals						522	0	

Starts	4
Poles	0
Front Row	0
Wins	0
Top 5	1
Top 10	1
Retired	2

== World Championship career summary ==
The Indianapolis 500 was part of the FIA World Championship from 1950 through 1960. Drivers competing at Indy during those years were credited with World Championship points and participation. Hellings participated in two World Championship races, with a best finish of thirteenth.
