= Jackie Holmes =

American racecar driver (1920–1995)

- Born: September 4, 1920
- Died: March 1, 1995 (aged 74)

Formula One World Championship career
- Nationality: (United States) American
- Active years: 1950–1953
- Team(s): Olson, Kurtis Kraft, Maserati, Adams
- Entries: 4 (2 starts)
- Championships: 0
- Wins: 0
- Podiums: 0
- Career points: 0
- Pole positions: 0
- Fastest laps: 0
- First entry: 1950 Indianapolis 500
- Last entry: 1953 Indianapolis 500

Jackie Holmes (born Marion Holmes; September 4, 1920 – March 1, 1995) was an American racecar driver from Indianapolis, Indiana. In 1949 Holmes drove the six-wheeled Pat Clancy Special in a race at the Milwaukee Fairgrounds, finishing fourth. That year, he took the Clancy Special to the 1949 Indianapolis 500, where the rookie driver qualified for the race at 128.087 mph. Holmes and the Clancy Special made 65 laps of the Indy 500 track before the car retired with a drive shaft fault.

== Indy 500 results ==
| Year | Car | Start | Qual | Rank | Finish | Laps | Led | Retired |
|---|---|---|---|---|---|---|---|---|
| 1949 | 57 | 17 | 128.087 | 14 | 22 | 65 | 0 | Drive shaft |
| 1950 | 77 | 30 | 129.697 | 27 | 23 | 123 | 0 | Spun T2 |
| 1953 | 62 | - | - | - | 19 | ? | ? | Oil leak* |
| Totals | | | | | | 188 | 0 | |

* shared drive with Spider Webb and Johnny Thomson

| Starts | 2 |
| Poles | 0 |
| Front Row | 0 |
| Wins | 0 |
| Top 5 | 0 |
| Top 10 | 0 |
| Retired | 2 |

== World Championship career summary ==
The Indianapolis 500 was part of the FIA World Championship from 1950 through 1960. Drivers competing at Indy during those years were credited with World Championship points and participation. Holmes participated in two World Championship races but scored no World Championship points.
