= Gene Hartley =

American racing driver (1926–1993)

- Born: January 28, 1926
- Died: March 13, 1993 (aged 67)

Formula One World Championship career
- Nationality: (United States) American
- Active years: 1950, 1952–1954, 1956–1957, 1959–1960
- Team(s): Kurtis Kraft, Kuzma, Langley, Lesovsky, Ewing
- Entries: 10 (8 starts)
- Championships: 0
- Wins: 0
- Podiums: 0
- Career points: 0
- Pole positions: 0
- Fastest laps: 0
- First entry: 1950 Indianapolis 500
- Last entry: 1960 Indianapolis 500

Leslie Eugene Hartley (January 28, 1926 – March 13, 1993) was an American racecar driver. He was born and died in Roanoke, Indiana.

Hartley was the son of midget car driver Ted Hartley, who competed into his 60s. "Auto racing is all I’ve ever known," Gene once said in an interview at the Indianapolis Motor Speedway.

== Racing career ==
Hartley drove in the AAA and USAC Championship Car series, racing in the 1950 and 1952–1962 seasons with 33 starts. He raced in ten Indianapolis 500 races, in each year but 1955 and 1958. His best finish at Indy was tenth in 1957, although he finished eleventh three times. He finished in the top-ten nine times, with his best finish in second position in 1956 at Langhorne Speedway.

Hartley was the 1959 USAC National Midget Series champion. His 33 USAC feature wins were eighth best all-time.

== Promoter ==
Hartley co-promoted with Leroy Warriner at the Indianapols Speedrome on Kitley Avenue in Indianapolis after his retirement. They hosted midget races at the track that was specifically built for the small cars.

== Career award ==
- Hartley was inducted in the National Midget Auto Racing Hall of Fame in 1985.

== Indy 500 results ==
Year	Car	Start	Qual	Rank	Finish	Laps	Led	Retired
1950	75	31	129.213	32	16	128	0	Flagged
1952	67	18	134.343	24	28	65	0	Exhaust pipe
1953	41	13	137.263	9	28	53	0	Crash T4
1954	31	17	139.061	10	23	168	0	Engine
1955	28	—	—	—	—	—	—	Did not qualify
1956	82	22	142.846	15	11	196	0	Flagged
1957	22	14	141.271	16	10	200	0	Running
1958	24	—	—	—	—	—	—	Did not qualify
1959	88	9	143.575	10	11	200	0	Running
1960	48	24	143.896	16	14	196	0	Flagged
1961	28	15	144.817	22	11	198	0	Flagged
1962	67	20	146.969	15	32	17	0	Crash FS
Totals						1421	0	

Entries	12
Starts	10
Poles	0
Front row	0
Wins	0
Top 5	0
Top 10	1
Retired	4

== World Championship career summary ==
The Indianapolis 500 was part of the FIA World Championship from 1950 through 1960. Drivers competing at Indy during those years were credited with World Championship points and participation. Hartley entered ten World Championship races and started eight of them, with a best finish of tenth.
