= Emil Diedt =

American auto racing builder

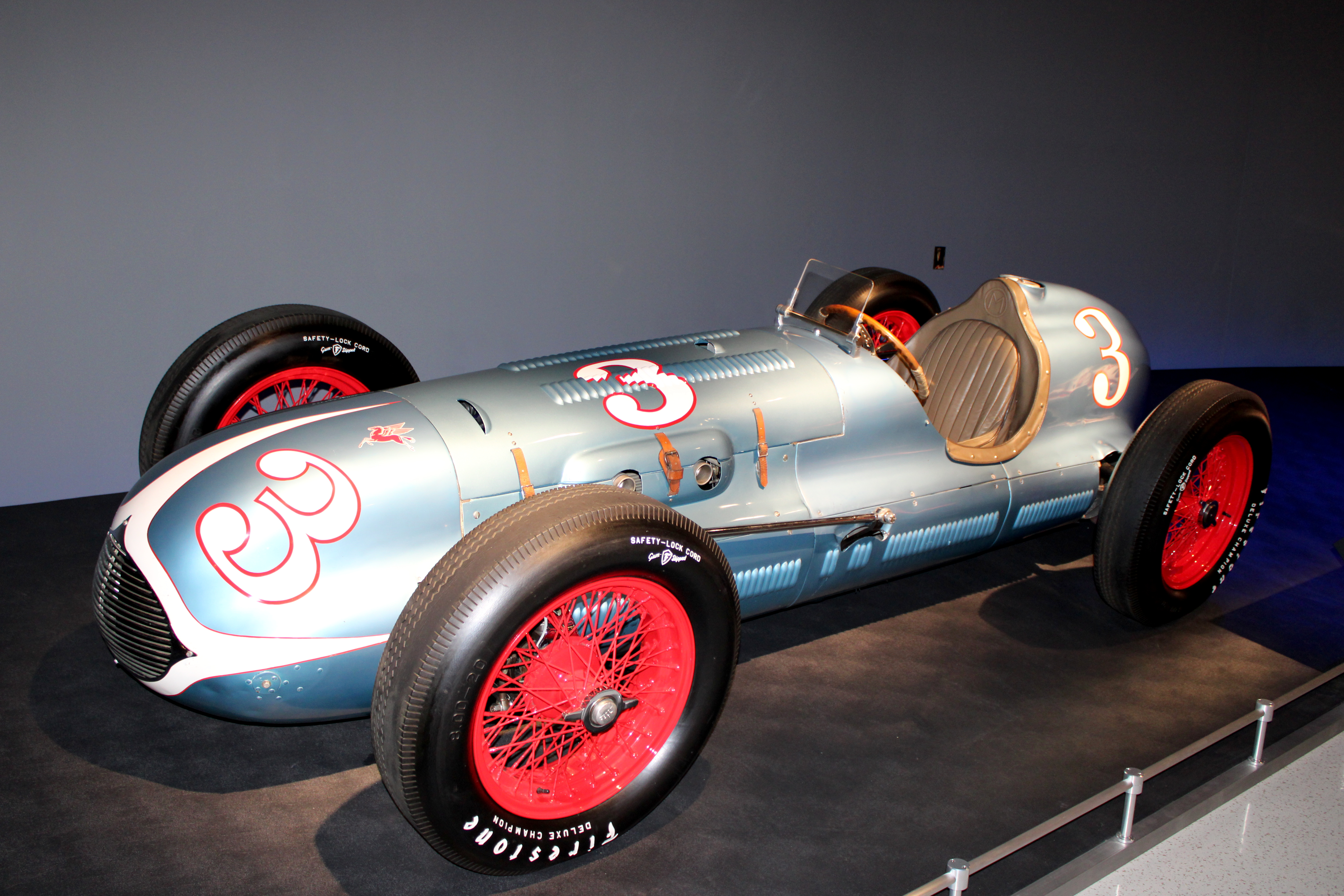
- Diedt-built winner of the 1947 and 1948 Indianapolis 500s
- Born: Emil Albert Didt; March 17, 1897; East Prussia, Kingdom of Prussia, German Empire
- Died: December 8, 1980 (aged 83); Los Angeles, California, U.S.
- Occupation: Auto racing builder

Emil Albert Diedt (born Emil Albert Didt, March 17, 1897 – December 8, 1980) was an American race car builder. He specialized in body-building and metalwork, and his chassis won the Indianapolis 500 in 1947 and 1948 with Mauri Rose, and in 1949 with Bill Holland. Diedt's cars ran with Offenhauser engines, and the three victories were the only major American open-wheel racing (AAA) wins for him.

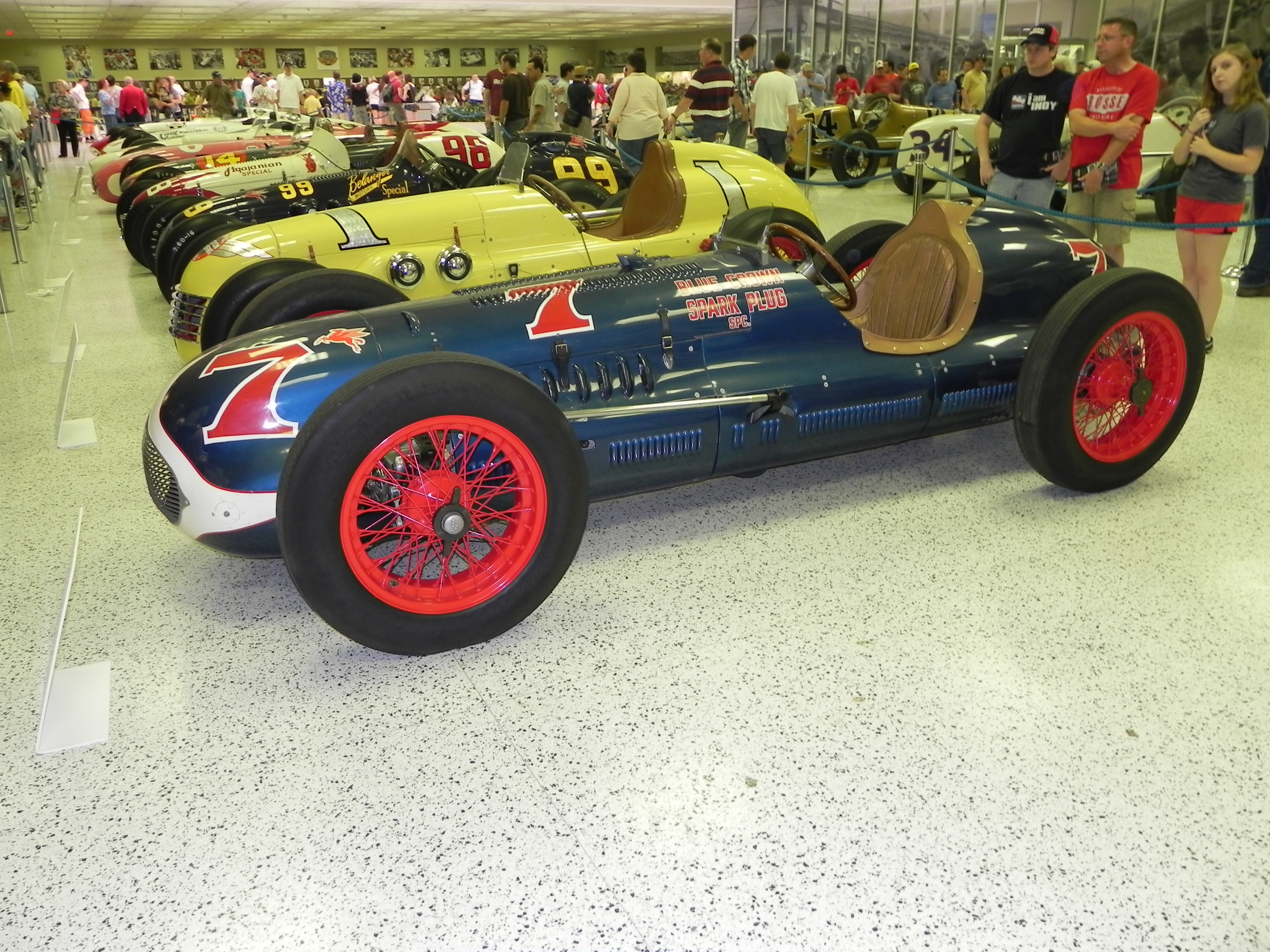
Diedt-constructed winner of the 1949 Indianapolis 500

The 1947 and 1948 winning car, called "Blue Crown Special", had the particularity of being front-wheel driven. Diedt's cars competed in the FIA World Championship from 1950 to 1952, as the Indianapolis 500 was part of the championship during those years. The last participation in the Indianapolis 500 for a Diedt chassis was in 1952, and their last qualifying attempt was in 1953.

== Personal life ==
Born Emil Albert Didt, Diedt emigrated to the U.S. as a 16-year old, accompanying his 19-year old brother. Both had been working as sailors. Diedt obtained U.S. citizenship after the First World War.

== Select Indianapolis 500 results ==
Season	Driver	Grid	Classification	Points	Note	Race Report
1950	Tony Bettenhausen	8	Ret		Wheel Bearing	Report
1950	Bill Holland	10	2	6		Report
1950	Mauri Rose	3	3	4		Report
1951	Mack Hellings	23	Ret		Engine	Report
1951	Mauri Rose	5	Ret		Accident	Report
1951	Duane Carter	4	8			Report
1951	Tony Bettenhausen	9	Ret		Spun Off	Report
1952	Tony Bettenhausen	30	Ret		Oil Pressure	Report
