= Bill Holland =

American racing driver (1907–1984)

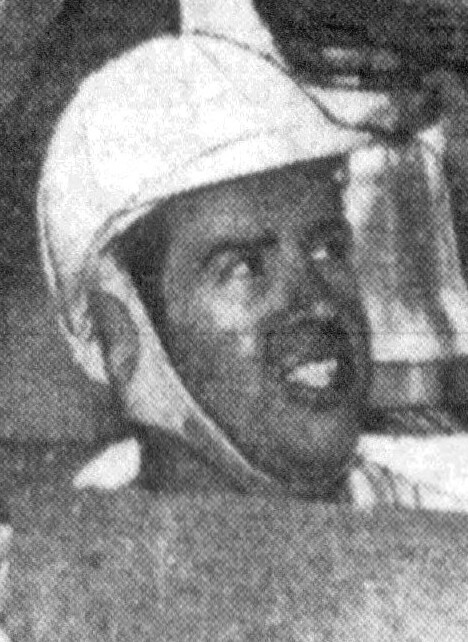
- Holland at the 1949 Indianapolis 500
- Born: Willard Saulsbury Holland; December 18, 1907 Philadelphia, Pennsylvania, U.S.
- Died: May 20, 1984 (aged 76) Tucson, Arizona, U.S.

Championship titles
- AAA Eastern Big Car (1941); Major victories Indianapolis 500 (1949)

Champ Car career
- 66+ races run over 9 years
- Best finish: 2nd (1947)
- First race: 1946 Williams Grove Race #1 (Williams Grove)
- Last race: 1953 Syracuse 100 (Syracuse)
- First win: 1946 Selinsgrove Race #1 (Selinsgrove)
- Last win: 1949 Indianapolis 500 (Indianapolis)
Wins	Podiums	Poles
20	36	2

NASCAR Cup Series career
- 8 races run over 2 years
- Best finish: 55th (1951)
- First race: 1951 Race 1 (Daytona Beach)
- Last race: 1952 Motor City 250 (Detroit)
Wins	Top tens	Poles
0	2	0

Formula One World Championship career
- Active years: 1950, 1953–1954
- Team(s): Diedt, Kurtis Kraft
- Entries: 3 (2 starts)
- Championships: 0
- Wins: 0
- Podiums: 1
- Career points: 6
- Pole positions: 0
- Fastest laps: 0
- First entry: 1950 Indianapolis 500
- Last entry: 1954 Indianapolis 500

Willard Saulsbury Holland (December 18, 1907 – May 20, 1984) was an American racing driver from Philadelphia, Pennsylvania. He won the Indianapolis 500 in 1949 and finished second in 1947, 1948, and 1950. He was runner-up in the 1947 American Automobile Association (AAA) National Championship.

== Background ==
Holland was born on December 18, 1907, the son of fireman and former professional baseball player Willard Holland. He was excellent at skating and tried out for the 1932 Olympics.

== Driving career ==
=== Early career ===
Holland began achieving notable results in big cars during 1937. He recorded his first win on July 30, 1938, at Mineola, New York. He won three times in 1939 and nine times in 1940. Holland finished second to Joie Chitwood in the 1940 AAA Eastern Big Car championship and he won the championship in 1941. No racing happened in the United States between 1942 and 1945 due to World War II.

In 1946, Holland won 15 Eastern and 1 Midwestern "big car" (now sprint car) races to finish fourth in the AAA national championship. On July 20, 1946, Holland won the first race at Selinsgrove Speedway in an American Automobile Association-sanctioned event.

=== Championship car career ===
Holland nearly won the 1947 Indianapolis 500 as a rookie, but slowed and allowed teammate Mauri Rose to pass him seven laps from the end, mistakenly believing that Rose was a lap down.

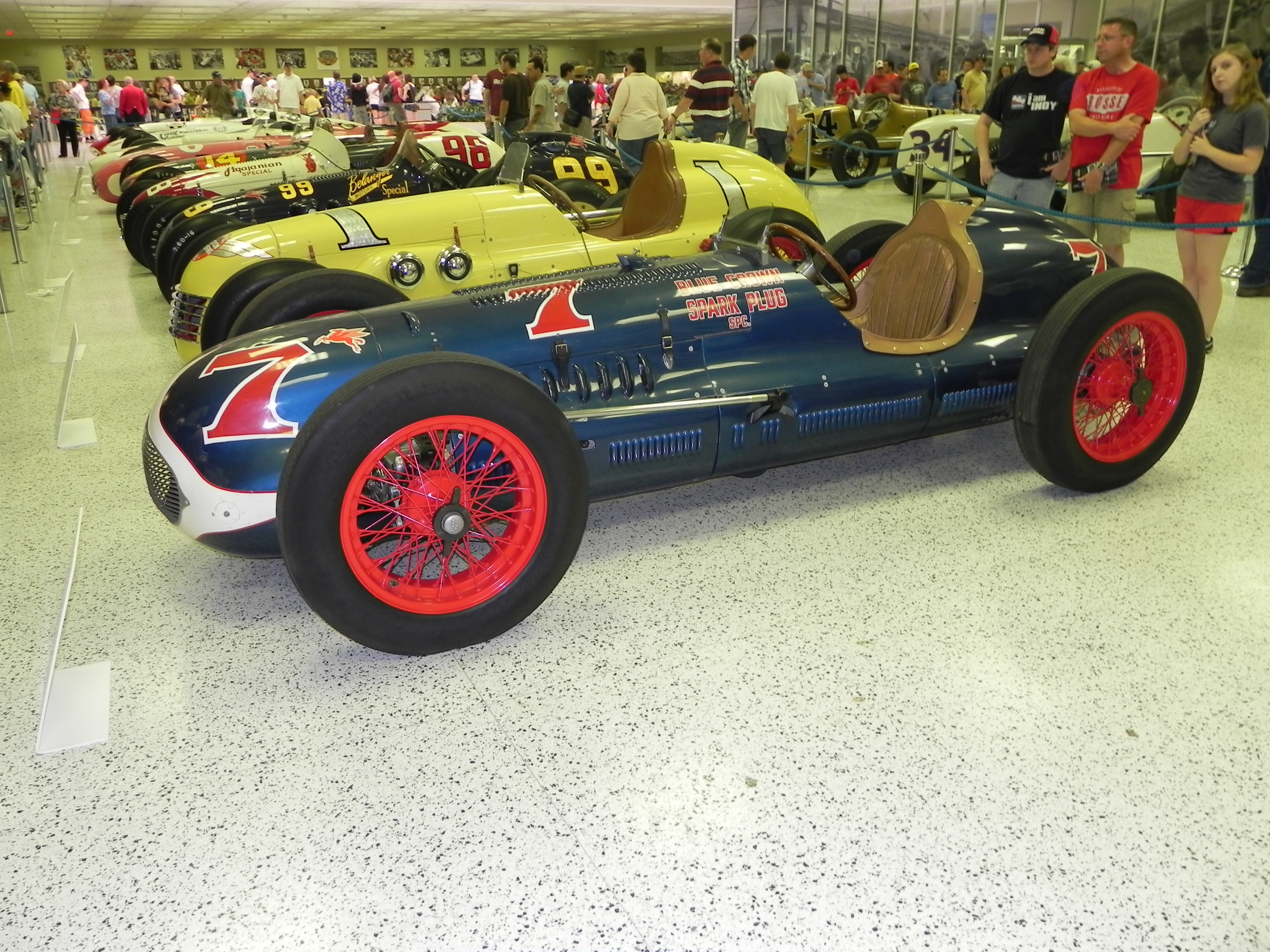
Holland's winning car from the 1949 Indianapolis 500

In 1949, Holland led late in the race when Rose (still teammate to Holland on Lou Moore's Blue Crown Spark Plug team) began to slowly close on Holland. Moore saw what was happening out on the track and hung out a pit board ordering both drivers to hold their respective positions to the finish. Rose picked up the pace, closing on Holland. But with eight laps to go, Rose suffered a magneto failure and Holland cruised to the victory. When Rose returned to the pits, Moore fired Rose on the spot. 1950 saw him a lap down on lap 138 in second place to Johnnie Parsons when rain fell and ended the race.

On November 14, 1951, Holland was suspended from AAA Indy Car racing for one year after competing in a three-lap Lion's Charity race at Opa-locka, Florida which was a NASCAR event. The American Automobile Association, at the time the sanctioning body for Indy car races, had a strict rule forbidding its drivers from participating in any races other than their own and would blacklist violators. He returned to Indy car racing in 1953.

Holland raced until 1965. He is believed to have achieved more than 40 sprint car feature wins and 150 podiums.

=== World Drivers' Championship career ===
The AAA/USAC-sanctioned Indianapolis 500 was included in the FIA World Drivers' Championship from 1950 through 1960. Drivers competing at Indianapolis during those years were credited with World Drivers' Championship participation, and were eligible to score WDC points alongside those which they may have scored towards the AAA/USAC National Championship.

Holland participated in two World Drivers' Championship races at Indianapolis. He finished in the top-three once, and scored six World Drivers' Championship points.

== Life after racing and death ==
Holland and his wife Myra ran skating rinks in Bridgeport, Connecticut. They lived briefly in Colorado Springs, Colorado before moving to Tucson, Arizona in the early 1970s.

Holland was diagnosed with Alzheimer's disease in November 1983 and died from complications of the disease on May 20, 1984. He had remained active throughout his life and would regularly ride a bicycle for 50 miles per day until a year before his death.

== Awards and honors ==
Holland has been inducted into the following halls of fame:

- Auto Racing Hall of Fame (1992)
- National Sprint Car Hall of Fame (2005)

In addition, the inaugural USAC Silver Crown Series race held at Selinsgrove Speedway was named the Bill Holland Classic. The race was 74 laps long as it was the 74th year after Holland's victory opened the track.

== Motorsports career results ==
=== AAA Championship Car results ===
Year	1	2	3	4	5	6	7	8	9	10	11	12	13	14	Pos	Points
1946	INDY	LAN	ATL	ISF	MIL	GOS									4th	1,280
1947	INDY; 2	MIL; 1	LAN; 1	ATL; 2	BAI; 2	MIL; 18	GOS; 14	MIL; 8	PIK	SPR; 9	ARL; DNQ				2nd	1,610
1948	ARL; DNS	INDY; 2	MIL; 9	LAN; 11	MIL; DNQ	SPR	MIL	DUQ	ATL	PIK	SPR	DUQ			7th	840
1949	ARL	INDY; 1	MIL; 9	TRE; 16	SPR; 4	MIL	DUQ; 2	PIK	SYR; DNP	DET; 7	SPR; 12	LAN; 9	SAC; 13	DMR	3rd	1,420
1950	INDY; 2	MIL	LAN	SPR	MIL	PIK	SYR	DET	SPR	SAC	PHX	BAY	DAR		13th	552
1953	INDY; 15	MIL	SPR	DET	SPR; DNQ	MIL; 18	DUQ	PIK	SYR; 5	ISF	SAC	PHX			34th	100
1954	INDY; DNQ	MIL	LAN	DAR	SPR	MIL	DUQ	PIK	SYR	ISF	SAC	PHX	LVG		-	0

- 1946 table only includes results of the six races run to "championship car" specifications. Points total includes the 71 races run to "big car" specifications. Holland did not compete in any championship car events, however, he competed in no less than 41 "big car" events, winning 17. These efforts enabled Holland to finish the anomalous 1946 season ranked fourth in points.

=== Indianapolis 500 results ===
Year	Car	Start	Qual	Rank	Finish	Laps	Led	Retired
1947	16	8	128.755	1	2	200	143	Running
1948	2	2	129.515	3	2	200	0	Running
1949	7	4	128.673	9	1	200	146	Running
1950	3	10	130.482	21	2	137	8	Running
1953	49	28	137.868	2	15	177	0	Cam gear
Totals						914	297	

Starts	5
Poles	0
Front Row	1
Wins	1
Top 5	4
Top 10	4
Retired	1

- Although Holland started the 1947 race from the middle of the third row, he posted the fastest qualifying time.

=== FIA World Drivers' Championship results ===
(key)

Year	Chassis	Engine	1	2	3	4	5	6	7	8	9	WDC	Pts
1950	Diedt	Offenhauser	GBR	MON	500; 2	SUI	BEL	FRA	ITA			7th	6
1953	Kurtis Kraft	Offenhauser	ARG	500; 15	NED	BEL	FRA	GBR	GER	SUI	ITA	NC	0

Preceded by Mauri Rose	Indianapolis 500 Winner; 1949	Succeeded by Johnnie Parsons
