= Bayliss Levrett =

American racecar driver (1914–2002)

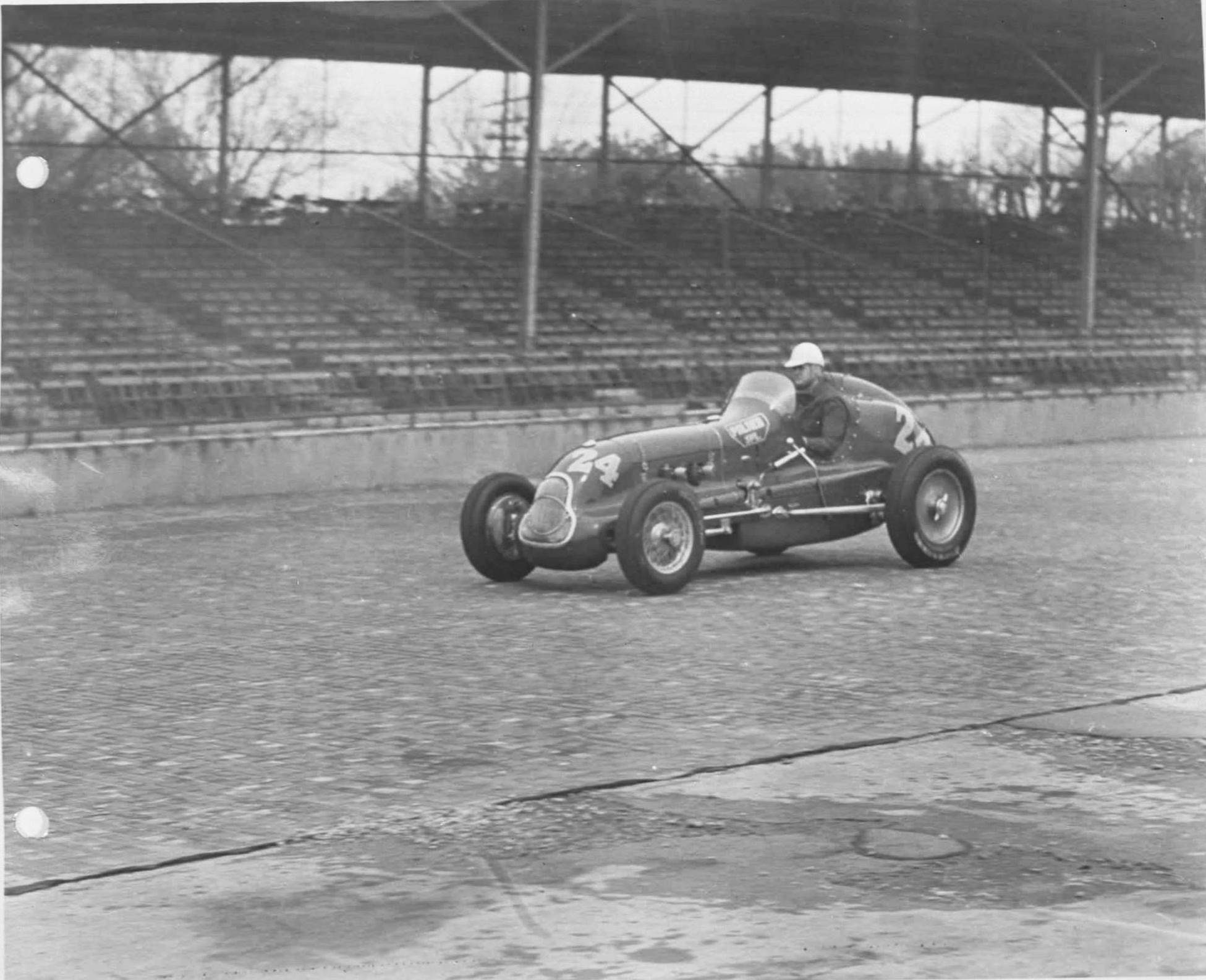
- Levrett in 1950
- Born: February 14, 1914; Jacksonville, Florida, U.S.
- Died: March 13, 2002 (aged 88); Reno, Nevada, U.S.

Formula One World Championship career
- Nationality: (United States) American
- Active years: 1950–1952
- Team(s): Adams, Kurtis Kraft, Silnes
- Entries: 3 (1 start)
- Championships: 0
- Wins: 0
- Podiums: 0
- Career points: 0
- Pole positions: 0
- Fastest laps: 0
- First entry: 1950 Indianapolis 500
- Last entry: 1952 Indianapolis 500

Bayliss Levrett (February 14, 1914 – March 13, 2002) was an American racecar driver from Jacksonville, Florida. He died in Reno, Nevada at the age of 88 after a long battle with Alzheimer's disease.

== Career ==
During his early career, Levrett raced sprint cars, primarily on the west coast. In 1947, he suffered severe burns as a result of a crash. Levrett participated in the 1949 AAA Championship Car season, with his best finish being in fourth at Milwaukee. He took part in the 1949 and 1950 Indianapolis 500, but ended up retiring from both races. The next year, he failed to qualify for the 1951 Indianapolis 500, and did not qualify in 1952 due to a severe crash during practice. The crash caused Levrett to retire from racing.

Levrett opened a transmission shop in 1955, which is now ran by his family. He was inducted into the National Sprint Car Hall of Fame in 2007.

== Indianapolis 500 results ==
Year	Car	Start	Qual	Rank	Finish	Laps	Led	Retired
1949	69	29	129.236	6	24	52	0	Drain plug
1950	24	17	131.181	14	27	108	0	Oil pressure
Totals						160	0	

Starts	2
Poles	0
Front Row	0
Wins	0
Top 5	0
Top 10	0
Retired	2
