= Mike Salay =

American racing driver

Mike Salay (born Michael Leo Szalai; June 10, 1909 – November 14, 1973) was an American racecar driver from South Bend, Indiana. Salay made eight starts in AAA Championship Car in 1948 and 1949 including the 1948 Indianapolis 500. He attempted to qualify again in 1949 but failed to do so. His best finish was sixth at Trenton Speedway in 1949. In 1950, he attempted the June Milwaukee Mile race and failed to qualify. He entered the 1951 Indianapolis 500 but wrecked his car in a practice crash.

== Indy 500 results ==
Year	Car	Start	Qual	Rank	Finish	Laps	Led	Retired
1948	86	31	123.393	24	30	3	0	Stalled
Totals						3	0	

Starts	1
Poles	0
Front Row	0
Wins	0
Top 5	0
Top 10	0
Retired	1
