= Norm Houser =

American racing driver (1915–1996)

Norman Lloyd Houser (December 18, 1915 – December 3, 1996) was an American racecar driver.

== Indy 500 results ==
Year	Car	Start	Qual	Rank	Finish	Laps	Led	Retired
1949	71	24	127.756	20	10	181	0	Flagged
Totals						181	0	

Starts	1
Poles	0
Front Row	0
Wins	0
Top 5	0
Top 10	1
Retired	0
