= Offenhauser =

Racing engine design

Offy Offenhauser Racing Engines
- Logo
- Industry: Automotive
- Founded: 1933
- Founder: Fred H. Offenhauser
- Products: Racing engines
- Website: www.offenhauser.co

The Offenhauser Racing Engine, often shorted to the Offy, was a series of racing engines that dominated American Championship Car racing for more than fifty years. Versions of the engine won the Indianapolis 500 a record 27 times between 1935 and 1976. The engine was also widely used in sprint and midget car racing. The Offenhauser engine was first raced in the early 1930s, and continued to be used in top-level competition through the 1970s and into the early 1980s. It is still popular in vintage racing.

The engine took its name from founder Fred Offenhauser, who originally partnered in the project with Harry Miller. Numerous configurations and displacements were produced over the decades, including I-4, V-8, normally aspirated, and turbocharged configurations. In 1946, the company was sold to Louis Meyer and Dale Drake, at which time they formally became known as Meyer-Drake engines. However, the legacy name "Offenhauser" remained the preferred and most widely-used moniker. In 1975, by which time Meyer had since sold his interests, another derivative engine was introduced called the DGS (Drake-Goossen-Sparks). Considered the final engine which was part of the original Offy lineage, it saw modest success on the Indy car circuit.

== History ==
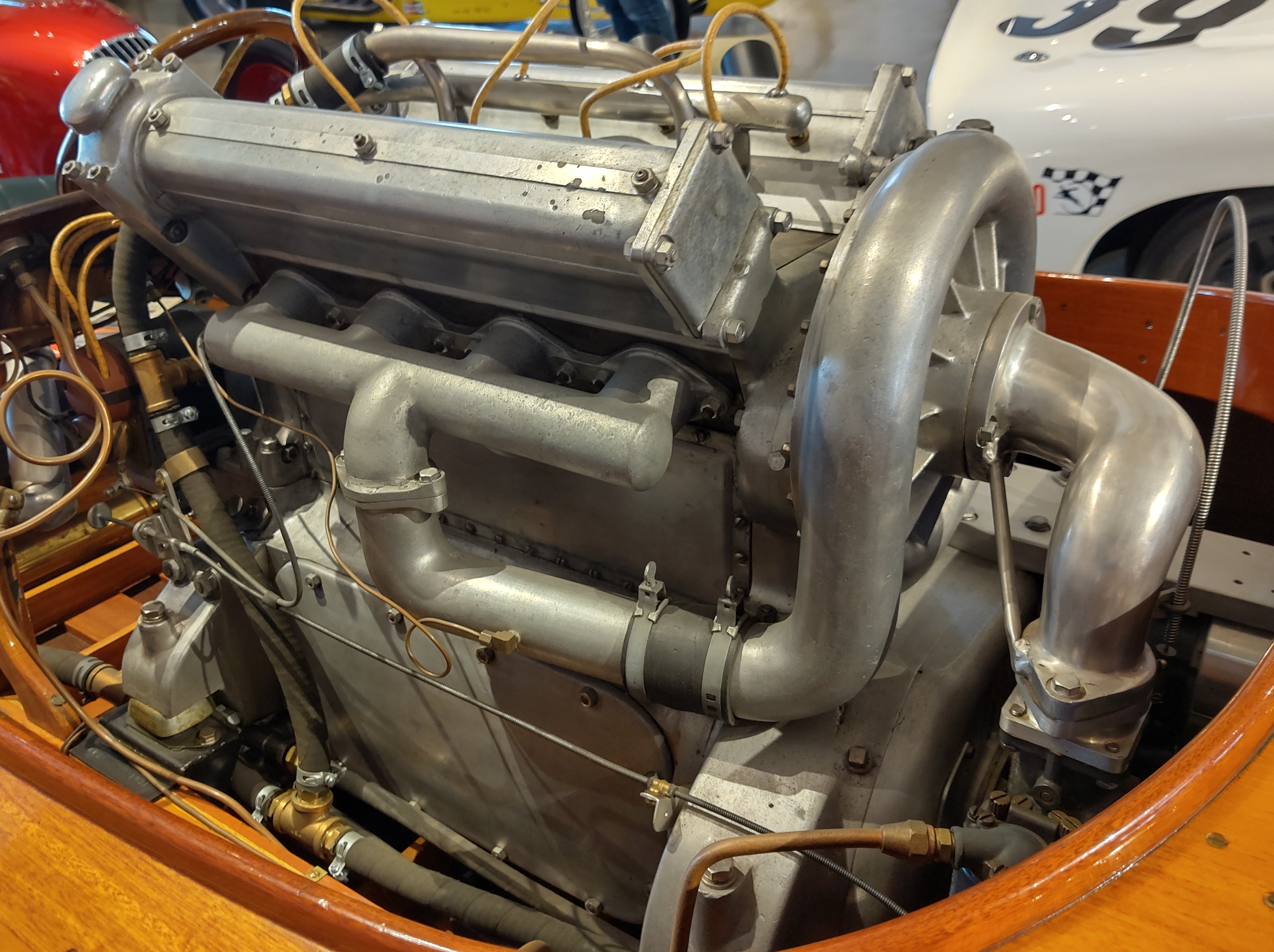
The "Offy" engine was derived from this Miller marine engine

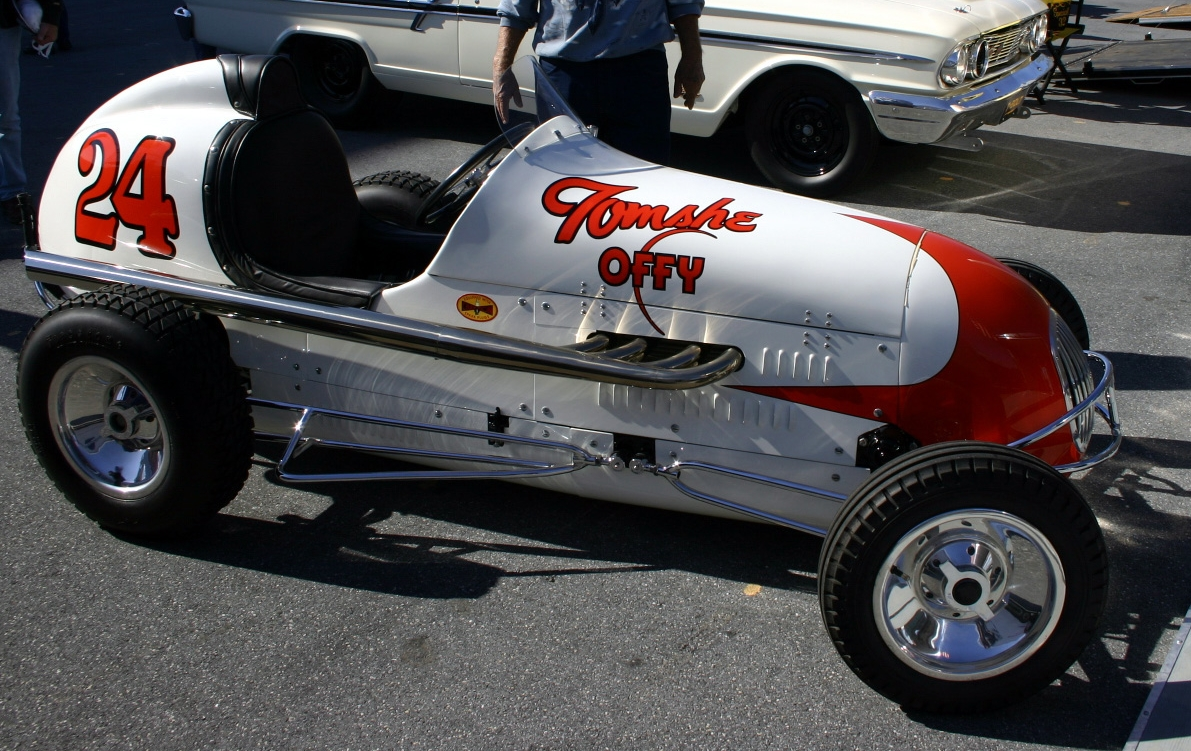
An Offenhauser sprint "midget" racer

The Offenhauser engine, familiarly known as the "Offy", was an overhead cam monoblock 4-stroke internal combustion engine developed by Fred Offenhauser and Harry Arminius Miller. Originally, it was sold as a marine engine. In 1930 a four-cylinder 151 cu in (2.47 L) Miller engine installed in a race car set a new international land speed record of 144.895 mph (233.186 km/h). Miller developed this engine into a twin overhead cam, four-cylinder, four-valve-per-cylinder 220 cu in (3.6 L) racing engine. Variations of this design were used in midgets and sprints into the 1960s, with a choice of carburetion or Hilborn fuel injection. When both Miller and the company to whom he had sold much of the equipment and rights went bankrupt in 1933, Offenhauser opened a shop a block away and bought rights to engines, special tooling and drawings at the bankruptcy auction, and he and other former Miller employees took over production. They and former Miller employee, draftsman Leo Goossen, further developed the Miller engines into the Offenhauser engines.

In 1946, the name Offenhauser and engine designs were sold to Louis Meyer and Dale Drake. It was under Meyer and Drake that the engine dominated the Indianapolis 500 and midget racing in the United States. In 1965, Meyer was bought out by Drake, his wife Eve and their son John. From then until Drake's son John sold the shop to Stewart Van Dyne, the Drake family designed and refined the engine until its final race days.

One of the keys to the Offenhauser engine's success and popularity was its power. A 251.92 cubic inch (4,128.29 cm^{3}) DOHC naturally-aspirated four-cylinder racing Offy with a 15:1 compression ratio and a 4.28125-by-4.375-inch (108.744 mm × 111.125 mm) bore and stroke could produce 420 hp (310 kW) at 6,600 rpm (1.77 hp per cubic inch, 81 kW/L) making it remarkably power-dense. Other variants of the engine produced even higher outputs of 3 hp per cubic inch (137 kW/L), unparalleled for their size and capacity in power-to cubic-inch/cylinder-count ratio. Another reason for the engine's success was its reliability. Its monobloc construction made it immune to head gasket or cylinder stud problems, and allowed for higher cylinder pressures.

From 1934 through the 1970s, the Offenhauser engine dominated American open-wheel racing, winning the Indianapolis 500 27 times. From 1950 through 1960, Offenhauser-powered cars won the Indianapolis 500 and achieved all three podium positions, winning the pole position in 10 of the 11 years.

The Offenhauser shop began to do machine work for Lockheed in 1940, as the arms build-up for anticipated war began. The last prewar engine was shipped on July 17, 1941, and the plant began producing hydraulic systems after the Pearl Harbor attack. Leo Goossen finally became a full-time Offenhauser employee in 1944, and Fred Offenhauser sold the company in 1946.

In 1959 Lime Rock Park held a famous Formula Libre race, where Rodger Ward shocked the expensive and exotic sports car contingent by beating them on the road course in an Offenhauser powered midget car, which was normally considered competitive on oval tracks only. On the strength of this performance, the car was entered in the Formula 1 1959 US Grand Prix at Sebring, where it was totally uncompetitive, setting a qualifying time of 3:43.8 compared to the pole time of 3 minutes dead and being the slowest Formula 1 starter at 3:33.4.

When Ford came onto the scene in 1963, with much increased competition and sanctioning body rule changes, the Offy began to lose its domination over Indy car racing, although it remained a competitive winner on the circuit including at the 500 through the mid-1970s even with the advent of turbocharging. A more powerful turbocharged version of the engine was used by Offenhauser in 1968, and gave Bobby Unser the win that year. The engine made 750 hp (560 kW) @ 9,500 rpm, from a displacement of only 168 cu in (2,750 cc). Outputs over 1,000 bhp (750 kW) could be attained, using around 44.3 psi (3.05 bar) of boost pressure. The final 2.65-litre four-cylinder Offy, restricted to 24.6 psi (1.70 bar) boost, produced 770 bhp (570 kW) at 9,000 rpm. The Offy's final victory came at Trenton in 1978, in Gordon Johncock's Wildcat. The last time an Offy-powered car raced was at Pocono in 1982 for the Domino's Pizza Pocono 500, in an Eagle chassis driven by Jim McElreath, although two Vollstedt chassis with Offenhauser engines failed to qualify for the 1983 Indianapolis 500.

== Common Offenhauser engines ==
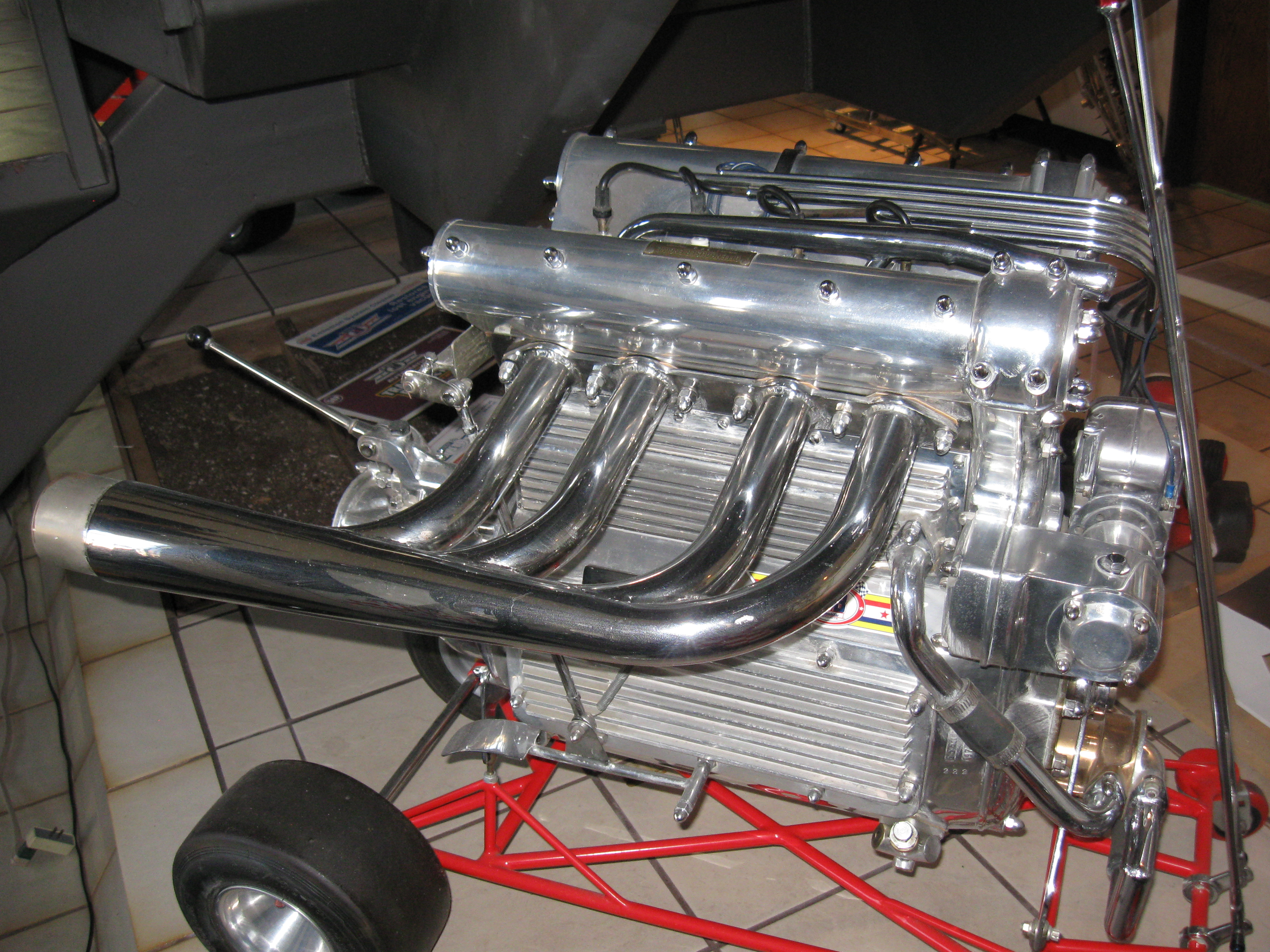
An Offenhauser midget engine, polished for display

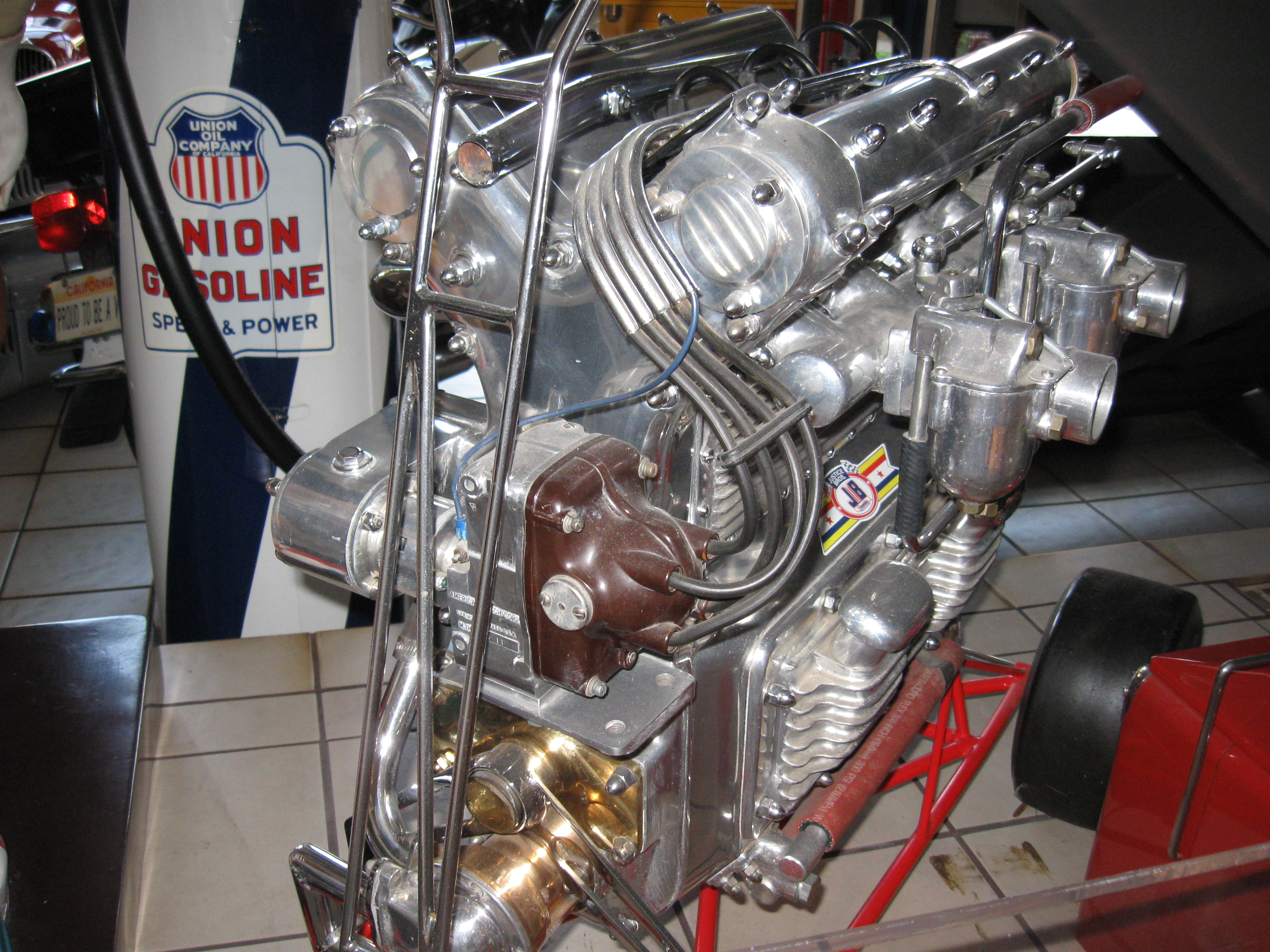
Offenhauser midget car engine - front view

Offenhauser produced engine blocks in several sizes. These blocks could be bored out or sleeved to vary the cylinder bore, and could be used with crankshafts of various strokes, resulting in a wide variety of engine displacements. Offenhauser (and Meyer-Drake, in later years) frequently made blocks, pistons, rods, and crankshafts to specific customer requests. However, certain engine sizes were common, and could be considered the "standard" Offenhauser engines:

- 97 cu in (1.59 L) - to meet the displacement rule in many midget series
- 220 cu in (3.6 L) - displacement rule in AAA (later USAC) sprint cars
- 270 cu in (4.4 L) - displacement rule for the Indianapolis 500 under AAA rules
- 255 cu in (4.18 L) - for Indianapolis (during the 1930s fuel consumption rules)
- 252 cu in (4.13 L) - displacement rule for Indianapolis under USAC rules
- 168 cu in (2.75 L) - displacement rule for turbocharged engines at Indianapolis (to 1968)
- 159 cu in (2.61 L) - displacement rule for turbocharged engines at Indianapolis (1969 and later)

== World Championship Indianapolis 500 summary ==
From 1950 to 1960, the Indianapolis 500 was a round of the World Drivers' Championship.

Season	Cars entered	Winning driver	Second driver	Third driver	Pole sitter	Race report
1950	31	Johnnie Parsons	Bill Holland	Mauri Rose	Walt Faulkner	Report
1951	32	Lee Wallard	Mike Nazaruk	Manny Ayulo		Report
1952	30	Troy Ruttman	Jim Rathmann	Sam Hanks	Fred Agabashian	Report
1953	32	Bill Vukovich	Art Cross	Sam Hanks	Bill Vukovich	Report
1954	34	Bill Vukovich	Jimmy Bryan	Jack McGrath	Jack McGrath	Report
1955	35	Bob Sweikert	Tony Bettenhausen	Jimmy Davies	Jerry Hoyt	Report
1956	32	Pat Flaherty	Sam Hanks	Don Freeland	Pat Flaherty	Report
1957	31	Sam Hanks	Jim Rathmann	Jimmy Bryan	Pat O'Connor	Report
1958	31	Jimmy Bryan	George Amick	Johnny Boyd	Dick Rathmann	Report
1959	33	Rodger Ward	Jim Rathmann	Johnny Thomson	Johnny Thomson	Report
1960	33	Jim Rathmann	Rodger Ward	Paul Goldsmith	Eddie Sachs	Report

See Indianapolis Motor Speedway race results for a more complete list.

In the 11 World Championship years, the Meyer-Drake Offenhauser engine partnered for at least one race with the following 35 constructors:

- Adams
- Bromme
- Christensen
- Emil Diedt
- Frank DelRoy
- Dunn
- Eagle
- Elder
- Quin Epperly
- Wayne Ewing
- Hall
- Kurtis Kraft
- Eddie Kuzma
- Langley
- Lesovsky
- Carl Marchese
- Maserati
- McLaren
- Meskowski
- Lou Moore
- Nichels
- Olson
- Pankratz
- Pawl
- Phillips
- Johnny Rae
- George Salih
- Schroeder
- Sherman
- Russ Snowberger
- Stevens
- Sutton
- Trevis
- Turner
- A. J. Watson
- Wetteroth

== Complete Formula One World Championship results ==
(excluding the 1950-1960 Indianapolis 500) (key)

Year	Entrant	Chassis	Engine	Tyres	Drivers	1	2	3	4	5	6	7	8	9	10	Points	WCC
1959	Leader Cards Inc.	Kurtis Kraft Midget	L4	?		MON	500	NED	FRA	GBR	GER	POR	ITA	USA		0	-
1959	Leader Cards Inc.	Kurtis Kraft Midget	L4	?	Rodger Ward									Ret		0	-
1960	Reventlow Automobiles Inc	Scarab F1	L4	D		ARG	MON	500	NED	BEL	FRA	GBR	POR	ITA	USA	0	-
1960	Reventlow Automobiles Inc	Scarab F1	L4	D	Chuck Daigh	DNA	DNQ		DNS	Ret	DNS				10	0	-
1960	Reventlow Automobiles Inc	Scarab F1	L4	D	Lance Reventlow		DNQ		DNS	Ret						0	-
1960	Reventlow Automobiles Inc	Scarab F1	L4	D	Richie Ginther						DNS					0	-
