= Langley (constructor) =

American racecar constructor

Langley was an American racing car constructor. A Langley car competed in one FIA World Championship race - the 1950 Indianapolis 500.

== World Championship Indianapolis 500 results ==
Season	Driver	Grid	Classification	Points	Note	Race Report
1950	Gene Hartley	31	16			Report
