= Olson (constructor) =

Olson was a racing car constructor. Olson cars competed in one round of the FIA World Championship - the 1950 Indianapolis 500.

== Complete World Championship results ==
Season	Driver	Grid	Classification	Points	Note	Race Report
1950	Jackie Holmes	30	23		Spun Off	Report
