= Adams (constructor) =

Adams was an American racing car constructor named after Clyde Adams. Adams had left his native Texas and moved to Los Angeles at the age of 20. Adams started working for Harry Miller, and built a reputation as a first-class metalworker. When Miller's business collapsed in the aftermath of the Great Depression, Adams set up his own business. He worked on a range of Indianapolis 500 vehicles from 1930 to 1950, as well as several speedcars.

Adams cars competed in one FIA World Championship race - the 1950 Indianapolis 500.

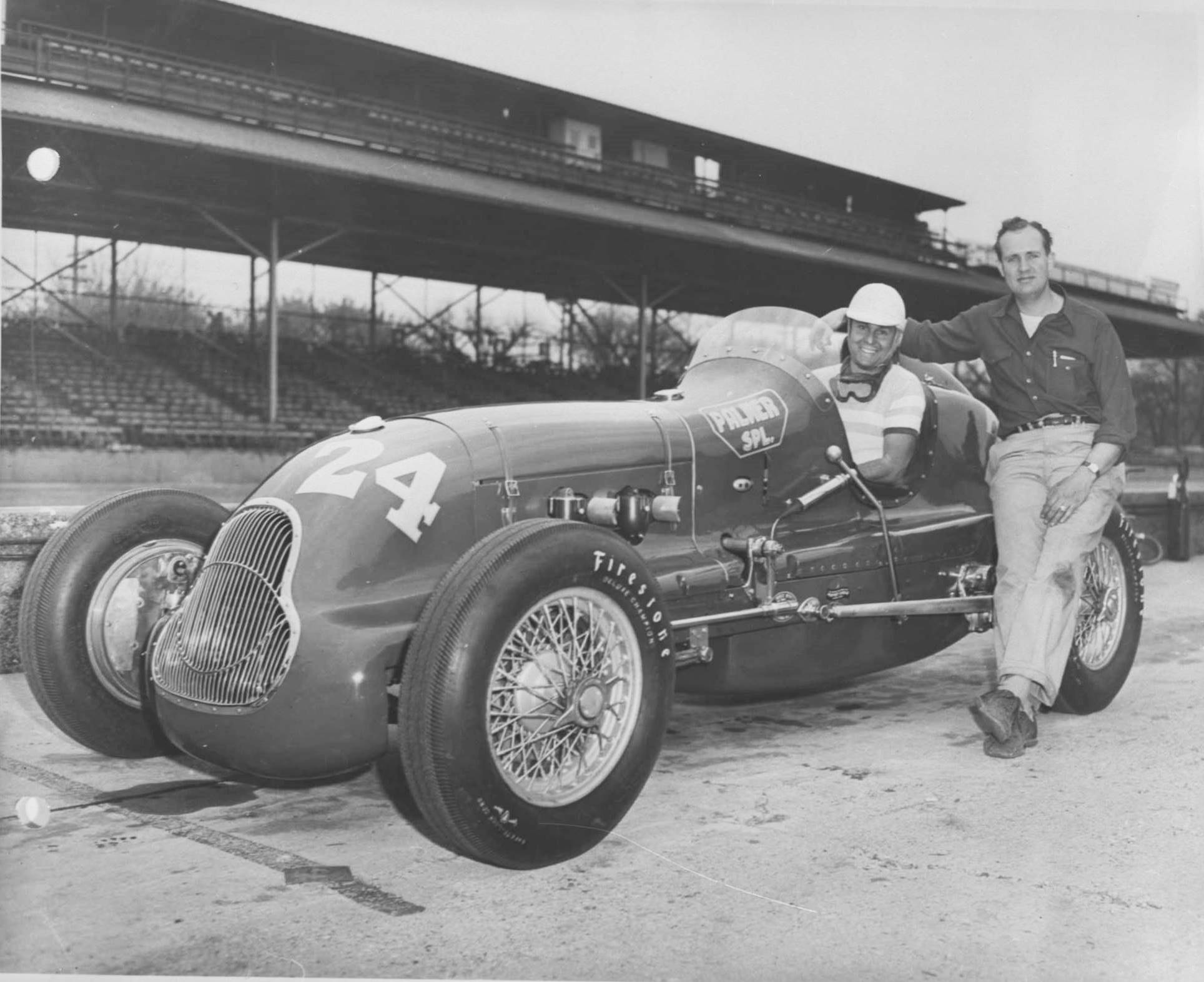
Adams Offenhauser, 1950 Indianapolis 500

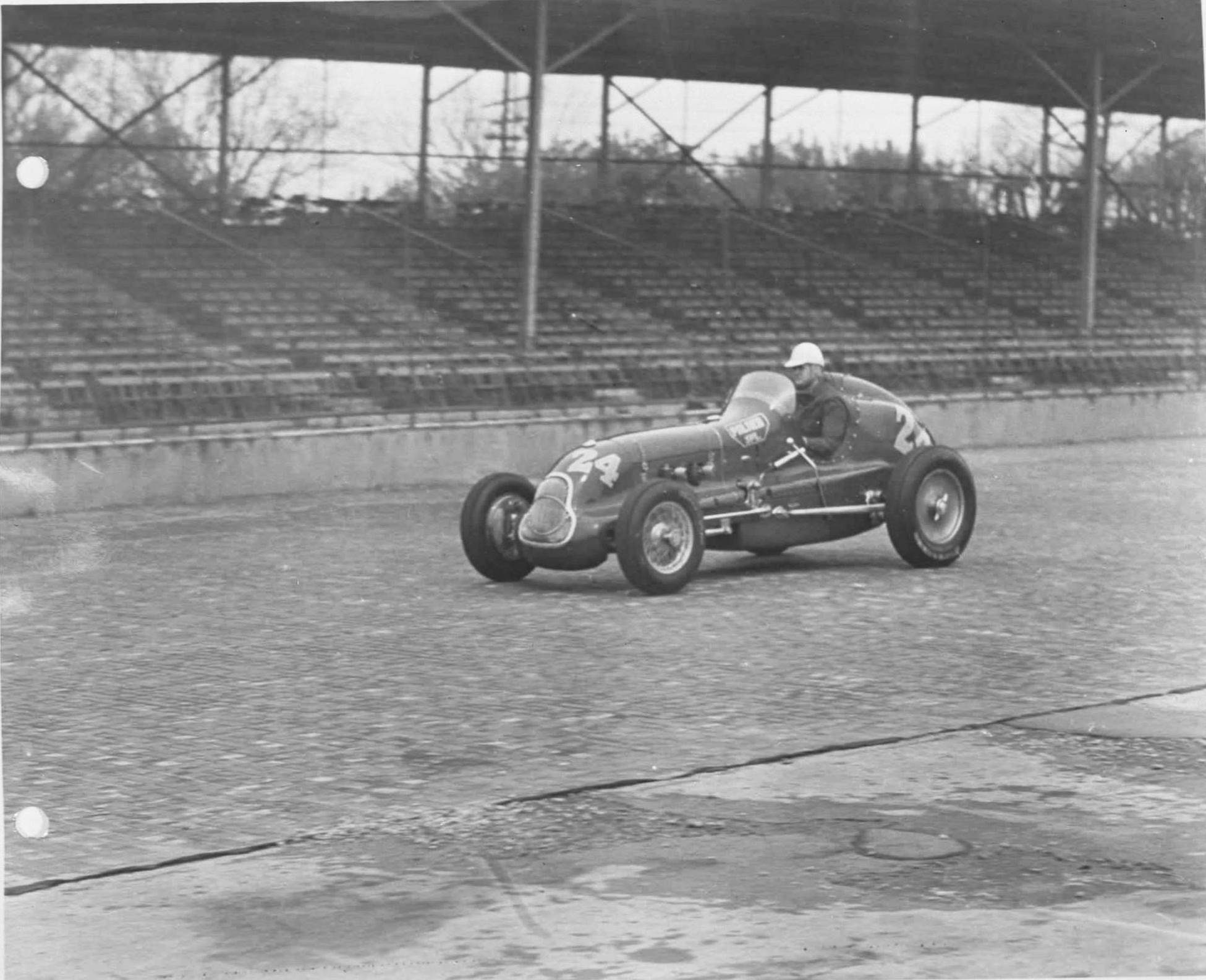
Bayliss Levrett in Adams Offenhauser Palmer Special, 1950 Indianapolis 500

== World Championship Indianapolis 500 results ==
| Season | Driver | Grid | Classification | Points | Note | Race Report |
|---|---|---|---|---|---|---|
| 1950 | Bayliss Levrett; Bill Cantrell | 17 | 27 | | Oil pressure | Report |
