= List of Indianapolis 500 winners =

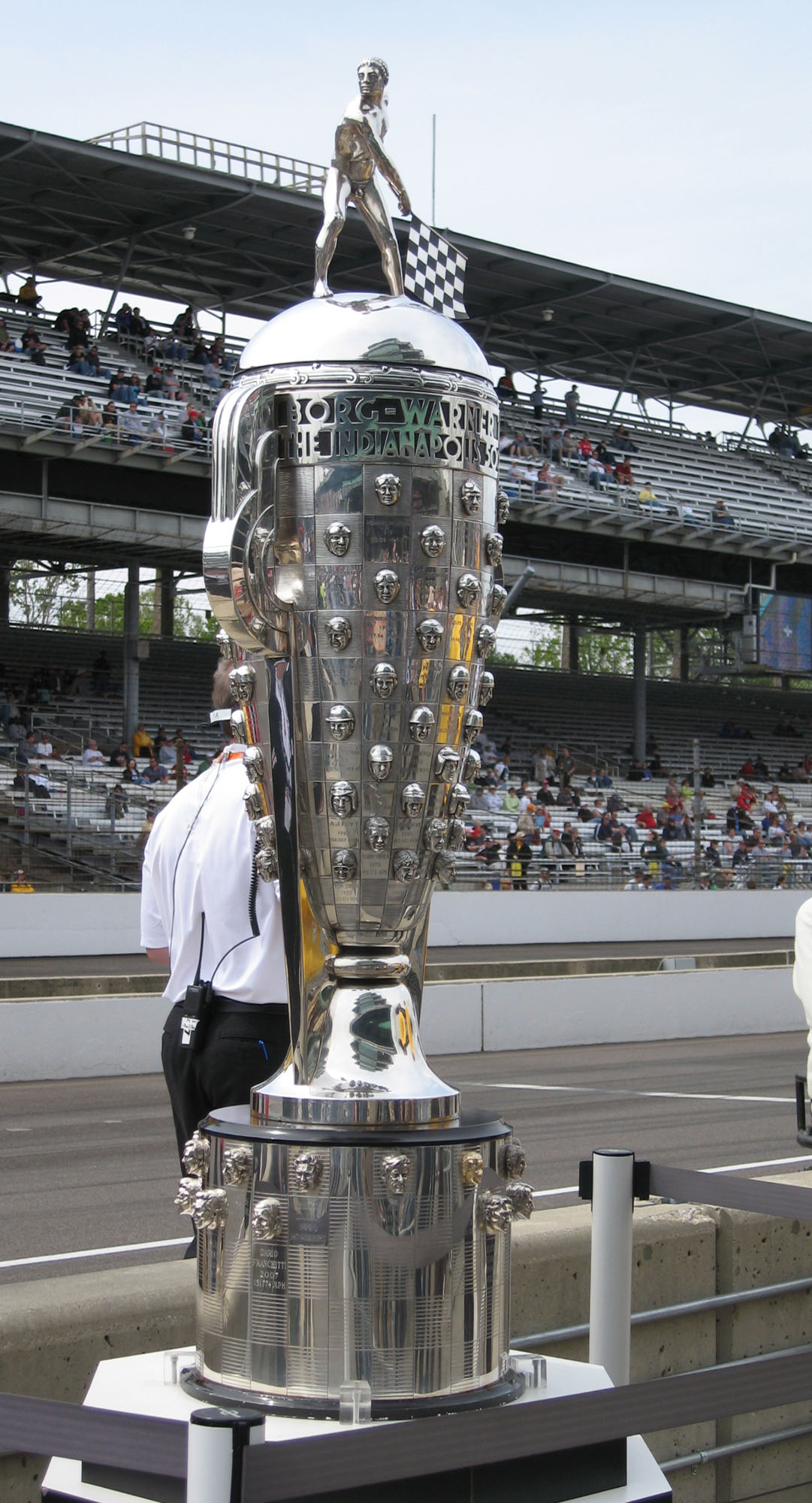
The winner of the Indianapolis 500 is awarded a small replica of the Borg-Warner Trophy.

The Indianapolis 500 (also called the Indianapolis 500-Mile Race) (Note: It was called the International 500-Mile Sweepstakes Race in 1911, the Liberty Sweepstakes in 1919, and the International 500-Mile Sweepstakes Race again from 1920 to 1980.) is an annual American open-wheel car race held on American Memorial Day weekend at the Indianapolis Motor Speedway (IMS), in Speedway, Indiana. It was first held in 1911 after the track's owners had experimented with several other long-distance auto races over the previous two years. The race was not held in 1917 or 1918 and again from 1942 to 1945 because of war. It was administered by the American Automobile Association between 1911 and 1955, then by the United States Auto Club from 1956 to 1997, and finally by the Indy Racing League/IndyCar beginning in 1998. The event usually covers 200 laps over a total distance of 500 mi (800 km). Each winning racer and team is presented with a small replica of the Art Deco sterling silver Borg-Warner Trophy, (Note: Since 1987, the original trophy has had a sterling silver egg-shaped bas-relief sculpture of the winning driver's face affixed to the base.) a replica of the pace car, a large sum of money, and a championship ring as prizes for winning the race. In the 110 editions of the Indianapolis 500 that have occurred as of the 2026 event, 77 different drivers have won.

A. J. Foyt, Al Unser, Rick Mears, and Hélio Castroneves share the record for the most victories with four each. Troy Ruttman and Unser are the youngest and oldest Indianapolis 500 winners, winning at the ages of 22 years and 80 days in 1952 and 47 years and 360 days in 1987, respectively. Juan Pablo Montoya holds the record for the longest period of time between two victories – 15 years between the 2000 and 2015 races. Castroneves holds the record for the longest span of wins. He won his first Indianapolis 500 in 2001 and his most recent (as of 2026) in 2021, a span of 20 years. It has been won by drivers from 12 different countries. A total of 55 American drivers have won 78 editions of the race, more than any other nationality. The winner of the first race was American racer Ray Harroun in 1911, and the most recent winner is Swedish racer Felix Rosenqvist in 2026. Two editions of the Indianapolis 500, in 1924 and 1941, were won by two drivers sharing a car; relief drivers were used in the winning entries in 1911, 1912, 1923, and 1925, but they are not recognized as race winners. Team Penske has won the most races as a car entrant with 20 since their first in 1972. (Note: Victories for Team Penske are also listed under three other entrants: Roger Penske Enterprises, Penske Cars, and Penske Racing.)

== By year ==
Key
(R)	Indicates winning driver was an Indianapolis 500 rookie
*	Indicates race was ended early by rain
†	Indicates driver was national open-wheel champion that year

Tire manufacturers
Key
Icon	Maker
BF	BFGoodrich
F	Firestone
G	Goodyear
M	Michelin
P	Palmer Cord

Winners of the Indianapolis 500 by year
Year	Date	Driver	No.	Team	Make/Model	Tire	Distance				Speed		Ref
Year	Date	Driver	No.	Team	Make/Model	Tire	Laps	mi	km	Time	mph	km/h	Ref
1911	May 30	Ray Harroun (USA) (R) (Note: Relief drivers for Harroun (1911), Dawson (1912), Milton (1923), and DePaolo (1925) included Cyrus Patschke, Don Herr, Howdy Wilcox, and Norman Batten, respectively. None of the four relief drivers have been officially recognized as race winners.)	32	Nordyke & Marmon Company	Marmon Wasp	F	200	500	800	6:42:08.000	74.602	120.060	
1912	May 30	Joe Dawson (USA)	8	National Motor Vehicle Company	National	M	200	500	800	6:21:06.000	78.719	126.686	
1913	May 30	Jules Goux (FRA) (R)	16	Peugeot	Peugeot L76	F	200	500	800	6:35:05.000	75.933	122.202	
1914	May 30	René Thomas (FRA) (R)	16	Louis Delâge Company	Delage	P	200	500	800	6:03:45.990	82.474	132.729	
1915	May 31	Ralph DePalma (USA)	2	E. C. Patterson	Mercedes	BF	200	500	800	5:33:55.510	89.840	144.583	
1916	May 30	Dario Resta (GBR)†	17	Peugeot Auto Racing	Peugeot	BF	120	300	480	3:34:17.000	84.001	135.187	
1917–1918	Not held as a result of World War I												
1919	May 31	Howdy Wilcox (USA)	3	Indianapolis Speedway Team	Peugeot	G	200	500	800	5:40:32.870	88.050	141.703	
1920	May 31	Gaston Chevrolet (USA)†	4	William Small Company	Frontenac	F	200	500	800	5:38:32.000	88.618	142.617	
1921	May 30	Tommy Milton (USA)†	2	Louis Chevrolet	Frontenac	F	200	500	800	5:34:44.650	89.621	144.231	
1922	May 30	Jimmy Murphy (USA)†	35	Jimmy Murphy	Duesenberg-Miller	F	200	500	800	5:17:30.790	94.484	152.057	
1923	May 30	Tommy Milton (USA)	1	H. C. S. Motor Company	Miller	F	200	500	800	5:29:50.170	90.954	146.376	
1924	May 30	Lora L. Corum (USA)	15	Duesenberg	Duesenberg	F	200	500	800	5:05:23.210	98.234	158.092	
1924	May 30	Joe Boyer (USA)	15	Duesenberg	Duesenberg	F	200	500	800	5:05:23.210	98.234	158.092	
1925	May 30	Pete DePaolo (USA)†	12	Duesenberg	Duesenberg	F	200	500	800	4:56:39.470	101.127	162.748	
1926*	May 31	Frank Lockhart (USA) (R)	15	Pete Kreis	Miller	F	160	400	640	4:10:14.950	95.904	154.343	
1927	May 30	George Souders (USA) (R)	32	William S. White	Duesenberg	F	200	500	800	5:07:33.080	97.545	156.983	
1928	May 30	Louis Meyer (USA)†	14	Alden Sampson II	Miller	F	200	500	800	5:01:33.750	99.482	160.101	
1929	May 30	Ray Keech (USA)	2	M. A. Yagle	Miller	F	200	500	800	5:07:25.420	97.585	157.048	
1930	May 30	Billy Arnold (USA)†	4	Harry Hartz	Summers-Miller	F	200	500	800	4:58:39.720	100.448	161.655	
1931	May 30	Louis Schneider (USA)†	23	B. L. Schneider	Stevens-Miller	F	200	500	800	5:10:27.930	96.629	155.509	
1932	May 30	Fred Frame (USA)	34	Harry Hartz	Wetteroth-Miller	F	200	500	800	4:48:03.790	104.144	167.604	
1933	May 30	Louis Meyer (USA)†	36	Louis Meyer	Miller	F	200	500	800	4:48:00.750	104.162	167.632	
1934	May 30	Bill Cummings (USA)†	7	H. C. Henning	Miller	F	200	500	800	4:46:05.200	104.863	168.761	
1935	May 30	Kelly Petillo (USA)†	5	Kelly Petillo	Wetteroth-Offenhauser	F	200	500	800	4:42:22.710	106.240	170.977	
1936	May 30	Louis Meyer (USA)	8	Louis Meyer	Stevens-Miller	F	200	500	800	4:35:03.390	109.069	175.530	
1937	May 31	Wilbur Shaw (USA)†	6	Wilbur Shaw	Shaw-Offenhauser	F	200	500	800	4:24:07.800	113.580	182.789	
1938	May 30	Floyd Roberts (USA)†	23	Lou Moore	Wetteroth-Miller	F	200	500	800	4:14:58.400	117.200	188.615	
1939	May 30	Wilbur Shaw (USA)†	2	Boyle Racing Headquarters	Maserati 8CTF	F	200	500	800	4:20:47.490	115.035	185.131	
1940	May 30	Wilbur Shaw (USA)	1	Boyle Racing Headquarters	Maserati 8CTF	F	200	500	800	4:22:31.170	114.277	183.911	
1941	May 30	Floyd Davis (USA)	16	Lou Moore	Wetteroth-Offenhauser	F	200	500	800	4:20:36.240	115.117	185.263	
1941	May 30	Mauri Rose (USA)	16	Lou Moore	Wetteroth-Offenhauser	F	200	500	800	4:20:36.240	115.117	185.263	
1942–1945	Not held as a result of World War II												
1946	May 30	George Robson (USA)	16	Thorne Engineering	Adams-Sparks	F	200	500	800	4:21:16.700	114.820	184.785	
1947	May 30	Mauri Rose (USA)	27	Lou Moore	Diedt-Offenhauser	F	200	500	800	4:17:52.170	116.338	187.228	
1948	May 31	Mauri Rose (USA)	3	Lou Moore	Diedt-Offenhauser	F	200	500	800	4:10:23.330	119.814	192.822	
1949	May 30	Bill Holland (USA)	7	Lou Moore	Diedt-Offenhauser	F	200	500	800	4:07:15.970	121.327	195.257	
1950*	May 30	Johnnie Parsons (USA)	1	Kurtis Kraft	Kurtis-Offenhauser	F	138	345	555	2:46:55.970	124.002	199.561	
1951	May 30	Lee Wallard (USA)	99	Murrell Belanger	Kurtis-Offenhauser	F	200	500	800	3:57:38.050	126.244	203.170	
1952	May 30	Troy Ruttman (USA)	98	J. C. Agajanian	Kuzma-Offenhauser	F	200	500	800	3:52:41.880	128.922	207.479	
1953	May 30	Bill Vukovich (USA)	14	Howard B. Keck	Kurtis KK500A-Offenhauser	F	200	500	800	3:53:01.690	128.740	207.186	
1954	May 31	Bill Vukovich (USA)	14	Howard B. Keck	Kurtis KK500A-Offenhauser	F	200	500	800	3:49:17.270	130.840	210.566	
1955	May 30	Bob Sweikert (USA)†	6	John Zink	Kurtis KK500D-Offenhauser	F	200	500	800	3:53:59.530	128.209	206.332	
1956	May 30	Pat Flaherty (USA)	8	John Zink	Watson-Offenhauser	F	200	500	800	3:53:28.840	128.490	206.784	
1957	May 30	Sam Hanks (USA)	9	George Salih	Salih-Offenhauser	F	200	500	800	3:41:14.250	135.601	218.228	
1958	May 30	Jimmy Bryan (USA)	1	George Salih	Salih-Offenhauser	F	200	500	800	3:44:13.800	133.791	215.315	
1959	May 30	Rodger Ward (USA)†	5	Leader Cards	Watson-Offenhauser	F	200	500	800	3:40:49.200	135.857	218.640	
1960	May 30	Jim Rathmann (USA)	4	Ken-Paul	Watson-Offenhauser	F	200	500	800	3:36:11.360	138.767	223.323	
1961	May 30	A. J. Foyt (USA)†	1	Bignotti-Bowes Racing	Trevis-Offenhauser	F	200	500	800	3:35:37.490	139.130	223.908	
1962	May 30	Rodger Ward (USA)†	3	Leader Cards	Watson-Offenhauser	F	200	500	800	3:33:50.330	140.293	225.780	
1963	May 30	Parnelli Jones (USA)	98	J. C. Agajanian	Watson-Offenhauser	F	200	500	800	3:29:35.400	143.137	230.357	
1964	May 30	A. J. Foyt (USA)†	1	Ansted-Thompson Racing	Watson-Offenhauser	F	200	500	800	3:23:35.830	147.350	237.137	
1965	May 31	Jim Clark (GBR)	82	Team Lotus	Lotus 38-Ford	F	200	500	800	3:19:05.340	150.686	242.506	
1966	May 30	Graham Hill (GBR) (R)	24	Mecom Racing Team	Lola T90-Ford	F	200	500	800	3:27:52.530	144.317	232.256	
1967	May 30–31	A. J. Foyt (USA)†	14	Ansted-Thompson Racing	Coyote-Ford	G	200	500	800	3:18:24.220	151.207	243.000	
1968	May 30	Bobby Unser (USA)†	3	Leader Cards	Eagle 68-Offenhauser	G	200	500	800	3:16:13.760	152.882	246.040	
1969	May 30	Mario Andretti (USA)†	2	STP Corporation	Brawner Hawk Mk III-Ford	F	200	500	800	3:11:14.710	156.867	252.453	
1970	May 30	Al Unser (USA)†	2	Vel's Parnelli Jones Racing	Colt 70-Ford	F	200	500	800	3:12:37.040	155.749	250.654	
1971	May 29	Al Unser (USA)	1	Vel's Parnelli Jones Racing	Colt 71-Ford	F	200	500	800	3:10:11.560	157.735	253.850	
1972	May 27	Mark Donohue (USA)	66	Roger Penske Enterprises	McLaren M16B-Offenhauser	G	200	500	800	3:04:05.540	162.962	262.262	
1973*	May 28–30	Gordon Johncock (USA)	20	Patrick Racing Team	Eagle 73-Offenhauser	G	133	333	536	2:05:26.590	159.036	255.944	
1974	May 26	Johnny Rutherford (USA)	3	Bruce McLaren Motor Racing	McLaren M16C/D-Offenhauser	G	200	500	800	3:09:10.060	158.589	255.224	
1975*	May 25	Bobby Unser (USA)	48	All American Racers	Eagle 75-Offenhauser	G	174	435	700	2:54:55.080	149.213	240.135	
1976*	May 30	Johnny Rutherford (USA)	2	Bruce McLaren Motor Racing	McLaren M16E-Offenhauser	G	102	255	410	1:42:52.480	148.725	239.350	
1977	May 29	A. J. Foyt (USA)	14	A. J. Foyt Enterprises	Coyote-Foyt	G	200	500	800	3:05:57.160	161.331	259.637	
1978	May 28	Al Unser (USA)	2	Chaparral Racing	Lola T500-Cosworth	G	200	500	800	3:05:54.990	161.363	259.689	
1979	May 27	Rick Mears (USA)†	9	Penske Racing	Penske PC6-Cosworth	G	200	500	800	3:08:47.970	158.899	255.723	
1980	May 25	Johnny Rutherford (USA)†	4	Chaparral Racing	Chaparral 2K-Cosworth	G	200	500	800	3:29:59.560	142.862	229.914	
1981	May 24	Bobby Unser (USA)	3	Penske Racing	Penske PC9B-Cosworth	G	200	500	800	3:35:41.780	139.084	223.834	
1982	May 30	Gordon Johncock (USA)	20	Patrick Racing Team	Wildcat Mk8B-Cosworth	G	200	500	800	3:05:09.140	162.029	260.760	
1983	May 29	Tom Sneva (USA)	5	Bignotti-Cotter	March 83C-Cosworth	G	200	500	800	3:05:03.066	162.117	260.902	
1984	May 27	Rick Mears (USA)	6	Penske Cars	March 84C-Cosworth	G	200	500	800	3:03:21.660	163.612	263.308	
1985	May 26	Danny Sullivan (USA)	5	Penske Cars	March 85C-Cosworth	G	200	500	800	3:16:06.069	152.982	246.201	
1986	May 31	Bobby Rahal (USA)†	3	Truesports	March 86C-Cosworth	G	200	500	800	2:55:43.480	170.722	274.750	
1987	May 24	Al Unser (USA)	25	Penske Racing	March 86C-Cosworth	G	200	500	800	3:04:59.147	162.175	260.995	
1988	May 29	Rick Mears (USA)	5	Penske Racing	Penske PC-17-Chevrolet	G	200	500	800	3:27:10.204	144.809	233.047	
1989	May 28	Emerson Fittipaldi (BRA)†	20	Patrick Racing	Penske PC-18-Chevrolet	G	200	500	800	2:59:01.040	167.581	269.695	
1990	May 27	Arie Luyendyk (NLD)	30	Doug Shierson Racing	Lola T90/00-Chevrolet	G	200	500	800	2:41:18.404	185.981	299.307	
1991	May 26	Rick Mears (USA)	3	Penske Racing	Penske PC-20-Chevrolet	G	200	500	800	2:50:00.791	176.457	283.980	
1992	May 24	Al Unser Jr. (USA)	3	Galles-Kraco Racing	Galmer G92-Chevrolet	G	200	500	800	3:43:05.148	134.477	216.420	
1993	May 30	Emerson Fittipaldi (BRA)	4	Penske Racing	Penske PC-22-Chevrolet	G	200	500	800	3:10:49.860	157.207	253.000	
1994	May 29	Al Unser Jr. (USA)†	31	Penske Racing	Penske PC-23-Mercedes-Benz	G	200	500	800	3:06:29.006	160.872	258.898	
1995	May 28	Jacques Villeneuve (CAN)†	27	Team Green	Reynard 95I-Ford	G	200	500	800	3:15:17.561	153.616	247.221	
1996	May 26	Buddy Lazier (USA)	91	Hemelgarn Racing	Reynard 95I-Ford	F	200	500	800	3:22:45.753	147.956	238.112	
1997	May 26–27	Arie Luyendyk (NLD)	5	Treadway Racing	G-Force GF01-Oldsmobile Aurora	F	200	500	800	3:25:43.388	145.827	234.685	
1998	May 24	Eddie Cheever (USA)	51	Team Cheever	Dallara IR7-Oldsmobile Aurora	G	200	500	800	3:26:40.524	145.155	233.604	
1999	May 30	Kenny Bräck (SWE)	14	A. J. Foyt Enterprises	Dallara IR7-Oldsmobile Aurora	G	200	500	800	3:15:51.182	153.176	246.513	
2000	May 28	Juan Pablo Montoya (COL) (R)	9	Chip Ganassi Racing	G-Force GF05-Oldsmobile Aurora	F	200	500	800	2:58:59.431	167.607	269.737	
2001	May 27	Hélio Castroneves (BRA) (R)	68	Team Penske	Dallara IR-01-Oldsmobile Aurora	F	200	500	800	3:31:54.180	141.574	227.841	
2002	May 26	Hélio Castroneves (BRA)	3	Team Penske	Dallara IR-02-Chevrolet	F	200	500	800	3:00:10.8714	166.499	267.954	
2003	May 25	Gil de Ferran (BRA)	6	Team Penske	Panoz G-Force GF09-Toyota	F	200	500	800	3:11:56.9891	156.291	251.526	
2004*	May 30	Buddy Rice (USA)	15	Rahal Letterman Racing	Panoz G-Force GF09-Honda	F	180	450	720	3:14:55.2395	138.518	222.923	
2005	May 29	Dan Wheldon (GBR)†	26	Andretti Green Racing	Dallara IR-03-Honda	F	200	500	800	3:10:21.0769	157.603	253.637	
2006	May 28	Sam Hornish Jr. (USA)†	6	Team Penske	Dallara IR-03-Honda	F	200	500	800	3:10:58.7590	157.085	252.804	
2007*	May 27	Dario Franchitti (GBR)†	27	Andretti Green Racing	Dallara IR-05-Honda	F	166	415	668	2:44:03.5608	151.774	244.257	
2008	May 25	Scott Dixon (NZL)†	9	Chip Ganassi Racing	Dallara IR-05-Honda	F	200	500	800	3:28:57.6792	143.567	231.049	
2009	May 24	Hélio Castroneves (BRA)	3	Team Penske	Dallara IR-05-Honda	F	200	500	800	3:19:34.6427	150.318	241.913	
2010	May 30	Dario Franchitti (GBR)†	10	Chip Ganassi Racing	Dallara IR-05-Honda	F	200	500	800	3:05:37.0131	161.623	260.107	
2011	May 29	Dan Wheldon (GBR)	98	Bryan Herta Autosport	Dallara IR-05-Honda	F	200	500	800	2:56:11.7267	170.265	274.015	
2012	May 27	Dario Franchitti (GBR)	50	Chip Ganassi Racing	Dallara DW12-Honda	F	200	500	800	2:58:51.2532	167.734	269.942	
2013	May 26	Tony Kanaan (BRA)	11	KV Racing Technology	Dallara DW12-Chevrolet	F	200	500	800	2:40:03.4181	187.433	301.644	
2014	May 25	Ryan Hunter-Reay (USA)	28	Andretti Autosport	Dallara DW12-Honda	F	200	500	800	2:40:48.2305	186.563	300.244	
2015	May 24	Juan Pablo Montoya (COL)	2	Team Penske	Dallara DW12-Chevrolet	F	200	500	800	3:05:56.5286	161.341	259.653	
2016	May 29	Alexander Rossi (USA) (R)	98	Andretti Herta Autosport w/ Curb-Agajanian	Dallara DW12-Honda	F	200	500	800	3:00:02.0872	166.634	268.171	
2017	May 28	Takuma Sato (JPN)	26	Andretti Autosport	Dallara DW12-Honda	F	200	500	800	3:13:03.3584	155.395	250.084	
2018	May 27	Will Power (AUS)	12	Team Penske	Dallara DW12-Chevrolet	F	200	500	800	2:59:42.6365	166.935	268.656	
2019	May 26	Simon Pagenaud (FRA)	22	Team Penske	Dallara DW12-Chevrolet	F	200	500	800	2:50:39.2797	175.794	282.913	
2020	August 23 (Note: Because of the COVID-19 pandemic in Indiana, the 2020 race was moved from May 24 to August 23.)	Takuma Sato (JPN)	30	Rahal Letterman Lanigan Racing	Dallara DW12-Honda	F	200	500	800	3:10:05.0880	157.824	253.993	
2021	May 30	Hélio Castroneves (BRA)	06	Meyer Shank Racing	Dallara DW12-Honda	F	200	500	800	2:37:19.3846	190.690	306.886	
2022	May 29	Marcus Ericsson (SWE)	8	Chip Ganassi Racing	Dallara DW12-Honda	F	200	500	800	2:51:00.6432	175.428	282.324	
2023	May 28	Josef Newgarden (USA)	2	Team Penske	Dallara DW12-Chevrolet	F	200	500	800	2:58:21.9611	168.193	270.680	
2024	May 26	Josef Newgarden (USA)	2	Team Penske	Dallara DW12-Chevrolet	F	200	500	800	2:58:49.4079	167.763	269.988	
2025	May 25	Álex Palou (ESP)†	10	Chip Ganassi Racing	Dallara DW12-Honda	F	200	500	800	2:57:38.2965	168.883	271.790	
2026	May 24	Felix Rosenqvist (SWE)	60	Meyer Shank Racing	Dallara DW12-Honda	F	200	500	800	3:05:09.6471	162.021	260.747	

== By driver ==
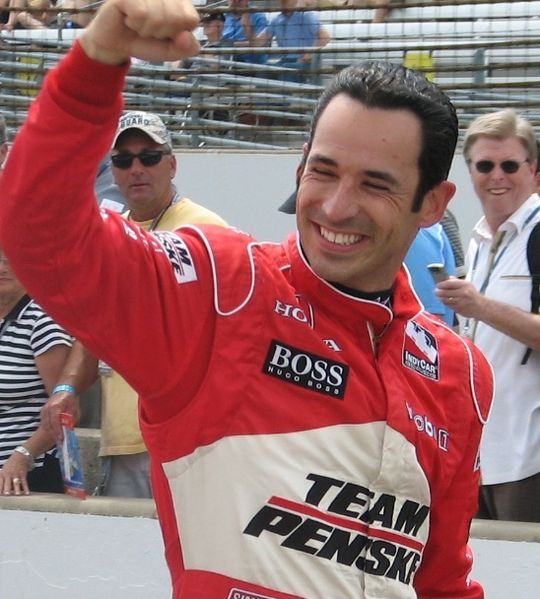
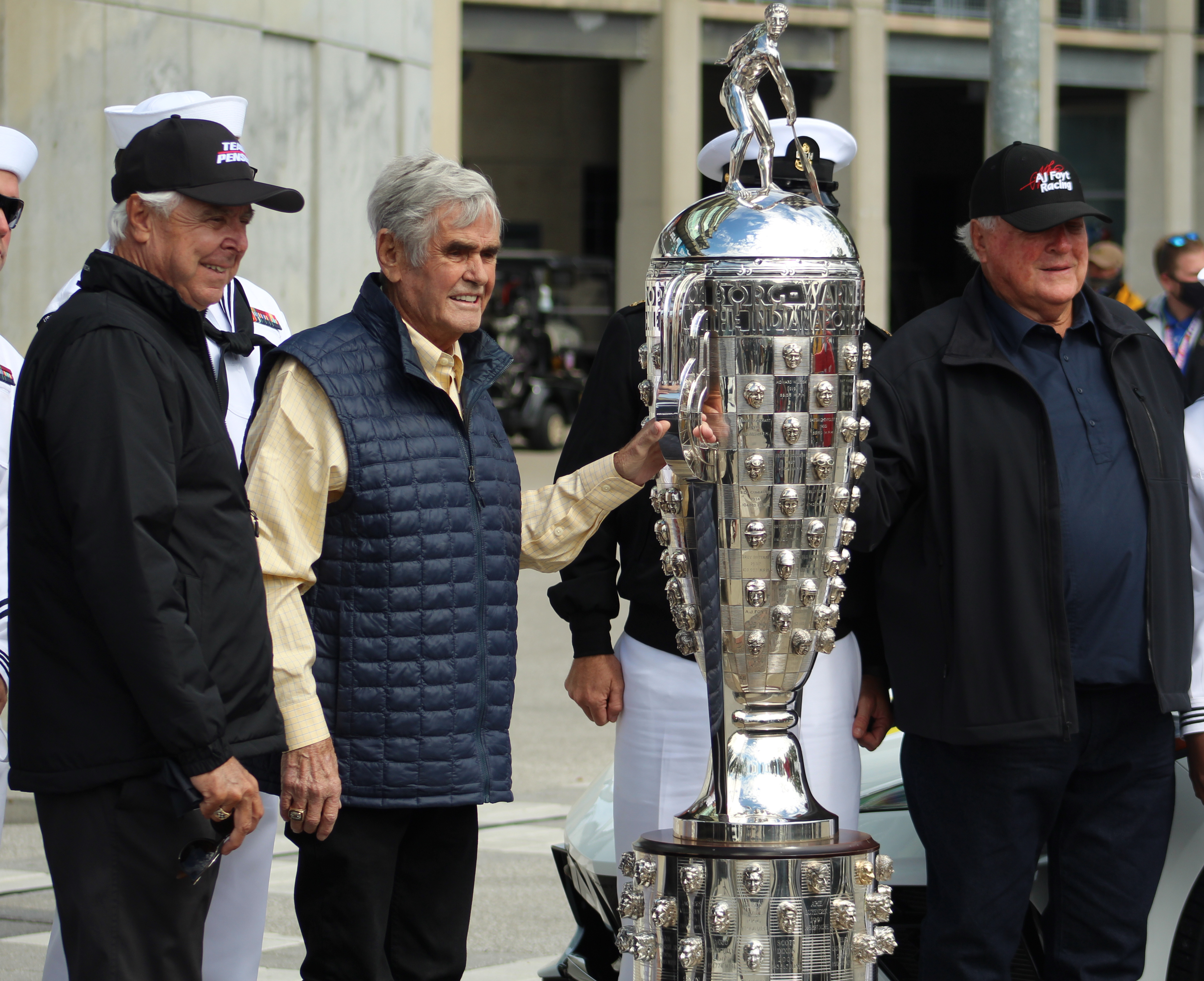
Hélio Castroneves (left), Rick Mears, Al Unser, and A. J. Foyt (right) are each four-time winners of the Indianapolis 500.

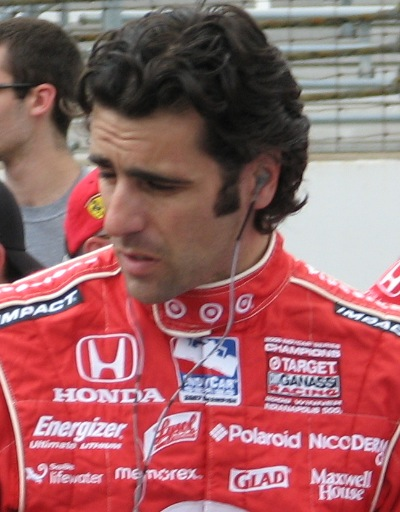
Dario Franchitti is the most recent driver to achieve three victories at the race.

Multiple victories by driver
Driver	Wins	Years
A. J. Foyt	4	1961, 1964, 1967, 1977
Al Unser	4	1970, 1971, 1978, 1987
Rick Mears	4	1979, 1984, 1988, 1991
Hélio Castroneves	4	2001, 2002, 2009, 2021
Louis Meyer	3	1928, 1933, 1936
Wilbur Shaw	3	1937, 1939, 1940
Mauri Rose	3	1941, 1947, 1948
Johnny Rutherford	3	1974, 1976, 1980
Bobby Unser	3	1968, 1975, 1981
Dario Franchitti	3	2007, 2010, 2012
Tommy Milton	2	1921, 1923
Bill Vukovich	2	1953, 1954
Rodger Ward	2	1959, 1962
Gordon Johncock	2	1973, 1982
Emerson Fittipaldi	2	1989, 1993
Al Unser Jr.	2	1992, 1994
Arie Luyendyk	2	1990, 1997
Dan Wheldon	2	2005, 2011
Juan Pablo Montoya	2	2000, 2015
Takuma Sato	2	2017, 2020
Josef Newgarden	2	2023, 2024

== By driver nationality ==
List of races won, by nationality of driver
Rank	License	Wins	Drivers
1	United States	78	55
2	United Kingdom	8	5
2	Brazil	8	4
4	France	3	3
4	Sweden	3	3
6	Colombia	2	1
6	Japan	2	1
6	Netherlands	2	1
9	Australia	1	1
9	Canada	1	1
9	New Zealand	1	1
9	Spain	1	1

== By team ==
Teams by number of Indianapolis 500s won
Teams	Wins	Year(s)
Team Penske	20	1972, 1979, 1981, 1984, 1985, 1987, 1988, 1991, 1993, 1994, 2001–2003, 2006, 2009, 2015, 2018, 2019, 2023, 2024
Andretti Autosport	6	1995, 2005, 2007, 2014, 2016, 2017
Chip Ganassi Racing	6	2000, 2008, 2010, 2012, 2022, 2025
Lou Moore	5	1938, 1941, 1947–1949
Leader Card Racing	3	1959, 1962, 1968
Patrick Racing	3	1973, 1982, 1989
Peugeot Auto Racing Company	2	1913, 1916
Duesenberg Automobile & Motors Company	2	1924, 1925
Harry Hartz	2	1930, 1932
Louis Meyer	2	1933, 1936
Boyle Racing Headquarters	2	1939, 1940
Howard B. Keck	2	1953, 1954
John Zink	2	1955, 1956
George Salih	2	1957, 1958
J. C. Agajanian	2	1952, 1963
Ansted-Thompson Racing	2	1964, 1967
Vel's Parnelli Jones Racing	2	1970, 1971
McLaren	2	1974, 1976
A. J. Foyt Enterprises	2	1977, 1999
Chaparral Cars	2	1978, 1980
Rahal Letterman Lanigan Racing	2	2004, 2020
Meyer Shank Racing	2	2021, 2026
Nordyke & Marmon Company	1	1911
National Motor Vehicle Company	1	1912
Louis Delâge Company	1	1914
E.C. Patterson	1	1915
Indianapolis Speedway Team	1	1919
William Small Company	1	1920
Louis Chevrolet	1	1921
Jimmy Murphy	1	1922
H.C.S. Motor Company	1	1923
Pete Kreis	1	1926
William S. White	1	1927
Alden Sampson II	1	1928
M. A. Yagle	1	1929
B. L. Schneider	1	1931
H. C. Henning	1	1934
Kelly Petillo	1	1935
Wilbur Shaw	1	1937
Thorne Engineering	1	1946
Kurtis Kraft	1	1950
Murrell Belanger	1	1951
Ken-Paul	1	1960
Bignotti-Bowes Racing	1	1961
Team Lotus	1	1965
Mecom Racing Team	1	1966
STP Corporation	1	1969
All American Racers	1	1975
Bignotti-Cotter	1	1983
Truesports	1	1986
Doug Shierson Racing	1	1990
Galles-Kraco Racing	1	1992
Hemelgarn Racing	1	1996
Treadway Racing	1	1997
Team Cheever	1	1998
Bryan Herta Autosport	1	2011
KV Racing Technology	1	2013

== By chassis make ==
Chassis makes by Indianapolis 500 victories
Make	Wins	Year(s)
Dallara	26	1998, 1999, 2001, 2002, 2005–2026 (Note: All chassis have been provided by Dallara since 2009.)
Penske	7	1979, 1981, 1988, 1989, 1991, 1993, 1994
Miller	6	1923, 1926, 1928, 1929, 1933, 1934
A. J. Watson	6	1956, 1959, 1960, 1962–1964
Kurtis Kraft	5	1950, 1951, 1953–1955
March	5	1983–1987
Duesenberg	4	1922, 1924, 1925, 1927
Wetteroth	4	1932, 1935, 1938, 1941
Panoz	4	1997, 2000, 2003, 2004
Peugeot	3	1913, 1916, 1919
Diedt	3	1947–1949
Eagle	3	1968, 1973, 1975
McLaren	3	1972, 1974, 1976
Lola	3	1966, 1978, 1990
Frontenac	2	1920, 1921
Stevens	2	1931, 1936
Maserati	2	1939, 1940
Salih	2	1957, 1958
Colt	2	1970, 1971
Coyote	2	1967, 1977
Reynard	2	1995, 1996
Marmon Motor Car Company	1	1911
National	1	1912
Delage	1	1914
Mercedes	1	1915
Summers	1	1930
Shaw	1	1937
Adams	1	1946
Kuzma	1	1952
Trevis	1	1961
Lotus	1	1965
Brawner Hawk	1	1969
Chaparral	1	1980
Wildcat	1	1982
Galmer	1	1992

== By engine make ==
Engine manufacturers by number of Indianapolis 500s won
Manufacturer	Wins	Year(s)
Offenhauser	27	1935, 1937, 1941, 1947–1964, 1968, 1972–1976
Honda	17	2004–2012, 2014, 2016, 2017, 2020–2022, 2025, 2026
Chevrolet	13	1988–1993, (Note: Built by Ilmor) 2002, 2013, 2015, 2018, 2019, 2023, 2024
Miller	12	1922, 1923, 1926, 1928–1934, 1936, 1938
Cosworth	10	1978–1987
Ford	8	1965–1967, 1969–1971, 1995, 1996
Oldsmobile	5	1997–2001
Peugeot	3	1913, 1916, 1919
Duesenberg	3	1924, 1925, 1927
Frontenac	2	1920, 1921
Maserati	2	1939, 1940
Mercedes-Benz	2	1915, 1994
Marmon	1	1911
National	1	1912
Delage	1	1914
Sparks	1	1946
Foyt	1	1977
Toyota	1	2003

== By tire make ==
Indianapolis 500 victories by tire manufacturer
Rank	Manufacturer		Wins	Year(s)
1	F	Firestone	77	1911, 1913, 1920–1941, 1946–1966, 1969–1971, 1996, 1997, 2000–2026 (Note: All tires have been provided by Firestone since 2000.)
2	G	Goodyear	29	1919, 1967, 1968, 1972–1995, 1998, 1999
3	BF	BFGoodrich	2	1915, 1916
4	M	Michelin	1	1912
4	P	Palmer Cord Tyres	1	1914
