= 2021 Indianapolis 500 =

American motor race

105th Indianapolis 500

Indianapolis Motor Speedway

Indianapolis 500
- Sanctioning body: INDYCAR
- Season: 2021 IndyCar season
- Date: May 30, 2021
- Winner: (Brazil) Hélio Castroneves
- Winning team: Meyer Shank Racing
- Winning Chief Mechanic: Matt Swan
- Time of race: 2:37:19.3846
- Average speed: 190.690 mph (306.886 km/h)
- Pole position: (New Zealand) Scott Dixon
- Pole speed: 231.685 mph (372.861 km/h)
- Fastest qualifier: (New Zealand) Scott Dixon
- Rookie of the Year: (New Zealand) Scott McLaughlin
- Most laps led: (United States) Conor Daly (40)

Pre-race ceremonies
- National anthem: Jimmie Allen
- "Back Home Again in Indiana": Jim Cornelison
- Starting command: Roger Penske
- Pace car: Chevrolet Corvette Stingray Convertible
- Pace car driver: Danica Patrick
- Starter: Aaron Likens
- Honorary starter: Milo Ventimiglia

Television in the United States
- Network: NBC
- Announcers: Leigh Diffey, Townsend Bell, Paul Tracy
- Nielsen ratings: 3.15 (5.58 million viewers)

Chronology
Previous	Next
2020	2022

Indianapolis Motor Speedway layout

The 2021 Indianapolis 500 (branded as the 105th Running of the Indianapolis 500 presented by Gainbridge for sponsorship reasons) was a 500-mile (800 km, 200 lap) race in the 2021 IndyCar Series, held on May 30, 2021, at the Indianapolis Motor Speedway in Speedway, Indiana. The month of May activities formally began on May 15 with the GMR Grand Prix on the combined road course. Practice for the Indianapolis 500 began on May 18, and time trials were held May 22–23. Carb Day, the traditional final day of practice, took place on May 28.

On April 21, 2021, the track management announced that due to the COVID-19 pandemic, the event would be held with a limit of 135,000 spectators, approximately 40% capacity. The previous year's race was postponed from May 24 to August 23, then ultimately held without spectators, as was the GMR Grand Prix (which was moved to July 4). The Intercontinental GT Challenge meeting in October 2020, which included the twin road course races for INDYCAR, carried a 10,000 spectator limit, with spectators restricted to grandstands in what are normally Turn 4 and Turn 1 on the oval (Turns 1–4 and Turns 12–14 on the road course).

Scott Dixon, the winner in 2008, won the pole position, and was a heavy favorite to win. Dixon, however, ran out of fuel during the first sequence of pit stops, as a result of a caution coming out, closing the pits and trapping him out on the track. He had to make a stop for emergency service, but the crew could not refire the stalled engine before he fell a lap down, and essentially out of contention. Two-time winner Takuma Sato (2017, 2020) was the defending champion, and led as late as lap 193, but he was off-sequence with the other leaders. Sato had to pit for fuel with seven laps to go, and finished 14th.

Three-time winner (2001, 2002, 2009), and four-time pole winner (2003, 2007, 2009, 2010) Hélio Castroneves took the lead for the final time on lap 199, and won his record-tying fourth Indianapolis 500 after dueling with second-year driver Álex Palou for most of the final 80 laps. The race set a new record for the fastest running of the Indianapolis 500, with an average speed at 190.690 mph (306.886 km/h), as well as a new record for most cars running at the finish (30). Castroneves joined Hall of Fame drivers A. J. Foyt, Al Unser Sr. and Rick Mears as four-time winners. After the race, Castroneves celebrated his victory by climbing the catch fence, his signature celebration, which had earned him the nickname "Spider-Man" early in his career. The race was also the first IndyCar Series victory for Meyer Shank Racing, and Castroneves' most recent as of 2026.

== Race background ==
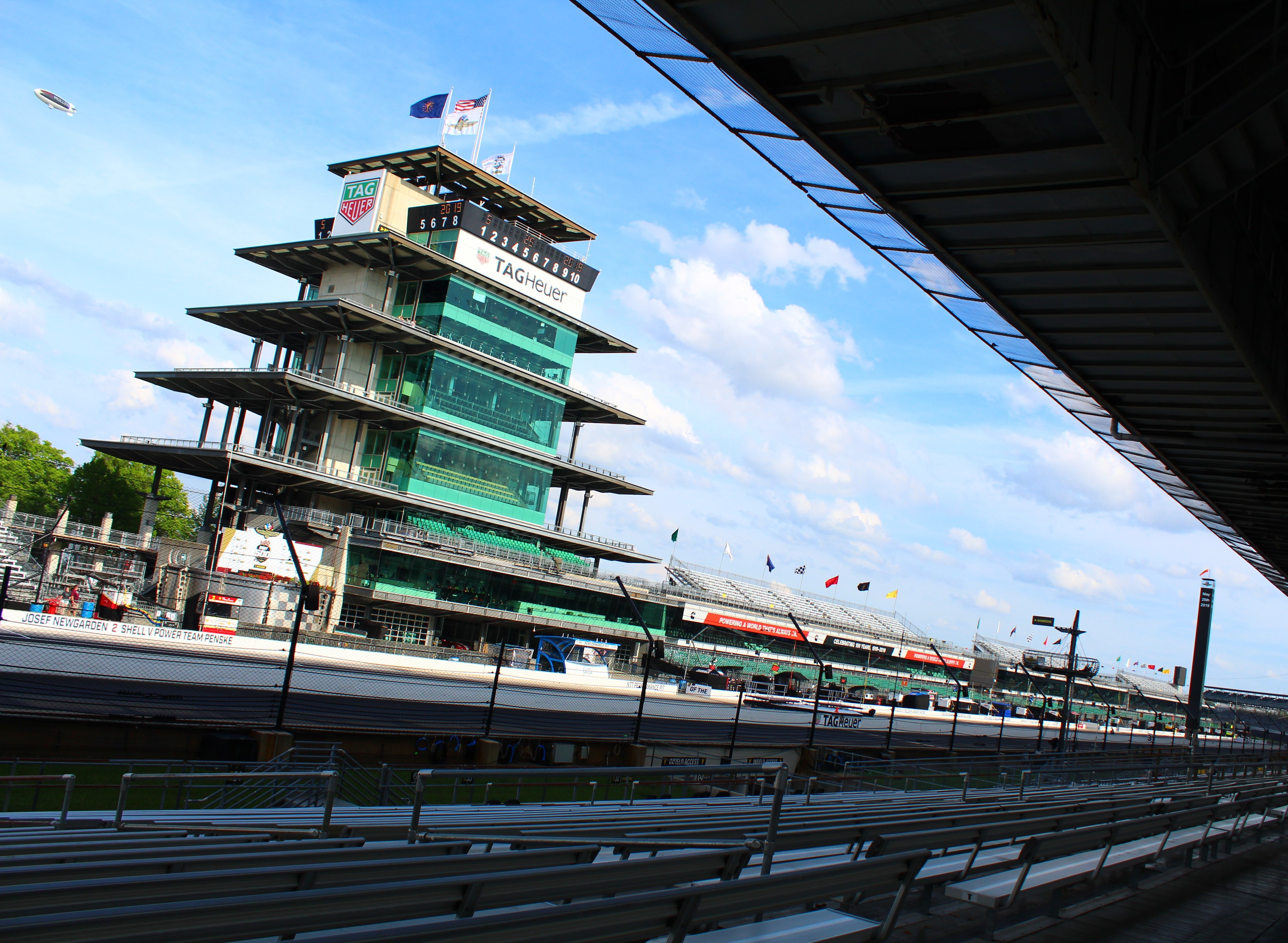
The Pagoda, the control tower which houses officials, broadcasting, and hospitality suites, is an icon at the Indianapolis Motor Speedway.

=== Sponsorship ===
On January 31, 2019, it was announced that the online financial services company Gainbridge would become the new presenting sponsor of the 500 under a four-year deal. This will be the third year under the current deal.

=== Rule changes ===
- The temperature requirement rule was changed to "45-45". That required both the ambient temperature to be 45 °F (7 °C) or higher, and the track surface temperature to be 45 °F (7 °C) or higher before cars were allowed out on the circuit. Previously the rule was "50-50".
- The Last Chance qualifying session was expanded to 75 minutes in order to allow multiple qualifying attempts for each participant. In 2019 participants were permitted only one attempt. This change was supposed to be implemented for 2020, however, only 33 cars were entered and the 2020 Last Chance qualifying session was cancelled.
- Each entry was allowed 34 total sets of tires (Firestone), for practice, time trials, and for the race. Entries taking part in the Rookie Orientation Program received an additional three sets for use during that session. Entries taking part in a Refresher Test received two additional sets for use during that session. From 2015 to 2019, teams were permitted 36 total sets. In 2020, teams were also allowed 34 sets, however, there was one fewer day of practice in 2020 compared to 2021.

=== Event changes ===
- Due to the COVID-19 pandemic, for the second year in a row, the annual Pit Stop Challenge was not held. In addition, the Carb Day concert and Snake Pit concerts were also cancelled.
- Allen Bestwick joined the public address system at the Speedway. Announcer and former radio and television "Voice of the 500" Bob Jenkins reduced his schedule while battling brain cancer. Jenkins died August 9, 2021.

=== 2021 IndyCar Series ===
The 2021 Indianapolis 500 was the sixth race of the 2021 NTT IndyCar Series season. Five different drivers won the first five races of the season, including three first-time winners. Álex Palou won the season opener at Birmingham, his first career IndyCar Series win. The following week, Colton Herta won at St. Petersburg. A doubleheader weekend at Texas saw Scott Dixon and first-time victor Pato O'Ward as race winners. The GMR Grand Prix kicked off the month of May at Indianapolis on May 15, won by Rinus VeeKay, the third first-time winner of the season. Scott Dixon entered the Indianapolis 500 as the series points leader. For the first time since 2013, Team Penske failed to win a race prior to the Indy 500.

== Race schedules ==
The 2021 IndyCar Series schedule was announced on October 1, 2020. The Indianapolis 500 returned to its traditional Memorial Day weekend date after being delayed to August 23 in 2020 due to the COVID-19 pandemic. The race was scheduled for Sunday, May 30, the 54th time the race has been held on May 30. From 1911 to 1970, the race was scheduled for May 30 regardless of the day of the week, as Memorial Day at the time was a fixed-date holiday. During that period, if May 30 fell on a Sunday, the race was scheduled for Monday, May 31. Since 1974, the race has traditionally been scheduled for the Sunday of Memorial Day weekend.

Practice, time trials, and other ancillary events were scheduled for the two weeks leading up to the race. The Freedom 100, however, was not held as the 2021 Indy Lights season only included a race on the road course during GMR Grand Prix weekend.

The GMR Grand Prix returned to the month of May, again serving as the opening weekend of track activity. The Road to Indy held doubleheader races on both Friday and Saturday, while IndyCar held practice and qualifying on Friday, and their race on Saturday. In 2020, due to the COVID-19 pandemic, the IndyCar event was moved to July 4 (as part of the NASCAR weekend), the Road to Indy events were moved to September, and a second IndyCar road course event (Harvest GP) was held in October as part of the Intercontinental GT weekend. The 2020 GMR Grand Prix was held without spectators, while the October Harvest GP races were held with a maximum of 10,000 spectators.

Race schedules — May 2021
Sun	Mon	Tue	Wed	Thu	Fri	Sat
9	10	11	12	13; Road to Indy	14; Road to Indy; IndyCar; Qualifying	15; Road to Indy; GMR Grand Prix
16	17	18; Practice	19; Practice	20; Practice	21; Practice; Fast Friday	22; Time Trials
23; Time Trials	24	25	26	27	28; Carb Day	29; Legends Day
30; Indianapolis; 500	31; Memorial; Day					

Color	Notes
Green	Practice
Dark Blue	Time trials
Silver	Race day
Red	Rained out*
Blank	No track activity

* Includes days where track
activity was significantly limited due to rain

Source: 2021 Indianapolis 500 Event Schedule

== Entry list ==
The entry list for the 2021 Indianapolis 500 was released on May 12, 2021. Thirty-five entries appeared on the list, including nine former race winners and three rookies. With thirty-five entries, bumping returned for the first time since 2019. An expected 36th entry for driver Cody Ware set to drive for Dale Coyne Racing with Rick Ware Racing was withdrawn shortly before the entry list was released due to lack of sponsorship. All entries utilized the Dallara DW12 chassis with the Universal Aero Kit 18, with Firestone tires. The nine former Indy 500 winners making the field the most since there were ten in 1992.

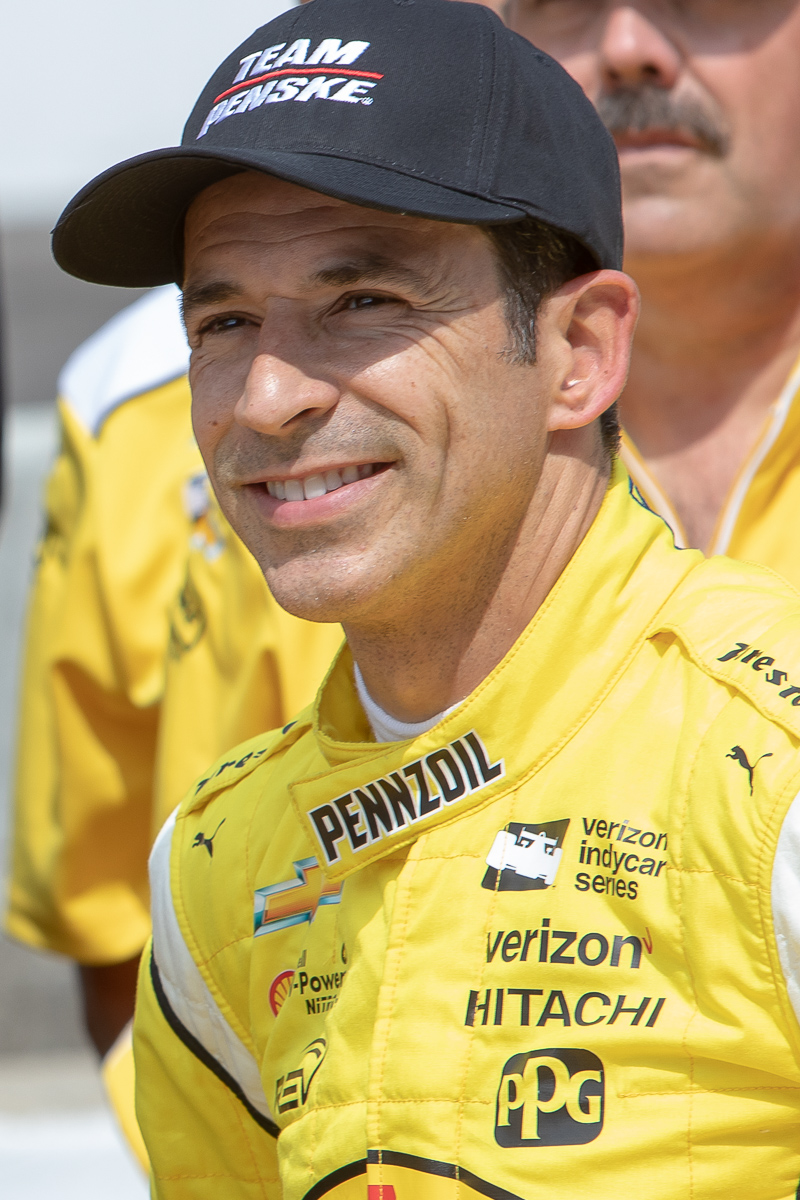
Three-time Indy 500 winner Hélio Castroneves (2001, 2002, 2009) has the most previous starts in the field with 20.

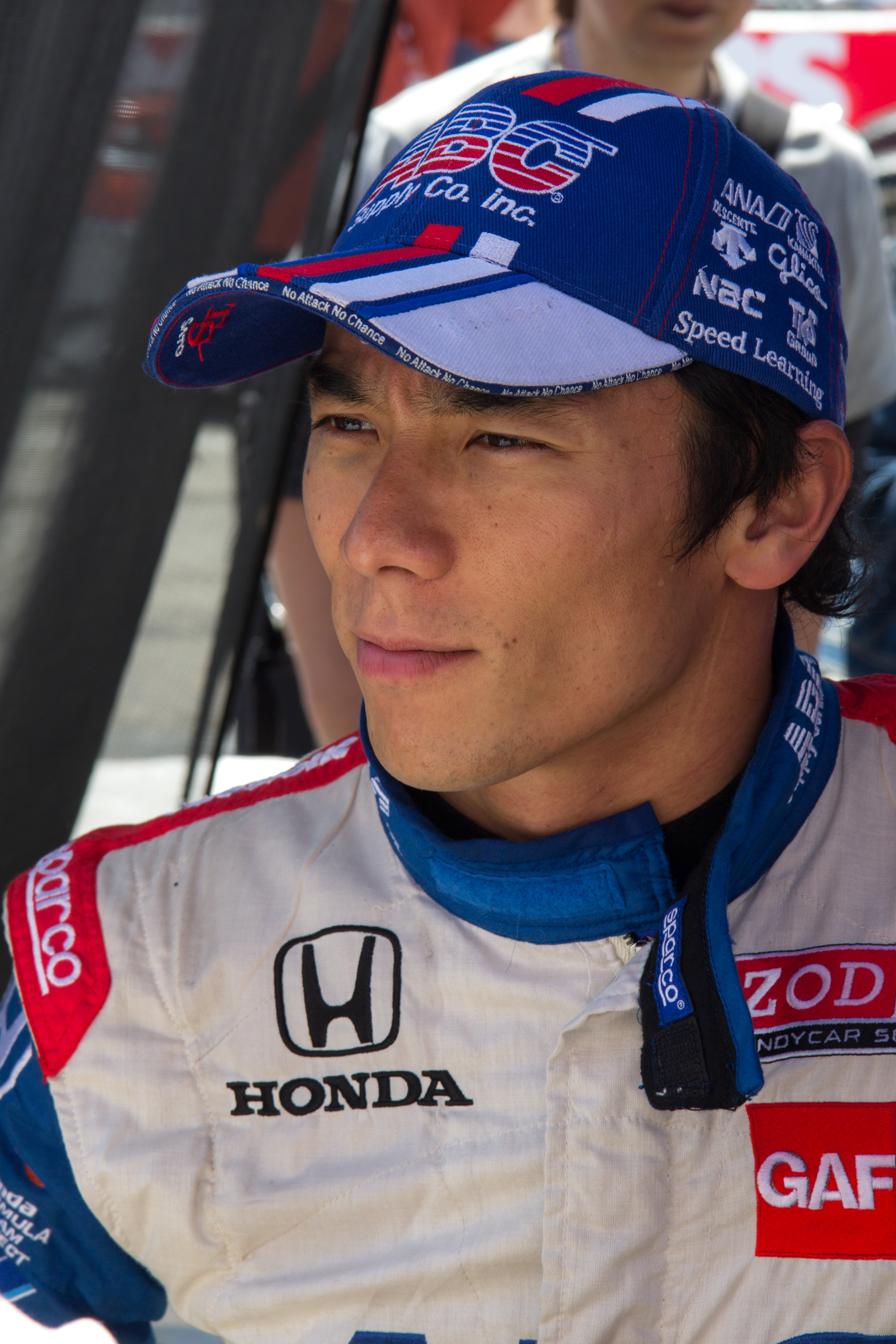
Defending winner Takuma Sato won the race in 2017 and 2020.

No.	Driver	Team	Engine
1 (Note: Chip Ganassi Racing (Scott Dixon) is entitled to utilize car No. 1 as the 2020 IndyCar Series champion, but declined in favor of keeping the No. 9 for marketing purposes. IndyCar, Ganassi, and A. J. Foyt Enterprises agreed and arranged to assign car No. 1 to the J. R. Hildebrand Foyt entry to commemorate the 60th anniversary of A. J. Foyt's first Indianapolis 500 victory.)	(United States) J. R. Hildebrand	A. J. Foyt Enterprises	Chevrolet
2	(United States) Josef Newgarden	Team Penske	Chevrolet
3	(New Zealand) Scott McLaughlin R	Team Penske	Chevrolet
4	(Canada) Dalton Kellett	A. J. Foyt Enterprises	Chevrolet
5	(Mexico) Patricio O'Ward	Arrow McLaren SP	Chevrolet
06	(Brazil) Hélio Castroneves W	Meyer Shank Racing (Note: Meyer Shank Racing has a technical alliance with Andretti Autosport.)	Honda
7	(Sweden) Felix Rosenqvist	Arrow McLaren SP	Chevrolet
8	(Sweden) Marcus Ericsson	Chip Ganassi Racing	Honda
9	(New Zealand) Scott Dixon W	Chip Ganassi Racing	Honda
10	(Spain) Álex Palou	Chip Ganassi Racing	Honda
11	(United States) Charlie Kimball	A. J. Foyt Enterprises	Chevrolet
12	(Australia) Will Power W	Team Penske	Chevrolet
14	(France) Sébastien Bourdais	A. J. Foyt Enterprises	Chevrolet
15	(United States) Graham Rahal	Rahal Letterman Lanigan Racing	Honda
16	(Switzerland) Simona de Silvestro	Paretta Autosport (Note: Paretta Autosport has a technical alliance with Team Penske.)	Chevrolet
18	(United Arab Emirates) Ed Jones	Dale Coyne Racing with Vasser-Sullivan	Honda
20	(United States) Ed Carpenter	Ed Carpenter Racing	Chevrolet
21	(Netherlands) Rinus VeeKay	Ed Carpenter Racing	Chevrolet
22	(France) Simon Pagenaud W	Team Penske	Chevrolet
24	(United States) Sage Karam	Dreyer & Reinbold Racing	Chevrolet
25	(United Kingdom) Stefan Wilson	Andretti Autosport	Honda
26	(United States) Colton Herta	Andretti Autosport w/ Curb-Agajanian	Honda
27	(United States) Alexander Rossi W	Andretti Autosport	Honda
28	(United States) Ryan Hunter-Reay W	Andretti Autosport	Honda
29	(Canada) James Hinchcliffe	Andretti Steinbrenner Autosport	Honda
30	(Japan) Takuma Sato W	Rahal Letterman Lanigan Racing	Honda
45	(United States) Santino Ferrucci	Rahal Letterman Lanigan Racing	Honda
47	(United States) Conor Daly	Ed Carpenter Racing	Chevrolet
48	(Brazil) Tony Kanaan W	Chip Ganassi Racing	Honda
51	(Brazil) Pietro Fittipaldi R	Dale Coyne Racing with Rick Ware Racing	Honda
59	(United Kingdom) Max Chilton	Carlin	Chevrolet
60	(United Kingdom) Jack Harvey	Meyer Shank Racing	Honda
75	(United States) R. C. Enerson R	Top Gun Racing	Chevrolet
86	(Colombia) Juan Pablo Montoya W	Arrow McLaren SP	Chevrolet
98	(United States) Marco Andretti	Andretti Herta-Haupert Autosport with Marco Andretti & Curb-Agajanian	Honda
OFFICIAL REPORT

- W Former Indianapolis 500 Winner
- R Indianapolis 500 Rookie

== Testing and Rookie Orientation ==
=== October 2020 ===
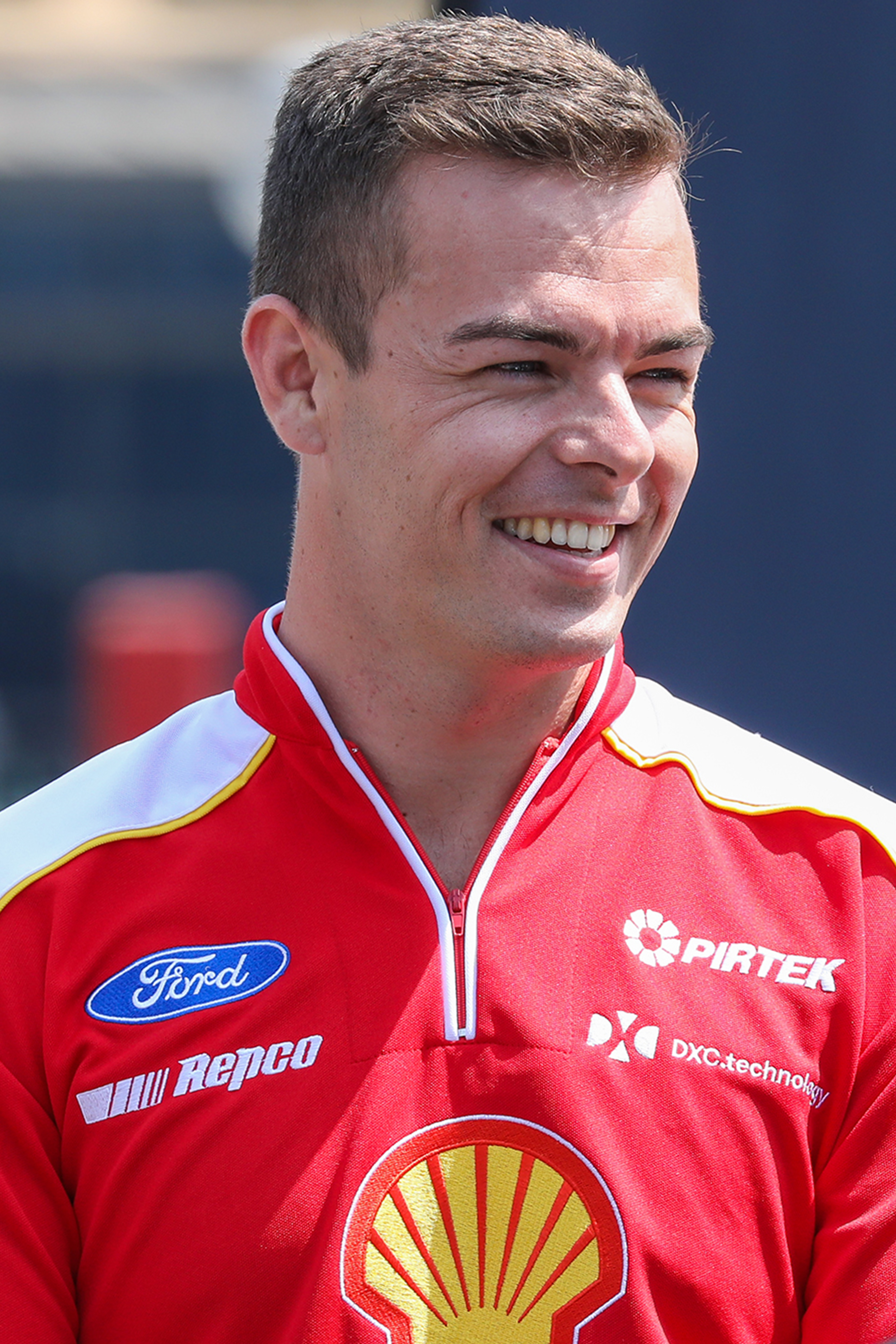
Scott McLaughlin passed rookie orientation during testing in October.

An offseason test was scheduled at the Indianapolis Motor Speedway during the last week of October after the conclusion of the 2020 season. On Wednesday, October 28, Takuma Sato (Rahal) and Josef Newgarden (Penske) conducted test runs utilizing new aerodynamic pieces and configurations. Rain delayed the start of the session from 11 a.m. to approximately 12:30 p.m. Rookie Scott McLaughlin (Penske) completed the mandatory Rookie Orientation during the afternoon.

Track activity for Thursday, October 29 was rescheduled to Friday, October 30 due to a poor weather forecast.

On Friday, October 30, Sato and Newgarden were joined by Ryan Hunter-Reay (Andretti), Ed Carpenter (ECR), Pato O’Ward (Arrow McLaren SP), and Scott Dixon (Ganassi). The six-car session primarily focused on evaluation of new aerodynamic configurations in traffic. Cool temperatures delayed the start of track activity until approximately 12:15 p.m. No incidents were reported.

=== Engine hybridization test ===
A special oval test was held on Friday, March 26 at the Indianapolis Motor Speedway. It was originally planned for earlier in the week, but poor weather pushed it to Friday. The series oversaw test runs to attempt to replicate the effects of racing with KERS, which will be part of the new hybrid engine package scheduled to debut in 2023. Four entries, two Chevrolet and two Honda, took laps in choreographed sessions. The KERS simulation was implemented utilizing the existing Push-to-pass system. The drivers and teams involved were Scott Dixon (Ganassi), Josef Newgarden (Penske), Alexander Rossi (Andretti), and Pato O’Ward (Arrow McLaren SP).

No incidents were reported. Following the test, reactions from the drivers were mixed to negative. The horsepower increases were in the range of 50–60 HP, resulting in straight-line speed increases of 5–7 mph.

=== Open test — Thursday, April 8 ===
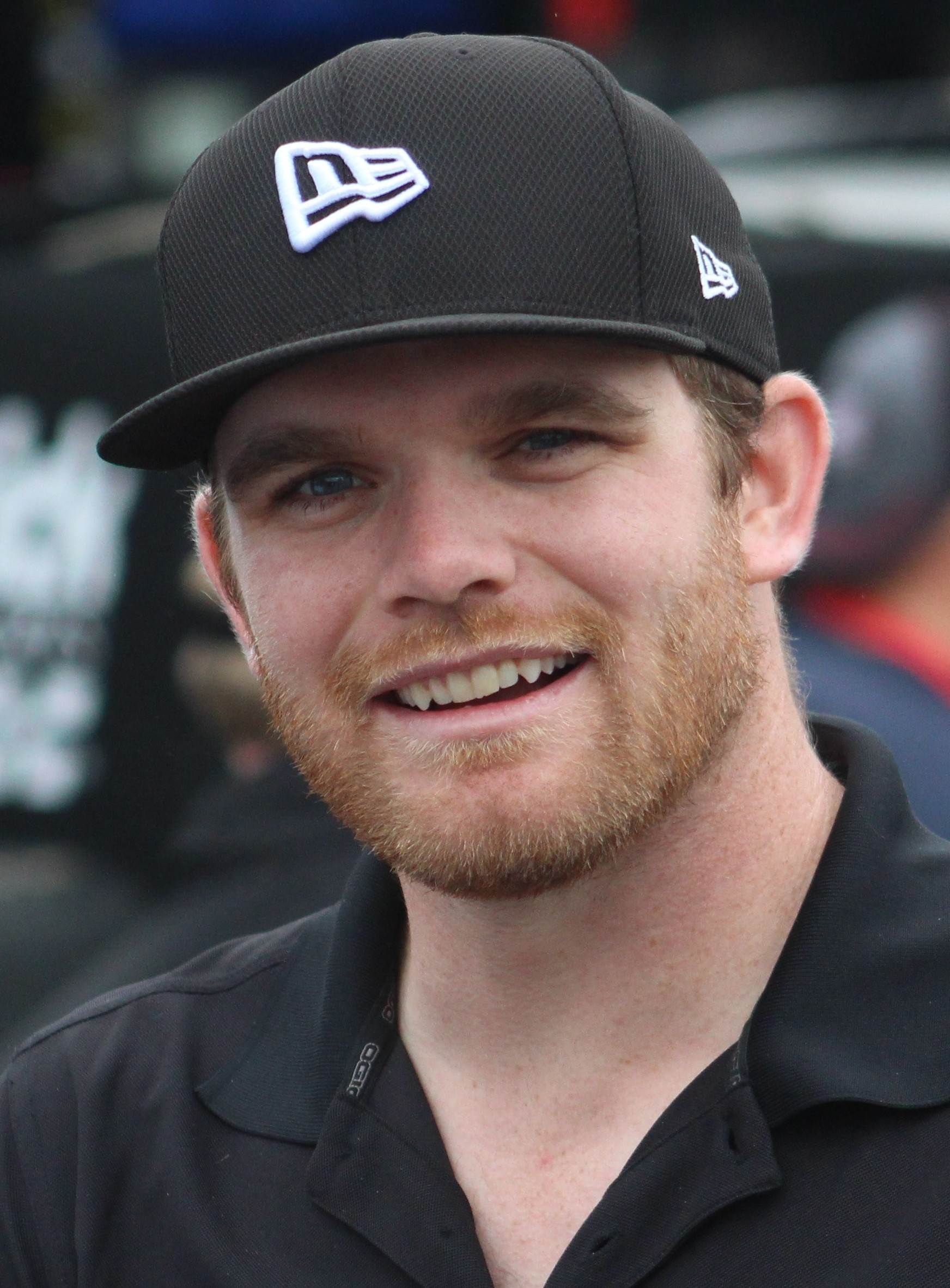
Conor Daly set the fastest lap during the first session of testing.

- Weather: 65 °F (18 °C), wind up to 21 mph, rain showers in afternoon
- Summary: A full-field open test on the oval at the Indianapolis Motor Speedway was scheduled for April 8–9. A total of 32 car and driver combinations were scheduled to participate. Testing was scheduled to begin at 11 a.m., with a two-hour session for veteran drivers (21 eligible), followed by a two-hour session for rookie orientation and veteran refresher tests. The final three hours was to be open to all participants, including those that passed their tests in the previous session. Just twelve minutes into the session, Rinus VeeKay suffered a hard crash in turn one on his fifth lap, resulting in a broken finger. Rain at approximately 12:45 p.m. ended the day early for veterans. Conor Daly was fastest overall, with a lap at 222.714 mph (358.423 km/h), while Colton Herta set the fastest "no-tow" lap at 219.846 mph (353.808 km/h). After the rain subsided, the track was opened for rookie orientation and veteran refresher tests from about 6:00 p.m. to 7:15 p.m.

Top Practice Speeds
Pos	No.	Driver	Team	Engine	Speed (mph)	Speed (km/h)
1	47	(United States) Conor Daly	Ed Carpenter Racing	Chevrolet	222.714	358.423
2	20	(United States) Ed Carpenter	Ed Carpenter Racing	Chevrolet	221.296	356.141
3	9	(New Zealand) Scott Dixon	Chip Ganassi Racing	Honda	220.575	354.981
OFFICIAL REPORT

=== Rookie Orientation / Refresher tests — Thursday, April 8 ===
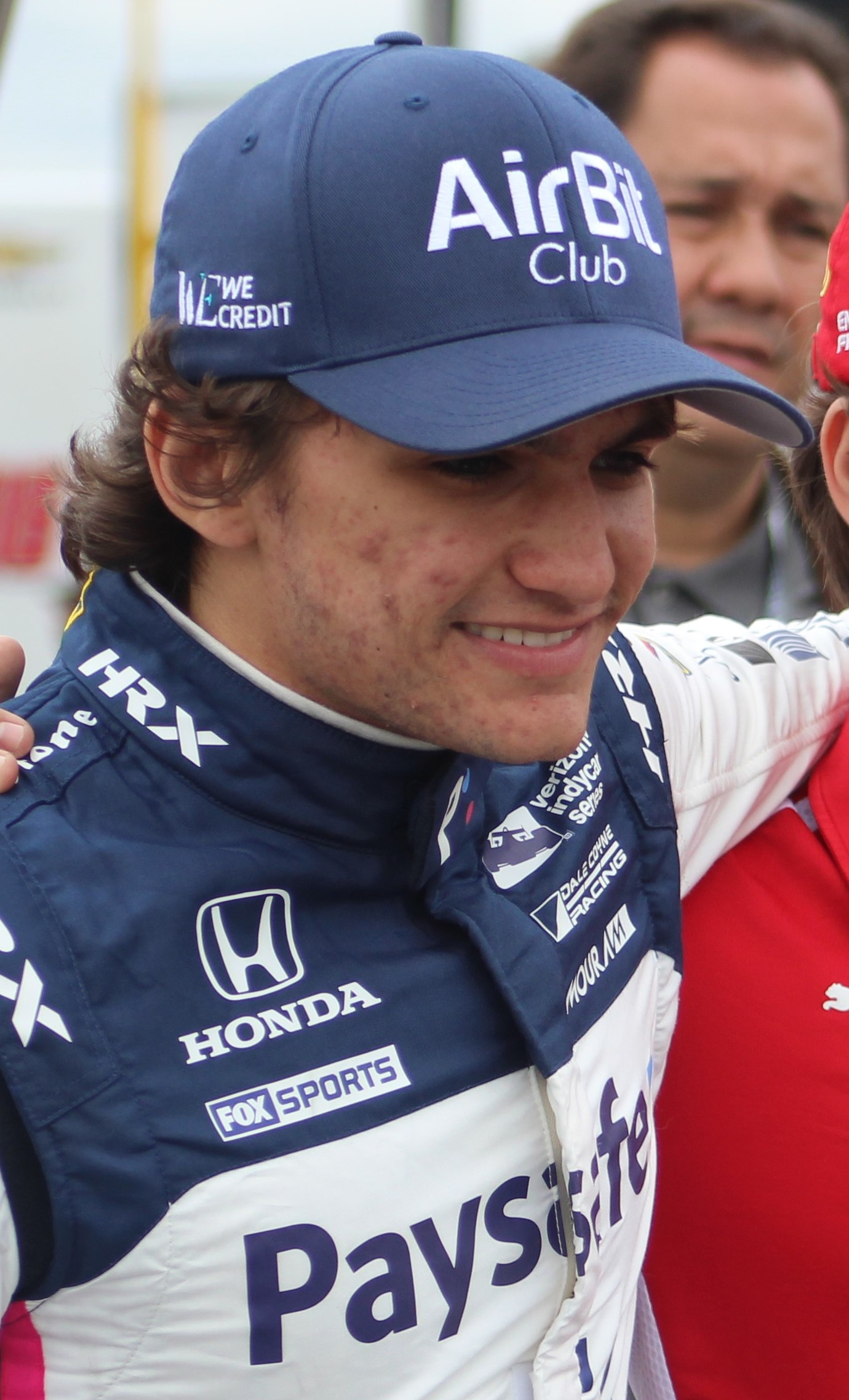
Pietro Fittipaldi, grandson of two-time Indy 500 winner Emerson Fittipaldi, took part in Rookie Orientation.

- Summary: The rookie orientation and veteran refresher programs began just after 6:00 p.m. after track drying from earlier rain had been completed. A total of eleven cars took to the track during the session, with many drivers completing their refreshers. Sébastien Bourdais was fastest during the roughly 1 hour session, turning a lap at 224.427 mph (361.180 km/h). There were no major incidents, and the practice was only halted once for a track inspection. The rookie orientation test for 2021 consisted of three stages: 10 laps between 205 and 210 mph, 15 laps between 210 and 215 mph, and 15 laps over 215 mph. The veteran refresher test consisted of only the second and third phases.

Top Practice Speeds
Pos	No.	Driver	Team	Engine	Speed (mph)	Speed (km/h)
1	14	(France) Sébastien Bourdais	A. J. Foyt Enterprises	Chevrolet	224.427	361.180
2	24	(United States) Sage Karam	Dreyer & Reinbold Racing	Chevrolet	222.048	357.352
3	06	(Brazil) Hélio Castroneves	Meyer Shank Racing	Honda	221.097	355.821
OFFICIAL REPORT

=== Open test — Friday, April 9 ===
- Weather: 78 °F (26 °C), Mostly cloudy with brief rain showers around mid-day
- Summary: Testing time was extended to make up for the previous day's truncated session, with the track now opening at 9:00 a.m. and closing at 6:00 p.m. 31 of the 32 entered cars for the test took to the track, with only Rinus VeeKay absent due to the damage sustained to his car in the previous day's wreck. The session was briefly interrupted just before noon for rain, but was resumed shortly thereafter. No major incidents occurred. Josef Newgarden turned the fastest lap of the open test at 226.819 mph (365.030 km/h). Graham Rahal had the fastest "no-tow" speed at 221.949 mph (357.192 km/h).

Top Practice Speeds
Pos	No.	Driver	Team	Engine	Speed (mph)	Speed (km/h)
1	2	(United States) Josef Newgarden	Team Penske	Chevrolet	226.819	365.030
2	30	(Japan) Takuma Sato	Rahal Letterman Lanigan Racing	Honda	226.396	364.349
3	86	(Colombia) Juan Pablo Montoya	Arrow McLaren SP	Chevrolet	226.123	363.910
OFFICIAL REPORT

== Practice ==
=== Opening Day — Tuesday, May 18 ===
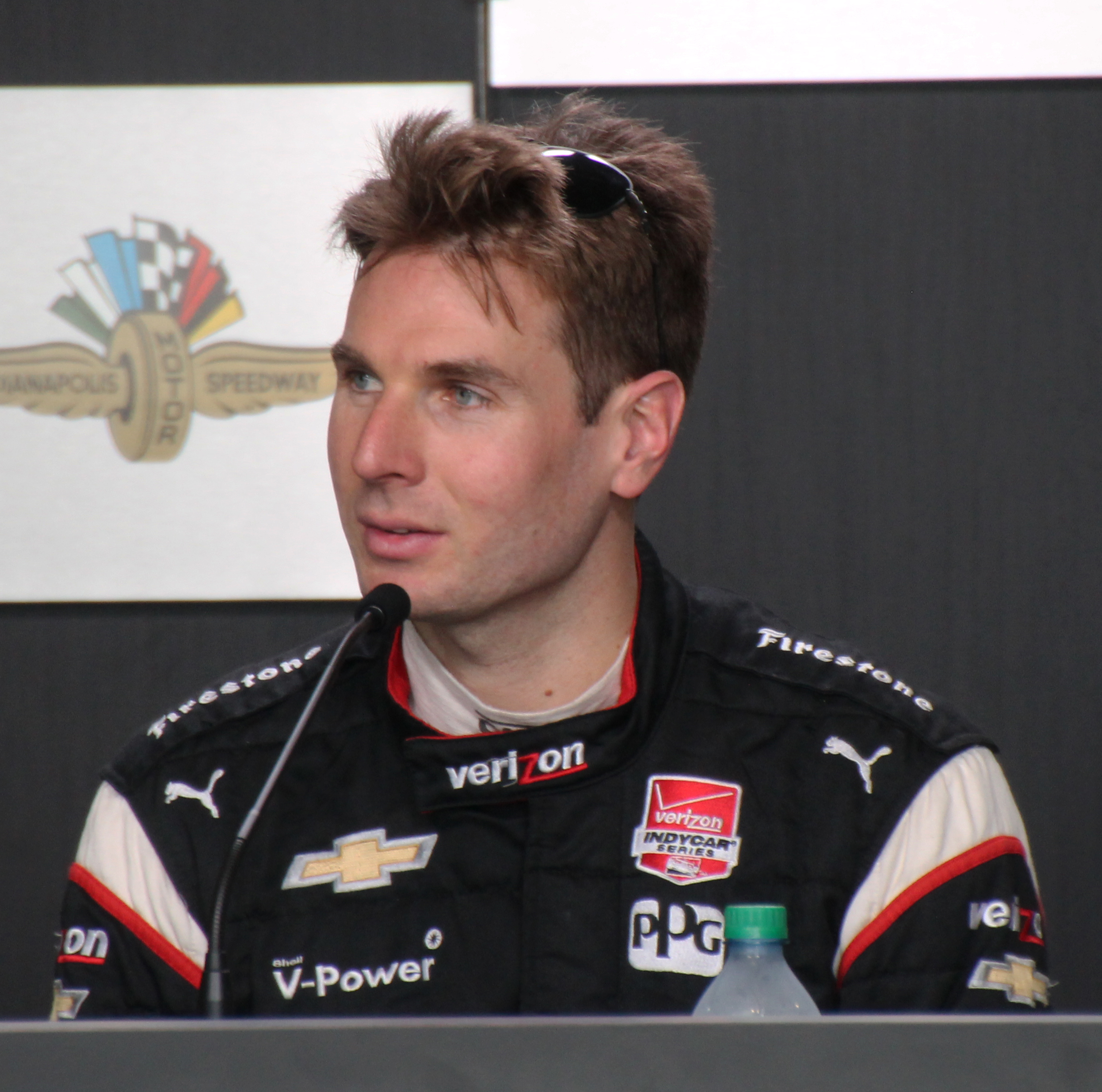
Will Power was the fastest driver on opening day of practice.

- Weather: 73 °F (23 °C), Cloudy with occasional light rain
- Summary: The opening day of practice was divided into three sessions. The first session was open to veteran drivers, the second to drivers needing to complete Rookie and Refresher tests, and the third open to all drivers. Graham Rahal was fastest in the first session of the day, running a lap at 223.449 mph (359.606 km/h). Max Chilton had minor mishap when a helmet air ventilation hose became dislodged from the cockpit and wrapped around the rear wing. Light rain interrupted veteran practice three times and caused a delay in the start of rookie/refresher testing. Rookie and refresher testing began just after 2:00 p.m. Only three drivers, R. C. Enerson, J. R. Hildebrand, and Stefan Wilson, were eligible and took part in the session. Both Hildebrand and Wilson completed both phases of their refresher tests. Enerson completed the first of three phases of his rookie test, but suffered a grease leak from the car's drive axle that prevented him from continuing. Enerson and Top Gun Racing did not return for the remainder of the day. Full field practice began almost immediately after the conclusion of the rookie and refresher session. Will Power set the fastest time of the day, running a lap at 226.470 mph (364.468 km/h). Ed Carpenter held the fastest "no-tow" speed - a lap set without the assistance of drafting - at 219.162 mph (352.707 km/h). The only significant incident of the session came at roughly 4:45 p.m. when Sébastien Bourdais's car caught fire behind the right sidepod after an apparent engine failure.

Top Practice Speeds
Pos	No.	Driver	Team	Engine	Speed (mph)	Speed (km/h)
1	12	(Australia) Will Power	Team Penske	Chevrolet	226.470	364.468
2	28	(United States) Ryan Hunter-Reay	Andretti Autosport	Honda	226.371	364.309
3	30	(Japan) Takuma Sato	Rahal Letterman Lanigan Racing	Honda	226.132	363.924
OFFICIAL REPORT

=== Wednesday, May 19 ===
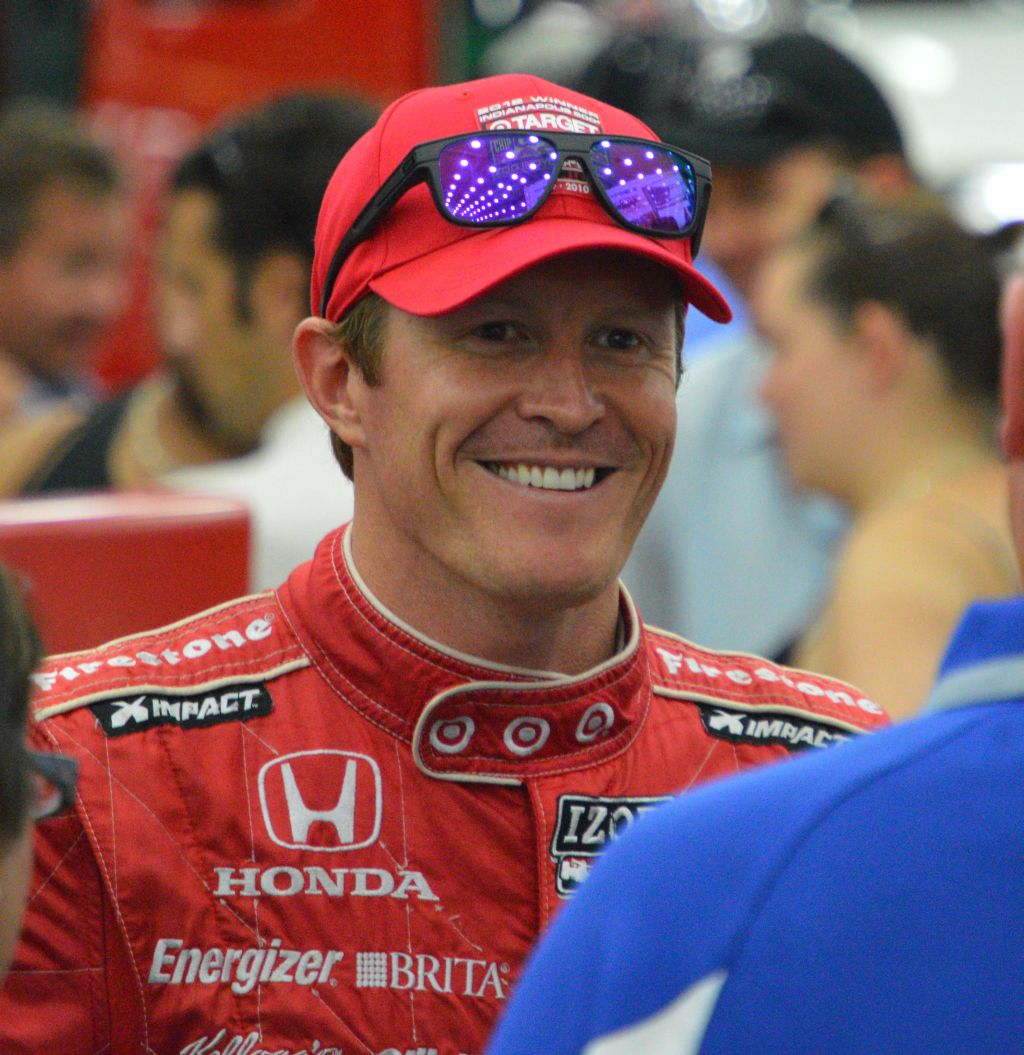
Scott Dixon set the fastest lap in the second practice session.

- Weather: 79 °F (26 °C), Mostly cloudy
- Summary: The track opened at 11:00 a.m. with a one-hour session for R. C. Enerson to complete the remainder of his rookie orientation testing. Enerson completed the last two stages of the test, but did not appear for the rest of the day after finishing. The track was opened to all competitors at 12:15 p.m. and remained open until 6:15 p.m. Scott Dixon was the fastest driver of the day, running a lap at 226.829 mph (365.046 km/h). Alexander Rossi set the fastest no-tow lap at 221.114 mph (355.848 km/h). There were no significant incidents during the session.

Top Practice Speeds
Pos	No.	Driver	Team	Engine	Speed (mph)	Speed (km/h)
1	9	(New Zealand) Scott Dixon	Chip Ganassi Racing	Honda	226.829	365.046
2	47	(United States) Conor Daly	Ed Carpenter Racing	Chevrolet	226.372	364.310
3	20	(United States) Ed Carpenter	Ed Carpenter Racing	Chevrolet	226.103	363.878
OFFICIAL REPORT

=== Thursday, May 20 ===
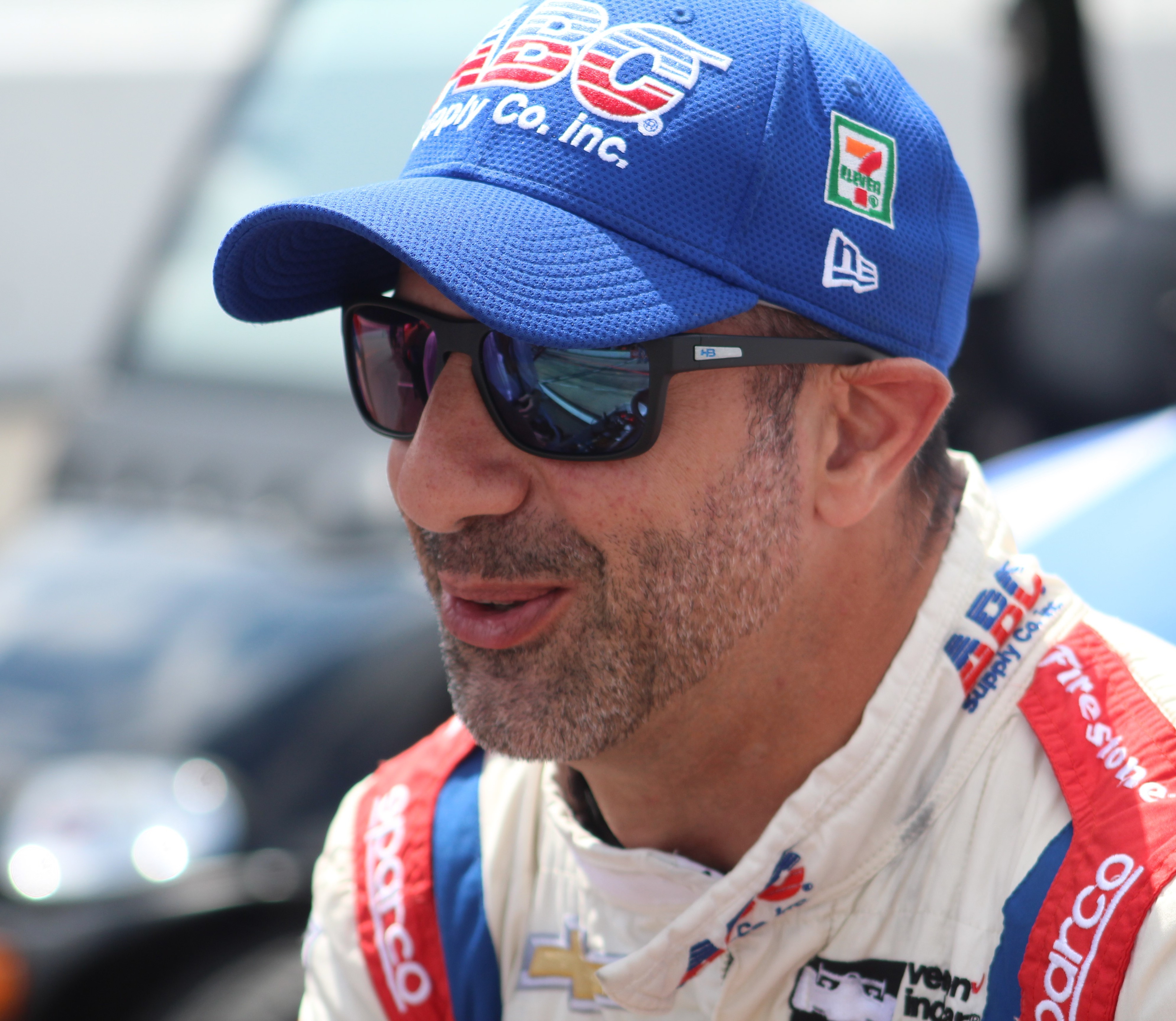
Tony Kanaan was fastest on Thursday.

- Weather: 83 °F (28 °C), Mostly cloudy
- Summary: Higher temperatures resulted in lower speeds and reduced running in the heat of the day. Practice began with an unannounced photo op by the three Rahal Letterman Lanigan Racing cars down the frontstretch. The slow speed of the Rahal cars caught other competitors off-guard and resulted in a minor collision between Scott McLaughlin and Colton Herta. The Rahal team was later penalized for the incident with all three cars being not allowed to participate in the first thirty minutes of Friday's session. The first major incident of the week came at 4:14 p.m., when Santino Ferrucci lost control of his car and impacted the wall in turn two. Ferrucci required assistance walking to the medical car and was later sent to Methodist Hospital for examination of potential injuries to his left leg. Despite the wreck, Ferrucci was still the third fastest driver on the day. Tony Kanaan was the fastest driver of the day, turning a lap at 225.341 mph (362.651 km/h). Jack Harvey held the fastest no-tow lap, running at 222.090 mph (357.419 km/h). For the first time during the week, all 35 entries participated in a full-field practice session.

Top Practice Speeds
Pos	No.	Driver	Team	Engine	Speed (mph)	Speed (km/h)
1	48	(Brazil) Tony Kanaan	Chip Ganassi Racing	Honda	225.341	362.651
2	47	(United States) Conor Daly	Ed Carpenter Racing	Chevrolet	225.245	362.497
3	45	(United States) Santino Ferrucci	Rahal Letterman Lanigan Racing	Honda	224.922	361.977
OFFICIAL REPORT

=== Fast Friday — Friday, May 21 ===
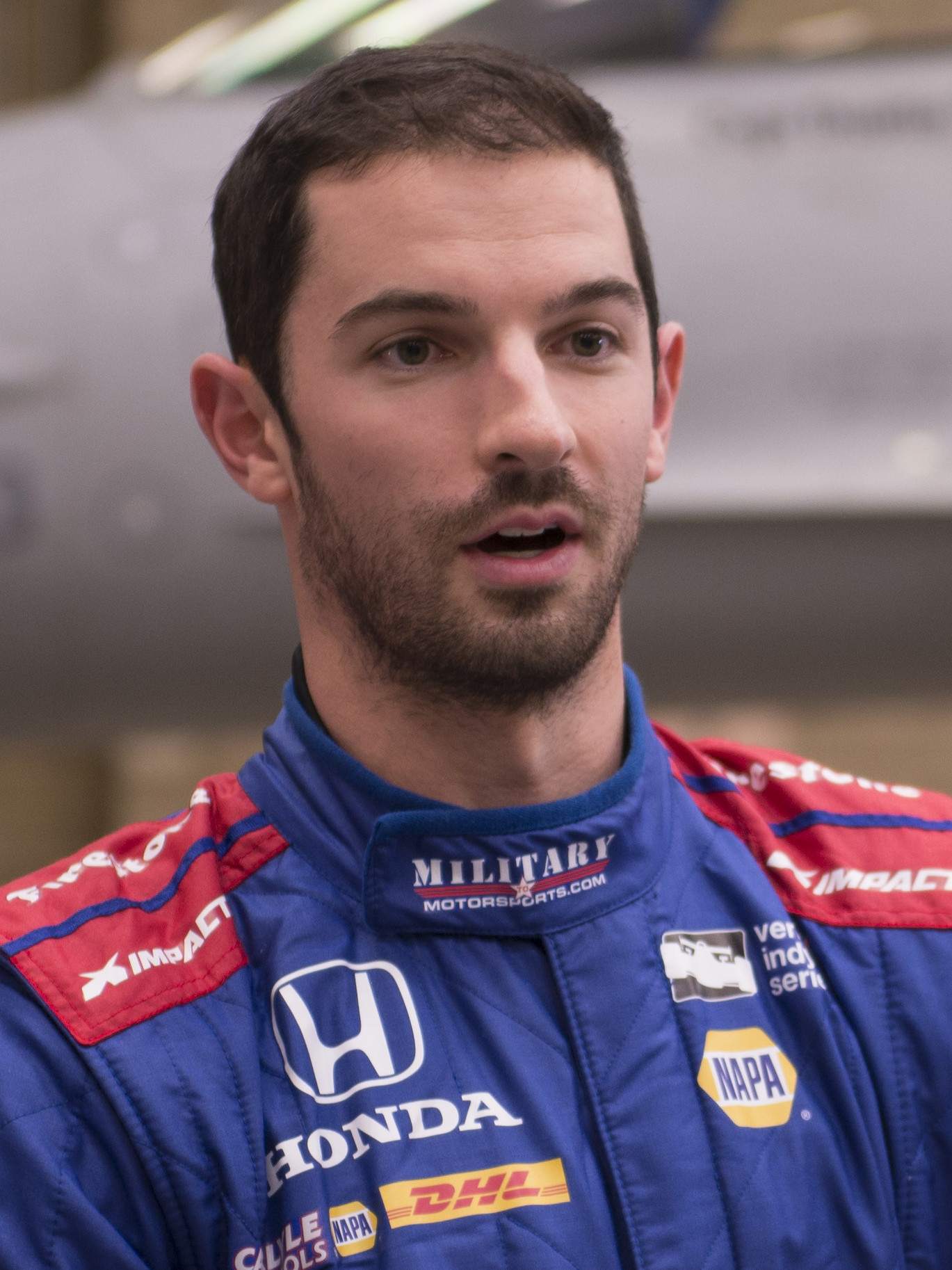
Alexander Rossi had the fastest "no-tow" speed on Fast Friday

- Weather: 82 °F (28 °C), Fair
- Summary: Friday saw engine boost pressures increased in preparation for qualifying runs over the weekend. Honda powered cars dominated the day, taking 12 of the top 15 spots in the speed charts. Scott Dixon was fastest of all during the session, turning a lap at 233.302 mph (375.463 km/h). Alexander Rossi held the fastest no-tow lap at 231.597 mph (372.719 km/h). Marcus Ericsson put together the fastest 4-lap average - a simulation of a full qualification run - at 231.950 mph (373.287 km/h). No major incidents occurred during the day. Following the session, the draw for qualifying order was held.

Top Practice Speeds
Pos	No.	Driver	Team	Engine	Speed (mph)	Speed (km/h)
1	9	(New Zealand) Scott Dixon	Chip Ganassi Racing	Honda	233.302	375.463
2	26	(United States) Colton Herta	Andretti Autosport w/ Curb-Agajanian	Honda	232.784	374.630
3	48	(Brazil) Tony Kanaan	Chip Ganassi Racing	Honda	232.690	374.478
OFFICIAL REPORT

== Time Trials ==
=== Qualifying — Saturday, May 22 ===
- Weather: 83 °F (28 °C), Overcast early, partly cloudy late
- Summary: Time trials on Saturday determined the top thirty qualifiers which would be locked into the starting field. The nine fastest cars advanced to the Fast Nine Shootout scheduled for Sunday to determine the pole position. The slowest five cars moved on to participate in the Last Row Shootout to determine the final row of the grid and which two entries would not qualify. Scott Dixon, the first driver to take the course, was the fastest driver, turning a four-lap average at 231.828 mph (373.091 km/h), with a best single lap speed of 232.574 mph (374.292 km/h). Colton Herta was second at 231.648 mph (372.801 km/h), while Dixon's teammate Tony Kanaan was third at 231.639 mph (372.787 km/h).

On his second qualifying attempt, Álex Palou suffered a crash in turn 2 after losing control and sliding into the wall at corner exit. However, Palou had not withdrawn his previous time to make this attempt, and his initial time was still fast enough to make the Fast Nine session the next day.

One of the major stories of the day was the difficulties for 2018 winner Will Power. Power was bumped from the field after his initial run and was unable to bump his way back in on subsequent runs, relegating him to the Last Row Shootout session. Sage Karam, Simona de Silvestro, Charlie Kimball, and R. C. Enerson were also forced into the Last Row Shootout.

Honda-powered cars were once again dominant in qualifications, taking eleven of the top 15 positions and seven of the Fast Nine spots. Pietro Fittipaldi, who qualified 13th, earned the Fastest Rookie Qualifier award.

Pos	No.	Driver	Team	Engine	Speed (mph)	Speed (km/h)
Fast Nine Qualifiers
1	9	(New Zealand) Scott Dixon W	Chip Ganassi Racing	Honda	231.828	373.091
2	26	(United States) Colton Herta	Andretti Autosport w/ Curb-Agajanian	Honda	231.648	372.801
3	48	(Brazil) Tony Kanaan W	Chip Ganassi Racing	Honda	231.639	372.787
4	20	(United States) Ed Carpenter	Ed Carpenter Racing	Chevrolet	231.616	372.750
5	21	(Netherlands) Rinus VeeKay	Ed Carpenter Racing	Chevrolet	231.483	372.536
6	06	(Brazil) Hélio Castroneves W	Meyer Shank Racing	Honda	231.164	372.022
7	10	(Spain) Álex Palou	Chip Ganassi Racing	Honda	231.145	371.992
8	28	(United States) Ryan Hunter-Reay W	Andretti Autosport	Honda	231.139	371.982
9	8	(Sweden) Marcus Ericsson	Chip Ganassi Racing	Honda	231.104	371.926
Positions 10–30
10	27	(United States) Alexander Rossi W	Andretti Autosport	Honda	231.046	371.832
11	18	(United Arab Emirates) Ed Jones	Dale Coyne Racing w/ Vasser-Sullivan	Honda	231.044	371.829
12	5	(Mexico) Patricio O'Ward	Arrow McLaren SP	Chevrolet	230.864	371.540
13	51	(Brazil) Pietro Fittipaldi R	Dale Coyne Racing w/ Rick Ware Racing	Honda	230.846	371.511
14	7	(Sweden) Felix Rosenqvist	Arrow McLaren SP	Chevrolet	230.744	371.346
15	30	(Japan) Takuma Sato W	Rahal Letterman Lanigan Racing	Honda	230.708	371.289
16	29	(Canada) James Hinchcliffe	Andretti Steinbrenner Autosport	Honda	230.563	371.055
17	3	(New Zealand) Scott McLaughlin R	Team Penske	Chevrolet	230.557	371.046
18	15	(United States) Graham Rahal	Rahal Letterman Lanigan Racing	Honda	230.521	370.988
19	47	(United States) Conor Daly	Ed Carpenter Racing	Chevrolet	230.427	370.836
20	60	(United Kingdom) Jack Harvey	Meyer Shank Racing	Honda	230.191	370.457
21	2	(United States) Josef Newgarden	Team Penske	Chevrolet	230.071	370.263
22	1	(United States) J. R. Hildebrand	A. J. Foyt Enterprises	Chevrolet	229.980	370.117
23	45	(United States) Santino Ferrucci	Rahal Letterman Lanigan Racing	Honda	229.949	370.067
24	86	(Colombia) Juan Pablo Montoya W	Arrow McLaren SP	Chevrolet	229.891	369.974
25	98	(United States) Marco Andretti	Andretti Herta-Haupert Autosport w/ Marco Andretti & Curb-Agajanian	Honda	229.872	369.943
26	22	(France) Simon Pagenaud W	Team Penske	Chevrolet	229.778	369.792
27	14	(France) Sébastien Bourdais	A. J. Foyt Enterprises	Chevrolet	229.744	369.737
28	25	(United Kingdom) Stefan Wilson	Andretti Autosport	Honda	229.714	369.689
29	59	(United Kingdom) Max Chilton	Carlin	Chevrolet	229.417	369.211
30	4	(Canada) Dalton Kellett	A. J. Foyt Enterprises	Chevrolet	228.323	367.450
Last Row Shootout
31	12	(Australia) Will Power W	Team Penske	Chevrolet	No time	
32	24	(United States) Sage Karam	Dreyer & Reinbold Racing	Chevrolet	No time	
33	11	(United States) Charlie Kimball	A. J. Foyt Enterprises	Chevrolet	No time	
34	16	(Switzerland) Simona de Silvestro	Paretta Autosport	Chevrolet	No time	
35	75	(United States) R. C. Enerson R	Top Gun Racing	Chevrolet	No time	
Official Report

=== Bump Day/Pole Day — Sunday, May 23 ===
- Weather: 83 °F (28 °C), Sunny early, mostly cloudy late

==== Last Chance Qualifying ====
Last Chance Qualifying began at 1:15 p.m. The format was expanded to a 75-minute session, with each participant having one guaranteed attempt. Previously, the Last Row Shootout session was limited to only one attempt per car. Entries were now allowed to make additional attempts, time-permitting, but were required to withdraw their previous time to do so. In addition, cars that had completed an attempt would have the time voided if they performed any subsequent work on the car before time ran out in the session. If any adjustments were made, or if any engine cooling efforts were performed, the car was automatically withdrawn and was required to make a new attempt.

Sage Karam was the fastest of those in the Last Row Shootout, turning a four-lap average at 229.156 mph (368.791 km/h), to secure 31st starting position. Despite brushing the wall in turn two on his final lap, Will Power was second fastest, taking 32nd. Simona de Silvestro was third fastest, giving her the final starting position (33rd) for the race. Charlie Kimball and R. C. Enerson were 4th-fastest and 5th-fastest, respectively. Despite multiple attempts each, Kimball and Enerson failed to qualify.

Pos	No.	Driver	Team	Engine	Speed (mph)	Speed (km/h)
Last Row Qualifiers
31	24	(United States) Sage Karam	Dreyer & Reinbold Racing	Chevrolet	229.156	368.791
32	12	(Australia) Will Power W	Team Penske	Chevrolet	228.876	368.340
33	16	(Switzerland) Simona de Silvestro	Paretta Autosport	Chevrolet	228.353	367.499
Failed to qualify
34	11	(United States) Charlie Kimball	A. J. Foyt Enterprises	Chevrolet	227.584	366.261
35	75	(United States) R. C. Enerson R	Top Gun Racing	Chevrolet	226.813	365.020
Official Report

==== Fast Nine Qualifying ====
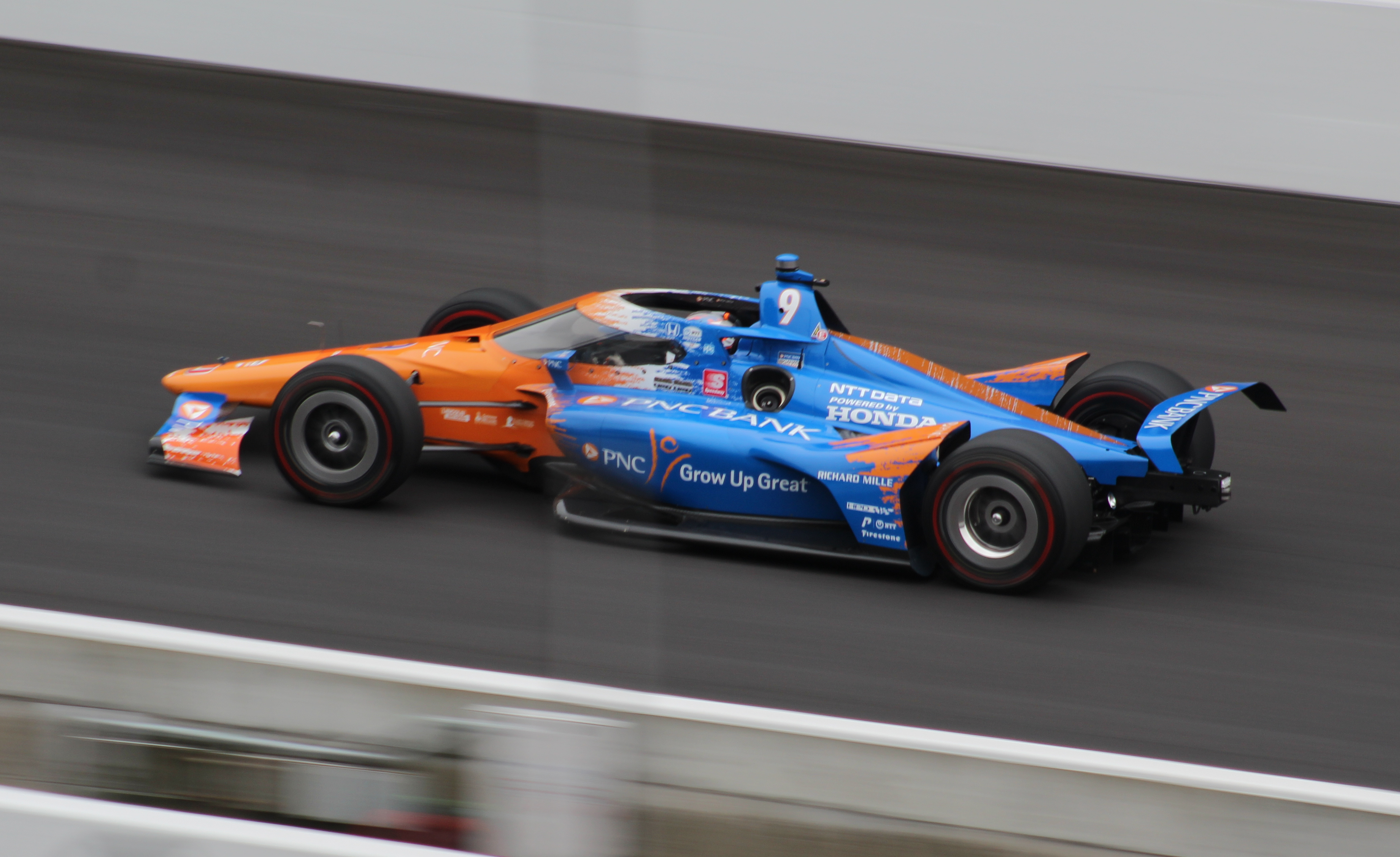
Scott Dixon, the polesitter

Scott Dixon won his fourth Indianapolis 500 pole position with a four-lap average of 231.685 mph (372.861 km/h) and a fastest single lap of 232.757 mph (374.586 km/h). It was Dixon's first IndyCar pole position since the 2017 race. Colton Herta qualified second at 231.655 mph (372.813 km/h), only 0.0197 seconds slower than Dixon. Rinus VeeKay improved from his fifth-placed result in Saturday qualifying to take the outside of the front row, running at 231.511 mph (372.581 km/h). VeeKay was also the highest qualified Chevrolet-powered entry in the field.

Following the conclusion of qualifications, a two-hour practice session was held.

Pos	No.	Driver	Team	Engine	Speed (mph)	Speed (km/h)
Fast Nine Qualifiers
1	9	(New Zealand) Scott Dixon W	Chip Ganassi Racing	Honda	231.685	372.861
2	26	(United States) Colton Herta	Andretti Autosport w/ Curb-Agajanian	Honda	231.655	372.813
3	21	(Netherlands) Rinus VeeKay	Ed Carpenter Racing	Chevrolet	231.511	372.581
4	20	(United States) Ed Carpenter	Ed Carpenter Racing	Chevrolet	231.504	372.570
5	48	(Brazil) Tony Kanaan W	Chip Ganassi Racing	Honda	231.032	371.810
6	10	(Spain) Álex Palou	Chip Ganassi Racing	Honda	230.616	371.140
7	28	(United States) Ryan Hunter-Reay W	Andretti Autosport	Honda	230.499	370.952
8	06	(Brazil) Hélio Castroneves W	Meyer Shank Racing	Honda	230.355	370.720
9	8	(Sweden) Marcus Ericsson	Chip Ganassi Racing	Honda	230.318	370.661
Official Report

== Post-Qualifying practice ==
=== Post-qualifying practice — Sunday, May 23 ===
- Weather: 83 °F (28 °C), mostly cloudy
- Summary: A two-hour practice session began at 5:00 p.m. following the conclusion of qualifications. Cars returned to their race-day boost levels, and practice runs were oriented on race set-ups. Simon Pagenaud suffered an engine failure during the session, the most significant incident of practice. Álex Palou turned the fastest lap, running at 225.649 mph (363.147 km/h).

Top Practice Speeds
Pos	No.	Driver	Team	Engine	Speed (mph)	Speed (km/h)
1	10	(Spain) Álex Palou	Chip Ganassi Racing	Honda	225.649	363.147
2	8	(Sweden) Marcus Ericsson	Chip Ganassi Racing	Honda	225.632	363.120
3	47	(United States) Conor Daly	Ed Carpenter Racing	Chevrolet	225.453	362.831
OFFICIAL REPORT

== Carb Day final practice ==
=== Carb Day — Friday, May 28 ===
- Weather: 60 °F (16 °C), intermittent rain showers
- Summary: Carb Day practice, the final practice before the race, was scheduled to begin at 11:00 a.m. However, rain showers delayed the start by over 2 hours, with practice not starting until roughly 1:30 p.m. Lower temperatures led to higher speeds for the drivers. Scott Dixon turned the fastest lap of the day at 228.323 mph (367.450 km/h). The session was cut short by roughly 10 minutes due to further rain showers.

Due to limited attendance caused by the COVID-19 pandemic, the annual Pit Stop Challenge and concerts were not held.

Top Practice Speeds
Pos	No.	Driver	Team	Engine	Speed (mph)	Speed (km/h)
1	9	(New Zealand) Scott Dixon	Chip Ganassi Racing	Honda	228.323	367.450
2	22	(France) Simon Pagenaud	Team Penske	Chevrolet	227.157	365.574
3	2	(United States) Josef Newgarden	Team Penske	Chevrolet	226.856	365.089
OFFICIAL REPORT

== Starting grid ==
Row	Inside		Middle		Outside	
1	9	(New Zealand) Scott Dixon W	26	(United States) Colton Herta	21	(Netherlands) Rinus VeeKay
2	20	(United States) Ed Carpenter	48	(Brazil) Tony Kanaan W	10	(Spain) Álex Palou
3	28	(United States) Ryan Hunter-Reay W	06	(Brazil) Hélio Castroneves W	8	(Sweden) Marcus Ericsson
4	27	(United States) Alexander Rossi W	18	(United Arab Emirates) Ed Jones	5	(Mexico) Patricio O'Ward
5	51	(Brazil) Pietro Fittipaldi R	7	(Sweden) Felix Rosenqvist	30	(Japan) Takuma Sato W
6	29	(Canada) James Hinchcliffe	3	(New Zealand) Scott McLaughlin R	15	(United States) Graham Rahal
7	47	(United States) Conor Daly	60	(United Kingdom) Jack Harvey	2	(United States) Josef Newgarden
8	1	(United States) J. R. Hildebrand	45	(United States) Santino Ferrucci	86	(Colombia) Juan Pablo Montoya W
9	98	(United States) Marco Andretti	22	(France) Simon Pagenaud W	14	(France) Sébastien Bourdais
10	25	(United Kingdom) Stefan Wilson	59	(United Kingdom) Max Chilton	4	(Canada) Dalton Kellett
11	24	(United States) Sage Karam	12	(Australia) Will Power W	16	(Switzerland) Simona de Silvestro

Failed to qualify

No.	Driver	Team	Reason
11	(United States) Charlie Kimball	A. J. Foyt Enterprises	Fourth fastest in Last Row Shootout. Too slow on second attempt.
75	(United States) R. C. Enerson R	Top Gun Racing	Fifth fastest in Last Row Shootout. Too slow on second attempt.

R Indianapolis 500 rookie
W Indianapolis 500 winner

== Race report ==
- Weather: 67 °F (19 °C), Sunny.

=== First half ===
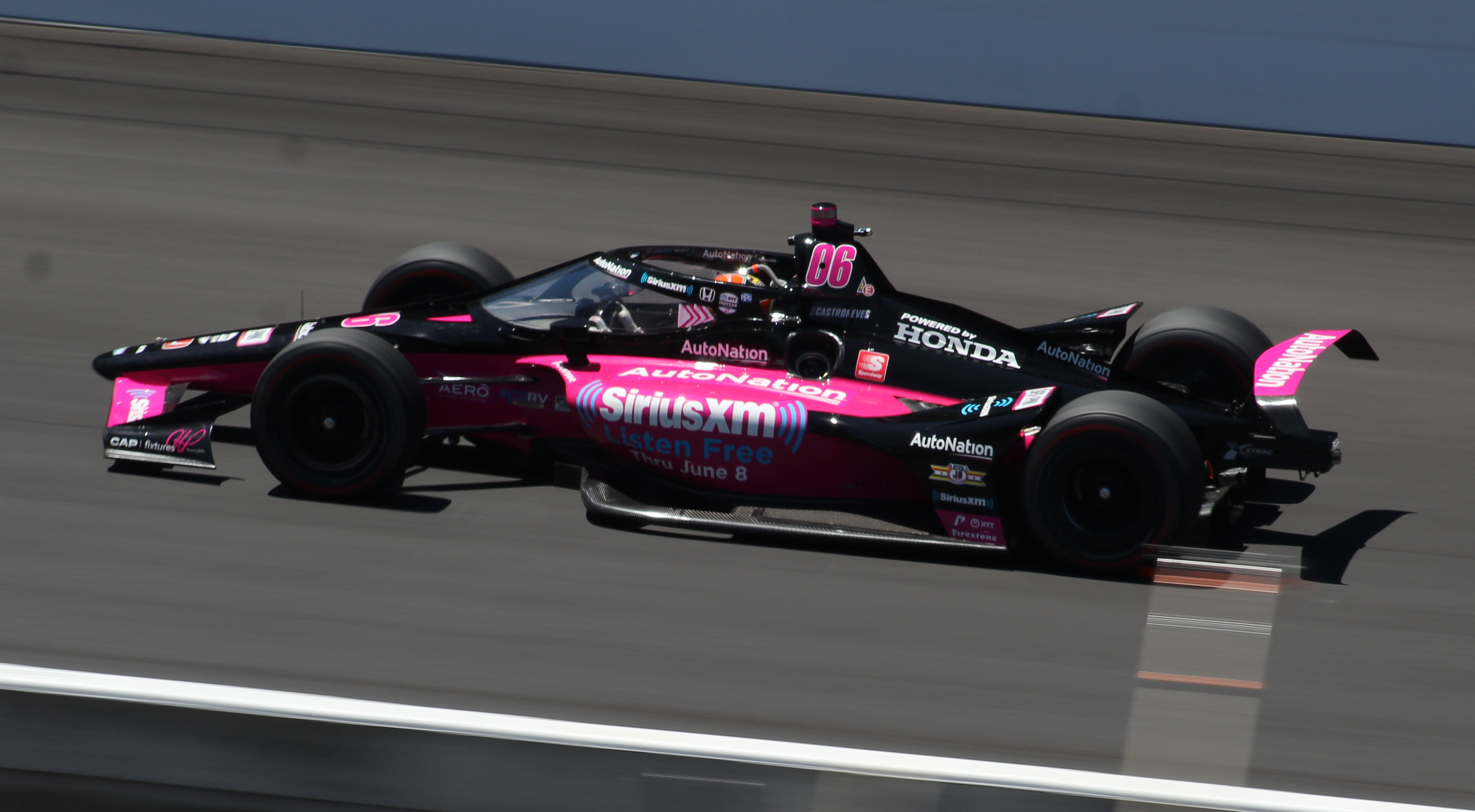
Race winner Hélio Castroneves

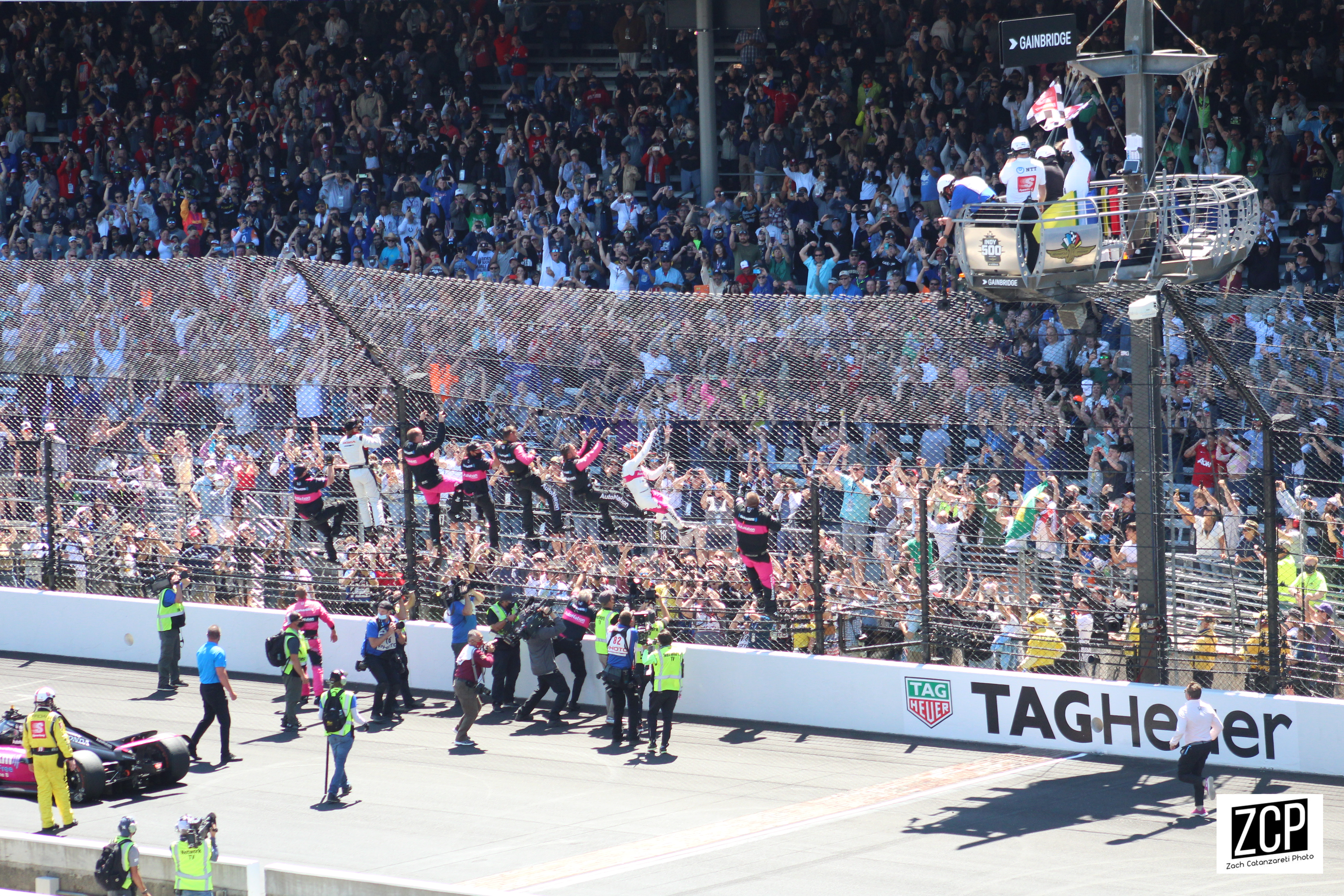
Castroneves celebrating with his crew by climbing the safety fencing

Ed Carpenter Racing teammates Conor Daly and Rinus VeeKay dominated the first half of the race. The race began with Scott Dixon pulling into the lead, but by the end of the first lap, Colton Herta had overtaken him. On lap 2, VeeKay moved into the lead and kept it for 29 laps. The lead cars remained in roughly the same order until the first round of pit stops began around lap 31. Ed Carpenter lost significant time when his car fell off its air-jacks and then stalled, dropping him down the order. In the midst of this pit sequence, Stefan Wilson lost his control of his car and wrecked entering pit lane, triggering the race's first caution period. The timing of the caution period caused several participants to make emergency service stops. The worst affected were pre-race favorites Dixon and Alexander Rossi, who both ran out of fuel entering pit lane. Both drivers fell off the lead lap trying to get the cars refired as a consequence. Due to the number of cars taking penalties for stopping for emergency service, the caution period lasted 11 laps while IndyCar officials determined the running order.

Racing resumed at lap 46, with Herta, VeeKay, and Daly as the top 3. After a few laps of racing, VeeKay moved into the lead briefly before being passed by his teammate Daly. Hélio Castroneves ran fourth. The next round of pit stops began at roughly lap 68, with no major incident. Daly and VeeKay retained their lead positions, while Patricio O'Ward moved into third. A slower stop dropped Castroneves to seventh. At the halfway mark of the race, the running order was Daly, VeeKay, O'Ward, Ryan Hunter-Reay, and Herta.

=== Second half ===
Another round of pit stops came around lap 103. Differing fuel strategies meant that several drivers extended farther, going as far as lap 118. Graham Rahal pitted at lap 118 from the lead, but was released without the left rear tire secured. As Rahal exited the pits, the tire came off of the car and sent Rahal spinning into the turn 2 wall, triggering the race's second caution period. As cars scrambled to avoid the debris from Rahal's wrecked car, Conor Daly struck the loose tire, damaging his front wing. The team elected not to repair the damage, but Daly never reclaimed the lead for the remainder of the race. After a reshuffling of positions from pit stops and the caution, Álex Palou now held the lead ahead of Hélio Castroneves, Patricio O'Ward, and Rinus VeeKay.

Racing resumed at lap 125, with the top 3 drivers exchanging the lead for several laps before settling back into their original order. More pit stops came at roughly lap 144, with the lead cars avoiding incident. Further back, Will Power spun his car trying to slow down for pit entry, causing him to fall off the lead lap. The running order remained Palou, Castroneves, and O'Ward, with Ryan Hunter-Reay moving up to fourth.

The final round of pit stops came at around lap 170. Castroneves came out ahead of Palou initially, but was quickly passed on track. Hunter-Reay's top-5 run came to an end after failing to slow in time for pit entry, resulting in a penalty. Further back, Simona de Silvestro spun and damaged her car entering pit lane, forcing her to retire from the race.

=== Finish ===
While the leaders had pitted for the final time, Felix Rosenqvist and Takuma Sato stayed out, hoping to get another caution period and allow them to reach the end of the race without making another pit stop. The caution never came, and both drivers were forced to pit for fuel after lap 190. This left Palou and Castroneves with the lead positions in the closing stages of the race. With two laps remaining, Castroneves overtook Palou to take the lead. Despite encountering a large pack of backmarkers on the final lap, Castroneves held off Palou to take victory. For Castroneves, it was his fourth Indianapolis 500 victory, equaling the record for most victories set by A. J. Foyt, Al Unser, and Rick Mears. He also became the fourth driver aged 46 or older to win the race. The 12-year gap between Castroneves' fourth win and his third win in 2009 is the second-longest gap between victories in Indianapolis 500 history, only after Juan Pablo Montoya's 15-year gap between victories in 2000 and 2015. It was also the first ever IndyCar race victory for the Meyer Shank Racing team. For his victory, Castroneves received $1,828,305 from a total purse of $8,854,565. Palou, the second-place finisher, took over the series points lead with his result. Simon Pagenaud took third position after climbing from a 26th place starting position. Patricio O'Ward and Ed Carpenter rounded out the top 5. Scott McLaughlin was the higher finishing of the two rookies in the race despite a pit lane penalty, netting him Rookie of the Year honors.

With an average speed of 190.690 mph (306.886 km/h), the 2021 race set a new record for the fastest running of the Indianapolis 500, eclipsing the mark set in the 2013 race by over 3 mph. The race was noted for its competitive parity, with 361 overtakes made, including 35 for the lead between 13 different drivers. The race further set a record for most competitors still running at the finish, with 30 of the initial 33 starters still circulating.

== Box score ==
Finish	No.	Driver	Team	Chassis	Engine	Laps	Status	Pit Stops	Grid	Pts.^{1}
1	06	(Brazil) Hélio Castroneves W	Meyer Shank Racing	Dallara UAK18	Honda	200	190.690 mph	5	8	103
2	10	(Spain) Álex Palou	Chip Ganassi Racing	Dallara UAK18	Honda	200	+0.4928	5	6	85
3	22	(France) Simon Pagenaud W	Team Penske	Dallara UAK18	Chevrolet	200	+0.5626	6	26	71
4	5	(Mexico) Patricio O'Ward	Arrow McLaren SP	Dallara UAK18	Chevrolet	200	+0.9409	5	12	65
5	20	(United States) Ed Carpenter	Ed Carpenter Racing	Dallara UAK18	Chevrolet	200	+1.2424	5	4	66
6	45	(United States) Santino Ferrucci	Rahal Letterman Lanigan Racing	Dallara UAK18	Honda	200	+9.0876	6	23	57
7	24	(United States) Sage Karam	Dreyer & Reinbold Racing	Dallara UAK18	Chevrolet	200	+13.4359	5	31	53
8	21	(Netherlands) Rinus VeeKay	Ed Carpenter Racing	Dallara UAK18	Chevrolet	200	+14.2415	5	3	56
9	86	(Colombia) Juan Pablo Montoya W	Arrow McLaren SP	Dallara UAK18	Chevrolet	200	+14.8808	5	24	44
10	48	(Brazil) Tony Kanaan W	Chip Ganassi Racing	Dallara UAK18	Honda	200	+15.4428	7	5	45
11	8	(Sweden) Marcus Ericsson	Chip Ganassi Racing	Dallara UAK18	Honda	200	+16.5166	6	9	39
12	2	(United States) Josef Newgarden	Team Penske	Dallara UAK18	Chevrolet	200	+22.3045	5	21	36
13	47	(United States) Conor Daly	Ed Carpenter Racing	Dallara UAK18	Chevrolet	200	+22.6921	5	19	37
14	30	(Japan) Takuma Sato W	Rahal Letterman Lanigan Racing	Dallara UAK18	Honda	200	+23.2955	5	15	33
15	1	(United States) J. R. Hildebrand	A. J. Foyt Enterprises	Dallara UAK18	Chevrolet	200	+23.5277	7	22	30
16	26	(United States) Colton Herta	Andretti Autosport w/ Curb-Agajanian	Dallara UAK18	Honda	200	+28.8029	5	2	37
17	9	(New Zealand) Scott Dixon W	Chip Ganassi Racing	Dallara UAK18	Honda	200	+38.6410	6	1	36
18	60	(United Kingdom) Jack Harvey	Meyer Shank Racing	Dallara UAK18	Honda	200	+40.1572	6	20	24
19	98	(United States) Marco Andretti	Andretti Herta-Haupert Autosport w/ Marco Andretti & Curb-Agajanian	Dallara UAK18	Honda	200	+40.3591	6	25	22
20	3	(New Zealand) Scott McLaughlin R	Team Penske	Dallara UAK18	Chevrolet	200	+40.8337	8	17	20
21	29	(Canada) James Hinchcliffe	Andretti Steinbrenner Autosport	Dallara UAK18	Honda	200	+40.8464	5	16	18
22	28	(United States) Ryan Hunter-Reay W	Andretti Autosport	Dallara UAK18	Honda	200	+41.5762	6	7	19
23	4	(Canada) Dalton Kellett	A. J. Foyt Enterprises	Dallara UAK18	Chevrolet	199	-1 Lap	6	30	14
24	59	(United Kingdom) Max Chilton	Carlin	Dallara UAK18	Chevrolet	199	-1 Lap	8	29	12
25	51	(Brazil) Pietro Fittipaldi R	Dale Coyne Racing w/ Rick Ware Racing	Dallara UAK18	Honda	199	-1 Lap	6	13	10
26	14	(France) Sébastien Bourdais	A. J. Foyt Enterprises	Dallara UAK18	Chevrolet	199	-1 Lap	6	27	10
27	7	(Sweden) Felix Rosenqvist	Arrow McLaren SP	Dallara UAK18	Chevrolet	199	-1 Lap	8	14	11
28	18	(United Arab Emirates) Ed Jones	Dale Coyne Racing w/ Vasser-Sullivan	Dallara UAK18	Honda	199	-1 Lap	6	11	10
29	27	(United States) Alexander Rossi W	Andretti Autosport	Dallara UAK18	Honda	198	-2 Laps	10	10	10
30	12	(Australia) Will Power W	Team Penske	Dallara UAK18	Chevrolet	197	-3 Laps	6	32	10
31	16	(Switzerland) Simona de Silvestro	Paretta Autosport	Dallara UAK18	Chevrolet	169	Contact	4	33	10
32	15	(United States) Graham Rahal	Rahal Letterman Lanigan Racing	Dallara UAK18	Honda	118	Contact	3	18	11
33	25	(United Kingdom) Stefan Wilson	Andretti Autosport	Dallara UAK18	Honda	32	Contact	1	28	10
OFFICIAL REPORT

W Former Indianapolis 500 winner

R Indianapolis 500 Rookie

All entrants utilized Firestone tires.

^{1} Points include qualification points from time trials, 1 point for leading a lap, and 2 points for most laps led.

=== Race statistics ===
Lap Leaders
Laps	Leader
1	Colton Herta
2–30	Rinus VeeKay
31–32	Colton Herta
33–35	Scott Dixon
36–38	Hélio Castroneves
39–48	Colton Herta
49	Rinus VeeKay
50–70	Conor Daly
71–76	Hélio Castroneves
77	Álex Palou
78	Pato O'Ward
79–81	Graham Rahal
82–83	Rinus VeeKay
84–102	Conor Daly
103–113	Pato O'Ward
114–118	Graham Rahal
119–124	Álex Palou
125–126	Hélio Castroneves
127–130	Pato O'Ward
131–147	Álex Palou
148–149	Hélio Castroneves
150	Pato O'Ward
151–156	Takuma Sato
157	Felix Rosenqvist
158–161	Scott Dixon
162–168	Álex Palou
169–171	Hélio Castroneves
172	Álex Palou
173–175	Simon Pagenaud
176–177	Sage Karam
178–179	Santino Ferrucci
180–192	Felix Rosenqvist
193	Takuma Sato
194–195	Hélio Castroneves
196–198	Álex Palou
199–200	Hélio Castroneves

Total laps led
Driver	Laps
Conor Daly	40
Álex Palou	35
Rinus VeeKay	32
Hélio Castroneves	20
Pato O'Ward	17
Felix Rosenqvist	14
Colton Herta	13
Graham Rahal	8
Scott Dixon	7
Takuma Sato	7
Simon Pagenaud	3
Sage Karam	2
Santino Ferrucci	2

Cautions: 2 for 18 laps
Laps	Reason
34–45	Stefan Wilson contact in pit lane
119–124	Graham Rahal crash in turn 2

== Broadcasting ==
=== Television ===
The race was televised on NBC in the United States. The coverage began at 11:00 a.m. EDT. On May 28, IMS announced that the traditional blackout of the race in the Indianapolis media market would be lifted for the third time since live flag-to-flag coverage began in 1986, as all tickets had been sold out. Therefore, local NBC station WTHR carried the live telecast.

Mike Tirico and Danica Patrick returned for pre and post-race coverage, as they had done the previous two years. Patrick also drove the pace car during pre-race festivities. Jac Collinsworth made his Indy 500 debut as the Prerace Host on NBCSN. Dale Earnhardt Jr. returned for pre-race coverage after being absent for the 2020 event as a result of rescheduling (Earnhardt and Letarte were covering the Drydene Twin 500km at Dover International Speedway on the rescheduled weekend).

On May 4, Jimmie Johnson was announced as part of the broadcast team as part of the "Peacock Pit Box" crew alongside Steve Letarte.

The 2021 race was the final "500" for Robin Miller, who had covered the event for roughly fifty years at The Indianapolis Star, Racer, and on television through ESPN, Speed, and NBC. Miller died of leukemia on August 25, 2021.

NBC
Booth Announcers	Pre/Post-Race	Pit/garage reporters
Announcer: Leigh Diffey; Color: Townsend Bell; Color: Paul Tracy	NBC Host: Mike Tirico; Studio Analyst: Danica Patrick; NBCSN Host: Jac Collinsworth; Analyst/Features: Dale Earnhardt Jr. Features: Rutledge Wood	Marty Snider; Kelli Stavast; Dave Burns; Kevin Lee; Jimmie Johnson (pit box); Steve Letarte (pit box)

=== Radio ===
The race was carried by the IndyCar Radio Network. The chief announcer or "Voice of the 500" for the sixth consecutive year was Mark Jaynes with Davey Hamilton as driver analyst. Recently retired Donald Davidson returned to the booth in a live capacity for the first time since 2019 as in 2020 due to the COVID-19 pandemic all of his appearances were taped. This year marked the debut of Alex Wollf as an on-air pit reporter. It also marked the debut of Scott Sander as a pit reporter.

1070 The Fan broadcast weeknights with Trackside with Curt Cavin and Kevin Lee. Speedway historian Donald Davidson retired at the end of 2020, and his longtime program The Talk of Gasoline Alley was no longer aired. In its place, a new Indianapolis 500 themed program title Beyond The Bricks was hosted by Jake Query (an IndyCar Radio Network veteran) and former WIBC personality Mike Thomson.

The 2021 race was the final "500" for Bob Jenkins, the former radio, television, and public address announcer, and emcee. Jenkins died August 9, 2021, from brain cancer. Jenkins had worked as a reporter/broadcaster at the race every year from 1979 to 2020, and had attended the race nearly every since 1960. (Note: In multiple public interviews, Jenkins claimed he had attended the Indianapolis 500 every year from 1960 to 2020, except for 1961 and 1965.) Due to his condition, he attended the 2021 race only as a spectator, and sat for only brief pre-recorded pieces for the radio broadcast.

IndyCar Radio Network
Booth Announcers	Turn Reporters	Pit/garage reporters	Guest Commentary
Chief Announcer: Mark Jaynes; Driver expert: Davey Hamilton; Historian: Donald Davidson	Turn 1: Nick Yeoman; Turn 2: Michael Young; Turn 3: Jake Query; Turn 4: Chris Denari	Alex Wollf (north pits) R Scott Sander (north middle pits) R Rob Blackman (south middle pits); Ryan Myrehn (south pits)	Paul Page; Dave Wilson; Sam Rumpza; Mike Thomsen; Bob Jenkins

== Footnotes ==
Previous race: 2021 GMR Grand Prix	IndyCar Series; 2021 season	Next race: 2021 Chevrolet Detroit Grand Prix
Previous race: 2020 Indianapolis 500	Indianapolis 500	Next race: 2022 Indianapolis 500
Preceded by 187.433 mph (2013 Indianapolis 500)	Record for the Indianapolis 500 fastest average speed 190.690 mph	Succeeded by Incumbent
