= Eagle 68 =

- Category: USAC IndyCar
- Constructor: AAR
- Designer(s): Tony Southgate

Technical specifications
- Chassis: Aluminum monocoque
- Suspension (front): Double wishbones, coil springs over shock absorbers, anti-roll bar
- Suspension (rear): Lower wishbones, top links, twin trailing arms, coil springs over shock absorbers, anti-roll bar
- Wheelbase: 96.3 in (2,446 mm)
- Engine: Offenhauser 159 cu in (2.6 L) turbocharged DOHC I4 mid-engined, rear-wheel-drive
- Transmission: Hewland L.G.500 4-speed manual
- Weight: 1,380 lb (630 kg)
- Fuel: Methanol
- Brakes: Girling ventilated discs, 305mm (12 in) (fr/r)
- Tyres: Goodyear

Competition history
- Notable entrants: All American Racers
- Notable drivers: Dan Gurney (United States) Mark Donohue
- Debut: 1968 California 200
Wins	Poles
3	4

The Eagle 68 was an open-wheel race car developed and built by Dan Gurney's All American Racers team, designed to compete in USAC IndyCar racing, starting in the 1968 season.

The Eagle 68, developed in-house by Gurney’s All American Racers, made its debut in the 1968 USAC IndyCar season. It was a bold and innovative creation, designed specifically to tackle the demands of high-speed oval racing, as well as the unique technical challenges presented by IndyCar events. With a focus on aerodynamics and advanced engineering, the Eagle 68 represented a significant leap forward in open-wheel race car design.
