= Palmer Cord Tyres =

Former English tyre manufacturer

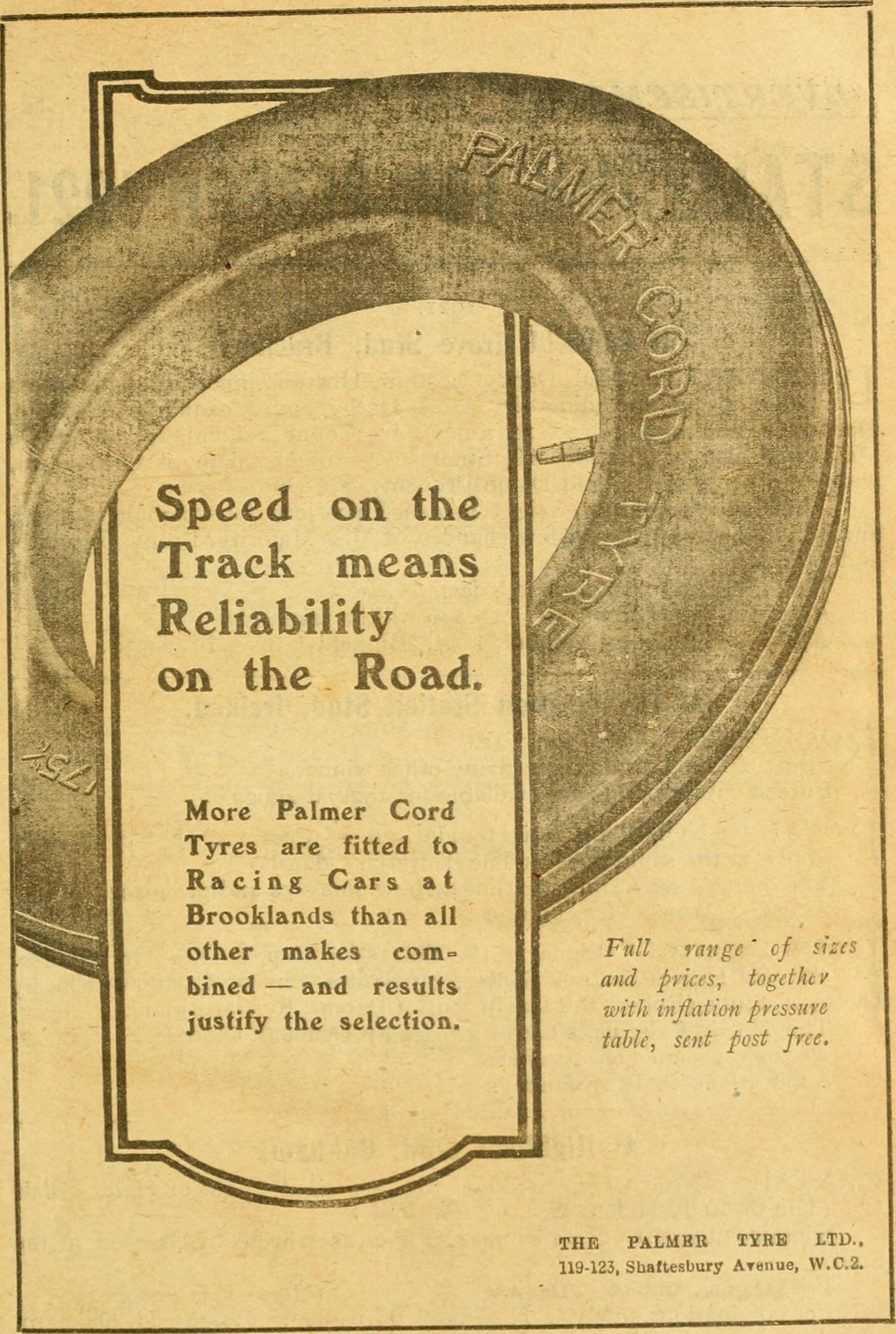
1920 advertisement

Palmer Cord Tyres was an English tyre manufacturer created in 1895. In 1914, René Thomas drove a Delage car to victory in the Indianapolis 500, wearing Palmer Cord tyres.
