= Lone Tree Cemetery =

Lone Tree Cemetery may refer to:

- Lone Tree Commonwealth War Graves Commission Cemetery, Ypres, Belgium
- Lone Tree Cemetery, Fairview, California
