= Bob Finney =

American racing driver (1920–1999)

- Born: Robert Neil Finney; July 1, 1920 Genoa, Colorado, U.S.
- Died: May 10, 1999 (aged 78) Colorado Springs, Colorado, U.S.

Championship titles
- 1955, 1957; Pikes Peak International Hill Climb Winner

Champ Car career
- 6 races run over 6 years
- Years active: 1951–1955
- Best finish: 21st (tie) – 1955
- First race: 1950 Pikes Peak Hill Climb (Pikes Peak)
- Last race: 1955 Pikes Peak Hill Climb (Pikes Peak)
- First win: 1955 Pikes Peak Hill Climb (Pikes Peak)
Wins	Podiums	Poles
1	2	1

Bob Finney (July 1, 1920 – May 10, 1999) was an American race car driver from Colorado Springs, Colorado. He won the Pikes Peak International Hill Climb in 1955, when he was part of the AAA Championship Car. Finney also won this race in 1957, but at that time he was no longer part of the USAC Championship. He has a total of six AAA Championship races between 1950 and 1955.

== Complete AAA Championship Car results ==
(key) (Races in bold indicate pole position)

Year	1	2	3	4	5	6	7	8	9	10	11	12	13	14	15	Rank	Points
1950	INDY	MIL	LAN	SPR	MIL	PIK; 15	SYR	DET	SPR	SAC	PHX	BAY	DAR			-	0
1951	INDY	MIL	LAN	DAR	SPR	MIL	DUQ	DUQ	PIK; 7	SYR	DET	DNC	SJS	PHX	BAY	42nd	60
1952	INDY	MIL	RAL	SPR	MIL	DET	DUQ	PIK; 19	SYR	DNC	SJS	PHX				-	0
1953	INDY	MIL	SPR	DET	SPR	MIL	DUQ	PIK; 4	SYR	ISF	SAC	PHX				31st	120
1954	INDY	MIL	LAN	DAR	SPR	MIL	DUQ	PIK; 3	SYR	ISF	SAC	PHX	LVG			31st	140
1955	INDY	MIL	LAN	SPR	MIL	DUQ	PIK; 1	SYR	ISF	SAC	PHX					21st	200
