= 1955 AAA Championship Car season =

Sports season

- AAA National Championship Trail

Season
- Races: 11
- Start date: May 30
- End date: November 6

Awards
- National champion: (United States) Bob Sweikert
- Indianapolis 500 winner: (United States) Bob Sweikert

The 1955 AAA Championship Car season consisted of 11 races, beginning in Speedway, Indiana on May 30 and concluding in Phoenix, Arizona on November 6. There was also one non-championship event in Mechanicsburg, Pennsylvania. The AAA National Champion and Indianapolis 500 winner was Bob Sweikert. Manny Ayulo was killed at Indianapolis while practicing for the 1955 Indianapolis 500, and Bill Vukovich, the two-time defending winner, was killed in the race itself. Jack McGrath, the two-time champion (1952, 1953), was killed in the final race at Phoenix on lap 85. This was the last year of the AAA National Championship; USAC sanctioned the series starting the next year.

== Schedule and results ==
Rnd	Date	Race name	Track	Location	Type	Pole position	Winning driver
1	May 30	(United States) International 500 Mile Sweepstakes^{A}	Indianapolis Motor Speedway	Speedway, Indiana	Paved	(United States) Jerry Hoyt	(United States) Bob Sweikert
2	June 5	(United States) Rex Mays Classic	Wisconsin State Fair Park Speedway	West Allis, Wisconsin	Paved	(United States) Bob Sweikert	(United States) Johnny Thomson
3	June 19	(United States) Langhorne 100	Langhorne Speedway	Langhorne, Pennsylvania	Dirt	(United States) Don Freeland	(United States) Jimmy Bryan
NC	July 31	(United States) Indianapolis Sweepstakes	Williams Grove Speedway	Mechanicsburg, Pennsylvania	Dirt	(United States) Ed Elisian	(United States) Jimmy Bryan
4	August 20	(United States) Springfield 100	Illinois State Fairgrounds	Springfield, Illinois	Dirt	(United States) Andy Linden	(United States) Jimmy Bryan
5	August 28	(United States) Milwaukee 250	Wisconsin State Fair Park Speedway	West Allis, Wisconsin	Paved	(United States) Ed Elisian	(United States) Pat Flaherty
6	September 5	(United States) Ted Horn Memorial 100	DuQuoin State Fairgrounds	Du Quoin, Illinois	Dirt	(United States) Eddie Russo	(United States) Jimmy Bryan
7	September 5	(United States) Pikes Peak Auto Hill Climb	Pikes Peak Highway	Pikes Peak, Colorado	Hill	(United States) Shelby Hill^{B}	(United States) Bob Finney
8	September 10	(United States) Syracuse 100	Syracuse Mile	Syracuse, New York	Dirt	(United States) Bob Sweikert	(United States) Bob Sweikert
9	September 17	(United States) Hoosier Hundred	Indiana State Fairgrounds	Indianapolis, Indiana	Dirt	(United States) Bob Sweikert	(United States) Jimmy Bryan
10	October 16	(United States) Golden State 100	California State Fairgrounds	Sacramento, California	Dirt	(United States) Bob Sweikert	(United States) Jimmy Bryan
11	November 6	(United States) Bobby Ball Memorial	Arizona State Fairgrounds	Phoenix, Arizona	Dirt	(United States) Jimmy Reece	(United States) Jimmy Bryan

Paved/Dirt Oval
Road Course/Hill Climb
Non-championship race

^A Indianapolis 500 was USAC-sanctioned and counted towards the 1955 FIA World Championship of Drivers title.
^B No pole is awarded for the Pikes Peak Hill Climb, in this schedule on the pole is the driver who started first. No lap led was awarded for the Pikes Peak Hill Climb, however, a lap was awarded to the drivers that completed the climb.

== Final points standings ==
Note: The points became the car, when not only one driver led the car, the relieved driver became small part of the points. Points for driver method: (the points for the finish place) / (number the lap when completed the car) * (number the lap when completed the driver)

Pos	Driver	INDY (United States)	MIL1 (United States)	LHS (United States)	SPR (United States)	MIL2 (United States)	DQSF (United States)	PIK (United States)	SYR (United States)	ISF (United States)	CSF (United States)	ASF (United States)	Pts
1	(United States) Bob Sweikert	1	**2**	2	2	3	4		**1**	**17**	**3**	18	2290
2	(United States) Jimmy Bryan	24	4	1	1	23	1		2	1	1	1	1480
3	(United States) Johnny Thomson	4	1	15					5	2	2	2	1380
4	(United States) Tony Bettenhausen	2	DNQ		DNQ	2	DNQ		Wth	4		9	1060
5	(United States) Andy Linden	6	6	DNQ	**3**	7	6		DNS	9	4	4	1047.8
6	(United States) Jimmy Davies	3	5	DNQ	9	13	14		8	DNQ	DNQ	DNQ	890
7	(United States) Pat O'Connor	8	18	5	DNQ	26	9		4	5	5	5	800
8	(United States) Pat Flaherty	10	3			1				DNQ			790
9	(United States) George Amick RY		7	18	4	20	3		3	3	12	3	750
10	(United States) Walt Faulkner	5	21		16	DNQ			DNS	DNS			447.5
11	(United States) Al Herman R	7	10	8	DNQ	22							380
12	(United States) Bob Veith R				DNQ	8	5		6	13		8	355
13	(United States) Johnny Boyd	29			DNQ	5	8		16	DNQ	8		350
14	(United States) Don Freeland	15	12	**3**		12	18		13	6	6	16	315.2
15	(United States) Art Cross	17				4							300
16	(United States) Paul Russo	DNS											300
17	(United States) Rodger Ward	28	DNQ	9	DNQ	24	DNQ		9	14		6	252.2
18	(United States) Jack McGrath	26	8		10	21	2		17	15	18	13	240
19	(United States) Jimmy Daywalt	9	14			18	13		11	DNQ		DNS	226.4
20	(United States) Mike Magill R		13	4	7		10		18	16			210
21	(United States) Bob Finney							1					200
22	(United States) Tony Bonadies R	DNQ	DNQ	DNQ		6			DNQ				200
23	(United States) Jimmy Reece	33	9	14	8	14	DNQ		10	8	16	**12**	180
24	(United States) Eddie Russo	22	DNQ	7	13	10	**12**		DNQ	11			165
25	(United States) Slim Roberts							2					160
26	(United States) Ed Elisian	30	DNQ	6	18	**25**	DNQ		DNQ	7	11		160
27	(United States) Louis Unser R							3					140
28	(United States) Jerry Unser R							4	DNQ	DNQ	DNQ		120
29	(United States) Duane Carter	11	DNQ	10	14		DNQ						112.9
30	(United States) Johnnie Tolan	Wth	DNQ	DNQ	11	19	DNQ		DNQ	DNQ	10	7	110
31	(United States) Jiggs Peters	DNQ	16	DNQ	5	DNS			DNS	DNQ			100
32	(United States) Bobby Unser R							5					100
33	(United States) Tommy Hinnershitz			11	6		DNQ		DNS				100
34	(United States) Johnny Kay R	DNQ			DNQ	16	DNQ		7	10			90
35	(United States) Keith Andrews	20						6			15	DNQ	80
36	(United States) Edgar Elder			DNQ	12	DNQ	7		12	DNQ	13	15	80
37	(United States) Elmer George R	DNQ									7	DNQ	60
38	(United States) Charles Louderman							7					60
39	(United States) Johnnie Parsons	21				9	DNQ		DNQ				53.2
40	(United States) Bill Homeier	DNS	DNQ	DNQ	17	DNS	DNQ		DNQ	DNQ	DNQ		52.5
41	(United States) Pete Woods							8					50
42	(United States) Shorty Templeman	18	11	DNQ	DNQ	17	15			DNQ	DNQ	10	50
43	(United States) Gene Hartley	DNQ	19	DNQ	DNQ	11	DNQ			DNQ			50
44	(United States) Chuck Weyant	12	DNP		DNQ	DNQ	DNQ		DNQ	DNQ			50
45	(United States) Eddie Sachs					DNS				DNQ		DNQ	46.8
46	(United States) Mel McGaughy R										9	DNQ	40
47	(United States) Paul Kleinschmidt							9					40
48	(United States) Jack Turner R		DNQ	13	DNQ	DNS	DNQ		DNQ	DNQ		11	33.4
49	(United States) George Hammond							10					30
50	(United States) Buddy Cagle R						11		DNQ	DNQ		14	20
51	(United States) Louis Unser							11					20
52	(United States) Len Duncan	DNQ	DNQ	DNS									17.1
53	(United States) Eddie Johnson	13			15	DNQ	16		14	12			10
54	(United States) Charles Musselman R			12					DNQ				10
55	(United States) E. T. Cox R							12					10
-	(United States) Foster Campbell R							13			DNQ	DNQ	0
-	(United States) Earl Motter R		DNQ						15	18	14	DNQ	0
-	(United States) Jim Rathmann	14	20										0
-	(United States) Art Hillis							14					0
-	(United States) Al Keller	27	15	17									0
-	(United States) Rex Easton		17		DNQ	15				DNQ	DNQ		0
-	(United States) Shelby Hill							**15**					0
-	(United States) Jerry Hoyt	**31**	22	16									0
-	(United States) Cal Niday	16											0
-	(United States) Jimmy Good							16					0
-	(United States) Len Sutton R										17	17	0
-	(United States) Bob Carroll						17			DNQ	DNQ		0
-	(United States) Ted Foltz							17					0
-	(United States) Wayne Sankey							18					0
-	(United States) Sam Hanks	19										DNQ	0
-	(United States) Jack Hahn R							19					0
-	(United States) Dan Morgan R							20					0
-	(United States) Ray Crawford	23	DNQ		DNQ	DNQ				DNQ	DNQ	DNQ	0
-	(United States) Bill Vukovich	25											0
-	(United States) Fred Agabashian	32											0
-	(United States) Potsy Goacher			DNS	DNQ								0
-	(United States) Joe Sostilio		DNQ	DNQ			DNQ		DNQ				0
-	(United States) Russ Klar	DNQ					DNQ		DNQ				0
-	(United States) Ernie McCoy	DNQ		DNQ									0
-	(United States) Leroy Warriner	DNQ								DNQ			0
-	(United States) George Tichenor	DNQ	DNP										0
-	(United States) Manny Ayulo	DNQ											0
-	(United States) Bob Christie	DNQ											0
-	(United States) Danny Kladis	DNQ											0
-	(United States) George Lynch	DNQ											0
-	(United States) Troy Ruttman	DNQ											0
-	(United States) Spider Webb	DNQ											0
-	(United States) Howard Kelley				DNQ								0
-	(United States) Colby Scroggin				DNQ								0
-	(United States) Malcolm Brazier							DNQ					0
-	(United States) Joe Garson							DNQ					0
-	(United States) L. J. Green							DNQ					0
-	(United States) Berton Groves							DNQ					0
-	(United States) Gordon Herring							DNQ					0
-	(United States) Johnny Mauro							DNQ					0
-	(United States) T. E. Russell							DNQ					0
-	(United States) Phil Shafer							DNQ					0
-	(United States) Tom Topping							DNQ					0
-	(United States) Chuck Fink										DNQ		0
Pos	Driver	INDY (United States)	MIL1 (United States)	LHS (United States)	SPR (United States)	MIL2 (United States)	DQSF (United States)	PIK (United States)	SYR (United States)	ISF (United States)	CSF (United States)	ASF (United States)	Pts

Color	Result
Gold	Winner
Silver	2nd place
Bronze	3rd place
Green	4th & 5th place
Light Blue	6th-10th place
Dark Blue	Finished (Outside Top 10)
Purple	Did not finish (Ret)
Red	Did not qualify (DNQ)
Brown	Withdrawn (Wth)
Black	Disqualified (DSQ)
White	Did not start (DNS)
Blank	Did not participate (DNP)
Blank	Not competing

**In-line notation**
**Bold**	Pole position
Italics	Ran fastest race lap
*	Led most race laps
RY Rookie of the Year
R Rookie

== General references ==
- Åberg, Andreas. "AAA National Championship 1955". Driver Database. Archived from the original on September 8, 2012.
- "1955 AAA National Championship Trail". ChampCarStats.com. Archived from the original on August 27, 2008.
- Harms, Phil. "1955 Championship Driver Summary" (PDF). Motorsport.com. Archived from the original (PDF) on August 10, 2012.
- http://media.indycar.com/pdf/2011/IICS_2011_Historical_Record_Book_INT6.pdf (p. 284-286)

== See also ==
- 1955 Indianapolis 500
