= Fairview, California =

Unincorporated community in California, United States

Fairview
- CDP
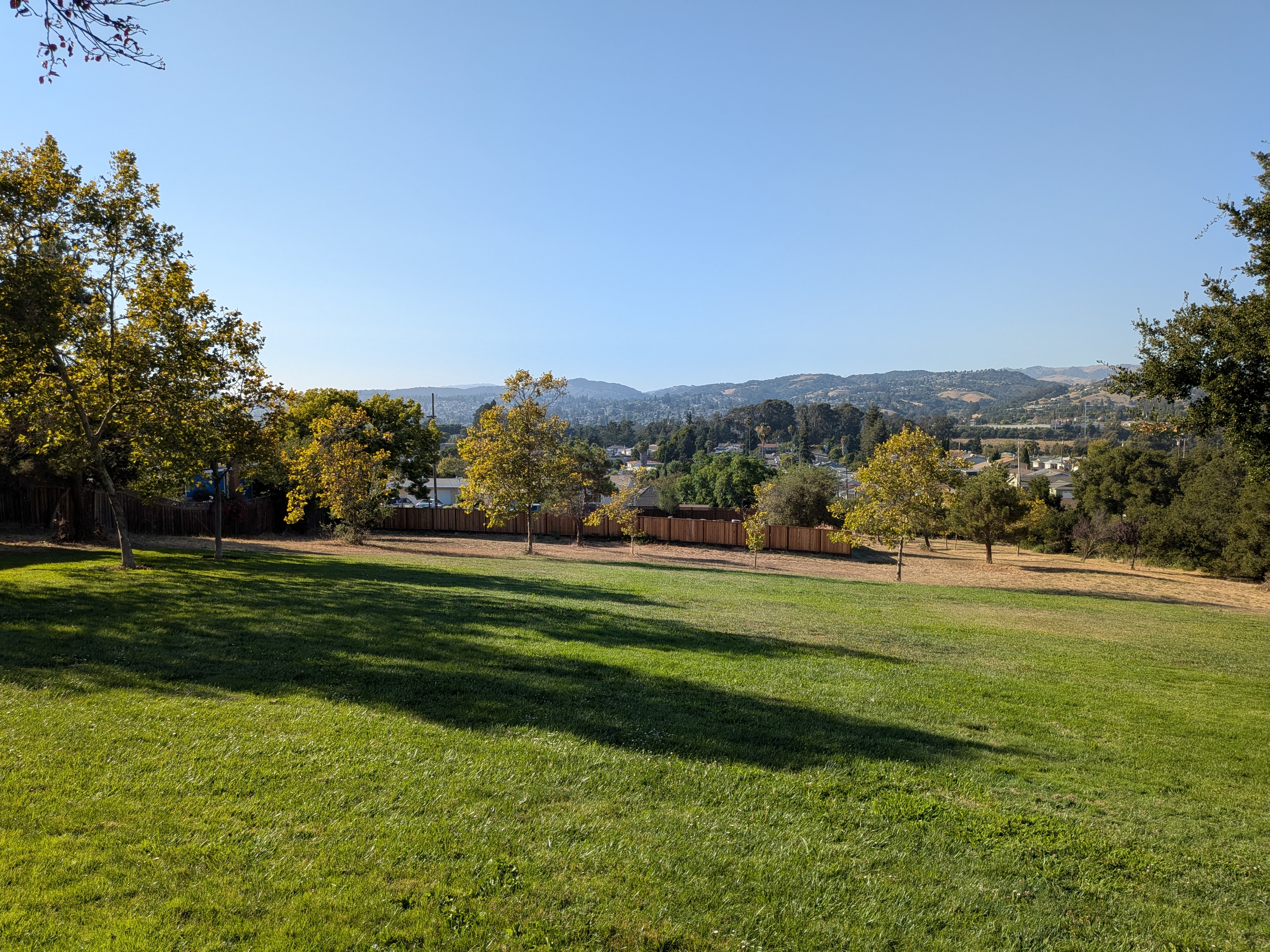
- Lakeridge Park in Fairview
- Interactive map of Fairview
- Location in the United States
- Coordinates: 37°40′43″N 122°02′45″W
- Country: United States
- State: California
- County: Alameda

Government
  - State Senate: Vacant
  - State Assembly: Liz Ortega (D)
  - U. S. Congress: Aisha Wahab (D)

Area
  - Total: 2.998 sq mi (7.76 km^{2})
  - Land: 2.974 sq mi (7.70 km^{2})
  - Water: 0.024 sq mi (0.062 km^{2}) 0.80%
- Elevation: 597 ft (182 m)

Population (2020)
  - Total: 11,341
  - Density: 3,813/sq mi (1,472/km^{2})
- Time zone: UTC-8 (Pacific (PST))
  - Summer (DST): UTC-7 (PDT)
- ZIP code: 94541, 94542
- Area codes: 510, 341
- FIPS code: 06-23350
- GNIS feature IDs: 1867023, 2408104

Fairview is a census-designated place (CDP) in unincorporated Alameda County, California, United States, in the East Bay subregion of the San Francisco Bay Area. It is included in the San Francisco–Oakland–San Jose Metropolitan Statistical Area by the US Census.

A mix of suburban bedroom community and low-density, multi-acre rural properties backed up against vast open space, Fairview borders the census-designated place of Castro Valley to the north and east, and the city of Hayward to the west. Fairview's population was 11,341 at the 2020 census.

== History ==
=== Early and Indigenous History ===
The hills that now form Fairview were part of the homeland of the Ohlone people, specifically the Chochenyo-speaking Muwekma band, who maintained villages and seasonal camps throughout the East Bay.

In 1843, the land was included in the Rancho San Lorenzo, a Mexican land grant awarded to Guillermo (William) Castro. The rancho extended over what are now Hayward, Castro Valley, San Lorenzo, and the surrounding hills, including Fairview. Following the American annexation of California, legal disputes and financial pressures forced Castro to sell off much of the rancho during the 1850s and 1860s, opening the area to American and European settlers.

A notable early landmark was the “Lone Tree,” which by the 19th century gave its name to Lone Tree Cemetery.

The Hayward Fault Zone runs directly through the Fairview Hills. The 1868 Hayward earthquake destroyed the Alameda County Courthouse and reshaped settlement patterns in the East Bay.

=== 19th Century ===
After the breakup of Rancho San Lorenzo, the Fairview Hills were settled as small ranches and farms. These were tied to the agricultural economy of Eden Township. Early farming focused on grains, shifting later to orchards and specialty crops.

Established in 1868, The Lone Tree Cemetery is located within Fairview, though it is often incorrectly cited as being within Hayward. Lone Tree is the burial site for William Dutton Hayward, the namesake of Hayward, as well as Bob Sweikert (winner of the 1955 Indianapolis 500), and The Wizard of Oz actor Charlie Becker. Lone Tree Cemetery has hosted an annual Memorial Day observance since 1903, considered one of the oldest continuous ceremonies of its kind in southern Alameda County. The Lone Tree Cemetery became an important institution for hillside residents and surrounding communities.

=== 20th Century ===
By the early 20th century, agriculture in Eden Township diversified further. Poultry and egg production became a defining industry, particularly in nearby Castro Valley and the hills around Fairview. Public service districts were formed to provide infrastructure to unincorporated areas. The Castro Valley Sanitary District was established in 1911, followed by other independent districts serving water, fire protection, and other needs.

During and after World War II, the Bay Area's wartime shipbuilding boom at Richmond Shipyards, Kaiser Shipyards, and Rosie the Riveter/World War II Home Front National Historical Park created a surge in housing demand. Many farms in the Eden area were subdivided for suburban housing, and the hills around Fairview saw significant residential development.

The Fairview Fire Protection District (FFPD) was established to provide local fire services and remains a small, independent district covering about four square miles.

=== 21st Century ===
Fairview today is primarily a residential community, with suburban lots and rural and semi-rural properties along the ridges. Alameda County adopted the original Fairview Area Specific Plan in 1980, updated it in 1997, and adopted a new plan in 2021.

==== Recognition as a Census-designated place ====
The Census Bureau defines census-designated places (CDPs) to tabulate data for unincorporated communities that resemble cities or towns but lack municipal governments. Fairview has been listed as a CDP in Census publications since at least 1990.

==== Governance and annexation ====
Fairview is unincorporated and falls within the sphere of influence of the City of Hayward, as determined by the Alameda Local Agency Formation Commission (LAFCo). Although Hayward provides some out-of-area utility services, annexation has not occurred due to fiscal and governance challenges and lack of support among residents. LAFCo studies, including a 2024 feasibility review of possible Castro Valley–Fairview incorporations, have concluded that incorporation or annexation scenarios would likely be financially infeasible.

Fairview residents have consistently and repeatedly voiced opposition to annexation into the City of Hayward, citing a desire to preserve the community's single‑family residential character, among other reasons. The Fairview Area Specific Plan Background Report remarks that residents have “worked to protect the neighborhood’s single‑family character” and were explicitly “against annexation of Fairview into Hayward.”

Fairview continues to rely on special districts such as the Fairview Fire Protection District and county-level planning under the Fairview Area Specific Plan. These arrangements, along with local advisory representation through the Fairview Municipal Advisory Council, have allowed the community to remain unincorporated rather than annex into Hayward.

== Geography and climate ==
According to the United States Census Bureau, the CDP has a total area of 3.0 square miles (7.8 km^{2}), of which, 3.0 square miles (7.8 km^{2}) is land and 0.02 square miles (0.05 km^{2}) (0.80%) is water.

The terrain is hilly to gently rolling, with elevations ranging from 200 feet near the Don Castro Regional Recreation Area (a park within the East Bay Regional Park District) to nearly 1,100 feet along Fairview Avenue.

=== Climate ===
Like much of the East Bay, Fairview has a Mediterranean climate (Köppen Csa) with hot, dry summers and mild, wet winters. Official 1991–2020 climate normals from the local weather station at nearby Hayward Executive Airport indicate warm summer afternoons and cool nights, and a cool season with most precipitation from November through March; annual precipitation at the airport averages about 18 inches, with somewhat higher totals at the higher elevations in the Fairview hills.

=== Geology and seismic risk ===
Fairview lies along the Hayward Fault Zone, a major right-lateral strike-slip fault that runs through the East Bay Hills. The fault is considered one of the most seismically hazardous in the United States, with a high probability of producing a major earthquake in coming decades. The 1868 Hayward earthquake, estimated at magnitude 6.8–7.0, caused widespread damage throughout Alameda County and reshaped local settlement patterns. Evidence of ongoing fault creep and offset can be observed along streets, curbs, and structures in the Hayward–Castro Valley–Fairview area.

== Demographics ==
Historical population
Census	Pop.	Note	%±
1990	9,045		—
2000	9,470		4.7%
2010	10,003		5.6%
2020	11,341		13.4%
U.S. Decennial Census; 1860–1870 1880-1890; 1900 1910 1920; 1930 1940 1950; 1960 1970 1980; 1990 2000 2010; 2020

Fairview first appeared as a census-designated place in the 1990 United States census.

=== Racial and ethnic composition ===
Fairview CDP, California – Racial and ethnic composition Note: the US Census treats Hispanic/Latino as an ethnic category. This table excludes Latinos from the racial categories and assigns them to a separate category. Hispanics/Latinos may be of any race.
Race / Ethnicity (NH = Non-Hispanic)	Pop 2000	Pop 2010	Pop 2020	% 2000	% 2010	% 2020
White alone (NH)	4,621	3,618	3,331	48.80%	36.17%	29.37%
Black or African American alone (NH)	1,901	2,047	1,703	20.07%	20.46%	15.02%
Native American or Alaska Native alone (NH)	29	45	15	0.31%	0.45%	0.13%
Asian alone (NH)	949	1,484	2,187	10.02%	14.84%	19.28%
Native Hawaiian or Pacific Islander alone (NH)	60	114	159	0.63%	1.14%	1.40%
Other race alone (NH)	34	23	96	0.36%	0.23%	0.85%
Mixed race or Multiracial (NH)	443	501	830	4.68%	5.01%	7.32%
Hispanic or Latino (any race)	1,433	2,171	3,020	15.13%	21.70%	26.63%
Total	9,470	10,003	11,341	100.00%	100.00%	100.00%

=== 2020 census ===
As of the 2020 census, Fairview had a population of 11,341 and a population density of 3,813.4 inhabitants per square mile (1,472.4/km^{2}).

The age distribution was 19.1% under the age of 18, 7.7% aged 18 to 24, 27.8% aged 25 to 44, 27.2% aged 45 to 64, and 18.2% who were 65 years of age or older. The median age was 41.3 years. For every 100 females, there were 98.6 males, and for every 100 females age 18 and over, there were 94.3 males.

The Census reported that 98.8% of the population lived in households, 0.7% lived in non-institutionalized group quarters, and 0.5% were institutionalized. 100.0% of residents lived in urban areas, while 0.0% lived in rural areas.

There were 3,756 households, out of which 32.2% included children under the age of 18, 54.6% were married-couple households, 6.2% were cohabiting couple households, 23.2% had a female householder with no spouse or partner present, and 16.0% had a male householder with no spouse or partner present. 17.9% of households were one person, and 7.8% were one person aged 65 or older. The average household size was 2.98, and there were 2,837 families (75.5% of all households).

There were 3,871 housing units at an average density of 1,301.6 units per square mile (502.6 units/km^{2}). Of the housing units, 3.0% were vacant and 97.0% were occupied; of occupied units, 76.9% were owner-occupied and 23.1% were occupied by renters. The homeowner vacancy rate was 0.9% and the rental vacancy rate was 3.1%.

=== Demographic estimates ===
In 2023, the US Census Bureau estimated that 26.5% of the population were foreign-born. Of all people aged 5 or older, 63.6% spoke only English at home, 16.3% spoke Spanish, 13.2% spoke other Indo-European languages, 6.3% spoke Asian or Pacific Islander languages, and 0.6% spoke other languages. Of those aged 25 or older, 92.4% were high school graduates and 41.9% had a bachelor's degree.

=== Income and poverty ===
The median household income was $148,801, and the per capita income was $59,469.

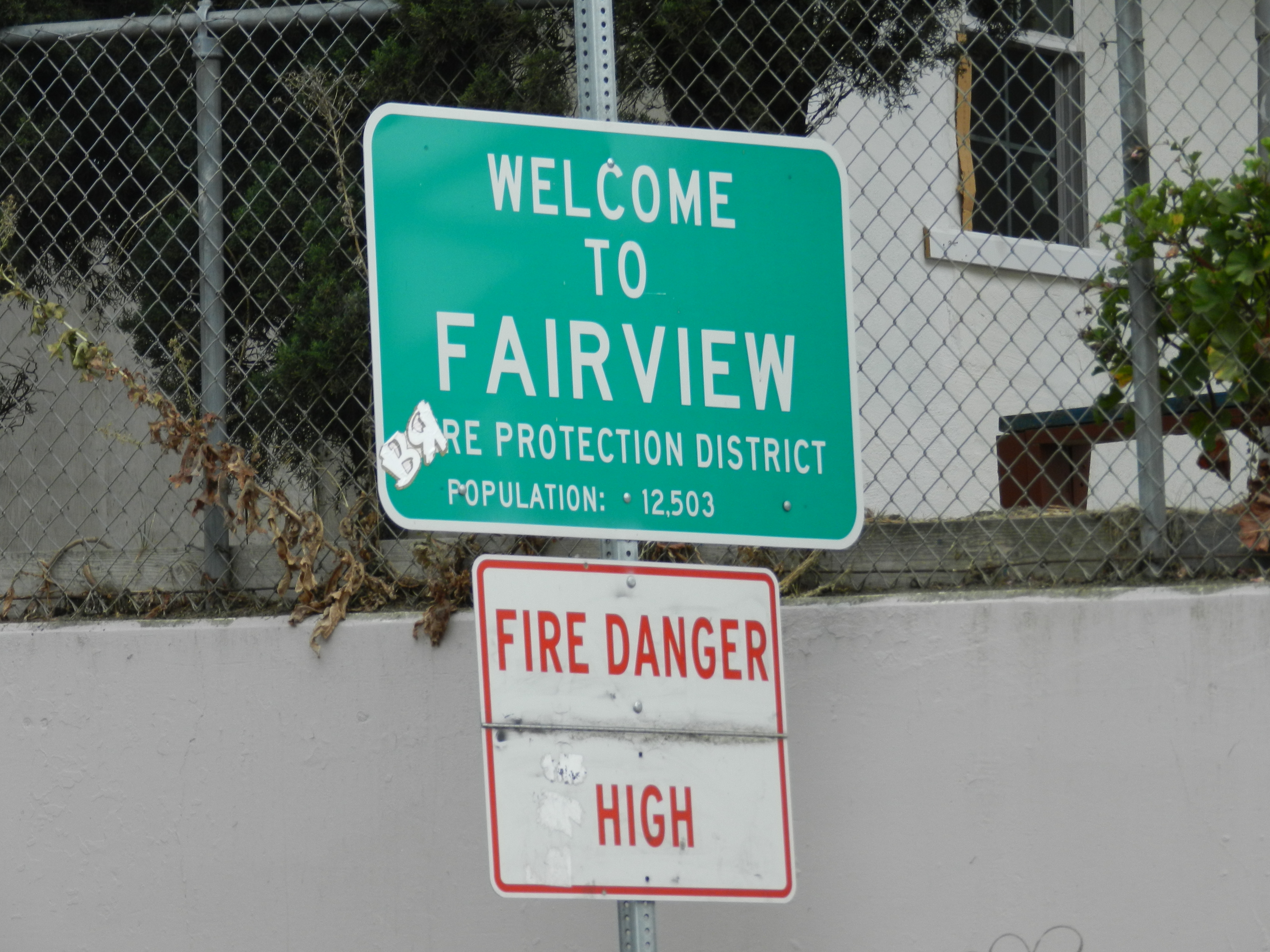
Signage at entrance to city and fire protection district

=== Crime ===
As an unincorporated CDP, Fairview does not have its own police department; law enforcement is provided by the Alameda County Sheriff's Office and California Highway Patrol.

Crime reporting is aggregated through countywide and broader municipal area data, but third-party analyses offer rough estimates. CrimeGrade.org gives Fairview a “C” grade for violent crime, with an estimated violent crime rate of 3.4 incidents per 1,000 residents, slightly higher than the national average. Property crime rates are somewhat elevated relative to national averages. In contrast, AreaVibes reports that overall crime in Fairview is about 53% lower than the national average. These figures must be interpreted cautiously, as methodologies differ, and official crime data is reported only at the county level—it does not breakout specific CDPs.

== Government ==
As an unincorporated community in Alameda County, Fairview has no city or town council and no municipal government. It is represented locally by the Alameda County Board of Supervisors, District 4. The Fairview Municipal Advisory Council (MAC) was established in 2017 with five appointed members to advocate for Fairview interests and advise the county Board of Supervisors on all matters concerning the community.

== Public safety ==
Law enforcement services are provided by the California Highway Patrol and Alameda County Sheriff's Office.

Fire services are provided through the Fairview Fire Protection District (FFPD), an independent special district in Alameda County formed in 1938. Since 1993, FFPD has subcontracted its operations to the Hayward Fire Department. Under the contract, Hayward staffs two fire stations and provides various services, including fire suppression, emergency medical services, auto accident rescue, and hazardous material response. The special district owns its own fire equipment and maintains Station 8 on Five Canyons Blvd and a storage station on Fairview Ave; Hayward provides all administrative and operational services and staffs Station 9 on Second Street. The contract was most recently renewed in 2021 and expires in 2026.

== Infrastructure and utilities ==
Water service in Fairview is provided primarily by the East Bay Municipal Utility District (EBMUD), with some properties being served by Hayward's municipal water service. Sewer service is handled by the Castro Valley Sanitary District (CVSan), which manages collection and treatment for the surrounding Eden area. Many of the more rural properties in Fairview maintain their own septic systems.

Solid waste and recycling collection are also managed through CVSan contracts with regional providers.

Electricity and natural gas are supplied by PG&E. Telecommunications and broadband service are offered by multiple regional providers. In addition to traditional cable and DSL networks, some areas have access to fiber to the home, and related architectures (FTTC, FTTB, etc.).

Postal mail is routed through the USPS Hayward distribution center, though since 2025 the USPS officially recognizes “Fairview, CA” as a valid mailing address independent of Hayward.

== Economy ==
Fairview is primarily a bedroom community, centrally located within the greater San Francisco Bay Area. Aside from a small grocery store and home-based services or businesses, there are no office, retail, or industrial locations within the community. Most residents commute to nearby employment centers in Hayward, Oakland, San Francisco, or Silicon Valley.

== Transportation ==
Fairview is accessed by Interstate 580, State Route 238 and Interstate 238. Local winding roads connect the residential hills to Hayward, Castro Valley, and Dublin.

Public transit service is available nearby but not directly within the CDP. Bay Area Rapid Transit (BART) operates stations in Castro Valley, Hayward, and Dublin. AC Transit provides bus service in adjacent communities with connections to BART. Automobiles remain the dominant mode of transportation for residents.

== Housing ==
The Fairview community is composed almost entirely of single-family detached homes, hillside estates on multi-acre parcels, and a few small clusters of townhomes. According to the 2020 Census and 2023 American Community Survey, about 76.9% of occupied housing units were owner-occupied, and 23.1% were renter-occupied. The median home value reported by the ACS was over $900,000, reflecting the high housing costs common across the Bay Area. Development is regulated under the Fairview Area Specific Plan, which emphasizes preservation of hillside character and limits large-scale subdivision.

== Parks and protected areas ==
Fairview encompasses the entirety of East Bay Regional Park District's 101-acre Don Castro Regional Recreation Area. The area includes the San Lorenzo Creek Reservoir, swimming lagoons, fishing areas, and access to the Bay Area Ridge Trail, the Chabot Trail, the Garin Trail, and the 300 acres and five miles of trails within Castro Valley's Five Canyons Open Space.

Fairview also includes the entirety of East Avenue Park, Five Canyons Park, and the Sulphur Creek Nature Center, and portions of Hayward's Green Belt Park, all managed by Hayward Area Recreation and Park District.

Beyond the eastern border of Fairview is vast open space stretching across miles of rolling hills, through Palomares Canyon and eventually to the City of Dublin.

== Education ==
For primary and secondary education, the majority of Fairview is served by the Hayward Unified School District (HUSD), with some properties along the border of Castro Valley falling into Castro Valley Unified School District (CVUSD) schools.

There are no public schools located directly in Fairview; students attend schools in neighboring Hayward or Castro Valley. Nearby higher education institutions include Chabot College in Hayward and California State University, East Bay, a couple miles south of Fairview.

== Culture and community ==
Community identity in Fairview is closely tied to its rural-suburban character and hillside open space. Annual Memorial Day ceremonies at Lone Tree Cemetery have been held continuously since 1903 and are among the oldest such observances in Alameda County. The Fairview Municipal Advisory Council, established in 2017, provides a forum for residents to advise the Alameda County Board of Supervisors on planning and service issues. Recreational and cultural amenities include the Sulphur Creek Nature Center, Don Castro Regional Recreation Area, and a network of trails connecting to the East Bay Ridge.

== Notable people ==
William Dutton Hayward, founder and namesake of the city of Hayward, is buried at Lone Tree Cemetery. Bob Sweikert, winner of the 1955 Indianapolis 500, is interred at Lone Tree Cemetery. Charlie Becker, actor known for his role in The Wizard of Oz, is also buried at Lone Tree Cemetery.

== See also ==
- Castro Valley, California
- Hayward, California
- Eden Township, Alameda County, California
- East Bay Regional Park District
- Hayward Fault Zone
