= World's Wonder View Tower =

Roadside attraction in Colorado, US

Coordinates: 39.2751°N 103.5103°W

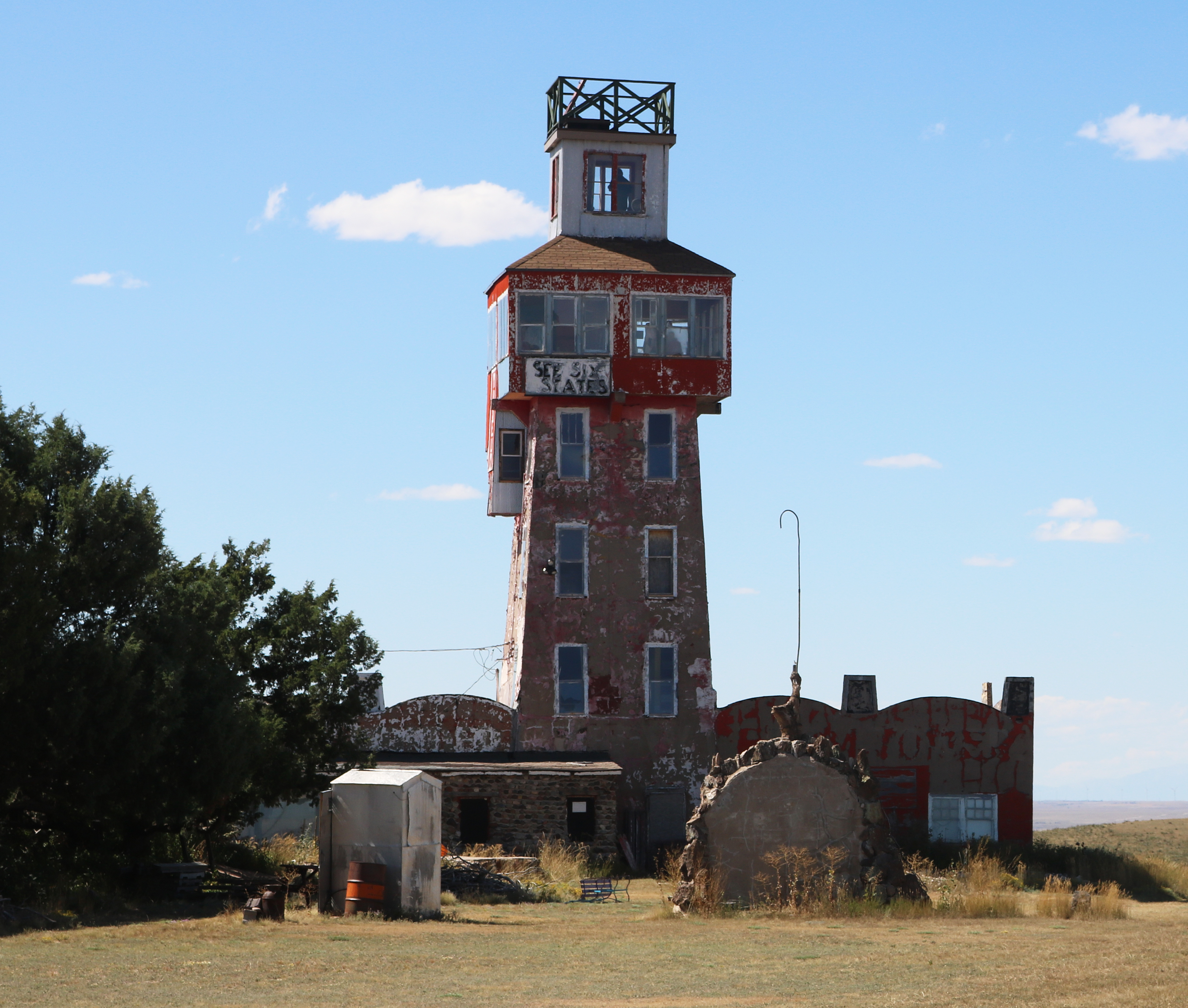
The tower in 2019

The World's Wonder View Tower is a tourist attraction and roadside attraction located in Genoa, Colorado. The tower was built in the mid-1920s by C.W. Gregory (known as Colorado's P. T. Barnum) and his partner Myrtle Le Bow. The promoters boasted that it is possible to see six states (Colorado, Kansas, Nebraska, Wyoming, New Mexico, and South Dakota) from the top of the tower.

The tower is 65 feet (20 m) tall. The site it was built on was confirmed in 1934 to be the highest point between New York and Denver. The tower is also a museum and vintage shop containing curiosities and novelty items such as a two-headed calf, an eight-legged pig, and more than 50,000 types of glass bottles. The museum also contains historic American West artifacts and weapons, Native American arrowheads and other artifacts, and fossils.

The tower closed due to the death of the owner; the contents were publicly auctioned off on September 20, 2014. It reopened in 2026 after an extensive renovation.
