= Bob Sweikert =

American racing driver (1926–1956)

- Born: Robert Charles Schweikart; May 20, 1926 Los Angeles, California, U.S.
- Died: June 17, 1956 (aged 30) Salem, Indiana, U.S.

Championship titles
- AAA Midwest Big Car (1955); AAA Championship Car (1955); Major victories Indianapolis 500 (1955)

Champ Car career
- 36 races run over 7 years
- Best finish: 1st (1955)
- First race: 1952 Indianapolis 500 (Indianapolis)
- Last race: 1956 Rex Mays Classic (Milwaukee)
- First win: 1953 Hoosier Hundred (ISF)
- Last win: 1955 Syracuse 100 (Syracuse)
Wins	Podiums	Poles
4	14	6

Formula One World Championship career
- Active years: 1950 – 1956
- Team(s): Wetteroth, Kurtis Kraft, Ewing, Kuzma
- Entries: 7 (5 starts)
- Championships: 0
- Wins: 1
- Podiums: 1
- Career points: 8
- Pole positions: 0
- Fastest laps: 0
- First entry: 1950 Indianapolis 500
- First win: 1955 Indianapolis 500
- Last entry: 1956 Indianapolis 500

Robert Charles Sweikert (May 20, 1926 – June 17, 1956) was an American racing driver, best known as the winner of the 1955 Indianapolis 500 and the 1955 National Championship, as well as the 1955 Midwest Sprint car championship – the only driver in history to sweep all three during a single racing season.

== Personal life ==
Robert Charles Schweikart grew up in pre-war Los Angeles. His surname was later changed to Sweikert to avoid anti-German sentiment before WWII. His mother had married his stepfather, an electrician for the state of California, when Bob was an infant. Bob was raised through his early teen years with his older stepbrother, Ed, who enlisted in the US Navy, and then soon died in 1942, at the onset of World War II. That year the family moved briefly to San Francisco, then across the bay to the rural town of Hayward, California. There in high school Bob met his future wife, Dorie.

From the age of 16, Sweikert worked after school as a mechanic at the local Ford dealership in Hayward. A naturally gifted mechanic, he frequently won street races throughout the East Bay. One of his frequent local competitors on the streets was Ed Elisian, a teenage boy from nearby Oakland, California. A dozen years later, Elisian and Sweikert were engaged in the racing duel that led to Sweikert's fatal crash at Salem Speedway.

In late 1944, Sweikert enrolled in the US Army Air Force, but suffered a severe knee injury while training at Lowry Field in Colorado. With months to heal and the war over, he was honorably discharged in September 1945.

In 1947, Sweikert met his first wife, Marion Edwards, at a party at UCLA. During 1947 Sweikert began mailing monthly accounts of his life to Veda Orr, through April 1956. Karl & Veda Orr built & operated their own race cars. Veda wrote many racing articles.

Sweikert returned to Hayward and opened his own small business, Sweikert Automotive, an automotive repair shop based out of his parents' garage. There over the next couple years, he built his own track roadster. On Memorial Day, May 26, 1947 Sweikert ran his first race for prize money at the Oakland Speedway, and finished second.

Sweikert then quit automotive repair and became a full-time driver. He gained his first racing sponsorship in July 1947, when he became a track roadster race driver for Hubbard Auto Parts of Oakland.

In early 1948, Sweikert married Marion Edwards. They had a large family wedding in West L.A. The same year, Sweikert moved up to midget cars, and won his first training race with the Bay Cities Racing Association. He ran seventy-two races that first BCRA season, finishing 14th out of 130 active members in the annual point standings.

In late 1952, Sweikert's first wife, Marion, started divorce proceedings. He fought for custody of their young daughter. Sweikert's mother, Grace, often visited Bob's firstborn until Grace died.

In January 1953, Sweikert married his high school sweetheart, divorcee Dorie with her two children, with whom he had recently become reacquainted. They settled in Indiana, to be close to the Speedway where Sweikert hoped to race and win.

== Driving career ==
On February 12, 1949 Sweikert won the first BCRA Indoor Midget Race Track championship, in Oakland, on the new 1/12 mile oval track.

Sweikert's first chance at driving a Sprint car came next in 1949. He drove in northern California that year and later in Los Angeles.

After 1949 Sweikert became close friends with Johnny Boyd of Fresno, California when he met him on the California racing circuit. The two often raced together, and Boyd qualified for entry in the 1955 Indianapolis 500 when Sweikert helped him overcome mechanical handling problems in Boyd's car.

In May 1952, Sweikert ran his first Indianapolis 500. He entered at the 32nd starting position and ran for 77 laps in the McNamara Special car.

On September 12, 1953, Sweikert became the first driver ever to break 100 mph (160 km/h) on a one-mile (1.6 km) oval track, at the Eastern Speed Dome, Syracuse, New York.

On September 26, 1953l Sweikert won the Hoosier Hundred, at the Indiana State Fairgrounds, a race which is chronicled by many as "the greatest race ever" run.

On September 11, 1954, Sweikert became the first driver ever to average 90 mph (140 km/h) in a 100-mile (160 km) race, with his win in the Lutes Truck Parts Special #17 car at the Eastern Speed Dome in Syracuse.

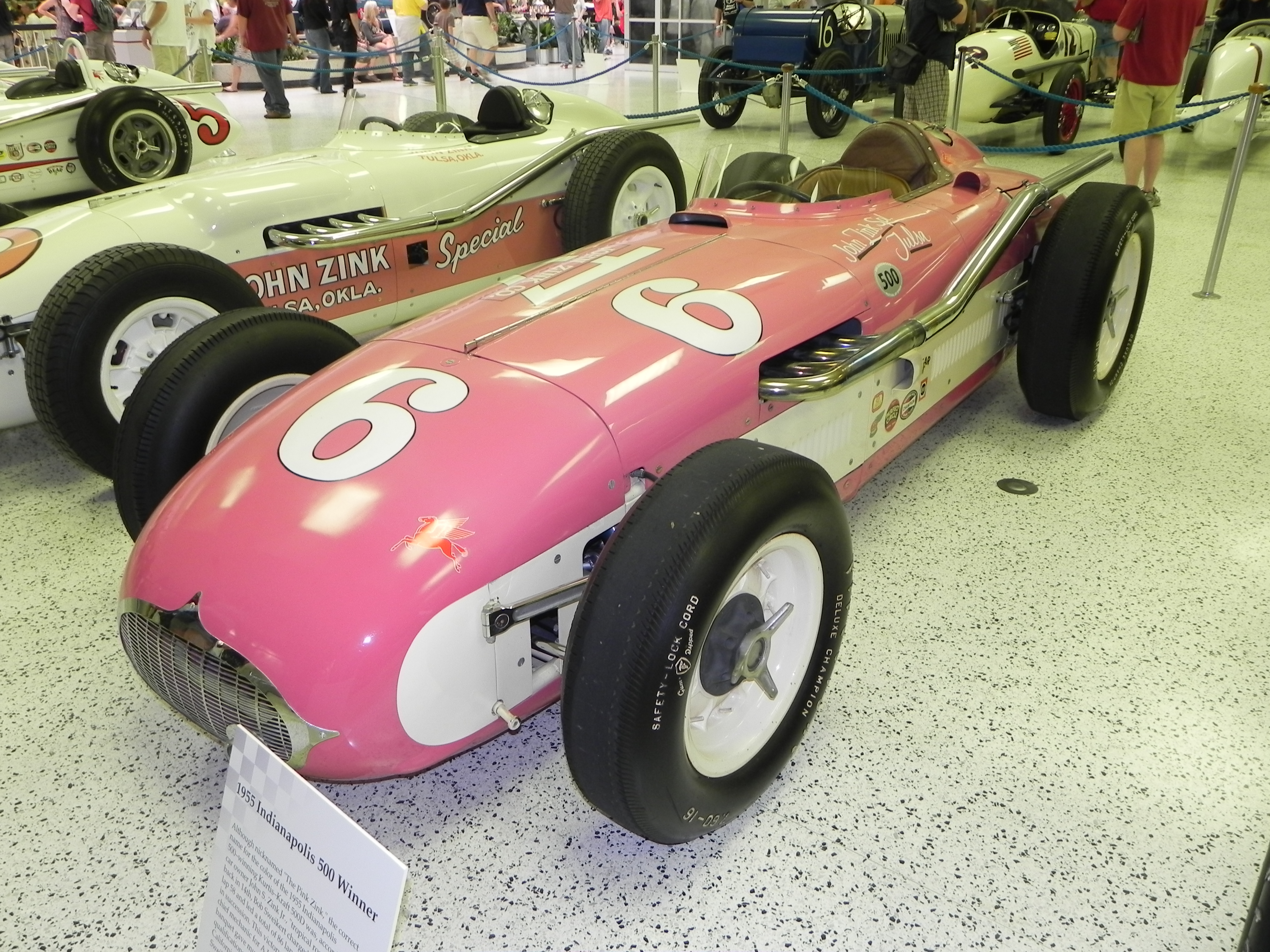
Sweikert's winning car from the 1955 Indianapolis 500

On May 30, 1955, Sweikert won the Indianapolis 500 from the 14th starting position in the Zink Kurtis roadster #6. That car now resides in the Museum at the Indianapolis racetrack. In the winner's circle, Sweikert and Dorie celebrated with singer-actress Dinah Shore.

In September 1955, Sweikert became the only driver in history to win the Indianapolis 500, the AAA big car National Championship, and the Midwest sprint car championship in the same season.

In May 1956, at his final return to the Indianapolis 500, Sweikert began in the 10th starting position and came in for a 6th-place finish, with the team's D-A Lubricant roadster.

=== World Drivers' Championship career ===
The AAA/USAC-sanctioned Indianapolis 500 was included in the FIA World Drivers' Championship from 1950 through 1960. Drivers competing at Indianapolis during those years were credited with World Drivers' Championship points and participation in addition to those which they received towards the AAA/USAC National Championship.

Sweikert participated in five World Drivers' Championship races at Indianapolis. He won once, and accumulated eight World Drivers' Championship points.

== Death ==
Sweikert's fatal sprint car crash occurred on June 17, 1956, at Salem Speedway. While completing the third lap, Sweikert was running near the outside wall in 4th place, side by side with his past teenage East Bay streets rival, Ed Elisian, in 5th. Coming out of the 4th turn, the two cars started down the straightaway in front of the grandstand. Running close to the wall, Sweikert's right rear wheel clipped a steel beam sticking out onto the track from the wall at the end of the stands. The sprint car flew over the edge of the track, down the embankment, and landed a hundred feet below, where it briefly burst into flames. Sweikert was pronounced dead upon arrival at Washington County Hospital.

Sweikert is buried at Lone Tree Cemetery in Fairview, California.

== Awards and honors ==
Sweikert has been inducted into the following halls of fame:

- Hoosier Auto Racing Fan Club Hall of Fame (1956)
- Motoring Press Association Hall of Fame (1993)
- Auto Racing Hall of Fame (1994)
- National Sprint Car Hall of Fame (1995)
- Motorsports Hall of Fame of America (2016)
- West Coast Stock Car/Motorsports Hall of Fame (2019)

== Motorsports career results ==
=== AAA Championship Car results ===
Year	1	2	3	4	5	6	7	8	9	10	11	12	13	14	15	Pos	Points
1950	INDY; DNQ	MIL	LAN	SPR	MIL	PIK	SYR	DET	SPR	SAC	PHX	BAY	DAR			-	0
1951	INDY; DNQ	MIL	LAN	DAR	SPR	MIL	DUQ	DUQ	PIK	SYR	DET	DNC	SJS	PHX	BAY	-	0
1952	INDY; 26	MIL; 12	RAL; DNQ	SPR; DNQ	MIL; 21	DET; DNQ	DUQ; 12	PIK	SYR	DNC; DNS	SJS	PHX				47th	20
1953	INDY; 20	MIL; 17	SPR	DET	SPR; DNQ	MIL; 13	DUQ; 17	PIK	SYR; 8	ISF; 1	SAC; 2	PHX; 12				15th	420
1954	INDY; 14	MIL; 11	LAN; 4	DAR; 22	SPR; 4	MIL; 22	DUQ; 8	PIK	SYR; 1	ISF; 2	SAC; 3	PHX; 3	LVG; 14			6th	950
1955	INDY; 1	MIL; 2	LAN; 2	SPR; 2	MIL; 3	DUQ; 4	PIK	SYR; 1	ISF; 17	SAC; 3	PHX; 18					1st	2,290
1956	INDY; 6	MIL; 3	LAN	DAR	ATL	SPR	MIL	DUQ	SYR	ISF	SAC	PHX				15th	540

== Indianapolis 500 results ==
Year	Car	Start	Qual	Rank	Finish	Laps	Led	Retired
1952	73	32	134.983	21	26	77	0	Differential
1953	51	29	136.872	11	20	151	0	Radius rod
1954	17	9	138.206	22	14	197	0	Flagged
1955	6	14	139.996	11	1st	200	86	Running
1956	1	10	143.033	12	6	200	0	Running
Totals						825	86	

Starts	5
Poles	0
Front Row	0
Wins	1
Top 5	1
Top 10	2
Retired	2

Preceded by Bill Vukovich	Indianapolis 500 Winner; 1955	Succeeded by Pat Flaherty
