= William Dutton Hayward =

American politician (1815–1891)

- Born: William Dutton Hayward; August 31, 1815; Hopkinton, Massachusetts, U.S.
- Died: July 10, 1891 (aged 75); Hayward, California, U.S.
- Resting place: Lone Tree Cemetery
- Occupations: Farmer, politician

William Dutton Hayward (August 31, 1815 – July 10, 1891) was an American farmer and politician who was the founder and namesake of the city of Hayward, California.

== Biography ==
Hayward was born in 1815 and raised on a farm near Hopkinton, Massachusetts. In 1836, he moved to Georgetown, Massachusetts, where he remained for ten years working in a shoe factory. He was married in 1836 to Louisa Bartlett (born Lois-White Bartlett). Their daughter Sarah Louise Hayward was born in 1838. His wife died in 1840.

=== California Gold Rush ===
Hayward moved to California via the Strait of Magellan in 1849 to the gold fields. He supported himself while mining for gold. However, he eventually returned to the San Francisco Bay Area. He squatted temporarily on Guillermo Castro's ranch, in Palomares Canyon. Castro tried to evict him, but Hayward persuaded him to let him stay and made Castro a pair of boots. Castro decided to hire him after seeing the quality of the boots.

He saved up enough money to buy 40 acres (160,000 m^{2}) of Castro's land, including what is now the downtown Hayward area. On the land, he established a store and a small dairy operation. This land was along the road that ran from San Jose to Oakland .

Castro emigrated to Chile with most of his family in 1864, after he lost his land in a card game. His ranch was split up and sold to various locals, Hayward among them. He constructed a resort hotel on what is now the northeast corner of Main and A Streets, which eventually grew to a hundred rooms. The surrounding area came to be called "Haywards" after William's hotel which bore the name "Haywards Hotel"

=== Haywards Hotel ===
The hotel became a destination for travelers and tourists. It grew to include four stories, a lobby, reception rooms, dining halls, and sitting and card rooms and served as a post office. The hotel was destroyed by fire in 1923, decades after Hayward's death .

=== Town of Haywards ===
William then became the road commissioner for Alameda County. He used his authority to influence the construction of roads in his own favor. In 1876, the town was chartered under the name of "Haywards". However, it was not legal to name a post office after a living person, so the official name was "Haywood". In 1876, "Haywood" was incorporated as the "Town of Haywards", with a population of 1,100.

William served two terms on the Alameda County Board of Supervisors.

On April 5, 1866, Hayward married Rachel Rhodes Bedford, a widow. She had a daughter from her first marriage, Mary E. Bedford (b. Feb. 1852). William and Rachel Hayward had one child together, William Martin Hayward. Rachel Rhodes Bedford Hayward proved a skilled businesswoman, and was largely responsible for the success of Haywards Hotel. She arranged and managed parties, receptions, picnics, rides, and entertainment for guests.

== Death and legacy ==
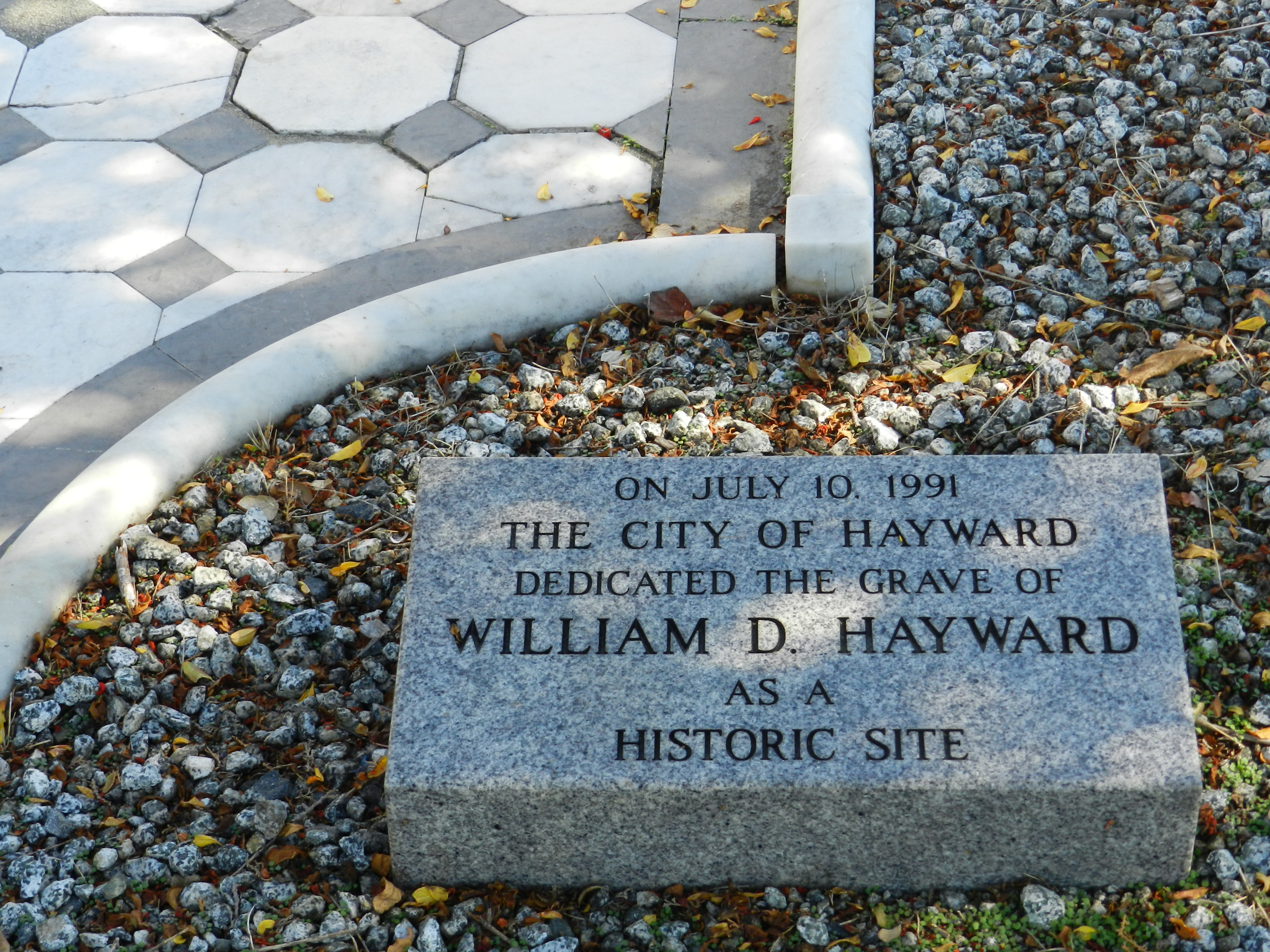
1991 dedication at Hayward gravesite

William Hayward died at age 75, as a result of skin cancer, at Haywards Hotel, and was buried in Lone Tree Cemetery in Fairview, California, near Hayward. According to his tombstone, William died on July 10, 1891. Also buried there, according to the tombstone, were "Rachel H. Hayward" described as "Mother of Hayward" (presumably meaning the city's mother, not William's mother) who died at age 86, William Martin Hayward the "only son of William and Rachel Hayward" who died on November 20, 1893 "aged 26 years 8 months 14 days", and Sarah Louise Hayward (1838-1909), William's daughter by his first wife.

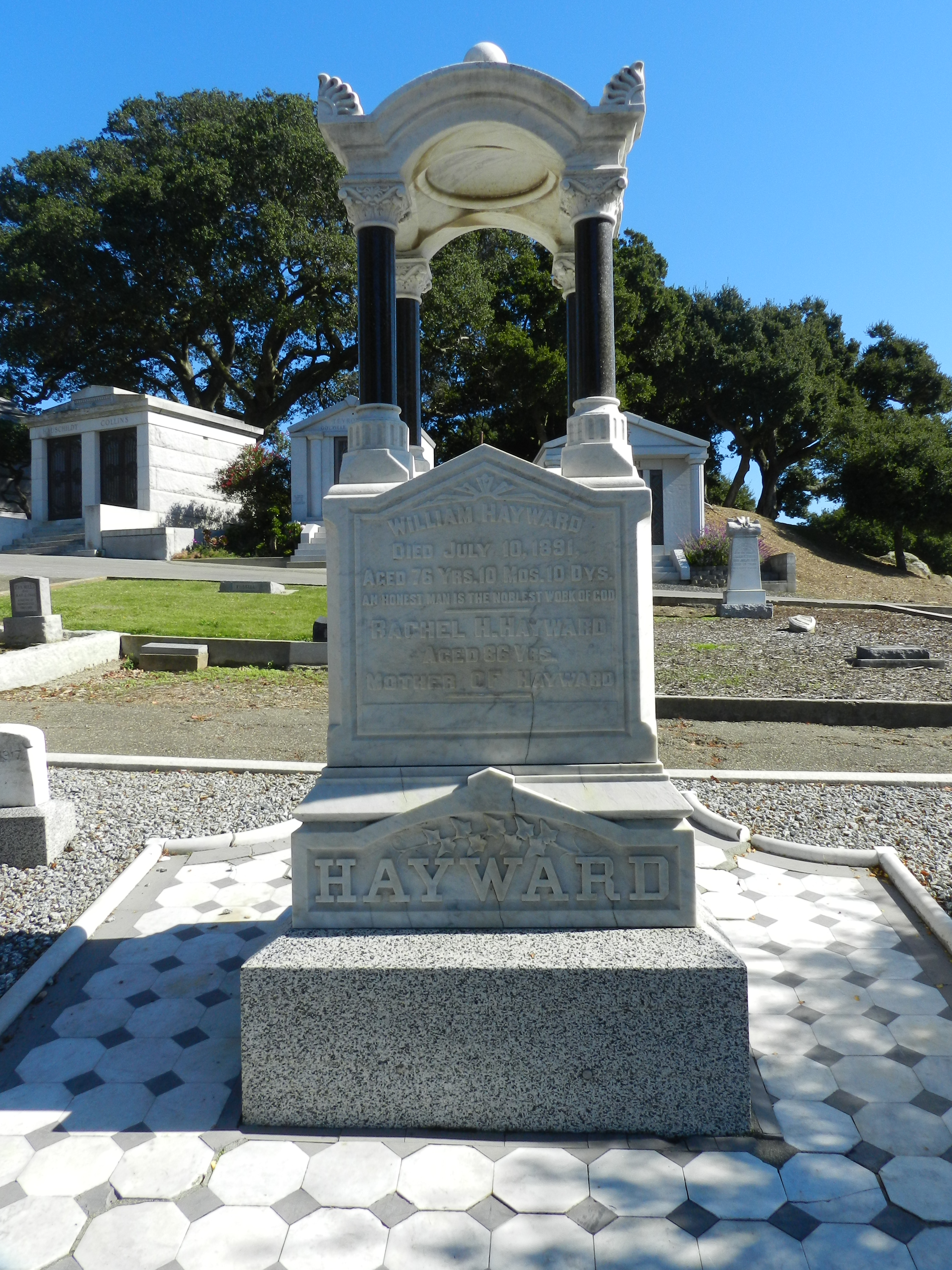
Hayward grave at Lone Tree Cemetery

In 1894, the "s" in "Haywards" was dropped and on September 18, 1928, the city's name was changed to the "City of Hayward."
