= Bill Vukovich =

American racing driver (1918–1955)

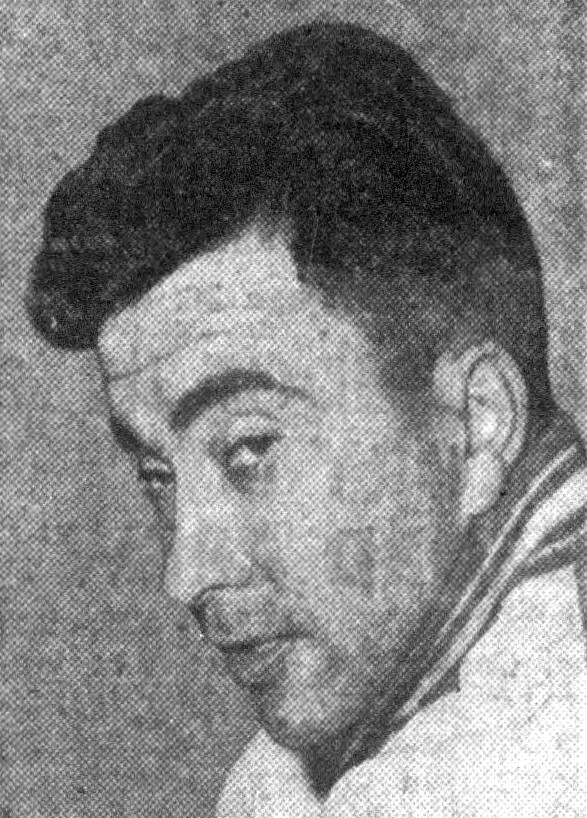
- Vukovich, circa 1951
- Born: Vaso Vukovich; December 13, 1918 Alameda, California, U.S.
- Died: May 30, 1955 (aged 36) Speedway, Indiana, U.S.

Championship titles
- AAA National Midget Car (1950); Major victories Indianapolis 500 (1953, 1954)

Champ Car career
- 22 races run over 6 years
- Best finish: 3rd (1953)
- First race: 1951 Indianapolis 500 (Indianapolis)
- Last race: 1955 Indianapolis 500 (Indianapolis)
- First win: 1952 Detroit 100 (Detroit)
- Last win: 1954 Indianapolis 500 (Indianapolis)
| Wins | Podiums | Poles |
|---|---|---|
| 4 | 6 | 3 |

Formula One World Championship career
- Active years: 1950 – 1955
- Team(s): Maserati, Trevis, Kurtis Kraft
- Entries: 6 (5 starts)
- Championships: 0
- Wins: 2
- Podiums: 2
- Career points: 19
- Pole positions: 1
- Fastest laps: 3
- First entry: 1950 Indianapolis 500
- First win: 1953 Indianapolis 500
- Last win: 1954 Indianapolis 500
- Last entry: 1955 Indianapolis 500

William Vukovich (born Vaso Vukovich, December 13, 1918 – May 30, 1955) was an American racing driver. He won the 1953 and 1954 Indianapolis 500s, plus two more American Automobile Association National Championship races, and died while leading the 1955 Indianapolis 500.

Several drivers of his generation have referred to Vukovich as the greatest ever in American motorsport. He is generally considered one of the best racing drivers of his generation, and is the only driver to lead the most laps in three consecutive Indianapolis 500s.

== Early life ==
=== Childhood ===
William Vukovich was born in Alameda, near Oakland, California. He was the fifth of eight children and the youngest of three sons born to John Vucurovich, a carpenter and police officer, and Mildred (née Syerković). Vukovich's parents emigrated from Serbia, and Anglicized their surname from "Vucurović" to Vucurovich to aid its pronunciation. Later, upon suggestion of the judge presiding over their naturalization, the couple adopted the spelling Vukovich, using it for their children. Vukovich was christened with the given name Vaso, not adopting the English variant William until entering public school.

Not long after Vukovich's birth, his family relocated to a 40-acre farm in Kerman, near Fresno, where his father worked as a sharecropper. The family earned a modest living, and on one occasion Vukovich was hired out as a cotton picker to supplement the family income. Later, his family moved to Sanger, where they made a down-payment on a 20-acre muscat grape vineyard. The move took place against the wishes of Vukovich's mother, who was concerned about the age of the vines. In December 1932, after a poor harvest and struggling to complete the final payments for their property, they were issued a foreclosure notice. Unable to deal with the situation, John Vucurovich committed suicide, dying December 11, 1932, two days before Vukovich's 14th birthday.

=== Family provider ===
The death of Vukovich's father increased the family's financial difficulties, and they were forced to leave the property a few days after the funeral. A neighbor helped them locate a house to rent, the owner of which allowed the family to keep any profits they made from harvesting peach trees which grew on the rental's property. Vukovich's three eldest siblings had already grown up and left for independent lives, leaving Vukovich and his elder brother, Eli, as the new providers for the family. The two brothers worked various jobs harvesting and tilling crops, and driving trucks, sometimes joined by their older brother, Mike.

Vukovich enjoyed attending school, doing well in industrial arts courses. A sophomore at the time of his father's death, Vukovich attempted to balance his education with his increased familial responsibilities, but was soon forced to drop out. Vukovich was known as a taciturn child. After the death of his father, however, he became even more withdrawn. By the time Vukovich reached age 15, Eli had moved out, after which Vukovich assumed a paternal role in the lives of his two younger sisters, Ann and Florence.

Vukovich continued in this role after the early beginnings of his racing career. By the late 1930s, Vukovich's mother was often ill, suffering from painful swelling which required frequent visits for medical care. While his earnings from racing helped augment the family's financial situation, his mother's difficulties with English required significant assistance from Vukovich in completing the paperwork required for free care. Eventually, his mother's illness required around the clock care at the hospital. Vukovich's schedule saw him work on farms during the day, travel to the hospital - often spending evenings conversing with his mother in Serbian until visiting hours were up - then spend his late night hours working on his race car. Mildred Vukovich died aged 51, on March 26, 1939, by which time Ann and Florence had moved out.

=== Early interests in racing ===
Vukovich displayed an interest in speed from an early age. He and his brothers were known to frequently arrive at school with their four-wheeled, horse-drawn cart on two wheels, leading to their father building a two-wheeled cart. The family owned a Ford Model T, and on Sundays when their parents left to go into town the brothers would race it around the yard, using a rake to clear their tracks. They eventually rolled the automobile, badly damaging the collapsible top, which the brothers concealed for a time by forcing it down and covering the automobile with hay from the barn in which it was stored. The activity was ended when Vukovich suffered a sprained wrist after reaching out in an attempt to prevent another roll-over.

Around the age of seven Vukovich and his brothers began attending Championship car races at Fresno Speedway, a board track located more than 20 miles from their home in Kerman. Riding bicycles, the trio occasionally arrived days in advance to search for opportunities to watch the races for free. Located on the Fresno County Fairgrounds, the speedway was torn down in 1927, and a previously existing dirt track restored. While the new oval no longer held major events, the brothers continued sneaking into the track through the early 1930s.

All three brothers were interested in mechanics, and when Mike and Eli purchased junk cars to turn into hot rods, Vukovich assisted them. When a family friend working for Fresno County clearing roadside ditches discovered a derelict Model T, he notified Vukovich. Vukovich had the car hauled home, and with the help of his brothers and younger sister, Ann, eventually got it running again. In 1934, Mike decided to begin racing in earnest, and Bill and Eli helped him convert a 1926 model Chevrolet into a track roadster.

== Driving career ==
=== Early career ===
Vukovich assisted Mike for more than a year. During this time he also began working as a "stooge" - assisting various teams by retrieving parts and tools - offering Vukovich exposure to situations and information which proved useful once he began his own driving career. He eventually began asking people for chances to drive, but was turned away repeatedly. In 1936, at age 17, Vukovich was allowed to drive a Chevrolet-powered track roadster owned by future Indianapolis car builder Fred Gerhardt. The opportunity was granted after Vukovich appeared at Gerhardt's shop over several days, repeatedly asking to drive the latter's car.

During Vukovich's first event he made it into the "B" main, a race held for those not quick enough to qualify for the feature, or "main," event. He finished second. The next race weekend he was again in the "B" main, and won, qualifying him for the feature, from which he dropped out with a mechanical issue, after what biographer Bob Gates considered a strong run. The week after Vukovich again made the feature, finishing third, and on his fourth week, Vukovich won the main event.

Vukovich won regularly after his initial victory, competing at tracks in Newton, Chowchilla, and Goshen. During one event at Goshen, Vukovich was involved in a battle with Duane Carter, when his steering wheel collapsed, sending Vukovich into an accident where the jagged metal of the wheel deeply gashed his chest, requiring stitches and several days of rest. Vukovich's brothers hid the extent of the injuries from their mother, explaining that Bill was staying to be closer to some upcoming races. During the 1936 season, Gerhardt, despite a tight financial situation, allowed Vukovich to keep his prize earnings.

The United States' entry into the Second World War saw a suspension of racing. During the war Vukovich relocated to Riverside, California, and found work maintaining Jeeps and other vehicles for the U.S. Army.

=== Post-war midget car career ===
Before he began Indy car racing, Vukovich drove midget cars for the Edelbrock dirt track racing team. He raced on the West Coast of the United States in the United Racing Association (URA), and won the series' 1945 and 1946 midget car championships. Vukovich won the 1948 Turkey Night Grand Prix at Gilmore Stadium, and six of the last eight races at the stadium track before it was closed for good. He also won the 1950 AAA National Midget championship.

Vukovich was known for racing midgets powered by Drake engines. The Drake was a Harley-Davidson V-twin engine with specially built Drake water cooled heads. His last Drake powered midget was a Kurtis Kraft that was built by Ed and Zeke Justice, the Justice Brothers, in their shop in Glendale from a Kurtis kit. Previous to this car, Vukovich drove a "Frame Rail" midget that was also powered by a Drake engine.

=== Indianapolis 500 ===
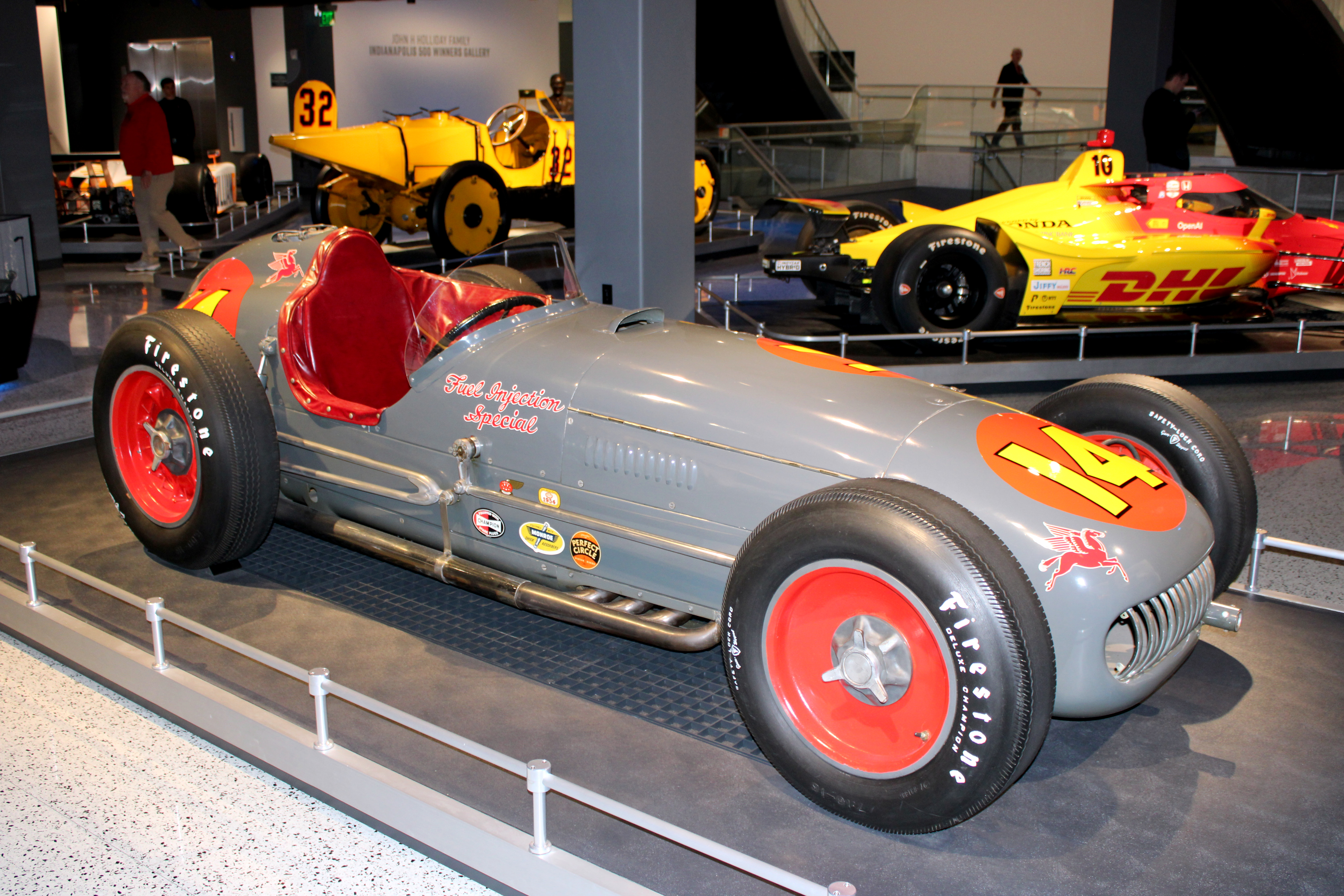
Vukovich's winning car from the 1953 and 1954 Indianapolis 500s

In 1952, his second year in the Indianapolis Motor Speedway's 500-Mile Race, Vukovich quickly moved up from his starting position in the middle of the third row to take the lead, and led 150 laps in dominant fashion before suffering steering failure on the 192nd of the 200 laps. He returned to win the race in consecutive years, 1953 and 1954. He led an astounding 71.7% of laps that he drove in competition at the track, and remains the only driver ever to lead the most laps in the race three consecutive years.

=== World Drivers' Championship career ===
The AAA/USAC-sanctioned Indianapolis 500 was included in the FIA World Drivers' Championship from 1950 through 1960. Drivers competing at Indianapolis during those years were credited with World Drivers' Championship points and participation in addition to those which they received towards the AAA/USAC National Championship.

Vukovich entered six and participated in five World Drivers' Championship races at Indianapolis. He started on pole once, won twice, recorded three fastest laps, and accumulated 19 World Drivers' Championship points.

== Death ==
Vukovich was killed in a chain-reaction crash while holding a 17-second lead on the 57th lap of the 1955 Indianapolis 500. He was exiting the second turn, trailing three slower cars – driven by Rodger Ward, Al Keller, and Johnny Boyd – when Ward's car hit the backstretch outer wall and flipped, resting in the middle of the track as a result of a broken axle. Keller, swerving into the infield to avoid Ward, lost control and slid back onto the track, striking Boyd's car and pushing it into Vukovich's path. After Vukovich's car went over the outside wall and become airborne, it cartwheeled through the air multiple times landing on top of a group of parked cars before coming to rest upside down and bursting into flames. Boyd's car also flipped over and landed upside down as well. As Vukovich's car burned, Ed Elisian stopped his undamaged car and raced towards the stricken machine in an attempt to save the other driver. It did not matter; Vukovich had perished instantly. Two spectators were also injured when Vukovich's car landed on their Jeep. Vukovich was the second defending Indianapolis 500 winner to die during the race, following Floyd Roberts in 1939, and the only former winner to have been killed while leading. Roberts's car was also thrown over the backstretch fence after exiting the second turn in his fatal accident.

Vukovich is buried at Belmont Memorial Park, Fresno, California. The Fresno Junior Chamber of Commerce established the "Billy Vukovich Memorial Scholarship Fund" to honor the two-time winner of the Indy 500 with a living memorial. The fund was directed to the Fresno State College and was open to young men interested in preparing themselves to teach automotive mechanics in high schools.

== Family and personal life ==
Vukovich married Esther Schmidt, the two meeting during a blind date several months previously. Vukovich was shy, and the couple's early courtship saw him use Esther's younger sister as a go-between when setting up dates. The couple had two children: a daughter, Marlene, born in 1941; and a son, William John, born in 1944. Vukovich's son, known as Bill Vukovich II; and his grandson, Bill Vukovich III, also became racing drivers. Both competed in the Indianapolis 500, with Vukovich II finishing second in 1973, and Vukovich III being named the Rookie of the Year in 1988. Vukovich III died on November 25, 1990, in a crash during practice for a CRA race at Mesa Marin Raceway, in Bakersfield, California.

== Awards and honors ==
Vukovich has been inducted into the following halls of fame:

- Fresno Athletic Hall of Fame (1959)
- Auto Racing Hall of Fame (1972)
- National Midget Auto Racing Hall of Fame (1990)
- International Motorsports Hall of Fame (1991)
- Motorsports Hall of Fame of America (1992)
- West Coast Stock Car/Motorsports Hall of Fame (2019)

== Motorsports career results ==
=== AAA Championship Car results ===
| Year | 1 | 2 | 3 | 4 | 5 | 6 | 7 | 8 | 9 | 10 | 11 | 12 | 13 | 14 | 15 | Pos | Points |
|---|---|---|---|---|---|---|---|---|---|---|---|---|---|---|---|---|---|
| 1950 | INDY; DNQ | MIL | LAN | SPR | MIL | PIK | SYR | DET | SPR | SAC; DNQ | PHX | BAY | DAR | | | - | 0 |
| 1951 | INDY; 29 | MIL; DNQ | LAN; 14 | DAR; 26 | SPR; 15 | MIL; 21 | DUQ; 7 | DUQ; DNQ | PIK | SYR; 3 | DET; 7 | DNC; 11 | SJS; 18 | PHX | BAY; DNQ | 23rd | 291.8 |
| 1952 | INDY; 17 | MIL; DNQ | RAL; 24 | SPR; DNQ | MIL | DET; 1 | DUQ; 3 | PIK | SYR; 14 | DNC; 1 | SJS; 14 | PHX; 8 | | | | 12th | 590 |
| 1953 | INDY; 1 | MIL | SPR | DET | SPR | MIL | DUQ | PIK | SYR | ISF | SAC; DNQ | PHX | | | | 3rd | 1,000 |
| 1954 | INDY; 1 | MIL; 22 | LAN | DAR | SPR | MIL | DUQ | PIK | SYR | ISF | SAC | PHX | LVG | | | 4th | 1,000 |
| 1955 | INDY; 25 | MIL | LAN | SPR | MIL | DUQ | PIK | SYR | ISF | SAC | PHX | | | | | - | 0 |

=== Indianapolis 500 results ===
| Year | Car | Start | Qual | Rank | Finish | Laps | Led | Retired |
|---|---|---|---|---|---|---|---|---|
| 1950 | 10 | – | – | – | – | – | – | Did not qualify |
| 1951 | 81 | 20 | 133.725 | 16 | 29 | 29 | | Oil tank |
| 1952 | 26 | 8 | 138.212 | 2 | 17 | 191 | 150 | Steering |
| 1953 | 14 | 1 | 138.392 | 1 | **1st** | 200 | 195 | Running |
| 1954 | 14 | 19 | 138.478 | 15 | **1st** | 200 | 90 | Running |
| 1955 | 4 | 5 | 141.071 | 3 | 25 | 56 | 50 | Fatal accident |
| **Totals** | | | | | | 676 | 485 | |

| Starts | 5 |
| Poles | 1 |
| Front row | 1 |
| Wins | 2 |
| Top 5 | 2 |
| Top 10 | 2 |
| Retired | 3 |

=== FIA World Drivers' Championship results ===
(key) (Races in bold indicate pole position; races in italics indicate fastest lap)

| Year | Entrant | Chassis | Engine | 1 | 2 | 3 | 4 | 5 | 6 | 7 | 8 | 9 | WDC | Pts |
|---|---|---|---|---|---|---|---|---|---|---|---|---|---|---|
| 1950 | Indianapolis Race Cars | Maserati 8CTF | Maserati 3.0 L8s | GBR | MON | 500; DNQ | SUI | BEL | FRA | ITA | | | NC | 0 |
| 1951 | Central Excavating | Trevis | Offenhauser 4.5 L4 | SUI | 500; 29 | BEL | FRA | GBR | GER | ITA | ESP | | NC | 0 |
| 1952 | Fuel Injection | Kurtis Kraft KK500A | Offenhauser 4.5 L4 | SUI | 500; 17 | BEL | FRA | GBR | GER | NED | ITA | | 22nd | 1 |
| 1953 | Fuel Injection | Kurtis Kraft KK500A | Offenhauser 4.5 L4 | ARG | **500**; 1 | NED | BEL | FRA | GBR | GER | SUI | ITA | 7th | 9 |
| 1954 | Fuel Injection | Kurtis Kraft KK500A | Offenhauser 4.5 L4 | ARG | 500; 1 | BEL | FRA | GBR | GER | SUI | ITA | ESP | 6th | 8 |
| 1955 | Hopkins | Kurtis Kraft KK500C | Offenhauser 4.5 L4 | ARG | MON | 500; 25 | BEL | NED | GBR | ITA | | | 25th | 1 |

== Notes ==
| Preceded by Troy Ruttman | Indianapolis 500 Winner; 1953-1954 | Succeeded by Bob Sweikert |
| Preceded by Manny Ayulo | Formula One fatal accidents May 30, 1955 | Succeeded by Eugenio Castellotti |
