= Five Canyons Open Space =

Park in California, United States

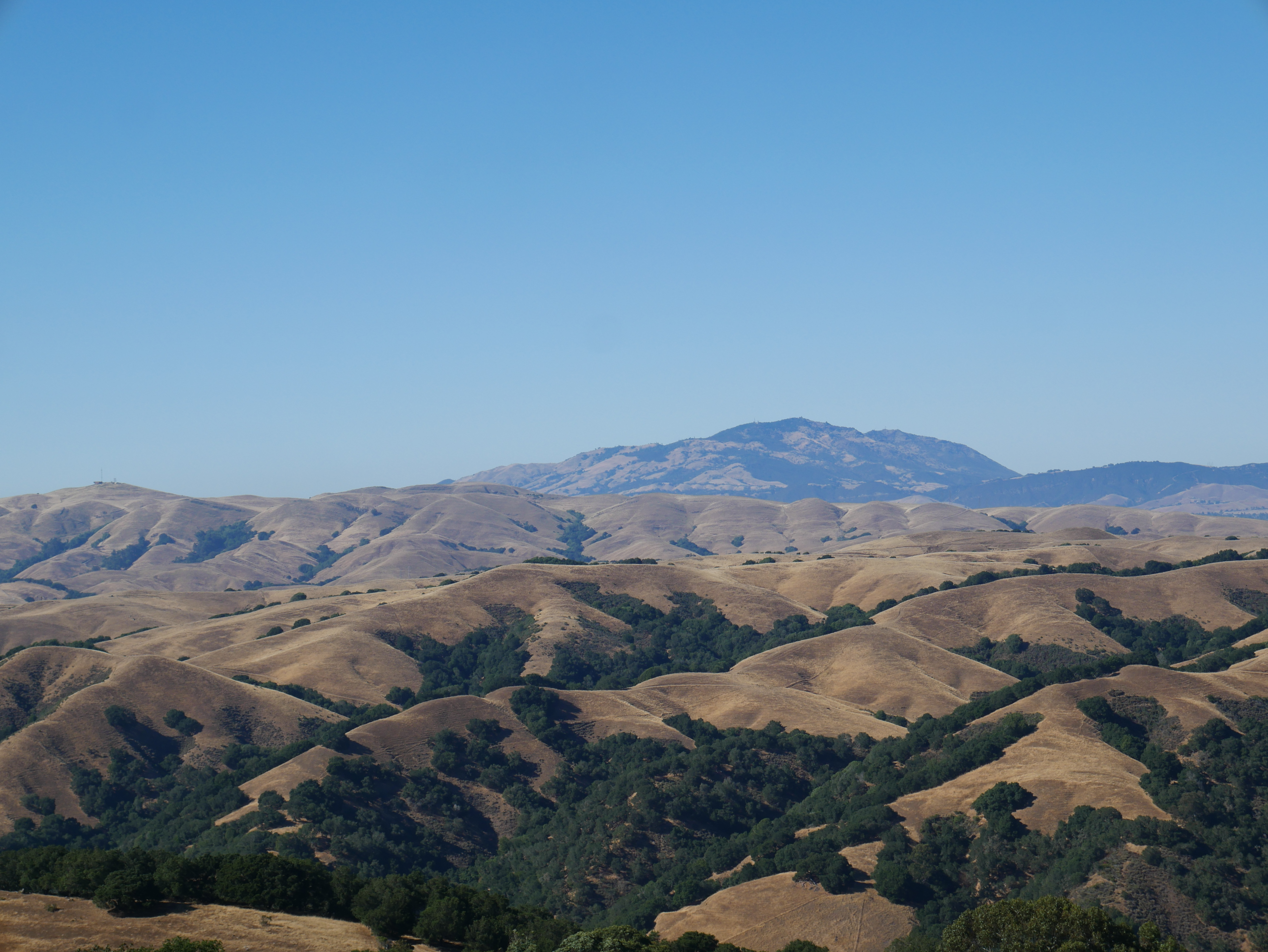

- Location within San Francisco Bay Area Location within California Location within the United States
- Type: Open space
- Location: Alameda County, California
- Nearest city: Hayward, California
- Coordinates: 37.6865°N 122.0285°W
- Area: 300 acres (1.2 km^{2})
- Created: 1998
- Operator: East Bay Regional Park District

Five Canyons Open Space (FCOS) is located in Castro Valley, in Alameda County, California. Five Canyons is a multi-agency collaboration between East Bay Regional Parks District (EBRPD), Alameda County Public Works, Hayward Area Recreation and Parks District (HARD), and several homeowners associations. EBRPD is the lead agency for this open space. FCOS opened in 1998, consists of 300 acres (1.2 km^{2}) and 5 miles (8.0 km) of trails and has almost no amenities. The main visitors are hikers, bicyclists, equestrians and dog walkers. Restrooms and drinking water are available at HARD's nearby Five Canyons Park.

FCOS is open daily from 8:00 AM until dusk. There are no fees for parking or for dogs. There are no wheelchair-accessible facilities, no restrooms, no drinking water, no picnic facilities, and no reservable campgrounds.

The Bay Area Ridge Trail connects FCOS to Cull Canyon Regional Recreation Area to the north and Don Castro Regional Recreation Area to the west. At some future time, the trail will also connect to Garin Regional Park, Dry Creek Regional Park and Mission Peak Regional Preserve.
