= Fairview Fire Protection District =

Special district providing fire and EMS in unincorporated Alameda County, California

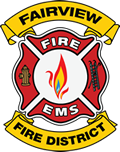

Operational area
- Country: United States
- State: California
- Unincorporated County: Fairview and Castro Valley, Alameda County

Agency overview
- Established: 1938
- Annual calls: 624 (2011)
- Employees: None (services provided by contract)
- Annual budget: $4,880,856 (2025)
- Staffing: Contract (City of Hayward Fire Department)
- Fire chief: (by contract) Hayward Fire Chief

Facilities and equipment
- Battalions: 0 (provided under contract by Hayward)
- Stations: 3 (2 operating within the district, 1 used as a storage station)
- Engines: 5 (1x Type I, 2x Type III, 2x Type VI)
- Trucks: 0 (ladder coverage provided under contract by Hayward)
- Rescues: 1
- Ambulances: 0 (transport provided under contract by Hayward)
- HAZMAT: 0 (handled under contract by Hayward)
- USAR: 0 (contracted by Hayward through FEMA CA-TF4)
- Wildland: 4 (2x Type III, 2x Type VI)
- Light and air: 0 (handled under contract by Hayward as needed)

Website
- www.fairviewfiredistrictca.gov

The Fairview Fire Protection District (FFPD) is an independent special district that provides fire protection, emergency medical, and related services to the unincorporated communities of Fairview and Castro Valley's Five Canyons neighborhood, north and east of Hayward in Alameda County, California, United States. FFPD was established in 1938 and delivers services under a long-standing contract with the City of Hayward Fire Department (HFD).

== Service area ==
FFPD's jurisdiction encompasses approximately 4.2 square miles (11 km^{2}) of unincorporated Alameda County, including the hilly Fairview community and the planned Five Canyons area of Castro Valley. The district's sphere of influence is coterminous with its boundary. A district service map is published by Alameda County's Community Development Agency.

== History ==
Fire protection in Fairview originated with a local district formed in 1938. Prior to 1993, the district operated its own engines with a largely volunteer force and requested mutual aid from Hayward as needed. In 1993, FFPD entered into a contract with the City of Hayward to provide full fire protection and emergency services within the district, a model that continues today and has been periodically renewed and updated.

== Organization and governance ==
FFPD is governed by a five-member Board of Directors elected to four-year terms by district residents.

As of 2025, the five-member elected board of directors consists of:

- President Melissa Dimic
- Vice President Sarah Choi
- Assistant Vice President Vacant (Will be filled by the November 3 election)
- Secretary Mark McDaniel
- Treasurer Michael Justice

The district employs a part-time general manager to administer district affairs, budgeting, and coordination with the City of Hayward. In January 2025, General Manager Mike Preston (former Newark Fire Chief) passed away; the board published an in-memoriam notice and has managed continuity of operations thereafter. On August 1, 2026, the district hired a new general manager, Anthony Kalvans.

== Operations and services ==
Under its service contract, HFD provides the same level of service in FFPD as within the City of Hayward, including fire suppression; advanced life support (ALS) paramedic response; hazardous materials initial response; weed-abatement inspections; fire prevention and plan check; and community preparedness programs such as CERT. Performance metrics in the contract include NFPA 1710 response-time benchmarks, annual inspection coverage for applicable occupancies, and reporting requirements. LAFCO's municipal service review similarly lists services including auto accident rescue, animal rescue, disaster response, and participation in regional and state mutual aid (e.g., Cal OES strike teams). Weed-abatement surveys and a public defensible-space portal are maintained jointly by HFD and FFPD.

== Facilities and apparatus ==
Although the district does not directly employ firefighting staff, it owns facilities and major capital equipment that it makes available to HFD under the contract. District facilities and operating stations associated with Fairview service include:

- Fairview Fire Station (HFD Station 8), 25862 Five Canyons Parkway, Castro Valley – primary station serving the district.
- HFD Station 9, 24912 Second Street, Hayward – additional station serving portions of the district and adjacent areas.
- 24200 Fairview Avenue, Hayward – a district property used for storage/training and capital assets noted in the service contract.

HFD assigns engines and other resources to meet district service levels; the district funds apparatus replacement and facility capital improvements through its capital program.

== Finances ==
FFPD is primarily funded by property taxes collected in the district; additional revenues include interest income and ALS program revenues. In FY 2024–25, total operating expenditures were budgeted at US$4.54 million, including US$3.74 million for the Hayward Fire Department service contract and US$0.51 million for capital commitments (apparatus, equipment, and facility improvements). Prior LAFCO reviews reported district finances as adequate and identified no long-term debt.

== Fire hazard and risk ==
The Fairview–Five Canyons area includes steep, vegetated hillsides within the wildland–urban interface (WUI) and contains areas classified as High and Very High on the State Fire Marshal's Fire Hazard Severity Zone (FHSZ) maps. CAL FIRE updated statewide hazard maps in 2024–2025; Hayward and FFPD provide an online viewer and local briefing materials for the Local Responsibility Area (LRA). In addition to code enforcement and plan review, the district supports community mitigation programs such as defensible-space inspections, chipping, and Firewise projects via its preparedness budget.

== Board meetings and public engagement ==
FFPD holds regular public board meetings (agendas and minutes posted on the district website), publishes an annual budget and independent audit, and coordinates community CERT courses with HFD.

== See also ==
- San Ramon Valley Fire Protection District (nearby fire district)
