= Ed Elisian =

American racing driver (1926–1959)

- Born: Edward Gulbeng Eliseian; December 9, 1926 Oakland, California, U.S.
- Died: August 30, 1959 (aged 32) West Allis, Wisconsin, U.S.

Champ Car career
- 43 races run over 7 years
- Years active: 1953–1959
- Best finish: 15th – 1957
- First race: 1953 Hoosier Hundred (ISF)
- Last race: 1959 Milwaukee 200 (Milwaukee)
| Wins | Podiums | Poles |
|---|---|---|
| 0 | 1 | 1 |

Formula One World Championship career
- Active years: 1954–1958
- Team(s): Stevens, Kurtis Kraft, Watson
- Entries: 5
- Championships: 0
- Wins: 0
- Podiums: 0
- Career points: 0
- Pole positions: 0
- Fastest laps: 0
- First entry: 1954 Indianapolis 500
- Last entry: 1958 Indianapolis 500

Edward Gulbeng Eliseian (December 9, 1926 – August 30, 1959), commonly known as Ed Elisian, was an American racecar driver, mainly competing in the National Championship. He died in a crash at the Milwaukee Mile.

In the 1955 Indianapolis 500, he stopped his car in a futile attempt to help Bill Vukovich when Vukovich's car crashed and burned during the race. He is one of only two drivers in Indy 500 history to stop a non-damaged car to help another driver, the other being Gary Bettenhausen in 1971. He received a sportsmanship award for his efforts, as well as the wrath of the car owner.

In June 1956, Elisian was engaging in a wheel-to-wheel duel with Bob Sweikert, who had won the race in which Vukovich was killed, in a Sprint car race at Salem Speedway when Sweikert made contact with the rail, overleapt it and rolled over outside of the track, suffering fatal skull injuries. Elisian was exonerated as no collision had taken place.

In the 1958 Indianapolis 500, Dick Rathmann and Elisian started the race on the front row, with Jimmy Reece on the outside of the front row. Elisian spun in Turn 3 of the first lap, and collected Rathmann, sending them both into the wall, and starting a 15-car pileup. Pat O'Connor's car hit Reece's car, sailed fifty feet in the air, landed upside down, and burst into flames. Although medical officials said that O'Connor was probably killed instantly from a fractured skull, he was incinerated in the accident, in full view of fans and drivers. Widely blamed for the accident, Elisian was suspended by USAC (reinstated a few days later), and was shunned by the racing community. Rumors spread that Elisian tried to lead the first lap in order to pay gambling debts owed to a syndicate.

In June 1958, Elisian collided with Jim Davis in a Sprint car race at New Bremen Speedway in Auglaize County, Ohio. After Davis had run over one of the wheels of Elisian's spinning car when trying to pass him at the south turn, both cars flipped over and slid down the track. Elisian sustained minor injuries, but Davis, who suffered a skull fracture and chest injuries, died at Memorial Hospital in St. Marys, Ohio. While absolved of blame in the incident, Elisian's unpopularity with drivers deepened.

In September 1958, Elisian was suspended for being charged with passing fraudulent checks among other things, but reinstated as of end of May 1959.

In August 1959, Elisian entered the USAC Indy car 200-mile (320 km) race at the "Milwaukee Mile," - in West Allis, Wisconsin - known in those days as Wisconsin State Fair Park. Driving a metallic green Watson-style roadster owned by Ernie Ruiz, he crashed on lap 29 when he spun in oil from A. J. Foyt's engine. The car hit the wall, rupturing the fuel cell, and rolled over. Some sixty gallons of fuel caught fire, and took over nine minutes to extinguish. The crash claimed the life of Elisian.

== Indianapolis 500 results ==
| Year | Car | Start | Qual | Rank | Finish | Laps | Led | Retired |
|---|---|---|---|---|---|---|---|---|
| 1954 | 27 | 31 | 137.794 | 29 | 18 | 193 | 0 | Flagged |
| 1955 | 68 | 29 | 135.333 | 29 | 30 | 53 | 0 | Stopped BS |
| 1956 | 10 | 14 | 141.382 | 25 | 23 | 160 | 0 | Stalled |
| 1957 | 83 | 7 | 141.777 | 12 | 29 | 51 | 0 | Timing gear |
| 1958 | 5 | 2 | 145.926 | 2 | 28 | 0 | 0 | Crash T3 |
| Totals | | | | | | 457 | 0 | |

| Starts | 5 |
| Poles | 0 |
| Front Row | 1 |
| Wins | 0 |
| Top 5 | 0 |
| Top 10 | 0 |
| Retired | 4 |

== Complete Formula One World Championship results ==
(key)

| Year | Entrant | Chassis | Engine | 1 | 2 | 3 | 4 | 5 | 6 | 7 | 8 | 9 | 10 | 11 | WDC | Points |
|---|---|---|---|---|---|---|---|---|---|---|---|---|---|---|---|---|
| 1954 | H.A. Chapman | Stevens | Offenhauser L4 | ARG | 500; 18 * | BEL | FRA | GBR | GER | SUI | ITA | ESP | | | NC | 0 |
| 1955 | Westwood Gauge / Wales | Kurtis Kraft 4000 | Offenhauser L4 | ARG | MON | 500; 30 | BEL | NED | GBR | ITA | | | | | NC | 0 |
| 1956 | Hoyt Machine / Fred Sommer | Kurtis Kraft 500C | Offenhauser L4 | ARG | MON | 500; 23 † | BEL | FRA | GBR | GER | ITA | | | | NC | 0 |
| 1957 | McNamara / Kalamazoo Sports | Kurtis Kraft 500D | Offenhauser L4 | ARG | MON | 500; 29 | FRA | GBR | GER | PES | ITA | | | | NC | 0 |
| 1958 | John Zink | Watson Indy Roadster | Offenhauser L4 | ARG | MON | NED | 500; 28 | BEL | FRA | GBR | GER | POR | ITA | MOR | NC | 0 |

* Indicates shared drive with Bob Scott.
† Indicates shared drive with Eddie Russo.
