= Don Castro Regional Recreation Area =

Coordinates: 37.692°N 122.05°W

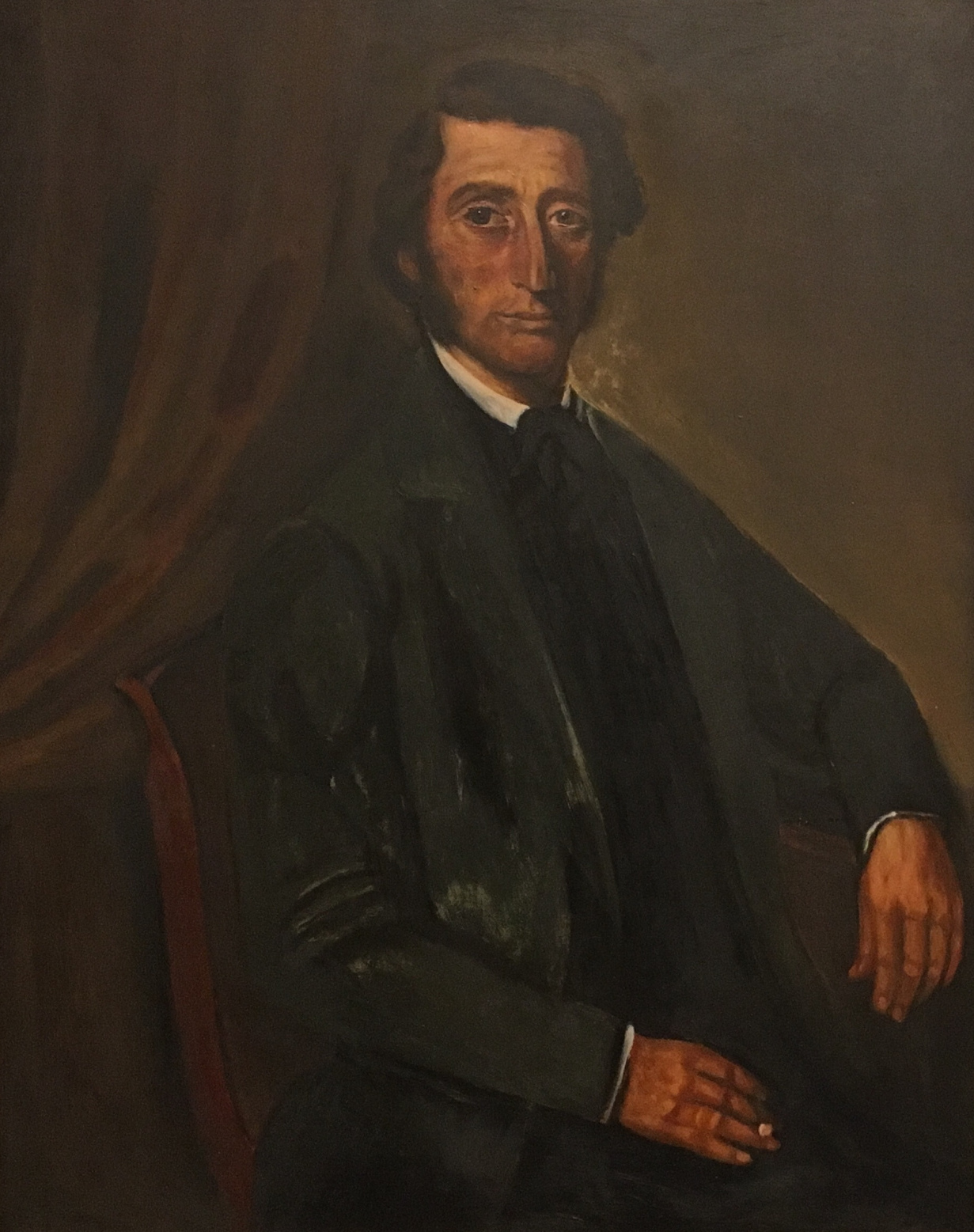
The Don Castro Regional Recreation Area is named after Don Guillermo Castro, a noted Californio ranchero.

Don Castro Regional Recreation Area is a regional park located in Fairview, California. It is part of the East Bay Regional Parks system.
