= Genoa, Colorado =

Town in Colorado, US

- Statutory town
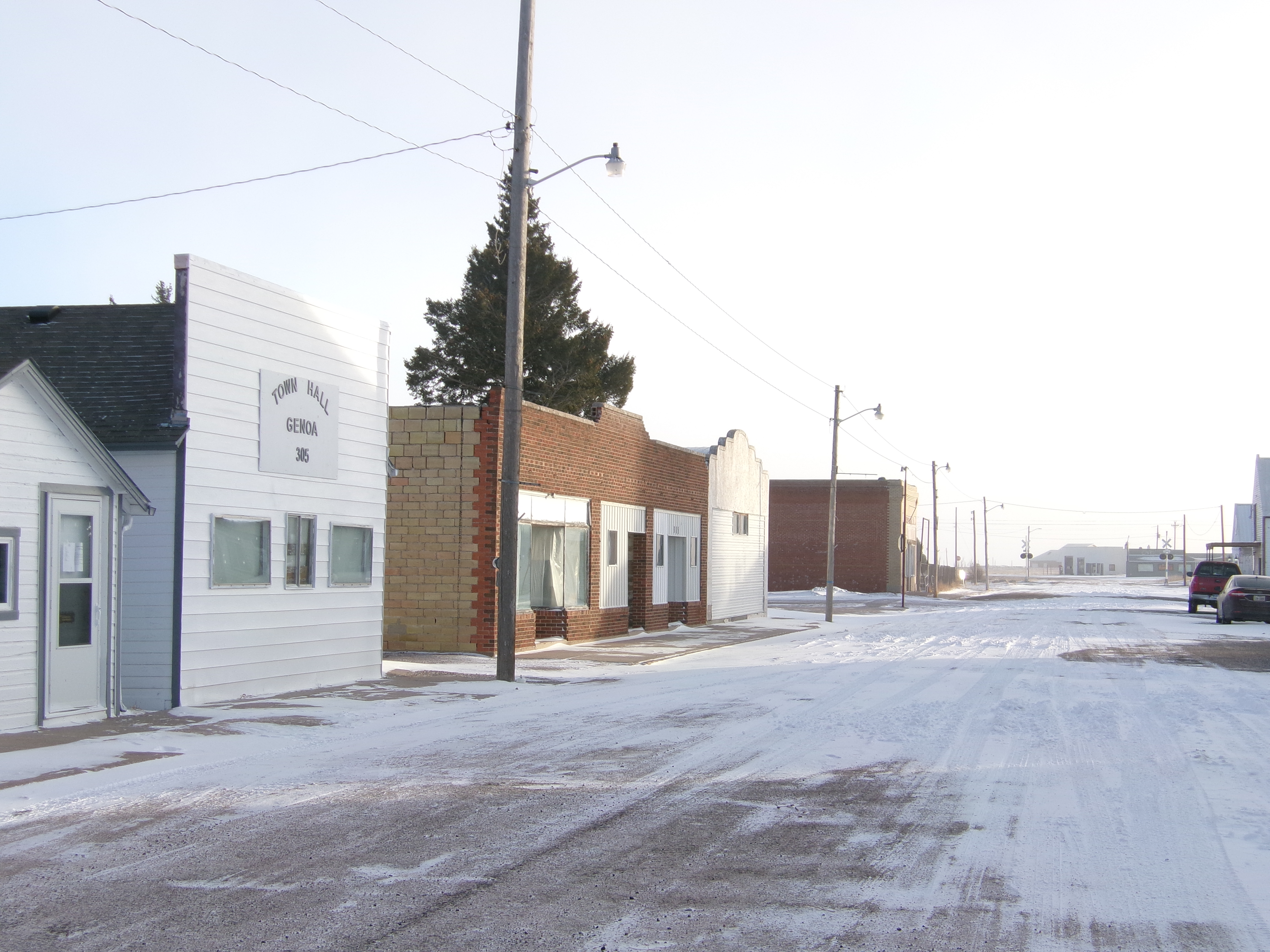
- Genoa main street (2024)

- Location within Lincoln County and Colorado
- Coordinates: 39°16′41″N 103°30′02″W
- Country: United States
- State: Colorado
- County: Lincoln
- Incorporated: July 27, 1905

Area
  - Total: 0.310 sq mi (0.804 km^{2})
  - Land: 0.310 sq mi (0.804 km^{2})
  - Water: 0 sq mi (0.000 km^{2})
- Elevation: 5,604 ft (1,708 m)

Population (2020)
  - Total: 153
  - Density: 493/sq mi (190/km^{2})
- Time zone: UTC−7 (MST)
  - Summer (DST): UTC−6 (MDT)
- ZIP Code: 80818
- Area code: 719
- FIPS code: FIPS 08 29680
- GNIS ID: 2412675
- Website: Town of Genoa

Genoa is a statutory town located in Lincoln County, Colorado, United States. The town population was 153 at the 2020 United States census.

== History ==
A post office called Genoa has been in operation since 1903. The town most likely was named after Genoa, in Italy. Genoa was incorporated as a statutory town in 1905.

== Geography ==
At the 2020 United States census, the town had a total area of 199 acres (0.804 km^{2}), all of it land.

=== Climate ===
According to the Köppen Climate Classification system, Genoa has a cold semi-arid climate, abbreviated "BSk" on climate maps.

Climate data for Genoa, Colorado, 1991–2020 normals, extremes 1970–present
Month	Jan	Feb	Mar	Apr	May	Jun	Jul	Aug	Sep	Oct	Nov	Dec	Year
Record high °F (°C)	70 (21)	76 (24)	79 (26)	85 (29)	96 (36)	102 (39)	101 (38)	100 (38)	98 (37)	90 (32)	79 (26)	70 (21)	102 (39)
Mean maximum °F (°C)	62.7 (17.1)	63.9 (17.7)	73.5 (23.1)	78.9 (26.1)	86.3 (30.2)	94.6 (34.8)	95.8 (35.4)	93.9 (34.4)	91.0 (32.8)	82.6 (28.1)	72.4 (22.4)	63.4 (17.4)	97.2 (36.2)
Mean daily maximum °F (°C)	42.0 (5.6)	42.2 (5.7)	52.2 (11.2)	58.9 (14.9)	68.7 (20.4)	80.0 (26.7)	86.3 (30.2)	83.4 (28.6)	75.8 (24.3)	63.3 (17.4)	50.2 (10.1)	41.3 (5.2)	62.0 (16.7)
Daily mean °F (°C)	31.4 (−0.3)	31.2 (−0.4)	40.3 (4.6)	46.3 (7.9)	56.0 (13.3)	66.6 (19.2)	72.8 (22.7)	70.5 (21.4)	62.8 (17.1)	50.7 (10.4)	39.0 (3.9)	31.1 (−0.5)	49.9 (9.9)
Mean daily minimum °F (°C)	20.7 (−6.3)	20.1 (−6.6)	28.3 (−2.1)	33.6 (0.9)	43.4 (6.3)	53.2 (11.8)	59.3 (15.2)	57.5 (14.2)	49.9 (9.9)	38.2 (3.4)	27.7 (−2.4)	20.9 (−6.2)	37.7 (3.2)
Mean minimum °F (°C)	−0.3 (−17.9)	−1.5 (−18.6)	10.2 (−12.1)	17.9 (−7.8)	28.5 (−1.9)	43.0 (6.1)	51.7 (10.9)	49.0 (9.4)	37.3 (2.9)	20.6 (−6.3)	9.9 (−12.3)	−1.8 (−18.8)	−8.1 (−22.3)
Record low °F (°C)	−20 (−29)	−23 (−31)	−6 (−21)	5 (−15)	17 (−8)	34 (1)	40 (4)	40 (4)	22 (−6)	2 (−17)	−8 (−22)	−12 (−24)	−23 (−31)
Average precipitation inches (mm)	0.34 (8.6)	0.35 (8.9)	0.69 (18)	1.43 (36)	2.38 (60)	2.43 (62)	2.99 (76)	2.96 (75)	1.00 (25)	1.09 (28)	0.34 (8.6)	0.18 (4.6)	16.18 (410.7)
Average snowfall inches (cm)	5.3 (13)	5.0 (13)	5.6 (14)	7.1 (18)	1.1 (2.8)	0.0 (0.0)	0.0 (0.0)	0.0 (0.0)	0.4 (1.0)	2.5 (6.4)	4.5 (11)	3.8 (9.7)	35.3 (88.9)
Average precipitation days (≥ 0.01 in)	2.5	2.9	3.9	6.2	8.8	8.2	8.9	8.7	4.6	4.0	3.0	2.8	64.5
Average snowy days (≥ 0.1 in)	2.9	3.0	2.9	2.5	0.5	0.1	0.0	0.0	0.2	1.1	2.4	2.5	18.1
Source 1: NOAA
Source 2: National Weather Service (mean maxima and minima 2006–2020)

== Demographics ==
Historical population
Census	Pop.	Note	%±
1930	218		—
1940	214		−1.8%
1950	257		20.1%
1960	185		−28.0%
1970	161		−13.0%
1980	165		2.5%
1990	167		1.2%
2000	211		26.3%
2010	139		−34.1%
2020	153		10.1%
U.S. Decennial Census

As of the census of 2000, there were 211 people, 75 households, and 54 families residing in the town. The population density was 592.4 inhabitants per square mile (228.7/km^{2}). There were 84 housing units at an average density of 235.8 units per square mile (91.0 units/km^{2}). The racial makeup of the town was 84.83% White, 7.58% African American, 0.47% Native American, 3.32% from other races, and 3.79% from two or more races. Hispanic or Latino of any race were 4.27% of the population.

There were 75 households, out of which 36.0% had children under the age of 18 living with them, 58.7% were married couples living together, 9.3% had a female householder with no husband present, and 28.0% were non-families. 22.7% of all households were made up of individuals, and 14.7% had someone living alone who was 65 years of age or older. The average household size was 2.81 and the average family size was 3.35.

In the town, the population was spread out, with 35.1% under the age of 18, 7.6% from 18 to 24, 21.8% from 25 to 44, 21.3% from 45 to 64, and 14.2% who were 65 years of age or older. The median age was 33 years. For every 100 females, there were 95.4 males. For every 100 females age 18 and over, there were 90.3 males.

The median income for a household in the town was $27,375, and the median income for a family was $28,750. Males had a median income of $28,750 versus $22,500 for females. The per capita income for the town was $12,443. About 10.4% of families and 20.2% of the population were below the poverty line, including 32.1% of those under the age of eighteen and 25.0% of those 65 or over.

== Attractions ==
World's Wonder View Tower, a tourist trap and roadside attraction.

== See also ==
- List of municipalities in Colorado
