= Lone Tree Cemetery (Fairview, California) =

Cemetery in California, USA

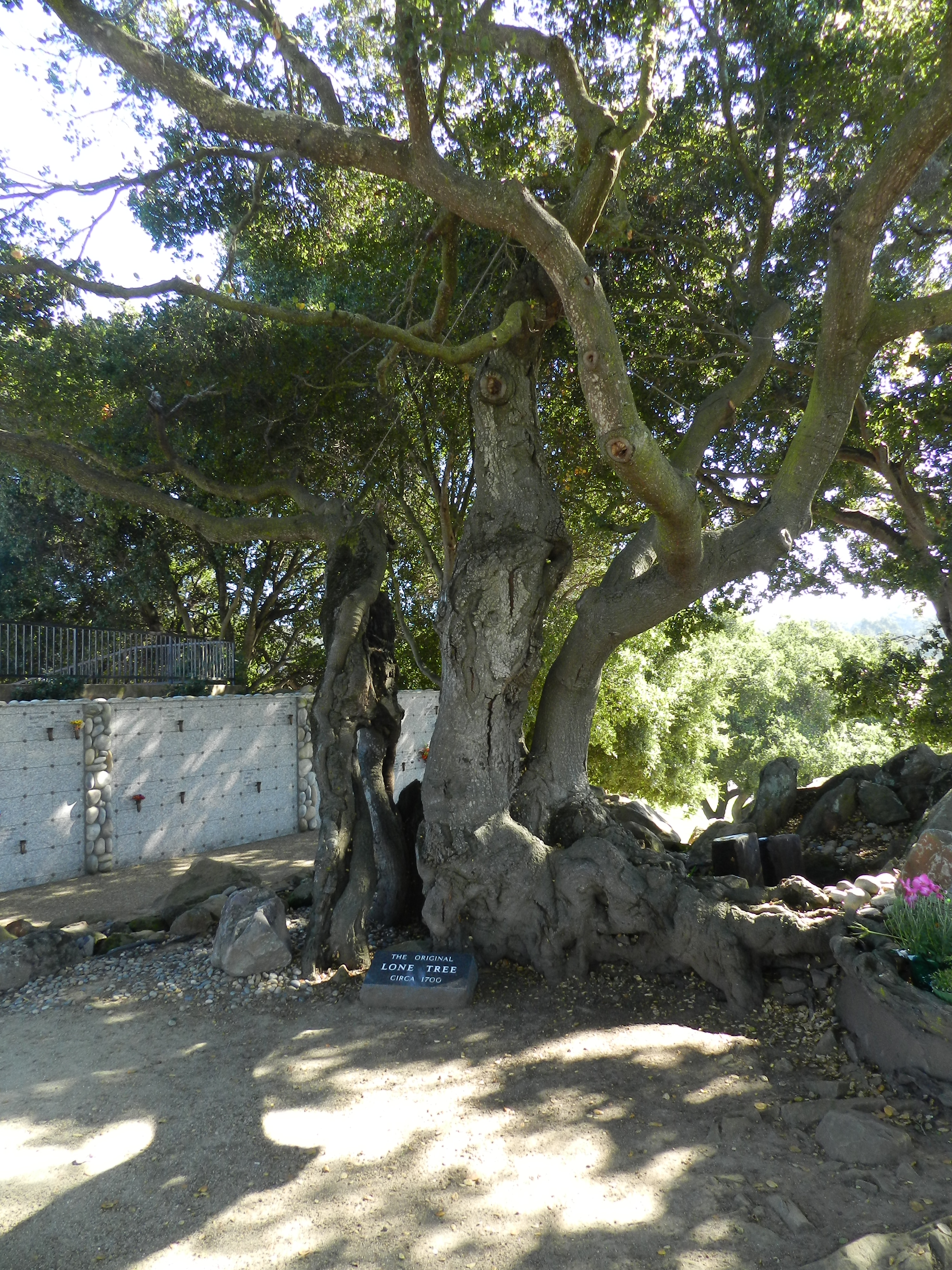
- Original "Lone Tree"
- Interactive map of Lone Tree Cemetery

Details
- Established: 1868
- Location: Hayward, Alameda County, California
- Coordinates: 37°40′29″N 122°02′58″W
- No. of interments: 5,600+
- Website: Official
- Find a Grave: Lone Tree Cemetery

Lone Tree Cemetery is a 42-acre (17 ha), active, nonprofit cemetery, mausoleum and columbarium complex in unincorporated Fairview, California, adjacent to the city of Hayward. The site was first established in 1868. The cemetery has hosted, since 1903, the oldest continuous Memorial Day celebration in southern Alameda County. It contains a memorial to 73 soldiers from Hayward, Castro Valley and San Lorenzo who died in the Vietnam War, and a memorial to Alameda County Sheriff's Deputies and police officers from cities in the county.

== Notable burials ==
- Medal of Honor recipients
  - Robert McDonald (1822–1901), for action in the American Indian Wars with the 5th Infantry Regiment
- Others
  - Charlie Becker (1887–1968), actor who played the "Mayor of Munchkinland" in The Wizard of Oz
  - William Dutton Hayward, namesake of the city of Hayward
  - Bob Sweikert (1926–1956), racing driver, 1955 Indianapolis 500 champion
  - Pete Knight (1903–1937), 1930s rodeo champion (reinterred in 1960 at Greenwood Cemetery in Hot Springs, Arkansas)
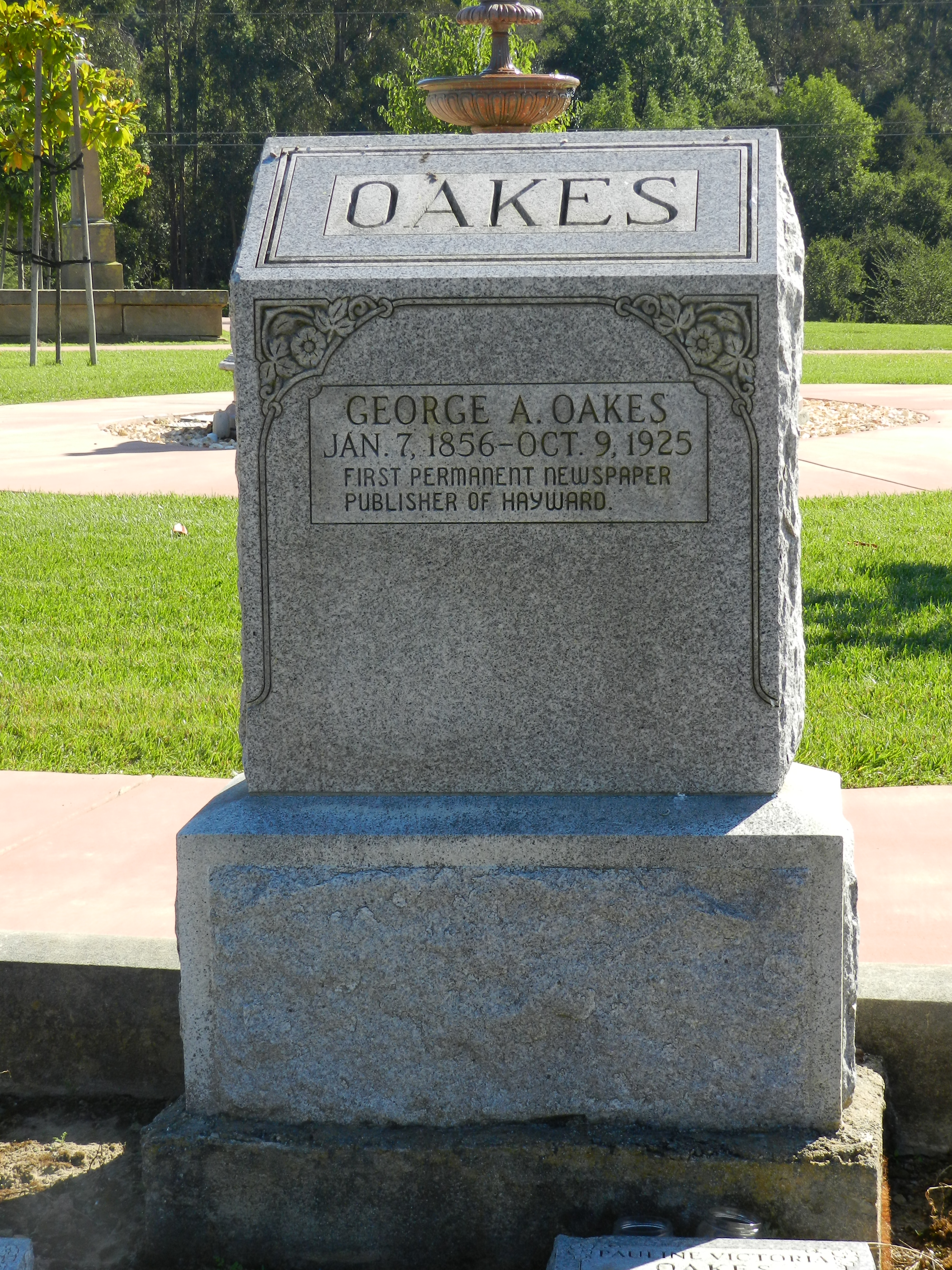
Grave of George Oakes, first newspaper publisher in Hayward

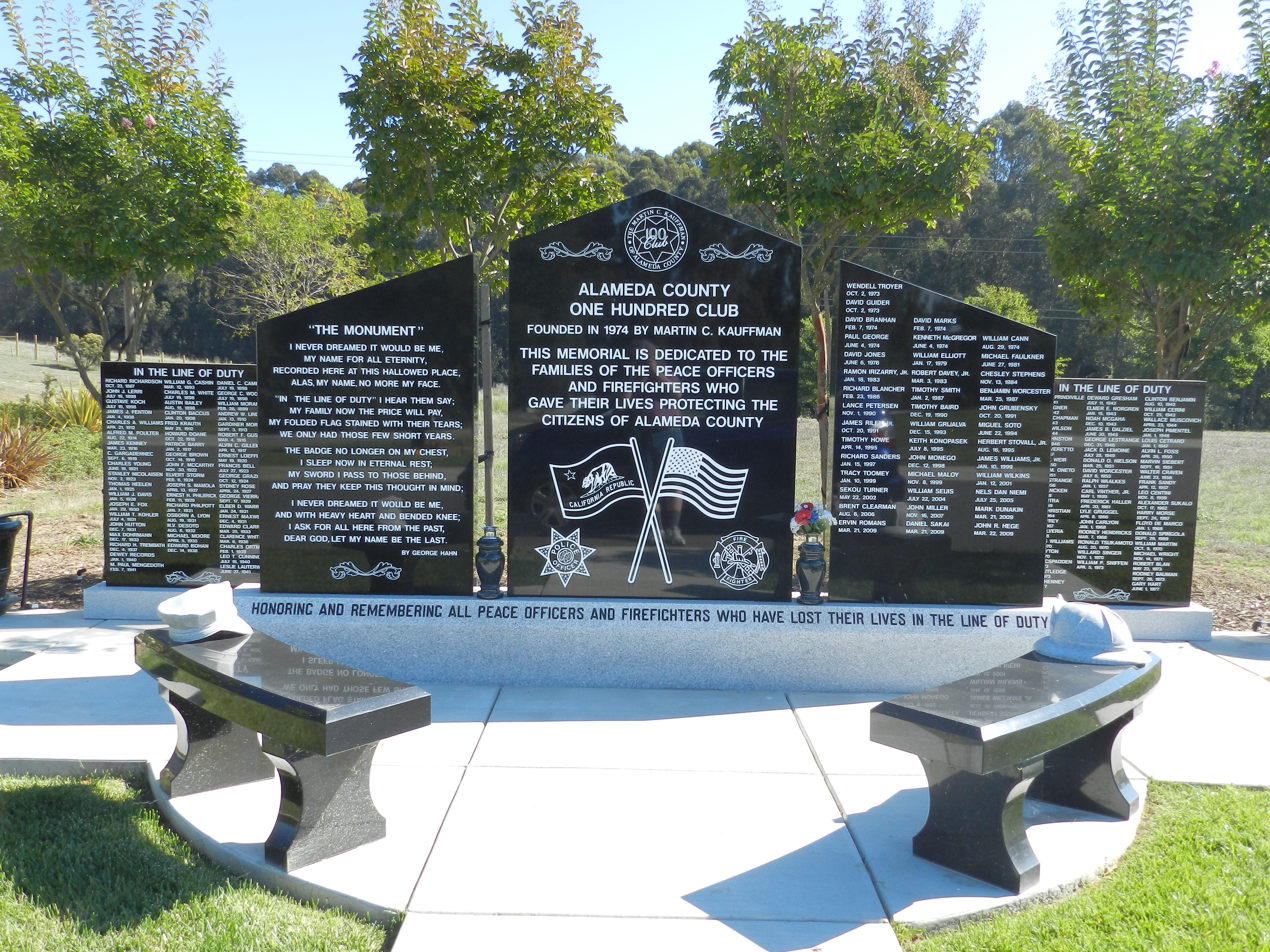
Alameda County police officer memorial

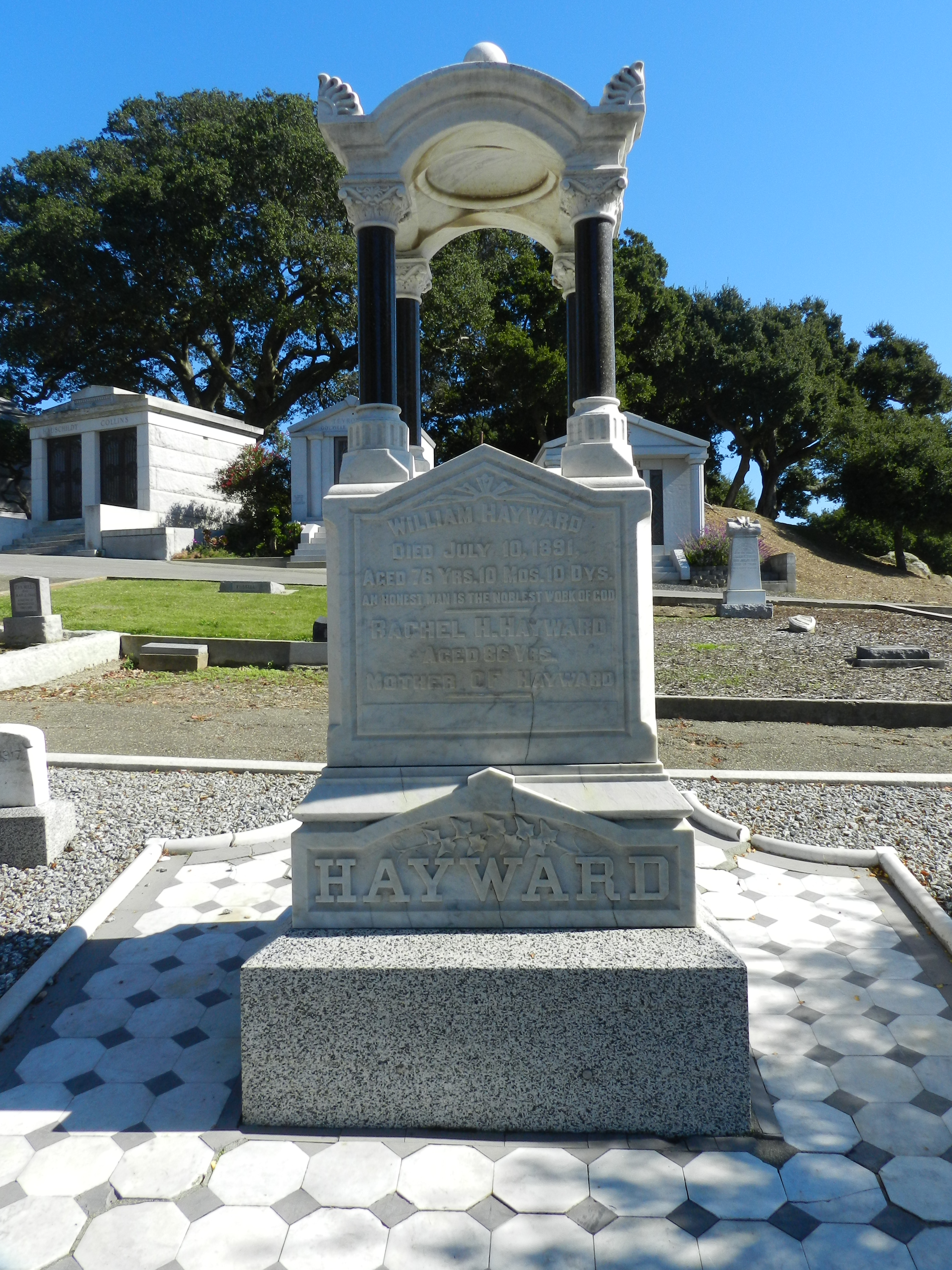
Grave of William Dutton Hayward
