= 1949 AAA Championship Car season =

Sports season

- AAA National Championship Trail

Season
- Races: 14
- Start date: April 24
- End date: November 6

Awards
- National champion: (United States) Johnnie Parsons
- Indianapolis 500 winner: (United States) Bill Holland

The 1949 AAA Championship Car season consisted of 14 races, beginning in Arlington, Texas on April 24 and concluding in Del Mar, California on November 6. There were also two non-championship events. The AAA National Champion was Johnnie Parsons, and the Indianapolis 500 winner was Bill Holland. The season was marred by George Metzler's death at Indianapolis in practice, Bill Sheffler's death at Trenton also in practice, and Rex Mays's death in the final race at Del Mar.

== Schedule and results ==
Rnd	Date	Race name	Track	Location	Type	Pole position	Winning driver
1	April 24	(United States) Arlington 100	Arlington Downs Raceway	Arlington, Texas	Dirt	(United States) Rex Mays	(United States) Johnnie Parsons
2	May 30	(United States) International 500 Mile Sweepstakes	Indianapolis Motor Speedway	Speedway, Indiana	Paved	(United States) Duke Nalon	(United States) Bill Holland
3	June 5	(United States) Milwaukee 100	Wisconsin State Fair Park Speedway	West Allis, Wisconsin	Dirt	(United States) Rex Mays	(United States) Myron Fohr
4	June 19	(United States) Trenton 100	Trenton Speedway	Trenton, New Jersey	Dirt	(United States) Rex Mays	(United States) Myron Fohr
NC	July 17	(United States) Universal Speedways Race of Champions	Arlington Downs Raceway	Arlington, Texas	Dirt	(United States) Mel Hansen	(United States) Mel Hansen
NC	July 31	(United States) Indianapolis Sweepstakes	Williams Grove Speedway	Mechanicsburg, Pennsylvania	Dirt	(United States) Duane Carter	(United States) Johnny Mantz
5	August 20	(United States) Springfield 100	Illinois State Fairgrounds	Springfield, Illinois	Dirt	(United States) Mel Hansen	(United States) Mel Hansen
6	August 28	(United States) Milwaukee 200	Wisconsin State Fair Park Speedway	West Allis, Wisconsin	Dirt	(United States) Mel Hansen	(United States) Johnnie Parsons
7	September 3	(United States) DuQuoin 100	DuQuoin State Fairgrounds	Du Quoin, Illinois	Dirt	(United States) Tony Bettenhausen	(United States) Tony Bettenhausen
8	September 5	(United States) Pikes Peak Auto Hill Climb	Pikes Peak Highway	Pikes Peak, Colorado	Hill	(United States) Al Rogers^{A}	(United States) Al Rogers
9	September 10	(United States) Syracuse 100	Syracuse Mile	Syracuse, New York	Dirt	(United States) Spider Webb	(United States) Johnnie Parsons
10	September 11	(United States) Detroit 100	Michigan State Fairgrounds Speedway	Detroit, Michigan	Dirt	(United States) Duke Dinsmore	(United States) Tony Bettenhausen
11	September 25	(United States) Springfield 100	Illinois State Fairgrounds	Springfield, Illinois	Dirt	(United States) Jimmy Davies	(United States) Johnnie Parsons
12	October 16	(United States) Langhorne 100	Langhorne Speedway	Langhorne, Pennsylvania	Dirt	(United States) Paul Russo	(United States) Johnnie Parsons
13	October 30	(United States) Golden State 100	California State Fairgrounds	Sacramento, California	Dirt	(United States) Fred Agabashian	(United States) Fred Agabashian
14	November 6	(United States) Del Mar 100	Del Mar Speedway	Del Mar, California	Dirt	(United States) Jimmy Davies	(United States) Jimmy Davies

Paved/dirt oval
Road course/hill climb
Non-championship race

^A No pole is awarded for the Pikes Peak Hill Climb, in this schedule on the pole is the driver who started first. No lap led was awarded for the Pikes Peak Hill Climb; however, a lap was awarded to the drivers who completed the climb.

== Final points standings ==
Note: The points became the car, when not only one driver led the car, the relieved driver became small part of the points. Points for driver method: (the points for the finish place) / (number the lap when completed the car) * (number the lap when completed the driver)

Pos	Driver	ARD (United States)	INDY (United States)	MIL1 (United States)	TRE (United States)	SPR1 (United States)	MIL2 (United States)	DQSF (United States)	PIK (United States)	SYR (United States)	MSF (United States)	SPR2 (United States)	LHS (United States)	CSF (United States)	DMR (United States)	Pts
1	(United States) Johnnie Parsons	1	2	13	11	3	1	11		1	12	1	1	5	15	2280
2	(United States) Myron Fohr	4	4	1	1	6	10	8		6	3	DNS		4	3	1790
3	(United States) Bill Holland		1	9	16	4		2		DNP	7	12	9	13		1420
4	(United States) Walt Brown		DNS	10	3	7	2	5		4	8	5	11	6	6	1281
5	(United States) George Connor		3	16	DNQ	16	7	3		5	13	6		11	9	1200
6	(United States) Rex Mays	**2**	25	**7**	**10**	2	3	15		15	11	2		2	18	1030
7	(United States) Paul Russo		8	6	8	10	12	6		2	DNQ	15	**4**	10	5	920
8	(United States) Lee Wallard		23		15	5	21	4		16	5	3	6	7	2	760
9	(United States) Johnny Mantz	3	7	5	12	8	17			11	DNQ			DNS	8	660
10	(United States) Emil Andres		9	2	4	DNP	5	13		10		DNQ				512
11	(United States) Joie Chitwood		5													500
12	(United States) Tony Bettenhausen		DNQ	DNQ		18	15	**1**		9	1	9		DNQ	16	466
13	(United States) Mack Hellings		16	3	9				5					9	4	440
14	(United States) Jimmy Jackson		6						DNS							400
15	(United States) Mel Hansen		DNS	DNS	2	**1**	**16**	14		DNQ						376
16	(United States) Duane Carter		14	DNQ		15	6	9		7	14	7		16	10	350
17	(United States) Jimmy Davies RY	10								8	6	**13**	16	DNQ	**1**	330
18	(United States) Spider Webb		33	DNP						**3**	2	10		DNQ		330
19	(United States) Ralph Pratt R		DNQ	12		9	8	7			4					330
20	(United States) Duke Dinsmore		15	DNP	5	DNQ	DNS	DNQ		DNQ	**10**	DNQ	13	14	DNQ	254
21	(United States) Troy Ruttman R	8	12	18										3	12	250
22	(United States) Neal Carter R						11	17			9	11	2		14	240
23	(United States) Bayliss Levrett R	9	24	14		17	4	18			DNQ	16		8	17	206
24	(United States) Fred Agabashian		27											**1**		200
25	(United States) Al Rogers								**1**							200
26	(United States) Charles Van Acker		31	DNQ		11	9	10		DNQ	DNQ	8				180
27	(United States) Louis Unser								2							160
28	(United States) Norm Houser		10	DNQ	DNQ											150
29	(United States) Johnny Fedricks R										DNQ	14	3			140
30	(United States) Charles Bryant R								3							140
31	(United States) Mike Salay		DNQ		6		DNQ				DNQ	DNS	8			130
32	(United States) Johnny McDowell R	7	18	11	7											124
33	(United States) Jackie Holmes		22	4		14	18	DNQ								120
34	(United States) Chuck Stevenson R						14					4				120
35	(United States) George Hammond								4							120
36	(United States) Milt Fankhouser	6	DNQ	DNQ	DNQ	DNQ	DNQ	DNQ		14	16	DNQ	10	12	13	120
37	(United States) Tommy Hinnershitz		DNQ							DNS			5			117
38	(United States) Frank Burany R	5	DNQ													100
39	(United States) Jim Rathmann R		11												DNQ	100
40	(United States) Phil Shafer								6							80
41	(United States) George Fonder R		20							17			7			60
42	(United States) Cal Niday R													18	7	60
43	(United States) Hugh Thomas								7							60
44	(United States) Jack McGrath		26	8	14											50
45	(United States) J.C. Shoemaker								8							50
46	(United States) Russ Snowberger								9							40
47	(United States) Herb Bryers								10							30
48	(United States) Buster Hammond								11							20
49	(United States) Hank Rogers					12	20			12			DNQ			20
50	(United States) Billy McGee R														DNS	17
51	(United States) Ottis Stine									DNS			14			14
52	(United States) Mark Light									18			12			10
53	(United States) Billy Devore		DNQ					12				DNQ				10
54	(United States) Walt Killinger								12							10
55	(United States) Hal Cole		19	DNQ	17									15	11	3
-	(United States) Bill Sheffler	11	17	15	DNQ											0
-	(United States) George Lynch		32			DNQ	13	16		DNP	15	18	15			0
-	(United States) Ted Duncan		DNQ	17	13	DNQ	19	DNP								0
-	(United States) Buster Warke			DNQ	18					13	DNQ		DNQ			0
-	(United States) Wally Stokes R		DNQ			13										0
-	(United States) Mauri Rose		13													0
-	(United States) Art McKee R								13							0
-	(United States) Milton Mabe R								14							0
-	(United States) Art Hillis								15							0
-	(United States) Glenn Harrison R								16							0
-	(United States) Hal Robson		DNQ								DNQ	17				0
-	(United States) Dick Rathmann R			DNQ										17		0
-	(United States) Delmar Desch								17							0
-	(United States) Ed Terry												17			0
-	(United States) Lloyd Axel R								18							0
-	(United States) Johnny Mauro		DNQ						19							0
-	(United States) Jimmy Good								20							0
-	(United States) William Cantrell		21	DNQ												0
-	(United States) Kenny Eaton R		DNQ				22									0
-	(United States) Manuel Ayulo		28													0
-	(United States) Duke Nalon		**29**													0
-	(United States) Sam Hanks		30	DNQ			DNQ	DNQ						DNQ	DNP	0
-	(United States) Joel Thorne		DNQ						DNS							0
-	(United States) Walt Von Tilius								DNS							0
-	(United States) Jim Hammond								DNS							0
-	(United States) Norman Robinson								DNS							0
-	(United States) Wayne Sankey								DNS							0
-	(United States) Buddy Shay								DNS							0
-	(United States) Jimmy Daywalt		DNQ				DNQ	DNQ				DNQ				0
-	(United States) Steve Truchan						DNQ	DNQ			DNQ	DNQ				0
-	(United States) Eddie Haddad		DNQ			DNQ	DNQ									0
-	(United States) Henry Banks		DNQ								DNQ	DNQ				0
-	(United States) Eddie Zalucki						DNQ	DNQ		DNP						0
-	(United States) Danny Kladis		DNQ	DNQ												0
-	(United States) Bill Boyd						DNP			DNQ						0
-	(United States) Les Anderson		DNQ													0
-	(United States) Frank Beardsley		DNQ													0
-	(United States) Randall Beinke		DNQ													0
-	(United States) Lindley Bothwell		DNQ													0
-	(United States) Frank Brisko		DNQ													0
-	(United States) Jim Brubaker		DNQ													0
-	(United States) Pat Flaherty		DNQ													0
-	(United States) Dick Fraizer		DNQ													0
-	(United States) Byron Horne		DNQ													0
-	(United States) Tommy Mattson		DNQ													0
-	(United States) George Metzler		DNQ													0
-	(United States) Chet Miller		DNQ													0
-	(United States) Bill Taylor		DNQ													0
-	(United States) Louis Tomei		DNQ													0
-	(United States) Doc Williams		DNQ													0
-	(United States) Bill Mackey					DNQ										0
-	(United States) Charles Szekendy					DNQ										0
-	(United States) George Weaver									DNQ						0
-	(United States) Bob Simpson										DNQ					0
-	(United States) Iggy Katona											DNQ				0
-	(United States) Eddie Johnson												DNQ			0
-	(United States) Johnny Smith													DNQ		0
-	(United States) Walt Faulkner														DNQ	0
-	(United States) Dempsey Wilson														DNQ	0
-	(United States) Bill Gouse									DNP						0
-	(United States) Joe Garson														DNP	0
-	(United States) Lenny Lowe														DNP	0
Pos	Driver	ARD (United States)	INDY (United States)	MIL1 (United States)	TRE (United States)	SPR1 (United States)	MIL2 (United States)	DQSF (United States)	PIK (United States)	SYR (United States)	MSF (United States)	SPR2 (United States)	LHS (United States)	CSF (United States)	DMR (United States)	Pts

Color	Result
Gold	Winner
Silver	2nd place
Bronze	3rd place
Green	4th & 5th place
Light Blue	6th-10th place
Dark Blue	Finished (outside top 10)
Purple	Did not finish (ret.)
Red	Did not qualify (DNQ)
Brown	Withdrawn (Wth)
Black	Disqualified (DSQ)
White	Did not start (DNS)
Blank	Did not participate (DNP)
Blank	Not competing

**In-line notation**
**Bold**	Pole position
Italics	Ran fastest race lap
*	Led most race laps
RY Rookie of the Year
R Rookie

== See also ==
- 1949 Indianapolis 500
