= 1948 AAA Championship Car season =

Sports season

- AAA National Championship Trail

Season
- Races: 12
- Start date: April 25
- End date: October 10

Awards
- National champion: (United States) Ted Horn
- Indianapolis 500 winner: (United States) Mauri Rose

The 1948 AAA Championship Car season consisted of 12 races, beginning in Arlington, Texas on April 25 and concluding in Du Quoin, Illinois on October 10. The AAA National Champion was Ted Horn, and the Indianapolis 500 winner was Mauri Rose. Ralph Hepburn was killed at Indianapolis in practice, and Ted Horn was killed at the last race in DuQuoin.

== Schedule and results ==
Rnd	Date	Race name	Track	Location	Type	Pole position	Winning driver
1	April 25	(United States) H. H. Wheler Memorial Cup	Arlington Downs Raceway	Arlington, Texas	Dirt	(United States) Paul Russo	(United States) Ted Horn
2	May 31	(United States) International 500 Mile Sweepstakes	Indianapolis Motor Speedway	Speedway, Indiana	Paved	(United States) Rex Mays	(United States) Mauri Rose
3	June 6	(United States) Milwaukee 100	Wisconsin State Fair Park Speedway	West Allis, Wisconsin	Dirt	(United States) Johnny Mantz	(United States) Emil Andres
4	June 20	(United States) National Convention Sweepstakes	Langhorne Speedway	Langhorne, Pennsylvania	Dirt	(United States) Tony Bettenhausen	(United States) Walt Brown
5	August 15	(United States) Milwaukee 100	Wisconsin State Fair Park Speedway	West Allis, Wisconsin	Dirt	(United States) Myron Fohr	(United States) Johnny Mantz
6	August 21	(United States) Springfield 100	Illinois State Fairgrounds	Springfield, Illinois	Dirt	(United States) Myron Fohr	(United States) Ted Horn
7	August 29	(United States) Milwaukee 200	Wisconsin State Fair Park Speedway	West Allis, Wisconsin	Dirt	(United States) Paul Russo	(United States) Myron Fohr
7	August 29	(United States) Milwaukee 200	Wisconsin State Fair Park Speedway	West Allis, Wisconsin	Dirt	(United States) Paul Russo	(United States) Tony Bettenhausen^{A}
8	September 4	(United States) DuQuoin 100	DuQuoin State Fairgrounds	Du Quoin, Illinois	Dirt	(United States) Rex Mays	(United States) Lee Wallard
9	September 6	(United States) Atlanta 100	Lakewood Speedway	Atlanta, Georgia	Dirt	(United States) Ted Horn	(United States) Mel Hansen
10	September 6	(United States) Pikes Peak Auto Hill Climb	Pikes Peak Highway	Pikes Peak, Colorado	Hill	(United States) Al Rogers^{B}	(United States) Al Rogers
11	September 19	(United States) Springfield 100	Illinois State Fairgrounds	Springfield, Illinois	Dirt	(United States) Lee Wallard	(United States) Myron Fohr
12	October 10	(United States) DuQuoin 100	DuQuoin State Fairgrounds	Du Quoin, Illinois	Dirt	(United States) Rex Mays	(United States) Johnnie Parsons

Paved/Dirt Oval
Road Course/Hill Climb

^A Both Bettenhausen and Fohr were credited with wins for the race as Bettenhausen relieved Fohr on Lap 118 of 200.
^B No pole is awarded for the Pikes Peak Hill Climb, in this schedule on the pole is the driver who started first. No lap led was awarded for the Pikes Peak Hill Climb, however, a lap was awarded to the drivers that completed the climb.

== Final points standings ==
Note: The points became the car, when not only one driver led the car, the relieved driver became small part of the points. Points for driver method: (the points for the finish place) / (number the lap when completed the car) * (number the lap when completed the driver)

Pos	Driver	ARD (United States)	INDY (United States)	MIL1 (United States)	LHS (United States)	MIL2 (United States)	SPR1 (United States)	MIL3 (United States)	DQSF1 (United States)	LAK (United States)	PIK (United States)	SPR2 (United States)	DQSF2 (United States)	Pts
1	(United States) Ted Horn	1	4	3	9	3	1	3	3	**12**		3	17	1880
2	(United States) Myron Fohr		DNQ	4	DNS	**7**	**3**	1	2	2		1	4	1159
3	(United States) Mauri Rose		1											1000
4	(United States) Bill Sheffler	17	18	8	8	10	7	5	5	3		4	3	924.8
5	(United States) Duke Nalon	3	3	11	DNP	8	17	DNQ		DNP				910
6	(United States) Lee Wallard		7		6	5	20	11	1	8		**6**	9	865.5
7	(United States) Bill Holland	DNS	2	9	11	DNQ								840
8	(United States) Mack Hellings RY		5	2	2	14	19							820
9	(United States) Emil Andres	DNP	31	1	3	2	18	16	8	5		2	13	810
10	(United States) Charles Van Acker		11	5	7	9	5	6	4	9		12	10	760
11	(United States) Johnnie Parsons R		DNQ				2	2	11			13	1	700
12	(United States) Hal Cole		6	6	DNQ								5	580
13	(United States) Rex Mays	16	**19**	17	16	4	4	7	**17**	10		14	**18**	360
14	(United States) Johnny Mauro		8								3			355
15	(United States) Tony Bettenhausen		14	15	**15**	6	6	1	10					324
16	(United States) Walt Brown	DNQ	DNQ	13	1	13	8	12				8		320
17	(United States) Paul Russo	**7**	32	18	18			**9**	18	11		15	2	300
18	(United States) Johnny Mantz R		13	**12**	13	1	9	13				9	16	290
19	(United States) George Connor		28	DNQ	5	DNQ	11	17				5	DNQ	287
20	(United States) Hal Robson		15	DNQ		12	10	14	6	4		DNS	14	269
21	(United States) Ted Duncan R							4				17		240
22	(United States) Mel Hansen		25	14	DNS	18	16	15	16	1		11	11	220
23	(United States) Eddie Zalucki	DNQ	DNQ	DNQ		15		DNS				7	6	216
24	(United States) Al Rogers		DNQ	DNQ							**1**			200
25	(United States) Tommy Hinnershitz		9											200
26	(United States) Duke Dinsmore	2		16					13				15	172.5
27	(United States) Johnny Byrne	6					12	18	DNQ	6		DNQ	DNQ	170
28	(United States) Herb Bryers R										2			160
29	(United States) Jimmy Jackson		10											150
30	(United States) Joie Chitwood	4	17	DNQ	DNP									120
31	(United States) Duane Carter R		22		4									120
32	(United States) Russ Snowberger										4			120
33	(United States) Spider Webb		27	10	14	17	13	10	DNQ	DNQ		10		116
34	(United States) Manuel Ayulo R	5	DNQ	DNQ										100
35	(United States) Buster Hammond										5			100
36	(United States) Floyd Davis								9	7				87.5
37	(United States) Hugh Thomas										6			80
38	(United States) Ken Fowler		DNS			16	DNQ	8				DNQ	8	74
39	(United States) George Lynch R		DNQ			19		19	15				7	60
40	(United States) William Cantrell R		16						7					60
41	(United States) Johnny Shackleford		DNS	7										60
42	(United States) Louis Unser										7			60
43	(United States) Mike Salay R	8	30		17		15	DNQ				16	12	50
44	(United States) J.C. Shoemaker										8			50
45	(United States) Billy Devore	14	12											50
46	(United States) Wayne Sankey R										9			40
47	(United States) Louis Durant		DNS											35
48	(United States) Red Hodges R	10												30
49	(United States) Delmar Desch										10			30
50	(United States) Jackie Holmes		DNQ	DNQ		11	14					DNQ		20
51	(United States) Walt Killinger										11			20
52	(United States) Charlie Rogers	12			DNQ	DNS			12			DNQ		10
53	(United States) Art Hillis										12			10
54	(United States) Jack McGrath R	9	21		DNQ									5.2
-	(United States) Walt Ader		DNQ		10									0
-	(United States) Les Anderson	11	24	DNQ										0
-	(United States) Buster Warke			DNQ	12									0
-	(United States) Henry Banks	13	DNQ											0
-	(United States) George Hammond										13			0
-	(United States) Steve Truchan	15		DNQ				21	14			18	DNQ	0
-	(United States) Jimmy Good R										14			0
-	(United States) Bill Milliken										15			0
-	(United States) Chet Miller		20											0
-	(United States) Fred Agabashian		23											0
-	(United States) Sam Hanks		26											0
-	(United States) Doc Williams		29											0
-	(United States) Harry McQuinn		33											0
-	(United States) Joel Thorne		DNQ								DNS			0
-	(United States) Cliff Bergere		DNS											0
-	(United States) Louis Tomei		DNS											0
-	(United States) Keith Andrews										DNS			0
-	(United States) Russ Chabot										DNS			0
-	(United States) Milt Fankhauser		DNQ	DNQ										0
-	(United States) Red Byron		DNQ		DNQ									0
-	(United States) Paul Craver			DNQ			DNQ							0
-	(United States) Johnny McDowell					DNQ		DNQ						0
-	(United States) Johnny Dietz					DNQ							DNQ	0
-	(United States) Jim Brubaker		DNQ											0
-	(United States) Bob Droeger		DNQ											0
-	(United States) Roland Free		DNQ											0
-	(United States) Andy Granatelli		DNQ											0
-	(United States) Art Hartsfeld		DNQ											0
-	(United States) Ralph Hepburn		DNQ											0
-	(United States) Ronney Householder		DNQ											0
-	(United States) George Metzler		DNQ											0
-	(United States) Al Miller		DNQ											0
-	(United States) Cowboy O'Rourke		DNQ											0
-	(United States) Joe Perkins		DNQ											0
-	(United States) Ralph Pratt		DNQ											0
-	(United States) Pete Romcevich		DNQ											0
-	(United States) Loral Tansy		DNQ											0
-	(United States) Jerry Kubik			DNQ										0
-	(United States) Chick Barbo				DNQ									0
-	(United States) Orville Epperley				DNQ									0
-	(United States) Bob Baity									DNQ				0
-	(United States) Norm Houser												DNQ	0
Pos	Driver	ARD (United States)	INDY (United States)	MIL1 (United States)	LHS (United States)	MIL2 (United States)	SPR1 (United States)	MIL3 (United States)	DQSF1 (United States)	LAK (United States)	PIK (United States)	SPR2 (United States)	DQSF2 (United States)	Pts

Color	Result
Gold	Winner
Silver	2nd place
Bronze	3rd place
Green	4th & 5th place
Light Blue	6th-10th place
Dark Blue	Finished (Outside Top 10)
Purple	Did not finish (Ret)
Red	Did not qualify (DNQ)
Brown	Withdrawn (Wth)
Black	Disqualified (DSQ)
White	Did not start (DNS)
Blank	Did not participate (DNP)
Blank	Not competing

**In-line notation**
**Bold**	Pole position
Italics	Ran fastest race lap
*	Led most race laps
RY Rookie of the Year
R Rookie

== See also ==
- 1948 Indianapolis 500
