= 1947 Indianapolis 500 =

American motor race

31st Indianapolis 500
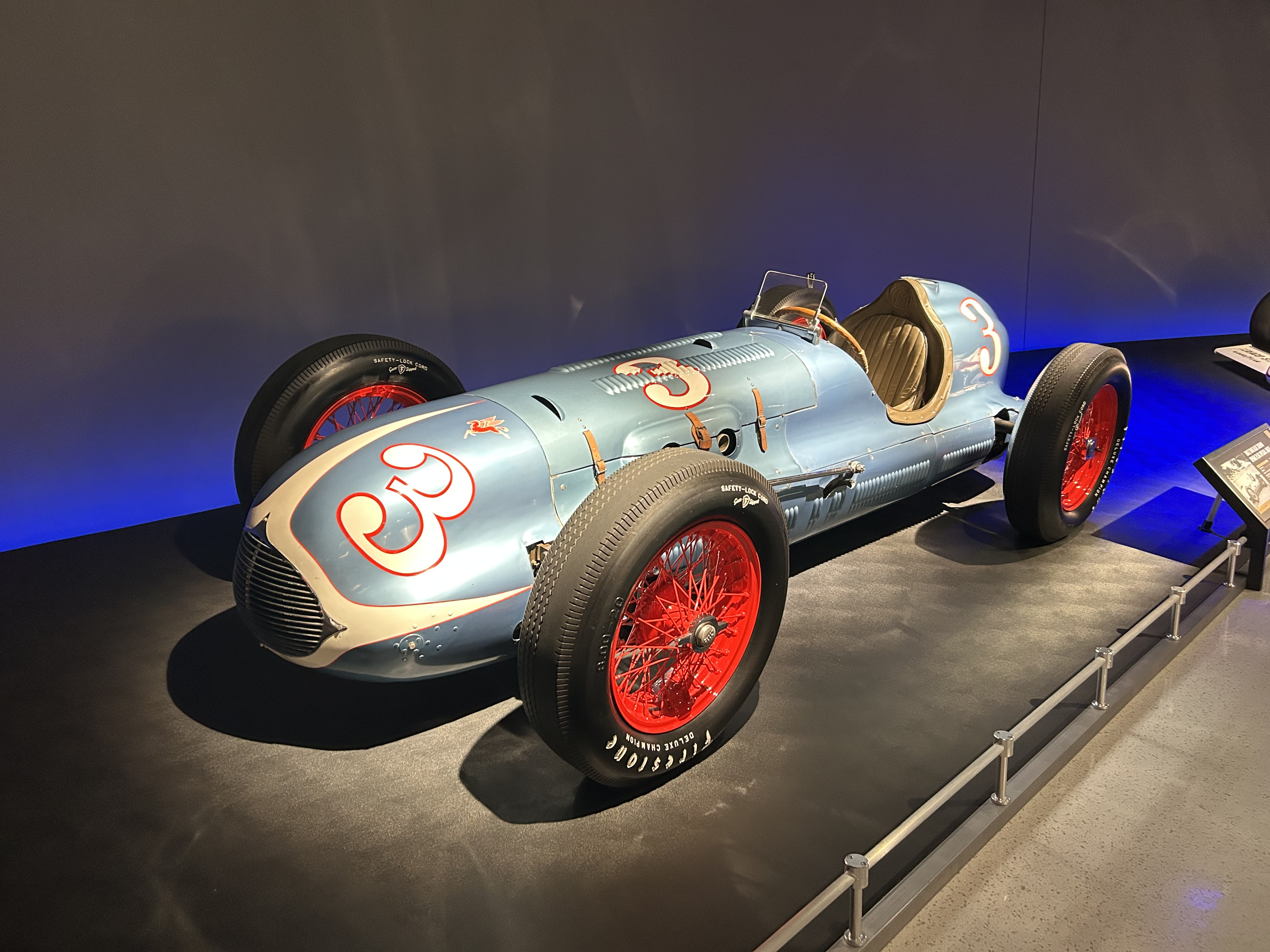

Indianapolis Motor Speedway

Indianapolis 500
- Sanctioning body: AAA
- Date: May 30, 1947
- Winner: Mauri Rose
- Winning Entrant: Lou Moore
- Winning Chief Mechanic: Lou Moore
- Winning time: 4:17:52.17
- Average speed: 116.338 mph (187.228 km/h)
- Pole position: Ted Horn
- Pole speed: 126.564 mph (203.685 km/h)
- Most laps led: Bill Holland (143)

Pre-race
- Pace car: Nash Ambassador
- Pace car driver: George W. Mason
- Starter: Seth Klein
- Honorary referee: Ralph F. Gates
- Estimated attendance: 165,000

Chronology
Previous	Next
1946	1948

The 31st International 500-Mile Sweepstakes was held at Indianapolis Motor Speedway on Friday, May 30, 1947. It was the opening round of the 11 races that comprised the 1947 AAA Championship Car season. The 1946 winner, George Robson, had been killed on September 2, 1946 in a racing incident. Driver Shorty Cantlon would be killed in an accident during the race.

Beginning in 1947 the Speedway issued "Bronze" and "Silver" badges. Bronze badges allowed gate and garage access during the month and silver badges did the same but also allowed pit access. On race day, one needed a Back Up Card. Early bronze badges were indeed bronze, but silver badges were only a silver colored pot metal. Bronze badges began being made of a bronze colored pot metal sometime in the late 1950s or early 1960s.

== Time trials & ASPAR boycott ==
Time trials was scheduled for five days. The minimum speed to qualify was set at 115 mph. In the months leading up to the race, several top drivers that were members of a union, the American Society of Professional Auto Racing (ASPAR), threatened to boycott the race over the purse size. The AAA Contest Board refused to heed their demands, and when the entry list was closed on May 8, many of the top drivers, particularly several popular west coast drivers, were not on the list. A total of 35 cars were entered, but at least nine had no driver listed, and 13 of the entries were inexperienced novice drivers. After the practice began for the month, officials decreed that the boycotting drivers would not be allowed late entry. After several weeks of dispute, an agreement was made for the ASPAR drivers to participate midway through the month.

- Saturday May 17 (Pole Day): Intermittent showers, and the holdout of several ASPAR drivers, meant that only four cars completed qualifying runs. Ted Horn claimed the pole position with a speed of 126.564 mph. Novi teammates Cliff Bergere and Doc Williams both suffered spins during the afternoon. Both rebounded to qualify, with Bergere taking the middle of the front row. Williams completed a rather slow run (120.733 mph), not noticing his crew, who was trying to signal him to abort the run. Williams would be replaced by Herb Ardinger on race day.
- Sunday May 18: Three cars qualified, bringing the field to seven cars. Shorty Cantlon (121.462 mph) was the fastest of the day.
- Saturday May 24
- Sunday May 25
- Wednesday May 28: The final scheduled day of qualifying closed with 28 cars in the field.

When qualifying closed at 6 p.m. on Wednesday May 28, the field had only been filled to 28 cars. Duke Dinsmore was the final qualifier, completing his run amidst some scoring confusion by the officials, just as the time had run out. Race officials initially stressed that Wednesday would be the final day available to qualify. However, a day later, they re-opened qualifying for one hour late on Thursday May 29 in an effort to fill the field. Mel Hansen and Emil Andres were the only two cars to complete attempts, and after approval by the other entries, were added to the grid to bring the field to 30 cars.

The heartbreak story of the day belonged to driver Billy Devore. After failing to make the field on Wednesday, the Bill Schoof crew worked diligently to make repairs to their car, hoping that officials would re-open qualifying. When word was announced that additional time trials would be held Thursday, the crew scrambled to get the car prepared. Late in the evening, with about 20 minutes left until closing, the crew drove the race car from their garage about six miles away to the track with a police escort. When they arrived at the gate at 6:58 p.m., however, officials closed time trials, and DeVore was not permitted to qualify.

== Starting grid ==
Row	Inside	Middle	Outside
1	(United States) Ted Horn; 126.564 mph (203.685 km/h)	(United States) Cliff Bergere; 124.957 mph (201.099 km/h)	(United States) Mauri Rose W 124.040 mph (199.623 km/h)
2	(United States) Herb Ardinger*; 120.733 mph (194.301 km/h)	(United States) Shorty Cantlon ✝ 121.462 mph (195.474 km/h)	(United States) Russ Snowberger; 121.331 mph (195.263 km/h)
3	(United States) Les Anderson R 118.425 mph (190.587 km/h)	(United States) Bill Holland R 128.755 mph (207.211 km/h)	(United States) Ken Fowler; 123.423 mph (198.630 km/h)
4	(United States) Jimmy Jackson; 122.266 mph (196.768 km/h)	(United States) Milt Fankhouser R 119.932 mph (193.012 km/h)	(United States) Roland Free; 119.526 mph (192.358 km/h)
5	(United States) George Connor; 124.874 mph (200.965 km/h)	(United States) Walt Brown R 118.355 mph (190.474 km/h)	(United States) Frank Wearne; 117.716 mph (189.446 km/h)
6	(United States) Hal Robson; 122.096 mph (196.494 km/h)	(United States) Pete Romcevich R 117.218 mph (188.644 km/h)	(United States) Duke Nalon; 128.082 mph (206.128 km/h)
7	(United States) Al Miller; 124.848 mph (200.923 km/h)	(United States) Rex Mays; 124.412 mph (200.222 km/h)	(United States) Paul Russo; 123.967 mph (199.506 km/h)
8	(United States) Joie Chitwood; 123.157 mph (198.202 km/h)	(United States) Fred Agabashian R 121.478 mph (195.500 km/h)	(United States) Charles Van Acker R 121.049 mph (194.809 km/h)
9	(United States) Tony Bettenhausen; 120.980 mph (194.698 km/h)	(United States) Henry Banks; 120.923 mph (194.607 km/h)	(United States) Duke Dinsmore; 119.840 mph (192.864 km/h)
10	(United States) Cy Marshall; 115.644 mph (186.111 km/h)	(United States) Mel Hansen; 117.298 mph (188.773 km/h)	(United States) Emil Andres; 116.781 mph (187.941 km/h)

=== Failed to Qualify ===
- (United States) Walt Ader R (#6)
- (Belgium) Zora Arkus-Duntov R (#49)
- (United States) Bud Bardowski R
- (United States) Tommy Boggs R (#23)
- (United States) Frank Brisko
- (United Kingdom) Leslie Brooke R (#35)
- (United States) Jim Brubaker R (#86)
- (United States) Red Byron R (#22)
- (United States) Duane Carter R (#32)
- (United States) Hal Cole - Withdrew due to ASPAR dispute
- (United States) Charles Crawford (#67)
- (United States) Billy Devore (#17)
- (United States) Louis Durant (#23)
- (United States) Sam Grecco R (#51)
- (United States) Sam Hanks (#54)
- (United States) Tommy Hinnershitz (#5) - Did not arrive
- (United States) Norm Houser R (#69)
- (United States) Danny Kladis - Withdrew due to ASPAR dispute
- (United States) Johnny Mauro R (#64)
- (United States) Harry McQuinn
- (United States) George Metzler R (#55)
- (United States) Chet Miller - Withdrew due to ASPAR dispute
- (United States) Wally Mitchell R - Withdrew due to ASPAR dispute
- (United States) Overton Phillips - Withdrew due to ASPAR dispute
- (United States) Buddy Rusch R
- (United States) Art Scovell R
- (United States) Bill Sheffler - Withdrew due to ASPAR dispute
- (United States) Hal Stetson R - Did not appear
- (United States) Joel Thorne - Withdrew due to ASPAR dispute
- (United States) Louis Tomei (#44, #57)
- (United States) Steve Truchan R (#28)
- (United States) George Weaver R (#44)
- (United States) Doc Williams (#54)

== Race summary ==
Late in the race, Lou Moore teammates Bill Holland and Mauri Rose were running 1st and 2nd. The pit crew displayed a confusing chalkboard sign with the letters "EZY" to Holland, presumably meaning for him to take the final laps at a reduced pace to safely make it to the finish. Mauri Rose ignored the board, and charged to catch up to Holland. Holland believed he held a lap lead over Rose, and allowed him to catch up. The two drivers waved as Rose passed Holland, with Holland believing it was not more than a congratulatory gesture.

In reality, the pass Rose made was for the lead, and he led the final 8 laps to take the controversial victory. The race was marred by a 41st lap crash that claimed the life of Shorty Cantlon.

Rose's distance finish time of 4:17:52.17 was the second fastest finish of the Indianapolis 500 ever, at the time. Only the 1938 Indianapolis 500 had been completed in a faster total time as of 1947. After Rose completed the 500 mile distance, approximately 40 minutes was given for additional drivers to finish, before any remaining drivers who had not completed the distance by then were flagged off the track. The 1947 race was also the coldest on record, with an average temperature of 50 degrees and morning low of 37.

== Box score ==
Finish	Start	No	Name	Chassis	Engine	Laps	Time/Retired
1	3	27	(United States) Mauri Rose W	Diedt	Offenhauser	200	116.338 mph
2	8	16	(United States) Bill Holland R	Diedt	Offenhauser	200	+32.12
3	1	1	(United States) Ted Horn	Maserati	Maserati	200	+3:00.38
4	4	54	(United States) Herb Ardinger (Cliff Bergere Laps 70–200)	Kurtis Kraft	Novi	200	+6:40.35
5	10	7	(United States) Jimmy Jackson	Miller	Offenhauser	200	+8:00.48
6	20	9	(United States) Rex Mays	Kurtis Kraft	Winfield	200	+12:16.33
7	14	33	(United States) Walt Brown R	Alfa Romeo	Alfa Romeo	200	+36:49.40
8	28	34	(United States) Cy Marshall	A.R.-Weil	Alfa Romeo	197	-3 laps
9	23	41	(United States) Fred Agabashian R	Kurtis Kraft	Duray	191	-9 laps
10	27	10	(United States) Duke Dinsmore (Billy Devore Laps 79–118)	Wetteroth	Offenhauser	167	-33 laps
11	7	58	(United States) Les Anderson R	Maserati	Offenhauser	131	-69 laps
12	17	57	(United States) Pete Romcevich R	Miller	Ford	168	Oil line
13	30	3	(United States) Emil Andres (George Connor Laps 70–150)	Lencki	Lencki	150	Magneto
14	15	31	(United States) Frank Wearne (Louis Tomei Laps 54–103)	Miller	Offenhauser	128	Spun T3
15	9	47	(United States) Ken Fowler	Alfa Romeo	Alfa Romeo	121	Axle
16	18	46	(United States) Duke Nalon	Mercedes-Benz W154	Mercedes-Benz	119	Piston
17	12	42	(United States) Roland Free	Wetteroth	Miller	87	Spun
18	25	29	(United States) Tony Bettenhausen	Stevens	Offenhauser	79	Timing gear
19	6	25	(United States) Russ Snowberger	Maserati	Maserati	74	Oil pump
20	16	52	(United States) Hal Robson	Adams	Offenhauser	67	Universal joint
21	2	18	(United States) Cliff Bergere	Kurtis Kraft	Novi	62	Piston
22	22	8	(United States) Joie Chitwood	Wetteroth	Offenhauser	51	Gears
23	5	24	(United States) Shorty Cantlon ✝	Snowberger	Miller	40	Fatal crash T1
24	26	43	(United States) Henry Banks	Miller	Offenhauser	36	Oil line
25	19	66	(United States) Al Miller	Miller	Miller	33	Magneto
26	13	14	(United States) George Connor	Kurtis Kraft	Offenhauser	32	Fuel leak
27	29	38	(United States) Mel Hansen	Adams	Sparks	32	Disqualified, Pushed
28	21	15	(United States) Paul Russo	Shaw	Offenhauser	24	Crash FS
29	24	44	(United States) Charles Van Acker R	Stevens	Lencki	24	Crash FS
30	11	53	(United States) Milt Fankhouser R	Stevens	Offenhauser	15	Stalled

Note: Relief drivers in parentheses

W Former Indianapolis 500 winner

R Indianapolis 500 Rookie

All entrants utilized Firestone tires.

=== Race statistics ===
Lap Leaders
Laps	Leader
1–23	Cliff Bergere
24–59	Bill Holland
60–85	Mauri Rose
86–192	Bill Holland
193–200	Mauri Rose

Total laps led
Driver	Laps
Bill Holland	143
Mauri Rose	34
Cliff Bergere	23

Yellow Lights
Laps*	Reason
24	Milt Fankhouser off course in turn 1 Charles Van Acker, Paul Russo, crash on frontstretch (4:38)
40	Shorty Cantlon crash in turn 1
88	Roland Free spin in turn 1
* – Approximate lap counts

== Broadcasting ==
=== Radio ===
The race was carried live on the Mutual Broadcasting System, the precursor to the IMS Radio Network. The broadcast was sponsored by Perfect Circle Piston Rings and Bill Slater served as the anchor. The broadcast feature live coverage of the start, the finish, and live updates throughout the race.

Barry Lake served as "roving reporter," stationed on an Army Jeep. Larry Richardson was stationed in the new Press Paddock (constructed underneath the Paddock Penthouse upper deck) on the outside of the mainstretch, relaying scoring and official information.

Mutual Broadcasting System
Booth Announcers	Turn Reporters	Pits/roving reporters
Announcer: Bill Slater; Analyst: Gene Kelly; Press Paddock: Larry Richardson	South turns: Mike Dunn; Mainstretch: Gordon Graham; North turns: Jim Shelton	Norman Perry; Barry Lake

== See also ==
- 1947 AAA Championship Car season

== Notes ==
=== Works cited ===
- 1947 Indianapolis 500 Radio Broadcast, Mutual: Re-broadcast on "The All-Night Race Party" - WIBC-AM (May 29, 2004)

=== References ===
1946 Indianapolis 500; George Robson	1947 Indianapolis 500; Mauri Rose	1948 Indianapolis 500; Mauri Rose
