= Lee Wallard =

American racing driver (1910–1963)

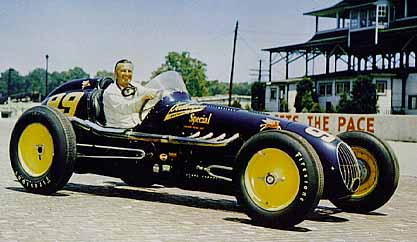
- Wallard's traditional victory photograph, taken the day after the 1951 Indianapolis 500
- Born: Leland Wallard; September 8, 1911 or September 7, 1910 or September 10, 1910 Schenectady, New York, U.S.
- Died: November 28, 1963 or November 29, 1963 St. Petersburg, Florida, U.S.

Championship titles
- Major victories Indianapolis 500 (1951)

Champ Car career
- 47+ races run over 7 years
- Best finish: 6th (1948)
- First race: 1941 Syracuse 100 (Syracuse)
- Last race: 1951 Indianapolis 500 (Indianapolis)
- First win: 1946 Rutland Race (Rutland)
- Last win: 1951 Indianapolis 500 (Indianapolis)
Wins	Podiums	Poles
3	10	2

Formula One World Championship career
- Active years: 1950–1951, 1954
- Team(s): Moore, Kurtis Kraft
- Entries: 3 (2 starts)
- Championships: 0
- Wins: 1
- Podiums: 1
- Career points: 9
- Pole positions: 0
- Fastest laps: 1
- First entry: 1950 Indianapolis 500
- First win: 1951 Indianapolis 500
- Last entry: 1954 Indianapolis 500

Leland "Lee" Wallard (September 8, 1911 or September 7, 1910 or September 10, 1910 – November 28, 1963 or November 29, 1963) was an American racing driver. After a slow start to his career, the unheralded Wallard scored a "Cinderella" victory, authoring a dominating performance in the 1951 Indianapolis 500. Days later, Wallard's career ended as he suffered severe burns when his car caught fire during a promotional event.

== Early life and career ==
Wallard was born in Schenectady, New York. He began competing in 1935, racing at dirt tracks and local fairgrounds. He endured a difficult start to his career, including an accident in which he broke his pelvis. He appeared in his first Championship Car event, Syracuse 100, in 1941.

Wallard enlisted in the U.S. Navy during the Second World War, serving with the U.S. Navy Seabees. He spent part of the conflict in Alaska, operating a bulldozer during the construction of numerous airfields.

== Post-war driving career ==
=== Championship car career ===
Wallard resumed his racing career following the war, competing more often at the AAA Championship level. He scored one victory in a "big car" event during the anomalous 1946 season. He scored his second, a regular "Championship car" victory, at DuQuoin during 1948.

==== Indianapolis 500 victory ====
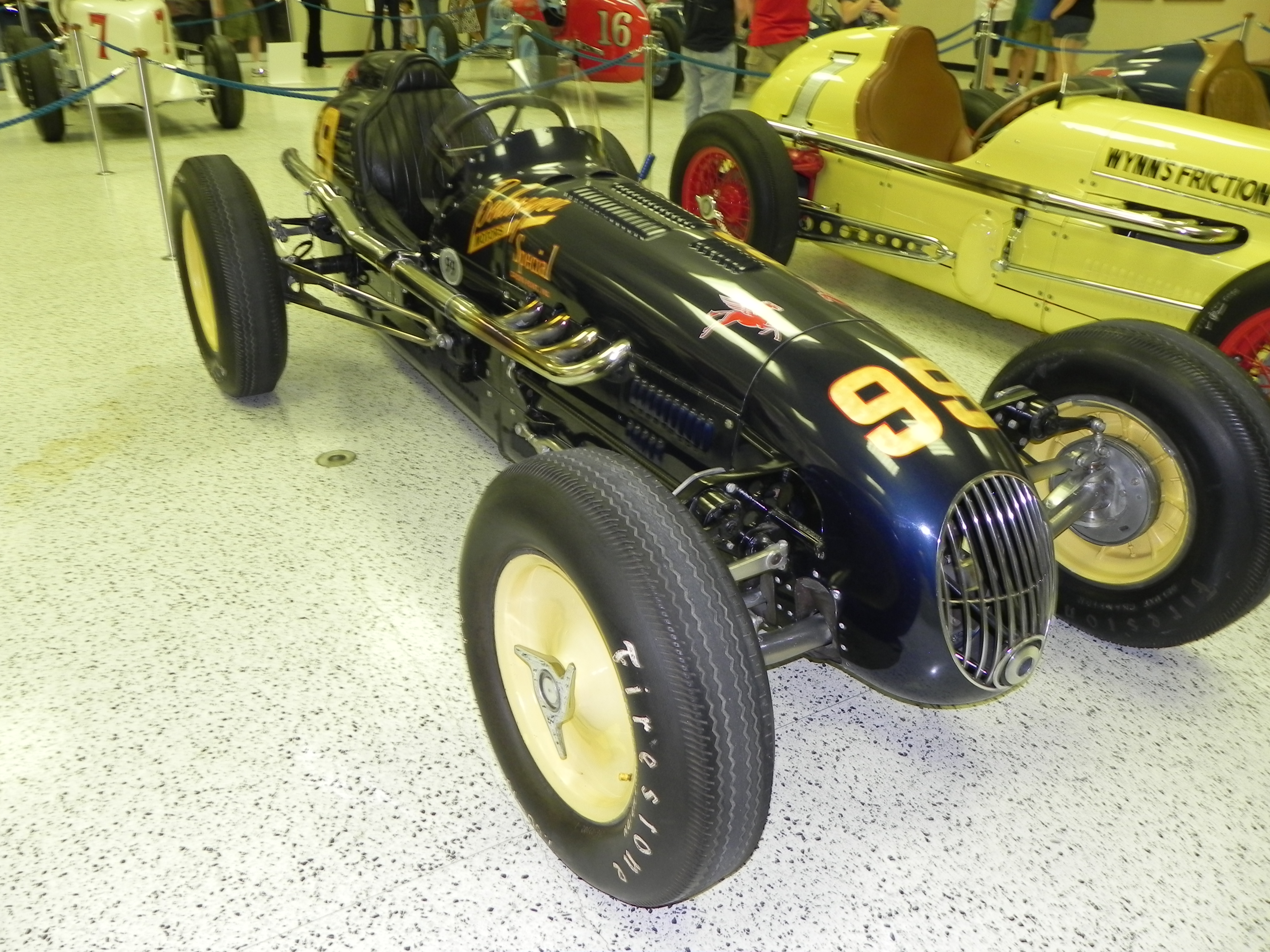
Wallard's winning car from the 1951 Indianapolis 500

In the 1951 Indianapolis 500, Wallard drove the Number 99 Belanger Special to victory, at age 40. Tony Bettenhausen had passed up the car, because he wanted to drive a newer front-wheel drive vehicle.

Starting on the front row, Wallard dominated the event, setting a pace that his competitors and their equipment struggled to match. Wallard led 159 of the 200 laps, and became the first driver to complete the event in less than four hours.

=== Career-ending injury ===
A week after winning the Indianapolis 500, Wallard was injured during an auto race in Reading, PA. He was severely burned when his race car caught fire in the home stretch of that race. He required 27 skin grafts. In 1954, he attempted to compete in Indianapolis again. He retired before qualifications, discovering the loss of muscle tissue he suffered in his accident made it impossible for him to handle his car at a competitive speed.

=== World Drivers' Championship career ===
The AAA/USAC-sanctioned Indianapolis 500 was included in the FIA World Drivers' Championship from 1950 through 1960. Drivers competing at Indianapolis during those years were credited with World Drivers' Championship participation, and were eligible to score WDC points alongside those which they may have scored towards the AAA/USAC National Championship.

Wallard participated in two World Drivers' Championship races at Indianapolis. He won once, and set one fastest leader lap. He scored nine World Drivers' Championship points.

== Post-driving life ==
Wallard later moved to Florida, and died of a heart attack related to the injuries he had suffered in 1951.

== Awards and honors ==
Wallard has been inducted into the following halls of fame:

- Auto Racing Hall of Fame (1955)
- Schenectady City School District Athletic Hall of Fame (2013)

== Motorsports career results ==
=== AAA Championship Car results ===
Year	1	2	3	4	5	6	7	8	9	10	11	12	13	14	15	Pos	Points
1946	INDY	LAN; 11	ATL	ISF	MIL	GOS										18th	291
1948	ARL	INDY; 7	MIL	LAN; 6	MIL; 5	SPR; 20	MIL; 11	DUQ; 1	ATL; 8	PIK	SPR; 6	DUQ; 9				6th	865
1949	ARL	INDY; 23	MIL	TRE; 15	SPR; 5	MIL; 21	DUQ; 4	PIK	SYR; 16	DET; 5	SPR; 3	LAN; 6	SAC; 7	DMR; 2		8th	760
1950	INDY; 6	MIL; 4	LAN; DNS	SPR; 2	MIL; 15	PIK	SYR; DNQ	DET; DNQ	SPR	SAC	PHX	BAY	DAR; 10			11th	637
1951	INDY; 1	MIL	LAN	DAR	SPR	MIL	DUQ	DUQ	PIK	SYR	DET	DNC	SJS	PHX	BAY	7th	1,000
1954	INDY; DNQ	MIL	LAN	DAR	SPR	MIL	DUQ	PIK	SYR	ISF	SAC	PHX	LVG			-	0

- 1946 table only includes results of the six races run to "championship car" specifications. Points total includes the 71 races run to "big car" specifications.

=== Indianapolis 500 results ===
Year	Car	Start	Qual	Rank	Finish	Laps	Led	Retired
1948	91	28	128.420	5	7	200	0	Running
1949	6	20	128.912	7	23	55	19	Gears
1950	8	23	132.436	5	6	136	0	Running
1951	99	2	135.039	5	1	200	159	Running
Totals						591	178	

Starts	4
Poles	0
Front Row	1
Wins	1
Top 5	1
Top 10	3
Retired	1

=== FIA World Drivers' Championship results ===
(key) (Races in italics indicate fastest lap)

Year	Entrant	Chassis	Engine	1	2	3	4	5	6	7	8	9	WDC	Points
1950	Blue Crown Spark Plug	Moore	Offenhauser L4	GBR	MON	500; 6	SUI	BEL	FRA	ITA			NC	0
1951	Belanger Motors	Kurtis Kraft	Offenhauser L4	SUI	500; 1	BEL	FRA	GBR	GER	ITA	ESP		7th	9
1954	Belanger Motors	Kurtis Kraft D	Offenhauser L4	ARG	500; DNQ	BEL	FRA	GBR	GER	SUI	ITA	ESP	NC	0

Preceded by Johnnie Parsons	Indianapolis 500 Winner; 1951	Succeeded by Troy Ruttman
