= George Robson (racing driver) =

American racing driver (1909–1946)

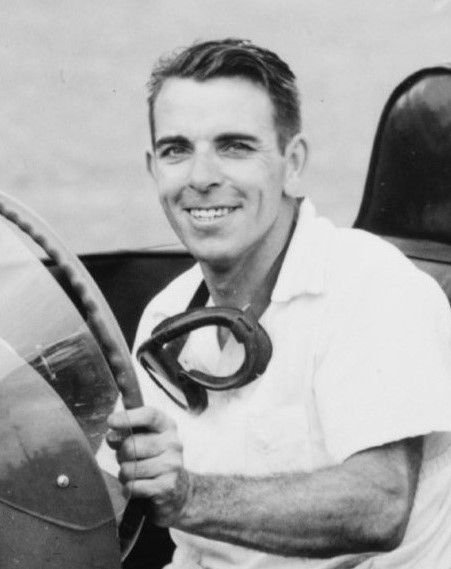
- Robson at Indianapolis in 1946
- Born: George Robson; February 24, 1909 Newcastle-upon-Tyne, Northumberland, England
- Died: September 2, 1946 (aged 37) Atlanta, Georgia, U.S.

Championship titles
- Major victories Indianapolis 500 (1946)

Champ Car career
- 22+ races run over 5 years
- Best finish: 2nd (1946)
- First race: 1938 Syracuse 100 (Syracuse)
- Last race: 1946 Atlanta 100 (Lakewood)
- First win: 1946 Indianapolis 500 (Indianapolis)
- Last win: 1946 Dayton Race #4 (Dayton)
Wins	Podiums	Poles
6	9	1

George Robson (February 24, 1909 – September 2, 1946) was an American racing driver. He is best known for winning the Indianapolis 500 in 1946. Although his earlier career had been unremarkable, Robson won several more races during the American Automobile Association (AAA) sanctioned 1946 Championship Car season, before being killed later that year in accident at Lakewood Speedway.

== Early life ==
Robson was born in the Benwell area of Newcastle-upon-Tyne, in England. He was the second child and eldest son of George William Robson, a machinist, and Elizabeth (née Davison). By the year 1911 Robson had moved with his family to the Mount Dennis neighborhood of York, Ontario, Canada.

In 1924, Robson's family emigrated to the United States, settling in Huntington Park, California. A few years later, Robson began working at a foundry. Robson married Marjorie (née June) in 1933, and a year later, the couple had a son, George William.

== Racing career ==
=== Early career ===
Robson began his racing career in the Los Angeles region during the mid-1930s. He made his debut at the Championship/Indy car level during the 1938 season in a race at the Syracuse Mile. Earlier that year, he had also competed in a non-championship points event held at the Milwaukee Mile.

In 1939, Robson drove relief in the Indianapolis 500. After failing to qualify for the race, but securing the position of first alternate, he took over for Harry McQuinn on the 77th lap, eventually dropping out on lap 110 with mechanical issues. Robson would go on to qualify for the following two Indianapolis 500s, finishing 23rd in 1940, and 25th in 1941.

Robson's most notable result before the onset of the Second World War halted racing in the United States was a second-place finish in the Syracuse 100 in 1940. Before the conflict he was working as a machinist in Los Angeles.

=== 1946 Indianapolis 500 victory ===
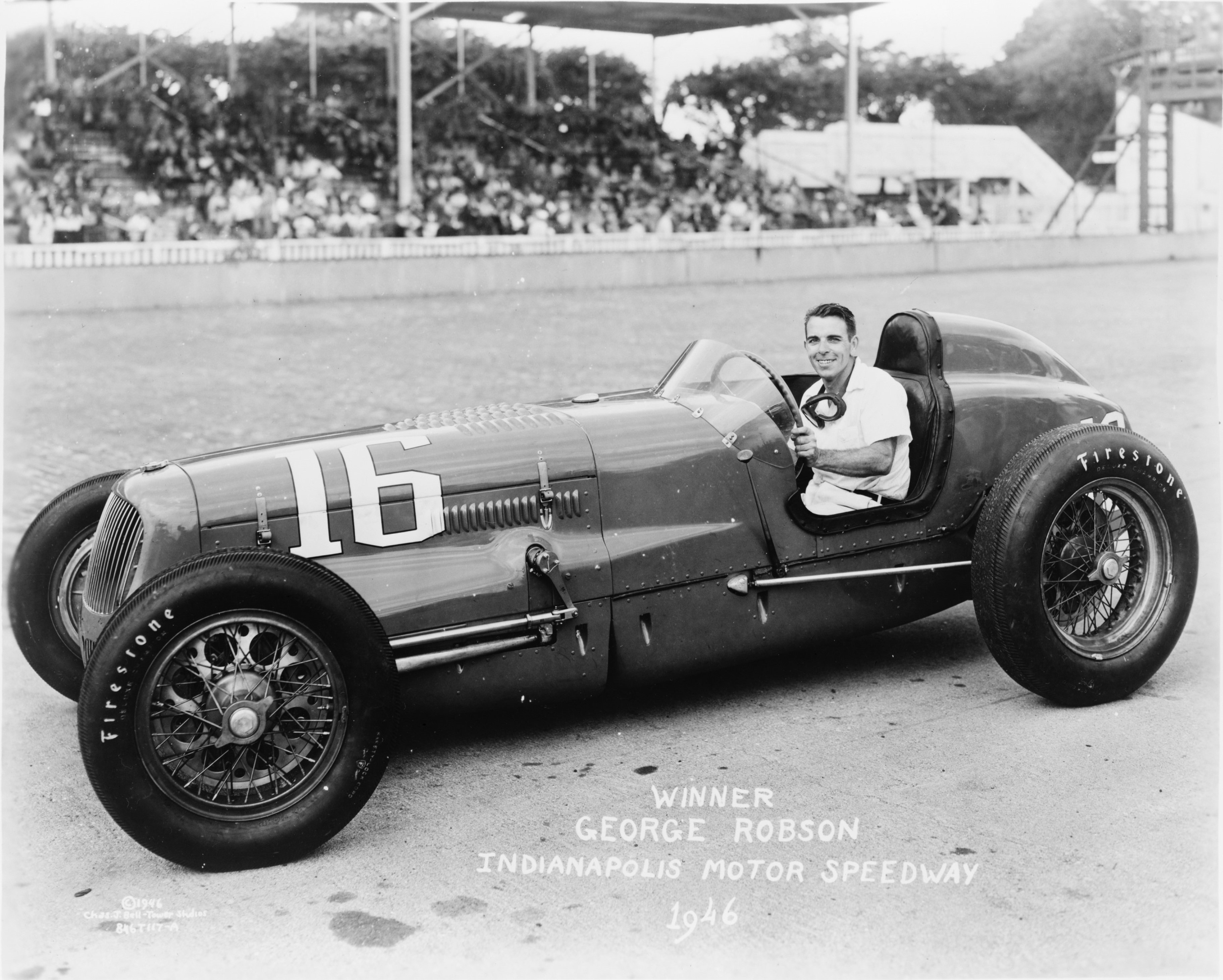
Robson before qualifications at the 1946 Indianapolis 500

Robson was the winner of the 1946 Indianapolis 500, the first running following the war. Driving for Joel Thorne, Robson made the field on the fourth day of qualifying, with the fifth fastest time overall. Robson started the race from the 15th position and steadily made his way though the field. He took the lead for the first time on lap 56, and aside from making pit stops, held it for the remainder of the race.

Robson's closest competitor during the latter half of the race was rookie Jimmy Jackson. Jackson lost time earlier in the race, forced to pit after his windshield was damaged by debris after Hal Robson - the younger brother of George - broke an engine rod. George Robson took the lead for good on lap 93. The race saw heavy attrition, and he ran much of the second half of the race at a measured pace.

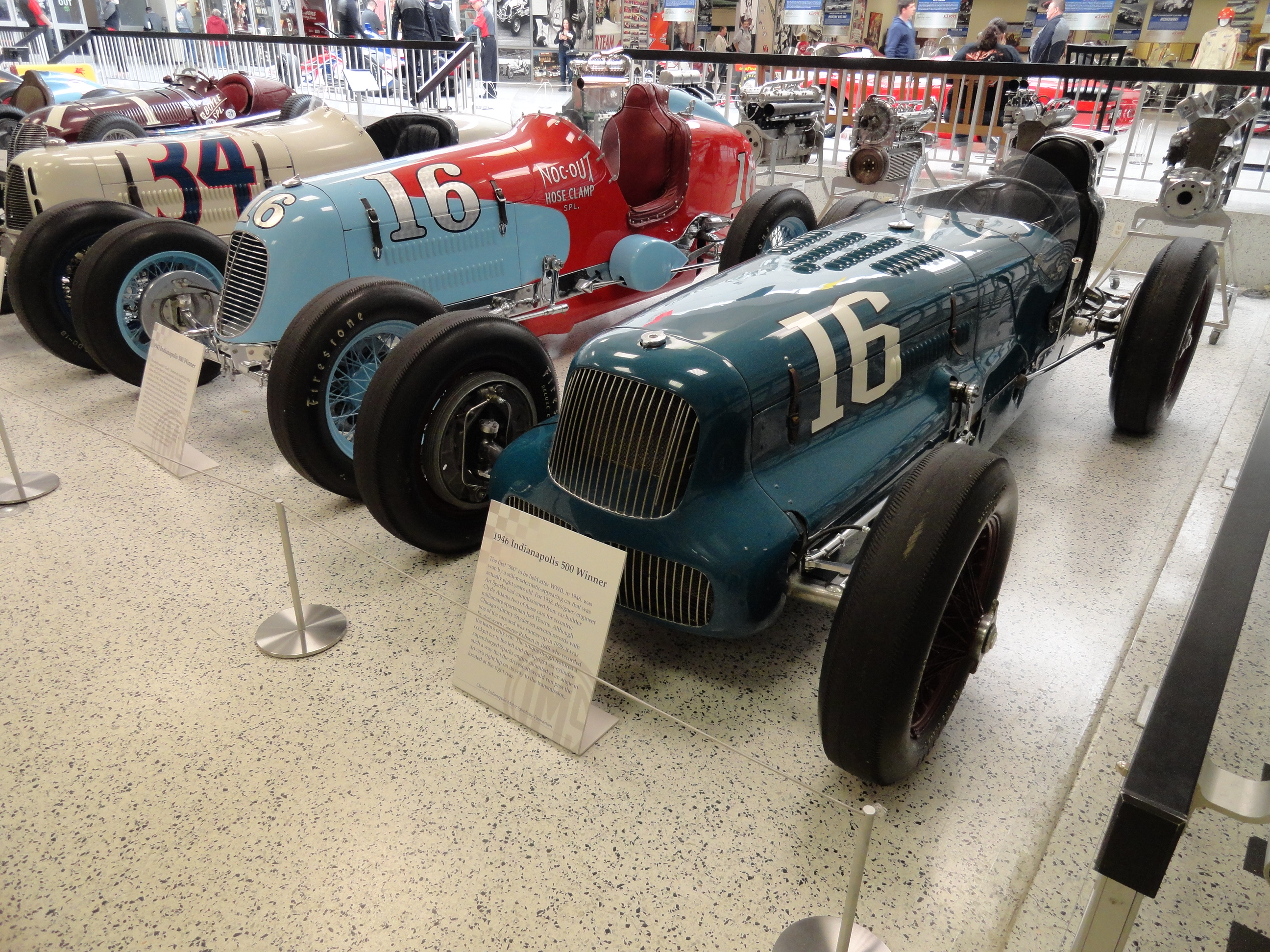
Robson's winning car from the 1946 Indianapolis 500

Robson finished more than 44 seconds ahead of Jackson, and led 138 laps of the 200 lap event. After the race there was a minor controversy as Robson was accused of not following the rules by choosing to remain within his car during pit stops. A protest was filed, but overruled, and Robson was declared the official winner of the race. His victory was the first for a 6-cylinder car since Ray Harroun in the Marmon "Wasp" won the inaugural Indianapolis 500 in 1911.

=== Post-victory career ===
The anomalous 1946 points season featured more than 70 races, only six of which were run to "championship car" specifications. AAA officials, fearing small car counts after more than four years without racing, looked to boost entry numbers by including 71 races run to "big car" specifications. These races were run at distances shorter than 100 miles. Robson performed strongly after his surprise '500' victory. He finished second to Rex Mays in the Langhorne 100, the second race of the season held to "championship car" specifications. Heading into the second-half of the season Robson had won six races in total and was running second in the points standings.

== Death ==
The third "championship" level race of the season was held at Atlanta's Lakewood Speedway, a track notorious for its often dusty conditions. With two laps to go in the 100 lap event, visibility was at a minimum. On the 98th lap, possibly with a mechanical problem, Robson moved low to the inside of the track.

Robson quickly came upon the slow-moving car of Billy Devore. Seeing Devore at the last moment, Robson veered to the right and was hit by George Barringer, while simultaneously making contact with Devore's right rear wheel. The impact sent Devore over a stone wall, where he landed upside down in a creek and was rescued by crowd members.

Robson's car began tumbling wildly, throwing him to his death. Barringer, spinning sideways across oncoming traffic, was hit by Bud Bardowski. Barringer succumbed to massive internal trauma a few hours after the accident. Bardowski survived with bruising and lacerations.

== Motorsports career results ==
=== AAA Championship Car results ===
Year	1	2	3	4	5	6	Pos	Points
1946	INDY; 1	LAN; 2	ATL; 7	ISF	MIL	GOS	2nd	1,544

- 1946 table only includes results of the six races run to "championship car" specifications. Points total includes the 71 races run to "big car" specifications.

=== Indianapolis 500 results ===
Year	Car	Start	Qual	Rank	Finish	Laps	Led	Retired
1940	17	23	122.562	18	23	67	0	Shock absorber
1941	10	16	121.576	22	25	66	0	Oil leak
1946	16	15	125.541	5	1	200	138	Running
Totals						333	138	

Starts	3
Poles	0
Front Row	0
Wins	1
Top 5	1
Top 10	1
Retired	2

Preceded by Mauri Rose; Floyd Davis	Indianapolis 500 Winner; 1946	Succeeded by Mauri Rose
