= George Connor (racing driver) =

American racing driver (1906–2001)

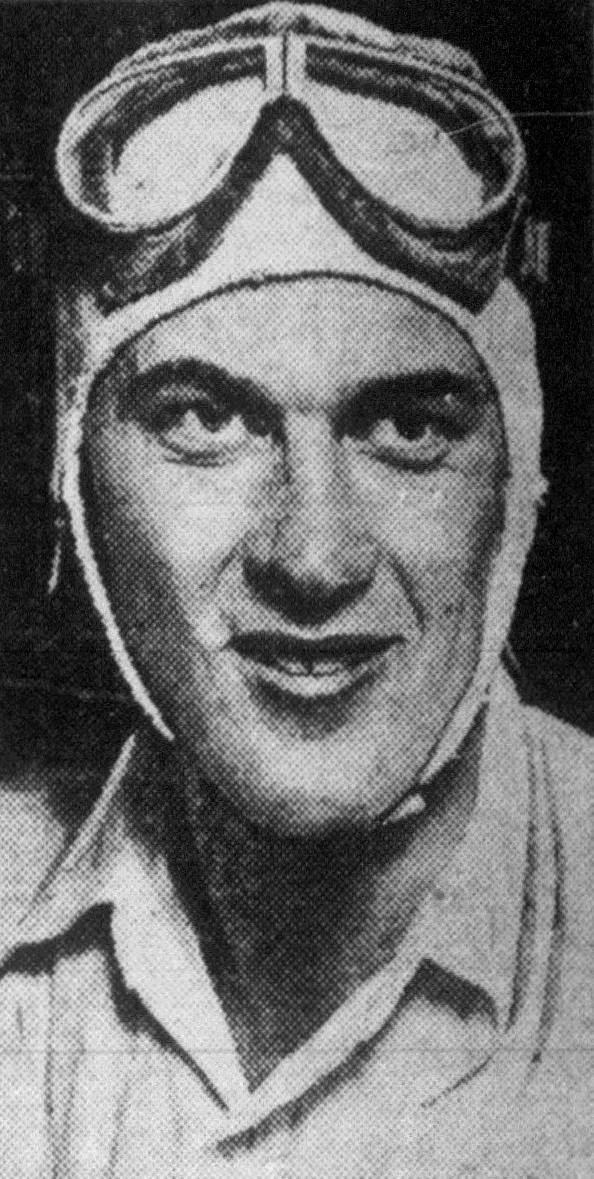
- Conner, circa 1933
- Born: Charles George Connor; August 16, 1906 Rialto, California, U.S.
- Died: March 28, 2001 (aged 94) Hesperia, California, U.S.

Champ Car career
- 63+ races run over 17 years
- Best finish: 5th (1949)
- First race: 1935 Indianapolis 500 (Indianapolis)
- Last race: 1952 Milwaukee 200 (Milwaukee)
- First win: 1946 Dayton Race #3 (Dayton)
- Last win: 1946 Atlanta 100 (Lakewood)
Wins	Podiums	Poles
2	9	1

Formula One World Championship career
- Active years: 1950–1953
- Team(s): Lesovsky, Kurtis Kraft
- Entries: 4 (3 starts)
- Championships: 0
- Wins: 0
- Podiums: 0
- Career points: 0
- Pole positions: 0
- Fastest laps: 0
- First entry: 1950 Indianapolis 500
- Last entry: 1953 Indianapolis 500

Charles George Connor (August 16, 1906 – March 28, 2001) was an American racing driver. At the time of Connor's death, he was the final surviving driver to have participated in a pre-Second World War Championship car event.

== World Drivers' Championship career ==
The AAA/USAC-sanctioned Indianapolis 500 was included in the FIA World Drivers' Championship from 1950 through 1960. Drivers competing at Indianapolis during those years were credited with World Drivers' Championship participation, and were eligible to score WDC points alongside those which they may have scored towards the AAA/USAC National Championship.

Connor participated in three World Drivers' Championship races at Indianapolis. His best finish was eighth place, twice, and he scored no World Drivers' Championship points.

== Motorsports career results ==
=== Indianapolis 500 results ===
Year	Car	Start	Qual	Rank	Finish	Laps	Led	Retired
1935	37	14	114.321	19	19	112	0	Transmission
1936	38	5	116.269	9	10	200	0	Running
1937	17	12	120.240	8	9	200	0	Running
1938	15	19	120.326	18	19	119	0	Engine
1939	18	12	123.208	19	13	195	0	Stalled
1940	10	17	124.585	8	26	52	0	Rod
1941	14	13	123.984	10	16	167	0	Transmission
1946	38	30	120.006	26	24	38	0	Piston
1947	14	13	124.874	5	26	32	0	Fuel leak
1948	9	17	123.018	25	28	24	0	Drive shaft
1949	22	6	128.228	13	3rd	200	0	Running
1950	5	4	132.163	7	8	135	0	Running
1951	22	21	133.353	19	30	29	0	Universal joint
1952	54	14	135.609	15	8	200	0	Running
Totals						1703	0	

Starts	14
Poles	0
Front Row	0
Wins	0
Top 5	1
Top 10	5
Retired	9

- In 14 Indianapolis starts, Connor drove 4,257 miles (6,851 km) without leading a lap. This ranks sixth on the all-time list.

=== AAA Championship Car results ===
Year	1	2	3	4	5	6	7	8	9	10	11	12	13	14	15	Pos	Points
1946	INDY; 24	LAN; 9	ATL; 1	ISF; 7	MIL; 10	GOS; 9										12th	380
1947	INDY; 26	MIL; 4	LAN; 15	ATL; 14	BAI; 5	MIL; 5	GOS; 5	MIL; 3	PIK	SPR; 15	ARL; DNQ					9th	560
1948	ARL	INDY; 28	MIL; DNQ	LAN; 5	MIL; DNQ	SPR; 11	MIL; 17	DUQ	ATL	PIK	SPR; 5	DUQ; DNQ				19th	287
1949	ARL	INDY; 3	MIL; 16	TRE; DNQ	SPR; 16	MIL; 7	DUQ; 3	PIK	SYR; 5	DET; 13	SPR; 6	LAN	SAC; 11	DMR; 9		5th	1,200
1950	INDY; 8	MIL; 10	LAN; DNQ	SPR; 9	MIL; 19	PIK	SYR; 17	DET; 9	SPR; 13	SAC	PHX	BAY	DAR			20th	282.5
1951	INDY; 30	MIL; DNQ	LAN; DNS	DAR; 25	SPR; DNQ	MIL; 12	DUQ	DUQ; DNQ	PIK	SYR; DNQ	DET	DNC	SJS; DNQ	PHX	BAY	50th	20
1952	INDY; 8	MIL	RAL; 21	SPR	MIL; 20	DET; DNQ	DUQ; DNQ	PIK	SYR	DNC; DNP	SJS	PHX				22nd	250
1953	INDY; DNQ	MIL	SPR	DET	SPR	MIL	DUQ	PIK	SYR	ISF	SAC	PHX				-	0
1954	INDY; DNQ	MIL	LAN	DAR	SPR	MIL	DUQ	PIK	SYR	ISF	SAC	PHX	LVG			-	0

- 1946 table only includes results of the six races run to "championship car" specifications. Points total includes the 71 races run to "big car" specifications.

=== FIA World Drivers' Championship results ===
(key)

Year	Entrant	Chassis	Engine	1	2	3	4	5	6	7	8	9	WDC	Points
1950	Blue Crown Spark Plug / Moore	Lesovsky	Offenhauser L4	GBR	MON	500; 8	SUI	BEL	FRA	ITA			NC	0
1951	Blue Crown Spark Plug / Marant	Lesovsky	Offenhauser L4	SUI	500; 30	BEL	FRA	GBR	GER	ITA	ESP		NC	0
1952	Federal Engineering	Kurtis Kraft 3000	Offenhauser L4	SUI	500; 8	BEL	FRA	GBR	GER	NED	ITA		NC	0
1953	Chrysler / Wolcott	Kurtis Kraft 500A	Chrysler V8	ARG	500; DNQ	NED	BEL	FRA	GBR	GER	SUI	ITA	NC	0
