= Hal Robson =

American racing driver (1911–1996)

- Born: Harold Robson; August 16, 1911 York, Ontario, Canada
- Died: July 2, 1996 (aged 84) Needles, California, U.S.

Champ Car career
- 15+ races run over 7 years
- Best finish: 20th (1948)
- First race: 1940 Syracuse 100 (Syracuse)
- Last race: 1949 Springfield 100 #2 (Springfield)
- First win: 1946 Dayton Race #5 (Dayton)
Wins	Podiums	Poles
1	1	0

Harold Robson (August 16, 1911 – July 2, 1996) was an American racing driver active during the 1940s.

== Biography ==
Robson was the brother of 1946 Indianapolis 500 winner George Robson. Hal became a U.S. citizen at the same time as his brother in 1937. He won the first race he competed in following his brother's death - his only career victory.

== Motorsports career results ==
=== Indianapolis 500 results ===
Year	Car	Start	Qual	Rank	Finish	Laps	Led	Retired
1946	48	23	121.466	16	25	37	0	Rod
1947	52	16	122.096	12	20	67	0	Universal joint
1948	64	18	122.796	26	15	164	0	Valve
Totals						268	0	

Starts	3
Poles	0
Front Row	0
Wins	0
Top 5	0
Top 10	0
Retired	3
