= Ken Fowler =

American racing driver (1907–1981)

- Born: Kenneth Leon Fowler; March 15, 1907 Dayton, Ohio, U.S.
- Died: January 16, 1981 (aged 73) St. James City, Florida, U.S.

Champ Car career
- 8 races run over 4 years
- Best finish: 19th (tie) (1935)
- First race: 1935 Springfield 100 (Springfield)
- Last race: 1948 DuQuoin 100 #2 (DuQuoin)
Wins	Podiums	Poles
0	0	0

Kenneth Leon Fowler (March 15, 1907 – January 16, 1981) was an American racing driver.

== Motorsports career results ==
=== Indianapolis 500 results ===
Year	Car	Start	Qual	Rank	Finish	Laps	Led	Retired
1937	41	29	117.421	26	19	116	0	Pushed
1947	47	9	123.423	9	15	121	0	Axle
Totals						237	0	

Starts	2
Poles	0
Front Row	0
Wins	0
Top 5	0
Top 10	0
Retired	2
