= 1946 Indianapolis 500 =

American motor race

30th Indianapolis 500
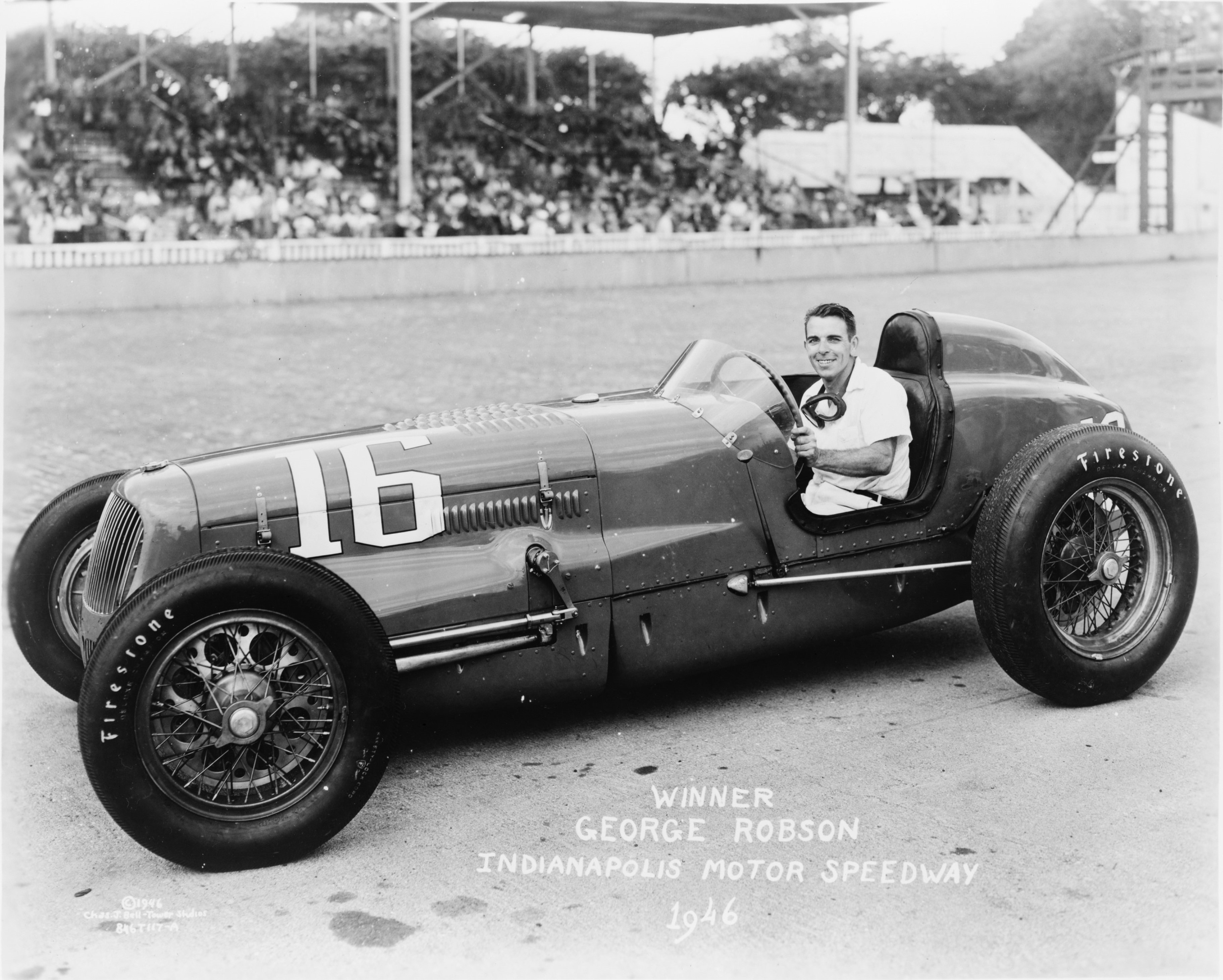

Indianapolis Motor Speedway

Indianapolis 500
- Sanctioning body: AAA
- Date: May 30, 1946
- Winner: George Robson
- Winning Entrant: Joel Thorne
- Winning Chief Mechanic: Eddie Offut
- Winning time: 4:21:26.70
- Average speed: 114.820 mph (184.785 km/h)
- Pole position: Cliff Bergere
- Pole speed: 126.471 mph (203.535 km/h)
- Most laps led: George Robson (138)

Pre-race
- Pace car: Lincoln Continental
- Pace car driver: Henry Ford II
- Starter: Seth Klein
- Honorary referee: Jack Dempsey
- Estimated attendance: 165,000

Chronology
| Previous | Next |
|---|---|
| 1942-45 (canceled-WWII) | 1947 |

The 30th International 500-Mile Sweepstakes was held at the Indianapolis Motor Speedway on Thursday, May 30, 1946. This was the first Indianapolis 500 presided over by Tony Hulman, the third owner of the Speedway. The track had closed in late 1941 due to World War II, and over the next four years, the facility fell into a terrible state of disrepair. Hulman purchased the Speedway in November 1945, and quickly went to work cleaning up the grounds, which had become overwhelmed by overgrowth and weeds. The Speedway re-opened, and the 1946 race was considered a rousing success.

Race winner George Robson would be killed in a racing crash just months after the victory.

The 1946 running of the 500 was the first of sixty-one consecutive years (1946–2006) that featured popular fixture Tom Carnegie on the Speedway public address system.

During the pre-race ceremonies, James Melton performed the song "Back Home Again in Indiana." It was the first time the traditional song had been performed before the start of the race.

== Sale of the Speedway ==
On December 7, 1941, the attack on Pearl Harbor launched the United States into World War II. On December 29, 1941, then-president of the Indianapolis Motor Speedway Eddie Rickenbacker announced that the 1942 Indianapolis 500 was cancelled, and the race would remain suspended throughout the duration of the war. The Speedway gates were locked, and the facility was abandoned. The race would not be held from 1942 to 1945. During the period in which the track was closed, it fell into a terrible state of disrepair. Grass and weeds overwhelmed the brick racing surface, and the old wooden grandstands became frail and unsuitable and inhospitable.

Tony Hulman announced the Indianapolis 500 would resume on its traditional date of Memorial Day for 1946. The AAA Contest Board subsequently announced that the specifications and rules would remain largely unchanged from 1941.

In mid-December, Indiana Lieutenant Governor Richard T. James, while on an official trip to Europe, formally extended invitations to European racing teams to enter for the 500.

== Race schedule ==
The deadline for entries to be received was midnight on May 1, along with a $125 entry fee. As had been customary, the track was made available for practice beginning May 1. Some teams, however, began arriving and setting up at the track as early as mid-March. Due to the ongoing renovations and construction, spectators were not allowed through the gates until May 11; only participants and press were allowed to enter the gates before then. In addition, practice over the first ten days of May was limited to 4:00 p.m. to 7:00 p.m. daily. On May 11, the track was opened to spectators for the first time during the month for a charge of 50¢ per person. Also on May 11, practice time was extended from 9:00 a.m. to 7:00 p.m.

Time trials was tentatively scheduled for five days - the two weekends leading up to race day, along with the Tuesday two days before the race. However, rain and the lingering shortage of necessary parts kept many of the cars off the track. Eventually, eight total days were made available for qualifying in order to fill the field to the traditional 33 cars.

Race schedule — May 1929
| Sun | Mon | Tue | Wed | Thu | Fri | Sat |
|---|---|---|---|---|---|---|
| | | | 1 | 2 | 3 | 4 |
| 5 | 6 | 7 | 8 | 9 | 10 | 11; Spectator Opening Day |
| 12 | 13 | 14 | 15 | 16 | 17 | 18; Time Trials |
| 19; Time Trials | 20; Time Trials | 21 | 22; Time Trials | 23 | 24 | 25; Time Trials |
| 26; Time Trials | 27; Time Trials | 28; Time Trials | 29 | 30; Indy 500 | 31 | |

| Color | Notes |
|---|---|
| Green | Track Available for Practice |
| Dark Blue | Time trials |
| Silver | Race day |
| Red | Rained out* |
| Blank | No track activity |

* Includes days where track activity
was significantly limited due to rain

== Race preparations ==
=== January ===
The rules announced were largely carried over from 1941, with few changes. Prize money was set at $20,000 for first place, and the traditional 33 cars would make up the starting grid.

=== February ===
Tickets for the 1946 Indianapolis 500 officially went on sale on February 1. Mail orders had been pouring steadily in since the track was sold in November. Some eager fans sent requests for tickets as early as August (shortly after V-J Day) anticipating the track would reopen. Even though at the time there were no plans yet in place to reopen the track, much less hold the race.

Numerous announcements were made with regard to officials and personnel. Seth Klein returned as the chief starter, Chester Ricker returned as the director of timing and scoring, and Henry Ford II was named the driver of the Lincoln Continental pace car. Kirkpatrick studio was signed on as the official photographers of the 500-mile race. The Indiana State Police was assigned to crowd control duties.

Entries slowly began to arrive, bringing the total to six by the end of the month. Cliff Bergere and Joie Chitwood were the first two drivers to be entered. Cars were entered for Russ Snowberger, Ted Horn and George Connor. On February 7, Harry McQuinn flew into the Speedway, landing his Aeronca Champion airplane on the backstretch, arriving to personally deliver his entry for the race. Construction workers at the track briefly halted work to watch the plane land. Though not yet entered, driver Al Putnam was preparing for the race.

=== March ===
Speedway officials continued to rebuild staff for the race. Clifford M. Rigsbee was appointed head of a new technical group at the Speedway. A welcoming committee with the local chamber of commerce was formed, in order to re-acclimate spectators to the event after the hiatus during the war. In addition, the Speedway announced Dr. E. Rogers Smith as the chief of the track medical staff.

The $300,000 renovation project at the track was reported to be on-schedule. The grounds were now mostly cleaned up, and the biggest item of work was the pouring of concrete for the new Paddock grandstand across from the Pagoda. Excavation for the new G grandstand was underway, and many new parquet seats were already in place behind the pit area. The old diner adjacent to Gasoline Alley had been razed and a new restaurant was to be built in its place. With less than two months until race day, advanced reserved tickets sales were reported as brisk.

By the end of the month, the entry list was up to 15 cars. Cars were entered for Al Putnam, Steve Truchan, and Arthur M. Sims entered the machine that Wilbur Shaw drove to victory in the 1937 race, but a driver was not yet named. One other car was entered by Ed Walsh without a driver named. Three-time pole position holder and 1941 National Champion Rex Mays was slated to drive the Bowes Seal Fast Special, the same car he drove to second place in 1941. Despite facing financial and transportation difficulties, at least five European drivers were inquiring about submitting entries.

Early in the month, a minor controversy loomed. It was reported some drivers, particularly those from the U.S. West Coast, were expressing concern about the perceived low purse announced for the race.

=== April ===
With less than a month to go before the track officially opened for practice, entries continued to pour in. Cars were entered for Harry Schell, Raphaël Bethenod, Emil Andres, George Barringer, Joel Thorne, Cliff Bergere, Rudolf Caracciola, Tazio Nuvolari, Chet Miller, and several others. By the end of the month, the entry list was up to 44 cars.

Refurbishment of the facility continued, including the near-completion of new grandstands. On April 6, the Speedway Golf Course opened for business. Officials announced that a small number of tickets were still available.

George Barringer arrived with his car on April 22, and two days later on April 24, Barringer became the first driver to take to the track for the year. Barringer's supercharged rear-engined machine completed laps over 115 mph. Track president Wilbur Shaw, George Connor, Chet Miller, and others were on hand to watch. The following day, April 25, Tony Bettenhausen became the second driver to take laps.

Off the track, Roy E. Cole, vice-president in charge of engineering at Studebaker, was named the chairman of the technical committee for the race. Also, the Lap Prize Fund was accumulating, and the prize fund was announced at $60,000, quelling some of the concern about a low purse.

== Practice ==
The track officially opened for practice on Wednesday May 1. However, practice time was limited to 4:00 pm to 7:00 pm for the first ten days in order to allow construction crews extra time to finish refurbishing the facility. In addition, spectators were not allowed inside the gates until May 11. The deadline for entries to be received was midnight on May 1, and any entries postmarked on or before May 1 were accepted. Numerous entries came in just before the deadline, bringing the total to 56 cars.

During the first week, many drivers and mechanics had arrived at the track, often seen hanging out at the restaurant in Gasoline Alley, and working on cars. However, few cars took to the track yet. At least ten cars were already in the garage area by Saturday May 4, with more arriving each day. At the end of the first week, Tazio Nuvolari announced he was withdrawing from the race, due to the death of his son. Achille Varzi was named his replacement, but the car would ultimately fail to qualify.

Practice started in earnest beginning on May 11. The track was now open from 9:00 a.m. to 7:00 p.m., and spectators were allowed to attended.

== Time trials ==
Time trials was originally scheduled for five days (May 18–19, 25–26, and 28), but rain delays took away available track time. In addition, post-war shortages of certain replacement parts delayed some cars from being able to participate in practice sessions. Officials eventually would make the track available for qualifying on three additional days in order to fill the field to the traditional 33 cars. The minimum speed to qualify was set at 115 mph. Approximately 56 entries were expected to make attempts to qualify.

Officials retained the four lap (10-mile) qualifying runs that were traditional from 1920 to 1933 and from 1939 to 1941. The fastest qualifier on the first day of time trials ("pole day") would win the pole position. Cars that qualified on the second day would line up behind the first qualifiers, and so on. Prior to World War II, on time trials days the track would typically be open until "sundown." But for 1946, the times were standardized such that the track would close each day at 5:30 p.m., except for the final day - unless weather interfered.

=== Saturday May 18 ===
The first day of time trials was scheduled for Saturday May 18. The track would be open from 10:30 a.m. to 5:30 p.m. The favorites for the front row included Harry McQuinn, Cliff Bergere, Rex Mays, and Ted Horn. Since many teams were lacking practice time, and some lacking parts, less than a dozen cars were expected to take to the track on Saturday.

Over 20,000 spectators arrived for the first significant track action in nearly five years. However, rain threatened most of the afternoon, and allowed only six cars to complete runs. During a practice run, Frank McGurk in the Shoof Special spun coming out of turn four and hit the outside wall. The car hit the outside rail a second time, then slid across the track hitting the inside guardrail. McGurk was not seriously injured. The car was not seriously damaged, and was expected to be repaired. Pole favorites Rex Mays and Ted Horn suffered engine problems, preventing them from going out Saturday. Horn broke a water pump, while Mays suffered broken connecting rods and bearings.

Indy veteran Cliff Bergere won the pole position with a speed of 126.471 mph. At age 49, Bergere became the oldest pole winner in Indy history up to that point. Paul Russo, driving a unique twin-four-cylinder engine machine, qualified second to sit in the middle of the front row. On Russo's car, one engine drove the front axle, and the second engine drove the rear axle. Russo was on pace to take the pole through three laps, but on his fourth and final lap, one of his superchargers got too hot, and dropped the speed down. Sam Hanks rounded out the front row, despite leaking oil which obscured his goggles. Rear-wheel drive cars swept two spots on the front row, with Jimmy Jackson (5th) the highest front-wheel-drive-only machine.

Rain closed the track for nearly two hours, prompting officials to extend qualifying until 7:30 p.m. Still, only seven cars made runs, and only six were completed. Mauri Rose had a fast first lap that could have put him on the front row, but the engine threw a rod on lap two.

| Pos | No. | Name | Lap 1 (mph) | Lap 2 (mph) | Lap 3 (mph) | Lap 4 (mph) | Average Speed (mph) | Notes |
|---|---|---|---|---|---|---|---|---|
| 1 | 3 | (United States) Cliff Bergere | 126.743 | 126.511 | 125.436 | 127.208 | 126.471 | |
| 2 | 10 | (United States) Paul Russo | 127.350 | 126.814 | 127.371 | 123.288 | 126.183 | |
| 3 | 32 | (United States) Sam Hanks | 126.098 | 124.706 | 123.694 | 124.189 | 124.762 | |
| 4 | 47 | (United States) Hal Cole R | 120.514 | 120.773 | 120.096 | 121.540 | 120.728 | |
| 5 | 61 | (United States) Jimmy Jackson R | 120.643 | 119.592 | 120.563 | 119.872 | 120.257 | |
| 6 | 33 | (United States) Louis Durant R | 119.111 | 119.348 | 119.205 | 118.234 | 118.973 | |
| — | 8 | (United States) Mauri Rose | 125.980 | | | | Incomplete | Engine threw a rod |

- Source: The Indianapolis Star

=== Sunday May 19 ===
Time trials was scheduled for 12:00 p.m. to 7:30 p.m. A crowd of 40,000-60,000 spectators arrived but not a single car made a qualifying attempt. High winds kept most cars off the track early on, and later rain washed out most of remainder of the afternoon. Some cars did practice, but when the rains came, most spectators departed. Officials announced that Monday May 20 would be designated for qualifying, in order to make up for lost track time over the weekend.

=== Monday May 20 ===
After weather interfered on Sunday, officials made Monday May 20 available for qualifications. Three cars completed runs in front of a small crowd of only 3,000 spectators. Ted Horn (driving Wilbur Shaw's 1940 winning car) was the fastest of the day. Horn's car, prepared by "Cotton" Henning, ran two identical laps, and put him on the inside of row three.

Officials announced that Tuesday May 21 would not be available for qualifications.

| Pos | No. | Name | Lap 1 (mph) | Lap 2 (mph) | Lap 3 (mph) | Lap 4 (mph) | Average Speed (mph) | Notes |
|---|---|---|---|---|---|---|---|---|
| 7 | 29 | (United States) Ted Horn | 124.206 | 123.745 | 124.206 | 123.762 | 123.980 | |
| 8 | 45 | (United States) Duke Dinsmore R | 122.666 | 123.321 | 123.660 | 123.474 | 123.279 | |
| — | 42 | (United States) Tony Bettenhausen R | 122.084 | 122.017 | 122.117 | 122.228 | 121.860 | Withdrawn 5/28 |

=== Tuesday May 21 ===
Charles Van Acker crashed. Duke Nalon made an exhibition run.

=== Wednesday May 22 ===
Qualifying resumed on Wednesday May 22. Approximately 20,000 spectators saw five cars complete runs, and the field was filled to 14 cars. Mauri Rose, who threw a rod on his first attempts, returned Wednesday with a different engine, was the fastest car of the day.

During a practice run for his driver's test, Hal Robson broke an axle in turn two, lost a wheel, and spun out. Robson was not injured, and completed the test later on in a different car.

| Pos | No. | Name | Lap 1 (mph) | Lap 2 (mph) | Lap 3 (mph) | Lap 4 (mph) | Average Speed (mph) | Notes |
|---|---|---|---|---|---|---|---|---|
| 9 | 8 | (United States) Mauri Rose | 125.125 | 123.457 | 123.609 | 124.052 | 124.065 | |
| 10 | 25 | (United States) Russ Snowberger | 122.349 | 121.852 | 120.935 | 121.245 | 121.593 | |
| 11 | 18 | (United States) Emil Andres | 121.163 | 121.589 | 120.968 | 120.838 | 121.139 | |
| 12 | 24 | (United States) Joie Chitwood | 120.144 | 120.224 | 119.570 | 119.332 | 119.816 | |
| 13 | 12 | (United States) Al Putnam | 117.325 | 115.370 | 115.518 | 116.944 | 116.283 | |

=== Saturday May 25 ===
After two days of practice only, time trials resumed on Saturday May 25. With a speed of 128.861 mph, Rex Mays tentatively became the fastest qualifier in the field. As a qualifier on the fourth day, however, Mays would line up in 14th starting position. Mays was followed by George Robson and Jimmy Wilburn, both over 125 mph. Wilburn had passed his rookie driver's test just two hours prior to making his attempt. A crowd of about 12,500 witnessed the afternoon.

| Pos | No. | Name | Lap 1 (mph) | Lap 2 (mph) | Lap 3 (mph) | Lap 4 (mph) | Average Speed (mph) | Notes |
|---|---|---|---|---|---|---|---|---|
| 14 | 1 | (United States) Rex Mays | 129.608 | 128.737 | 128.133 | 128.977 | 128.861 | |
| 15 | 16 | (United States) George Robson | 127.262 | 125.611 | 125.401 | 123.938 | 125.541 | |
| 16 | 63 | (United States) Jimmy Wilburn R | 124.757 | 125.035 | 125.174 | 125.488 | 125.113 | |
| 17 | 5 | (United States) Chet Miller | 124.481 | 124.585 | 124.292 | 125.244 | 124.649 | |
| 18 | 14 | (United States) Harry McQuinn | 125.927 | 124.688 | 124.395 | 123.018 | 124.499 | |
| — | 2 | (United States) Ralph Hepburn | 125.927 | | | | Incomplete | Car quit |

=== Sunday May 26 ===
Ralph Hepburn shattered the one-lap and four-lap track records and became the fastest qualifier in the field. Hepburn returned to the track a day after his car quit during his first attempt. Under cold weather and threatening skies, about 22,500 spectators saw fours drivers complete runs, and the field was filled to 22 cars.

Hepburn's fourth lap was the fastest, a track record 134.449 mph (216.375 km/h), and his four-lap average was a record 133.944 mph (215.562 km/h). Hepburn drove the 8-cylinder front-wheel drive Novi Governor Special, entered by W.S. Winfield.

| Pos | No. | Name | Lap 1 (mph) | Lap 2 (mph) | Lap 3 (mph) | Lap 4 (mph) | Average Speed (mph) | Notes |
|---|---|---|---|---|---|---|---|---|
| 19 | 2 | (United States) Ralph Hepburn | 134.288 | 133.136 | 133.990 | 134.449 | 133.944 | New 1-lap and 4-lap track records; fastest qualifier |
| 20 | 64 | (United States) Shorty Cantlon | 122.900 | 122.183 | 122.666 | 121.984 | 122.432 | |
| 21 | 31 | (United States) Henry Banks | 121.687 | 120.434 | 119.729 | 119.063 | 120.220 | |
| 22 | 15 | (United States) Louis Tomei | 117.955 | 118.483 | 119.872 | 120.498 | 119.193 | |

=== Monday May 27 ===
At the request of many teams, time trials was extended into yet another day, with the track open from 1:00 p.m. to 5:00 p.m. Four cars completed runs, tentatively filling the field to 27 cars. Hal Robson joined his brother George in the field, but the speeds were noticeably down from Sunday's record-breaking efforts.

With only one day remaining to qualify, six positions were tentatively left to be filled.

| Pos | No. | Name | Lap 1 (mph) | Lap 2 (mph) | Lap 3 (mph) | Lap 4 (mph) | Average Speed (mph) | Notes |
|---|---|---|---|---|---|---|---|---|
| 23 | 48 | (United States) Hal Robson R | 121.392 | 120.724 | 121.951 | 121.803 | 121.466 | |
| 24 | 26 | (United States) George Barringer | 122.001 | 120.546 | 120.032 | 119.936 | 120.623 | |
| 25 | 39 | (United States) Bill Sheffler R | 121.049 | 120.838 | 120.417 | 120.144 | 120.611 | |
| — | 37 | (United States) Buddy Rusch R | 116.339 | 116.732 | 116.475 | 115.533 | 116.268 | Bumped on 5/28 |

=== Tuesday May 28 ===
The deadline for qualifications was set at sundown (8:08 p.m.) on Tuesday May 28. When the day opened, six spots were left open in the field. Tony Bettenhausen withdrew his previously qualified car due to a broken crankshaft. He would re-qualify a new car to be the fastest driver of the day.

During a practice run, Caracciola, in one of the Thorne Engineering Specials, lost control and crashed in turn two. He was thrown from the machine, which was badly damaged. Caracciola was seriously injured, and rushed to the hospital. After his release from the hospital, track owner Tony Hulman invited Caracciola to recuperate at his home in Terre Haute.

Danny Kladis was the first driver to complete a run during the afternoon, at a relatively slow pace of 118.890 mph (191.335 km/h). He slipped down the standings as the day progressed, but his speed would hold up and he barely held on to qualify 33rd. Late in the afternoon, Charles Van Acker completed his required four laps at an average of 115.666 mph to fill the field at 33 cars. Buddy Rusch was now "on the bubble", the slowest car in the field. Steve Truchan was the next car out, but he pulled into the pits after only three laps.

Just minutes before sundown, three cars took to the track in an effort to bump their way into the field. Tony Bettenhausen, Billy Devore and George Connor all took to the track at the same time in order to make it in before the deadline. Bettenhausen earned a new spot in the field after withdrawing his previous car. Connor and Devore bumped Buddy Rusch and Charles Van Acker, respectively. One final car, Freddie Winnai made a last-ditch effort to make the field, but the car quit before completing a lap.

| Pos | No. | Name | Lap 1 (mph) | Lap 2 (mph) | Lap 3 (mph) | Lap 4 (mph) | Average Speed (mph) | Notes |
|---|---|---|---|---|---|---|---|---|
| 26 | 42 | (United States) Tony Bettenhausen R | 123.882 | 122.018 | 123.476 | 122.017 | 123.094 | |
| 27 | 4 | (United States) Mel Hansen | 121.098 | 121.163 | 121.000 | 122.482 | 121.431 | |
| 28 | 52 | (Kingdom of Italy) Luigi Villoresi R | 121.441 | 120.530 | 121.147 | 121.885 | 121.249 | |
| 29 | 7 | (United States) Frank Wearne | 121.771 | 120.627 | 121.179 | 121.355 | 121.233 | |
| 30 | 38 | (United States) George Connor | 120.160 | 119.713 | 120.401 | 119.475 | 120.004 | |
| 31 | 17 | (United States) Billy Devore | 120.514 | 120.064 | 119.760 | 119.174 | 119.876 | |
| 32 | 54 | (United States) Duke Nalon | 118.202 | 119.506 | 120.401 | 120.838 | 119.682 | |
| 33 | 59 | (United States) Danny Kladis R | 118.825 | 118.969 | 119.079 | 118.687 | 118.890 | |
| — | x | (United States) Charles Van Acker R | 114.899 | 116.445 | 115.652 | 115.681 | 115.666 | Bumped |
| — | x | (United States) Steve Truchan R | | | | | Incomplete | Pulled in after three laps |
| — | x | (United States) Freddie Winnai | | | | | Incomplete | Car quit |

== Starting grid ==
| Row | Inside | Middle | Outside |
|---|---|---|---|
| 1 | (United States) Cliff Bergere; 126.471 mph (203.535 km/h) | (United States) Paul Russo; 126.183 mph (203.072 km/h) | (United States) Sam Hanks; 124.762 mph (200.785 km/h) |
| 2 | (United States) Hal Cole R 120.728 mph (194.293 km/h) | (United States) Jimmy Jackson R 120.257 mph (193.535 km/h) | (United States) Louis Durant R 118.973 mph (191.468 km/h) |
| 3 | (United States) Ted Horn; 123.980 mph (199.526 km/h) | (United States) Duke Dinsmore R 123.279 mph (198.398 km/h) | (United States) Mauri Rose W 124.065 mph (199.663 km/h) |
| 4 | (United States) Russ Snowberger; 121.593 mph (195.685 km/h) | (United States) Emil Andres; 121.139 mph (194.954 km/h) | (United States) Joie Chitwood; 119.816 mph (192.825 km/h) |
| 5 | (United States) Al Putnam; 116.283 mph (187.139 km/h) | (United States) Rex Mays; 128.861 mph (207.382 km/h) | (United States) George Robson; 125.54 mph (202.04 km/h) |
| 6 | (United States) Jimmy Wilburn R 125.113 mph (201.350 km/h) | (United States) Chet Miller; 124.649 mph (200.603 km/h) | (United States) Harry McQuinn; 124.499 mph (200.362 km/h) |
| 7 | (United States) Ralph Hepburn; 133.944 mph (215.562 km/h) | (United States) Shorty Cantlon; 122.432 mph (197.035 km/h) | (United States) Henry Banks; 120.220 mph (193.475 km/h) |
| 8 | (United States) Louis Tomei; 119.193 mph (191.823 km/h) | (United States) Hal Robson R 121.466 mph (195.481 km/h) | (United States) George Barringer; 120.628 mph (194.132 km/h) |
| 9 | (United States) Bill Sheffler R 120.611 mph (194.105 km/h) | (United States) Tony Bettenhausen R 123.094 mph (198.101 km/h) | (United States) Mel Hansen; 121.431 mph (195.424 km/h) |
| 10 | (Kingdom of Italy) Luigi Villoresi R 121.249 mph (195.131 km/h) | (United States) Frank Wearne; 121.233 mph (195.106 km/h) | (United States) George Connor; 120.006 mph (193.131 km/h) |
| 11 | (United States) Billy Devore; 119.876 mph (192.922 km/h) | (United States) Duke Nalon; 119.682 mph (192.610 km/h) | (United States) Danny Kladis R 118.890 mph (191.335 km/h) |

=== Alternates ===
- First alternate: (United States) Buddy Rusch R (#37) – Bumped (116.268 mph (187.115 km/h))

=== Failed to Qualify ===
- (United States) Charles Van Acker R (#62) – Bumped (115.666 mph (186.146 km/h))
- (United States) Steve Truchan R (#28) – Incomplete run
- (United States) Freddie Winnai (#71) – Incomplete run
- (United Kingdom) Robert Arbuthnot R (#57)
- (Belgium) Zora Arkus-Duntov R (#49)
- (United States) Harold Bailey R (#58)
- (United States) Bud Bardowski R (#37)
- (United States) Gerald Brisko R (#18)
- (United States) Jim Brubaker R (#68)
- (United States) Arvol Brunmeier R (#67)
- (Germany) Rudolf Caracciola R (#44, #72)
- (United States) Bruce Denslow R (#56)
- (France) Louis Gérard R (#36)
- (United States) Tommy Hinnershitz (#34)
- (United States) Joe Langley R (#55)
- (United States) Frank McGurk (#17)
- (United States) Al Miller (#9)
- (United States) Wally Mitchell R (#43)
- (United States) Ray Richards R (#27)
- (United States) Bud Rose R (#69)
- (United States) Harry Schell R (#46)
- (United States) Joel Thorne (#44)
- (Kingdom of Italy) Achille Varzi R (#53)
- (United States) Bus Wilbert R
- (United States) Doc Williams
- (Kingdom of Italy) Dioscoride Lanza R (#74) - Did not appear
- (France) Raphaël Bethenod R (#35) - Did not arrive
- (United States) Joe Silvia R - Did not appear

R = Indianapolis 500 rookie
W = Former Indianapolis 500 winner

== Race summary ==
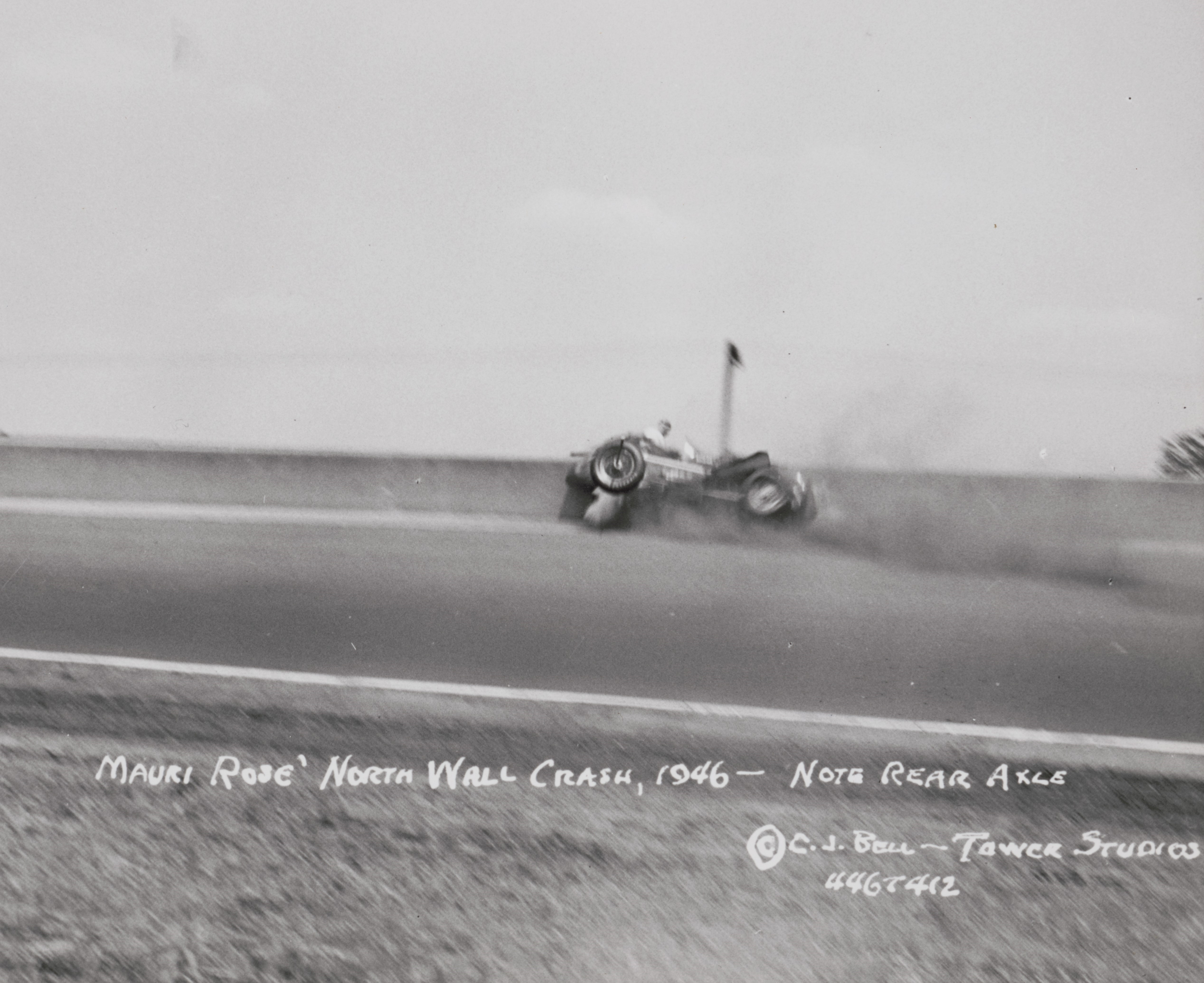
Rose's Turn Three accident on lap 40

At the start, Mauri Rose tied an Indy record by leading the first lap from the 9th starting position. Attrition was high in the first race after World War II, as three of the first four cars on the grid were out before the 50 mile mark (20 laps). Paul Russo crashed in turn 3 on lap 16. Debris, oil, and leaking gasoline at the crash scene necessitated a lengthy caution period. Russo suffered a broken leg, and some other minor injuries. Several other drivers dropped out early with a bevy of mechanical problems, including Sam Hanks, Rex Mays, George Barringer, Henry Banks, and George Connor.

On lap 40, Mauri Rose suffered a heavy crash in turn 3. Rose entered the race as the defending co-winner, having won the 1941 race with Floyd Davis. Rose spun and the car reportedly rolled over the retaining wall. Rose suffered burns, but no critical injuries.

George Robson took the lead for good on lap 93. His six-cylinder Sparks was the first 6-cylinder winning car since Ray Harroun in 1911. Rookie Jimmy Jackson finished second, at the relatively close margin of 34 seconds.

Ted Horn made two lengthy pit stops and fell seven laps behind the last running car. Horn returned to the track, and charged all the way up to third place at the finish. Horn was the fastest car on the track in the second half, and he completed the entire 500 miles, but was 12 minutes behind Robson.

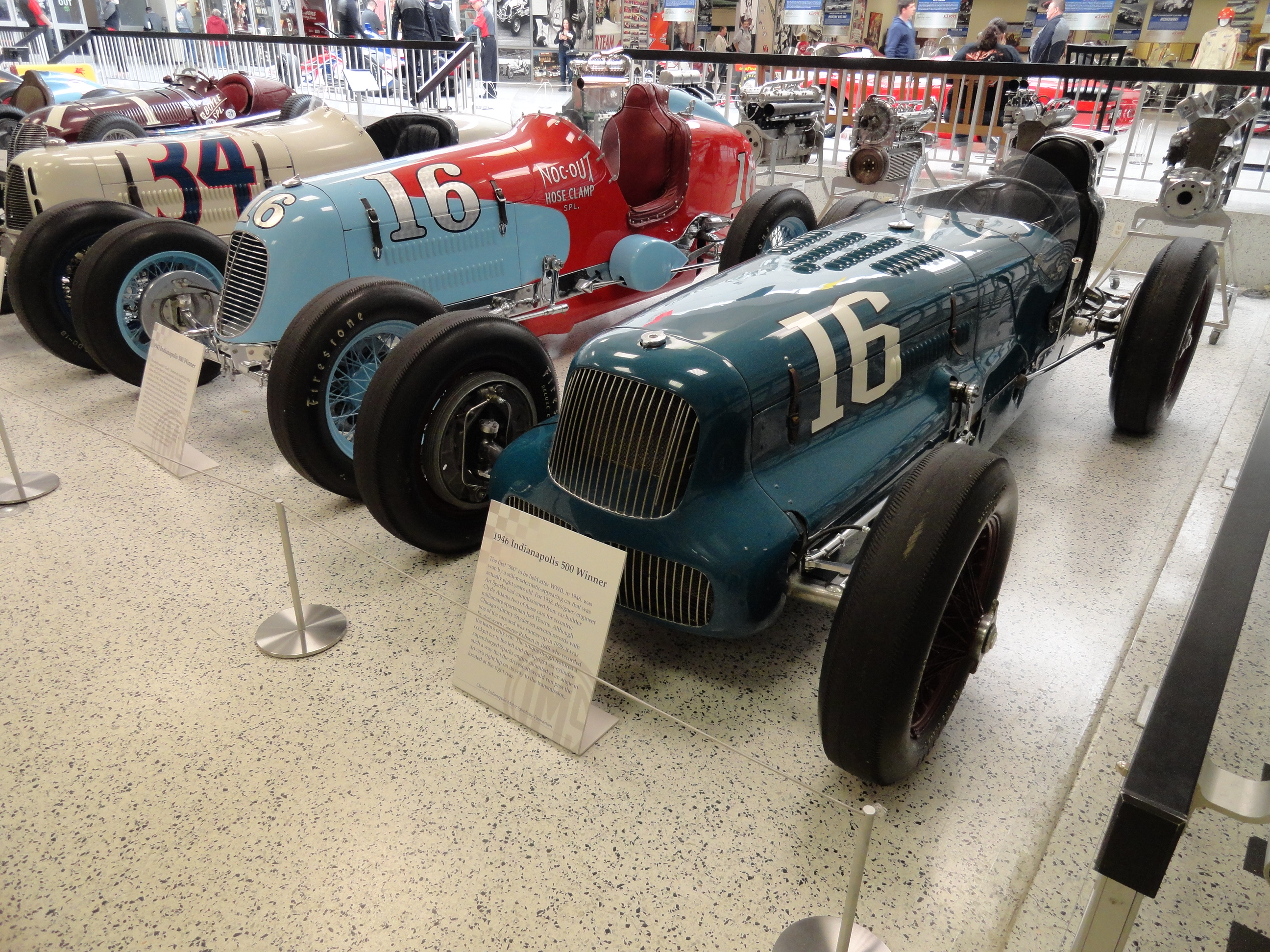
Robson's winning car from the 1946 Indianapolis 500

A mild controversy came about after the race, as race winner Robson was accused of breaking the rules by not exiting the cockpit of the car during pit stops. A protest was filed, but it was later dismissed. Only nine cars were still running at the finish. Rookie Bill Sheffler, running off the pace most of the afternoon, nursed his car to 9th-place finish. Under the rules at the time, all cars still running at the finish were placed ahead all cars that had dropped out - regardless of total laps completed. Sheffler, running a pace of about 60 mph, managed to complete 139 laps before he was flagged off as the last car still running.

== Box score ==
| Finish | Grid | No | Name | Chassis | Engine | Laps | Status |
|---|---|---|---|---|---|---|---|
| 1 | 15 | 16 | (United States) George Robson | Adams | Sparks SC | 200 | 114.820 mph |
| 2 | 5 | 61 | (United States) Jimmy Jackson R | Miller FD | Offenhauser | 200 | +34.04 |
| 3 | 7 | 29 | (United States) Ted Horn | Maserati | Maserati SC | 200 | +11:52.90 |
| 4 | 11 | 18 | (United States) Emil Andres | Maserati | Maserati SC | 200 | +14:01.95 |
| 5 | 12 | 24 | (United States) Joie Chitwood (Sam Hanks Laps 52–200) | Wetteroth | Offenhauser | 200 | +15:18.60 |
| 6 | 6 | 33 | (United States) Louis Durant R | Alfa Romeo | Alfa Romeo SC | 200 | +24:04.18 |
| 7 | 28 | 52 | (Kingdom of Italy) Luigi Villoresi R | Maserati | Maserati SC | 200 | +36:13.53 |
| 8 | 29 | 7 | (United States) Frank Wearne | Shaw | Offenhauser | 197 | Flagged |
| 9 | 25 | 39 | (United States) Bill Sheffler R | Bromme | Offenhauser | 139 | Flagged |
| 10 | 31 | 17 | (United States) Billy Devore | Wetteroth | Offenhauser | 167 | Throttle |
| 11 | 27 | 4 | (United States) Mel Hansen | Kurtis | Novi SC | 143 | Crankshaft |
| 12 | 10 | 25 | (United States) Russ Snowberger (Duke Nalon Laps 90–134) | Maserati | Maserati SC | 134 | Differential |
| 13 | 18 | 14 | (United States) Harry McQuinn (Jimmy Wilburn Laps 90–124) | Adams | Sparks SC | 124 | Out of oil |
| 14 | 19 | 2 | (United States) Ralph Hepburn | Kurtis | Novi SC | 121 | Stalled |
| 15 | 13 | 12 | (United States) Al Putnam (George Connor Laps 100–120) | Hartz | Offenhauser | 120 | Magneto |
| 16 | 1 | 3 | (United States) Cliff Bergere (Rex Mays Laps 60–82) | Wetteroth | Offenhauser | 82 | Out of oil |
| 17 | 8 | 45 | (United States) Duke Dinsmore R | Adams | Offenhauser | 82 | Rod |
| 18 | 17 | 5 | (United States) Chet Miller (Louis Tomei Laps 58–64) | Williams FD | Offenhauser | 64 | Oil line |
| 19 | 16 | 63 | (United States) Jimmy Wilburn R | Alfa Romeo 8C35 | Alfa Romeo | 52 | Engine |
| 20 | 26 | 42 | (United States) Tony Bettenhausen R | Miller-Hartz | Miller SC | 47 | Rod |
| 21 | 33 | 59 | (United States) Danny Kladis R | Miller FD | Ford V8 | 46 | Towed |
| 22 | 32 | 54 | (United States) Duke Nalon | Maserati 4CL | Maserati SC | 45 | Universal joint |
| 23 | 9 | 8 | (United States) Mauri Rose W | Lencki | Offenhauser | 40 | Crash T3 |
| 24 | 30 | 38 | (United States) George Connor | Kurtis FWD | Offenhauser | 38 | Piston |
| 25 | 23 | 48 | (United States) Hal Robson R | Bugatti | Miller | 37 | Rod |
| 26 | 22 | 15 | (United States) Louis Tomei | Stevens FD | Brisko | 34 | Oil line |
| 27 | 21 | 31 | (United States) Henry Banks | Snowberger FD | Offenhauser | 32 | Pinion shaft |
| 28 | 20 | 64 | (United States) Shorty Cantlon | Miller ED | Offenhauser | 28 | Clutch |
| 29 | 24 | 26 | (United States) George Barringer | Miller 4DRE | Miller SC | 27 | Gears |
| 30 | 14 | 1 | (United States) Rex Mays | Stevens | Winfield | 26 | Manifold |
| 31 | 3 | 32 | (United States) Sam Hanks | Sampson | Sampson SC | 18 | Oil line |
| 32 | 4 | 47 | (United States) Hal Cole R | Alfa Romeo P3 | Alfa Romeo SC | 16 | Fuel leak |
| 33 | 2 | 10 | (United States) Paul Russo | Fageol 4WD | Twin Offenhauser | 16 | Crash T3 |

Note: Relief drivers in parentheses

W Former Indianapolis 500 winner

R Indianapolis 500 Rookie

All entrants utilized Firestone tires.

=== Statistics ===
Lap Leaders
| Leader | Laps |
|---|---|
| Mauri Rose | 1–8 |
| Rex Mays | 9–11 |
| Ralph Hepburn | 12–55 |
| George Robson | 56–68 |
| Cliff Bergere | 69–70 |
| George Robson | 71–87 |
| Jimmy Jackson | 88–92 |
| George Robson | 93–200 |

Total laps led
| Leader | Laps |
|---|---|
| George Robson | 138 |
| Ralph Hepburn | 44 |
| Mauri Rose | 8 |
| Jimmy Jackson | 5 |
| Rex Mays | 3 |
| Cliff Bergere | 2 |

Yellow Lights: 34 minutes, 1 second
| Laps* | Reason |
|---|---|
| 16–36 | Paul Russo crash in turn 3 |
| 40 | Mauri Rose crash in turn 3 |
* – Approximate lap counts

== Broadcasting ==
=== Radio ===
The race was carried live on the Mutual Broadcasting System. The broadcast was sponsored by Perfect Circle Piston Rings and Bill Slater served as the anchor. The broadcast featured live coverage of the start, the finish, and live updates throughout the race.

Mutual Broadcasting System
| Booth Announcers | Turn Reporters | Pit/garage reporters |
|---|---|---|
| Booth Announcer: Bill Slater; Analyst: Norman Perry Jr. Commercials: Rance MacFarland | South turns: Easy Gwynn; Mainstretch: Carl Page; North turns: Jim Shelton | Gene Kelly |

== See also ==
- 1946 AAA Championship Car season

=== Works cited ===
- Indianapolis 500 History: Race & All-Time Stats – Official Site
- 1946 Indianapolis 500 Radio Broadcast, Mutual: Re-broadcast on "The All-Night Race Party" - WFNI (May 28, 2011)

=== References ===
| 1941 Indianapolis 500; Mauri Rose; Floyd Davis | 1946 Indianapolis 500; George Robson | 1947 Indianapolis 500; Mauri Rose |
