= Jimmy Wilburn =

American racing driver (1908–1984)

- Born: James Thomas Wilburn Jr. November 25, 1908 Los Angeles County, California, U.S.
- Died: August 26, 1984 (aged 75) Bradenton, Florida, U.S.

Champ Car career
- 1 race run over 1 year
- First race: 1946 Indianapolis 500 (Indianapolis)
Wins	Podiums	Poles
0	0	0

James Thomas Wilburn Jr. (November 25, 1908 – August 26, 1984) was an American racing driver from Los Angeles County. He won a non-championship race during the 1946 AAA Championship Car season - the inaugural race of an anomalous season marking the return of racing after the Second World War. Later that year Wilburn raced in the 1946 Indianapolis 500, driving an Alfa Romeo, starting 16th and retiring after 52 laps with engine trouble, finishing 19th.

== Racing career ==
Wilburn raced based out of Portland, Oregon in the early 1930s. He moved to the Oakland, California-based American Racing Association (ARA) before returning to the Los Angeles area to compete in the Western Racing Association (WRA). Wilburn next moved to Indianapolis along with Travis "Spider" Webb in 1936, where the duo began competing in Central States Racing Association (CSRA) events in a "big car" (now sprint car). Wilburn won the 1938 CSRA championship and he won his second CSRA championship in 1939. He repeated for his third straight championship in 1940. In 1941, he won several big shows including an IMCA show at Reading, Pennsylvania and twice at Des Moines, Iowa. At the IMCA season finale on October 21 at the Louisiana State Fairgrounds, he was battling Gus Schrader when Schrader died in an accident. Schrader's car pushed up the track and clipped Wilburn's tire causing Schrader's to flip end-over-end.

Racing resumed following the end of the Second World War; a few events were run in 1945 and Wilburn won in front of a large CSRA crowd of over 124,000 people at Allentown Fairgrounds. Wilburn returned to CSRA in 1946 and won the championship. He won all four IMCA events at the Iowa State Fairgrounds that year. That year he competed in the Indianapolis 500; he finished 19th. In 1947, he won the CSRA championship and finished second to Emory Collins.

In July 1948, Wilburn flipped his Offenhauser at Oskaloosa, Iowa and he was unconscious for several weeks. He returned to racing in 1949; he finished third in the IMCA points behind Frank Luptow and Collins. Wilburn won the 1950 CSRA championship before retiring from racing.

== Personal life ==
Wilburn moved with his second wife, Mary, whom he married in 1939, to Florida after retiring from racing. He died on August 26, 1984.

== Awards and honors ==
Wilburn was inducted in the National Sprint Car Hall of Fame in 1994.

== Motorsports career results ==
=== Indianapolis 500 results ===
Year	Car	Start	Qual	Rank	Finish	Laps	Led	Retired
1946	63	16	125.113	6	19	52	0	Engine
Totals						52	0	

Starts	1
Poles	0
Front Row	0
Wins	0
Top 5	0
Top 10	0
Retired	1
