= Duke Nalon =

American racing driver (1913–2001)

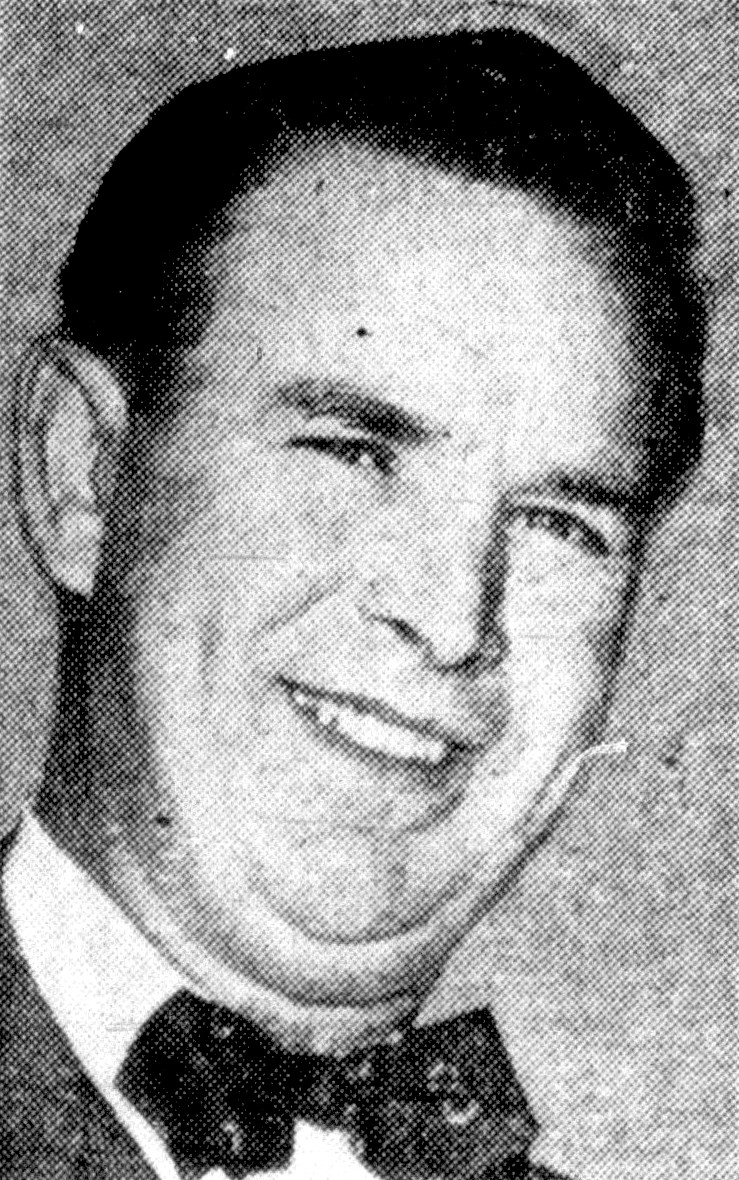
- Nalon, circa 1951
- Born: Dennis Clayton Nalon; March 2, 1913 Chicago, Illinois, U.S.
- Died: February 26, 2001 (aged 87) Indianapolis, Indiana, U.S.

Championship titles
- AAA Eastern Big Car (1938); AAA Midwest Big Car (1941)

Champ Car career
- 34+ races run over 16 years
- Best finish: 5th (1948)
- First race: 1937 Syracuse 100 (Syracuse)
- Last race: 1953 Indianapolis 500 (Indianapolis)
Wins	Podiums	Poles
0	6	3

Formula One World Championship career
- Active years: 1950–1954
- Team: Kurtis Kraft
- Entries: 5 (3 starts)
- Championships: 0
- Wins: 0
- Podiums: 0
- Career points: 0
- Pole positions: 1
- Fastest laps: 0
- First entry: 1950 Indianapolis 500
- Last entry: 1954 Indianapolis 500

Dennis Clayton "Duke" Nalon (March 2, 1913 – February 26, 2001) was an American racing driver. He competed in midget car, sprint car, and Indy car races. Nicknamed "The Iron Duke," Nalon was part of the "Chicago Gang" along with Tony Bettenhausen and others. These racers toured tracks in the Midwest and East Coast of the United States.

== Racing career ==
Nalon began as a pit crew member for Wally Zale. Nalon occasionally warmed up the car. When Walter Galven needed a driver, Zale convinced Galven to allow Nalon to race. Nalon won the feature event.

=== Midget cars ===
Nalon won races on the United States' East Coast in the 1930s. Nalon competed in midget cars throughout his career. He ran his final career race at the only 100-mile (160 km) midget race ever run at Terre Haute. He raced Johnny Pawl’s famous midget to victory. He ended his career the way he started it: with a win.

=== Sprint cars ===
Nalon won the 1938 East Coast AAA Sprint car championship; he won the Midwestern championship in 1941.

=== Indy cars ===
Nalon started ten Indianapolis 500-mile (800 km) races, finishing only three. He started from the pole twice, and was twice the fastest qualifier. In the 1947 Indianapolis 500, he competed in a pre-war Mercedes-Benz W154 Grand Prix car. He also competed in numerous other events on what was them termed the Championship car circuit. In 1949, Nalon was involved in a massive, fiery crash in Turn 3 of the Indianapolis Motor Speedway. He backed into the wall and the car burst into flames. He survived only because he held his breath (to prevent asphyxiation), and he jumped out of the car while it was still moving. He had severe burns to his legs which gave him trouble until his death in 2001.

==== World Drivers' Championship career ====
The AAA/USAC-sanctioned Indianapolis 500 was included in the FIA World Drivers' Championship from 1950 through 1960. Drivers competing at Indianapolis during those years were credited with World Drivers' Championship participation, and were eligible to score WDC points alongside those which they may have scored towards the AAA/USAC National Championship.

Nalon participated in three World Drivers' Championship races at Indianapolis. His best finish was tenth place, and he qualified on the pole once. He scored no World Drivers' Championship points.

== Awards and honors ==
- He was inducted in the National Midget Auto Racing Hall of Fame in 1987.
- He was named to the National Sprint Car Hall of Fame in 1991.
- In 2015, he was inducted in the Motorsports Hall of Fame of America.

== Motorsports career results ==
=== Indianapolis 500 results ===
Year	Car	Start	Qual	Rank	Finish	Laps	Led	Retired
1938	43	33	113.828	33	11	178	0	Flagged
1940	21	25	121.790	24	22	120	0	Rod
1941	17	30	122.951	17	15	173	0	Flagged
1946	54	32	119.682	29	22	45	0	Universal joint
1947	46	18	128.082	2	16	119	0	Piston
1948	54	11	131.603	1	**3rd**	200	9	Running
1949	54	1	132.939	1	29	23	23	Crash T3
1951	18	1	136.498	2	10	151	0	Stalled BS
1952	36	4	136.188	8	25	84	0	Supercharger
1953	9	26	135.461	30	11	191	0	Spun T3
**Totals**						1284	32	

Starts	10
Poles	2
Front Row	2
Wins	0
Top 5	1
Top 10	2
Retired	7

=== FIA World Drivers' Championship results ===
(key) (Races in bold indicate pole position)

Year	Entrant	Chassis	Engine	1	2	3	4	5	6	7	8	9	WDC	Points
1950	Novi Mobil	Kurtis Kraft	Novi L8	GBR	MON	500; DNQ	SUI	BEL	FRA	ITA			NC	0
1951	Novi Purelube	Kurtis Kraft	Novi L8	SUI	**500**; 10	BEL	FRA	GBR	GER	ITA	ESP		NC	0
1952	Novi Pure Oil	Kurtis Kraft	Novi L8	SUI	500; 25	BEL	FRA	GBR	GER	NED	ITA		NC	0
1953	Novi Governor	Kurtis Kraft	Novi L8	ARG	500; 11	NED	BEL	FRA	GBR	GER	SUI	ITA	NC	0
1954	Novi Pure Oil	Kurtis Kraft	Novi L8	ARG	500; DNQ	BEL	FRA	GBR	GER	SUI	ITA	ESP	NC	0
