= Pete Romcevich =

Serbian-American racecar driver

Pete Romcevich (July 7, 1906–September 7, 1952) was a Serbian-American racecar driver. He was born Slavko Romčević to a Serbian family in the small village of Stipan near Lasinja, Croatia in what was then the Kingdom of Yugoslavija . Romcevich arrived to the United States in 1922 as a 16-year old, joining his brother, Gjuro (George) Romčević who emigrated and arrived in the United States first. George saved money and sent for Pete. Romcevich had a successful midget car racing career and fabricated racing cars at his Speedway Garage in Roby, Indiana (now part of Hammond, Indiana). He qualified and raced in the 1947 Indianapolis 500 driving a car owned by Anthony "Andy" Granatelli and attempted to qualify again in one of Granatelli's cars before a crash during qualifying. He was killed in a midget race at the Michigan State Fairgrounds Speedway in Detroit when his car went out of control.

== Indianapolis 500 results ==
Year	Car	Start	Qual	Rank	Finish	Laps	Led	Retired
1947	59	17	117.218	28	12	168	0	Oil line
Totals						168	0	

Starts	1
Poles	0
Front Row	0
Wins	0
Top 5	0
Top 10	0
Retired	1
