= Bill Sheffler =

American racing driver (1917–1949)

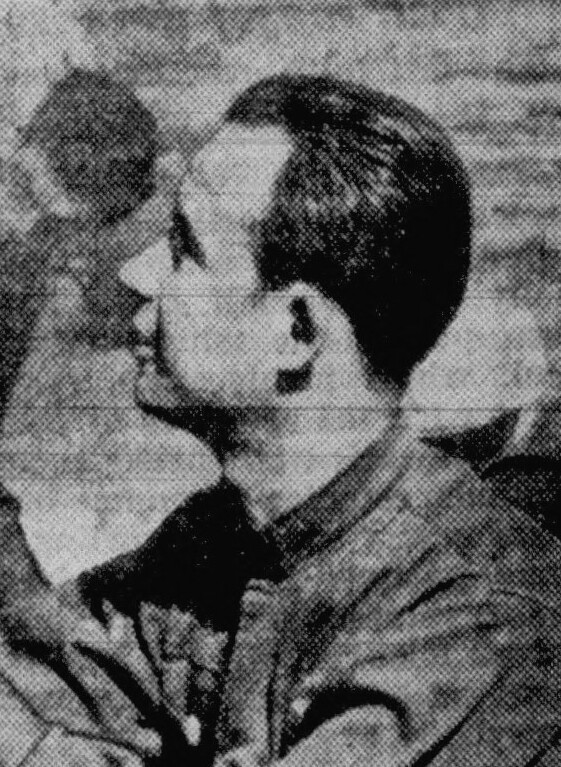
- Sheffler, circa 1942
- Born: Bayard Taylor Sheffler; August 23, 1917 El Paso, Texas, U.S.
- Died: June 28, 1949 (aged 31) Trenton, New Jersey, U.S.

Champ Car career
- 15 races run over 3 years
- Best finish: 4th (1948)
- First race: 1946 Indianapolis 500 (Indianapolis)
- Last race: 1949 Milwaukee 100 (Milwaukee)
Wins	Podiums	Poles
0	2	0

Bayard Taylor "Bill" Sheffler (August 23, 1917 – June 28, 1949) was an American racing driver active during the 1940s.

Sheffler attended the University of Southern California, where he was a pole vaulter on the track team. He began racing in Southern California, and was a dominant driver in big car races at Southern Ascot Speedway in South Gate, California prior to World War II.

Sheffler made 15 AAA Championship Car starts, including the 1946 Indianapolis 500 where he finished ninth, and 11 races in 1948, when he finished fourth in the National Championship. He died from injuries sustained in a practice crash prior to the 1949 Championship Car race at Trenton Speedway.

== Motorsports career results ==
=== Indianapolis 500 results ===
Year	Car	Start	Qual	Rank	Finish	Laps	Led	Retired
1946	39	25	120.611	23	9	139	0	Flagged
1948	53	24	124.529	17	18	132	0	Spark plugs
1949	4	22	128.521	10	17	160	0	Rod
Totals						431	0	

Starts	3
Poles	0
Front Row	0
Wins	0
Top 5	0
Top 10	1
Retired	2
