= Milt Fankhouser =

American racing driver (1915–1970)

Milton Carl Fankhauser (29 October 1915 in New York City – 26 February 1970 in Santa Barbara, California) was an American racecar driver.

== Indy 500 results ==
Year	Car	Start	Qual	Rank	Finish	Laps	Led	Retired
1947	53	11	119.932	21	30	15	0	Stalled
Totals						15	0	

Starts	1
Poles	0
Front Row	0
Wins	0
Top 5	0
Top 10	0
Retired	1
