= George Lynch (racing driver) =

American racing driver (1918–1997)

- Born: George John Lynch; June 20, 1918 Miles City, Montana, U.S.
- Died: May 6, 1997 (aged 78) Los Angeles, California, U.S.

Champ Car career
- 13 races run over 7 years
- Best finish: 39th (tie) (1948)
- First race: 1948 Milwaukee 100 (Milwaukee)
- Last race: 1950 Darlington 200 (Darlington)
Wins	Podiums	Poles
0	0	0

George John Lynch (June 20, 1918 – May 6, 1997) was an American racing driver.

== Early life ==
Lynch was born in Miles City, Montana to John James Lynch and Violet P. Palcet Enduring a rough childhood that saw his parents divorce, he was reared by his paternal grandmother in Nekoosa, Wisconsin, where Lynch bought a used open-wheel race car for $100 and began racing, even before obtaining his civilian driver's license.

== Racing career ==
=== Early racing career ===
Lynch's racing career spanned three decades, from 1935 through 1957. He completed over 300 races, primarily in open-wheel midget and sprint cars on small tracks primarily in the Midwestern United States. Lynch won few of his races but, in his own words, "pushed a lot of guys over the finish line." His aggressive driving style, characterized by bumping slower cars, earned him nicknames such as "Leadfoot Lynch" and "Red Devil."

=== Military service ===
Lynch's racing career was briefly interrupted in 1944 when Lynch enlisted in the United States Army, where he was a member of the American occupation force in Japan. During his tour, he earned his jump wings and joined the 11th Airborne Division. He was honorably discharged in 1946.

=== Return to racing ===
The highlight of Lynch's career was his participation in the 1949 Indianapolis 500. He qualified in eighth position with a speed of 127.820 mph (205.706 km/h). He crashed into the wall on the first turn of the second lap and held the record for the shortest completed lap at Indy until 1964. Footage of Lynch's crash, along with other action from that race, was used in the 1949 motion picture The Big Wheel starring Mickey Rooney and Spring Byington.

After a failed attempt to qualify for the 1950 Indianapolis 500, Lynch continued racing sprint and midget cars around the country, eventually bringing him to California. He participated in the 1951 Mexican Road Race, which was chronicled in the movie La Carrera Panamericana. He also participated in the early days of the newly-formed National Association for Stock Car Auto Racing (now known as NASCAR).

Lynch always said that he would quit racing when he became "too careful," especially in turns. That day came during a sprint car race in 1957, and Lynch immediately retired.

== Post-racing career ==
Lynch spent his remaining years in southern California as an auto mechanic, fisherman, and ambassador of auto racing.

== Personal life ==
Lynch was married five times and had five children: George Jr. a.k.a. "Butch" (died April 2022), Georgianna a.k.a. Jeanette (died October 1969), Roberta, James Hughen, and Neil. After a long struggle with Alzheimer's disease, Lynch died in Los Angeles on May 7, 1997.

== Motorsports career results ==
=== Indianapolis 500 results ===
Year	Car	Start	Qual	Rank	Finish	Laps	Led	Retired
1949	26	8	127.823	16	32	1	0	Crash T1
Totals						1	0	

Starts	1
Poles	0
Front Row	0
Wins	0
Top 5	0
Top 10	0
Retired	1
