= Doc Williams (racing driver) =

American racing driver (1912–1982)

- Born: Merril Henry Williams; October 26, 1912 Indianapolis, Indiana, U.S.
- Died: April 28, 1982 (aged 69) Richmond, Indiana, U.S.

Champ Car career
- 4 races run over 12 years
- First race: 1936 Indianapolis 500 (Indianapolis)
- Last race: 1948 Indianapolis 500 (Indianapolis)
Wins	Podiums	Poles
0	0	0

Merril Henry "Doc" Williams (October 26, 1912 – April 28, 1982) was an American racing driver.

== Racing career ==
Williams attempted to qualify for the Indianapolis 500 every year from 1933 to 1941 but only succeeded in qualifying in 1936, 1940, and 1941. When the race returned in 1946 after the Second World War, Williams again failed to qualify. In 1947, he qualified a Novi powered Kurtis but it was driven by Herb Ardinger, who finished fpurth, completing all 200 laps. He qualified again in 1948 but was knocked out of the race after 19 laps. He failed to qualify in 1949 and it was the end of his Championship car career. Williams did not attempt to qualify for any Championship Car races other than the Indianapolis 500.

== Motorsports career results ==
=== Indianapolis 500 results ===
Year	Car	Start	Qual	Rank	Finish	Laps	Led	Retired
1936	54	23	112.837	26	16	192	0	Out of gas
1940	36	19	122.963	15	25	61	0	Oil line
1941	36	5	124.014	9	24	68	0	Radiator
1947	54	4	120.733	Did Not Start				
1948	74	6	124.151	20	29	19	0	Clutch
Totals						340	0	

Starts	4
Poles	0
Front Row	0
Wins	0
Top 5	0
Top 10	0
Retired	4
