= Hal Cole =

American racing driver (1912–1970)

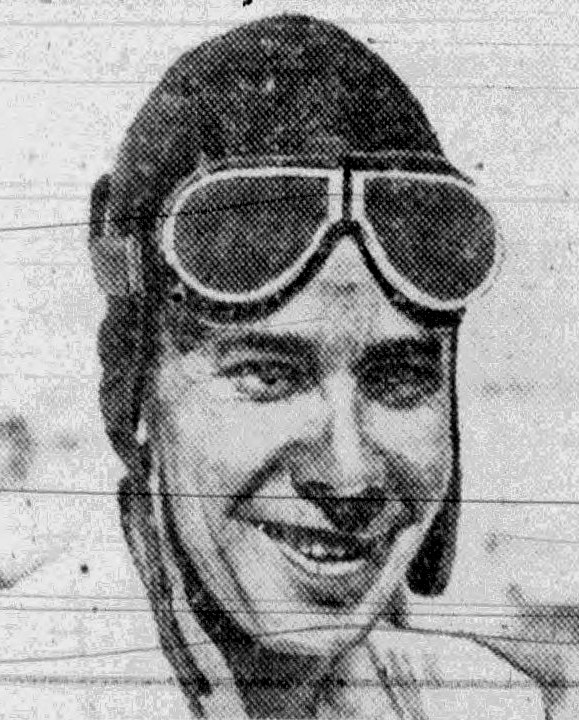
- Cole, circa 1941
- Born: Harold Cole; November 20, 1912 Pomona, California, U.S.
- Died: November 12, 1970 (aged 57) Los Angeles County, California, U.S.

Champ Car career
- 8 races run over 4 years
- First race: 1946 Indianapolis 500 (Indianapolis)
- Last race: 1949 Del Mar 100 (Del Mar)
Wins	Podiums	Poles
0	0	0

NASCAR Cup Series career
- 4 races run over 1 year
- First race: 1951 Race 6 (Phoenix)
- Last race: 1951 Race 37 (Hanford)
Wins	Top tens	Poles
0	1	0

Formula One World Championship career
- Active years: 1950
- Team: Kurtis Kraft
- Entries: 1 (0 starts)
- Championships: 0
- Wins: 0
- Podiums: 0
- Career points: 0
- Pole positions: 0
- Fastest laps: 0
- First entry: 1950 Indianapolis 500
- Last entry: 1950 Indianapolis 500

Harold Cole (November 20, 1912 – November 12, 1970) was an American racing driver.

== World Drivers' Championship career ==
The AAA/USAC-sanctioned Indianapolis 500 was included in the FIA World Drivers' Championship from 1950 through 1960. Drivers competing at Indianapolis during those years were credited with World Drivers' Championship participation, and were eligible to score WDC points alongside those which they may have scored towards the AAA/USAC National Championship.

Cole attempted to qualify for one World Drivers' Championship race at Indianapolis, failing to make the 1950 race.

== Motorsports career results ==
=== Indianapolis 500 results ===
Year	Car	Start	Qual	Rank	Finish	Laps	Led	Retired
1946	47	4	120.728	21	32	16	0	Fuel leak
1948	63	14	124.391	18	6	200	0	Running
1949	14	11	127.168	24	19	117	0	Rod bearing
Totals						333	0	

Starts	3
Poles	0
Front Row	0
Wins	0
Top 5	0
Top 10	1
Retired	2

=== FIA World Drivers' Championship results ===
(key)

Year	Entrant	Chassis	Engine	1	2	3	4	5	6	7	WDC	Points
1950	Tuffy's Offy	Kurtis Kraft 2000	Offenhauser L4	GBR	MON	500; DNQ	SUI	BEL	FRA	ITA	NC	0
