= Les Anderson (racing driver) =

American racing driver

Leslie Merden Anderson (17 April 1910 – 10 July 1949) was an American racecar driver. He was killed in a two car collision with Art George at the Portland Speedway. Anderson was taken to the Emanuel Hospital without regaining consciousness. He died at 7:30 pm the same evening. Art George survived the accident.

== Indy 500 results ==
Year	Car	Start	Qual	Rank	Finish	Laps	Led	Retired
1947	58	7	118.425	24	11	131	0	Flagged
1948	34	9	122.337	30	24	58	0	Gears
Totals						189	0	

Starts	2
Poles	0
Front Row	0
Wins	0
Top 5	0
Top 10	0
Retired	1
