= Louis Tomei =

American racing driver (1909–1955)

- Born: Luigi Gilaberto Tomei; February 17, 1909 Portland, Oregon, U.S.
- Died: May 15, 1955 (aged 46) Los Angeles, California, U.S.

Champ Car career
- 10 races run over 12 years
- Best finish: 14th (1941)
- First race: 1932 Oakland 150 (Oakland)
- Last race: 1946 Indianapolis 500 (Indianapolis)
Wins	Podiums	Poles
0	0	0

Louis Gilbert Tomei (born Luigi Gilaberto Tomei, February 10, 1909 or February 17, 1909 – May 15, 1955) was an American racing driver active during the 1930s and 1940s, and a stuntman active during the 1940s and 1950s.

== Stunt performer ==
After World War II, Tomei worked as a stuntman and bit-part actor. His most notable appearance was in A Star is Born (1954). The following year, he died doubling for actor Edward G. Robinson during the filming of the movie Hell on Frisco Bay. Tomei was performing a fight scene on a motorboat that marked the climax of the movie when he was hurled against a metal fitting on the boat. He suffered a severe head injury, and died in hospital later that night.

Tomei was not related to the actresses Concetta Tomei or Marisa Tomei.

== Motorsports career results ==
=== Indianapolis 500 results ===
Year	Car	Start	Qual	Rank	Finish	Laps	Led	Retired
1935	26	32	110.794	32	28	47	0	Valve
1936	27	8	111.078	33	27	44	0	Engine support
1937	53	18	116.437	32	10	200	0	Running
1938	21	24	121.599	10	23	88	0	Rod
1939	58	30	118.426	30	15	186	0	Flagged
1940	26	18	119.980	32	16	190	0	Exhaust pipe
1941	53	24	121.070	26	11	200	0	Running
1946	15	22	119.193	30	26	34	0	Oil line
Totals						989	0	

Starts	8
Poles	0
Front Row	0
Wins	0
Top 5	0
Top 10	1
Retired	5

== Filmography ==
Year	Title	Role	Notes
1942	Spy Smasher	Joe, Warehouse Thug	Serial, [Ch. 8], Uncredited
1950	The Flame and the Arrow	Guard	Uncredited
1951	Excuse My Dust	Race Driver	Uncredited
1952	Army Bound	Herb Turner	
1952	The Iron Mistress	Heacock	Uncredited
1953	Jalopy	Jalopy Driver	Uncredited
1953	Jeopardy	Officer at 2nd Barricade	Uncredited
1953	The Charge at Feather River	Pvt. Curry	
1954	Phantom of the Rue Morgue	Albert	Voice, Uncredited
1954	A Star is Born	Signboard Man #1	Uncredited
1954	The Silver Chalice	Bystander	Uncredited
1955	The Prodigal	Abu	Uncredited, (final film role)
