= Jimmy Jackson (racing driver) =

American racing driver (1910–1984)

- Born: James Merriman Jackson; July 25, 1910 Indianapolis, Indiana, U.S.
- Died: November 25, 1984 (aged 74) Desert Hot Springs, California, U.S.

Champ Car career
- 6 races run over 7 years
- Best finish: 7th (1946)
- First race: 1946 Indianapolis 500 (Indianapolis)
- Last race: 1951 Pikes Peak Hill Climb (Pikes Peak)
Wins	Podiums	Poles
0	1	0

Formula One World Championship career
- Active years: 1950, 1952, 1954
- Team: Kurtis Kraft
- Entries: 3 (2 starts)
- Championships: 0
- Wins: 0
- Podiums: 0
- Career points: 0
- Pole positions: 0
- Fastest laps: 0
- First entry: 1950 Indianapolis 500
- Last entry: 1954 Indianapolis 500

James Merriman Jackson (July 25, 1910 – November 25, 1984) was an American racing driver.

== World Drivers' Championship career ==
The AAA/USAC-sanctioned Indianapolis 500 was included in the FIA World Drivers' Championship from 1950 through 1960. Drivers competing at Indianapolis during those years were credited with World Drivers' Championship participation, and were eligible to score WDC points alongside those which they may have scored towards the AAA/USAC National Championship.

Jackson participated in two World Drivers' Championship races at Indianapolis. His best finish was 15th place, and he scored no World Drivers' Championship points.

== Motorsports career results ==
=== Indianapolis 500 results ===
Year	Car	Start	Qual	Rank	Finish	Laps	Led	Retired
1946	61	5	120.257	24	2	200	5	Running
1947	7	10	122.266	11	5	200	0	Running
1948	61	4	127.510	7	10	193	0	Spindle
1949	61	7	128.023	15	6	200	0	Running
1950	61	32	129.208	33	29	52	0	Supercharger
1954*	16	-	-	-	15	57/196	0	Running
Totals						845	5	

Starts	5
Poles	0
Front Row	0
Wins	0
Top 5	2
Top 10	4
Retired	2

* shared drive with Duane Carter

== Personal life ==
Jackson was a graduate of Arsenal Technical High School. He painted his 1946 Indianapolis 500 entry green, as gesture to the school's colors, and finished second.

Jackson died of a heart attack on November 25, 1984, aged 74.
