= Billy Devore =

American racing driver (1910–1985)

- Born: Louis Wiley Devore; September 12, 1910 Los Angeles, California, U.S.
- Died: August 12, 1985 (aged 74) Brownsburg, Indiana, U.S.

Champ Car career
- 18 races run over 12 years
- Best finish: 6th (1938)
- First race: 1937 Indianapolis 500 (Indianapolis)
- Last race: 1949 DuQuoin 100 (DuQuoin)
Wins	Podiums	Poles
0	0	0

Formula One World Championship career
- Active years: 1950, 1954
- Team(s): Scopa, Kurtis Kraft
- Entries: 2 (0 starts)
- Championships: 0
- Wins: 0
- Podiums: 0
- Career points: 0
- Pole positions: 0
- Fastest laps: 0
- First entry: 1950 Indianapolis 500
- Last entry: 1954 Indianapolis 500

Louis Wiley "Billy" Devore (occasionally spelt DeVore, September 12, 1910 – August 12, 1985) was an American racing driver. He was the son of Indy car racer Earl Devore.

== World Drivers' Championship career ==
The AAA/USAC-sanctioned Indianapolis 500 was included in the FIA World Drivers' Championship from 1950 through 1960. Drivers competing at Indianapolis during those years were credited with World Drivers' Championship participation, and were eligible to score WDC points alongside those which they may have scored towards the AAA/USAC National Championship.

Devore attempted to qualify for two World Drivers' Championship races at Indianapolis, failing to make the 1950 and 1954 races.

== Motorsports career results ==
=== Indianapolis 500 results ===
Year	Car	Start	Qual	Rank	Finish	Laps	Led	Retired
1937	28	14	120.192	9	7	200	0	Running
1938	58	30	116.339	30	8	185	0	Flagged
1939	26	33	116.527	33	10	200	0	Running
1940	14	32	122.197	21	18	181	0	Flagged
1941	23	8	121.770	21	19	121	0	Rod
1946	17	31	119.876	27	10	167	0	Throttle
1948	19	20	123.967	21	12	190	0	Flagged
Totals						1244	0	

Starts	7
Poles	0
Front Row	0
Wins	0
Top 5	0
Top 10	4
Retired	2

=== FIA World Drivers' Championship results ===
(key)

Year	Entrant	Chassis	Engine	1	2	3	4	5	6	7	8	9	WDC	Points
1950	Joe Scopa	Scopa	Offenhauser L4	GBR	MON	500; DNQ	SUI	BEL	FRA	ITA			NC	0
1954	Youngstown White Truck	Kurtis Kraft 3000	Offenhauser L4	ARG	500; DNQ	BEL	FRA	GBR	GER	SUI	ITA	ESP	NC	0
