= 1940 AAA Championship Car season =

Sports season

- AAA National Championship Trail

Season
- Races: 3
- Start date: May 30
- End date: September 2

Awards
- National champion: (United States) Rex Mays
- Indianapolis 500 winner: (United States) Wilbur Shaw

The 1940 AAA Championship Car season consisted of three races, beginning in Speedway, Indiana on May 30 and concluding in Syracuse, New York on September 2. There was also one non-championship event in Langhorne, Pennsylvania. The AAA National Champion was Rex Mays and the Indianapolis 500 winner was Wilbur Shaw.

George Bailey died in practice at Indianapolis before the race. Lou Webb died during the season ending race at Syracuse.

== Schedule and results ==
All races running on Paved/Dirt Oval.

Rnd	Date	Race name	Track	Location	Type	Pole position	Winning driver
1	May 30	(United States) International 500 Mile Sweepstakes	Indianapolis Motor Speedway	Speedway, Indiana	Paved	(United States) Rex Mays	(United States) Wilbur Shaw
NC	June 16	(United States) Langhorne 100	Langhorne Speedway	Langhorne, Pennsylvania	Dirt	(United States) Tony Willman	(United States) Duke Nalon
2	August 24	(United States) Springfield 100	Illinois State Fairgrounds	Springfield, Illinois	Dirt	(United States) Rex Mays	(United States) Rex Mays
3	September 2	(United States) Syracuse 100	New York State Fairgrounds	Syracuse, New York	Dirt	(United States) Rex Mays	(United States) Rex Mays

Non-championship race

== Final points standings ==
Note: Drivers had to be running at the finish to score points. Points scored by drivers sharing a ride were split according to percentage of race driven. Starters were not allowed to score points as relief drivers, if a race starter finished the race in another car, in a points scoring position, those points were awarded to the driver who had started the car.
The final standings based on reference.

Pos	Driver	INDY (United States)	SPR (United States)	SYR (United States)	Pts
1	(United States) Rex Mays	**2**	**1***	**1***	1225
2	(United States) Wilbur Shaw	1*			1000
3	(United States) Mauri Rose	3			675
4	(United States) Ted Horn	4		6	625
5	(United States) Joel Thorne	5		DNQ	450
6	(United States) Bob Swanson	6			375
7	(United States) Frank Wearne	7			325
8	(United States) Frank Brisko	9	8	DNQ	280
9	(United States) George Robson	23	4	11	275
10	(United States) Mel Hansen	8			275
11	(United States) Al Miller	30	2	9	210
12	(United States) George Connor	26	7	4	175
13	(United States) Floyd Davis	20	6	7	140
14	(United States) Harry McQuinn	11	13	12	140
15	(United States) Tommy Hinnershitz	32	11	3	135
16	(United States) Duke Nalon	22	3		135
17	(United States) Emil Andres	12	DNS	10	110
18	(France) René Le Bègue RY	10			91
19	(United States) Kelly Petillo	21	5	13	90
20	(United States) Shorty Cantlon	DNS		5	90
21	(France) René Dreyfus R	10			84
22	(United States) Paul Russo R	28	12	8	55
23	(United States) Overton Phillips	DNQ	9	DNQ	45
24	(United States) Hal Robson R			2	25
-	(United States) Lou Webb R	20	10	14	0
-	(United States) Sam Hanks R	13			0
-	(United States) Billy Devore	18	14	DNQ	0
-	(United States) George Barringer	14			0
-	(United States) Joie Chitwood R	15	DNQ		0
-	(United States) Louis Tomei	16			0
-	(United States) Henry Banks	17			0
-	(United States) Chet Miller	17			0
-	(United States) Al Putnam	19	DNQ	DNQ	0
-	(United States) Babe Stapp	24			0
-	(United States) Doc Williams	25			0
-	(United States) Cliff Bergere	27			0
-	(United States) Ralph Hepburn	29			0
-	(United States) Russ Snowberger	31			0
-	(Argentina) Raúl Riganti	33			0
-	(United States) Tony Willman	DNQ	DNQ	DNS	0
-	(United States) George Bailey	DNQ			0
-	(United States) Wesley Crawford	DNQ			0
-	(United States) Port DeFraties	DNQ			0
-	(United States) Louis Durant	DNQ			0
-	(United States) Ira Hall	DNQ			0
-	(United States) Bill Lipscomb	DNQ			0
-	(United States) Louis Unser	DNQ			0
-	(United States) Freddie Winnai	DNQ			0
Pos	Driver	INDY (United States)	SPR (United States)	SYR (United States)	Pts

Color	Result
Gold	Winner
Silver	2nd place
Bronze	3rd place
Green	4th & 5th place
Light Blue	6th-10th place
Dark Blue	Finished (Outside Top 10)
Purple	Did not finish (Ret)
Red	Did not qualify (DNQ)
Brown	Withdrawn (Wth)
Black	Disqualified (DSQ)
White	Did not start (DNS)
Blank	Did not participate (DNP)
Blank	Not competing

**In-line notation**
**Bold**	Pole position
Italics	Ran fastest race lap
*	Led most race laps
Rookie of the Year
Rookie

== See also ==
- 1940 Indianapolis 500
