= 1942 Indianapolis 500 =

American motor race

Indianapolis Motor Speedway

Indianapolis 500
- Sanctioning body: AAA
- Date: May 30, 1942 (cancelled)

Pre-race

Chronology
Previous	Next
1941	1946

The 1942 Indianapolis 500 was scheduled for Saturday May 30, 1942, at the Indianapolis Motor Speedway. It was to be the 30th annual running of the famous automobile race. The race was canceled due to the United States involvement in World War II. In total, the Indianapolis 500 was not held from 1942 to 1945.

This was the second instance in which the Indianapolis Motor Speedway suspended the annual running of the Indianapolis 500. During World War I the Speedway management voluntarily suspended competition in 1917–1918. However, for World War II, the decision to cancel the race was more resolute, and ultimately was part of a four-year nationwide ban on automobile racing.

During the war, the track was closed and neglected, and fell into a terrible state of disrepair. Towards the end of the war, revival of the "500" appeared unlikely, and the facility was in danger of being demolished in favor of development.

== Background ==
=== Offseason ===
Following the 1941 race, the 1941 National Championship was won by Rex Mays. With the hostilities of World War II escalating abroad, rumors began to circulate during the summer of 1941 that the 1942 race may be suspended. Track officials, however, rebuffed the rumors, and insisted the race would go on as planned. The AAA Contest Board announced their rules package for 1942, and with the United States still not involved in the war, preparations were underway to race. Rules and specifications were effectively frozen, as parts shortages due to the war were beginning to affect the sport.

A fire had swept through the "Gasoline Alley" garage area on the morning of the 1941 race, destroying the car of George Barringer, and burning down about a third of the southern bank of garages. About a month later, plans were drafted to rebuild the garages, and the work was done at some point during the summer and fall of 1941.

As was customary at the time, a number of non-points exhibition races took place at the Speedway in July, August, and September 1941. These races were usually put on to entertain visiting conventioneers. On September 9, 1941, an exhibition "match race" was held at the Speedway to entertain delegates attending the National Association of Postal Supervisors convention. Five drivers - Duke Nalon, Cliff Bergere, Russ Snowberger, Chet Miller, and George Connor - ran two short races. Nalon won the first, a 10-mile race, and Bergere won the second, a 15-mile race. It would be the last event held at the Speedway before the war intervened.

=== Cancellation ===
Ticket order forms were available for the race in November 1941. Less than a month later, the attack on Pearl Harbor launched the United States into World War II. Within days, public and political pressure began to mount on Speedway management to suspend the race.

Initially, the Speedway management was noncommittal about canceling the race, and tentatively proceeded with plans for the race. On December 29, 1941, Speedway president Eddie Rickenbacker announced that the 1942 Indianapolis 500 was canceled, and the race would remain suspended throughout the duration of the war. Unlike during World War I, all automobile racing under the auspices of the AAA Contest Board was suspended, and furthermore in July 1942, the federal government moved to ban automobile racing, primarily on account of rationing. Other reasons cited, however, included the need for the skilled mechanics and technicians from the racing fraternity to shift their labor to war efforts, or even enlistment. In addition, the intrinsic use of auto racing as a testing and proving ground for the automobile industry was largely unimportant, as the industry had already shifted its focus to wartime production and away from motoring public.

Rickenbacker initially offered the Speedway to the U. S. military for any purpose they saw fit. During World War I, it was activated as the 821st Aero Repair Squadron. But they could not use it during World War II, because warplanes of the day needed longer runways than the track's 5/8 mile straights provided. Thus the Speedway gates were locked, and the facility was abandoned. In March 1942, nearly the entire Speedway staff was laid off, and the headquarters offices at 444 North Capital Avenue in downtown Indianapolis was closed. The race would not be held from 1942 to 1945. The golf course on the premises, however, did operate for at least some time during the war. During the period in which the track was closed, it fell into a terrible state of disrepair. Grass and weeds overwhelmed the brick racing surface, and the old wooden grandstands became frail and unsuitable and inhospitable. The infield became an un-kept quagmire of weeds and overgrowth. Locals would occasionally wander the dormant infield, hunting small vermin, ride bicycles around the course, or simply explore the grounds.

Many former and future Indianapolis 500 drivers were servicemen in the war effort during World War II. Sam Hanks is believed to be the only driver who served in the war, and drove in the race both before and after. Some drivers from before the war period worked as consultants during the war to various suppliers. Most drivers who served did not return to racing afterwards, but a number of drivers who were not servicemen drove before and after. Several World War II veterans returned home to later become Indy drivers, including winners Lee Wallard, Bob Sweikert, and Rodger Ward.

=== Revival ===
Towards the end of the war, Firestone received permission from the U.S. government to conduct a tire test at the Speedway. On or approximately November 25, 1944, Firestone tested several passenger cars at the track. On November 29, 1944, Wilbur Shaw tested a race car, driving a full 500 miles, averaging about 100 mph. A second similar test was reported in the spring of 1945. Driver Sam Hanks took a tour of the facility with mechanic Harry C. "Cotton" Henning, and reported that the track was overgrown with weeds, the bleachers were about to collapse, and both conjectured that the race was finished.

On May 30, 1945, Bing Crosby and Bob Hope came to the Speedway to hold a war bonds rally, putting on a 45-minute show with Jerry Colonna and other entertainers. They then took part in a charity golf tournament at the Speedway Golf Course with Ed Dudley.

After World War II was over in the summer of 1945, Eddie Rickenbacker was mostly uninterested in reviving the Speedway, due to other commitments, including his involvement with Eastern Air Lines. He was looking to sell the property, perhaps to developers. Wilbur Shaw helped consummate a deal for Tony Hulman to purchase the track in November 1945, and it reopened in 1946. Hulman worked diligently over the next few months to revive and clean up the dilapidated facility, and make it suitable for world-class racing once again.

The 30th Indianapolis 500 was held May 30, 1946.

1941 Indianapolis 500; Mauri Rose; Floyd Davis	1942 Indianapolis 500; Cancelled	1946 Indianapolis 500; George Robson
