= Shaw (racing car) =

1937 Indy 500 winning car

The Shaw racing car, also known as the Gilmore-Shaw or Shaw-Gilmore Special, and later the Ervin Wolfe Special, was an American racing car designed and built by Wilbur Shaw, with which he won the 1937 Indianapolis 500.

== Car history ==
Shaw conceived the car in 1936 in order to retain the significant Indianapolis 500 prize money for himself rather than a car owner, which led to him nicknaming it the "pay car"; the Gilmore Oil Company provided seed capital of $1,500, in return for which Gilmore took the sponsorship rights. It was the first car at the Speedway to feature frontal streamlining and used an Offenhauser engine.

=== With Wilbur Shaw ===
The car's first appearance, in the 1936 Indianapolis 500, demonstrated its considerable speed and fuel economy, thanks to its streamlining; Shaw averaged 15 miles per gallon, the most efficient in the field. Shaw led from lap 32 to lap 82, but pitstops to secure the bodywork dropped Shaw out of the top ten, and he could only recover to seventh. Shaw also took the car to the 1936 Vanderbilt Cup, but the twisting circuit did not suit the car's aerodynamics, and Shaw crashed out on the third lap - he decided not to risk it in the 1937 event.

The 1937 500 was final iteration in which drivers had to use riding mechanics; Shaw was accompanied by Jigger Johnson, and won by just over two seconds, having to nurse the "pay car" to the finish with an oil leak.

Shaw's final run in the car was to 2nd in 1938, albeit three laps down on Floyd Roberts at the finish.

=== Before the Second World War ===
In 1939 Shaw - who had accepted an offer from Mike Boyle to drive a Maserati 8CTF - entered the "pay car" for Mauri Rose, who took it to 8th. Frank Wearne finished 7th in the "pay car" in the 1941 Indianapolis 500, having run in the top ten from the 300 mile mark.

=== As the Ervin Wolfe Special ===
After the Second World War, Ervin Wolfe bought the car, and entered it (as the Wolfe-Tulsa Special) for Frank Wearne in the 1946 Indianapolis 500 (finishing 8th), and George Barringer in the 1946 AAA Championship Car season. Near the end of the Labor Day race at Atlanta, Barringer was caught up in an accident when George Robson swerved into his path to avoid a mechanically-compromised Billy DeVore, and in the resulting pile-up Barringer and Robson were both killed.

=== Later history ===
The car was repaired and bought by racing promoter Ted Nyquist, who appointed Joie Chitwood to drive it in the 1948 Indianapolis 500, which much of its aerodynamic frontage having been reduced. The following year, businessman Lee Glessner bought it, and employed also-ran racer George Metzler to fettle and run it. On 28 May 1949, in practice for the 1949 Indianapolis 500, Metzler crashed heavily in the first turn, receiving injuries which proved fatal. There is no record of the car afterwards and it appears to have been scrapped.
