= List of Indianapolis 500 lap leaders =

== All-time lap leaders ==
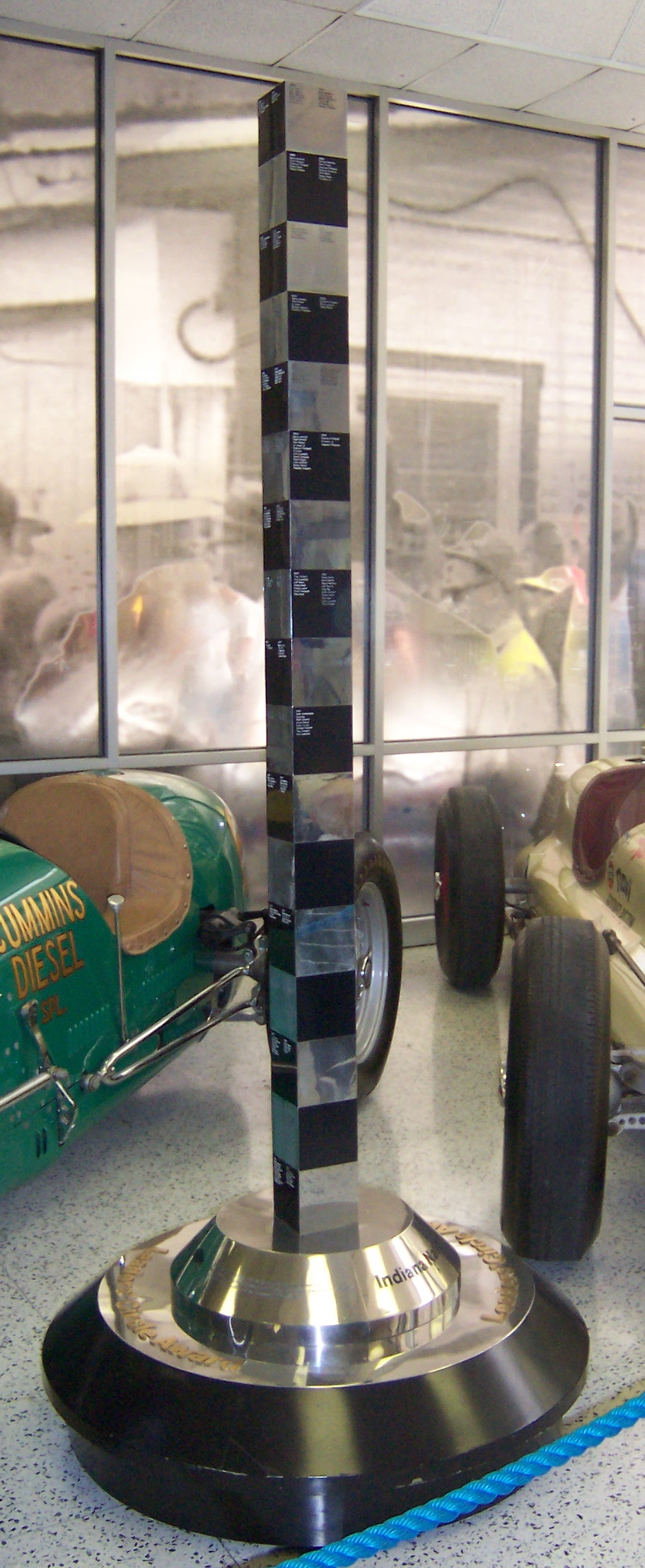
The Leaders Circle Award Trophy at the Indianapolis Motor Speedway Hall of Fame Museum

- Two hundred fifty-three drivers have led the Indianapolis 500-Mile Race, in 110 races.
- Career lap leader percentage rounded to hundredths of a percent.
- Green indicates drivers active as of most recent race.

Rank	Driver	Laps Led	Career Laps Run	Career Lap Leader Percentage	Race Wins	Years Won			
1	(New Zealand) Scott Dixon	709	Active driver		1	2008			
2	(United States) Al Unser	644	4,356	14.78%	4	1970	1971	1978	1987
3	(United States) Ralph DePalma	612	1,594	38.39%	1	1915			
4	(United States) Mario Andretti	556	3,040	18.29%	1	1969			
5	(United States) A. J. Foyt	555	4,909	11.31%	4	1961	1964	1967	1977
6	(United States) Wilbur Shaw	508	2,019	25.16%	3	1937	1939	1940	
7	(Brazil) Emerson Fittipaldi	505	1,785	28.29%	2	1989	1993		
8	(United States) Parnelli Jones	492	1,130	43.54%	1	1963			
9	(United States) Bill Vukovich	485	676	71.75%	2	1953	1954		
10	(United States) Bobby Unser	440	2,611	16.85%	3	1968	1975	1981	
11	(United States) Michael Andretti	431	2,653	16.25%					
12	(United States) Rick Mears	429	2,342	18.32%	4	1979	1984	1988	1991
13	(United States) Billy Arnold	410	821	49.94%	1	1930			
14	(Brazil) Tony Kanaan	352	3,951	8.91%	1	2013			
15	(United States) Gordon Johncock	339	3,158	10.73%	2	1973	1982		
16	(United States) Louis Meyer	332	1,916	17.33%	3	1928	1933	1936	
17	(United Kingdom) Dario Franchitti	329	1,940	16.96%	3	2007	2010	2012	
18	(Brazil) Hélio Castroneves	326	Active driver		4	2001	2002	2009	2021
19	(United Kingdom) Jim Clark	298	682	43.69%	1	1965			
20	(United States) Bill Holland	297	914	32.49%	1	1949			
21	(United States) Johnny Rutherford	296	2,792	10.60%	3	1974	1976	1980	
22	(United States) Rex Mays	266	1,385	19.21%					
23	(United States) Rodger Ward	261	2,160	12.08%	2	1959	1962		
24	(United States) Mauri Rose	256	2,326	11.01%	3	1941	1947	1948	
25	(United Kingdom) Dan Wheldon	235	1,729	13.59%	2	2005	2011		
26	(United States) Jimmy Murphy	220	907	24.26%	1	1922			
27	(United States) Ryan Hunter-Reay	219	Active driver		1	2014			
28	(United States) Tommy Milton	218	1,204	18.11%	2	1921	1923		
29	(United States) Jimmy Bryan	216	1,411	15.31%	1	1958			
30	(United States) Tom Sneva	208	2,180	9.54%	1	1983			
31	(United States) Frank Lockhart	205	280	73.21%	1	1926			
32	(Colombia) Juan Pablo Montoya	193	1,263	15.28%	2	2000	2015		
33	(Spain) Álex Palou	192	Active driver		1	2025			
34	(Netherlands) Arie Luyendyk	186	2,957	6.29%	2	1990	1997		
35	(United States) Jimmy Snyder	181	495	36.57%					
36	(United States) Lee Wallard	178	591	30.12%	1	1951			
37	(France) Simon Pagenaud	169	2,389	7.07%	1	2019			
38	(United States) Danny Sullivan	162	1,523	10.64%	1	1985			
39	(United States) Howdy Wilcox	155	1,335	11.61%	1	1919			
40	(South Africa) Tomas Scheckter	153	1,691	9.05%					
41	(United States) Jim Rathmann	150	2,320	6.47%	1	1960			
42	(United States) Ed Carpenter	150	Active driver						
43	(United States) Peter DePaolo	148	738	20.05%	1	1925			
44	(Australia) Will Power	145	Active driver		1	2018			
45	(United States) Marco Andretti	144	3,517	4.09%					
46	(United Kingdom) Dario Resta	140	408	34.31%	1	1916			
47	(United States) Sam Hanks	140	1,566	8.94%	1	1957			
48	(France) Jules Goux	139	773	17.98%	1	1913			
49	(United States) George Robson	138	333	41.44%	1	1946			
50	(United States) Pat Flaherty	138	812	17.00%	1	1956			
51	(United States) Gary Bettenhausen	138	2,372	5.82%					
52	(Japan) Takuma Sato	138	Active driver		2	2017	2020		
53	(United States) Johnnie Parsons	131	1,504	8.71%	1	1950			
54	(United States) Lloyd Ruby	126	2,357	5.35%					
55	(United States) Bobby Rahal	126	2,007	6.28%	1	1986			
56	(United States) Earl Cooper	123	939	13.10%					
57	(United States) Tony Stewart	122	700	17.43%					
58	(United States) Joe Boyer	119	555	21.44%	1	1924			
59	(United States) Greg Ray	116	920	12.61%					
60	(France) René Thomas	114	744	15.32%	1	1914			
61	(United States) Alexander Rossi	113	Active driver		1	2016			
62	(United States) Al Unser Jr.	110	3,173	3.47%	2	1992	1994		
63	(United States) Kelly Petillo	108	1,283	8.42%	1	1935			
64	(United States) Wally Dallenbach Sr.	108	1,448	7.46%					
65	(United States) Sam Hornish Jr.	107	1,346	7.95%	1	2006			
66	(United States) Babe Stapp	106	960	11.04%					
67	(United States) Fred Frame	106	1,281	8.27%	1	1932			
68	(Mexico) Pato O'Ward	104	Active driver						
69	(United States) Buddy Rice	99	1,047	9.46%	1	2004			
70	(United States) Ted Horn	94	1,944	4.84%					
71	(United States) Dave Lewis	93	383	24.28%					
72	(United States) Bill Cummings	93	1,229	7.57%	1	1934			
73	(United States) Floyd Roberts	92	883	10.42%	1	1938			
74	(Sweden) Kenny Bräck	89	885	10.06%	1	1999			
75	(United States) Eddie Cheever Jr.	89	2,122	4.19%	1	1998			
76	(United States) Ray Harroun	88	200	44.00%	1	1911			
77	(United States) Bob Sweikert	86	825	10.42%	1	1955			
78	(United States) Conor Daly	86	Active driver						
79	(Sweden) Felix Rosenqvist	86	Active driver		1	2026			
80	(United States) David Bruce-Brown	81	225	36.00%					
81	(United States) Danny Ongais	79	1,527	5.17%					
82	(Belgium) Arthur Duray	77	200	38.50%					
83	(Netherlands) Rinus VeeKay	73	Active driver						
84	(United States) Troy Ruttman	72	1,472	4.89%	1	1952			
85	(Brazil) Gil de Ferran	71	601	11.81%	1	2003			
86	(New Zealand) Scott McLaughlin	71	Active driver						
87	(United States) Jack McGrath	70	1,094	6.40%					
88	(United States) Mark Donohue	70	748	9.36%	1	1972			
89	(United States) Buddy Lazier	70	3,015	2.32%	1	1996			
90	(United States) Josef Newgarden	69	Active driver		2	2023	2024		
91	(United States) Frank Brisko	69	1,330	5.19%					
92	(United States) Leon Duray	68	693	9.81%					
93	(United States) Ralph Hepburn	68	1,864	3.65%					
94	(United States) George Souders	67	400	16.75%	1	1927			
95	(United States) Eddie Sachs	66	1,069	6.17%					
96	(Sweden) Marcus Ericsson	60	Active driver		1	2022			
97	(Brazil) Maurício Gugelmin	59	396	14.90%					
98	(United States) Harry Hartz	57	996	5.72%					
99	(Colombia) Roberto Guerrero	56	1,735	3.23%					
100	(United States) Johnny Thomson	55	1,044	5.27%					
101	(Canada) James Hinchcliffe	54	1,656	3.26%					
102	(United States) Robby Gordon	53	1,564	3.39%					
103	(United States) Joe Leonard	52	1,265	4.11%					
104	(United States) Jeff Ward	52	1,254	4.15%					
105	(Brazil) Bruno Junqueira	52	734	7.08%					
106	(United Kingdom) Max Chilton	50	997	5.02%					
107	(United States) Deacon Litz	49	1,560	3.14%					
108	(Canada) Scott Goodyear	49	1,460	3.35%					
109	(United States) Ray Keech	46	400	11.50%	1	1929			
110	(United States) Pat O'Connor	46	768	5.98%					
111	(United States) Davy Jones	46	784	5.86%					
112	(United States) Gil Anderson	44	784	5.61%					
113	(United States) Jimmy Gleason	43	617	6.97%					
114	(United States) Bob Burman	41	718	5.71%					
115	(United Kingdom) Jackie Stewart	40	358	11.17%					
116	(United States) Louis Schneider	39	863	4.51%	1	1931			
117	(United States) John Paul Jr.	39	883	4.42%					
118	(Canada) Alex Tagliani	39	1,543	2.52%					
119	(Italy) Teo Fabi	37	963	3.84%					
120	(United States) Bob Carey	36	200	18%					
121	(United States) Jim Hurtubise	36	894	4.03%					
122	(United States) Cliff Bergere	35	2,425	1.44%					
123	(United States) Paul Russo	35	1,482	2.36%					
124	(United States) Bob Swanson	34	267	12.73%					
125	(United Kingdom) Nigel Mansell	34	292	11.64%					
126	(Spain) Oriol Servià	34	1,992	1.70%					
127	(United States) Bobby Marshman	33	635	5.20%					
128	(United States) Tony Gulotta	33	1,989	1.66%					
129	(United States) Art Cross	32	768	4.17%					
130	(United States) Duke Nalon	32	1,284	2.49%					
131	(United States) David Malukas	32	Active driver						
132	(Australia) Ryan Briscoe	31	1,840	1.68%					
133	(United States) Phil Shafer	29	1,223	2.37%					
134	(United States) Mark Dismore	29	820	3.54%					
135	(United States) Danica Patrick	29	1,404	2.07%					
136	(Colombia) Carlos Muñoz	29	1,200	2.41%					
137	(United States) Graham Rahal	28	Active driver						
138	(Spain) Fernando Alonso	27	378	7.14%					
139	(United States) Jimmy Vasser	26	1,249	2.08%					
140	(United States) Jimmy Davies	25	631	3.96%					
141	(United States) Tony Bettenhausen	24	1,975	1.22%					
142	(United States) Lou Moore	23	1,304	1.76%					
143	(United States) A. J. Allmendinger	23	200	11.50%					
144	(United States) Sting Ray Robb	23	Active driver						
145	(Canada) Jacques Villeneuve	22	600	3.67%	1	1995			
146	(Brazil) Raul Boesel	21	2,213	0.95%					
147	(Italy) Alessandro Zampedri	20	199	10.05%					
148	(United States) George Amick	18	200	9.00%					
149	(United States) Johnny Boyd	18	1,427	1.26%					
150	(United States) Charlie Kimball	18	1,910	0.94%					
151	(United States) Kevin Cogan	17	1,556	1.09%					
152	(Canada) Devlin DeFrancesco	17	Active driver						
153	(United States) Johnny Aitken	16	194	8.25%					
154	(United States) Jerry Grant	16	1,275	1.25%					
155	(United States) Robbie Buhl	16	1,279	1.25%					
156	(United States) Santino Ferrucci	16	Active driver						
157	(Brazil) Vítor Meira	15	1,622	0.92%					
158	(United Kingdom) Mike Conway	15	476	3.15%					
159	(United States) Zach Veach	15	729	1.92%					
160	(United States) Colton Herta	15	Active driver						
161	(United States) Gaston Chevrolet	14	400	3.50%	1	1920			
162	(United States) Ernie Triplett	14	559	2.50%					
163	(United States) Russ Snowberger	13	1,633	0.80%					
164	(Mexico) Josele Garza	13	707	1.84%					
165	(United States) Billy Boat	13	1,112	1.17%					
166	(United Kingdom) Justin Wilson	13	1,488	0.87%					
167	(United States) Townsend Bell	13	1,898	0.68%					
168	(United States) J. R. Hildebrand	13	2,202	0.59%					
169	(United States) Swede Savage	12	62	19.35%					
170	(Brazil) Felipe Giaffone	12	955	1.26%					
171	(Belgium) Bertrand Baguette	11	383	2.87%					
172	(Denmark) Christian Rasmussen	11	Active driver						
173	(United States) Ralph Mulford	10	1,619	0.62%					
174	(United Kingdom) Graham Hill	10	333	3.00%	1	1966			
175	(United States) Alex Barron	10	942	1.06%					
176	(United States) Eddie Rickenbacker	9	355	2.53%					
177	(France) Albert Guyot	9	808	1.11%					
178	(Belgium) Josef Christiaens	9	320	2.81%					
179	(United States) Louis Chevrolet	9	452	1.99%					
180	(United States) Dutch Baumann	9	90	10.00%					
181	(United States) Len Sutton	9	708	1.27%					
182	(Brazil) Caio Collet	9	Active driver						
183	(United States) Jimmy Daywalt	8	999	0.80%					
184	(United States) Pancho Carter	8	2,141	0.37%					
185	(United Kingdom) Jim Crawford	8	1,043	0.77%					
186	(United States) Scott Pruett	8	592	1.35%					
187	(Israel) Robert Shwartzman	8	Active driver						
188	(United States) Don Freeland	7	1,311	0.53%					
189	(United States) Roger McCluskey	7	2,155	0.32%					
190	(Canada) Zachary Claman DeMelo	7	199	3.52%					
191	(United States) Spencer Pigot	7	981	0.71%					
192	(Cayman Islands) Kyffin Simpson	7	Active driver						
193	(United States) Ira Hall	6	485	1.24%					
194	(United Kingdom) Callum Ilott	6	Active driver						
195	(United States) Cecil Green	5	217	2.30%					
196	(United States) Jimmy Jackson	5	845	0.59%					
197	(United States) Spencer Wishart	5	604	0.83%					
198	(United States) Steve Krisiloff	5	1,387	0.36%					
199	(Venezuela) E. J. Viso	5	843	0.59%					
200	(United Kingdom) James Jakes	5	599	0.83%					
201	(Denmark) Christian Lundgaard	5	Active driver						
202	(United States) Fred Belcher	4	200	2.00%					
203	(United States) Cliff Durant	4	888	0.45%					
204	(United States) Mike Mosley	4	1,615	0.25%					
205	(United States) Buzz Calkins	4	1,056	0.38%					
206	(United States) Sam Schmidt	4	110	3.64%					
207	(France) Sébastien Bourdais	4	1,687	0.24%					
208	(United States) Oliver Askew	4	91	4.40%					
209	(United States) Sage Karam	4	1,368	0.29%					
210	(United States) Kyle Larson	4	Active driver						
211	(United States) Kyle Kirkwood	4	Active driver						
212	(United States) George Snider	3	1,832	0.16%					
213	(United States) Davey Hamilton	3	1,783	0.17%					
214	(United States) Scott Sharp	3	2,180	0.14%					
215	(United States) Bryan Herta	3	965	0.31%					
216	(Mexico) Adrian Fernández	3	583	0.51%					
217	(Brazil) Mario Moraes	3	211	1.42%					
218	(United States) Bryan Clauson	3	305	0.98%					
219	(United Kingdom) Stefan Wilson	3	549	0.55%					
220	(United Kingdom) Jack Harvey	3	Active driver						
221	(New Zealand) Marcus Armstrong	3	Active driver						
222	(France) Romain Grosjean	3	Active driver						
223	(United States) Caleb Bragg	2	269	0.74%					
224	(United States) Teddy Tetzlaff	2	371	0.54%					
225	(United States) Joe Dawson	2	445	0.45%	1	1912			
226	(United States) Robert Evans	2	158	1.27%					
227	(United States) Paul Bost	2	66	3.03%					
228	(United States) Herb Ardinger	2	884	0.23%					
229	(United States) Dan Gurney	2	1,204	0.17%					
230	(United States) Roger Rager	2	55	3.64%					
231	(United States) Don Whittington	2	547	0.37%					
232	(United States) John Andretti	2	1,852	0.11%					
233	(United States) Robby McGehee	2	887	0.23%					
234	(Japan) Tora Takagi	2	379	0.53%					
235	(United States) Jaques Lazier	2	979	0.20%					
236	(Brazil) Rubens Barrichello	2	200	1.00%					
237	(Australia) James Davison	2	748	0.27%					
238	(Canada) Robert Wickens	2	200	1.00%					
239	(United States) Jimmie Johnson	2	193	1.04%					
240	(France) Jean Chassagne	1	285	0.35%					
241	(United States) Art Klein	1	413	0.24%					
242	(United States) Roscoe Sarles	1	354	0.28%					
243	(United States) Howdy Wilcox II	1	200	0.50%					
244	(United States) Fred Agabashian	1	1,273	0.08%					
245	(Australia) Jack Brabham	1	510	0.20%					
246	(United States) Bobby Allison	1	113	0.88%					
247	(United States) Bill Vukovich II	1	1,527	0.07%					
248	(United States) Tim Richmond	1	388	0.26%					
249	(United States) Gordon Smiley	1	188	0.53%					
250	(United States) Scott Brayton	1	1,905	0.05%					
251	(France) Stéphan Grégoire	1	760	0.13%					
252	(United States) Jeff Simmons	1	609	0.16%					
253	(Russia) Mikhail Aleshin	1	524	0.19%					
Note	(United States) Lora L. Corum*	0			1	1924			
Note	(United States) Floyd Davis*	0			1	1941			

- (United States) Lora L. Corum and (United States) Floyd Davis are credited as being co-winners of the Indianapolis 500 in 1924 and 1941, respectively. However, as the winning entries in either race led only after their secondary drivers drove (and to the conclusion), Corum and Davis are not credited with leading any of those laps, nor did they lead throughout the remainder of their careers.

== Lap Leaders, Individual Races ==
=== Most Laps Led ===
Fifty-seven of one hundred ten Indianapolis 500-Mile Races have been won by the driver leading the most laps, 53.27%.

Year	Leader, Most Laps	Laps Led	Percentage Race Led	Won Race
1911	(United States) Ray Harroun	88	44.0%	Yes
1912	(United States) Ralph DePalma	196	98.0%	No
1913	(France) Jules Goux	138	69.0%	Yes
1914	(France) René Thomas	102	51.0%	Yes
1915	(United States) Ralph DePalma	132	66.0%	Yes
1916	(United Kingdom) Dario Resta	103	85.8%	Yes
1919	(United States) Howdy Wilcox	98	49.0%	Yes
1920	(United States) Joe Boyer	93	46.5%	No
1921	(United States) Ralph DePalma	108	54.0%	No
1922	(United States) Jimmy Murphy	153	76.5%	Yes
1923	(United States) Tommy Milton	128	64.0%	Yes
1924	(United States) Earl Cooper	119	59.5%	No
1925	(United States) Peter DePaolo	115	57.5%	Yes
1926	(United States) Frank Lockhart	95	59.4%	Yes
1927	(United States) Frank Lockhart	110	55.0%	No
1928	(United States) Leon Duray	64	32.0%	No
1929	(United States) Louis Meyer	65	32.5%	No
1930	(United States) Billy Arnold	198	99.0%	Yes
1931	(United States) Billy Arnold	155	77.5%	No
1932	(United States) Fred Frame	58	29.0%	Yes
1933	(United States) Louis Meyer	71	35.5%	Yes
1934	(United States) Frank Brisko	69	29.5%	No
1935	(United States) Kelly Petillo	102	51.0%	Yes
1936	(United States) Louis Meyer	96	48.0%	Yes
1937	(United States) Wilbur Shaw	131	65.5%	Yes
1938	(United States) Floyd Roberts	92	46.0%	Yes
1938	(United States) Jimmy Snyder	92	46.0%	No
1939	(United States) Louis Meyer	79	39.5%	No
1940	(United States) Wilbur Shaw	136	68.0%	Yes
1941	(United States) Wilbur Shaw	107	53.5%	No
1946	(United States) George Robson	138	69.0%	Yes
1947	(United States) Bill Holland	143	71.5%	No
1948	(United States) Mauri Rose	81	40.5%	Yes
1949	(United States) Bill Holland	146	73.0%	Yes
1950	(United States) Johnnie Parsons	115	83.3%	Yes
1951	(United States) Lee Wallard	159	79.5%	Yes
1952	(United States) Bill Vukovich	150	75.0%	No
1953	(United States) Bill Vukovich	195	97.5%	Yes
1954	(United States) Bill Vukovich	90	45.0%	Yes
1955	(United States) Bob Sweikert	86	43.0%	Yes
1956	(United States) Pat Flaherty	127	63.5%	Yes
1957	(United States) Sam Hanks	136	68.0%	Yes
1958	(United States) Jimmy Bryan	139	69.5%	Yes
1959	(United States) Rodger Ward	130	65.0%	Yes
1960	(United States) Jim Rathmann	100	50.0%	Yes
1961	(United States) A.J. Foyt	71	35.5%	Yes
1962	(United States) Parnelli Jones	120	60.0%	No
1963	(United States) Parnelli Jones	167	83.5%	Yes
1964	(United States) A.J. Foyt	146	73.0%	Yes
1965	(United Kingdom) Jim Clark	190	95.0%	Yes
1966	(United States) Lloyd Ruby	68	34.0%	No
1967	(United States) Parnelli Jones	171	85.5%	No
1968	(United States) Bobby Unser	127	63.5%	Yes
1969	(United States) Mario Andretti	116	58.0%	Yes
1970	(United States) Al Unser	190	95.0%	Yes
1971	(United States) Al Unser	103	51.5%	Yes
1972	(United States) Gary Bettenhausen	138	69.0%	No
1973	(United States) Gordon Johncock	64	48.1%	Yes
1974	(United States) Johnny Rutherford	122	61.0%	Yes
1975	(United States) Wally Dallenbach	96	55.2%	No
1976	(United States) Johnny Rutherford	48	47.1%	Yes
1977	(United States) Gordon Johncock	129	64.5%	No
1978	(United States) Al Unser	121	60.5%	Yes
1979	(United States) Bobby Unser	89	44.5%	No
1980	(United States) Johnny Rutherford	118	59.0%	Yes
1981	(United States) Bobby Unser	89	44.5%	Yes
1982	(United States) Rick Mears	77	38.5%	No
1983	(United States) Tom Sneva	98	49.0%	Yes
1984	(United States) Rick Mears	119	59.5%	Yes
1985	(United States) Mario Andretti	107	53.5%	No
1986	(United States) Rick Mears	76	38.0%	No
1987	(United States) Mario Andretti	170	85.0%	No
1988	(United States) Danny Sullivan	91	45.5%	No
1989	(Brazil) Emerson Fittipaldi	158	79.0%	Yes
1990	(Brazil) Emerson Fittipaldi	128	64.0%	No
1991	(United States) Michael Andretti	97	48.5%	No
1992	(United States) Michael Andretti	160	80.0%	No
1993	(United States) Mario Andretti	72	36.0%	No
1994	(Brazil) Emerson Fittipaldi	145	72.5%	No
1995	(Brazil) Maurício Gugelmin	59	29.5%	No
1996	(Colombia) Roberto Guerrero	47	23.5%	No
1997	(United States) Tony Stewart	64	32.0%	No
1998	(United States) Eddie Cheever	76	38.0%	Yes
1999	(Sweden) Kenny Bräck	66	33.0%	Yes
2000	(Colombia) Juan Pablo Montoya	167	83.5%	Yes
2001	(Brazil) Hélio Castroneves	52	26.0%	Yes
2002	(South Africa) Tomas Scheckter	85	42.5%	No
2003	(South Africa) Tomas Scheckter	63	31.5%	No
2004	(United States) Buddy Rice	91	50.5%	Yes
2005	(United States) Sam Hornish Jr.	77	38.5%	No
2006	(United Kingdom) Dan Wheldon	148	74.0%	No
2007	(Brazil) Tony Kanaan	83	50.0%	No
2008	(New Zealand) Scott Dixon	115	57.5%	Yes
2009	(New Zealand) Scott Dixon	73	36.5%	No
2010	(United Kingdom) Dario Franchitti	155	77.5%	Yes
2011	(New Zealand) Scott Dixon	73	36.5%	No
2012	(United States) Marco Andretti	59	29.5%	No
2013	(United States) Ed Carpenter	37	18.5%	No
2014	(United States) Ryan Hunter-Reay	56	28.0%	Yes
2015	(New Zealand) Scott Dixon	84	42.0%	No
2016	(United States) Ryan Hunter-Reay	52	26.0%	No
2017	(United Kingdom) Max Chilton	50	25.0%	No
2018	(United States) Ed Carpenter	65	32.5%	No
2019	(France) Simon Pagenaud	116	58.0%	Yes
2020	(New Zealand) Scott Dixon	111	55.5%	No
2021	(United States) Conor Daly	40	20.0%	No
2022	(New Zealand) Scott Dixon	95	47.5%	No
2023	(Mexico) Pato O'Ward	39	19.5%	No
2024	(New Zealand) Scott McLaughlin	66	33.0%	No
2025	(Japan) Takuma Sato	51	25.5%	No
2026	(Spain) Álex Palou	59	29.5%	No

=== More than 50% of race laps led, non-winning entries ===
Twenty separate entries in equal years, driven by sixteen drivers, have failed to win despite leading over half a given race's completed laps.

Rank	Year	Driver	Laps Led	Race Percentage	Final Pos
1	1912	(United States) Ralph DePalma	196	98.0%	11
2	1967	(United States) Parnelli Jones	171	85.5%	6
3	1987	(United States) Mario Andretti	170	85.0%	9
4	1992	(United States) Michael Andretti	160	80.0%	13
5	1931	(United States) Billy Arnold	155	77.5%	19
6	1952	(United States) Bill Vukovich	150	75.0%	17
7	2006	(United Kingdom) Dan Wheldon	148	74.0%	4
8	1994	(Brazil) Emerson Fittipaldi	145	72.5%	17
9	1947	(United States) Bill Holland	143	71.5%	2
10	1972	(United States) Gary Bettenhausen	138	69.0%	14
11	1977	(United States) Gordon Johncock	129	64.5%	11
12	1990	(Brazil) Emerson Fittipaldi	128	64.0%	3
13	1962	(United States) Parnelli Jones	120	60.0%	7
14	1924	(United States) Earl Cooper	119	59.5%	2
15	2020	(New Zealand) Scott Dixon	111	55.5%	2
16	1927	(United States) Frank Lockhart	110	55.0%	10
17	1921	(United States) Ralph DePalma	108	54.0%	12
18	1941	(United States) Wilbur Shaw	107	53.5%	18
18	1985	(United States) Mario Andretti	107	53.5%	2
20	1975	(United States) Wally Dallenbach	96	55.2%	9

== Lap leader records ==
Most races led Drivers leading in at least ten races Background colors designate finishing position
Races; Led	Driver	Years																
17	(New Zealand) Scott Dixon	2003	2006	2007	2008	2009	2011	2012	2013	2014	2015	2017	2019	2020	2021	2022	2024	2026
15	(Brazil) Tony Kanaan	2002	2003	2004	2005	2006	2007	2008	2012	2013	2014	2015	2016	2017	2018	2022		
14	(Brazil) Hélio Castroneves	2001	2002	2003	2006	2007	2009	2010	2013	2014	2015	2016	2017	2021	2023			
13	(United States) A. J. Foyt	1961	1962	1964	1965	1967	1969	1970	1974	1975	1976	1977	1979	1982				
11	(United States) Al Unser	1970	1971	1973	1977	1978	1979	1983	1987	1988	1992	1993						
11	(United States) Mario Andretti	1966	1969	1980	1981	1984	1985	1987	1989	1991	1992	1993						
10	(United States) Bobby Unser	1968	1971	1972	1973	1974	1975	1977	1979	1980	1981							
10	(Australia) Will Power	2010	2013	2014	2015	2016	2017	2018	2019	2020	2023							

Most consecutive races led Twelve drivers have led in five or more consecutive* races.
Years		Driver
8	2013—2020	(Australia) Will Power
7	2002—2008	(Brazil) Tony Kanaan
7	2012—2018	(Brazil) Tony Kanaan
6	1979—1984	(United States) Rick Mears
6	2011—2016	(Canada) Alex Tagliani
6	2021—2026	(Spain) Álex Palou
6	2021—2026	(Mexico) Pato O'Ward
5	1938—1946	(United States) Rex Mays
5	1940—1948	(United States) Mauri Rose
5	1971—1975	(United States) Bobby Unser
5	1980—1984	(United States) Tom Sneva
5	2011—2015	(New Zealand) Scott Dixon
5	2013—2017	(Brazil) Helio Castroneves
* (United States) Rex Mays and (United States) Mauri Rose led the race in periods extending nine years each, but are counted as leading in five consecutive due to the cancellation of the race, from 1942—1945, due to World War II

Most race laps led by winning entry Eleven entries, all to date starting from the front row* have won in dominant fashion, leading three-quarters or more of a given race's completed laps.
Laps; Led	Percent; Race Led	Year	Winning Driver	Start; Pos
198	99.0%	1930	(United States) Billy Arnold	1
195	97.5%	1953	(United States) Bill Vukovich	1
190	95.0%	1965	(United Kingdom) Jim Clark	2
190	95.0%	1970	(United States) Al Unser	1
103	85.8%	1916	(United Kingdom) Dario Resta	4*
167	83.5%	1963	(United States) Parnelli Jones	1
167	83.5%	2000	(Colombia) Juan Pablo Montoya	2
159	79.5%	1951	(United States) Lee Wallard	2
158	79.0%	1989	(Brazil) Emerson Fittipaldi	3
155	77.5%	2010	(United Kingdom) Dario Franchitti	3
153	76.5%	1922	(United States) Jimmy Murphy	1
* With four-wide starts occurring in years 1913-1920, Dario Resta started on the front row in 1916.

Fewest race laps led by winning entry Eighteen entries have won despite leading only ten percent (20 laps / 50 miles) or less of a given race.
Laps; Led	Percent; Race Led	Year	Driver	Start; Pos
1	0.5%	2011	(United Kingdom) Dan Wheldon	6
2	1.0%	1912	(United States) Joe Dawson	7
5	2.5%	2023	(United States) Josef Newgarden	17
9	4.5%	2015	(Colombia) Juan-Pablo Montoya	15
10	5.0%	1966	(United Kingdom) Graham Hill	15
11	6.3%	1975	(United States) Bobby Unser	3
13	6.5%	1972	(United States) Mark Donohue	3
13	6.5%	2022	(Sweden) Marcus Ericsson	5
14	7.0%	1920	(United States) Gaston Chevrolet	6
14	7.0%	2016	(United States) Alexander Rossi	11
14	7.0%	2025	(Spain) Álex Palou	6
15	7.5%	1995	(Canada) Jacques Villeneuve	5
16	8.0%	1993	(Brazil) Emerson Fittipaldi	9
17	8.5%	2017	(Japan) Takuma Sato	4
18	9.0%	1987	(United States) Al Unser	20
19	9.5%	1928	(United States) Louis Meyer	13
19	9.5%	2006	(United States) Sam Hornish Jr.	1
20	10.0%	2021	(Brazil) Hélio Castroneves	8

Most race laps led by non-winning entry Six entries have failed to win despite dominating to lead three-quarters or more of a given race's completed laps.
Laps; Led	Percent; Race Led	Year	Driver	Start; Pos	Final; Pos
196	98.0%	1912	(United States) Ralph DePalma	7	11
171	85.5%	1967	(United States) Parnelli Jones	6	6
170	85.0%	1987	(United States) Mario Andretti	1	9
160	80.0%	1992	(United States) Michael Andretti	6	13
155	77.5%	1931	(United States) Billy Arnold	18	19
150	75.0%	1952	(United States) Bill Vukovich	8	17

Most laps led from start Eleven entries have led the opening quarter (50 laps / 125 miles) or further distance of a given race.
Laps	Year	Driver	Full; Laps; Led	Percent; Race Led	Start; Pos	Final; Pos
92	1990	(Brazil) Emerson Fittipaldi	128	64.0%	1	3
81	1927	(United States) Frank Lockhart	110	55.0%	1	18
74	1922	(United States) Jimmy Murphy	153	76.5%	1	1
65	1919	(United States) Ralph DePalma	93	46.5%	4*	6
63	1935	(United States) Rex Mays	89	44.5%	1	17
59	1962	(United States) Parnelli Jones	120	60.0%	1	7
54	1925	(United States) Peter DePaolo	115	57.5%	2	1
54	1928	(United States) Leon Duray	59	29.5%	1	19
51	1967	(United States) Parnelli Jones	171	85.5%	6	6
50	1971	(United States) Mark Donohue	52	26.0%	2	25
50	1997	(United States) Tony Stewart	64	32.0%	2	5
* With four-wide starts occurring in years 1913-1920, Ralph DePalma started on the front row in 1919.

Led opening lap and final lap: 21 entries among 19 drivers

- Jimmy Murphy, 1922
- Joe Boyer, 1924 (only occasion of occurrence in separate entries)
- Peter DePaolo, 1925
- Lee Wallard, 1951
- Bill Vukovich, 1953
- Jimmy Bryan, 1958
- Jim Clark, 1965
- Mario Andretti, 1969
- Al Unser, 1970
- Johnny Rutherford, 1976
- Johnny Rutherford, 1980
- Bobby Unser, 1981
- Rick Mears, 1984
- Emerson Fittipaldi, 1989
- Rick Mears, 1991
- Al Unser Jr., 1994
- Buddy Rice, 2004
- Scott Dixon, 2008
- Hélio Castroneves, 2009
- Dario Franchitti, 2010
- Simon Pagenaud, 2019

Led opening lap, consecutive races Nine drivers have led the opening race lap in consecutive races.
Years		Driver
2	1922—1923	(United States) Jimmy Murphy
2	1928—1929	(United States) Leon Duray
2	1935—1936	(United States) Rex Mays
2	1940—1941	(United States) Rex Mays
2	1954—1955	(United States) Jack McGrath
2	1964—1965	(United Kingdom) Jim Clark
2	1972—1973	(United States) Bobby Unser
2	1989—1990	(Brazil) Emerson Fittipaldi
2	1996—1997	(United States) Tony Stewart
2	2022—2023	(Spain) Álex Palou

Most laps led by rookie Nine drivers have led one quarter (50 laps / 125 miles) or further race distance in their first year of competition.
Laps	Percent; Race Led	Year	Driver	Start; Pos	Final; Pos
167	83.5%	2000	(Colombia) Juan Pablo Montoya	2	1
143	71.5%	1947	(United States) Bill Holland	8	2
138	69.0%	1913	(France) Jules Goux	7	1
102	51.0%	1914	(France) René Thomas	15	1
95	59.4%	1926	(United States) Frank Lockhart	20	1
85	42.5%	2002	(South Africa) Tomas Scheckter	10	26
77	38.5%	1914	(Belgium) Arthur Duray	10	2
52	26.0%	2001	(Brazil) Hélio Castroneves	11	1
51	25.5%	1927	(United States) George Souders	22	1

Latest lead change Races with final lead change taking place at or within five laps of finish
Lap	Year	Winner	Passed
200	2006	(United States) Sam Hornish Jr.	(United States) Marco Andretti
200	2011	(United Kingdom) Dan Wheldon	(United States) J. R. Hildebrand
200	2023	(United States) Josef Newgarden	(Sweden) Marcus Ericsson
200	2024	(United States) Josef Newgarden	(Mexico) Pato O'Ward
200	2026	(Sweden) Felix Rosenqvist	(United States) David Malukas
199	1912	(United States) Joe Dawson	(United States) Ralph DePalma
199	1989	(Brazil) Emerson Fittipaldi	(United States) Al Unser Jr.
199	1999	(Sweden) Kenny Bräck	(United States) Robby Gordon
199	2012	(United Kingdom) Dario Franchitti	(New Zealand) Scott Dixon
199	2019	(France) Simon Pagenaud	(United States) Alexander Rossi
199	2021	(Brazil) Hélio Castroneves	(Spain) Álex Palou
198	1961	(United States) A. J. Foyt	(United States) Eddie Sachs
198	1986	(United States) Bobby Rahal	(United States) Kevin Cogan
198	2013	(Brazil) Tony Kanaan	(United States) Ryan Hunter-Reay
197	1960	(United States) Jim Rathmann	(United States) Rodger Ward
197	1967	(United States) A.J. Foyt	(United States) Parnelli Jones
197	2014	(United States) Ryan Hunter-Reay	(Brazil) Hélio Castroneves
197	2015	(Colombia) Juan Pablo Montoya	(Australia) Will Power
197	2016	(United States) Alexander Rossi	(Colombia) Carlos Muñoz
196	1995	(Canada) Jacques Villeneuve (Note: Goodyear was assessed a penalty for passing the safety car on a Lap 191 restart, and did not serve penalty within the five laps allotted. By rule, his lap card as pulled and Villeneuve took the lead automatically after the fifth lap.)	(Canada) Scott Goodyear
196	2018	(Australia) Will Power	(United Kingdom) Stefan Wilson

Most Leaders in Race; Races with ten or more race leaders
Leaders	Year	Winner
16	2024	(United States) Josef Newgarden
15	2017	(Japan) Takuma Sato
15	2018	(Australia) Will Power
14	2013	(Brazil) Tony Kanaan
14	2023	(United States) Josef Newgarden
14	2025	(Spain) Álex Palou
14	2026	(Sweden) Felix Rosenqvist
13	2016	(United States) Alexander Rossi
13	2021	(Brazil) Hélio Castroneves
12	1993	(Brazil) Emerson Fittipaldi
11	2014	(United States) Ryan Hunter-Reay
11	2020	(Japan) Takuma Sato
10	1980	(United States) Johnny Rutherford
10	1995	(Canada) Jacques Villeneuve
10	1998	(United States) Eddie Cheever
10	2011	(United Kingdom) Dan Wheldon
10	2012	(United Kingdom) Dario Franchitti
10	2015	(Colombia) Juan Pablo Montoya
10	2019	(France) Simon Pagenaud

Fewest Leaders in Race; Races with three or fewer race leaders
Leaders	Year	Winner
2	1930	(United States) Billy Arnold
2	1965	(United Kingdom) Jim Clark
3	1912	(United States) Joe Dawson
3	1916	(United Kingdom) Dario Resta
3	1919	(United States) Howdy Wilcox
3	1938	(United States) Floyd Roberts
3	1940	(United States) Wilbur Shaw
3	1947	(United States) Mauri Rose
3	1950	(United States) Johnnie Parsons
3	1952	(United States) Troy Ruttman
3	1967	(United States) A. J. Foyt
3	1968	(United States) Bobby Unser
3	1990	(Netherlands) Arie Luyendyk
3	1994	(United States) Al Unser Jr.

Most Lead Changes in Race; Races with twenty-five or more lead changes
Lead; Changes	Year	Winner
70	2026	(Sweden) Felix Rosenqvist
68	2013	(Brazil) Tony Kanaan
54	2016	(United States) Alexander Rossi
52	2023	(United States) Josef Newgarden
48	2024	(United States) Josef Newgarden
38	2022	(Sweden) Marcus Ericsson
37	2015	(Colombia) Juan Pablo Montoya
35	2017	(Japan) Takuma Sato
35	2021	(Brazil) Hélio Castroneves
34	2012	(United Kingdom) Dario Franchitti
34	2014	(United States) Ryan Hunter-Reay
30	2018	(Australia) Will Power
29	1960	(United States) Jim Rathmann
29	2019	(France) Simon Pagenaud
28	1923	(United States) Tommy Milton
27	2005	(United Kingdom) Dan Wheldon

Fewest Lead Changes in Race; Races with three or fewer lead changes
Lead; Changes	Year	Winner
1	1930	(United States) Billy Arnold
2	1912	(United States) Joe Dawson
2	1916	(United Kingdom) Dario Resta
3	1919	(United States) Howdy Wilcox
3	1931	(United States) Louis Schneider
3	1949	(United States) Bill Holland

== Leaders Circle Club ==
In 1964, Autolite created the "Pacemakers Club," which recognized drivers who had led at least one lap during the Indianapolis 500. It quickly rose in stature and popularity, and became a highly sought-after honor associated with the Indianapolis 500. After changes in sponsorship, the organization was renamed the "Leaders Circle Club".

The qualifications were simple: any driver who had led at least one lap during the history of the race, whether living or already deceased, were recognized as members. At its inception, 102 drivers were listed as members. A total of 56 were deceased at the time, and 46 were living.

Honorees receive a jacket, and are honored at a banquet in their honor. The number of new members inducted at the banquet varies annually, as it is solely based on the previous year's first-time lap leaders. Some years can have as few as one or zero new members inducted, while other years have had as many as 4–5. The "club" is still active as of 2012.

== See also ==
- IMS Official Statistics: List of Lap Leaders
- Compilations of Indianapolis Star and Indianapolis News breakdowns of individual 500-mile (800 km) races
- Indianapolis 500 Chronicle, Rick Popely, June 1998
