= 1905 in motorsport =

The following is an overview of the events of 1905 in motorsport, including the major racing events, racing festivals, circuits that were opened and closed during a year, championships and non-championship events that were established and disestablished in a year, and births and deaths of racing drivers and other motorsport people.

== Births ==
Date	Month	Name	Nationality	Occupation	Note	Ref
9	March	Floyd Davis	American	Racing driver	Indianapolis 500 winner (1941).	
5	November	Louis Rosier	French	Racing driver	Winner of the 24 Hours of Le Mans (1950)	
16	December	Billy Arnold	American	Racing driver	Indianapolis 500 winner (1930).	
22	December	Pierre Levegh	French	Racing driver		

== See also ==
- List of 1905 motorsport champions
