= List of National Sprint Car Hall of Fame inductees =

This is a list of inductees in the National Sprint Car Hall of Fame.

== 1990 ==
- Christopher J.C. Agajanian
- Arthur Chevrolet
- Louis Chevrolet
- Larry Dickson
- August Duesenberg
- Fred Duesenberg
- A. J. Foyt
- Tommy Hinnershitz
- Frank Lockhart
- Rex Mays
- Harry Arminius Miller
- Barney Oldfield
- Jan Opperman
- Gus Schrader
- Wilbur Shaw
- Floyd "Pop" Dreyer
- Jack Gunn
- Ralph Hankinson
- J. Alex Sloan
- Floyd Trevis

== 1991 ==
- Ralph DePalma
- Louis Meyer
- Duke Nalon
- Ted Horn
- Parnelli Jones
- Don Edmunds
- Duane "Pancho" Carter
- Ernie Triplett
- Emory Collins
- Hector Honore
- Jerry Richert Sr.
- Art Sparks
- Bud Winfield
- Ed Winfield
- Frank Funk
- Fred Wagner
- Al Sweeney
- Marion Robinson

== 1992 ==
- Bobby Grim
- Tommy Milton
- Sheldon Kinser
- Jud Larson
- Eddie Rickenbacker
- Bob Sall
- Rich Vogler
- Tony Willman
- Art Pillsbury
- John Vance
- Alex Morales
- Earl Gilmore
- Ennis "Dizz" Wilson
- Dick Gaines
- T. E. "Pop" Myers
- Sam Nunis
- John Gerber
- Ronnie Allyn

== 1993 ==
- Gary Bettenhausen
- Duane Carter Sr.
- Joie Chitwood
- Chris Economaki
- Ira Hall
- Jim Hurtubise
- Roger McCluskey
- Troy Ruttman
- Myron Stevens
- Ira Vail
- A. J. Watson
- Lloyd Axel
- Walt James
- Bob Trostle
- Frank Winkley

== 1994 ==
- Don Branson
- Jimmy Bryan
- Sig Haugdahl
- Frank Kurtis
- George "Doc" MacKenzie
- Fred Offenhauser
- Elbert "Babe" Stapp
- Jimmy Wilburn
- Ralph Capitani
- Earl Baltes
- Deb Snyder
- Leo Goossen
- Karl Kinser
- O. D. Lavely
- Marshall "Shorty" Pritzbur

== 1995 ==
- Bob Sweikert
- Pete DePaolo
- Pat O'Connor
- Johnny Rutherford
- Bill Ambler
- John Ambler
- Pete Folse
- Bill Hill
- Rick Ferkel
- Gaylord White
- Frank Luptow
- Richard "Mitch" Smith
- Wally Meskowski
- Don Smith
- LaVern Nance
- Louis Vermeil

== 1996 ==
- Emil Andres
- Mario Andretti
- Tom Bigelow
- Mike Nazaruk
- Johnny Thomson
- Jerry Blundy
- Lynn Paxton
- Roy Richwine
- Bill Pickens
- Russ Clendenen
- Rollie Beale
- Willie Davis
- Ted Halibrand
- John Sloan
- J. W. Hunt
- Paul Weirick

== 1997 ==
- Joe James
- Stubby Stubblefield
- Bobby Unser
- Travis "Spider" Webb
- Bruce Bromme Sr.
- Tom Cherry
- Charlie Curryer
- Vern Fritch
- Hiram Hillegass
- Leo Krasek
- Dick Tobias
- Dick Wallen
- Kenny Weld
- Harry Wimmer
- Gordon Woolley

== 1998 ==
- Sam Hanks
- Harry Hartz
- Norman "Bubby" Jones
- Bill Schindler
- Greg Weld
- Bobby Allen
- Gary Patterson
- Dean Thompson
- Grant King
- Bob Weikert
- Tom Holden
- Ted Johnson
- Gene Van Winkle

== 1999 ==
- Eddie Sachs
- Johnny White
- Al Gordon
- Ray Lee Goodwin
- Lealand McSpadden
- Bob Kinser
- Clarence "Hooker" Hood
- LeRoy Van Conett
- Russ Garnant
- Steve Stapp
- Granvel Henry
- Don Basile
- John Sawyer
- Fred Loring
- Larry Sullivan

== 2000 ==
- Joe Saldana
- Al "Cotton" Farmer
- Chester "Chet" Gardner
- Earl Halaquist
- Allen Heath
- Bert Emick
- Beryl Ward
- Harold Leep
- Jimmy Oskie
- Steve Smith
- Tom Marchese
- Bob Russo
- Paul Fromm
- August "Gus" Hoffman
- D. William "Speedy Bill" Smith
- Chester "Chet" Wilson
- L. A. "Les" Ward

== 2001 ==
- Emmett "Buzz" Barton
- Brad Doty
- Bob Hogle
- Eddie Leavitt
- Albert "Buddy" Taylor
- Davey Brown Sr.
- Bob Estes
- Gary Stanton
- Don Martin
- Jack Miller
- Dick Sutcliffe
- Don Mack

== 2002 ==
- Jack Hewitt
- Jim McElreath
- Everett Saylor
- Dick Berggren - announcer, editor of Stock Car Racing magazine
- Larry "Smokey" Snellbaker
- J. Gordon Betz
- Sam Traylor
- Joe Scalzo
- Lloyd Beckman
- Ralph "Speedy" Helm
- Maynard "Hungry" Clark
- John Bagley
- Galen Fox

== 2003 ==
- Sammy Sessions
- Billy Winn
- Clarence "Mutt" Anderson
- Armin Krueger
- John "Jack" Shillington Prince
- Jay Woodside
- Robert Roof
- Bud Carson
- Al Hamilton
- Fred Horey
- Ron Shuman Elected on first ballot eligible on age
- Bill Utz
- Doug Wolfgang Elected on first ballot eligible on age

== 2004 ==
- Bryan Saulpaugh
- Chuck Amati
- Sherman "Red" Campbell
- Chuck Gurney
- Keith Kauffman
- Bob Slater
- Billy Wilkerson
- Jim Culbert
- Ralph Morgan
- "Boston" Louie Seymour
- Walter E. Bull
- Bruce Craig
- R. Keith Hall
- Don Peabody

== 2005 ==
- Steve Butler
- Bob Carey
- Elmer George
- Bill Holland
- Steve Kinser Elected on first ballot eligible on age
- Robbie Stanley
- Don Brown
- Ray Tilley
- Dick Simonek
- John Mahoney
- Jim Raper
- Norm Witte
- Kenny Woodruff

== 2006 ==
- Lee Kunzman
- Sammy Swindell
- Lanny Edwards
- Johnny Hannon
- Rickey Hood
- Bob Pankratz
- Jud Phillips
- Francis Quinn
- Newton "Buzz" Rose
- Jimmy Sills
- Granville "Buster" Warke
- Taylor "Pappy" Weld
- Ted Wilson

== 2007 ==
- Joe Jagersberger
- Bayliss Levrett
- Shane Carson
- Jerry "Scratch" Daniels
- Rajo Jack
- Kenny Jacobs
- Hal Minyard
- Earl Gaerte
- Glen Niebel
- Ken Coles
- Emmett Hahn
- Bill White

== 2008 ==
- Tony Bettenhausen
- Louis "Rusty" Espinoza
- Glenn Fitzcharles
- Bob Hampshire
- Doug Howells
- Dick Jordan
- Brent Kaeding
- John Padjen
- Johnnie Parsons
- Gordon Schroeder
- Earl Wagner
- Kramer Williamson

== 2009 ==
- Allan Brown
- Jim Chini
- Jack Elam
- Lee Elkins
- Jac Haudenschild
- Jackie Holmes
- Tommy Nicholson
- Lee Osborne
- Cavino Petillo
- Roger Rager
- Fred Rahmer
- Louis Senter
- Rodney "Rip" Williams

== 2010 ==
- Clyde Adams
- Bobbie Adamson
- Hank Arnold
- George Bentel
- Fred Brownfield
- Ben Krasner
- Fred Linder
- Casey Luna
- Frank Riddle
- Hal Robson
- Herman Schurch
- Don Shepherd

== 2011 ==
- W.W. Bowen
- Jimmy Boyd
- Bruce Bromme Jr.
- Bob Burman
- Wally Campbell
- Andy Granatelli
- Leonard Kerbs
- Danny Lasoski
- Gene Marderness
- Della Rice
- Emmett Shelley
- Joe Sostilio
- Gary Wright

== 2012 ==
- Johnny Anderson
- Thad Dosher
- Sam Hoffman
- Harry Hosterman
- Chuck Hulse
- C. Henry Meyer
- A. Earl Padgett
- Colby Scroggin
- Ron Shaver
- Gary Sokola
- Bill Vandewater
- Bobby Ward

== 2013 ==
- Charles "Dutch" Baumann
- Art Bisch
- Lou Blaney
- Jeff Bloom
- Richard Hoffman
- Harols "Red" Lempelius
- Andy Linden
- Jean Lynch
- Ernest Moross
- Brad Noffsinger
- Edd Sheppard
- C.W. Van Ranst

== 2014 ==
- Dave Argabright
- Larry Beckett
- Dave Blaney
- Bobby Davis
- Mark Kinser
- William "Windy" McDonald
- Chuck Merrill
- George Nesler

== 2015 ==
- Mike Arthur
- Roger Beck
- "Tiger" Gene Brown
- Brice Ellis
- Don Kreitz
- Danny Smith
- Gil Sonner
- Charlie Wiggins

== 2016 ==
- Dale Blaney
- Doug Clark (Official at Knoxville Raceway)
- Gene Crucean
- Roy "Bud" Grimm Jr.
- Shirley Kear Valentine
- Frankie Kerr
- Mark Light
- Gus Linder

== 2017 ==
- Doug Auld
- Earl Cooper
- Dave Darland
- Tony Elliott
- Guy Forbrook
- Terry McCarl
- John Singer
- Pat Sullivan

== 2018 ==
- Steve Beitler
- Bryan Clauson (elected on first ballot eligible after death)
- Lance Dewease
- Oscar "Red" Garnant
- Scott Gerkin
- Emmett J. Malloy
- Bob Mays
- Dave Steele (elected on first ballot eligible after death)

== 2019 ==
- Jason Johnson (elected on first ballot eligible after death)
- Stevie Smith
- Richard Griffin
- M. A. Brown
- C. K. Spurlock
- Thomas J. Schmeh
- Greg Stephens
- Bill Endicott

== 2020/21 ==
- Bill Cummings
- Walt Dyer
- Greg Hodnett
- Don Lamberti
- Paul Leffler
- L. Spencer Riggs
- Tim Shaffer
- Jeff Swindell

== 2022 ==
- Bob Frey
- John Gibson
- Eric Gordon
- Terry Gray
- Tim Green
- Ralph Heintzelman Sr.
- Jack Kromer
- Robin Miller
- Walter T. Ross
- Dennis Roth
- Walter "Slim" Rutherford
- Tony Stewart

Reference for 2022 inductees:

== 2023 ==
- Johnny Capels
- Max Dolder
- Ken Hamilton
- Paul Hazen
- Chad Kemenah
- Alan Kreitzer
- Cory Kruseman
- Bobby Marshall
- Joie Ray
- Joey Saldana
- Tommy Sanders
- Ralph Sheheen
- Johnny Vance

Reference for 2023 inductees:

== 2024 ==
- Mark "Bones" Bourcier
- Tracy Hines
- Bill Holder
- Paul McMahan
- Roy Robbins
- Jon Stanbrough
- Gary "Deuce" Turrill
- Ricky Warner

== 2025 ==
- Davey Brown Jr.
- Craig Dollansky
- Damion Gardner
- Kenny Gritz
- Don Ott
- Carlton Reimers
- Todd Shaffer
- Steve Sinclair
