= 1941 AAA Championship Car season =

Auto racing season

- AAA National Championship Trail

Season
- Races: 3
- Start date: May 30
- End date: September 1

Awards
- National champion: (United States) Rex Mays
- Indianapolis 500 winner: (United States) Floyd Davis (United States) Mauri Rose

The 1941 AAA Championship Car season consisted of three races, beginning in Speedway, Indiana on May 30 and concluding in Syracuse, New York on September 1. There was also one non-championship event held at Langhorne, Pennsylvania. The AAA National Champion was Rex Mays and the Indianapolis 500 co-winners were Floyd Davis and Mauri Rose - the second such occasion in history. The National Championship was not held again until 1946, due to World War II.

== Schedule and results ==
All races running on Paved/Dirt Oval.

Rnd	Date	Race name	Track	Location	Type	Pole position	Winning driver
1	May 30	(United States) International 500 Mile Sweepstakes	Indianapolis Motor Speedway	Speedway, Indiana	Paved	(United States) Mauri Rose	(United States) Floyd Davis
1	May 30	(United States) International 500 Mile Sweepstakes	Indianapolis Motor Speedway	Speedway, Indiana	Paved	(United States) Mauri Rose	(United States) Mauri Rose^{A}
NC	June 22	(United States) Langhorne 100	Langhorne Speedway	Langhorne, Pennsylvania	Dirt	—	(United States) Duke Nalon
2	August 24	(United States) Milwaukee 100	Wisconsin State Fair Park Speedway	West Allis, Wisconsin	Dirt	(United States) Rex Mays	(United States) Rex Mays
3	September 1	(United States) Syracuse 100	New York State Fairgrounds	Syracuse, New York	Dirt	(United States) Rex Mays	(United States) Rex Mays

Non-championship race

^A Shared drive

== Final points standings ==
- Note 1: Drivers had to complete 50% of the race distance to score points. Points scored by drivers sharing a ride were split according to percentage of race driven. Starters were not allowed to score points as relief drivers, if a race starter finished the race in another car, in a points scoring position, those points were awarded to the driver who had started the car.
- Note 2: Mauri Rose started the No. 3 car during the Indianapolis 500, but dropped out early with mechanical issues. On lap 72, he relieved Floyd Davis in the No. 16 car, and went on to finish first. While both Davis and Rose were recognized as co-winners - the second of two such occasions in Indianapolis 500 history - the winner's points went to Davis, who started and qualified the No. 16 car.
- The final standings based on reference.

Pos	Driver	INDY (United States)	MIL (United States)	SYR (United States)	Pts
1	(United States) Rex Mays	2	**1***	**1***	1225
2	(United States) Ted Horn	3			675
3	(United States) Ralph Hepburn	4			550
4	(United States) Floyd Davis	1		5	450
5	(United States) Cliff Bergere	5			450
6	(United States) Chet Miller	6	8	DNQ	430
7	(United States) George Connor	16	2	3	300
8	(United States) Frank Wearne	8			275
9	(United States) Mauri Rose	**26**	3	4	245
10	(United States) Tony Bettenhausen RY		6	2	240
11	(United States) Paul Russo	9			181
12	(United States) Al Putnam	12	4	11	167.4
13	(United States) Harry McQuinn	7			157.6
14	(United States) Louis Tomei	11			125
15	(United States) George Robson	25	7	9	110
16	(United States) Frank McGurk		9	7	110
17	(United States) Tommy Hinnershitz	10			105
18	(United States) Emil Andres	30	5	13	90
19	(United States) Tony Willman	20	12	6	75
20	(United States) Louis Durant	9			61.6
21	(United States) Walt Brown R			8	55
22	(United States) Duke Nalon	15	11	10	35
-	(United States) Overton Phillips	13	10	14	0
-	(United States) Lee Wallard R			12	0
-	(United States) Joie Chitwood	14			0
-	(United States) Everett Saylor	17			0
-	(United States) Wilbur Shaw	18*			0
-	(United States) Billy Devore	19		DNS	0
-	(United States) Russ Snowberger	21			0
-	(United States) Deacon Litz	22			0
-	(United States) Frank Brisko	23			0
-	(United States) Doc Williams	24			0
-	(United States) Kelly Petillo	27		DNQ	0
-	(United States) Al Miller	28			0
-	(United States) Mel Hansen	29			0
-	(United States) Joel Thorne	31			0
-	(United States) George Barringer	DNS	DNQ		0
-	(United States) Shorty Cantlon	DNQ	DNQ		0
-	(United States) Ira Hall	DNQ			0
-	(United States) Sam Hanks	DNQ			0
-	(France) René Le Bègue	DNQ			0
-	(United States) Bill Lipscomb	DNQ			0
-	(United States) Roy Russing	DNQ			0
-	(France) Jean Trévoux	DNQ			0
-	(United States) Eddie Casterline			DNQ	0
-	(United States) Bill Holland			DNQ	0
Pos	Driver	INDY (United States)	MIL (United States)	SYR (United States)	Pts

Color	Result
Gold	Winner
Silver	2nd place
Bronze	3rd place
Green	4th & 5th place
Light Blue	6th-10th place
Dark Blue	Finished (Outside Top 10)
Purple	Did not finish (Ret)
Red	Did not qualify (DNQ)
Brown	Withdrawn (Wth)
Black	Disqualified (DSQ)
White	Did not start (DNS)
Blank	Did not participate (DNP)
Blank	Not competing

**In-line notation**
**Bold**	Pole position
Italics	Ran fastest race lap
*	Led most race laps
RY Rookie of the Year
R Rookie

== See also ==
- 1941 Indianapolis 500
