= Everett Saylor =

American racing driver (1909–1942)

- Born: Everett Ellsworth Saylor; October 8, 1909 Brookville, Ohio, U.S.
- Died: May 31, 1942 (aged 32) Cape Girardeau, Missouri, U.S.

Champ Car career
- 1 race run over 1 year
- First race: 1941 Indianapolis 500 (Indianapolis)
Wins	Podiums	Poles
0	0	0

Everett Ellsworth Saylor (October 8, 1909 – May 31, 1942) was an American racing driver.

== Racing career ==
A dirt track racing specialist, Saylor competed in the 1941 Indianapolis 500. It was his only Championship Car race start. He was killed in a racing accident on the dirt track at Cape Girardeau.

== Awards and honors ==
Saylor was inducted into the National Sprint Car Hall of Fame in 2002.

== Motorsports career results ==
=== Indianapolis 500 results ===
Year	Car	Start	Qual	Rank	Finish	Laps	Led	Retired
1941	47	12	119.860	31	17	155	0	Crash T4
Totals						155	0	

Starts	1
Poles	0
Front Row	0
Wins	0
Top 5	0
Top 10	0
Retired	1
