= Overton Phillips =

American racing driver (1908–1999)

- Born: Overton Axton Phillips; September 20, 1908 Ottumwa, Iowa, U.S.
- Died: April 1, 1999 (aged 90) Santa Barbara, California, U.S.

Champ Car career
- 5 races run over 4 years
- Best finish: 23rd (1940)
- First race: 1936 Vanderbilt Cup (Westbury)
- Last race: 1941 Syracuse 100 (Syracuse)
Wins	Podiums	Poles
0	0	0

Overton Axton Phillips (September 20, 1908 – April 1, 1999) was an American racing driver.

== Racing career ==
During trials for the 1937 Indianapolis 500, Overton's car burst into flames when a crank shaft broke and punctured his gas tank. He crashed into the pits, killing George Warford. Phillips was sometimes known by the nickname "Bunny".

== Motorsports career results ==
=== Indianapolis 500 results ===
Year	Car	Start	Qual	Rank	Finish	Laps	Led	Retired
1941	26	26	116.298	33	13	187	0	Flagged
Totals						187	0	

Starts	1
Poles	0
Front Row	0
Wins	0
Top 5	0
Top 10	0
Retired	0
