= Ralph Hepburn =

American racing driver (1896–1948)

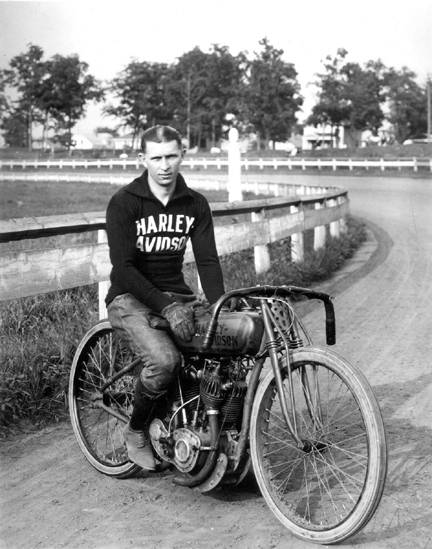
- Hepburn, circa 1919
- Born: Ralph Rodolphus Hepburn; April 11, 1896 Somerville, Massachusetts, U.S.
- Died: May 16, 1948 (aged 52) Speedway, Indiana, U.S.

Champ Car career
- 44 races run over 18 years
- Best finish: 3rd (1931, 1941)
- First race: 1924 Beverly Hills 250 (Beverly Hills)
- Last race: 1946 Indianapolis 500 (Indianapolis)
Wins	Podiums	Poles
0	6	1

Ralph Rodolphus Hepburn (April 11, 1896 – May 16, 1948) was a pioneer American motorcycle racing champion and an Indianapolis 500 racing driver.

== Biography ==
Born in Somerville, Massachusetts, Hepburn's family moved to Los Angeles, California when he was ten years old. He began riding motorcycles as a teen and his skills led to him signing on with a cycle performing group in 1914 that toured the West Coast and parts of the American Midwest. He then began competing in on board tracks, then on dirt. His racing career was interrupted during 1917 and 1918 due to World War I.

In June 1919, Hepburn came to national prominence when he won the 200 mi (320 km) National Championship at Ascot Park in Los Angeles riding for the Harley-Davidson factory. He began winning consistently thereafter and in 1921 won the "Dodge City 300 National Championship" while breaking all existing 300 mi (480 km) records. In 1922 he dominated professional track racing for the Indian Motocycle company. That year, he rode to his second victory in the 300 mi (480 km) National Championship motorcycle race, this time at Meridian Speedway in Wichita, Kansas.

At the end of the 1924 American racing season, and after competing in special events in Australia, Hepburn began his auto racing career.

In 1925, Hepburn competed in a car built by Harry Miller in the first of fifteen appearances at the Indianapolis 500. Later that year, during practice for the AMA 100-mile (160 km) championship race at Altoona Speedway, he crashed his Harley-Davidson racing motorcycle and damaged his hand. Hepburn then lent the motorcycle to Indian rider Joe Petrali, who won the race and shared the prize money with him. This began Petrali's association with Harley-Davidson.

In 1929, Hepburn qualified third at Indianapolis, but gear problems resulted in him having to drop out after only fourteen laps. He finished third in 1931, and although he led the famous race three times in three different decades and had four finishes in the top five, his best result came in 1937 with a second-place finish 2.16 seconds behind Wilbur Shaw, the closest ever at that time.

For a time, Hepburn served as president of the American Society of Professional Automobile Racers. In 1946, at the age of 50, Hepburn qualified Novi Governor Special at of 134.449 mph (216.375 km/h). He led forty-four laps in the race before the car stalled on Lap 121.

In 1947, Hepburn joined Preston Tucker and Tucker Corporation and drove the prototype Tucker 48 onstage when it was unveiled to the public on June 19, 1947. He served as West Coast Regional Manager for Tucker Corporation.

Hepburn died practicing for the 1948 Indianapolis 500 while driving a Novi Special for Tucker Corporation. He was survived by his wife Ida Mae Hepburn and one daughter Joanne Hepburn. He is buried at Forest Lawn Memorial Park Cemetery in Glendale, California.

In 1970, Hepburn was inducted into the Indianapolis Motor Speedway Hall of Fame, and in 1998, he was inducted into the AMA Motorcycle Hall of Fame.

== Motorsports career results ==
=== Indianapolis 500 results ===
Year	Car	Start	Qual	Rank	Finish	Laps	Led	Retired
1925	17	6	108.489	7	16	144	15	Gas tank
1926	19	15	102.517	14	8	151	0	Flagged
1927	19	5	114.209	5	24	39	0	Fuel tank leak
1928	16	6	116.354	6	24	48	0	Timing gears
1929	18	3	116.543	3	31	14	0	Transmission
1931	19	10	107.933	18	3	200	0	Running
1933	23	41	110.001	32	38	33	0	Rod bearing
1934	31	11	114.321	10	14	164	0	Connecting rod
1935	21	7	115.156	13	5	200	0	Running
1936	9	24	112.673	28	12	196	0	Flagged
1937	8	6	118.809	15	2	200	9	Running
1939	25	13	122.204	22	22	107	0	Crash BS
1940	54	21	123.860	9	29	47	0	Steering
1941	54	10	120.653	28	4	200	0	Running
1946	2	19	133.944	1	14	121	44	Stalled
Totals						1864	68	

Starts	15
Poles	0
Front Row	1
Wins	0
Top 5	4
Top 10	5
Retired	9
