= 1941 Indianapolis 500 =

American motor race

29th Indianapolis 500
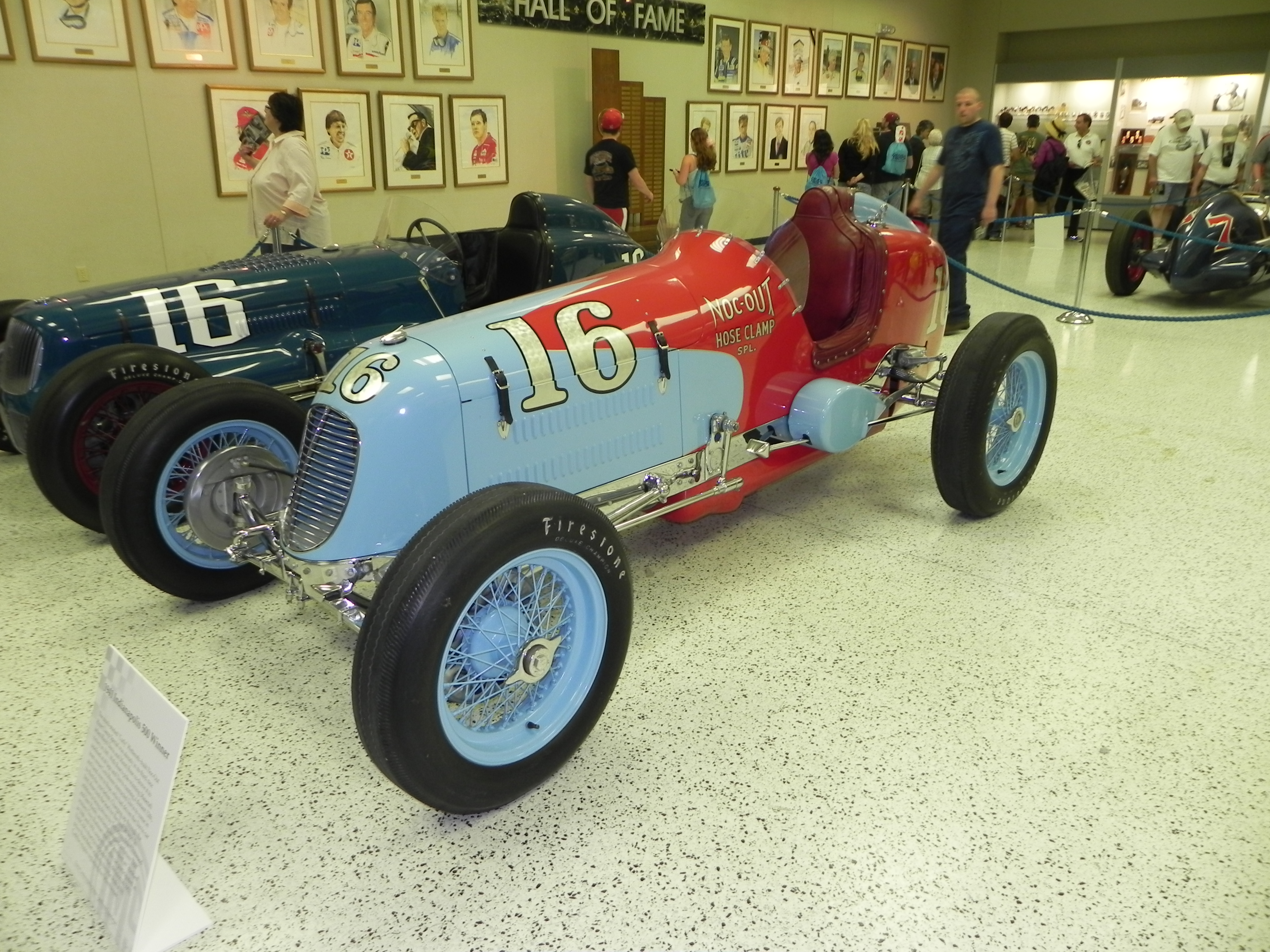

Indianapolis Motor Speedway

Indianapolis 500
- Sanctioning body: AAA
- Date: May 30, 1941
- Winner: Floyd Davis and Mauri Rose (co-winners)
- Winning Entrant: Lou Moore
- Winning Chief Mechanic: Ed Shampay
- Winning time: 4:20:36.24
- Average speed: 115.117 mph
- Pole position: Mauri Rose
- Pole speed: 128.691 mph
- Most laps led: Wilbur Shaw (107)

Pre-race
- Pace car: Chrysler Newport Phaeton
- Pace car driver: A. B. Couture
- Starter: Seth Klein
- Honorary referee: Guy Vaughan
- Estimated attendance: 160,000

Chronology
Previous	Next
1940	1942-45 (cancelled-WWII)

The 29th International 500-Mile Sweepstakes Race was held at the Indianapolis Motor Speedway on Friday, May 30, 1941. The start of the race was delayed due to a fire that swept through the garage area on race morning. No persons were injured, but one car in the field was destroyed. The race rolled off with only 31 cars, and ran to its scheduled distance. This would be the final "500" prior to the United States involvement in World War II along with the final race under with Eddie Rickenbacker as president of the speedway. He kept the track locked during the war before selling the track in November 1945 to Tony Hulman. The race returned a year later.

The 1941 race was the second, and most recent "500" to be recorded with co-winners. Floyd Davis started the race in the #16 Noc-Out Hose Clamp Special. His teammate Mauri Rose started the race on the pole position in the #3 car, but his dropped out early with spark plug trouble. Rose took over behind the wheel of the #16 car on lap 73, and drove that car to victory. Davis and Rose were credited as co-winners, and it was the first of three "500" victories for Rose.

== Race details ==
Sam Hanks was injured in a practice crash the day before the race and withdrew. Rather than elevate the first alternate to the starting field, Hanks was credited with 33rd place.

=== Garage area fire ===
On the morning of the race a fire broke out in the "Gasoline Alley" garage area. George Barringer's revolutionary rear-engined car was destroyed. At the time, the car was being refueled (with gasoline). In a nearby garage, another car which was owned by Joel Thorne was being worked on with a welder. The fumes caught fire from the sparks of the welding, and a huge fire broke out which burned down about a third of the southern bank of garages. The start of the race was delayed by a couple hours, and fire fighters had trouble getting to the Speedway to put out the blaze due to the heavy race day traffic. Barringer's car was withdrawn, and he was credited with 32nd finishing position. With both Sam Hanks and Barringer out, the race lined up with only 31 cars.

Various equipment, tools, parts, and other supplies were lost in the fire. Two cars that did not qualify for the race were reported to have been damaged. However, all of the other cars that qualified for the race were safely evacuated. No major injuries were reported. The fire was put out, but the site smoldered throughout the day, and smoke continued to rise even after the race had safely started.

About a month later, the entire garage complex was demolished. At some point during summer and fall of 1941, a new Gasoline Alley garage area was built in its place. However, due to the war, the new garages would sit unused until 1946.

=== Wilbur Shaw ===
Two-time defending champion (and three-time winner overall) Wilbur Shaw crashed while leading on lap 152, and failed in his bid to become the first driver to three-peat at the Indianapolis 500 (and first four-time winner). As of 2025, no driver has ever won the Indianapolis 500 three consecutive years. Going down the mainstretch, the car lost control, and hit the outside wall, rupturing the gas tank. Shaw was drenched with fuel, and suffered a back injury which left him immobile for several minutes. Despite the fuel spill, the fuel did not ignite, and Shaw was brought to safety by the medical staff.

It is believed that the morning garage fire had an effect on Shaw's efforts. At some point before the race, Shaw's crew was preparing his tires for race day, and used chalk to write notes on the spare tires. One particular wheel was determined to be out of balance, and rather than being discarded, it was labeled in chalk with the words "USE LAST". However, the firefighters' water hoses are believed to have washed off the chalk message. Shaw inadvertently took on the bad wheel during a pit stop, which caused his crash.

Shaw never drove another competitive lap at the Speedway. He did participate in a special private tire test at the Speedway during World War II and became president of the track in 1946.

=== Floyd Davis & Mauri Rose ===
Floyd Davis was the starting driver for the #16 car. On lap 72, Davis came in for a pit stop, and was relieved by Mauri Rose. Rose had started the race in another car and dropped out earlier. Car owner Lou Moore was apparently unsatisfied with Davis' performance thus far in the race, and ordered Rose to take over. Rose charged up the standings and took the lead in the #16 car, and went on to win. Both drivers were credited as "co-winners," similar to what occurred in the 1924 race. This marked the last time that one car would carry two drivers to victory at Indy.

== Starting grid ==
Row	Inside		Middle		Outside	
1	3	(United States) Mauri Rose	1	(United States) Rex Mays	2	(United States) Wilbur Shaw W
2	15	(United States) Harry McQuinn	36	(United States) Doc Williams	7	(United States) Frank Wearne
3	34	(United States) Cliff Bergere	23	(United States) Billy Devore	41	(United States) Chet Miller
4	54	(United States) Ralph Hepburn	42	(United States) Russ Snowberger	47	(United States) Everett Saylor R
5	14	(United States) George Connor	12	(United States) Al Miller	19	(United States) Emil Andres
6	10	(United States) George Robson	16	(United States) Floyd Davis	45	(United States) Paul Russo
7	22	(United States) Kelly Petillo W	27	(United States) Tommy Hinnershitz	9	(United States) Mel Hansen
8	8	(United States) Frank Brisko	5	(United States) Joel Thorne	53	(United States) Louis Tomei
9	62	(United States) Tony Willman	26	(United States) Overton Phillips R	25	(United States) Joie Chitwood
10	4	(United States) Ted Horn	32	(United States) Deacon Litz	17	(United States) Duke Nalon
11	55	(United States) Al Putnam				

R Indianapolis 500 rookie
W Indianapolis 500 winner

=== Did not start ===
- George Barringer (#35), car destroyed in garage fire
- Sam Hanks (#28), Injured in practice accident

=== Alternates ===
- First alternate: Louis Durant R

=== Failed to Qualify ===
- Shorty Cantlon
- Ira Hall (#38)
- René Le Bègue (#21)
- Bill Lipscomb R (#57)
- Roy Russing R (#22)
- Jean Trévoux R (#24)

== Box score ==
Finish	Start	No	Name	Chassis	Engine	Qual	Rank	Laps	Status
1	17	16	(United States) Floyd Davis (Laps 1–72) (United States) Mauri Rose (Laps 73–200)	Wetteroth	Offenhauser	121.106	25	200	115.117 mph
2	2	1	(United States) Rex Mays	Stevens	Winfield	128.301	2	200	+1:29.95
3	28	4	(United States) Ted Horn	Adams	Sparks	124.297	8	200	+2:52.15
4	10	54	(United States) Ralph Hepburn	Miller	Novi	120.653	28	200	+3:24.55
5	7	34	(United States) Cliff Bergere	Wetteroth	Offenhauser	123.890	13	200	+3:38.86
6	9	41	(United States) Chet Miller	Miller	Miller	121.540	23	200	+7:26.51
7	4	15	(United States) Harry McQuinn (Kelly Petillo Laps 98-200)	A-R Weil	Alfa Romeo	125.449	4	200	+7:44.72
8	6	7	(United States) Frank Wearne	Shaw	Offenhauser	123.890	12	200	+10:06.68
9	18	45	(United States) Paul Russo (Louis Durant Laps 100–138)	Marchese	Miller	125.217	5	200	+26:24.75
10	20	27	(United States) Tommy Hinnershitz (George Robson Laps 121–200)	Adams	Offenhauser	121.021	27	200	+24:41.81
11	24	53	(United States) Louis Tomei	Miller	Offenhauser	121.070	26	200	+25:18.71
12	31	55	(United States) Al Putnam (Louis Durant Laps 154–200)	Wetteroth	Offenhauser	121.951	20	200	+35:18.57
13	26	26	(United States) Overton Phillips R (Mel Hansen Laps 104–187)	Bugatti	Miller	116.298	33	187	Flagged
14	27	25	(United States) Joie Chitwood	Lencki	Lencki	120.329	29	177	Flagged
15	30	17	(United States) Duke Nalon	Maserati	Maserati	122.951	17	173	Flagged
16	13	14	(United States) George Connor	Stevens	Offenhauser	123.984	10	167	Transmission
17	12	47	(United States) Everett Saylor R	Weil	Offenhauser	119.860	31	155	Crash T4
18	3	2	(United States) Wilbur Shaw W	Maserati	Maserati	127.836	3	151	Crash T1
19	8	23	(United States) Billy Devore	Stevens	Offenhauser	121.770	21	121	Rod
20	25	62	(United States) Tony Willman	Stevens	Offenhauser	123.920	11	117	Rod
21	11	42	(United States) Russ Snowberger	Snowberger	Offenhauser	120.104	30	107	Water pump
22	29	32	(United States) Deacon Litz	Stevens	Sampson	123.440	15	89	Oil trouble
23	22	8	(United States) Frank Brisko	Stevens	Brisko	123.381	16	70	Valve
24	5	36	(United States) Doc Williams	Cooper	Offenhauser	124.014	9	68	Radiator
25	16	10	(United States) George Robson	Weil	Duray	121.576	22	66	Oil leak
26	1	3	(United States) Mauri Rose	Maserati	Maserati	128.691	1	60	Spark plugs
27	19	22	(United States) Kelly Petillo W	Wetteroth	Offenhauser	124.417	7	48	Rod
28	14	12	(United States) Al Miller	Miller	Miller	123.478	14	22	Transmission
29	21	9	(United States) Mel Hansen	Miller	Offenhauser	124.599	6	11	Rod
30	15	19	(United States) Emil Andres	Lencki	Lencki	122.266	19	5	Crash T1
31	23	5	(United States) Joel Thorne	Adams	Sparks	121.163	24	5	Crash T1
DNS	—	35	(United States) George Barringer	Miller	Miller	122.299	18	0	Garage fire
DNS	—	28	(United States) Sam Hanks	Kurtis Kraft	Offenhauser	118.211	32	0	Practice crash

Note: Relief drivers in parentheses

W Former Indianapolis 500 winner

R Indianapolis 500 Rookie

All entrants utilized Firestone tires.

=== Race statistics ===
Lap Leaders
Laps	Leader
1–38	Rex Mays
39–44	Mauri Rose
45–151	Wilbur Shaw
152–161	Cliff Bergere
162–200	Mauri Rose

Total laps led
Driver	Laps
Wilbur Shaw	107
Mauri Rose	45
Rex Mays	38
Cliff Bergere	10

Yellow Lights
Laps*	Reason
5–35	Joel Thorne, Emil Andres crash in turn 1
151	Wilbur Shaw crash in turn 1
155	Everett Saylor crash in turn 4
* – Approximate lap counts

=== Other Notes ===
Speedway president Eddie Rickenbacker did not attend the race, and instead listened to it on the radio. He was recovering from injuries suffered in a near-fatal plane crash a few months before the race.

== See also ==
- 1941 AAA Championship Car season

1940 Indianapolis 500; Wilbur Shaw	1941 Indianapolis 500; Mauri Rose; Floyd Davis	1946 Indianapolis 500; George Robson
