= Mel Hansen =

American racing driver (1911–1963)

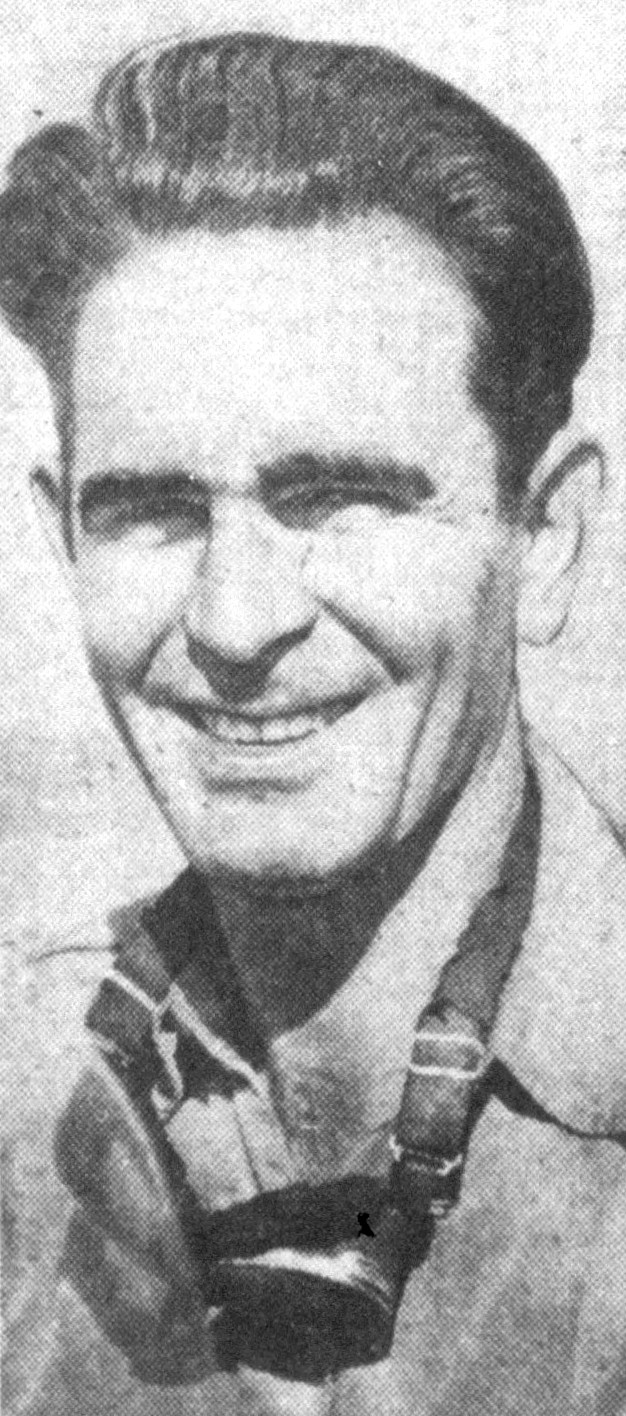
- Hansen, circa 1950
- Born: Melvin Loyd Hansen; July 7, 1911 Redfield, South Dakota, U.S.
- Died: June 5, 1963 (aged 51) Bloomington, California, U.S.

Champ Car career
- 21 races run over 7 years
- Best finish: 9th (tie) (1940)
- First race: 1939 Indianapolis 500 (Indianapolis)
- Last race: 1949 DuQuoin 100 (DuQuoin)
- First win: 1948 Atlanta 100 (Lakewood)
- Last win: 1949 Springfield 100 #1 (Springfield)
Wins	Podiums	Poles
2	3	2

Melvin Lloyd Hansen (born July 7, 1911 – June 5, 1963) was an American racing driver. Hansen was nicknamed the "Firecracker Kid" because he loved to throw the explosive devices under chairs and behind people who were gathered in groups.

== Racing career ==
Hansen grew up in Bloomington, California, and began racing in stock cars in 1931 at the Riverside Fairgrounds. He continued to race these cars at other Inland Empire tracks in Riverside and Colton in the early 1930s. As this early version of track roadsters waned, he switched to midget car racing, where he achieved great success.

=== Midget car career ===
Hansen's first big win was the 1939 Turkey Night Grand Prix at Gilmore Stadium in Rex Mays' Offenhauser. Hansen raced his midget car throughout the nation in 1940, and won 53 features that season. He also claimed the track championship at Fort Miami Speedway in Toledo, Ohio, that season. He won the 1942 track championship at VFW Motor Speedway in Detroit. Hansen raced in the United Racing Association in California, and won the 1945 URA Blue Circuit championship.

=== Championship car career ===
Hansen competed in six Indianapolis 500s. He best finish was an eighth-place finish in the 1940 Indianapolis 500. He won the 100-mile AAA Championship race at Atlanta, Georgia, in 1948, and won a 100-mile AAA Championship race at Springfield, Illinois, in 1949.

== Accident ==
Hansen was paralyzed after a midget racing crash on September 8, 1949, at Detroit, and he died on June 5, 1963, after being a paraplegic for fifteen years.

== Awards and honors ==
- Hansen was inducted in the National Midget Auto Racing Hall of Fame in 1993.

== Motorsports career results ==
=== Complete AAA Championship Car results ===
Year	1	2	3	4	5	6	7	8	9	10	11	12	13	14	Pos	Points
1946	INDY; 11	LAN; DNP	ATL	ISF	MIL	GOS									-	0
1947	INDY; 27	MIL	LAN; DNS	ATL	BAI	MIL; 4	GOS	MIL; 13	PIK	SPR; 13	ARL				25th	169.5
1948	ARL	INDY; 25	MIL; 14	LAN; DNS	MIL; 18	SPR; 16	MIL; 15	DUQ; 16	ATL; 1	PIK	SPR; 11	DUQ; 11			22nd	220
1949	ARL	INDY; DNS	MIL; DNS	TRE; 2	SPR; 1	MIL; 16	DUQ; 14	PIK	SYR; DNQ	DET	SPR	LAN	SAC	DMR	15th	376

- 1946 table only includes results of the six races run to "championship car" specifications. Points total includes the 71 races run to "big car" specifications.

=== Indianapolis 500 results ===
Year	Car	Start	Qual	Rank	Finish	Laps	Led	Retired
1939	49	14	121.683	25	19	113	0	Crash Pits
1940	31	5	124.753	7	8	194	0	Flagged
1941	9	21	124.599	6	29	11	0	Rod
1946	4	27	121.431	17	11	143	0	Crankshaft
1947	38	29	117.298	27	27	32	0	Pushed
1948	17	33	122.117	32	25	42	0	Too slow
Totals						535	0	

Starts	6
Poles	0
Front Row	0
Wins	0
Top 5	0
Top 10	1
Retired	5
