= Tony Willman =

American racing driver (1905–1941)

- Born: Anthony Peter Willman; April 28, 1905 South Milwaukee, Wisconsin, U.S.
- Died: October 12, 1941 (aged 36) Thompson, Connecticut, U.S.

Champ Car career
- 7 races run over 6 years
- Best finish: 19th (1941)
- First race: 1936 Vanderbilt Cup (Westbury)
- Last race: 1941 Syracuse 100 (Syracuse)
Wins	Podiums	Poles
0	0	0

Anthony Peter Willman (April 28, 1905 – October 12, 1941) was an American racing driver. He was killed in a midget car accident.

== Racing career ==
Willman started racing in 1926. Limited racing during the 1930s Great Depression significantly hurt Willman's career; only 31 national events were held in eight years. So Willman raced in Midwestern regional and local races. Willman won the 1934/35 indoor midget championship circuit of races in Milwaukee, Detroit, St. Louis, and Chicago. He toured the Midwest for the 1936 outdoor season and he won 145 races. In 1936, Willman won the Hankinson Speedway Circuit championship; the circuit featured races on 30 tracks in 17 states. He won the 1939 track championship at the quarter mile track inside the Wisconsin State Fair Park Speedway (now Milwaukee Mile); he repeated the track title in 1941.

Willman had misfortune at the Indianapolis 500 with his car breaking down during all four of his races while he was doing well. In 1941, he was running in fourth place at the 285 mile mark before a connecting rod broke. In 1938, Willman drove in relief for Harry McQuinn and finished seventh.

1941 was Willman's most successful year. He won 33 midget car races and the AAA National Short Track championship. One week before his death, Willman lapped the entire 32-car field in a 100-lap midget car event.

Willman died on October 12, 1941. He was racing in a midget car heat race at Thompson International Speedway when he hit the outside wall and he rolled on to the track. The last place car hit and killed him; in the first two laps he had passed 16 cars in the 20 car field. In his career, he had won a single 100-mile Speedway race, 44 sprint car main events, and 85 midget car events.

== Personal life ==
Willman was known to be soft-spoken and rarely talked about his racing accomplishments. He was well respected by his competitors; Tommy Hinnershitz said that Willman was the toughest driver that he competed against. Willman was married to Lorraine and he left a daughter named Betty and a son named Eugene who ended up becoming a midget car building and owner in the 1960s and 1970s.

== Awards and honors ==
- Willman was inducted in the National Sprint Car Hall of Fame in 1992.

== Motorsports career results ==
=== Indianapolis 500 results ===
Year	Car	Start	Qual	Rank	Finish	Laps	Led	Retired
1937	26	27	118.241	21	25	95	0	Rod
1938	10	26	118.458	25	27	47	0	Valve
1939	51	26	122.771	21	14	188	0	Fuel pump
1941	62	25	123.920	11	20	117	0	Rod
TotalsReference:						447	0	

Starts	4
Poles	0
Front Row	0
Wins	0
Top 5	0
Top 10	0
Retired	4
