= Frank Wearne =

American racing driver (1913–1985)

- Born: Frank Bardwell Wearne; May 27, 1913 Belle Plaine, Iowa, U.S.
- Died: February 21, 1985 (aged 71) Los Angeles, California, U.S.

Champ Car career
- 9 races run over 7 years
- Best finish: 7th (1940)
- First race: 1937 Indianapolis 500 (Indianapolis)
- Last race: 1947 Indianapolis 500 (Indianapolis)
Wins	Podiums	Poles
0	0	0

Frank Bardwell Wearne (May 27, 1913 – February 21, 1985) was an American racing driver.

== Biography ==
Wearne grew up in Altadena, California and began his racing career in roadsters on the Jeffries Ranch track in Burbank. He moved on to race at the Culver City Legion Speedway dirt track and Legion Ascot Speedway. After Ascot closed, Wearne raced successfully in the Pacific Northwest, then headed to the Midwest. An Indianapolis 500 specialist, he participated in the race seven times, with a best finish of seventh in 1940. He only made two Championship Car starts in races other than the Indianapolis 500. After retiring from racing, he worked at a brewery for 20 years

== Motorsports career results ==
=== Indianapolis 500 results ===
Year	Car	Start	Qual	Rank	Finish	Laps	Led	Retired
1937	44	33	118.220	22	24	99	0	Carburetor
1938	29	17	121.405	11	10	181	0	Flagged
1939	14	17	125.074	11	9	200	0	Running
1940	9	7	123.216	12	7	195	0	Flagged
1941	7	6	123.890	12	8	200	0	Running
1946	7	29	121.233	19	8	197	0	Flagged
1947	31	15	117.716	26	14	128	0	Spun T3
Totals						1200	0	

Starts	7
Poles	0
Front Row	0
Wins	0
Top 5	0
Top 10	5
Retired	2
