= George Barringer =

American racing driver (1906–1946)

- Born: George William Barringer; May 10, 1906 Cleburne, Texas, U.S.
- Died: September 2, 1946 (aged 40) Atlanta, Georgia, U.S.

Champ Car career
- 17 races run over 9 years
- Best finish: 6th (1939)
- First race: 1932 Roby 100 (Roby)
- Last race: 1946 Atlanta 100 (Lakewood)
| Wins | Podiums | Poles |
|---|---|---|
| 0 | 2 | 0 |

George William Barringer (May 10, 1906 – September 2, 1946) was an American racing driver, active during the 1930s and 1940s.

== Racing career ==
Barringer made 17 Championship Car starts with a best finish of second at Springfield in August 1935 and Milwaukee in August 1939. In 1941, Barringer debuted a revolutionary rear-engined racecar at the Indianapolis 500; he only placed 32nd after a garage fire destroyed the car before the race began. He and George Robson were killed in the same multicar pile-up at the Lakewood Speedway in Atlanta, Georgia.

== Motorsports career results ==
=== Indianapolis 500 results ===
| Year | Car | Start | Qual | Rank | Finish | Laps | Led | Retired |
|---|---|---|---|---|---|---|---|---|
| 1934 | 18 | 12 | 113.859 | 11 | 15 | 161 | 0 | Bent front axle |
| 1936 | 17 | 14 | 112.700 | 27 | 8 | 200 | 0 | Running |
| 1939 | 41 | 15 | 120.935 | 28 | 6 | 200 | 0 | Running |
| 1940 | 6 | 16 | 121.889 | 22 | 14 | 191 | 0 | Flagged |
| 1941 | 35 | 32 | 122.299 | 18 | 32 | 0 | 0 | DNS |
| 1946 | 26 | 24 | 120.628 | 22 | 29 | 27 | 0 | Gears |
| Totals | | | | | | 779 | 0 | |

| Starts | 6 |
| Poles | 0 |
| Front Row | 0 |
| Wins | 0 |
| Top 5 | 0 |
| Top 10 | 2 |
| Retired | 3 |

== Sources ==
- Profile at Motorsport Memorial
