= Mauri Rose =

American racing driver (1906–1981)

- Born: Maurice Rose; May 26, 1906 Columbus, Ohio, U.S.
- Died: January 1, 1981 (aged 74) Royal Oak, Michigan, U.S.

Championship titles
- AAA Championship Car (1936); Major victories Indianapolis 500 (1941, 1947, 1948)

Champ Car career
- 36 races run over 16 years
- Best finish: 1st (1936)
- First race: 1932 Syracuse 100 (Syracuse)
- Last race: 1951 Indianapolis 500 (Indianapolis)
- First win: 1932 Detroit 100 (Detroit)
- Last win: 1948 Indianapolis 500 (Indianapolis)
Wins	Podiums	Poles
6	14	1

Formula One World Championship career
- Active years: 1950–1951
- Team: Diedt
- Entries: 2
- Championships: 0
- Wins: 0
- Podiums: 1
- Career points: 4
- Pole positions: 0
- Fastest laps: 0
- First entry: 1950 Indianapolis 500
- Last entry: 1951 Indianapolis 500

Maurice Rose (May 26, 1906 – January 1, 1981) was an American racing driver. He won the Indianapolis 500 in 1941, 1947, and 1948, becoming the race's third three-time winner. He also won the AAA National Championship in 1936.

== Racing career ==
=== Indianapolis 500 career ===
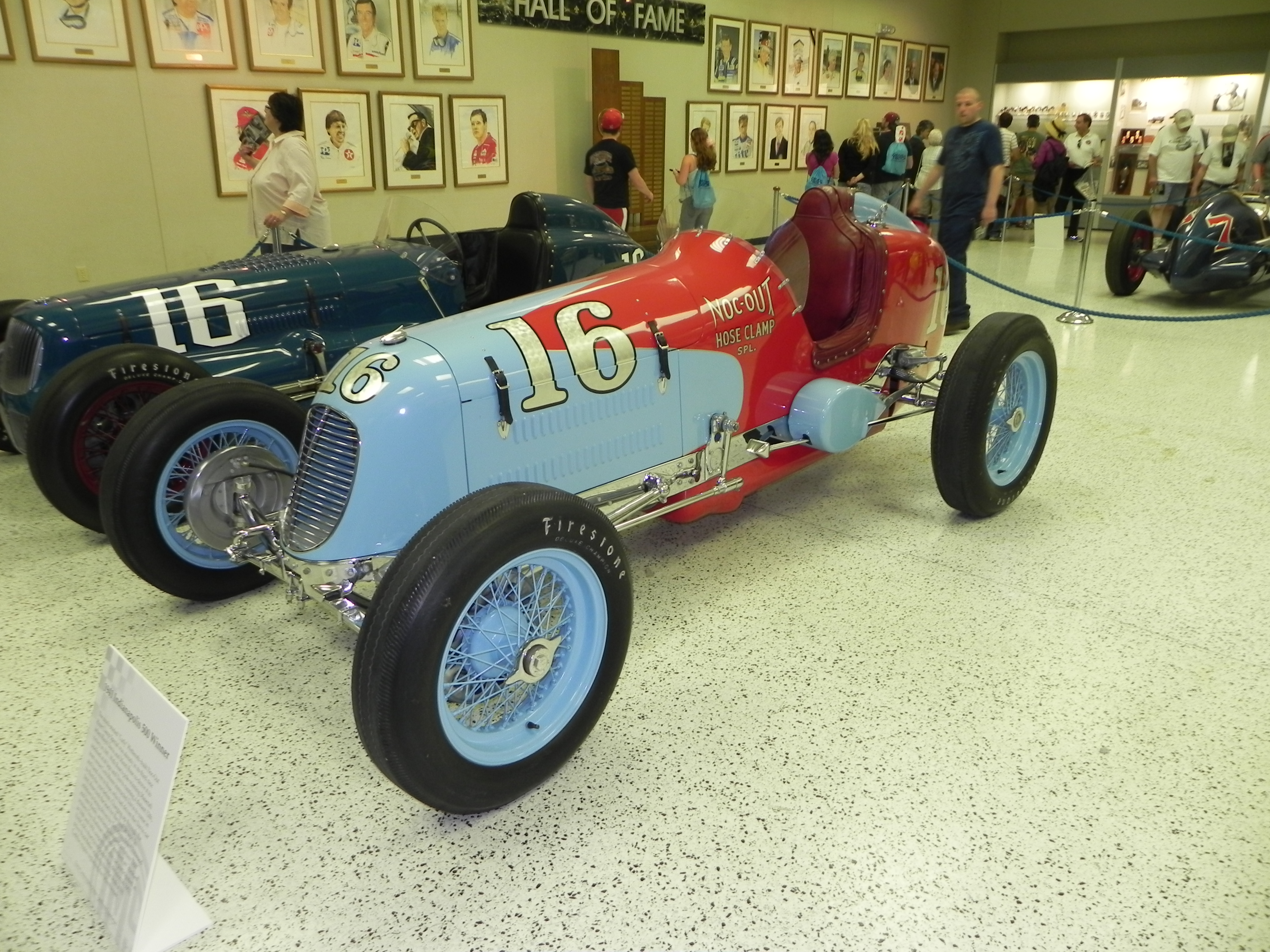
Rose's winning car from the 1941 Indianapolis 500 - Rose took over the car from Floyd Davis on lap 73

Although Rose had driven in every Indianapolis 500 since 1933, he earned his first pole position when he put his Maserati on the pole for the 1941 Indianapolis 500; but spark plug problems sidelined his car after sixty laps. He then took over the Wetteroth/Offenhauser car being driven by Floyd Davis that had started in 17th place. Rose went on to win. In 1947 and 1948, Rose captured back-to-back Indianapolis 500s driving one of the Diedt/Offenhauser Blue Crown Spark Plug Specials, owned and prepared by veteran driver/car owner Lou Moore.

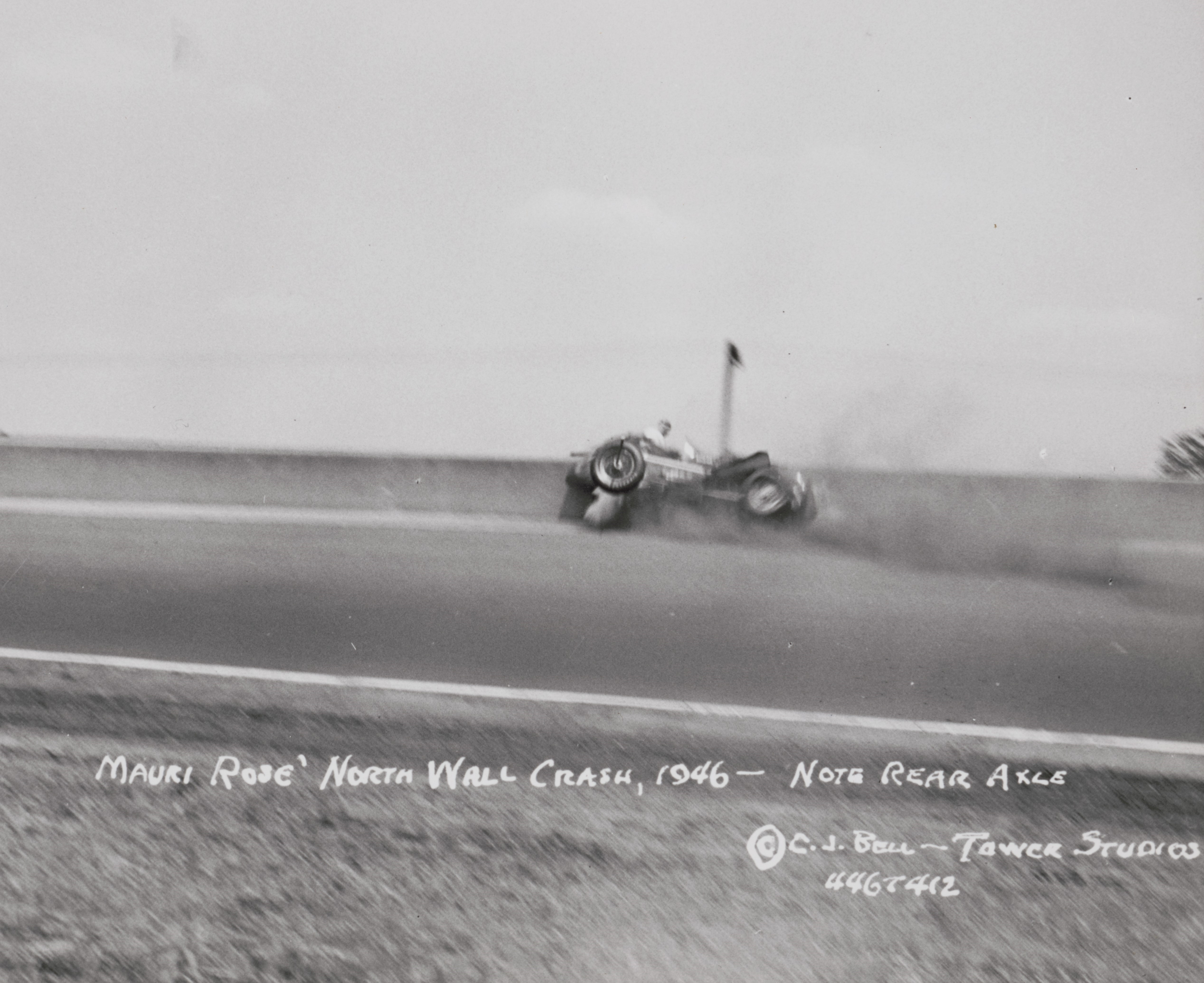
Rose involved in an accident on lap 40 of the 1946 Indianapolis 500

Late in the 1947 race, Rose found himself lying second to his rookie teammate, Bill Holland, when both were given a sign reading "EZY" from pit lane. Holland reduced speed, but Rose ignored the sign and continued on. Rose closed on Holland and to his amazement, Holland gave way without a battle and even gave Rose a friendly wave as he went past on his way to victory. But Holland thought he had more than a lap lead on Rose, instead of just a few seconds. Holland was furious afterward.

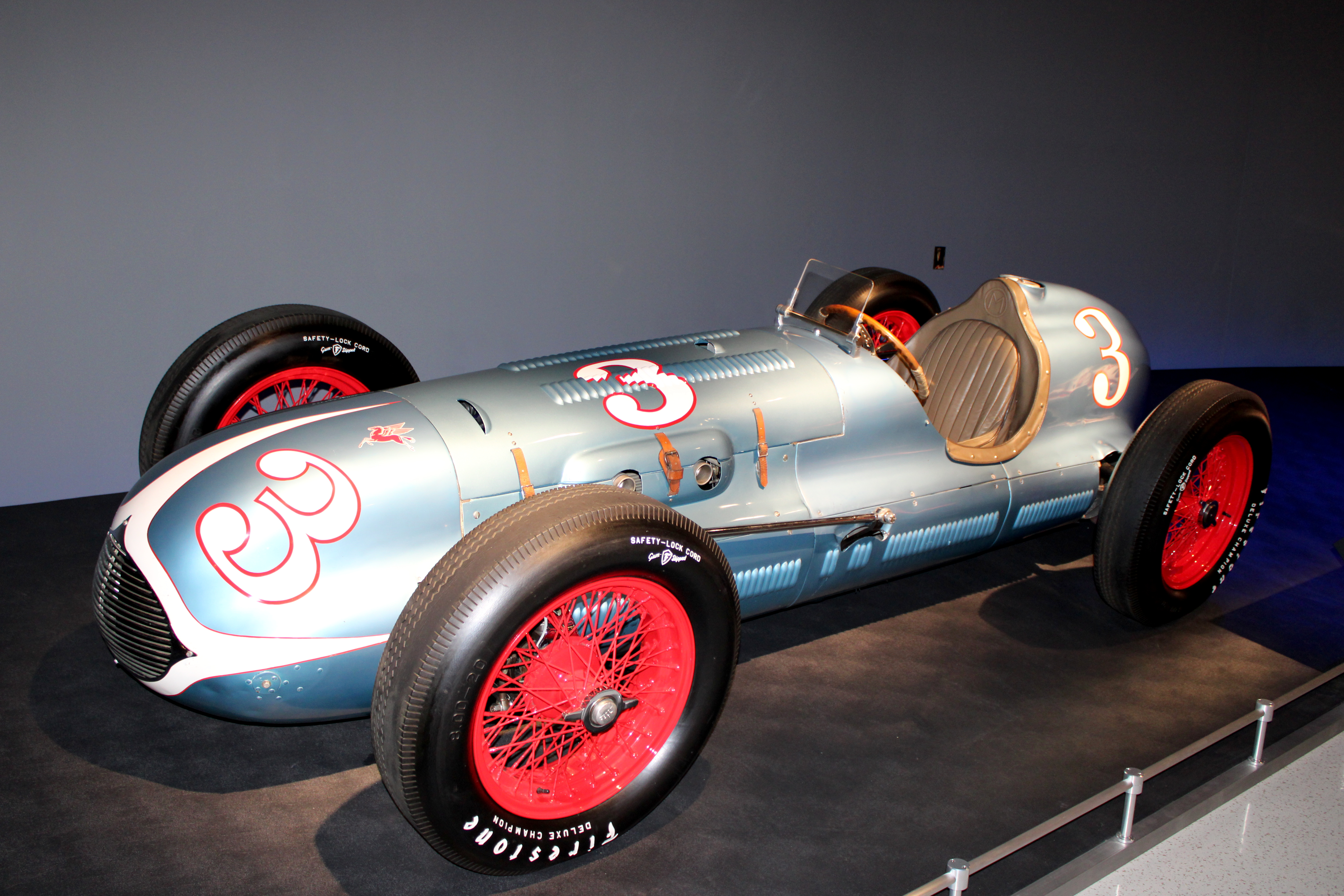
Rose's winning car from the 1947 and 1948 Indianapolis 500s

In 1949, with Holland leading and Rose again running second late in the race, Rose set out to overtake his now-veteran teammate. Rose again ignored car owner Lou Moore's "EZ" signs from the pits and continued to push in pursuit of Holland. This time, Rose's car broke while Holland cruised home to victory—and Moore fired Rose on the spot after the race for disobeying team orders.

Rose made his fifteenth and final Indianapolis 500 start in the 1951 race. Knocked out from an accident after 126 laps, the forty-five-year-old Rose retired to a home in California. For the 1967 race, officials of the Indianapolis Motor Speedway invited him to drive the pace car.

=== World Drivers' Championship career ===
The AAA/USAC-sanctioned Indianapolis 500 was included in the FIA World Drivers' Championship from 1950 through 1960. Drivers competing at Indianapolis during those years were credited with World Drivers' Championship participation, and were eligible to score WDC points alongside those which they may have scored towards the AAA/USAC National Championship.

Rose participated in two World Drivers' Championship races at Indianapolis. He finished in the top three once, and scored four World Drivers' Championship points.

== Post-racing career and life ==
Rose worked for General Motors both during and after his racing career. He was heavily involved in the development of the Chevrolet Corvette into a competitive racing machine.

Both of Rose's children were disabled by polio. While his career in racing was filled with success, he considered his most important accomplishment to be his invention of a device that made it possible for those without the use of their legs to drive an automobile.

== Awards and honors ==
Rose has been inducted into the following halls of fame:

- Auto Racing Hall of Fame (1967)
- Michigan Sports Hall of Fame (1972)
- Michigan Motor Sports Hall of Fame (1982)
- Eastern Motorsports Press Association Hall of Fame (1989)
- International Motorsports Hall of Fame (1994)
- Motorsports Hall of Fame of America (1996)
- International Jewish Sports Hall of Fame (2007)

Rose has been awarded the following honors:

- Automotive Hall of Fame Distinguished Service Citation (1966)

== Motorsports career results ==
=== AAA Championship Car results ===
Year	1	2	3	4	5	6	7	8	9	10	11	12	13	14	15	Pos	Points
1941	INDY; 1	MIL; 3	NYS; 4													9th	245
1946	INDY; 23	LAN; 12	ATL	ISF; 2	MIL; 6	GOS; DNP										25th	240
1947	INDY; 1	MIL; DNP	LAN	ATL	BAI	MIL	GOS	MIL	PIK	SPR	ARL					3rd	1,000
1948	ARL	INDY; 1	MIL	LAN	MIL	SPR	MIL	DUQ	ATL	PIK	SPR	DUQ				3rd	1,000
1949	ARL	INDY; 13	MIL	TRE	SPR	MIL	DUQ	PIK	SYR	DET	SPR	LAN	SAC	DMR		-	0
1950	INDY; 3	MIL	LAN	SPR	MIL	PIK	SYR	DET	SPR	SAC	PHX	BAY	DAR			15th	483
1951	INDY; 14	MIL	LAN	DAR	SPR	MIL	DUQ	DUQ	PIK	SYR	DET	DNC	SJS	PHX	BAY	-	0

- 1946 table only includes results of the six races run to "championship car" specifications. Points total includes the 71 races run to "big car" specifications.

=== Indianapolis 500 results ===
Year	Car	Start	Qual	Rank	Finish	Laps	Led	Retired
1933	3	42	117.649	6	35	48	0	Timing gears
1934	9	4	116.044	7	2	200	68	Running
1935	2	10	116.470	9	20	103	0	Studs
1936	36	30	113.890	21	4	200	0	Running
1937	1	8	118.540	19	18	127	0	Oil line
1938	27	9	119.796	20	13	165	0	Supercharger
1939	16	8	124.896	13	8	200	0	Running
1940	7	3	125.624	3	3	200	5	Running
1941	3	1	128.691	1	26	60	6	Spark plugs
1941	16	17	121.106	25	1	128	39	Running
1946	8	9	124.065	10	23	40	8	Crash T3
1947	27	3	120.040	20	1	200	34	Running
1948	3	3	129.129	4	1	200	81	Running
1949	3	10	127.759	19	13	192	0	Magneto strap
1950	31	3	132.319	6	3	137	15	Running
1951	16	5	133.422	18	14	126	0	Crash T4
**Totals**						2326	256	

Starts	15
Poles	1
Front Row	5
Wins	3
Top 5	7
Top 10	8
Retired	8

=== FIA World Drivers' Championship results ===
(key) (Races in bold indicate pole position, races in italics indicate fastest lap)

Year	Entrant	Chassis	Engine	1	2	3	4	5	6	7	8	WDC	Pts
1950	Howard Keck	Diedt	Offenhauser 4.5 L4	GBR	MON	500; 3	SUI	BEL	FRA	ITA		12th	4
1951	Howard Keck	Diedt	Offenhauser 4.5 L4	SUI	500; 14	BEL	FRA	GBR	GER	ITA	ESP	NC	0

Preceded by Wilbur Shaw	Indianapolis 500 Winner; 1941	Succeeded by George Robson
Preceded by George Robson	Indianapolis 500 Winner; 1947–1948	Succeeded by Bill Holland
