= Floyd Davis =

American racing driver (1905–1977)

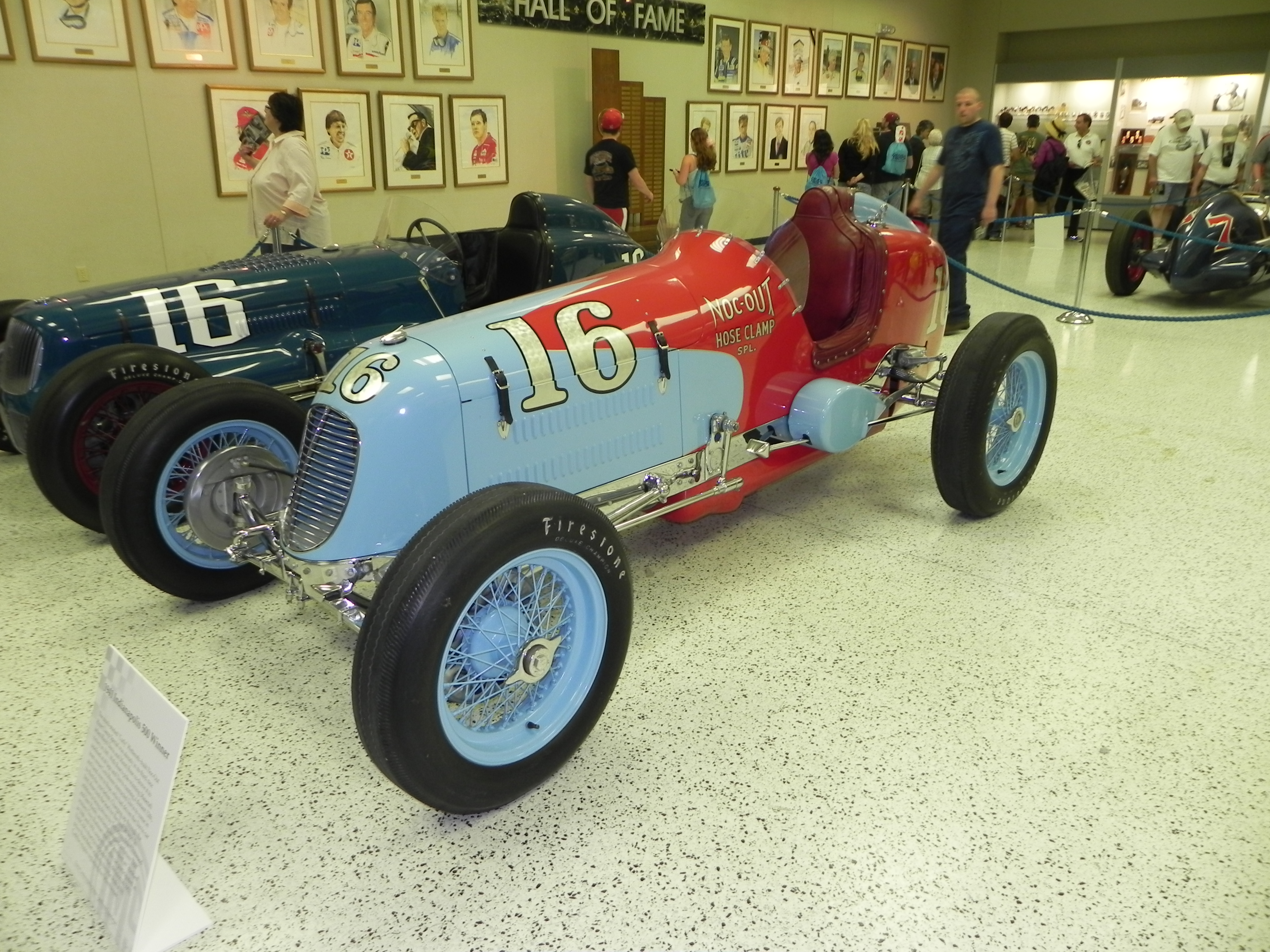
- The winning car from the 1941 Indianapolis 500 - Mauri Rose took over the car from Davis on lap 73
- Born: Floyd Eldon Davis; March 9, 1905 Oakford, Illinois, U.S.
- Died: May 31, 1977 (aged 72) Indianapolis, Indiana, U.S.

Championship titles
- Major victories Indianapolis 500 (1941 (co-winner))

Champ Car career
- 18 races run over 9 years
- Best finish: 4th (tie) (1941)
- First race: 1935 St. Paul 100 (St. Paul)
- Last race: 1948 Atlanta 100 (Lakewood)
- First win: 1941 Indianapolis 500 (Indianapolis)
Wins	Podiums	Poles
1	1	0

Floyd Eldon Davis (March 9, 1905 – May 31, 1977) was an American racing driver, and the co-winner of the 1941 Indianapolis 500. Davis drove the first 72 laps of the 1941 race before being replaced by Mauri Rose, who completed the race in the lead.

== Co-winner of the Indianapolis 500 ==
During the 1941 Indianapolis 500, Davis had been driving the Noc-Out Hose Clamp car for sixty laps, moving from 17th to 12th place when teammate Mauri Rose, the pole sitter, began experiencing problems with his car, the Elgin Piston Pin. The films show that he wasn't too happy when at lap 72, team owner Lou Moore pulled Davis from his car and replaced him with Rose. “I was ready to go into the lead when they called me in,” Davis later joked.

That is what Rose did, winning the first of his three 500 championships, and earning Davis an asterisk in the history books as a co-winner, although he never led a single lap in any of his races. Davis received a 50-50 split of the prize money, but never drove in another 500, racing only sparingly in 1946 and 1948.

Davis had driven in three previous 500s, coming in 15th in 1937, 27th in 1939, and 20th in 1940.

Davis is buried at Crown Hill Cemetery in Indianapolis (Section 53 Lot 320).

== Motorsports career results ==
=== AAA Championship Car results ===
Year	1	2	3	4	5	6	7	8	9	10	11	12	Pos	Points
1941	INDY; 1	MIL	NYS; 5										4th (tie)	450
1946	INDY	LAN	ATL	ISF; 6	MIL	GOS							54th	80
1948	ARL	INDY	MIL	LAN	MIL	SPR	MIL	DUQ; 9	ATL; 7	PIK	SPR	DUQ	36th	87.5

- 1946 table only includes results of the six races run to "championship car" specifications. Points total includes the 71 races run to "big car" specifications.

=== Indianapolis 500 results ===
Year	Car	Start	Qual	Rank	Finish	Laps	Led	Retired
1937	32	24	118.942	14	15	190	0	Crash T3
1939	56	29	119.375	29	27	43	0	Shock absorber
1940	61	33	120.797	30	20	157	0	Flagged
1941	16	17	121.106	25	1	72	0	Relieved
Totals						462	0	

Starts	4
Poles	0
Front Row	0
Wins	1
Top 5	1
Top 10	1
Retired	2

Preceded by Wilbur Shaw	Indianapolis 500 Winner; 1941	Succeeded by George Robson
