= Wilbur Shaw =

American racing driver (1902–1954)

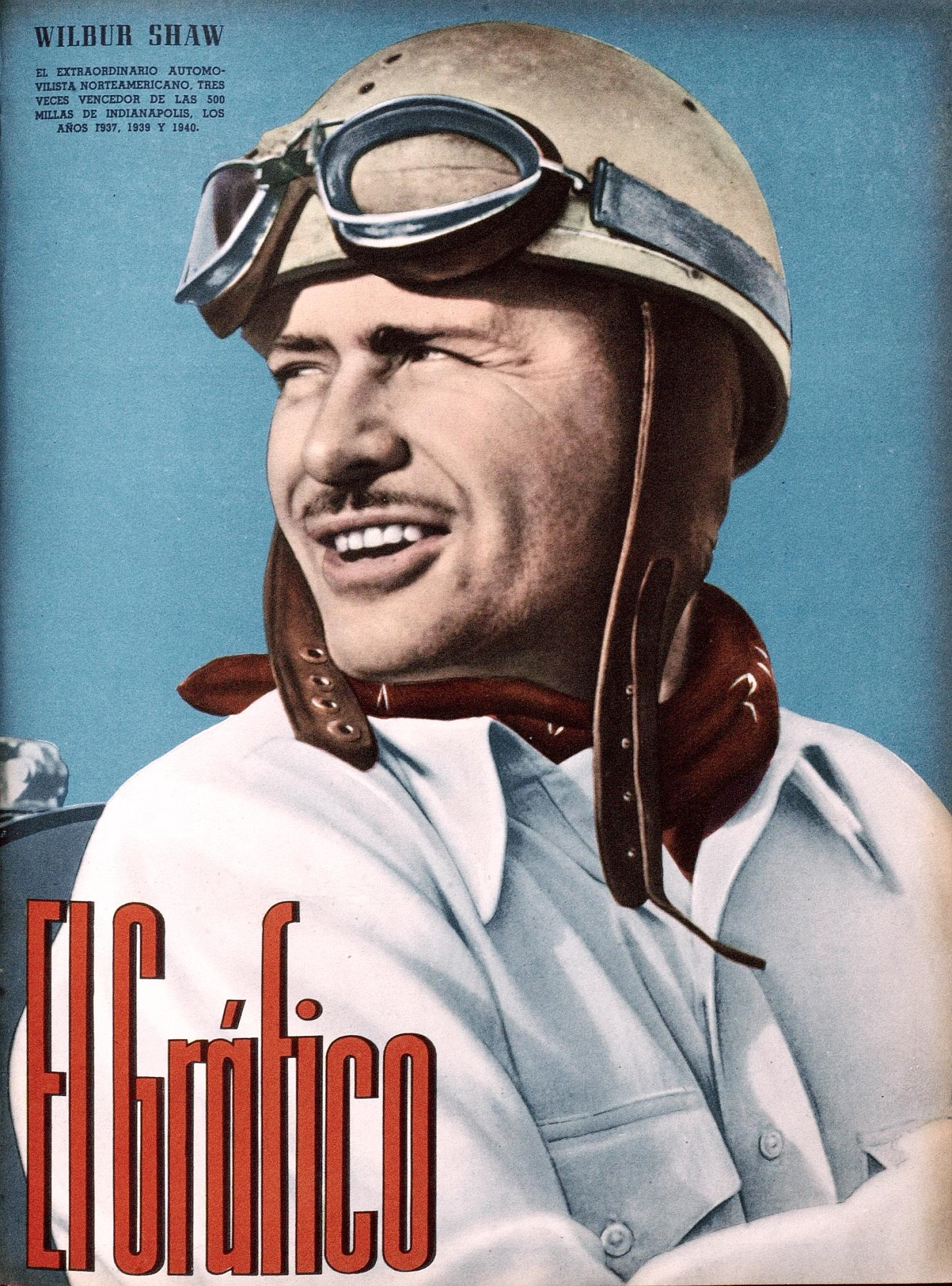
- Shaw on the cover of El Gráfico magazine, 1940
- Born: Warren Wilbur Shaw; October 31, 1902 Shelbyville, Indiana, U.S.
- Died: October 30, 1954 (aged 51) Decatur, Indiana, U.S.

Championship titles
- AAA Championship Car (1937, 1939); Major victories Indianapolis 500 (1937, 1939, 1940)

Champ Car career
- 38 races run over 15 years
- Best finish: 1st (1937, 1939)
- First race: 1927 Indianapolis 500 (Indianapolis)
- Last race: 1941 Indianapolis 500 (Indianapolis)
- First win: 1929 Syracuse 100 (Syracuse)
- Last win: 1940 Indianapolis 500 (Indianapolis)
Wins	Podiums	Poles
6	12	1

Warren Wilbur Shaw (October 31, 1902 – October 30, 1954) was an American racing driver. The second three-time winner of the Indianapolis 500 (1937, 1939 and 1940), he is also remembered for serving as president of the Indianapolis Motor Speedway from 1945 until his death in 1954.

== Early life ==
Shaw was born in Shelbyville, Indiana on October 31, 1902. At 16, he moved to Indianapolis and found work in multiple automotive-related jobs.

== Racing career ==
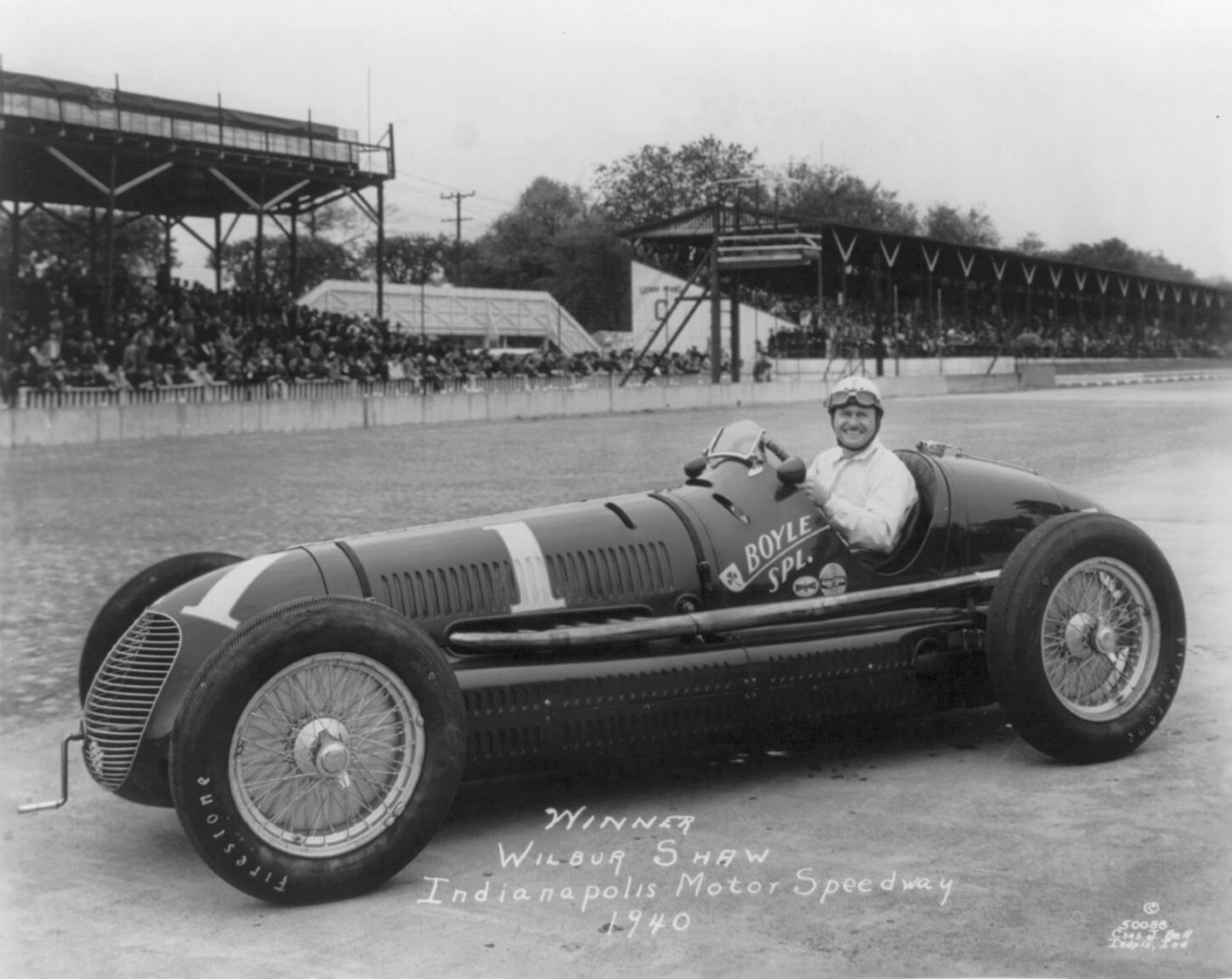
Shaw before qualifications at the 1940 Indianapolis 500

Shaw first participated in the 1927 Indianapolis 500. He eventually won the Indianapolis 500 race three times, in 1937, 1939, and 1940. Shaw was the second person to win the 500 three times, and the first to win it twice in a row. In 1939 and 1940, he won driving a Maserati 8CTF named the 'Boyle Special.' In the 1941 race, Shaw was injured when his car crashed; it was later discovered that a defective wheel had been placed on his car.

== Indianapolis Motor Speedway President ==
During World War II, Shaw was hired by the tire manufacturer Firestone Tire and Rubber Company to test a synthetic rubber automobile tire at the Indianapolis Motor Speedway (IMS), which had been closed due to the war. He was dismayed at the dilapidated condition of the racetrack and quickly contacted then-owner Eddie Rickenbacker, the World War I flying ace and president and founder of Eastern Air Lines. When the United States entered World War II, ending racing at Indianapolis and elsewhere for the duration, Rickenbacker padlocked the gates, and the racecourse slowly begin to disintegrate.

During a meeting soon after the test, Rickenbacker informed Shaw that what was left of the track would be demolished, and the land turned into a housing subdivision. Shaw sent out letters to the major car manufacturers trying to find a backer to buy the speedway. However, all indicated that should they buy the IMS they would turn it into a private testing facility for their own cars only.

Shaw then met Terre Haute businessman Tony Hulman who had inherited his family's business, Hulman & Company, a wholesale grocer and producer of coffee and baking powder, Clabber Girl.

A lifelong fan of automobile racing in general and the "500" in particular, Hulman listened with great interest to what Shaw had to say. Despite what Hulman saw amongst the weeds and deterioration when Shaw took him to Indianapolis, he purchased the Speedway from Rickenbacker in November 1945 for the sum of $750,000.

As a reward for his efforts to revive the Speedway, Shaw was appointed as its president, where he would have complete day-to-day control over the track. To this job, Shaw brought his extensive knowledge of the business of auto racing, something Hulman would admit that he himself didn't have, and Shaw's hard work only cemented the reputation of the "500" as the "Greatest Spectacle in Racing."

Hulman poured money into improvements, and Shaw delivered the race to enthusiastic crowds, which grew in number by the year. The Indianapolis "500" of the late forties and early fifties was a special event through the work of Hulman and Shaw, although Hulman was always sure to point out that it was Wilbur putting it all together.

== Death ==
Shaw was killed in an airplane crash near Decatur, Indiana, on October 30, 1954, one day before his fifty-second birthday. The pilot, Ray Grimes, 40, and Ernest Roose, 41, who was the motorways official artist, were also killed. After his death he left behind a wife, Cathleen "Boots" Stearns and a 9-year-old Warren Wilbur Shaw Jr., or "Bill".

== Other work and legacy ==
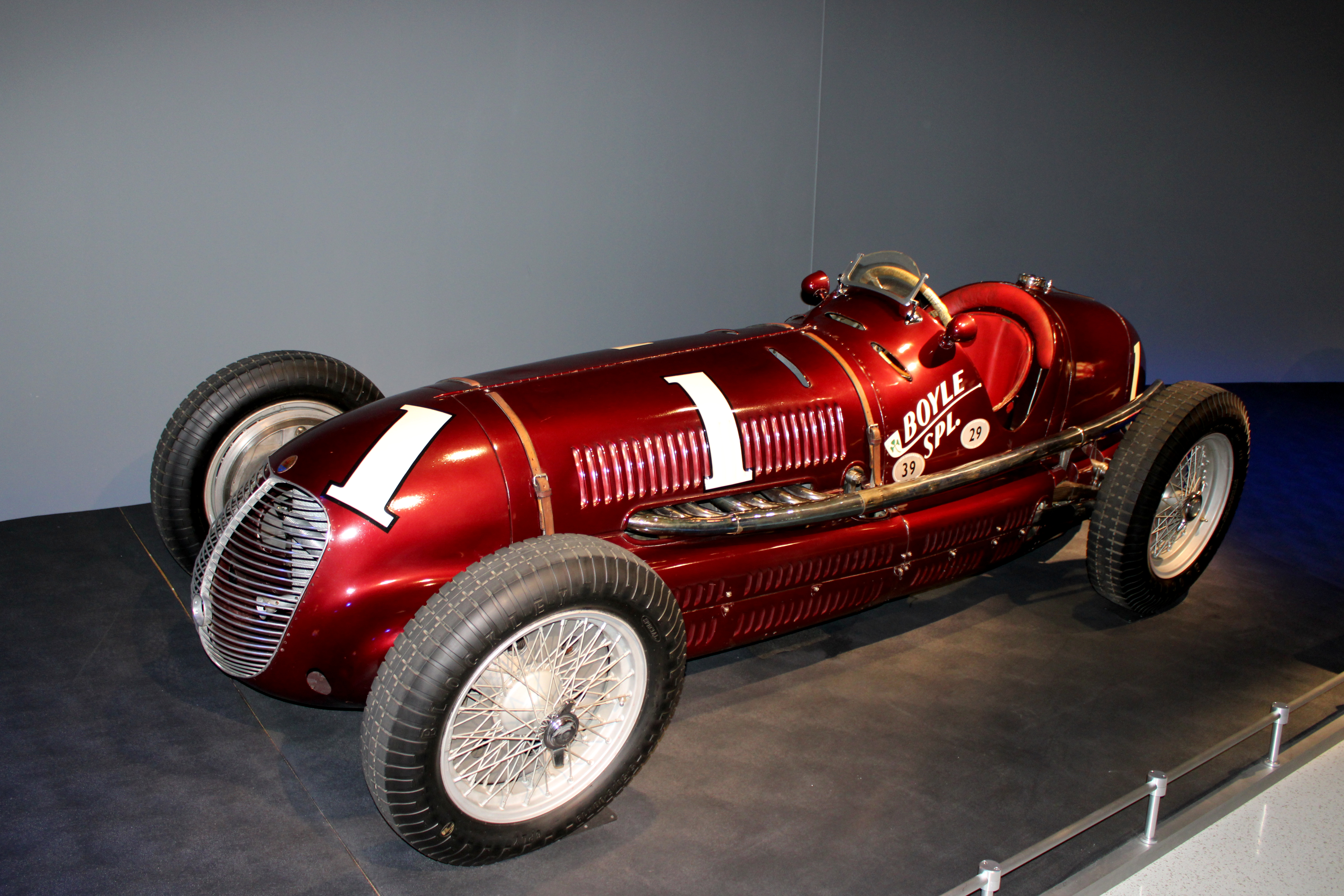
Shaw's winning car from the 1939 and 1940 Indianapolis 500s

Shaw was the automotive test evaluator for Popular Science magazine. As the automotive test evaluator, Shaw's articles were superior to those of his contemporaries in that they gave consistently accurate reports without relying on Popular Science's lead in the marketplace over competitors such as Mechanix Illustrated.

Shaw's highly regarded autobiography, "Gentlemen, Start your Engines," was published in 1955, and covers events through 1953.

As of 2025, Shaw is the last Indiana native to win the Indianapolis 500.

== Awards and honors ==
Shaw has been inducted into the following halls of fame:

- Auto Racing Hall of Fame (1963)
- Automotive Hall of Fame (1987)
- National Sprint Car Hall of Fame (1990)
- International Motorsports Hall of Fame (1991)
- Motorsports Hall of Fame of America (1991)

Shaw has been awarded the following honors:

- Automotive Hall of Fame Distinguished Service Citation (1951)

== Motorsports career results ==
=== Indianapolis 500 results ===
Year	Car	Start	Qual	Rank	Finish	Laps	Led	Retired
1927	29	19	104.465	32	4	200	0	Running
1928	1	29	100.956	25	25	42	0	Timing gears
1930	3	25	106.135	5	24	54	0	Wrist pin
1932	3	22	114.326	5	17	157	27	Rear axle
1933	17	23	115.497	12	2	200	0	Running
1934	3	2	117.647	3	28	15	0	Lost oil
1935	14	20	116.854	7	2	200	5	Running
1936	3	9	117.503	4	7	200	51	Running
1937	6	2	122.791	4	1	200	131	Running
1938	1	7	120.987	13	2	200	0	Running
1939	2	3	128.977	4	1	200	51	Running
1940	1	2	127.065	2	1	200	136	Running
1941	2	3	127.836	3	18	151	107	Crash T1
Totals						2019	508	

Starts	13
Poles	0
Front Row	5
Wins	3
Top 5	7
Top 10	8
Retired	5

Preceded by Louis Meyer	Indianapolis 500 Winner; 1937	Succeeded by Floyd Roberts
Preceded by Floyd Roberts	Indianapolis 500 Winner; 1939-1940	Succeeded by Mauri Rose; Floyd Davis
