= 1936 Vanderbilt Cup =

American auto race

(United States) 1936 Vanderbilt Cup
Race details
- Race 4 of 4 in the 1936 AAA Championship Car season
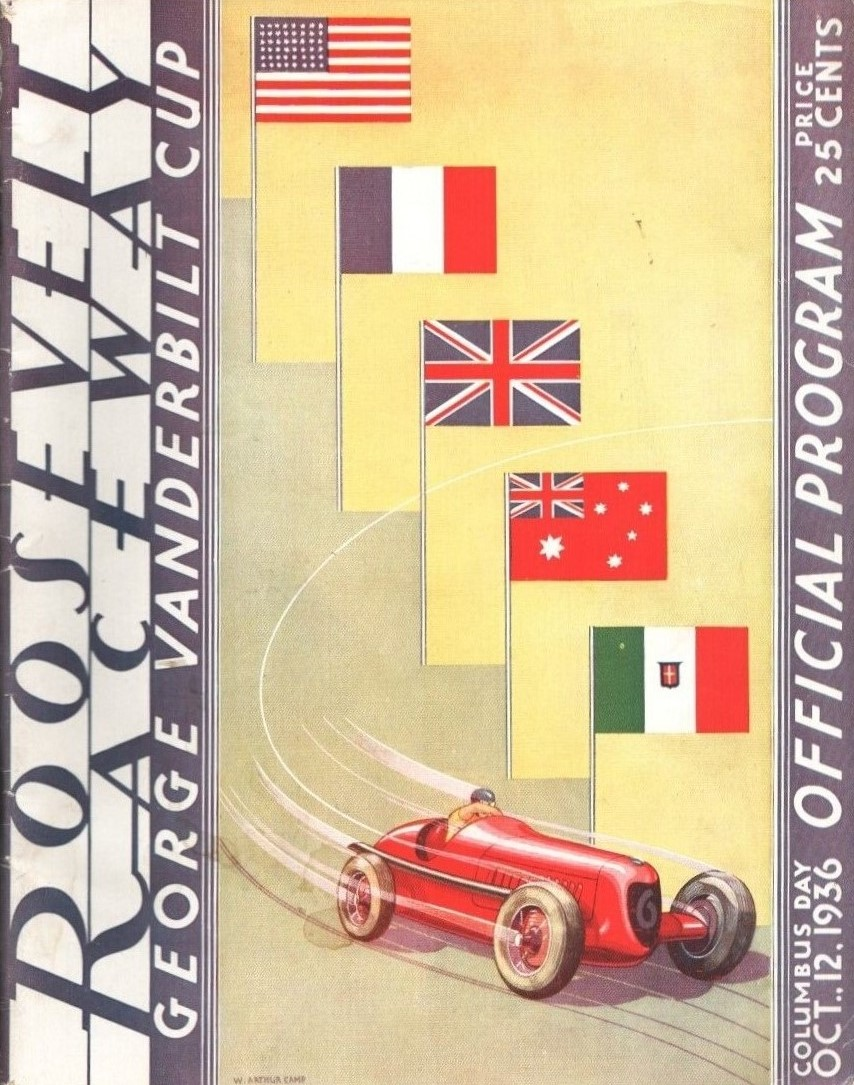
- Date: October 12, 1936
- Official name: I George Vanderbilt Cup
- Location: Roosevelt Raceway, Westbury, New York, United States
- Course: Purpose-built race course 3.97 mi / 6.39 km
- Distance: 75 laps 297.75 mi / 479.25 km

Pole position
- Driver: (Kingdom of Italy) Antonio Brivio (Scuderia Ferrari)
- Time: 17:54.15

Fastest lap
- Driver: (Kingdom of Italy) Tazio Nuvolari (Scuderia Ferrari)
- Time: 3:25.42 (on lap of 75)

Podium
- First: (Kingdom of Italy) Tazio Nuvolari (Scuderia Ferrari)
- Second: (France) Jean-Pierre Wimille (Bugatti)
- Third: (Kingdom of Italy) Antonio Brivio (Scuderia Ferrari)

The 1936 Vanderbilt Cup (formally known as I George Vanderbilt Cup) was a Championship Car race that was held on October 12, 1936, at Roosevelt Raceway near Westbury, New York. It was the fourth and final race of the 1936 AAA Championship Car season, not counting the non-championship events. The race, contested over 75 laps of 6.39 km (3.97 mi), was won by Tazio Nuvolari driving an Alfa Romeo 12C-36 from eighth starting position.

== Background ==
For the history of the Vanderbilt Cup: see Vanderbilt Cup

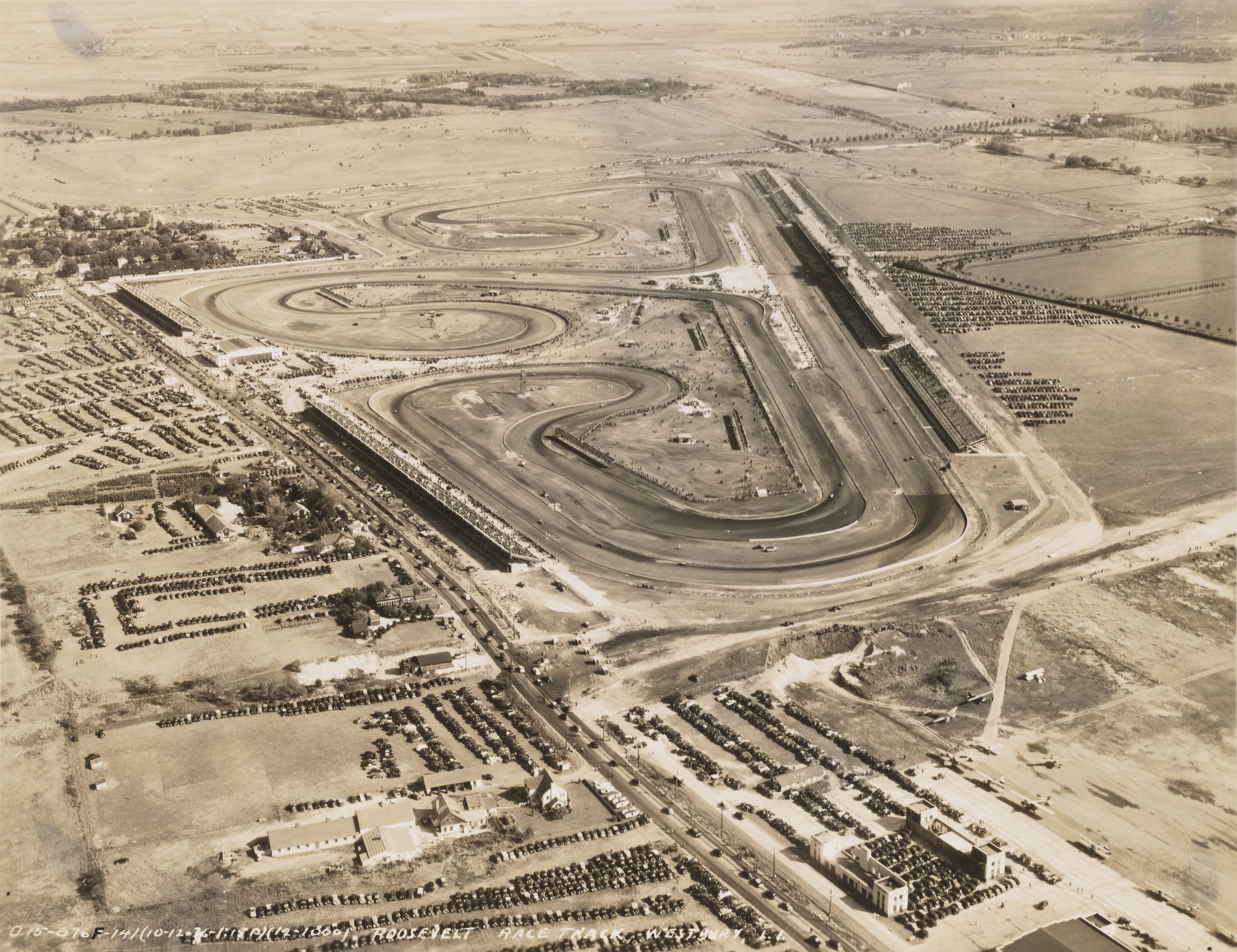
Army Air Forces aerial photograph of Roosevelt Raceway taken during the race

This was the first time that the Vanderbilt Cup was held since 1916. George Washington Vanderbilt III, the nephew of the founder of the Vanderbilt Cup, William Kissam Vanderbilt II, sponsored a 300-mile race (480 km) in 1936 at Roosevelt Raceway. Just as in the original races, European drivers were enticed by the substantial prize money - Scuderia Ferrari entered three Alfa Romeo racers. However, because of little American competition and an unexciting course layout, the race was organized for only two years. Both races were won by Europeans. After 1937, the Vanderbilt Cup would not be raced until 1960, and in a far less prestigious form.

== Entries ==
No.	Driver	Car	Note
2	(United States) Bill Cummings	Miller-Offenhauser	
3	(United States) Wilbur Shaw	Shaw-Offenhauser	
4	(United States) Emil Andres	Stevens-Offenhauser	
5	(United States) Shorty Cantlon	Miller	
6	(United States) Chuck Tabor	Duesenberg-Offenhauser	
6	(United States) Chet Gardner	Duesenberg-Offenhauser	DNS - Tabor drove the #6 car
7	(United States) Billy Winn	Miller	
8	(Italy) Tazio Nuvolari	Alfa Romeo 12C-36	
9	(Italy) Antonio Brivio	Alfa Romeo 12C-36	
10	(Italy) Nino Farina	Alfa Romeo 12C-36	
12	(Australia) Frederick McEvoy	Maserati 4CM	
12	(Italy) Carlo Felice Trossi	Maserati 4CM	
14	(United States) Frank Brisko	Miller-Brisko	
15	(United States) Deacon Litz	Miller	
15	(United States) Tony Willman	Miller	
16	(France) Raymond Sommer	Alfa Romeo Tipo B	
17	(United States) Chet Gardner	Miller	
17	(United States) Frank Beeder	Miller	DNS - Gardner drove the #17 car
18	(France) Jean-Pierre Wimille	Bugatti T59	
19	(United States) Zeke Meyer	?-Offenhauser	DNQ - no qualifying attempt
21	(United States) Babe Stapp	Shaw-Offenhauser	
22	(United States) Ted Horn	Wetteroth-Miller	
23	(United States) Russ Snowberger	?-Offenhauser	
24	(France) Philippe Étancelin	Maserati V8RI	
25	(United States) Floyd Davis	?-Offenhauser	
26	(United States) Phil Shafer	Miller	
27	(United States) George Connor	Weil-Miller	
28	(United States) Dave Evans	Bugatti T51	
29	(France) "Raph"	Maserati V8RI	
32	(United States) Mauri Rose	Miller-Offenhauser	
33	(United States) Rex Mays	Adams-Sparks	DNS - crash in practice
34	(United States) Al Putnam	Studebaker	
35	(United States) Freddie Winnai	Mercedes	DNA
36	(United States) Chet Miller	Rigling-Carew	
37	(United Kingdom) Brian Lewis	ERA B-Type	
37	(Australia) Sidney Cotton	ERA B-Type	DNS - Lewis drove the #37 car
38	(United States) Joel Thorne	?-Miller	
39	(United States) Frank McGurk	?	DNS - crash in practice
42	(United States) Tony Willman	Stevens-Miller	
43	(United States) Jimmy Snyder	Stevens-Offenhauser	
44	(United States) Tony Gulotta	Stevens-Miller	
45	(United Kingdom) Earl Howe	ERA B-Type	
46	(United Kingdom) Pat Fairfield	ERA B-Type	
47	(United Kingdom) Brian Lewis	Bugatti	DNS - cracked cylinder head in practice
48	(United Kingdom) Teddy Rayson	Maserati 4CM	
48	(United Kingdom) Goldie Gardner	Maserati 4CM	DNS - Rayson drove the #48 car
49	(United States) Overton Phillips	Bugatti	
51	(United States) Bob Swanson	Miller-Offenhauser	
51	(United States) Billy Devore	Miller-Offenhauser	DNS - Swanson drove the #51 car
52	(United States) Lewis Balus	Duesenberg	
53	(United States) Louis Tomei	?-Offenhauser	
53	(United States) Bob Swanson	?-Offenhauser	DNS - Tomei drove the #53 car
56	(United States) Ben Brandfon	Duesenberg	DNS
57	(United States) Ted Chamberlain	Duesenberg-Miller	
57	(United States) George Wingerter	Duesenberg-Miller	DNS - Chamberlain drove the #57 car
59	(United States) Rick Decker	Duesenberg-Miller	
61	(United States) John Cebula	Duesenberg-Miller	DNQ
62	(United States) Milt Marion	?-Miller	
63	(United States) Frank Wearne	Miller	DNA
64	(United States) Mike Caruso	Mercedes-Ford	DNQ
64	(United States) Bob Sall	Mercedes-Ford	DNS - Caruso drove the #64 car
65	(United States) Henry Banks	Miller	
66	(United States) Gus Zarka	Ambler	
66	(United States) Chuck Tabor	Ambler	DNS - Zarka drove the #66 car
67	(United States) Roy Lake	Ambler	
68	(United States) Lem Ladd	?	DNA
73	(United States) John Moretti	?	DNA
74	(United States) Don Moore	?	DNA
?	(United States) Louis Meyer	Bugatti Type 59	DNS - crash in practice
?	(Italy) Attilio Marinoni	Alfa Romeo	DNS - drove only in practice

- DNA = Did not arrive
- DNS = Did not start
- DNQ = Did not qualify

ChampCarStats.com - 1936 George Vanderbilt Cup
The Golden Era of Grand prix Racing - I George Vanderbilt Cup Race

== Grid positions ==
Pos	1	2	3
Row 1	Brivio; 17:54.15	Winn; 18:01.77	Shaw; 18:13.92
Row 2	Connor; 18:23.22	Litz; 19:26.86	Putnam; 19:28.17
Row 3	Shafer; 20:16.09	Nuvolari; 17:09.62	Farina; 17:24.40
Row 4	Swanson; 18:05.54	Cantlon; 18:08.96	Tabor; 18:12.20
Row 5	C. Gardner; 18:27.07	Wimille; 18:28.02	Willman; 18:32.92
Row 6	"Raph"; 18:41.80	Zarka; 18:42.93	Snyder; 18:46.62
Row 7	Sommer; 18:49.10	Marion; 18:50.04	Horn; 18:50.24
Row 8	Decker; 18:53.45	Fairfield; 19:02.53	Rose; 19:04.15
Row 9	Tomei; 19:15.81	Cummings; 19:28.11	Andres; 19:34.34
Row 10	Stapp; 19:50.03	Davis; 19:50.34	McEvoy; 19:51.50
Row 11	Lake; 19:53.94	Étancelin; 19:55.97	Miller; 19:56.88
Row 12	Evans; 20:01.61	Banks; 20:05.61	Rayson; 20:06.40
Row 13	Brisko; 20:06.43	Snowberger; 20:07.93	Thorne; 20:24.88
Row 14	Chamberlain; 20:36.37	Howe; 20:35.63	Lewis; 20:46.53
Row 15	Gulotta; 20:54.31	Phillips; 21:00.13	Balus; 21:13.08

ChampCarStats.com - 1936 George Vanderbilt Cup
Vanderbilt Cup Races - Starting Lineup for the 1936 Vanderbilt Cup Race
The Golden Era of Grand Prix Racing - I George Vanderbilt Cup Race

== Race results ==
Twelve of the forty-five drivers that started the race were Europeans driving an English ERA, a French Bugatti or an Italian Alfa Romeo or Maserati. The rest of the field was made up of Americans in dirt track cars with two-speed gearboxes. Although the course contained only one long straight, and the European drivers had to get used to the loose dirt track surface, the Americans were no contest for the Grand Prix cars. For example, even with Nuvolari's V12 Alfa Romeo running on eleven cylinders, he won by eight minutes on Wimille. The best American driver was Cummings finishing seventh almost twenty-five minutes behind the winner.

Pos.	Driver	Car Constructor	Time (Status)
1	Nuvolari	Alfa Romeo	4:32:44.0
2	Wimille	Bugatti	4:40:55.9
3	Brivio	Alfa Romeo	4:45:44.4
4	Sommer	Alfa Romeo	4:46:59.51
5	Fairfield	ERA	4:56:48.5
6	McEvoy	Maserati	4:57:24.8
7	Cummings	Miller	4:57:43.11
8	Rose	Miller	4:57:47.2
9	Étancelin	Maserati	4:59:43.11
10	Litz	Miller	5:01:05.82
11	Tabor	Duesenberg	5:04:06.6
12	Andres	Stevens	5:05:54.9
13	Howe	ERA	5:06:11.75
14	Evans	Bugatti	5:07:42.5
15	Lewis	ERA	5:08:17.27
16	Decker	Duesenburg	5:08:18.63
17	Putnam	Studebaker	+1 lap
18	Rayson	Maserati	+1 lap
19	Lake	Ambler	+2 laps
20	Banks	Miller	+3 laps
21	Gardner	Miller	+3 laps
22	Zarka	Ambler	+4 laps
23	Swanson	Miller	+4 laps
24	Gulotta	Stevens	+6 laps
25	Shafer	Miller	+6 laps
26	Miller	Rigling	+10 laps
27	Brisko	Miller	+10 laps
28	Balus	Duesenberg	+10 laps
29	Chamberlain	Duesenberg	+10 laps
30	Tomei		+10 laps
31	Connor	Weil	+3 laps (DNF - engine)
32	Winn	Miller	+11 laps (DNF - rear gear)
33	Snowberger		+14 laps (DNF - brakes)
34	Thorne		+26 laps (DNF - universal joint)
35	Stapp	Shaw	+27 laps (DNF - fuel tank)
36	Horn	Wetteroth	+30 laps (DNF - stalled)
37	Snyder	Stevens	+35 laps (DNF - rear axle gear)
38	Cantlon	Miller	+40 laps (DNF - valves)
39	Davis		+45 laps (DSQ - car towed)
40	Willman	Stevens	+54 laps (DNF - steering gear)
41	Farina	Alfa Romeo	+58 laps (DNF - steering arm)
42	"Raph"	Maserati	+66 laps (DSQ - push start)
43	Phillips	Bugatti	+67 laps (DNF - connecting rod)
44	Marion		+72 laps (DNF - clutch shaft)
45	Shaw	Shaw	+73 laps (DNF - crash)

- DNF = Did Not Finish
- DSQ = Disqualified

Sources: see Entries

== Sources ==
- ChampCarStats.com - 1936 George Vanderbilt Cup
- www.goldenera.fi - I George Vanderbilt Cup Race
- Vanderbilt Cup Races - Exclusive: Starting Lineup for the 1936 Vanderbilt Cup Race
- Vanderbilt Cup Races - Race Profile: 1936 Vanderbilt Cup Race
- Driver Database - The page of each aforementioned driver was consulted.
- Racing Sports Cars - The page of each aforementioned driver was consulted.
- YouTube - 1936 Vanderbilt Cup Race
- Vanderbilt Cup Races - 1936 Vanderbilt Cup Race: Photos from the Nassau County Division of Museum Services
- Vanderbilt Cup Races - Spectacular Aerials of Roosevelt Field and Roosevelt Raceway (1924-1938)
- www.goldenera.fi - Roosevelt Raceway, New York (USA)
