= Wetteroth =

Racing car constructor

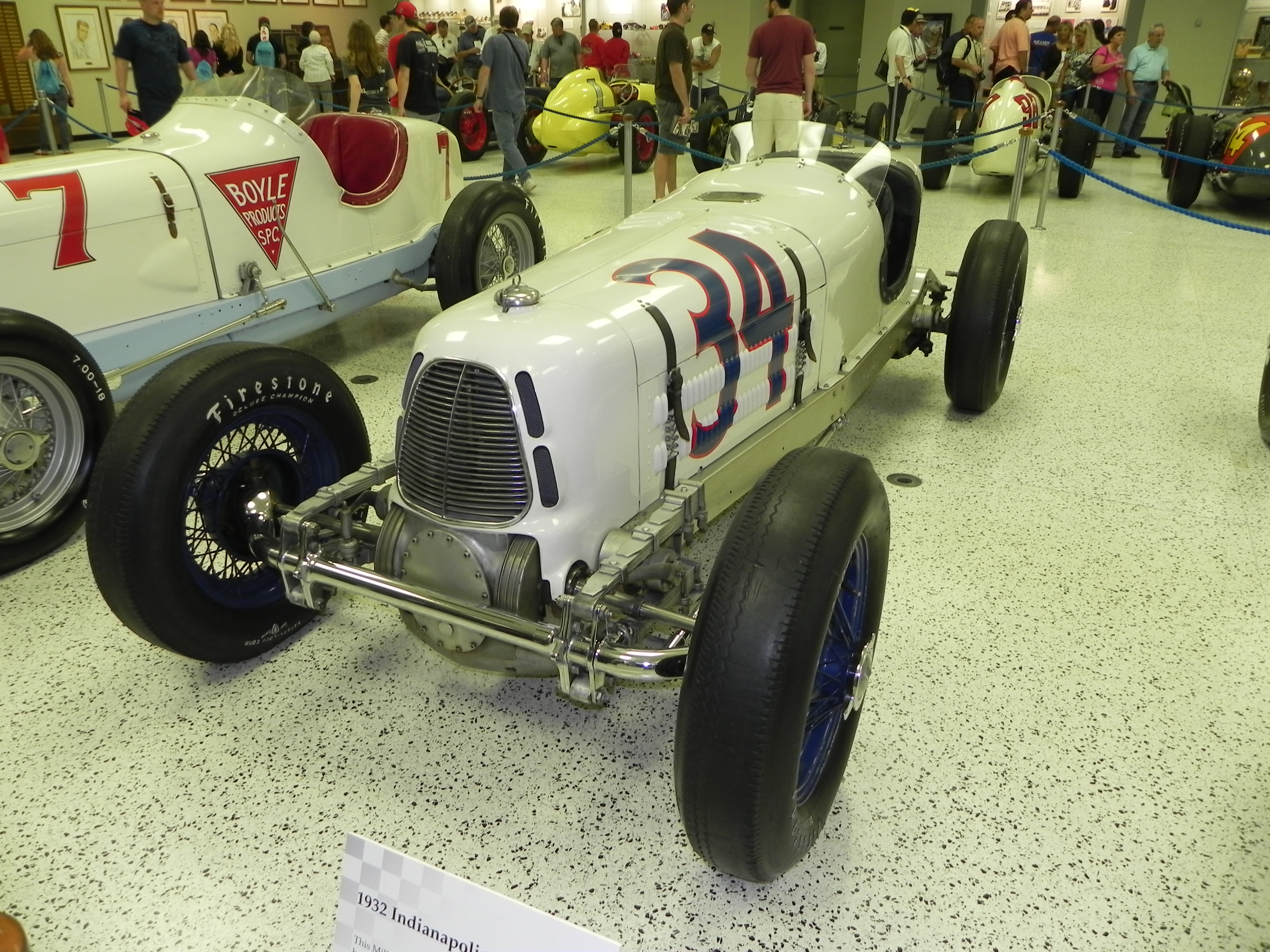
The 1932 Indianapolis 500-winning Wetteroth

Wetteroth was an American racing car constructor, owned and operated by California-based Texan Louis "Curly" Wetteroth. Wetteroth cars won four Indianapolis 500s (1932, 1935, 1938, 1941) and competed in one FIA World Championship race (1950 Indianapolis 500).

== Indianapolis 500 results ==
Season	Driver	Grid	Finish	Points	Note	Report
1932	Fred Frame	27	1	600		Report
1933	Fred Frame	3	29			Report
1935	Kelly Petillo	22	1	600	Gilmore Speedway Special	Report
1936	Ted Horn	11	2			Report
1936	Doc MacKenzie	4	3			Report
1936	Louis Tomei	8	27			Report
1937	Ted Horn	32	3			Report
1937	Ken Fowler	29	19			Report
1937	Kelly Petillo	20	20			Report
1938	Floyd Roberts	1	1	600	Burd Piston Ring Special	Report
1938	Ted Horn	6	4			Report
1938	Kelly Petillo	21	22			Report
1939	Frank Wearne	17	9			Report
1939	Herb Ardinger; Frank Brisko; Mel Hansen	9	17			Report
1939	Kelly Petillo	24	18			Report
1939	Floyd Roberts	23	23			Report
1940	Mauri Rose	3	3			Report
1940	Mel Hansen	5	8			Report
1940	Kelly Petillo	13	21			Report
1940	Cliff Bergere	6	27			Report
1941	Floyd Davis; Mauri Rose	17	1	600	Noc-Out Hose Clamp Special (shared)	Report
1941	Cliff Bergere	7	5			Report
1941	Al Putnam; Louis Durant	31	12			Report
1941	Kelly Petillo	19	27			Report
1946	Joie Chitwood; Sam Hanks	12	5			Report
1946	Billy Devore	31	10			Report
1946	Cliff Bergere; Rex Mays	1	16			Report
1947	Duke Dinsmore; Billy Devore	27	10			Report
1947	Roland Free	12	17			Report
1947	Joie Chitwood	22	22			Report
1948	Duane Carter	29	22			Report
1948	Mike Salay	31	30			Report
1949	Jim Rathmann	21	11			Report
1949	Troy Ruttman	18	12			Report
1950	Jim Rathmann	28	24			Report
1950	Bob Sweikert	DNQ				Report
