= 1939 AAA Championship Car season =

Auto racing season

- AAA National Championship Trail

Season
- Races: 3
- Start date: May 30
- End date: September 2

Awards
- National champion: (United States) Wilbur Shaw
- Indianapolis 500 winner: (United States) Wilbur Shaw

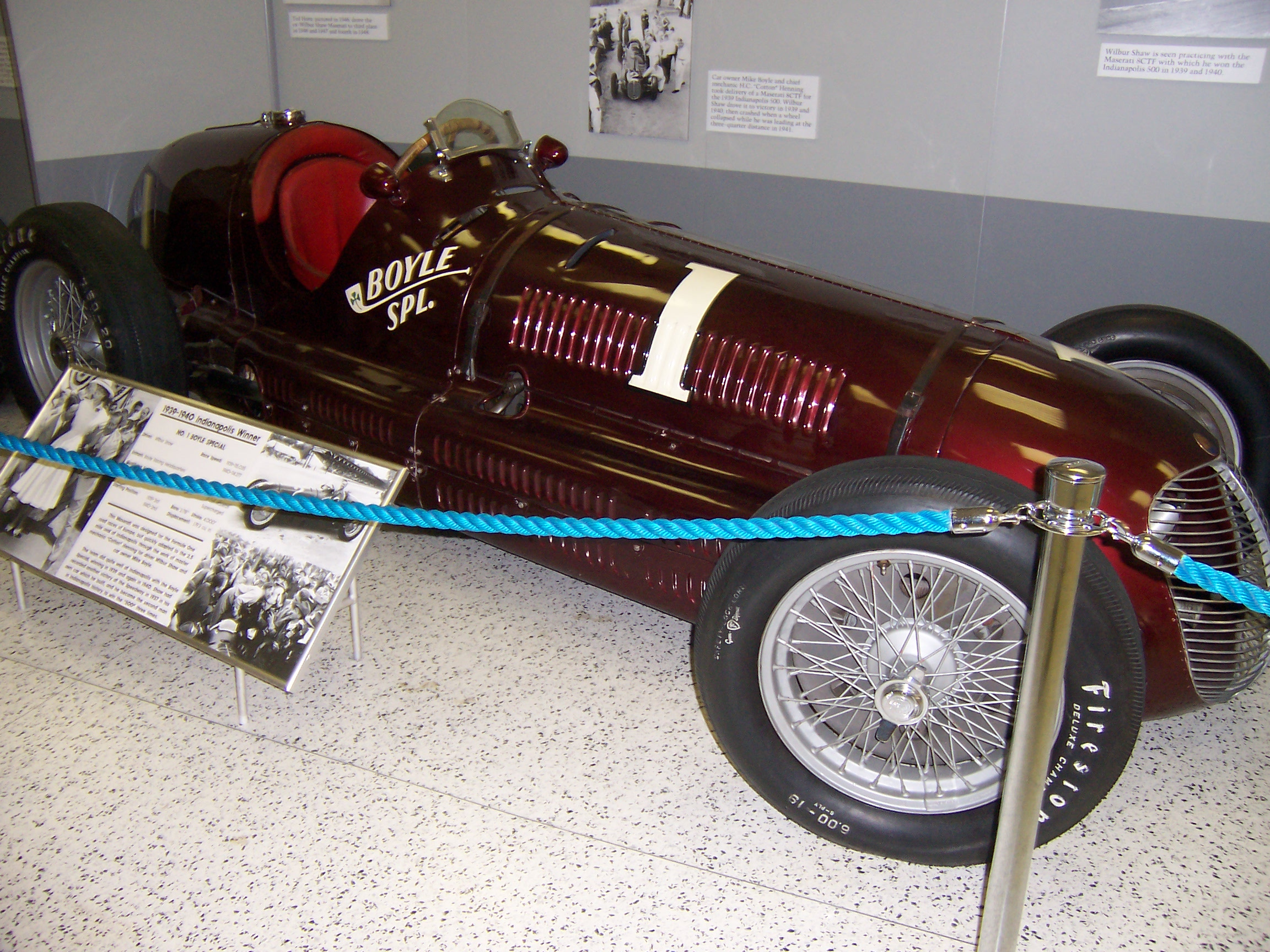

The 1939 AAA Championship Car season consisted of three races, beginning in Speedway, Indiana on May 30 and concluding in Syracuse, New York on September 2. There was also one non-championship event in Springfield, Illinois. The AAA National Champion and Indianapolis 500 winner was Wilbur Shaw.

The Springfield 100 was originally scheduled as a AAA non-championship event, had its sanction withdrawn the day of the race. It was held as an unsanctioned event on August 19, and won by John Crone.

== Schedule and results ==
All races running on Oval/Speedway.

Rnd	Date	Race name	Track	Location	Type	Pole position	Winning driver
1	May 30	(United States) International 500 Mile Sweepstakes	Indianapolis Motor Speedway	Speedway, Indiana	Paved	(United States) Jimmy Snyder	(United States) Wilbur Shaw
2	August 27	(United States) Milwaukee 100	Wisconsin State Fair Park Speedway	West Allis, Wisconsin	Dirt	(United States) Emil Andres	(United States) Babe Stapp
3	September 2	(United States) Syracuse 100	New York State Fairgrounds	Syracuse, New York	Dirt	(United States) Rex Mays	(United States) Mauri Rose
NC	October 15	(United States) Race of Champions	Illinois State Fairgrounds	Springfield, Illinois	Dirt	—	(United States) Emil Andres

Non-championship race

== Final points standings ==
Note: Drivers had to be running at the finish to score points. Points scored by drivers sharing a ride were split according to percentage of race driven. Starters were not allowed to score points as relief drivers, if a race starter finished the race in another car, in a points scoring position, those points were awarded to the driver who had started the car.
The final standings based on reference.

Pos	Driver	INDY (United States)	MIL (United States)	SYR (United States)	Pts
1	(United States) Wilbur Shaw	1			1000
2	(United States) Jimmy Snyder	**2**			825
3	(United States) Ted Horn	4	14	3	685
4	(United States) Babe Stapp	5	1	11	675
5	(United States) Cliff Bergere	3			675
6	(United States) George Barringer	6	2	5	630
7	(United States) Mauri Rose	8	12	1*	490
8	(United States) Joel Thorne	7	9	DNQ	370
9	(United States) Frank Wearne	9		DNQ	225
10	(United States) George Connor	13	10*	2	200
11	(United States) Louis Durant RY		3	7	200
12	(United States) Billy Devore	10		DNQ	136.5
13	(United States) Floyd Davis	27	11	4	135
14	(United States) Frank Brisko	29	8	6	130
15	(United States) George Robson	21	5	10	125
16	(United States) Tony Gulotta	11			114.5
17	(United States) Russ Snowberger	25	4	DNQ	110
18	(United States) Duke Nalon	DNQ	6	12	90
19	(United States) Louis Meyer	12*			75
20	(United States) Spider Webb R		7		65
21	(United States) Shorty Cantlon	32	15	8	55
22	(United States) Emil Andres	30	**13**	9	45
23	(United States) Henry Banks	10			38.5
-	(United States) Rex Mays	16	17	**13**	0
-	(United States) Frank McGurk	DNQ	16	14	0
-	(United States) Tony Willman	14			0
-	(United States) Louis Tomei	15			0
-	(United States) Herb Ardinger	17			0
-	(United States) Kelly Petillo	18		DNQ	0
-	(United States) Mel Hansen R	19			0
-	(United States) Chet Miller	20			0
-	(United States) Al Putnam	21		DNQ	0
-	(United States) Harry McQuinn	21			0
-	(United States) Ralph Hepburn	22			0
-	(United States) Floyd Roberts	23			0
-	(United States) Ira Hall	24			0
-	(United States) George Bailey	26			0
-	(United States) Al Miller	28			0
-	(United States) Bob Swanson	31			0
-	(United States) Deacon Litz	33		DNQ	0
-	(United States) Ronney Householder	DNS			0
-	(United States) Lou Webb	DNQ		DNQ	0
-	(United States) Sam Hanks	Wth		DNQ	0
-	(United States) Tommy Hinnershitz	DNQ			0
-	(United States) Zeke Meyer	DNQ			0
-	(United States) Johnny Seymour	DNQ			0
-	(United States) Doc Williams	DNQ			0
-	(United States) Vince Conze			DNQ	0
-	(United States) Lou Moore			DNQ	0
Pos	Driver	INDY (United States)	MIL (United States)	SYR (United States)	Pts

Color	Result
Gold	Winner
Silver	2nd place
Bronze	3rd place
Green	4th & 5th place
Light Blue	6th-10th place
Dark Blue	Finished (Outside Top 10)
Purple	Did not finish (Ret)
Red	Did not qualify (DNQ)
Brown	Withdrawn (Wth)
Black	Disqualified (DSQ)
White	Did not start (DNS)
Blank	Did not participate (DNP)
Blank	Not competing

**In-line notation**
**Bold**	Pole position
Italics	Ran fastest race lap
*	Led most race laps
Rookie of the Year
Rookie

== See also ==
- 1939 Indianapolis 500
