= 1937 Indianapolis 500 =

American motor race

25th Indianapolis 500
Indianapolis Motor Speedway

Indianapolis 500
- Sanctioning body: AAA
- Date: May 31, 1937
- Winner: Wilbur Shaw
- Winning Riding Mechanic: Jigger Johnson
- Winning Entrant: Shaw-Gilmore
- Winning time: 4:24:07.80
- Average speed: 113.580 mph
- Pole position: Bill Cummings
- Pole speed: 123.343 mph
- Most laps led: Wilbur Shaw (131)

Pre-race
- Pace car: LaSalle Series 50
- Pace car driver: Ralph DePalma
- Starter: Seth Klein
- Honorary referee: William S. Knudsen
- Estimated attendance: 170,000

Chronology
Previous	Next
1936	1938

The 25th International 500-Mile Sweepstakes was an Indy 500 race held at the Indianapolis Motor Speedway on Monday, May 31, 1937. It was notable for the high temperature at the circuit, reaching 92 °F (33 °C).

The race was won by Wilbur Shaw in the first of his three "500" victories, despite his car suffering from an oil leak in the final laps. Aware of Shaw's mechanical failure second place Ralph Hepburn began closing dramatically. Shaw held off Hepburn at the checkered flag by 2.16 seconds, the closest finish in Indy history until that point, a record that would stand until 1982.

== Time trials ==
Qualifying took place over ten-laps (25 mile runs).

=== Crashes ===
On May 28, the car of Overton Phillips burst into flames when his crankshaft broke and punctured the gas tank. He then crashed into the pit area, killing spectator George Warford of Indianapolis. Both Phillips and his riding mechanic, Walter King were injured, as was Anthony Caccia (the brother of Joe Caccia, who died during practice for the 1931 race), and Otto Rohde of Toledo, Ohio, a crew member for Champion Spark Plug. Rohde succumbed to his injuries on June 1, 1937.

On the same day, having completed four of ten scheduled qualifying laps, Frank McGurk's car plunged through an inner rail, overturned and ejected both McGurk, who was hospitalized in serious condition but survived, and his riding mechanic, Albert Opalko, who was killed. The crash was caused by a broken connecting rod.

=== Jimmy Snyder's track record ===
During practice, Jimmy Snyder and his riding mechanic Takeo "Chickie" Hirashima ran laps faster than the existing track record. During time trials on May 22, Snyder set the single-lap track record of 130.492 mph. His second lap (129.422 mph) and third lap (127.334 mph) dropped off and the rest of his required ten-lap run was waved off by officials due to sunset. Snyder returned on May 23 and finished his run at 125.287 mph, the fastest qualifier in the field. He would line up 19th on race day.

=== Qualifying results ===
Qualifying Results
Date	Driver	Lap 1 (mph)	Lap 2 (mph)	Lap 3 (mph)	Lap 4 (mph)	Lap 5 (mph)	Lap 6 (mph)	Lap 7 (mph)	Lap 8 (mph)	Lap 9 (mph)	Lap 10 (mph)	Average Speed (mph)
Sat 5/15/1937	Bill Cummings	123.677	123.779	120.016	122.951	123.626	123.830	123.848	123.305	123.389	125.139*	123.455

* Bill Cummings' tenth lap of 125.139 mph was a one-lap Speedway track record at the time.

== Starting grid ==
Row	Inside		Middle		Outside	
1	16	(United States) Bill Cummings W	6	(United States) Wilbur Shaw	54	(United States) Herb Ardinger
2	10	(United States) Billy Winn	2	(United States) Louis Meyer W	8	(United States) Ralph Hepburn
3	38	(United States) Tony Gulotta	1	(United States) Mauri Rose	31	(United States) Chet Gardner
4	23	(United States) Ronney Householder R	35	(United States) Deacon Litz	17	(United States) George Connor
5	7	(United States) Chet Miller	28	(United States) Billy Devore R	24	(United States) Frank Brisko
6	45	(United States) Cliff Bergere	62	(United States) Floyd Roberts	53	(United States) Louis Tomei
7	5	(United States) Jimmy Snyder	25	(United States) Kelly Petillo W	33	(United States) Bob Swanson R
8	47	(United States) Harry McQuinn	14	(United States) Rex Mays	32	(United States) Floyd Davis R
9	34	(United States) Shorty Cantlon	42	(United States) Al Miller	26	(United States) Tony Willman R
10	43	(United States) George Bailey	41	(United States) Ken Fowler R	12	(United States) Russ Snowberger
11	15	(United States) Babe Stapp	3	(United States) Ted Horn	44	(United States) Frank Wearne R

R Indianapolis 500 rookie
W Indianapolis 500 winner

=== Alternates ===
- First alternate: Emil Andres (part of an elaborate scheme caught by AAA officials, see below)
- Second alternate: Joel Thorne R — Thorne purchased the entry of the first alternate, and planned to buy the qualified car of Cliff Bergere. He then planned to withdraw both of those cars in order to elevate his own car (the second alternate) into the starting field. After the officials heard word of the solicitations, they forced him to stop the effort of effectively "buying his way in" to the field, and threatened suspension.

=== Failed to qualify ===
- Henry Banks R (#49)
- Tom Cosman R (#63)
- Dave Evans (#21)
- Ira Hall (#37, #56)
- Luther Johnson (#66)
- Milt Marion R (#65)
- Frank McGurk (#39)
- Zeke Meyer (#52)
- Duke Nalon R (#21)
- Lee Oldfield R (#72)
- Vern Ornduff R (#67)
- Overton Phillips R (#66)
- Al Putnam R (#46)
- Johnny Seymour (#51)
- Lou Webb R (#58)
- Doc Williams (#57)
- Woody Woodford R (#61)
- Ray Yeagar R (#61)

== Race ==
For 1937, riding mechanics were required. Jigger Johnson served as Wilbur Shaw's riding mechanic. Johnson, who also rode with 1931 winner Louis Schneider, became the second two-time Indianapolis 500 winning riding mechanic. Johnson would be the final winning riding mechanic in Indy history as starting in the 1938 Indianapolis 500, riding mechanics were made optional, and would no longer be utilized in the race by any entrants.

After being banned for several years, superchargers were once again permitted. Jimmy Snyder's powerful supercharged Sparks engine, allowed him to move up through the field rapidly from 19th to 6th by the end of the first lap, and first from laps four to 24. However, on lap 27 he was forced to retire by a transmission failure. Snyder later drove relief stints for both Herb Ardinger and Tony Gulotta, the latter of whom finished in eighth place.

Late in the race, Wilbur Shaw held a comfortable lead, and had lapped second place Ralph Hepburn. However, with around twenty laps remaining, Shaw's car began leaking oil which burned both Shaw and his riding mechanic Johnson. Shaw slowed down to nurse his car to the finish line and protect the rear right tire which was by this stage heavily worn. Hepburn realised Shaw was struggling and pushed to unlap himself. On the final lap Hepburn pulled to within a few seconds, and by the last turn he was directly behind Shaw. However, having reached the finish line without mechanical failure, Shaw floored the accelerator and pulled away down the final straight. He held off Hepburn for the win by 2.16 seconds, the closest Indy 500 finish to that point, a record that stood until 1982.

== Box score ==
Finish	Start	No	Name	Entrant	Chassis	Engine	Qual	Rank	Laps	Status
1	2	6	(United States) Wilbur Shaw	W. Wilbur Shaw	Shaw	Offenhauser	122.791	4	200	113.580 mph
2	6	8	(United States) Ralph Hepburn (Bob Swanson Laps 108–162)	Louis Meyer	Stevens	Offenhauser	118.809	15	200	+2.16
3	32	3	(United States) Ted Horn	Harry Hartz	Wetteroth	Miller	118.608	17	200	+21.07
4	5	2	(United States) Louis Meyer W	H. C. Henning	Miller	Miller	119.619	12	200	+6:47.90
5	16	45	(United States) Cliff Bergere (George Barringer Laps 106–156)	George C. Lyons	Stevens	Offenhauser	117.546	24	200	+11:15.80
6	1	16	(United States) Bill Cummings W (Chet Miller Laps 134–141)	H. C. Henning	Miller	Offenhauser	123.343	3	200	+15:55.23
7	14	28	(United States) Billy Devore R (Fred Frame Laps 169–200)	H. E. Winn	Stevens	Miller	120.192	9	200	+16:15.37
8	7	38	(United States) Tony Gulotta (Jimmy Snyder Laps 121–152) (Rex Mays Laps 103–120)	Joe Lencki	Rigling	Offenhauser	118.788	16	200	+21:32.62
9	12	17	(United States) George Connor	Joe Marks	Adams	Miller	120.240	8	200	+24:48.20
10	18	53	(United States) Louis Tomei	S.S. Engineering Company	Rigling	Studebaker	116.437	32	200	+30:29.53
11	9	31	(United States) Chet Gardner (Billy Winn Laps 120–173)	Chester Gardner	Duesenberg	Offenhauser	117.342	28	199	Flagged
12	10	23	(United States) Ronney Householder R (Al Putnam Laps 50–71) (Henry Banks Laps 132–167) (Ken Fowler Laps 168–194)	Henry J. Topping Jr.	Viglioni	Miller	116.464	31	194	Flagged
13	17	62	(United States) Floyd Roberts	Joel Thorne, Inc.	Miller	Miller	116.996	30	194	Flagged
14	11	35	(United States) Deacon Litz (Harry McQuinn Laps 59–71)	A. B. Litz	Miller	Miller	116.372	33	191	Out of oil
15	24	32	(United States) Floyd Davis R	Joel Thorne, Inc.	Snowberger	Miller	118.942	14	190	Crash T3
16	25	34	(United States) Shorty Cantlon (Rex Mays Laps 34–89)	Bill White Race Cars, Inc.	Weil	Miller	118.555	18	182	Flagged
17	26	42	(United States) Al Miller (Emil Andres Laps 79–158) (Mauri Rose Laps 159–170)	Joel Thorne, Inc.	Snowberger	Miller	118.518	20	170	Carburetor
18	8	1	(United States) Mauri Rose	Lou Moore	Miller	Offenhauser	118.540	19	127	Oil line
19	29	41	(United States) Ken Fowler R	E. M. "Lucky" Teeter	Wetteroth	McDowell	117.421	26	116	Pushed
20	20	25	(United States) Kelly Petillo W	Kelly Petillo	Wetteroth	Offenhauser	124.129	2	109	Out of oil
21	28	43	(United States) George Bailey	Sims & Duray	Stevens	Miller	117.497	25	107	Clutch
22	3	54	(United States) Herb Ardinger (Jimmy Snyder Laps 71–106)	Lewis W. Welch	Welch	Offenhauser	121.983	5	106	Rod
23	15	24	(United States) Frank Brisko	Frank Brisko	Stevens	Brisko	118.213	23	105	No oil pressure
24	33	44	(United States) Frank Wearne R	Leon Duray	Stevens	Miller	118.220	22	99	Carburetor
25	27	26	(United States) Tony Willman R	Pete DePaolo	Miller	Miller	118.241	21	95	Rod
26	4	10	(United States) Billy Winn	James M. Winn	Miller	Miller	119.922	11	85	Oil line
27	30	12	(United States) Russ Snowberger (Johnny Seymour Laps 52–60)	Russ Snowberger	Snowberger	Packard	117.354	27	66	Clutch
28	21	33	(United States) Bob Swanson R	Paul Weirick	Adams	Sparks	121.920	6	52	Carburetor
29	22	47	(United States) Harry McQuinn	Thomas O'Brien	Stevens	Miller	121.822	7	47	Piston
30	13	7	(United States) Chet Miller	H. C. Henning	Summers	Miller	119.213	13	36	Ignition
31	31	15	(United States) Babe Stapp	Henry J. Topping Jr.	Maserati	Maserati	117.226	29	36	Clutch
32	19	5	(United States) Jimmy Snyder	Joel Thorne, Inc.	Adams	Sparks	125.287	1	27	Transmission
33	23	14	(United States) Rex Mays	Bill White Race Cars, Inc.	Alfa Romeo	Alfa Romeo	119.968	10	24	Overheating

Note: Relief drivers in parentheses

W Former Indianapolis 500 winner

R Indianapolis 500 Rookie

=== Race statistics ===
Lap Leaders
Laps	Leader
1–2	Herb Ardinger
3–26	Jimmy Snyder
27–74	Wilbur Shaw
75–83	Ralph Hepburn
84–129	Wilbur Shaw
130–163	Bob Swanson (in relief of Hepburn)
164–200	Wilbur Shaw

Total laps led
Driver	Laps
Wilbur Shaw	131
Bob Swanson	34
Jimmy Snyder	24
Ralph Hepburn	9
Herb Ardinger	2

Yellow Lights
Laps	Reason
Extra time	Floyd Davis crash in turn 3

== Notes ==
=== Works cited ===
- Floyd Clymer's 1909–1941 Indianapolis 500 Race History
- Indianapolis 500 Chronicle

=== References ===
1936 Indianapolis 500; Louis Meyer	1937 Indianapolis 500; Wilbur Shaw	1938 Indianapolis 500; Floyd Roberts
Preceded by 109.069 mph (1936 Indianapolis 500)	Record for the fastest average speed 113.580 mph	Succeeded by 117.200 mph (1938 Indianapolis 500)
