= 1902 in motorsport =

The following is an overview of the events of 1902 in motorsport including the major racing events, motorsport venues that were opened and closed during a year, championships and non-championship events that were established and disestablished in a year, and births and deaths of racing drivers and other motorsport people.

== Births ==
| Date | Month | Name | Nationality | Occupation | Note | Ref |
|---|---|---|---|---|---|---|
| 31 | October | Wilbur Shaw | American | Racing driver | Indianapolis 500 winner (1937, 1939, 1940). | |
