= 1939 Indianapolis 500 =

American motor race

27th Indianapolis 500
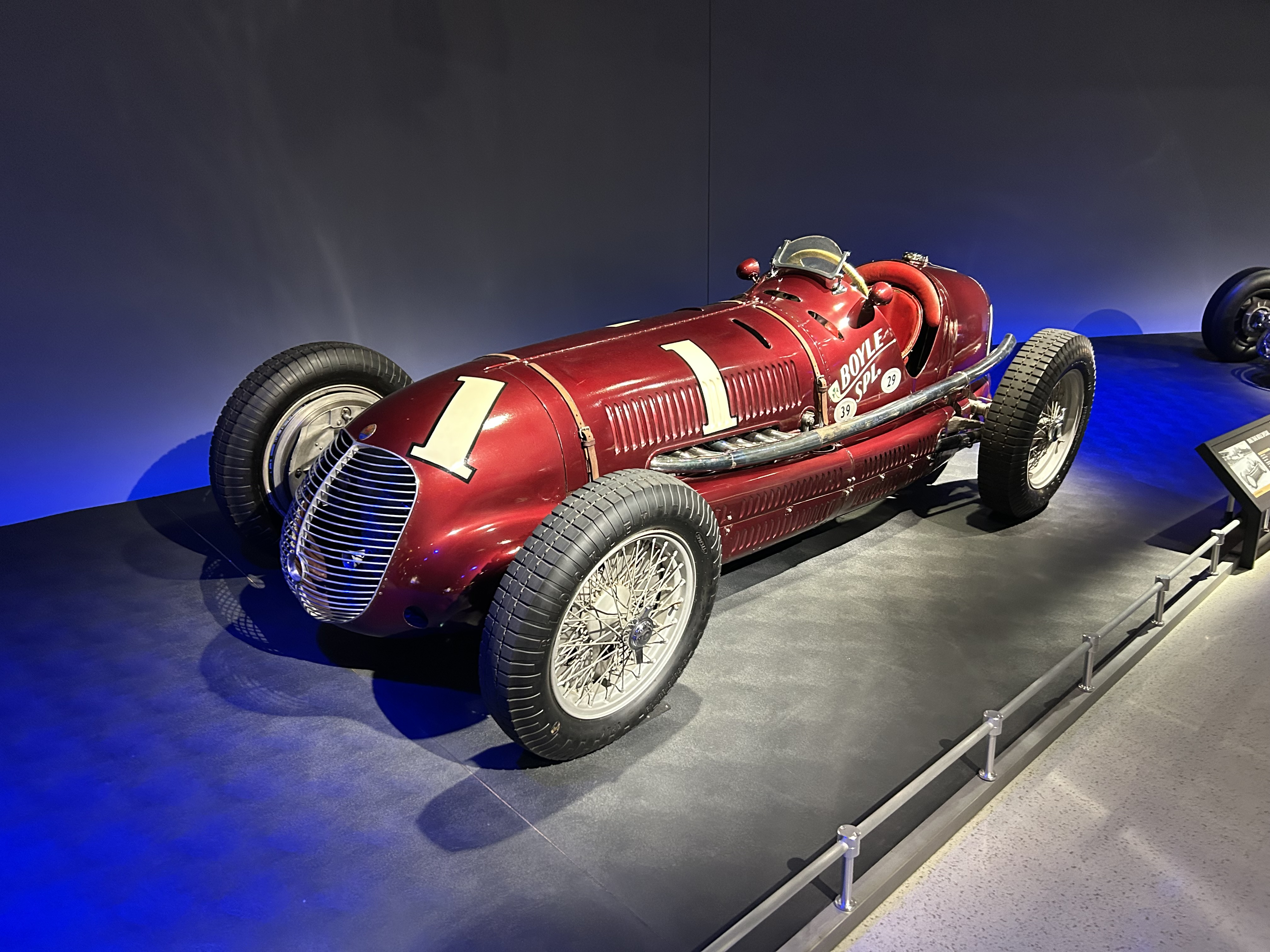

Indianapolis Motor Speedway

Indianapolis 500
- Sanctioning body: AAA
- Date: May 30, 1939
- Winner: Wilbur Shaw
- Winning Entrant: Boyle Racing Headquarters
- Winning Chief Mechanic: Robert T. Jackson
- Winning time: 4:20:47.49
- Average speed: 115.035 mph (185.131 km/h)
- Pole position: Jimmy Snyder
- Pole speed: 130.138 mph (209.437 km/h)
- Most laps led: Louis Meyer (79)

Pre-race
- Pace car: Buick Roadmaster 80
- Pace car driver: Charles Chayne
- Starter: Seth Klein
- Honorary referee: Paul G. Hoffman
- Estimated attendance: 145,000

Chronology
Previous	Next
1938	1940

The 27th International 500-Mile Sweepstakes Race was held at the Indianapolis Motor Speedway on May 30, 1939. The race was won by the number two car of Wilbur Shaw, who started in the third position, driving a Maserati 8CTF. The race was notable for a three car accident on lap 109, when Floyd Roberts, the reigning champion, was killed when his car went through the wooden outer wall at over 100 miles (160 km) an hour at the backstretch. In Louis Meyer's final Indy 500, he too would crash at the backstretch at over 100 miles (160 km) an hour, but he walked away unharmed.

== Time trials ==
Ten-lap qualifying runs were eliminated for 1939, and the distance reverted to four-lap (10 mile) runs. This change was made permanent, and four-lap runs have been used ever since.

== Starting grid ==
Row	Inside		Middle		Outside	
1	10	(United States) Jimmy Snyder	45	(United States) Louis Meyer W	2	(United States) Wilbur Shaw W
2	4	(United States) Ted Horn	3	(United States) Chet Miller	17	(United States) George Bailey
3	47	(United States) Shorty Cantlon	16	(United States) Mauri Rose	9	(United States) Herb Ardinger
4	54	(United States) Cliff Bergere	29	(United States) Frank Brisko	18	(United States) George Connor
5	25	(United States) Ralph Hepburn	49	(United States) Mel Hansen R	41	(United States) George Barringer
6	31	(United States) Babe Stapp	14	(United States) Frank Wearne	37	(United States) Ira Hall
7	15	(United States) Rex Mays	8	(United States) Joel Thorne	44	(United States) Emil Andres
8	32	(United States) Bob Swanson	1	(United States) Floyd Roberts W	35	(United States) Kelly Petillo W
9	21	(United States) Russ Snowberger	51	(United States) Tony Willman	62	(United States) Tony Gulotta
10	42	(United States) Al Miller	56	(United States) Floyd Davis	58	(United States) Louis Tomei
11	53	(United States) Deacon Litz	38	(United States) Harry McQuinn	26	(United States) Billy Devore

R Indianapolis 500 rookie
W Indianapolis 500 winner

=== Alternates ===
- First alternate: George Robson R

=== Failed to Qualify ===
- Henry Banks (#39)
- Sam Hanks R (#42)
- Tommy Hinnershitz R (#33)
- Ronney Householder (#26)
- Frank McGurk (#41)
- Zeke Meyer (#27)
- Duke Nalon (#7)
- Johnny Seymour (#61)
- Lou Webb R (#59)
- Doc Williams (#36)

== Floyd Roberts crash ==
With Roberts on lap 109, the car driven by Bob Swanson lost control and went sideways. Roberts' car contacted Swanson's, causing Swanson's car to eject Swanson, flip over, and catch fire, while Roberts' car went through the outer wall. Attempting to avoid the accident, Chet Miller swerved into the debris field. His car flipped, and went into the inner wall. Two spectators were also injured by flying debris. The three drivers were taken to hospitals, while it took over 30 minutes to clear the burning wreck of Swanson's car from the track. Roberts death due to brain injuries was announced before the race was completed.

== First rear-engined car ==
George Bailey became the first driver to compete with a rear-engined car in the Indianapolis 500 when he contested the 1939 race in a Gulf-Miller.

== Box score ==
Finish	Start	No	Name	Entrant	Chassis	Engine	Qual	Rank	Laps	Status
1	3	2	(United States) Wilbur Shaw W	Boyle Racing Headquarters	Maserati	Maserati	128.977	4	200	115.035 mph
2	1	10	(United States) Jimmy Snyder	Joel Thorne, Inc.	Adams	Sparks	130.138	1	200	+1:48.12
3	10	54	(United States) Cliff Bergere	Lewis W. Welch	Miller-Ford	Offenhauser	123.835	15	200	+3:03.91
4	4	4	(United States) Ted Horn	Boyle Racing Headquarters	Miller	Miller	127.723	6	200	+7:21.33
5	16	31	(United States) Babe Stapp	Bill White Race Cars, Inc.	Alfa Romeo-Weil	Alfa Romeo	125.000	12	200	+8:55.19
6	15	41	(United States) George Barringer	Bill White Race Cars, Inc.	Weil	Offenhauser	120.935	28	200	+9:25.11
7	20	8	(United States) Joel Thorne	Joel Thorne, Inc.	Adams	Sparks	122.177	23	200	+10:54.55
8	8	16	(United States) Mauri Rose	W. Wilbur Shaw	Shaw	Offenhauser	124.896	13	200	+13:04.31
9	17	14	(United States) Frank Wearnes	Moore & Roberts	Wetteroth	Offenhauser	125.074	11	200	+17:29.16
10	33	26	(United States) Billy Devore (Henry Banks Laps 146–189)	Leon Duray	Weil	Duray	+26:55.88	33	200	Running
11	27	62	(United States) Tony Gulotta (Harry McQuinn Laps 111–127)	George Lyons	Stevens	Offenhauser	121.749	24	200	+27:50.52
12	2	45	(United States) Louis Meyer W	Bowes Racing, Inc.	Stevens	Winfield	130.067	2	197	Crash BS
13	12	18	(United States) George Connor	Joseph Marks	Adams	Offenhauser	123.208	19	195	Stalled
14	26	51	(United States) Tony Willman	Joe Lencki	Lencki	Lencki	122.771	21	188	Fuel pump
15	30	58	(United States) Louis Tomei (Mel Hansen Laps 161–186)	Frank T. Griswold	Alfa Romeo	Alfa Romeo	118.426	30	186	Flagged
16	19	15	(United States) Rex Mays	Thorne Engineering Corp.	Adams	Sparks	126.413	7	145	Rings
17	9	9	(United States) Herb Ardinger (Frank Brisko Laps 76–94) (Mel Hansen Laps 137–141)	Harry Hartz	Wetteroth	Miller	124.125	14	141	Clutch
18	24	35	(United States) Kelly Petillo W	Kelly Petillo	Wetteroth	Offenhauser	123.660	16	141	Pistons
19	14	49	(United States) Mel Hansen R	Joel Thorne, Inc.	Adams	Sparks	121.683	25	113	Crash Pits
20	32	38	(United States) Harry McQuinn (Al Putnam Laps 12–36) (Frank Brisko Laps 37–42) (Al Putnam Laps 43–76) (George Robson Laps 77–110)	F. Burren	Blume	Brisko	117.287	32	110	Ignition
21	5	3	(United States) Chet Miller	Boyle Racing Headquarters	Summers	Miller	126.318	8	109	Crash BS
22	13	25	(United States) Ralph Hepburn (Bob Swanson Laps 104–107)	Anthony Gulotta	Stevens	Offenhauser	122.204	22	107	Crash BS
23	23	1	(United States) Floyd Roberts W ✝	Lou Moore, Inc.	Wetteroth	Offenhauser	128.968	5	106	Crash BS
24	18	37	(United States) Ira Hall	Magnee & Nowiak	Nowiak	Studebaker	121.188	27	89	Head gasket
25	25	21	(United States) Russ Snowberger	Russell Snowberger	Snowberger	Miller	123.199	20	50	Radiator
26	6	17	(United States) George Bailey	Harry A. Miller	Miller	Miller	125.821	9	47	Valve
27	29	56	(United States) Floyd Davis	Ed Walsh	Miller	Offenhauser	119.375	29	43	Shock absorber
28	28	42	(United States) Al Miller	Paul Weirick	Adams	Offenhauser	123.233	18	41	Accelerator
29	11	29	(United States) Frank Brisko	Frank Brisko	Stevens	Brisko	123.351	17	38	Air pump
30	21	44	(United States) Emil Andres	Jimmy Snyder	Stevens	Offenhauser	121.212	26	22	Spark plugs
31	22	32	(United States) Bob Swanson	Sampson Motors, Inc.	Stevens	Sampson	129.431	3	19	Rear axle
32	7	47	(United States) Shorty Cantlon	Assoc. Enterprises, Ltd.	Stevens	Offenhauser	125.567	10	15	Main bearing
33	31	53	(United States) Deacon Litz	Richard T. Wharton	Maserati	Maserati	117.979	31	7	Valve

Note: Relief drivers in parentheses

W Former Indianapolis 500 winner

R Indianapolis 500 Rookie

All entrants utilized Firestone tires.

=== Race statistics ===
Lap Leaders
Laps	Leader
1–36	Jimmy Snyder
37–69	Wilbur Shaw
70–73	Louis Meyer
74	Rex Mays
75–103	Jimmy Snyder
104–130	Louis Meyer
131–134	Ted Horn
135–182	Louis Meyer
183–200	Wilbur Shaw

Total laps led
Driver	Laps
Louis Meyer	79
Jimmy Snyder	65
Wilbur Shaw	51
Ted Horn	4
Rex Mays	1

Yellow Lights
Laps*	Reason
106–125	Floyd Roberts crash on backstretch (31:30)
* – Approximate lap counts

== See also ==
- 1939 AAA Championship Car season

1938 Indianapolis 500; Floyd Roberts	1939 Indianapolis 500; Wilbur Shaw	1940 Indianapolis 500; Wilbur Shaw
