= 1900 in motorsport =

The following is an overview of the events of 1900 in motorsport including the major racing events, motorsport venues that were opened and closed during a year, championships and non-championship events that were established and disestablished in a year, and births and deaths of racing drivers and other motorsport people.

== Births ==
Date	Month	Name	Nationality	Occupation	Note	Ref
12	February	Floyd Roberts	American	Racing driver	Indianapolis 500 winner (1938).	
1	May	Ray Keech	American	Racing driver	Indianapolis 500 winner (1929).	
11	September	George Souders	American	Racing driver	Indianapolis 500 winner (1927).	
