= 1936 AAA Championship Car season =

Auto racing season

- AAA National Championship Trail

Season
- Races: 4
- Start date: May 30
- End date: October 12

Awards
- National champion: (United States) Mauri Rose
- Indianapolis 500 winner: (United States) Louis Meyer

The 1936 AAA Championship Car season consisted of four races, beginning in Speedway, Indiana on May 30 and concluding in Westbury, New York on October 12. There were three non-championship events. The AAA National Champion was Mauri Rose, and the Indianapolis 500 winner was Louis Meyer.

Al Gordon and his driving mechanic Spider Matlock died at Ascot during the non-championship race.

== Schedule and results ==
| Rnd | Date | Race name | Track | Location | Type | Pole position | Winning driver |
|---|---|---|---|---|---|---|---|
| NC | January 12 | (United States) Oakland 150 | Oakland Speedway | San Leandro, California | Dirt | (United States) Babe Stapp | (United States) Al Gordon |
| NC | January 26 | (United States) Ascot 125 | Legion Ascot Speedway | Alhambra, California | Dirt | — | (United States) Rex Mays |
| 1 | May 30 | (United States) International 500 Mile Sweepstakes | Indianapolis Motor Speedway | Speedway, Indiana | Brick | (United States) Rex Mays | (United States) Louis Meyer |
| 2 | June 20 | (United States) Goshen 100 | Good Time Park | Goshen, New York | Dirt | (United States) George Connor | (United States) Rex Mays |
| NC | August 22 | (United States) Springfield 100 | Illinois State Fairgrounds | Springfield, Illinois | Dirt | (United States) George Connor | (United States) Wilbur Shaw |
| 3 | September 15 | (United States) Syracuse 100 | New York State Fairgrounds | Syracuse, New York | Dirt | (United States) Russ Snowberger | (United States) Mauri Rose |
| 4 | October 12 | (United States) George Vanderbilt Cup | Roosevelt Raceway | Westbury, New York | Road | (Italy) Antonio Brivio | (Italy) Tazio Nuvolari |

Dirt/Brick Oval
Road Course/Hill Climb
Non-championship race

== Final points standings ==
Note: Drivers had to be running at the finish to score points. Points scored by drivers sharing a ride were split according to percentage of race driven. Starters were not allowed to score points as relief drivers, if a race starter finished the race in another car, in a points scoring position, those points were awarded to the driver who had started the car.
The final standings based on reference.

| Pos | Driver | INDY (United States) | GOS (United States) | SYR (United States) | ROR (United States) | Pts |
|---|---|---|---|---|---|---|
| 1 | (United States) Mauri Rose | 4 | 6 | 1 | 8 | 610 |
| 2 | (United States) Louis Meyer | 1* | 13 | | DNQ | 600 |
| 3 | (United States) Ted Horn | 2 | DNQ | DNQ | 36 | 450 |
| 4 | (United States) Doc MacKenzie | 3 | 3 | | | 362 |
| 5 | (Kingdom of Italy) Tazio Nuvolari RY | | | | 1* | 360 |
| 6 | (United States) Wilbur Shaw | 7 | 2 | 12 | 45 | 319.8 |
| 7 | (United States) Chet Miller | 5 | DNQ | | 26 | 300 |
| 8 | (France) Jean-Pierre Wimille R | | | | 2 | 270 |
| 9 | (Kingdom of Italy) Antonio Brivio R | | | | **3** | 240 |
| 10 | (France) Raymond Sommer R | | | | 4 | 210 |
| 11 | (United States) Rex Mays | **15** | 1 | 3* | DNQ | 200 |
| 12 | (United States) Ray Pixley R | 6 | | | | 200 |
| 13 | (United Kingdom) Pat Fairfield R | | | | 5 | 180 |
| 14 | (United States) George Barringer | 8 | | | | 150 |
| 15 | (United States) George Connor | 10 | **14** | 2 | 31 | 140 |
| 16 | (United States) Bill Cummings | 33 | 11 | 13 | 7 | 120 |
| 17 | (United States) Kelly Petillo | 3 | | | | 118 |
| 18 | (United States) Jimmy Snyder | 30 | 7 | 4 | 37 | 110 |
| 19 | (Kingdom of Italy) Carlo Felice Trossi R | | | | 6 | 102 |
| 20 | (United States) Zeke Meyer | 9 | | | DNS | 100 |
| 21 | (United States) Frank Brisko | 20 | 9 | 5 | 27 | 80 |
| 22 | (United States) Floyd Roberts | 19 | 4 | | | 70 |
| 23 | (United States) Billy Winn | 26 | 5* | 9 | 32 | 60 |
| 24 | (France) Philippe Étancelin R | | | | 9 | 60 |
| 25 | (United States) Bob Sall | | | 6 | DNS | 50 |
| 26 | (Australia) Frederick McEvoy R | | | | 6 | 48 |
| 27 | (United States) Chet Gardner | 29 | 8 | 14 | 21 | 30 |
| 28 | (United States) Deacon Litz | 23 | | 15 | 10 | 30 |
| 29 | (United States) Shorty Cantlon | 14 | DNQ | 7 | 38 | 10.2 |
| 30 | (United States) Babe Stapp | 24 | 10 | | 35 | 10 |
| - | (United States) Russ Snowberger | DNQ | 12 | **8** | 33 | 0 |
| - | (United States) Floyd Davis | | DNQ | 10 | 39 | 0 |
| - | (United States) Henry Banks | DNQ | | 11 | 20 | 0 |
| - | (United States) Freddie Winnai | 11 | DNQ | | DNP | 0 |
| - | (United States) Chuck Tabor R | | DNQ | | 11 | 0 |
| - | (United States) Emil Andres | 18 | | | 12 | 0 |
| - | (United States) Ralph Hepburn | 12 | | | | 0 |
| - | (United States) Harry McQuinn | 13 | | | | 0 |
| - | (United Kingdom) Francis Curzon R | | | | 13 | 0 |
| - | (United States) Dave Evans | DNQ | | | 14 | 0 |
| - | (United Kingdom) Brian Lewis R | | | | 15 | 0 |
| - | (United States) Rick Decker | DNQ | | | 16 | 0 |
| - | (United States) Doc Williams R | 16 | | | | 0 |
| - | (United States) Lou Moore | 17 | DNQ | | | 0 |
| - | (United States) Al Putnam R | DNQ | | | 17 | 0 |
| - | (United Kingdom) Teddy Rayson R | | | | 18 | 0 |
| - | (United States) Roy Lake R | | | | 19 | 0 |
| - | (United States) Al Miller | 21 | | | | 0 |
| - | (United States) Tony Gulotta | 22 | | | 24 | 0 |
| - | (United States) Cliff Bergere | 22 | | | | 0 |
| - | (United States) Gus Zarka R | | | | 22 | 0 |
| - | (United States) Bob Swanson R | | | | 23 | 0 |
| - | (United States) Phil Shafer | DNQ | | | 25 | 0 |
| - | (United States) Frank McGurk R | 26 | | | DNQ | 0 |
| - | (United States) Louis Tomei | 27 | DNQ | DNQ | 30 | 0 |
| - | (United States) Herb Ardinger | 28 | | | | 0 |
| - | (United States) Lewis Balus R | | | | 28 | 0 |
| - | (United States) Ted Chamberlain | | | | 29 | 0 |
| - | (United States) Johnny Seymour | 31 | | DNS | | 0 |
| - | (United States) Fred Frame | 32 | | | | 0 |
| - | (United States) Joel Thorne R | DNP | DNQ | DNS | 34 | 0 |
| - | (United States) Tony Willman R | | | | 40 | 0 |
| - | (Kingdom of Italy) Giuseppe Farina R | | | | 41 | 0 |
| - | (France) Raphaël Bethenod R | | | | 42 | 0 |
| - | (United States) Overton Phillips R | | | | 43 | 0 |
| - | (United States) Milt Marion | | DNQ | DNQ | 44 | 0 |
| - | (United States) George Wingerter | DNQ | DNQ | DNQ | DNS | 0 |
| - | (United States) John Crow | | | DNS | | 0 |
| - | (United States) Louis Kimmer | | | DNS | | 0 |
| - | (United States) Frankie Beeder | | | | DNS | 0 |
| - | (United States) Ben Brandfon | | | | DNS | 0 |
| - | (Australia) Sidney Cotton | | | | DNS | 0 |
| - | (United States) Billy Devore | | | | DNS | 0 |
| - | (United Kingdom) Goldie Gardner | | | | DNS | 0 |
| - | (Kingdom of Italy) Attilio Marinoni | | | | DNS | 0 |
| - | (United States) Ray Carter | | DNQ | DSQ | | 0 |
| - | (United States) George Bailey | DNQ | | | | 0 |
| - | (United States) Dusty Fahrnow | DNQ | | | | 0 |
| - | (United States) Harry Hunt | DNQ | | | | 0 |
| - | (United States) Roy Painter | DNQ | | | | 0 |
| - | (United States) Overton Snell | DNQ | | | | 0 |
| - | (United States) Walt Brown | | DNQ | | | 0 |
| - | (United States) Jack Moon | | DNQ | | | 0 |
| - | (United States) Bill Schindler | | DNQ | | | 0 |
| - | (United States) Gene Pirong | | | DNQ | | 0 |
| - | (United States) Bob Zauer | | | DNQ | | 0 |
| - | (United States) Mike Caruso | | | | DNQ | 0 |
| - | (United States) John Cebula | | | | DNQ | 0 |
| - | (United States) Luther Johnson | Wth | | | | 0 |
| - | (United States) Lucky Teter | DNP | | | | 0 |
| - | (United States) Lemuel Ladd | | | | DNP | 0 |
| - | (United States) Don Moore | | | | DNP | 0 |
| - | (United States) John Moretti | | | | DNP | 0 |
| - | (United States) Frank Wearne | | | | DNP | 0 |
| - | (United States) Don Durfer | | | DSQ | | 0 |
| - | (United States) Charles Tramison | | | DSQ | | 0 |
| Pos | Driver | INDY (United States) | GOS (United States) | SYR (United States) | ROR (United States) | Pts |

| Color | Result |
|---|---|
| Gold | Winner |
| Silver | 2nd place |
| Bronze | 3rd place |
| Green | 4th & 5th place |
| Light Blue | 6th-10th place |
| Dark Blue | Finished (Outside Top 10) |
| Purple | Did not finish (Ret) |
| Red | Did not qualify (DNQ) |
| Brown | Withdrawn (Wth) |
| Black | Disqualified (DSQ) |
| White | Did not start (DNS) |
| Blank | Did not participate (DNP) |
| Blank | Not competing |

**In-line notation**
| **Bold** | Pole position |
| Italics | Ran fastest race lap |
| * | Led most race laps |
Rookie of the Year
Rookie

== See also ==
- 1936 Indianapolis 500
