= Emil Andres =

American racing driver (1911–1999)

- Born: Emil William Andres; February 22, 1911 Tinley Park, Illinois, U.S.
- Died: July 20, 1999 (aged 88) South Holland, Illinois, U.S.

Championship titles
- AAA Midwest Big Car (1940)

Champ Car career
- 51+ races run over 12 years
- Best finish: 3rd (1946)
- First race: 1935 Springfield 100 (Springfield)
- Last race: 1950 Rex Mays Classic (Milwaukee)
- First win: 1948 Milwaukee 100 (Milwaukee)
| Wins | Podiums | Poles |
|---|---|---|
| 1 | 13 | 5 |

Formula One World Championship career
- Active years: 1950
- Team: Kurtis Kraft
- Entries: 1 (0 starts)
- Championships: 0
- Wins: 0
- Podiums: 0
- Career points: 0
- Pole positions: 0
- Fastest laps: 0
- First entry: 1950 Indianapolis 500

Emil William Andres (February 22, 1911 – July 20, 1999) was an American racing driver active during the 1930s and 1940s.

== Racing career ==
Andres was part of the midget car racing "Chicago Gang," along with Tony Bettenhausen, Cowboy O'Rourke, Paul Russo, Jimmy Snyder, and Wally Zale. These racers toured tracks in the Midwest and East Coast of the United States.

=== World Drivers' Championship career ===
The AAA/USAC-sanctioned Indianapolis 500 was included in the FIA World Drivers' Championship from 1950 through 1960. Drivers competing at Indianapolis during those years were credited with World Drivers' Championship participation, and were eligible to score WDC points alongside those which they may have scored towards the AAA/USAC National Championship.

Andres attempted to qualify for one World Drivers' Championship race at Indianapolis, failing to make the 1950 race.

== Awards and honors ==
Andres was inducted in the National Sprint Car Hall of Fame in 1996. In 2013, he was inducted in the National Midget Auto Racing Hall of Fame.

== Racing record ==
=== Complete AAA Championship Car results ===
(key) (Races in bold indicate pole position)

| Year | Team | 1 | 2 | 3 | 4 | 5 | 6 | 7 | 8 | 9 | 10 | 11 | 12 | 13 | 14 | Pos | Points | Ref |
|---|---|---|---|---|---|---|---|---|---|---|---|---|---|---|---|---|---|---|
| 1935 | | INDY; DNQ | HAM; DNQ | | | | | | | | | | | | | 17th | 80 | |
| 1935 | Michel de Baets | | | SPR; 3 | SYR | ALT | LAN | | | | | | | | | 17th | 80 | |
| 1936 | Stewart Carew | INDY; 18 | GOS | SYR | | | | | | | | | | | | NC | 0 | |
| 1936 | Joe Lencki | | | | ROR; 12 | | | | | | | | | | | NC | 0 | |
| 1937 | | INDY; DNQ | ROR | | | | | | | | | | | | | NC | 0 | |
| 1937 | Burd Piston Ring | | | SYR; DNQ | | | | | | | | | | | | NC | 0 | |
| 1938 | Elgin Piston Pin | INDY; 29 | SYR | | | | | | | | | | | | | NC | 0 | |
| 1939 | Jimmy Snyder | INDY; 30 | **MIL**; 13 | SYR; 9 | | | | | | | | | | | | 22nd | 45 | |
| 1940 | Murrell Belanger | INDY; 12 | | | | | | | | | | | | | | 17th | 110 | |
| 1940 | Bill White | | SPR; DNS | SYR; 10 | | | | | | | | | | | | 17th | 110 | |
| 1941 | Joe Lencki | INDY; 30 | | | | | | | | | | | | | | 18th | 90 | |
| 1941 | George Lyons | | MIL; 5 | SYR; 13 | | | | | | | | | | | | 18th | 90 | |
| 1946 | Frank Brisko | INDY; 4 | | | | | | | | | | | | | | 2nd | 1260 | |
| 1946 | Emil Andres | | LAN; 4 | ATL; 3 | ISF; 3 | MIL; 3 | **GOS**; 4 | | | | | | | | | 2nd | 1260 | |
| 1947 | Joe Lencki | INDY; 13 | MIL; 8 | | | | | | | | | | | | | 8th | 575 | |
| 1947 | Emil Andres | | | **LAN**; 2 | | | | | | | | | | | | 8th | 575 | |
| 1947 | Murrell Belanger | | | | ATL; 13 | | MIL; 17 | **GOS**; 15 | MIL; 5 | PIK | **SPR**; 10 | ARL; 3 | | | | 8th | 575 | |
| 1947 | Larry Jewell | | | | | BAI; 7 | | | | | | | | | | 8th | 575 | |
| 1948 | Tuffanelli | ARL | INDY; 31 | MIL; 1 | | | | | | | | | | | | 9th | 810 | |
| 1948 | Charlie Pritchard | | | | LAN; 3 | MIL; 2 | SPR; 18 | MIL; 16 | | | | SPR; 2 | DUQ; 13 | | | 9th | 810 | |
| 1948 | Bill Corley | | | | | | | | DUQ; 8 | ATL; 5 | PIK | | | | | 9th | 810 | |
| 1949 | Charles Pritchard | ARL | INDY; 9 | | | | | | | | | | | | | 10th | 512 | |
| 1949 | Carmine Tuffanelli | | | MIL; 2 | TRE; 4 | SPR | | | | | | | | | | 10th | 512 | |
| 1949 | Milt Marion | | | | | | MIL; 5 | | | | | | | | | 10th | 512 | |
| 1949 | William Schoof | | | | | | | DUQ; 13 | PIK | | | | | | | 10th | 512 | |
| 1949 | Lou Moore | | | | | | | | | SYR; 10 | DET | | | | | 10th | 512 | |
| 1949 | Paul Weirick | | | | | | | | | | | SPR; DNQ | LAN | SAC | DMR | 10th | 512 | |
| 1950 | Murrell Belanger | INDY; DNQ | | | | | | | | | | | | | | NC | 0 | |
| 1950 | Ross Page | | MIL; 16 | LAN | SPR | MIL | PIK | SYR | DET | SPR | SAC | PHX | BAY | DAR | | NC | 0 | |

=== Indianapolis 500 results ===
| Year | Car | Start | Qual | Rank | Finish | Laps | Led | Retired |
|---|---|---|---|---|---|---|---|---|
| 1936 | 19 | 33 | 111.455 | 31 | 18 | 184 | 0 | Flagged |
| 1938 | 42 | 28 | 117.126 | 27 | 29 | 45 | 0 | Crash T2 |
| 1939 | 44 | 21 | 121.212 | 26 | 30 | 22 | 0 | Spark plugs |
| 1940 | 25 | 22 | 122.963 | 14 | 12 | 192 | 0 | Flagged |
| 1941 | 19 | 15 | 122.266 | 19 | 30 | 5 | 0 | Crash T1 |
| 1946 | 18 | 11 | 121.139 | 20 | 4 | 200 | 0 | Running |
| 1947 | 3 | 30 | 116.781 | 29 | 13 | 150 | 0 | Magneto |
| 1948 | 8 | 16 | 123.550 | 23 | 31 | 11 | 0 | Steering |
| 1949 | 9 | 32 | 126.042 | 31 | 9 | 197 | 0 | Flagged |
| **Totals** | | | | | | 1006 | 0 | |

| Starts | 9 |
| Poles | 0 |
| Front Row | 0 |
| Wins | 0 |
| Top 5 | 1 |
| Top 10 | 2 |
| Retired | 5 |

=== Complete FIA World Drivers' Championship results ===
(key)

| Year | Entrant | Chassis | Engine | 1 | 2 | 3 | 4 | 5 | 6 | 7 | WDC | Points |
|---|---|---|---|---|---|---|---|---|---|---|---|---|
| 1950 | Murrell Belanger | Kurtis Kraft | Offenhauser L4 | GBR | MON | 500; DNQ | SUI | BEL | FRA | ITA | NC | 0 |
