= 1940 Indianapolis 500 =

American motor race

28th Indianapolis 500
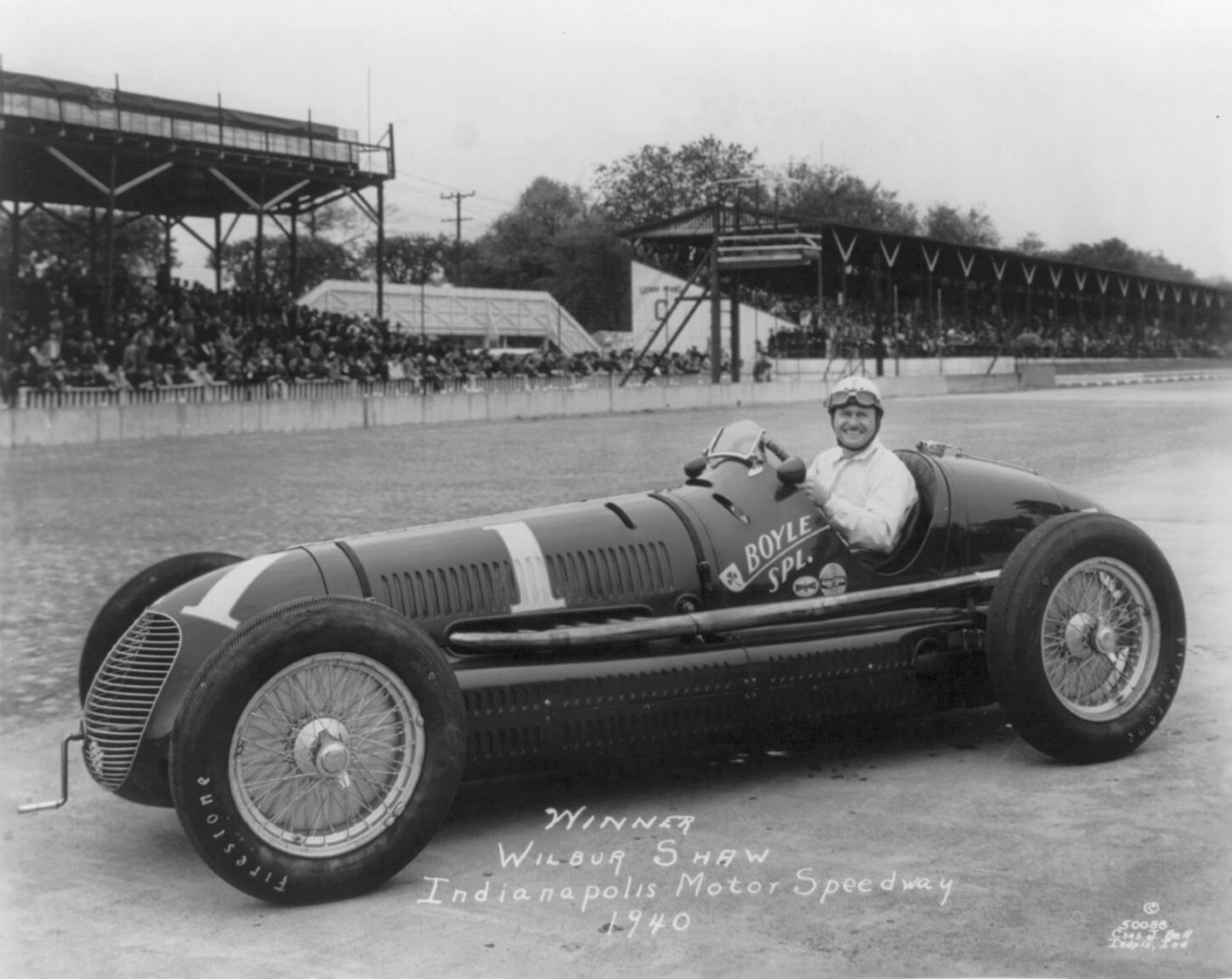

Indianapolis Motor Speedway

Indianapolis 500
- Sanctioning body: AAA
- Date: May 30, 1940
- Winner: Wilbur Shaw
- Winning Entrant: Boyle Racing Headquarters
- Winning Chief Mechanic: Harry C. "Cotton" Henning
- Winning time: 4:22:31.17
- Average speed: 114.277 mph
- Pole position: Rex Mays
- Pole speed: 127.850 mph
- Most laps led: Wilbur Shaw (136)

Pre-race
- Pace car: Studebaker Champion
- Pace car driver: Ab Jenkins
- Starter: Seth Klein
- Honorary referee: Roscoe Turner
- Estimated attendance: 150,000

Chronology
Previous	Next
1939	1941

The 28th International 500-Mile Sweepstakes Race was held at the Indianapolis Motor Speedway on May 30, 1940. The winner was Wilbur Shaw in the same Maserati 8CTF he had driven to victory in 1939. Shaw became the first driver in the history of the race to win in consecutive years. It also marked Shaw's third win in four years, making him the second three-time winner of the race. Shaw's average speed was 114.277 mph, slowed by rain which caused the last 50 laps to be run under caution. Shaw took home $31,875 (equivalent to $732,519 in 2025) in prize winnings, plus additional prizes that included a car and a refrigerator.

The first three finishers – Shaw, Rex Mays, and Mauri Rose – were allowed to finish the race. Fourth place finisher Ted Horn, however, was flagged due to the rain shower. Though it appears he may have actually completed all 200 laps, officials ceased scoring Horn (as well as all other cars) immediately after third place Rose crossed the finish line. Horn was officially credited with completing 199 laps – one lap short of the full distance. This marked the only blemish on his noteworthy record of nine consecutive races completing every lap. He eventually completed 1,799 out of a possible 1,800 laps from 1936 to 1948.

The top four starting positions finished in the top four places, albeit in shuffled order.

== Starting grid ==
Row	Inside		Middle		Outside	
1	33	(United States) Rex Mays	1	(United States) Wilbur Shaw W	7	(United States) Mauri Rose
2	3	(United States) Ted Horn	31	(United States) Mel Hansen	5	(United States) Cliff Bergere
3	9	(United States) Frank Wearne	16	(United States) Frank Brisko	27	(United States) Tommy Hinnershitz R
4	8	(United States) Joel Thorne	19	(United States) Russ Snowberger	24	(United States) Babe Stapp
5	35	(United States) Kelly Petillo W	28	(United States) Sam Hanks R	41	(United States) Harry McQuinn
6	6	(United States) George Barringer	10	(United States) George Connor	26	(United States) Louis Tomei
7	36	(United States) Doc Williams	32	(United States) Bob Swanson	54	(United States) Ralph Hepburn
8	25	(United States) Emil Andres	17	(United States) George Robson R	29	(Argentina) Raúl Riganti
9	21	(United States) Duke Nalon	42	(United States) Joie Chitwood R	34	(United States) Chet Miller
10	44	(United States) Al Putnam	38	(United States) Paul Russo R	58	(United States) Al Miller
11	49	(France) René Le Bègue R	14	(United States) Billy Devore	61	(United States) Floyd Davis

R Indianapolis 500 rookie
W Indianapolis 500 winner

=== Alternates ===
- First alternate: Tony Willman

=== Failed to qualify ===
- George Bailey (#56) - Fatal accident
- Henry Banks (#39)
- Shorty Cantlon (#24) - Replaced by Babe Stapp
- Wesley Crawford (#62)
- Port DeFraties R (#51)
- René Dreyfus R (#22) - drove two stints of relief for René Le Bègue during the race
- Louis Durant R (#12)
- Ira Hall (#47)
- Bill Lipscomb R (#57)
- Louis Unser R - Passed driver's test
- Lou Webb R (#37)
- Freddie Winnai (#59)

== Box score ==
Finish	Start	No	Name	Chassis	Engine	Qual	Rank	Laps	Status
1	2	1	(United States) Wilbur Shaw W	Maserati	Maserati	127.065	2	200	114.277 mph
2	1	33	(United States) Rex Mays	Stevens	Winfield	127.850	1	200	+1:14.14
3	3	7	(United States) Mauri Rose	Wetteroth	Offenhauser	125.624	3	200	+1:37.79
4	4	3	(United States) Ted Horn	Miller	Miller	125.545	4	199	Flagged
5	10	8	(United States) Joel Thorne	Adams	Sparks	122.434	20	197	Flagged
6	20	32	(United States) Bob Swanson	Stevens	Sampson	124.882	6	196	Flagged
7	7	9	(United States) Frank Wearne	Stevens	Offenhauser	123.216	12	195	Flagged
8	5	31	(United States) Mel Hansen	Wetteroth	Miller	124.753	7	194	Flagged
9	8	16	(United States) Frank Brisko	Stevens	Brisko	122.716	16	193	Flagged
10	31	49	(France) René Le Bègue R (Laps 1–45 and 98–150) (France) René Dreyfus (Laps 46–97 and 151–192)	Maserati	Maserati	118.981	33	192	Flagged
11	15	41	(United States) Harry McQuinn	A-R Weil	Alfa Romeo	122.486	19	192	Flagged
12	22	25	(United States) Emil Andres	Stevens	Offenhauser	122.963	15	192	Flagged
13	14	28	(United States) Sam Hanks R	Weil	Duray	123.064	13	192	Flagged
14	16	6	(United States) George Barringer	Weil	Offenhauser	121.889	22	191	Flagged
15	26	42	(United States) Joie Chitwood R	Adams	Offenhauser	121.757	25	190	Flagged
16	18	26	(United States) Louis Tomei	Miller	Offenhauser	119.980	32	190	Exhaust pipe
17	27	34	(United States) Chet Miller (Henry Banks Laps 148–189)	Alfa Romeo	Alfa Romeo	121.392	27	189	Flagged
18	32	14	(United States) Billy Devore (George Connor Laps 107–181)	Shaw	Offenhauser	122.197	21	181	Flagged
19	28	44	(United States) Al Putnam	Adams	Offenhauser	120.818	28	179	Flagged
20	33	61	(United States) Floyd Davis (Lou Webb Laps 27–57) (George Connor Laps 58–59) (Lou Webb Laps 60–157)	Lencki	Lencki	120.797	30	157	Flagged
21	13	35	(United States) Kelly Petillo W	Wetteroth	Offenhauser	125.331	5	128	Bearing
22	25	21	(United States) Duke Nalon	Silnes	Offenhauser	121.790	24	120	Rod
23	23	17	(United States) George Robson R	Miller	Offenhauser	122.562	18	67	Shock absorber
24	12	24	(United States) Babe Stapp (Started in substitution for Shorty Cantlon) (Tony Willman Lap 13–64)	Stevens	Offenhauser	123.367	11	64	Oil line
25	19	36	(United States) Doc Williams	Cooper	Miller	122.963	14	61	Oil line
26	17	10	(United States) George Connor	Lencki	Lencki	124.585	8	52	Rod
27	6	5	(United States) Cliff Bergere	Wetteroth	Offenhauser	123.673	10	51	Oil line
28	29	38	(United States) Paul Russo R	Blume	Brisko	120.809	29	48	Oil leak
29	21	54	(United States) Ralph Hepburn	Miller	Offenhauser	123.860	9	47	Steering
30	30	58	(United States) Al Miller	Alfa Romeo	Alfa Romeo	120.288	31	41	Clutch
31	11	19	(United States) Russ Snowberger	Snowberger	Miller	121.564	26	38	Water pump
32	9	27	(United States) Tommy Hinnershitz R	Adams	Offenhauser	122.614	17	32	Crash FS
33	24	29	(Argentina) Raúl Riganti	Maserati	Maserati	121.827	23	24	Crash T2

Note: Relief drivers in parentheses

W Former Indianapolis 500 winner

R Indianapolis 500 Rookie

All entrants utilized Firestone tires.

=== Race statistics ===
Lap Leaders
Laps	Leader
1–33	Rex Mays
34–73	Wilbur Shaw
74–99	Rex Mays
100–104	Mauri Rose
105–200	Wilbur Shaw

Total laps led
Driver	Laps
Wilbur Shaw	136
Rex Mays	59
Mauri Rose	5

Yellow Lights
Laps*	Reason
25	Raúl Riganti crash in turn 2
33	Tommy Hinnershitz crash on mainstretch
47	Ralph Hepburn crash on mainstretch
151–200	Rain (approx. 1 hr., 18 mins.)
* – Approximate lap counts

== See also ==
- 1940 AAA Championship Car season

1939 Indianapolis 500; Wilbur Shaw	1940 Indianapolis 500; Wilbur Shaw	1941 Indianapolis 500; Mauri Rose; Floyd Davis
