= Joel Thorne =

American racing driver (1914–1955)

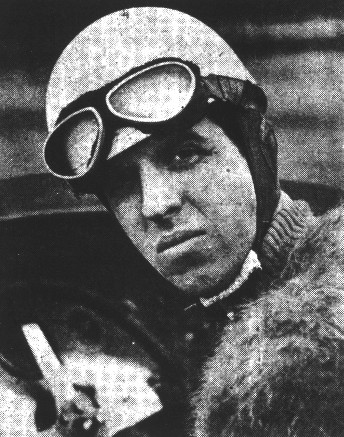
- Thorne, circa 1938
- Born: Joel Wolfe Thorne Jr. October 16, 1914 New York, New York, U.S.
- Died: October 17, 1955 (aged 41) North Hollywood, California, U.S.

Champ Car career
- 8 races run over 12 years
- Best finish: 5th (1940)
- First race: 1936 Vanderbilt Cup (Westbury)
- Last race: 1950 Pikes Peak Hill Climb (Pikes Peak)
Wins	Podiums	Poles
0	0	0

Joel Wolfe Thorne Jr. (October 16, 1914 – October 17, 1955) was an American racing driver, engineer, and playboy. Thorne raced his own cars in the Indianapolis 500, and later went on to attempt to design aircraft. He died after a plane crash in North Hollywood.

== Racing career ==
The 1946 Indianapolis 500 was won by a car owned by Thorne and driven by George Robson. One of Thorne's cars also won the pole position and finished second in the 1939 Indianapolis 500 with Jimmy Snyder behind the wheel.

== Death ==
Thorne died after crashing his private plane, during what witnesses described as "stunting", into an apartment building, killing three residents including a two-month-old baby. His net worth was reportedly $100,000 at his time of death in 1955, this equates to about $1.2 million today.

== Motorsports career results ==
=== Indianapolis 500 results ===
Year	Car	Start	Qual	Rank	Finish	Laps	Led	Retired
1938	22	13	119.155	23	9	185	0	Flagged
1939	8	20	122.177	23	7	200	0	Running
1940	8	10	122.434	20	5	197	0	Flagged
1941	5	23	121.163	24	31	5	0	Crash T1
Totals						587	0	

Starts	4
Poles	0
Front Row	0
Wins	0
Top 5	1
Top 10	3
Retired	1

== See also ==
- Frank Kurtis
