= Ted Horn =

American racing driver (1910–1948)

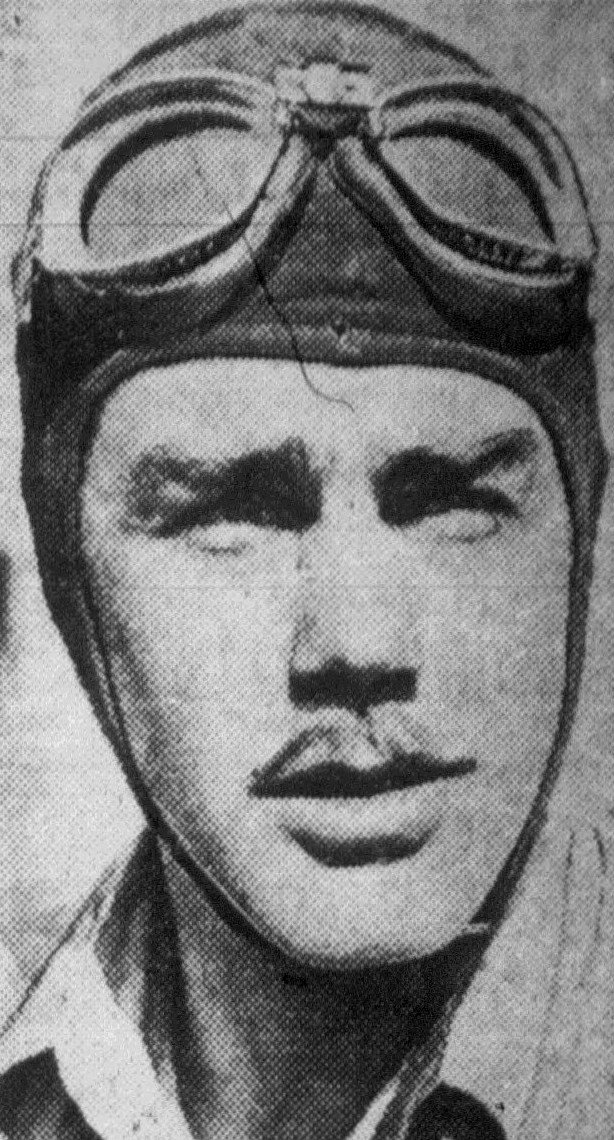
- Horn, circa 1933
- Born: Eylard Theodore Horn; February 27, 1910 Cincinnati, Ohio, U.S.
- Died: October 10, 1948 (aged 38) Du Quoin, Illinois, U.S.

Championship titles
- AAA Midwest Big Car (1938, 1939); AAA Championship Car (1946, 1947, 1948); AAA Eastern Big Car (1947, 1948)

Champ Car career
- 72+ races run over 11 years
- Best finish: 1st (1946, 1947, 1948)
- First race: 1935 Indianapolis 500 (Indianapolis)
- Last race: 1948 DuQuoin 100 #2 (DuQuoin)
- First win: 1946 Williams Grove Race #2 (Williams Grove)
- Last win: 1948 Springfield 100 (Springfield)
| Wins | Podiums | Poles |
|---|---|---|
| 24 | 49 | 7 |

Eylard Theodore Horn (February 27, 1910 – October 10, 1948) was an American racing driver. Widely considered one of the greatest racers of his era, he was the first person in history to win the AAA National Championship three times consecutively, doing so in 1946, 1947 and 1948.

== Early life and career ==
Eylard Theodore Horn was born in Cincinnati, Ohio. Horn's family moved several times during his childhood, finally settling in Los Angeles. At 15 years of age, he found work at the Los Angeles Times newspaper.

On his way to work one day Horn was pulled over for speeding. Try as he might, he could not get out of this situation easily. The policeman gave him a fairly unusual punishment for the infraction. The young man was to travel to a race track called San Jose Speedway where usually there were more cars than drivers, then find a willing car owner to let him drive. Once he got all the speed he had out of his system, he could pick up his impounded car. Horn would heed the advice of the policeman and would eventually return to pick up his car. But he found a new passion in auto racing and would never "get the speed he had out of his system."

When Horn began his racing career in earnest at a California race track called Legion Ascot Speedway, he found he had much to learn as he was usually the slowest driver on the track. Eventually a few of the drivers gave him pointers on how to pick up his lap times which started to help develop his driving style. He suffered a serious racing accident which broke his foot and burned his back and kept him on the mend for several weeks. At the urging of his parents, he promised to abandon the sport. He fully intended to abide by his parents wishes but after three years he began racing again.

Horn steadily improved to the point he finished a close second in a race to Indianapolis 500 winner Louis Meyer. Meyer was impressed with young Ted Horn, who felt he now needed to travel to the mid-western and eastern regions of the United States where there were more race tracks and opportunities for a young race driver.

== Championship car career ==
In 1934 in preparation for the Indianapolis 500, Horn practiced in a car called the Mick Special. However, he did not feel comfortable with the car and decided against trying to qualify it. Throughout that summer he campaigned a sprint car on a rigorous schedule once again in the east and midwest. He was successful enough to attract the attention of Harry Miller. Preston Tucker was putting together an ambitious effort with Miller and the Ford Motor Company for the 1935 Indianapolis 500. When asked by Miller, Horn accepted a ride in one of the new Miller Ford V8 cars. He did make the field for the 1935 Indianapolis 500. Unfortunately a flaw in the design of the car would eventually result in the steering gear in the car to eventually freeze up and the car being impossible to steer. He dropped out of the race after 145 laps, most of which was spent fighting the steering problem.

After his first Indianapolis 500, Horn felt that he failed to make an impression. Former driver turned car owner Harry Hartz felt otherwise about the young driver and thought that he did an excellent job of driving under difficult circumstances. Hartz was impressed enough to offer Horn a chance to drive his car in the 1936 Indianapolis 500, which he gladly accepted. Hartz, consistent finisher in his years driving the Indianapolis 500, took Horn under his wing. The combination Hartz and Horn was immediately a potent one as Horn would finish second on his first race with Hartz. He had two more Indianapolis 500 starts with the Hartz machine and finished third and fourth respectively.

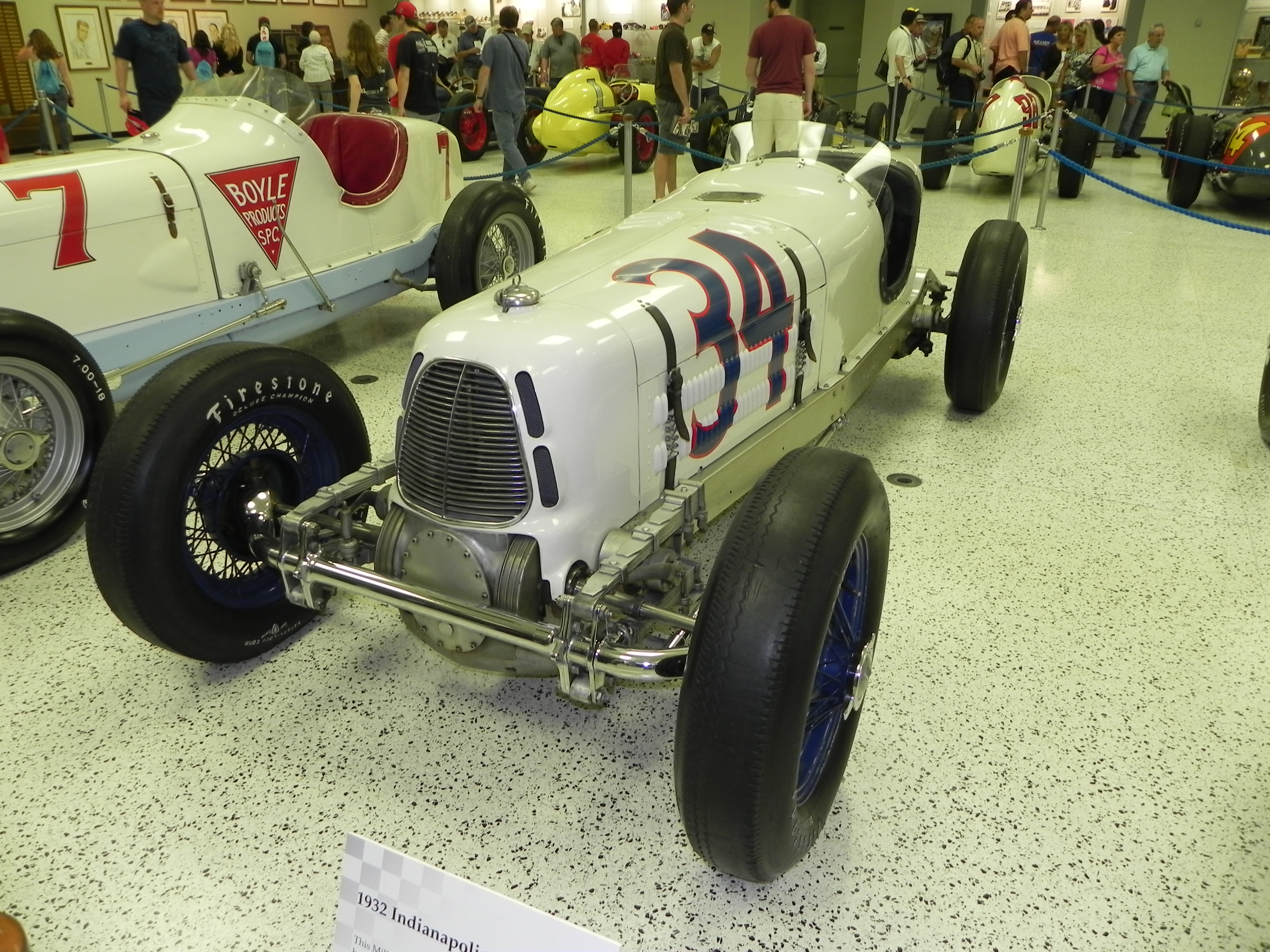
The car Horn drove to a second place finish in the 1936 Indianapolis 500 - later repainted to look as it did when Fred Frame drove the vehicle to victory in the 1932 event

Horn continued to race with moderate success through the 1930s, with second, third and fourth places at the Indianapolis 500 and placing well in the championship standings.

Horn volunteered for World War II service but was rejected on the basis of his racing injuries. After the cessation of hostilities, racing began again on a limited basis in 1945, and Horn won all seven races he entered that year. Further success came his way in the three subsequent years, giving him the National Championship in 1946, 1947 and 1948; this was the first three-time win. He never won the Indianapolis 500, but achieved nine straight top-four finishes. He also started on the pole in 1947.

== Death ==
During the season finale of the 1948 AAA Championship Car season, with Horn having already clinched his third successive championship, in Du Quoin, Illinois on October 10, 1948, he was involved in a serious accident during the second lap. He was taken to the hospital alive but died a short time later. He was 38. The Southern Illinois 100 was known as the Ted Horn Memorial from 1952 until 1983.

== Awards and honors ==
Horn has been inducted into the following halls of fame:

- Auto Racing Hall of Fame (1964)
- Eastern Motorsports Press Association Hall of Fame (1987)
- National Sprint Car Hall of Fame (1991)
- Motorsports Hall of Fame of America (1993)

== Motorsports career results ==
=== AAA Championship Car results ===
| Year | 1 | 2 | 3 | 4 | 5 | 6 | 7 | 8 | 9 | 10 | 11 | 12 | Pos | Points |
|---|---|---|---|---|---|---|---|---|---|---|---|---|---|---|
| 1934 | INDY; DNQ | SPR | SYR | MYF | | | | | | | | | NR | 0 |
| 1935 | INDY; 16 | MIN; DNQ | SPR | SYR | ALT | LAN | | | | | | | NR | 0 |
| 1936 | INDY; 2 | GTP; DNQ | SYR; DNQ | GVC; 36 | | | | | | | | | 3rd | 450 |
| 1937 | INDY; 3 | GVC; 17 | SYR; 6 | | | | | | | | | | 2nd | 750 |
| 1938 | INDY; 4 | SYR; 4 | | | | | | | | | | | 4th | 660 |
| 1939 | INDY; 4 | MIL; 14 | SYR; 3 | | | | | | | | | | 3rd | 685 |
| 1940 | INDY; 4 | ILL; 2 | SYR; 6 | | | | | | | | | | 4th | 625 |
| 1941 | INDY; 3 | MIL | SYR | | | | | | | | | | 2nd | 675 |
| 1946 | INDY; 3 | LAN; 3 | ATL; 6 | ISF; 4 | MIL; 2 | GOS; 2 | | | | | | | 1st | 2,448 |
| 1947 | INDY; 3 | MIL; DNQ | LAN; 5 | ATL; 4 | BAI; 1 | MIL; 6 | GOS; 2 | MIL; 1 | PIK | SPR; 2 | ARL; 1 | | 1st | 1,920 |
| 1948 | ARL; 1 | INDY; 4 | MIL; 3 | LAN; 9 | MIL; 3 | SPR; 1 | MIL; 3 | DUQ; 3 | ATL; 12 | PIK | SPR; 3 | DUQ; 17 | 1st | 1,890 |

- 1946 table only includes results of the six races run to "championship car" specifications. Points total includes the 71 races run to "big car" specifications.

=== Indianapolis 500 results ===
| Year | Car | Start | Qual | Rank | Finish | Laps | Led | Retired | Chassis | Engine |
|---|---|---|---|---|---|---|---|---|---|---|
| 1934 | 53 | DNQ | | | | | | | Duesenberg | Duesenberg |
| 1935 | 43 | 26 | 113.213 | 27 | 16 | 145 | 0 | Steering | Miller | Ford |
| 1936 | 22 | 11 | 116.564 | 8 | 2 | 200 | 16 | Running | Wetteroth | Miller |
| 1937 | 3 | 32 | 118.608 | 17 | 3 | 200 | 0 | Running | Wetteroth | Miller |
| 1938 | 2 | 6 | 121.327 | 12 | 4 | 200 | 0 | Running | Wetteroth | Miller |
| 1939 | 4 | 4 | 127.723 | 6 | 4 | 200 | 4 | Running | Miller | Miller |
| 1940 | 3 | 4 | 125.545 | 4 | 4 | 199 | 0 | Flagged | Miller | Miller |
| 1941 | 4 | 28 | 124.297 | 8 | 3 | 200 | 0 | Running | Adams | Sparks |
| 1946 | 29 | 7 | 123.980 | 11 | 3 | 200 | 0 | Running | Maserati | Maserati |
| 1947 | 1 | 1 | 126.564 | 3 | 3 | 200 | 0 | Running | Maserati | Maserati |
| 1948 | 1 | 5 | 126.565 | 9 | 4 | 200 | 74 | Running | Maserati | Maserati |
| Totals | | | | | | 1944 | 94 | | | |

| Starts | 10 |
| Poles | 1 |
| Front Row | 1 |
| Wins | 0 |
| Top 5 | 9 |
| Top 10 | 9 |
| Retired | 1 |

- Horn has the best 10-year streak of finishes in Indianapolis 500 history.
- Over his Indianapolis 500 career, Horn completed 1944 out of a possible 2000 laps (97%).
- Although Horn started the 1947 race from the pole position, his was the third fastest qualifying speed behind Bill Holland and Duke Nalon.
- Horn qualified for the prestigious 100 mph Club a record eight times.
