= George Bailey (racing driver) =

American racing driver (1898–1940)

- Born: George Vernon Bailey; December 3, 1898 Cleveland, Ohio, U.S.
- Died: May 7, 1940 (aged 41) Speedway, Indiana, U.S.

Champ Car career
- 7 races run over 8 years
- Best finish: 15th (tie) (1938)
- First race: 1934 Indianapolis 500 (Indianapolis)
- Last race: 1939 Indianapolis 500 (Indianapolis)
Wins	Podiums	Poles
0	0	0

George Vernon Bailey (December 3, 1898 – May 7, 1940) was an American racing driver active in the 1930s.

== Death ==
Bailey was killed in a crash during practice for the 1940 Indianapolis 500 when his gasoline tank exploded after he spun and hit a wall. Bailey died shortly after.

Bailey became the first competitor to drive a rear-engined car in the Indianapolis 500 when he contested the 1939 race in a Gulf-Miller.

== Motorsports career results ==
=== Indianapolis 500 results ===
Year	Car	Start	Qual	Rank	Finish	Laps	Led	Retired
1934	58	16	111.063	25	32	12	0	Crash T3
1935	35	29	113.432	25	26	65	0	Steering
1937	43	28	117.497	25	21	107	0	Clutch
1938	12	29	116.393	29	12	166	0	Clutch
1939	17	6	125.821	9	26	47	0	Valve
Totals						397	0	

Starts	5
Poles	0
Front Row	0
Wins	0
Top 5	0
Top 10	0
Retired	5
