= Bob Swanson =

American racing driver (1912–1940)

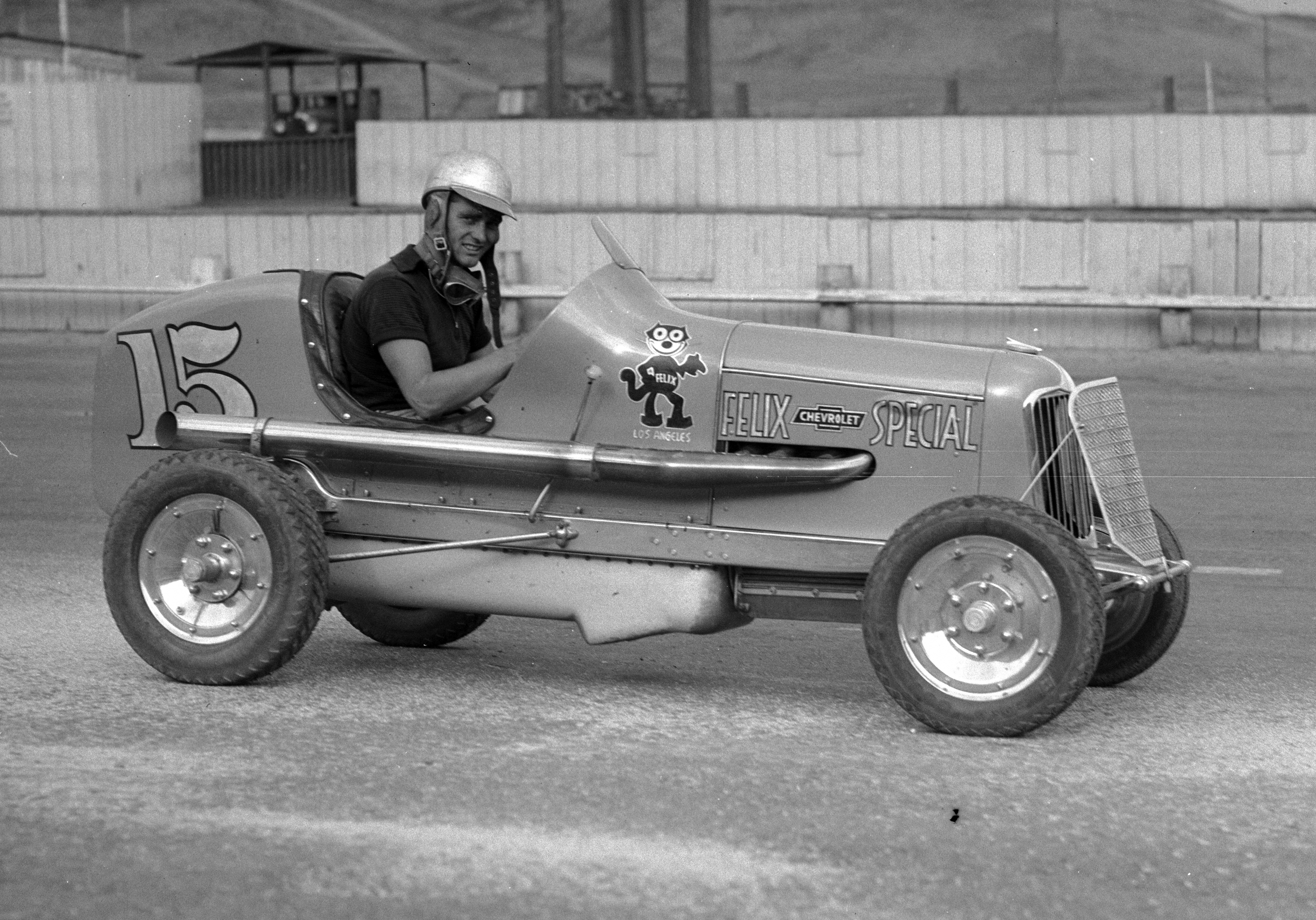
- Swanson at the Legion Ascot Speedway, 1935
- Born: Robert John Swanson; August 20, 1912 Minneapolis, Minnesota, U.S.
- Died: June 13, 1940 (aged 27) Perrysburg, Ohio, U.S.

Champ Car career
- 4 races run over 4 years
- Best finish: 6th (1940)
- First race: 1936 Vanderbilt Cup (Westbury)
- Last race: 1940 Indianapolis 500 (Indianapolis)
Wins	Podiums	Poles
0	0	0

Robert John Swanson (August 20, 1912 – June 13, 1940) was an American racing driver.

== Biography ==
Swanson won the first Turkey Night Grand Prix midget-car race in 1934. During the 1939 Indianapolis 500, he was involved in the accident that killed defending champion Floyd Roberts. Thrown out of his car when Roberts hit him, Swanson lay unconscious on the track as the car overturned and caught fire. His lucky escape proved to be only a temporary reprieve, as Swanson was killed a year later while attempting to qualify for a midget car race.

In a 2006 interview, motorsports reporter Chris Economaki called Swanson "the best racing driver he ever saw."

Swanson was inducted in the National Midget Auto Racing Hall of Fame.

== Motorsports career results ==
=== Indianapolis 500 results ===
Year	Car	Start	Qual	Rank	Finish	Laps	Led	Retired
1937	33	21	121.920	6	28	52	34	Carburetor
1939	32	22	129.431	3	31	19	0	Rear axle
1940	32	20	124.882	6	6	196	0	Flagged
Totals						267	34	

Starts	3
Poles	0
Front Row	0
Wins	0
Top 5	0
Top 10	1
Retired	2
