= 1938 Indianapolis 500 =

American motor race

26th Indianapolis 500
Indianapolis Motor Speedway

Indianapolis 500
- Sanctioning body: AAA
- Date: May 30, 1938
- Winner: Floyd Roberts
- Winning Entrant: Lou Moore
- Winning Chief Mechanic: Lou Moore
- Winning time: 4:15:58.40
- Average speed: 117.200 mph
- Pole position: Floyd Roberts
- Pole speed: 125.681 mph
- Most laps led: Floyd Roberts and Jimmy Snyder (92 laps each)

Pre-race
- Pace car: Hudson 112
- Pace car driver: Stu Baits
- Starter: Seth Klein
- Honorary referee: Harvey S. Firestone
- Estimated attendance: 150,000

Chronology
Previous	Next
1937	1939

The 26th International 500-Mile Sweepstakes Race was held at the Indianapolis Motor Speedway on Monday, May 30, 1938. For 1938, riding mechanics were made optional; however, no teams utilized them in the race. In addition, after seven years, the engine specifications were changed again. The 1930 "Junk" formula was eliminated. Normally aspirated engines were allowed 4.5 liters (down from 6.0 L), and superchargers would be permitted again, with a maximum displacement of 3.0 liters. Any fuel was allowed, which directly affected the race.

== Time trials ==
Ten-lap (25 mile) qualifying runs were utilized. This would be the final time this distance was used. Floyd Roberts won the pole position.

Qualifying Results
Date	Driver	Lap 1 (mph)	Lap 2 (mph)	Lap 3 (mph)	Lap 4 (mph)	Lap 5 (mph)	Lap 6 (mph)	Lap 7 (mph)	Lap 8 (mph)	Lap 9 (mph)	Lap 10 (mph)	Average Speed (mph)
Sat 5/21/1938	Floyd Roberts	126.174	126.743	124.138	125.839	125.857	125.122	124.688	125.523	125.892	126.886	125.506

== Starting grid ==
Row	Inside		Middle		Outside	
1	23	(United States) Floyd Roberts	14	(United States) Russ Snowberger	8	(United States) Rex Mays
2	17	(United States) Tony Gulotta	3	(United States) Chet Miller	2	(United States) Ted Horn
3	1	(United States) Wilbur Shaw W	34	(United States) Babe Stapp	27	(United States) Mauri Rose
4	16	(United States) Ronney Householder	26	(United States) Frank Brisko	5	(United States) Louis Meyer W
5	22	(United States) Joel Thorne R	54	(United States) Herb Ardinger	6	(United States) Jimmy Snyder
6	7	(United States) Bill Cummings W	29	(United States) Frank Wearne	38	(United States) Chet Gardner
7	15	(United States) George Connor	47	(United States) Shorty Cantlon	35	(United States) Kelly Petillo W
8	55	(United States) Al Miller	36	(United States) Al Putnam R	21	(United States) Louis Tomei
9	45	(United States) Harry McQuinn	10	(United States) Tony Willman	37	(United States) Ira Hall
10	42	(United States) Emil Andres	12	(United States) George Bailey	58	(United States) Billy Devore
11	33	(United States) Henry Banks R	9	(United States) Cliff Bergere	43	(United States) Duke Nalon R

R Indianapolis 500 rookie
W Indianapolis 500 winner

=== Alternates ===
- First alternate: Charlie Crawford

=== Failed to Qualify ===
- Frankie Beeder R (#45)
- Floyd Davis (#59)
- Fred Frame W (#32)
- Ralph Hepburn (#4)
- Deacon Litz (#52)
- Tazio Nuvolari R (#48, #54)
- Jack Petticord (#57)
- Johnny Sawyer (#53)
- Johnny Seymour (#56)
- Doc Williams (#46)
- Billy Winn (#18, #24)

== Race Recap ==
Floyd Roberts started in the pole position.

By 200 miles completed, Jimmy Snyder led a trio of alcohol-powered cars, followed by Roberts and Wilbur Shaw in cars running gasoline. When the alcohol cars pitted to re-fuel, Roberts took the lead for the first time. At 300 miles, Roberts made his one and only pit stop for fuel and a single tire change, and gave up the lead to Snyder. At 375 miles, Snyder made his 3rd stop for more methanol, and Roberts re-took a lead he would not relinquish to the checkered.

Roberts led 92 laps, posted an average speed of 117.200 miles per hour, and won $32,075. Roberts' car was owned by Lou Moore, who was also the chief mechanic.

For this race, only the front and back straightaways were still surfaced with the original bricks installed in 1909. All 4 turns were paved with asphalt prior to this race.

The race was run under heavily overcast skies, with rain threatening the entire day. But it did not rain until the race was completed.

The race was marred by the death of 33-year-old spectator Everett Spence. On lap 45 the number 42 car driven by Emil Andres hit the wall in turn two, then flipped over several times, causing its right front wheel to fly off. The wheel traveled 100 feet (30 m) through the air and hit Spence, who was pronounced dead upon arriving at the hospital. Andres suffered a concussion, broken nose, and chest injuries.

== Box score ==
Finish	Start	No	Name	Entrant	Chassis	Engine	Qual	Rank	Laps	Status
1	1	23	(United States) Floyd Roberts	Lou Moore	Wetteroth	Miller	125.681	2	200	117.200 mph
2	7	1	(United States) Wilbur Shaw W	W. Wilbur Shaw	Shaw	Offenhauser	120.987	13	200	+3:55.27
3	5	3	(United States) Chet Miller	Boyle Racing Headquarters	Summers	Offenhauser	121.898	9	200	+5:21.11
4	6	2	(United States) Ted Horn	Harry Hartz	Wetteroth	Miller	121.327	12	200	+11:43.99
5	18	38	(United States) Chet Gardner	Joe Lencki	Rigling	Offenhauser	120.435	17	200	+16:19.08
6	14	54	(United States) Herb Ardinger (Russ Snowberger Laps 84–92) (Cliff Bergere Laps 122–199)	Lewis W. Welch	Miller-Ford	Offenhauser	119.022	24	199	Flagged
7	25	45	(United States) Harry McQuinn (Tony Willman Laps 87–169)	Carl Marchese	Marchese	Miller	119.492	21	197	Flagged
8	30	58	(United States) Billy Devore	Joel Thorne, Inc.	Stevens	Offenhauser	116.339	30	185	Flagged
9	13	22	(United States) Joel Thorne R	Joel Thorne, Inc.	Shaw	Offenhauser	119.155	23	185	Flagged
10	17	29	(United States) Frank Wearne	Paul Weirick	Adams	Offenhauser	121.405	11	181	Flagged
11	33	43	(United States) Duke Nalon R	Henry Kohlert	Fengler	Miller	113.828	33	178	Flagged
12	29	12	(United States) George Bailey	Leon Duray	Weil	Duray	116.393	29	166	Clutch
13	9	27	(United States) Mauri Rose	Boyle Racing Headquarters	Maserati	Maserati	119.796	20	165	Supercharger
14	10	16	(United States) Ronney Householder (Billy Winn Laps 139–154)	Joel Thorne, Inc.	Adams	Sparks	125.769	1	154	Supercharger
15	15	6	(United States) Jimmy Snyder	Joel Thorne, Inc.	Adams	Sparks	123.506	4	150	Supercharger
16	12	5	(United States) Louis Meyer W	Bowes Racing, Inc.	Stevens	Winfield	120.525	16	149	Oil Pump
17	4	17	(United States) Tony Gulotta	Tony Gulotta	Stevens	Offenhauser	122.499	6	130	Rod
18	22	55	(United States) Al Miller	Jack Holly	Miller	Miller	119.420	22	125	Clutch
19	19	15	(United States) George Connor	Joseph Marks	Adams	Miller	120.326	18	119	Engine
20	32	9	(United States) Cliff Bergere	George H. Lyons	Stevens	Miller	114.464	32	111	Piston
21	31	33	(United States) Henry Banks R	Louis Kimmel	Miller	Voelker	116.279	31	109	Rod bearing
22	21	35	(United States) Kelly Petillo W	Kelly Petillo	Wetteroth	Offenhauser	119.827	19	100	Camshaft
23	24	21	(United States) Louis Tomei	H. E. Winn	Miller	Miller	121.599	10	88	Rod
24	16	7	(United States) Bill Cummings W	Boyle Racing Headquarters	Miller	Miller	122.393	7	72	Radiator
25	2	14	(United States) Russ Snowberger	Russ Snowberger	Snowberger	Miller	124.027	3	56	Rod
26	8	34	(United States) Babe Stapp	Bill White Race Cars, Inc.	Weil	Miller	120.595	15	54	Valve
27	26	10	(United States) Tony Willman	Murrell Belanger	Stevens	Miller	118.458	25	47	Valve
28	3	8	(United States) Rex Mays	Bill White Race Cars, Inc.	Alfa Romeo-Weil	Alfa Romeo	122.845	5	45	Supercharger
29	28	42	(United States) Emil Andres	Elgin Piston Pin Company	Adams	Brisko	117.126	27	45	Crash T2
30	27	37	(United States) Ira Hall	Nowiak & Magnee	Nowiak	Studebaker	118.255	26	44	Crash T3
31	11	26	(United States) Frank Brisko	Frank Brisko	Stevens	Brisko	121.921	8	39	Oil line
32	23	36	(United States) Al Putnam R	Arthur M. Sims	Stevens	Miller	116.791	28	15	Crankshaft
33	20	47	(United States) Shorty Cantlon	Thomas O'Brien	Stevens	Miller	120.906	14	13	Supercharger

Note: Relief drivers in parentheses

W Former Indianapolis 500 winner

R Indianapolis 500 Rookie

=== Race statistics ===
Lap Leaders
Laps	Leader
1–14	Rex Mays
15–31	Jimmy Snyder
32–33	Rex Mays
34–74	Jimmy Snyder
75–110	Floyd Roberts
111–114	Jimmy Snyder
115–200	Floyd Roberts

Total laps led
Driver	Laps
Floyd Roberts	92
Jimmy Snyder	92
Rex Mays	16

Yellow Lights
Laps	Reason
Extra time	Rain; race ended (see below).

- After the 5th-place car finished 200 laps, rain brought out the yellow flag. Moments later, rain started to fall harder, and the red flag was put out ending the race. All cars still on the track were flagged off.

== See also ==
- 1938 AAA Championship Car season

1937 Indianapolis 500; Wilbur Shaw	1938 Indianapolis 500; Floyd Roberts	1939 Indianapolis 500; Wilbur Shaw
Preceded by 113.580 mph (1937 Indianapolis 500)	Record for the fastest average speed 117.200 mph	Succeeded by 119.814 mph (1948 Indianapolis 500)
