= Floyd Roberts =

American racing driver (1900–1939)

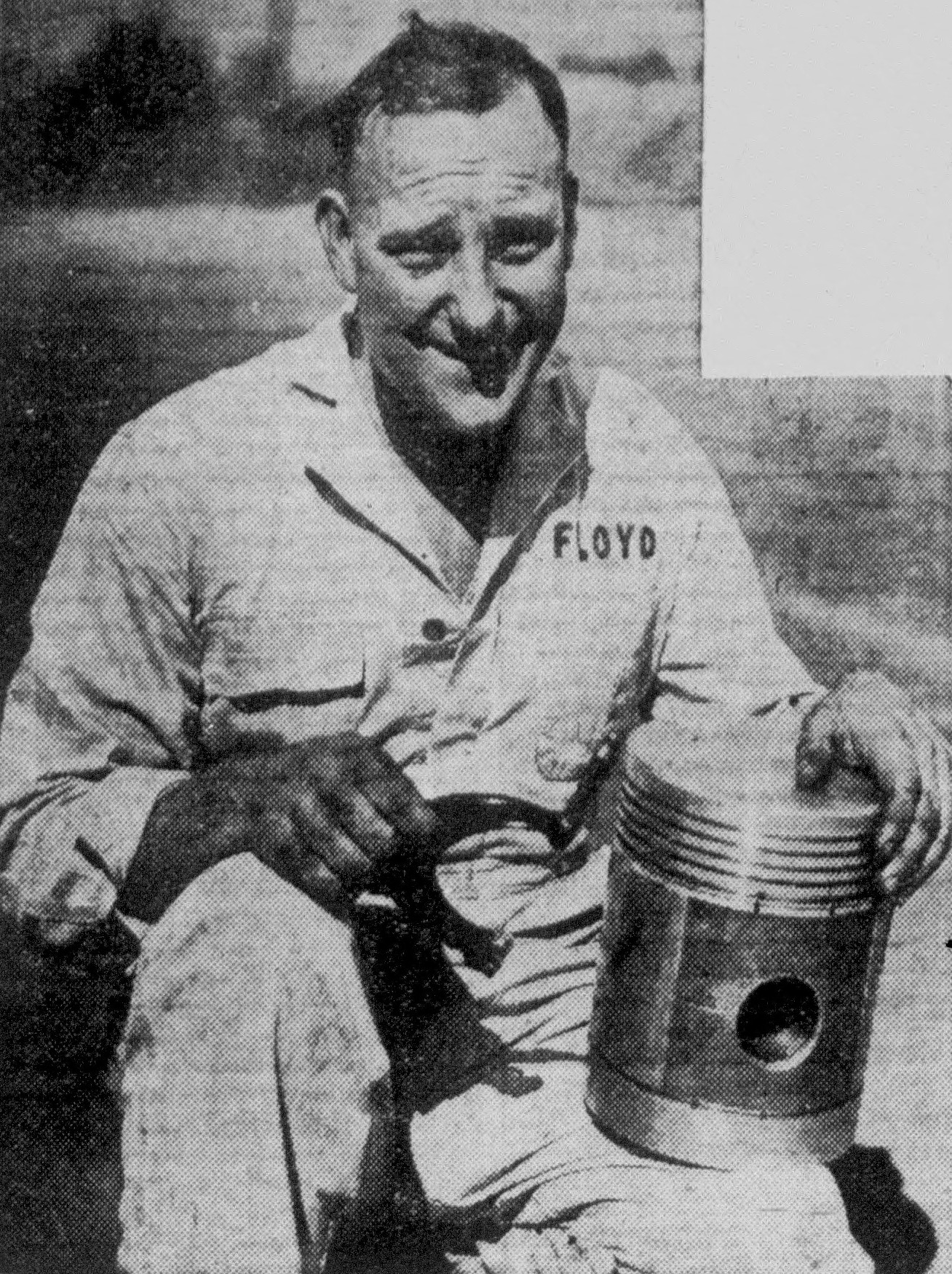
- Roberts, circa 1934
- Born: Floyd Marion Roberts; February 12, 1900 Jamestown, North Dakota, U.S.
- Died: May 30, 1939 (aged 39) Indianapolis, Indiana, U.S.

Championship titles
- AAA Championship Car (1938); Major victories Indianapolis 500 (1938)

Champ Car career
- 8 races run over 5 years
- Best finish: 1st (1938)
- First race: 1935 Indianapolis 500 (Indianapolis)
- Last race: 1939 Indianapolis 500 (Indianapolis)
- First win: 1938 Indianapolis 500 (Indianapolis)
Wins	Podiums	Poles
1	3	2

Floyd Marion Roberts (February 12, 1900 – May 30, 1939) was an American racing driver. He won the 1938 Indianapolis 500 with a then-record speed of 117.2 mph (188.6 km/h). He led for 92 laps. The following year, 1939, driving the same car, Roberts was killed in a crash. He was the first defending winner of the race to have been killed in competition.

== Early life ==
Roberts was born on February 12, 1900, in Jamestown, North Dakota. Father, Frederick Augustus Roberts and Mother, Ruby Lenore Roberts. Around 1920 Roberts moved to California. A story in the Van Nuys News reports that Floyd Roberts married Miss Edna Vincent after a surprise shower for the couple on 18 September 1925.

== Driving career ==
=== Early career ===
In 1924, prior to his marriage, Roberts was already becoming known in auto racing circles. He raced at the Ascot Speedway in California and participated in a series of races in Hawaii.

=== 1938 Indianapolis 500 ===
In qualifying, Roberts won the pole in his Burd Piston Ring Special, entered by car owner Lou Moore, at a record qualifying speed of 125.681 mph. At that time he had not won a major championship race in his 22-year career. He was quoted as saying, "My luck has always run in cycles. Now it's running good and I'll win."

During the race, Roberts and Wilbur Shaw, in gasoline-powered cars, fell behind several alcohol-fueled machines. When the latter cars had to pit for fuel before the petrol entries, Roberts first took the lead. He made his only pit stop for gas and a tire change at about 300 miles, and relinquished the lead to Jimmy Snyder. 75 miles later, Snyder came in a third time for more methanol, and Roberts, pulling away from Shaw, re-took a lead he would not give up again. He came home with a record average speed of over 117 mph. His share of winnings totaled over $32,000. Owner Moore said, "Floyd has always wanted to retire to a farm as soon as he had enough money. I am hoping he will."

== Death ==
At the 1939 Indianapolis 500, Roberts was on lap 106, when the car driven by Bob Swanson lost control and went sideways. Roberts's car struck Swanson's causing Swanson's car to flip over and catch fire ejecting Swanson.

Roberts's car went over the outer wall, through a fence at 100 mph (160 km/h) and headfirst into a tree. Attempting to avoid the accident, Chet Miller swerved into the debris field. His car flipped, and went into the inner wall. Two spectators were also injured by flying debris. The three drivers were taken to hospitals, while it took over 30 minutes to clear the burning wreck of Swanson's car from the track. Roberts died in Methodist Hospital, suffering a broken neck, among other injuries. His death was announced before the race was completed.

According to reports, Roberts had intended to retire following the race.

== Awards and honors ==
Roberts has been inducted into the following halls of fame:

- Auto Racing Hall of Fame (1985)

== Motorsports career results ==
=== Indianapolis 500 results ===
Year	Car	Start	Qual	Rank	Finish	Laps	Led	Retired
1935	22	3	118.671	3	4	200	0	Running
1936	4	15	112.403	29	19	183	0	Out of gas
1937	62	17	116.996	30	13	194	0	Flagged
1938	23	1	125.681	2	1	200	92	Running
1939	1	23	128.968	5	23	106	0	Crash BS
Totals						883	92	

Starts	5
Poles	1
Front row	2
Wins	1
Top 5	2
Top 10	2
Retired	2

Preceded by Wilbur Shaw	Indianapolis 500 Winner; 1938	Succeeded by Wilbur Shaw
