= Rex Mays =

American racing driver (1913–1949)

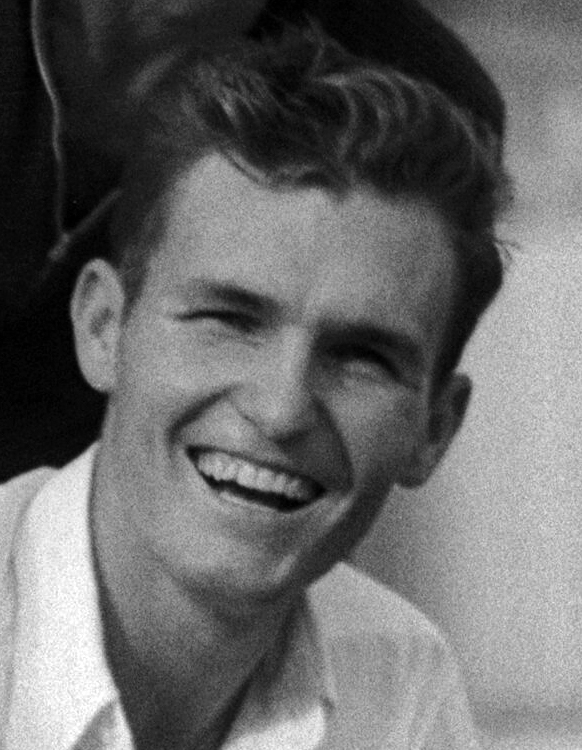
- Mays, circa 1935
- Born: Rex Houston Mays Jr. March 10, 1913 Riverside, California, U.S.
- Died: November 6, 1949 (aged 36) Del Mar, California, U.S.

Championship titles
- AAA West Coast Big Car (1934, 1935); AAA Midwest Big Car (1936, 1937); AAA Championship Car (1940, 1941)

Champ Car career
- 57 races run over 12 years
- Best finish: 1st (1940, 1941)
- First race: 1934 Indianapolis 500 (Indianapolis)
- Last race: 1949 Del Mar 100 (Del Mar)
- First win: 1936 Goshen 100 (Goshen)
- Last win: 1946 Milwaukee 100 (Milwaukee)
Wins	Podiums	Poles
8	19	19

Rex Houston Mays Jr. (March 10, 1913 – November 6, 1949) was an American racing driver. He was a two-time National Champion, won four poles for the Indianapolis 500, and is generally regarded as one of the greatest drivers of his era.

== Racing career ==
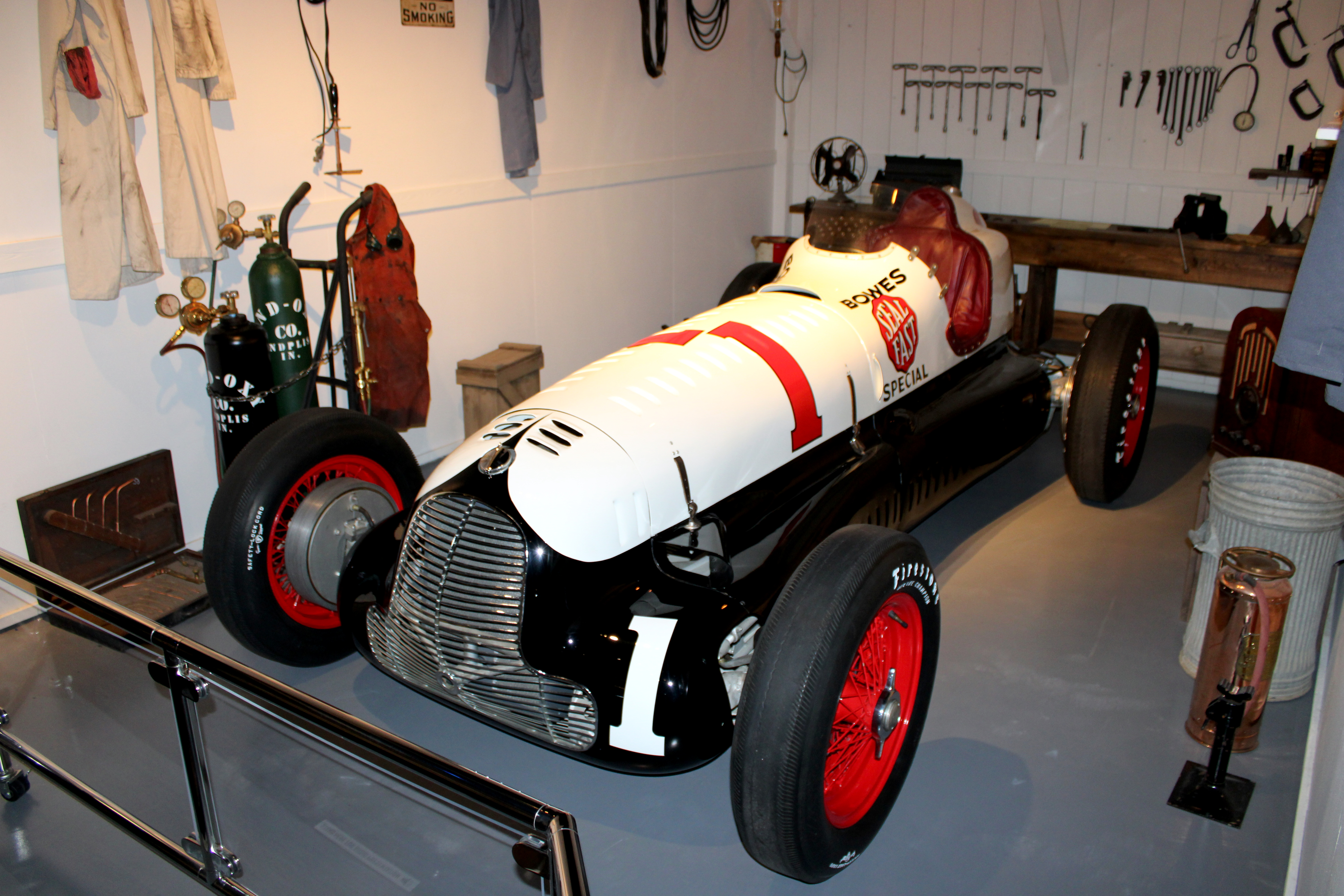
Rex Mays' 1941 Bowes Seal Fast Special on display at the Indianapolis Motor Speedway Museum

Mays won regional sprint car championships in the mid-1930s. He made his Indianapolis 500 debut in 1934 and won the pole in 1935, 1936, and again in 1940 and finished second, he returned the next year and finished second again. Mays won the AAA National Championship in 1940 and 1941. However, World War II suspended racing until 1946, denying Mays of what likely would have been the peak of his career. After the war, Mays again won the Indianapolis pole in 1948, but was knocked out by a mechanical problem.

On lap 4 of the Milwaukee State Fairground Park on June 6, 1948, Duke Dinsmore brushed the wall on the southern side of the track, resulting in his car turning over and tossing its driver onto the dirt track. With Dinsmore laying on the track, Mays intentionally turned his car into the brick wall to prevent himself from hitting the injured driver. Mays' car was too damaged to continue the race. Dinsmore was taken the hospital, where he was diagnosed with fracture of his forearm. Mays suffered no injuries after sacrificing his car. Surgeons at Milwaukee County Hospital stated on June 7 that Dinsmore was in recovery and out of danger.

== Death ==
Mays started second place at Del Mar Fairgrounds on November 6, 1949 alongside Jimmy Davies. On lap 13, he had been under challenge from Johnnie Parsons and in the southeast turn, spun towards the infield and eliminated 300 feet (91 m) of fencing to protect the grounds. Upon hitting the fencing, Mays' car was launched backed towards the track, ejecting Mays. Laying on the track, Mays' body was struck by three more cars driven by Paul Russo, Hal Cole and George Connor, running him over. Mays was loaded into an ambulance, but was dead at that point. Davies' victory was dealt with in silence as news of his death had reached the fans despite news being withheld by officials. The Deputy Coroner stated that Mays was killed upon impact. His body went to La Jolla then moved to Glendale, where he took up residence.

Mays' funeral was held on November 10 at the Church of the Recessional in Forest Lawn Memorial Park. Hundreds came to the funeral to honor Mays. Pop Myers, the vice president of the Indianapolis Motor Speedway attended, along with numerous drivers. Johnny Parsons, who was involved in the fatal accident, also attended the service. 251 sets of flora were sent and they came in different designs, including "Rex", "33" and a checkered flag. Mays' wife passed out twice during the funeral and a doctor was asked after the funeral to check on him. A planned flyover by the 731st Airlift Squadron of the United States Air Force that Mays served in, was abandoned due to the weather.

Mays estate was deemed at just under $12,000 (1949 USD) in December 1949. His will, signed on June 12, 1948, was probated by his widow Dorothea. Mays' racing equipment and vehicles would be sold and all proceeds from the sales would be turned into a trust fund for the couple's two children become 21 years old, at which point the estate would be divided equally between his wife and children.

After Mays' death, the 22nd Agricultural Association, who operated the Del Mar Fairgrounds, indefinitely suspended all auto racing at the facility. On December 14, 1949, the association announced that all auto racing would be banned on a permanent basis after a unanimous vote by the Board of Directors.

== Awards and honors ==
Mays has been inducted into the following halls of fame:

- Auto Racing Hall of Fame (1963)
- National Sprint Car Hall of Fame (1990)
- International Motorsports Hall of Fame (1993)
- Motorsports Hall of Fame of America (1995)
- Riverside Sport Hall of Fame

With his death, a memorial plaque was placed at the Milwaukee State Fairground Park in the south turn, the spot where he saved Duke Dinsmore's life in 1948. The dedication would be held on June 11, 1950 prior to the 100-mile (160 km) race, which would be renamed the Rex Mays Century in his honor. The Rex Mays Classic ran as such from 1950 to 1987 - at which time the Mays name was eliminated in favor of Miller High Life sponsorship. Riverside International Raceway also held an Indy car race named after Mays, the Rex Mays 300, which ran from 1967 to 1969. Dan Gurney won the 1967 and 1968 editions of the race, while Mario Andretti won the 1969 race. Les Richter of American Raceways stated that the 1970 edition was canceled because of a conflict with the Grand National 400 at Texas World Speedway on the chosen date of December 6. They felt that only one race should held on December 6 and that the Rex Mays 300 had been a money loser.

== Motorsports career results ==
=== AAA Championship Car results ===
Year	1	2	3	4	5	6	7	8	9	10	11	12	13	Pos	Points
1934	INDY; 23	SPR	NYS	MFD; 16										-	0
1935	INDY; 17	MIN	SPR	NYS	ALT	LAN								-	0
1936	INDY; 15	GTP; 1	NYS; 3	GVC; DNS										11th	200
1937	INDY; 33	GVC; 3	NYS; 13											8th	405
1938	INDY; 28	NYS; 2												13th	165
1939	INDY; 16	MIL; 17	NYS; 13											-	0
1940	INDY; 2	SPR; 1	NYS; 1											1st	1,225
1941	INDY; 2	MIL; 1	NYS; 1											1st	1,225
1946	INDY; 30	LAN; 1	ATL; 11	ISF; 1	MIL; 1	GOS; DNQ								9th	613
1947	INDY; 6	MIL; 2	LAN; DNQ	ATL; 12	BAI; 15	MIL; 10	GOS; DNS	MIL; 16	PIK	SPR; 16	ARL; 4			5th	765.7
1948	ARL; 16	INDY; 19	MIL; 17	LAN; 16	MIL; 4	SPR; 4	MIL; 7	DUQ; 17	ATL; 10	PIK	SPR; 14	DUQ; 18		13th	360
1949	ARL; 2	INDY; 25	MIL; 7	TRE; 10	SPR; 2	MIL; 3	DUQ; 15	PIK	NYS; 15	DET; 11	SPR; 2	SAC; 2	DMR; 18	6th	1,030

- 1946 table only includes results of the six races run to "championship car" specifications. Points total includes the 71 races run to "big car" specifications.

=== Indianapolis 500 results ===
Year	Car	Start	Qual	Rank	Finish	Laps	Led	Retired
1934	35	23	113.639	15	23	53	0	Front axle
1935	33	1	120.736	1	17	123	89	Spring shackle
1936	33	1	119.644	1	15	192	12	Out of gas
1937	14	23	119.968	10	33	24	0	Overheating
1938	8	3	122.845	5	28	45	16	Supercharger
1939	15	19	126.413	7	16	145	1	Rings
1940	33	1	127.850	1	2	200	59	Running
1941	1	2	128.301	2	2	200	38	Running
1946	1	14	128.861	2	30	26	3	Manifold
1947	9	20	124.412	7	6	200	0	Running
1948	5	1	130.577	2	19	129	36	Fuel leak
1949	5	2	129.552	4	25	48	12	Engine
Totals						1385	266	

Starts	12
Poles	4
Front Row	7
Wins	0
Top 5	2
Top 10	3
Retired	9
