= Lou Webb =

American racing driver (1911–1940)

- Born: Louis Edward Webb; September 6, 1911 Knoxville, Tennessee, U.S.
- Died: September 2, 1940 (aged 28) Syracuse, New York, U.S.

Champ Car career
- 2 races run over 4 years
- First race: 1940 Springfield 100 (Springfield)
- Last race: 1940 Syracuse 100 (Syracuse)
Wins	Podiums	Poles
0	0	0

Louis Edward Webb (September 6, 1911 – September 2, 1940) was an American racing driver. Predominantly racing midgets and big cars, he was killed in a AAA-sanctioned national championship race.

== Life and career ==
Webb was born in Knoxville, Tennessee. He and his brother Jack worked as mechanics in Glendale, California. Webb developed an interest in auto racing when he visited Legion Ascot Speedway where he began his racing career as a riding mechanic. Webb went on to become a driver, racing at Legion Ascot. He would later race on the east coast with AAA, and move into AAA Championship racing.

== Death ==
On September 2, 1940, Webb competed in a 100-mile AAA-sanctioned national championship race held at the New York State Fairgrounds in Syracuse before 40,000 spectators. On the 17th lap, he collided with Kelly Petillo, who was decreasing speed for turn one. Webb rode over Petillo's car, hurtled into the air and somersaulted down the track. Petillo was virtually unscathed, but Webb, who was ejected from his racer, died a little later.
