= Al Putnam =

American racing driver (1908–1946)

- Born: Adelbert William Putnam; October 9, 1908 Salt Lake City, Utah, U.S.
- Died: September 15, 1946 (aged 37) Indianapolis, Indiana, U.S.

Champ Car career
- 7 races run over 7 years
- Best finish: 12th (1941)
- First race: 1936 Vanderbilt Cup (Westbury)
- Last race: 1946 Indianapolis 500 (Indianapolis)
Wins	Podiums	Poles
0	0	0

Adelbert William Putnam (October 9, 1908 – September 15, 1946) was an American racing driver. Putnam was killed during qualifying for the first dirt-car race to be held at the Indiana State Fair.

== Motorsports career results ==
=== Indianapolis 500 results ===
Year	Car	Start	Qual	Rank	Finish	Laps	Led	Retired
1938	36	23	116.791	28	32	15	0	Crankshaft
1940	44	28	120.818	28	19	179	0	Flagged
1941	55	31	121.951	20	12	200	0	Running
1946	12	13	116.283	33	15	120	0	Magneto
Totals						514	0	

Starts	4
Poles	0
Front Row	0
Wins	0
Top 5	0
Top 10	0
Retired	2
