= Frank McGurk (racing driver) =

American racing driver (1915–1982)

- Born: Frank Joseph McGurk; June 19, 1915 Los Angeles, California, U.S.
- Died: February 7, 1982 (aged 66) Escondido, California, U.S.

Champ Car career
- 5 races run over 5 years
- Best finish: 15th (tie) (1941)
- First race: 1936 Indianapolis 500 (Indianapolis)
- Last race: 1941 Syracuse 100 (Syracuse)
Wins	Podiums	Poles
0	0	0

Frank Joseph McGurk (June 19, 1915 – February 7, 1982) was an American racing driver.

== Motorsports career results ==
=== Indianapolis 500 results ===
Year	Car	Start	Qual	Rank	Finish	Laps	Led	Retired
1936	52	22	113.102	24	26	51	0	Crankshaft
Totals						51	0	

Starts	1
Poles	0
Front Row	0
Wins	0
Top 5	0
Top 10	0
Retired	1
