= Jimmy Snyder (racing driver) =

American racing driver (1909–1939)

- Born: James Leroy Snider; March 10, 1909 Chicago, Illinois, U.S.
- Died: June 29, 1939 (aged 30) East St. Louis, Illinois, U.S.

Champ Car career
- 11 races run over 5 years
- Best finish: 2nd (1939)
- First race: 1935 Indianapolis 500 (Indianapolis)
- Last race: 1939 Indianapolis 500 (Indianapolis)
- First win: 1938 Syracuse 100 (Syracuse)
Wins	Podiums	Poles
1	3	2
- Football career

Profile
- Position: Tailback

Personal information
- Listed weight: 162 lb (73 kg)

Career information
- High school: Englewood (IL)
- College: none

Career history
- Milwaukee Badgers (1925)

Career statistics
- Games played: 1
- Stats at Pro Football Reference

James Leroy Snyder (March 10, 1909 – June 29, 1939) was an American racing driver. He also played one game for the Milwaukee Badgers of the National Football League (NFL) in 1925. Aged 16 during his NFL debut, he was the youngest player in NFL history.

== Football career ==
Snyder, a member of the Englewood High School football team, was convinced by Chicago Cardinals substitute quarterback Art Folz to play for the recently disbanded Milwaukee Badgers, who were being hastily reorganized to play against the Cardinals. In contention for the 1925 National Football League (NFL) season championship, the Cardinals were looking for an easy victory to pad their record.

Snyder along with three other Englewood students participated in the game under assumed names. Their amateur participation in the game, a 58-0 rout, later became a scandal resulting in punishment for Folz and the Chicago Cardinals.

== Racing career ==
Snyder was part of the midget car racing "Chicago Gang" with Emil Andres, Tony Bettenhausen, Cowboy O'Rourke, Paul Russo, and Wally Zale. These racers toured tracks in the Midwest and East Coast of the United States.

Snyder won the 1937 track championship at the Chicago Armory & Riverview. He also set a new track record at the Indianapolis Motor Speedway for that season's Indianapolis 500.

Snyder appeared in five Indianapolis 500s. He won the pole for the 1939 Indianapolis 500, setting another new track record in the process. He finished second in the event.

== Death ==
Snyder died in East St. Louis, Illinois hospital on June 29, 1939, shortly after being injured in a midget racing accident in Cahokia, Illinois.

== Motorsports career results ==
=== Indianapolis 500 results ===
Year	Car	Start	Qual	Rank	Finish	Laps	Led	Retired
1935	39	30	112.249	29	22	97	0	Spring
1936	43	16	111.291	32	30	21	0	Oil leak
1937	5	19	125.287	1	32	27	24	Transmission
1938	6	15	123.506	4	15	150	92	Supercharger
1939	10	1	130.138	1	2	200	65	Running
Totals						495	181	

Starts	5
Poles	1
Front Row	1
Wins	0
Top 5	1
Top 10	1
Retired	4
