= 2011 Indianapolis 500 =

American motor race

95th Indianapolis 500

Indianapolis Motor Speedway

Indianapolis 500
- Sanctioning body: INDYCAR
- Season: 2011 IndyCar season
- Date: May 29, 2011
- Winner: (United Kingdom) Dan Wheldon
- Winning team: Bryan Herta Autosport
- Winning Chief Mechanic: Don Lambert
- Time of race: 2:56:11.7267
- Average speed: 170.265 mph (274.015 km/h)
- Pole position: (Canada) Alex Tagliani
- Pole speed: 227.472 mph (366.081 km/h)
- Fastest qualifier: (Canada) Alex Tagliani
- Rookie of the Year: (United States) J. R. Hildebrand
- Most laps led: (New Zealand) Scott Dixon (73)

Pre-race ceremonies
- National anthem: Seal, Kelly Clarkson, and David Foster
- "Back Home Again in Indiana": Jim Nabors
- Starting command: Mari Hulman George
- Pace car: Chevrolet Camaro SS Convertible
- Pace car driver: A. J. Foyt
- Two-seater: Mario Andretti (driver); Sgt. Latseen Benson (passenger)
- Starter: Bryan Howard
- Honorary starter: Bruce P. Crandall
- Estimated attendance: Est. 300,000+

Television in the United States
- Network: ABC
- Announcers: Marty Reid, Scott Goodyear, Eddie Cheever
- Nielsen ratings: 4.0

Chronology
Previous	Next
2010	2012

The 95th Indianapolis 500 was held at the Indianapolis Motor Speedway in Speedway, Indiana on Sunday May 29, 2011. The race was part of the 2011 IZOD IndyCar Series season. The track opened for practice on May 14 and time trials were held May 21–22. Alex Tagliani won the pole position, and the race was won by Dan Wheldon. It was his second Indy 500 victory (2005, 2011) and the final win of his racing career. It was the first of two Indy victories for car owner Bryan Herta (2011, 2016).

Differing strategies from the frontrunners led to one of the most unexpected finishes in race history. Ganassi teammates Scott Dixon and Dario Franchitti combined to lead 124 laps, but pit stop strategy late in the race foiled both drivers. As the leaders were cycling through pit stops, rookie J. R. Hildebrand of Panther Racing took the lead with two laps to go. Hildebrand was nursing a car very low on fuel, and was attempting to stretch his tank to the finish line and hold on for a surprise victory. It would have been the first Indy win for Panther Racing, after three consecutive runner-up finishes, and two series championships. On the final turn of the final lap, Hildebrand went high to pass the slow car of Charlie Kimball. He drifted wide and crashed into the outside wall. As his wrecked car coasted down the front straight, Dan Wheldon slipped by in the final 1,000 feet to take the victory. Hildebrand slid across the finish line to place second. It was the second Indianapolis 500 that ended in a last lap pass after the 2006 race, and the only time to date that the race winner led only the final lap. Four months later, Wheldon was fatally injured in a crash in the IZOD IndyCar World Championship at Las Vegas Motor Speedway.

The race was the culmination of the three-year-long Centennial era, celebrating the 100th anniversary of the opening of the track (1909) and the 100th anniversary of the inaugural race in 1911. Throughout May, the race was advertised as the 100th Anniversary Indianapolis 500 and the Centennial Indianapolis 500. Since the race was suspended during World War I and World War II, the 100th running of the "500" would not be held until 2016.

== Event news ==
Indianapolis Motor Speedway, the race track where the race was held.

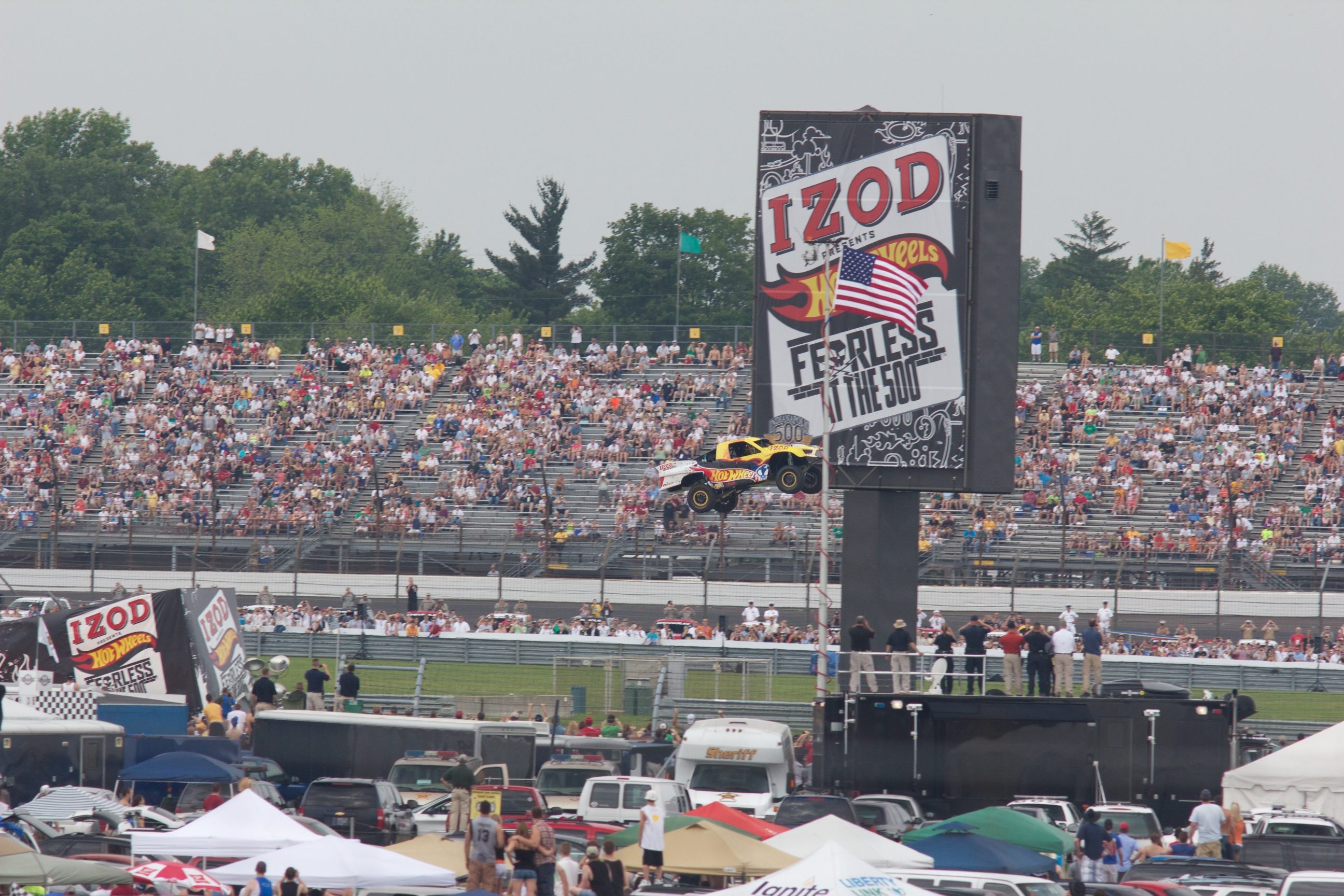
Tanner Foust from Team Hot Wheels sped down a 90-foot ramp, suspended on a 10-story high door and jumped across the Indianapolis Motor Speedway's infield inside the fourth turn.

- On February 21, the Speedway announced the start time for the race would be 12 noon EDT (UTC−04), one hour earlier that it had been scheduled from 2006 to 2010.
- The 100th anniversary Indy 500 Celebration of Automobiles was held the weekend of opening day. It was a classic/antique car show and contest featuring automobiles linked to race and to the city of Indianapolis from 1911 to 1961.
- Staind headlined the annual Carb Day concert on Friday May 27, with special guest Papa Roach.
- On April 5, Donald Trump was named the driver of the Chevrolet Camaro SS pace car. However, after mounting criticism of Trump, and a Facebook campaign to oust him from the position, he announced he was stepping down from the honor due to business and time constraints. He was replaced by four-time Indianapolis 500 winner A. J. Foyt.
- On the morning of the race, a special auto stunt was performed in the infield. For "IZOD Presents Hot Wheels Fearless at the 500", a mystery stunt driver (later to be revealed as Tanner Foust) from Team Hot Wheels sped down a 90-foot ramp, suspended on a 10-story high door and jumped across the track's infield inside the fourth turn.
- The national anthem was performed by Seal and Kelly Clarkson, accompanied by David Foster on piano.
- All of the 269 living Indy 500 veteran drivers were invited to attend the race. At least 161 attended during race weekend (including the 28 veteran drivers that qualified for the race) and upwards of 175 attended throughout the entire month of May. A total of 21 of the 27 living winners of the Indianapolis 500 attended the race. Those in attendance included:
  - Dario Franchitti, Hélio Castroneves, Scott Dixon, Dan Wheldon, and Buddy Rice who drove in the race
  - A. J. Foyt, Bobby Rahal, Rick Mears, Arie Luyendyk, and Mario Andretti who were team owners or had team-related duties
  - Johnny Rutherford and Al Unser Jr. who worked as officials
  - Eddie Cheever and Kenny Brack who worked in broadcasting
  - Gil de Ferran, Buddy Lazier, Emerson Fittipaldi, Tom Sneva, Bobby Unser, Al Unser, and Parnelli Jones also attended, taking part in various special pre-race activities.
  - Danny Sullivan made an appearance at the track during May but had to leave prior to race day due to a previous commitment.
  - Those not attending included Juan Pablo Montoya, who was at Charlotte for the Coca-Cola 600, Sam Hornish Jr., who was also in Charlotte for the Nationwide Series race; Jim Rathmann, who was in poor health and could not travel; Gordon Johncock and Jacques Villeneuve.
- In the days leading up to the race, a special list entitled The Greatest 33 was compiled from a panel of experts and fan voting, to establish the best drivers of the first century of the event.

=== Rule changes ===
- For the first time, double-file restarts were used. At the conclusion of yellow caution periods, the pace car would pull off in turn one, and the field would align in rows of two down the backstretch. The race leader paced the restart, and the entrance to turn four was the designated restart zone. Passing prior to the start/finish line was allowed if the green flag was waving, except on the first lap.
- The Honda overtake assist system ("Push-to-pass") was utilized. Each car was permitted 15 presses (18 seconds in duration) with a 10-second recharge time.

== Schedule ==
Race schedule — May 2011
Sun	Mon	Tue	Wed	Thu	Fri	Sat
1 São Paulo	2 São Paulo	3	4	5	6	7 Mini-Marathon
8	9 Testing	10	11	12; ROP	13	14; Practice
15; Practice	16; Practice	17; Practice	18; Practice	19; Practice	20; Practice	21; Pole Day
22; Bump Day	23	24	25; Comm. Day	26	27; Carb Day	28; Parade
29; Indy 500	30; Memorial Day	31				

Color	Notes
Green	Practice
Dark Blue	Time trials
Silver	Race day
Red	Rained out*
Blank	No track activity

* Includes days where track activity
was significantly limited due to rain

ROP — denotes Rookie Orientation Program

Comm. Day — denotes 500 Festival Community Day

=== Other events ===
- May 7 – Hot-air balloon festival / Emerging Technologies Day
- May 13 – Freedom 100 testing
- May 14 – 100th Anniversary Indy 500 Celebration of Automobiles
- May 26 – Freedom 100 practice and time trials
- May 27 – Freedom 100 race, Carb Day concert
- May 28 – Public Drivers Meeting, Memorabilia Show, Autograph sessions, 500 Festival Parade

== Entry list ==
See Team and driver chart for more information

On April 15, 2011, the Official Entry List was released, featuring 83 cars for 42 entries. As of April 15, thirty-five car/driver combinations had been announced. On May 9, a revised version of the entry list was released. The entry from China Racing was withdrawn. The final list includes 79 cars for 41 entries.

Confirmed former winners entered include Dario Franchitti, Hélio Castroneves, Scott Dixon, Dan Wheldon, and Buddy Rice.

== Rookie orientation ==
=== Pre-Indy oval testing ===
Since the Indy 500 was the first oval race of the 2011 season, per IndyCar regulations, rookies who have not competed on an oval were required to take part in Pre-Indy Oval testing. Scott Speed and Ho-Pin Tung, along with Wade Cunningham (who didn't race Indy but participated at Texas) completed the test at Chicagoland Speedway on May 9. Speed was legally exempt from this test because of previous high-speed oval experience in ARCA and NASCAR, but chose to test with his teammate to learn the car.

=== Thursday, May 12 – Rookie Orientation Program ===
- Weather: 83 °F (28 °C), overcast
- Practice summary: Seven rookies participated in the rookie orientation program. For 2011, the session was open to rookies only in order to pass the four-part rookie test. There would not be any refresher tests (phases three and four) for part-time veteran drivers as had been in years past. The drivers included: J. R. Hildebrand, James Hinchcliffe, James Jakes, Charlie Kimball, Ho-Pin Tung, Pippa Mann and Scott Speed. Six drivers completed all four phases, while Jakes completed three. Jakes can complete the fourth and final phase at any time prior to time trials on May 21. J. R. Hildebrand (221.533 mph (356.523 km/h)) turned the fastest lap of the day, and no incidents were reported. An eighth Indy 500 rookie is entered, Jay Howard, who is an IndyCar Series veteran (four starts in 2010). He failed to qualify for the Indy 500 in 2010, however since he passed all four phases of the rookie test, and has other oval experience from 2010, he was exempted from participating.

Top Practice Speeds
Pos	No.	Driver	Team	Speed
1	4	(United States) J. R. Hildebrand	Panther Racing	221.533
2	8	(China) Ho-Pin Tung	Dragon Racing	220.477
3	06	(Canada) James Hinchcliffe	Newman/Haas Racing	219.602
OFFICIAL REPORT

== Practice ==
=== Saturday, May 14 – Opening Day ===
- Weather: 67 °F (19 °C), overcast/ rain
- Practice summary: On opening day, 32 cars took to the track, completing 669 laps with no incidents reported. Ed Carpenter led the speed chart at 224.786 mph (361.758 km/h). Around 3 p.m., rain halted the session, but the track dried, and practice resumed for a short time. At 5:30 p.m., rain returned and the session came to a close.

Top Practice Speeds
Pos	No.	Driver	Team	Speed
1	67	(United States) Ed Carpenter	Sarah Fisher Racing	224.786
2	9T	(New Zealand) Scott Dixon	Chip Ganassi Racing	224.491
3	4T	(United States) J. R. Hildebrand	Panther Racing	224.433
OFFICIAL REPORT

=== Sunday, May 15 ===
- Weather: 56 °F (13 °C), rain
- Practice summary: Rain washed out practice for the entire day.

=== Monday, May 16 ===
- Weather: 58 °F (14 °C), partly cloudy/ overcast
- Practice summary: In the first full practice for the 2011 Indianapolis 500 (1,379 total laps run), Alex Tagliani of Sam Schmidt Motorsports ran the fastest lap of the day, and of the month so far, at 225.878. The top three rounded out with former winner Scott Dixon coming in second and Graham Rahal finishing third on the day. A total of 39 drivers took to the track, on a cool, windy afternoon. No incidents were reported.

Top Practice Speeds
Pos	No.	Driver	Team	Speed
1	77	(Canada) Alex Tagliani	Sam Schmidt Motorsports	225.878
2	9	(New Zealand) Scott Dixon	Chip Ganassi Racing	225.124
3	38	(United States) Graham Rahal	Chip Ganassi Racing	225.071
OFFICIAL REPORT

=== Tuesday, May 17 ===
- Weather: 51 °F (11 °C), overcast/ rain
- Practice summary: Cold temperatures delayed the start of practice until 1:12 p.m. Firestone requires the ambient and track temperature to be over 50 °F (10 °C) before cars are allowed to enter the track. Only two drivers (teammates Marco Andretti and Mike Conway) managed to take laps, and few teams left the garage area. Lingering moisture kept the yellow light on most of the afternoon, and the track closed officially for the day at 4:05 p.m.

Top Practice Speeds
Pos	No.	Driver	Team	Speed
1	26	(United States) Marco Andretti	Andretti Autosport	220.656
2	27	(United Kingdom) Mike Conway	Andretti Autosport	219.910
OFFICIAL REPORT

=== Wednesday, May 18 ===
- Weather: 57 °F (14 °C), overcast/ rain
- Practice summary: Rain washed out practice for the entire day.

=== Thursday, May 19 ===
- Weather: 72 °F (22 °C), partly cloudy
- Practice summary: After two consecutive rainouts (and three overall), the cars took to the track for a full day of practice. At 12:25 p.m., Simona de Silvestro's car lost control in the north chute after leaking fluid, causing her to spin and flip up into the catch fence. The car came to a rest upside-down, with flames coming from the sides, but she climbed from the car and walked to the safety truck. She was transported to Methodist Hospital with second degree burns on her right hand. Following the accident, practice resumed uninterrupted for the rest of the day with Will Power taking the top position, putting up the fastest speed of the month to date. Power was followed by Alex Tagliani and teammate Ryan Briscoe in the top speed charts.

Top Practice Speeds
Pos	No.	Driver	Team	Speed
1	12	(Australia) Will Power	Team Penske	227.778
2	77	(Canada) Alex Tagliani	Sam Schmidt Motorsports	227.652
3	6	(Australia) Ryan Briscoe	Team Penske	227.217
OFFICIAL REPORT

=== Friday, May 20 – Fast Friday ===
- Weather: 84 °F (29 °C), sunny/ partly cloudy
- Practice summary: Fast Friday saw the second consecutive day of full practice. Alex Tagliani was atop the leader board for most of the day, like many of the practice sessions before, breaking the record speed during the month at over 228 mph (367 km/h). However, later in the day, three-time Indianapolis 500 winner Hélio Castroneves took to the top five in practice for the first time this month, running a best 228.611 mph (367.914 km/h). Castroneves stayed in first position for the rest of the day with Tagliani finishing second, who has finished in the top three on all three full practices of the year. The 2008 Indianapolis 500 winner, Scott Dixon finished third on the day with a speed over 228 mph (367 km/h).

Late in the day, reports surfaced that Scott Speed had quit Dragon Racing, after having trouble getting up to speed. The rumor was denied.

Top Practice Speeds
Pos	No.	Driver	Team	Speed
1	3	(Brazil) Hélio Castroneves	Team Penske	228.611
2	77	(Canada) Alex Tagliani	Sam Schmidt Motorsports	228.327
3	9	(New Zealand) Scott Dixon	Chip Ganassi Racing	228.181
OFFICIAL REPORT

== Time Trials ==
=== Saturday May 21 – Pole Day ===
- Weather: 78 °F (26 °C), partly cloudy/ periodic rain

==== Practice ====
- Practice summary: The final practice before Pole Day commenced at 8:00 AM EDT with the first group taking the track for 30 minutes of practice. In the first session, Ryan Briscoe crashed his car coming out on turn two and was forced to practice the rest of the day with his back-up car. After the green flag came back out there were no more interruptions during the practice with the second group finishing their 30 minutes of practice and the remainder of the time given to all the cars for practice. After the two hours session, it was Alex Tagliani who held the top position, with Buddy Rice making his first appearance in the "fast five", and Will Power rounding out the top three.

Top Practice Speeds
Pos	No.	Driver	Team	Speed
1	77	(Canada) Alex Tagliani	Sam Schmidt Motorsports	228.184
2	44	(United States) Buddy Rice	Panther Racing	227.849
3	12	(Australia) Will Power	Team Penske	227.766
OFFICIAL REPORT

==== Qualifying ====
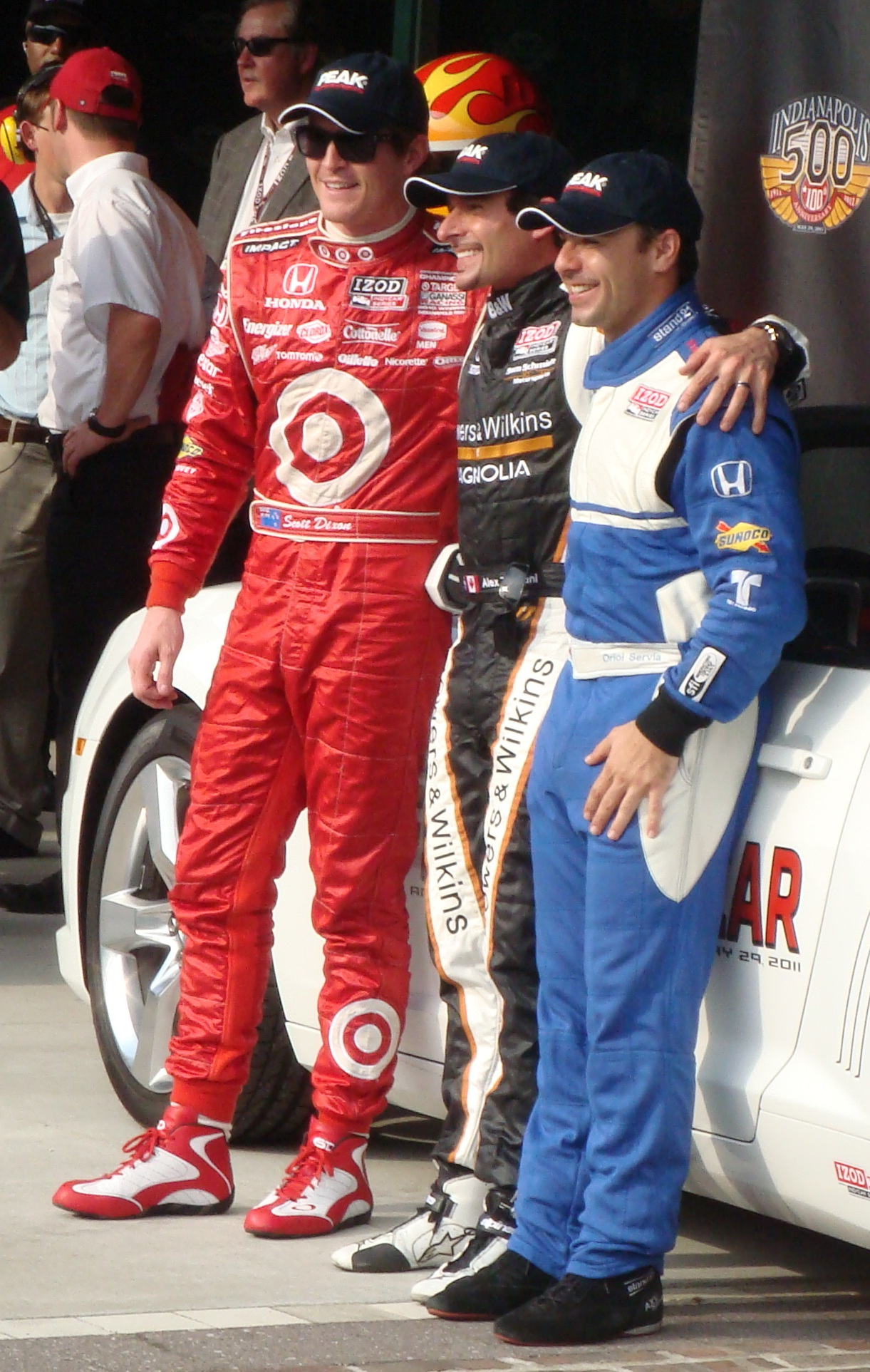
Front row qualifiers (L to R): Scott Dixon, Alex Tagliani, and Oriol Servià.

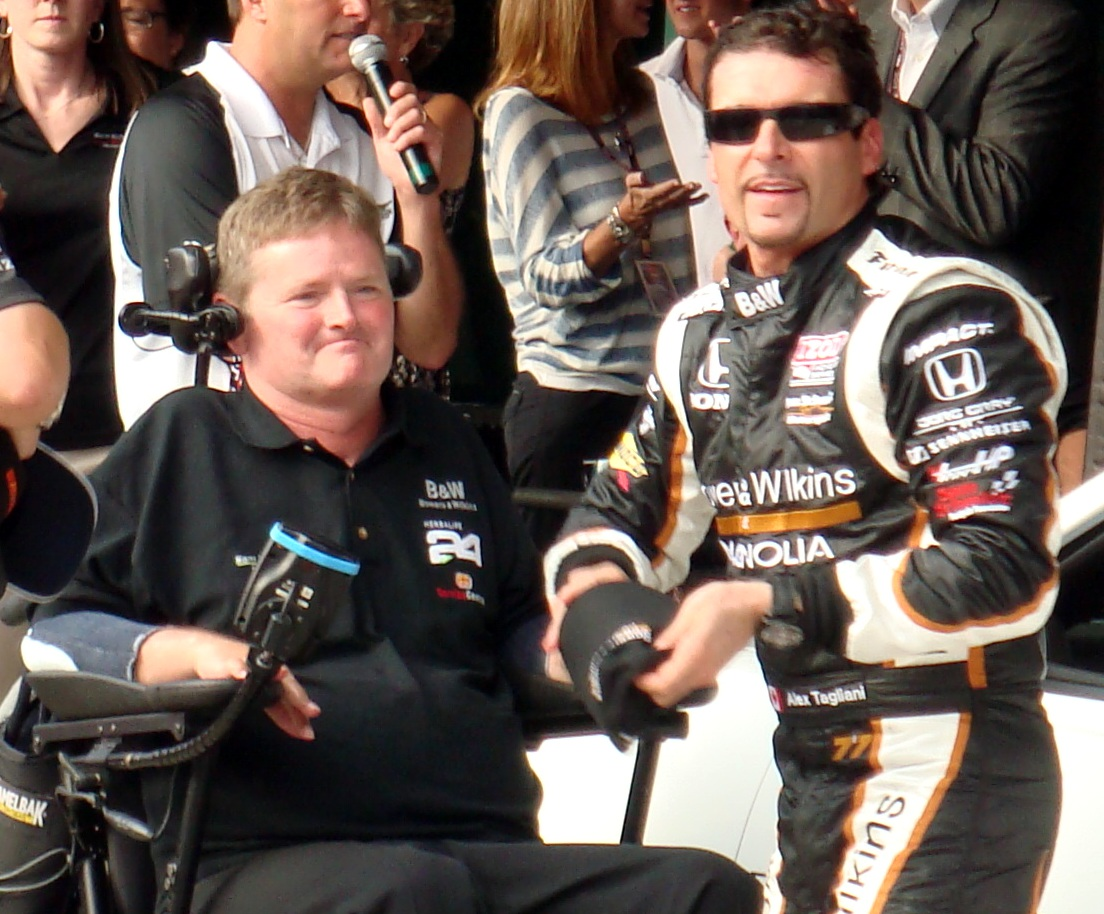
Car owner Sam Schmidt with pole winner Alex Tagliani.

- First segment summary: The first segment was scheduled from 11 a.m. until 4 p.m. All drivers in the qualifying order were guaranteed at least one opportunity to make a qualifying attempt. The top 24 would make up the provisional starting field. The top nine would advance to the pole position "shootout". Alex Tagliani set the pace early, with a run of 226.954 mph (365.247 km/h). Other drivers putting in top 9 speeds included Dan Wheldon, Townsend Bell, and Will Power. The day was headlined by several part-time IndyCar teams, while several full-time contenders struggled mightily. Penske failed to get all three of their cars in the top 9; after his morning practice crash, Ryan Briscoe failed to make the top 24. Hélio Castroneves, trying to become the first driver to win three consecutive Indy poles, missed the top 9. All five cars of Andretti Autosport struggled, with John Andretti the only driver to crack the top 24. Ed Carpenter was one of the final drivers to make an attempt, and qualified with an impressive 226.171 mph (363.987 km/h), good enough for 6th fastest for Sarah Fisher Racing. After being burned in a crash on Thursday, Simona de Silvestro made three qualifying attempts, and on her third attempt, managed to qualify 24th. The only crash of the session was by Ho-Pin Tung, who wrecked on his final lap and suffered a concussion. A short rain shower ended the session about 25 minutes early.
- Fast Nine Shootout summary: Rain delayed the start of the Fast Nine "shootout", therefore each of the nine participants were allowed only one attempt at the pole position. The top nine drivers from the earlier segment took to the track in reverse order of speed. Oriol Servià set the pace early with a run of 227.168 mph (365.591 km/h). Dario Franchitti was running fast enough to clinch a front row position, but he ran out of fuel on the final lap and dropped to ninth. Scott Dixon was the second to last driver to make an attempt. He took over the provisional pole position from Servià, and he himself ran out of fuel in the last few seconds of his run. Alex Tagliani was the final driver to go out. His run of 227.472 mph (366.081 km/h) secured the pole position for Sam Schmidt Motorsports.

Pole Day – Saturday, May 21, 2011Fast Nine Shootout (positions 1–9)
Pos	No.	Driver	Team	Speed	Pts
1	77	(Canada) Alex Tagliani	Sam Schmidt Motorsports	227.472 mph (366 km/h)	15
2	9	(New Zealand) Scott Dixon	Chip Ganassi Racing	227.340 mph (366 km/h)	13
3	2	(Spain) Oriol Servià	Newman/Haas Racing	227.168 mph (366 km/h)	12
4	99	(United States) Townsend Bell	Sam Schmidt Motorsports	226.887 mph (365 km/h)	11
5	12	(Australia) Will Power	Team Penske	226.773 mph (365 km/h)	10
6	98	(United Kingdom) Dan Wheldon	Bryan Herta Autosport	226.490 mph (365 km/h)	9
7	44	(United States) Buddy Rice	Panther Racing	225.786 mph (363 km/h)	8
8	67	(United States) Ed Carpenter	Sarah Fisher Racing	225.121 mph (362 km/h)	7
9	10	(United Kingdom) Dario Franchitti	Chip Ganassi Racing	No time	6
OFFICIAL REPORT

Positions 10–24
Pos	No.	Driver	Team	Speed	Pts
10	5	(Japan) Takuma Sato	KV Racing Technology – Lotus	225.736 mph (363 km/h)	4
11	14	(Brazil) Vítor Meira	A. J. Foyt Enterprises	225.590 mph (363 km/h)	4
12	4	(United States) J. R. Hildebrand R	Panther Racing	225.579 mph (363 km/h)	4
13	06	(Canada) James Hinchcliffe R	Newman/Haas Racing	225.572 mph (363 km/h)	4
14	30	(Belgium) Bertrand Baguette	Rahal Letterman Lanigan Racing	225.285 mph (363 km/h)	4
15	11	(United States) Davey Hamilton	Dreyer & Reinbold Racing	225.250 mph (363 km/h)	4
16	3	(Brazil) Hélio Castroneves	Team Penske	225.216 mph (362 km/h)	4
17	43	(United States) John Andretti	Andretti Autosport	224.981 mph (362 km/h)	4
18	59	(Venezuela) E. J. Viso	KV Racing Technology – Lotus	224.732 mph (362 km/h)	4
19	41	(Brazil) Bruno Junqueira	A. J. Foyt Enterprises	224.691 mph (362 km/h)	4
20	22	(United Kingdom) Justin Wilson	Dreyer & Reinbold Racing	224.511 mph (361 km/h)	4
21	88	(United Kingdom) Jay Howard R	Sam Schmidt Motorsports	224.483 mph (361 km/h)	4
22	07	(South Africa) Tomas Scheckter	SH Racing	224.433 mph (361 km/h)	4
23	82	(Brazil) Tony Kanaan	KV Racing Technology – Lotus	224.417 mph (361 km/h)	4
24	78T	(Switzerland) Simona de Silvestro	HVM Racing	224.392 mph (361 km/h)	4
OFFICIAL REPORT

=== Sunday May 22 – Bump Day ===
- Weather:

==== Practice ====
- Practice summary: Patrick Carpentier took over for Scott Speed in the Dragon Racing entry, and took several shake down laps in the morning session. However, his effort ended when he crashed in turn 1. Around noon, Dragon Racing announced they were withdrawing, and would not attempt to qualify. Charlie Kimball topped the speed chart with a lap of 226.822 mph (365.035 km/h).

Top Practice Speeds
Pos	No.	Driver	Team	Speed
1	83	(United States) Charlie Kimball	Chip Ganassi Racing	226.822 mph (365 km/h)
2	7	(United States) Danica Patrick	Andretti Autosport	226.252 mph (364 km/h)
3	26	(United States) Marco Andretti	Andretti Autosport	226.181 mph (364 km/h)
OFFICIAL REPORT

==== Qualifying ====
- Bump Day summary – First segment: Qualifying began at noon, with thunderstorms approaching. Only two cars (Ana Beatriz and Graham Rahal) made it onto the track before heavy rains fell at the track. Track crews dried the racing surface, and the track re-opened for qualifying at 2:30 p.m.
- Second segment: A hectic period of qualifying saw the field filled to 33 cars, and bumping began. Paul Tracy took to the track, with weather once again threatening. He completed his run in light misty rain, and bumped his way into the field with the fastest run of the day. Danica Patrick was the next car in line at 3:15 p.m., and the only car that had not yet made an attempt Sunday. However, the rain returned, and halted track activity. There was considerable concern that Patrick may not get an opportunity to qualify, if the rain continued the remainder of the day.
- Third segment: Crews dried the track, and it re-opened at 4:45 p.m. Danica Patrick was the first car out, and bumped her way in comfortably. The rest of the Andretti Autosport team, however, was struggling with speed. Mike Conway made three attempts, and was too slow to qualify. In the final fifteen minutes, Marco Andretti was on the bubble, and his teammate Ryan Hunter-Reay was the second slowest. Alex Lloyd took to track, and bumped out Marco Andretti in the final five minutes. Andretti hurried to get back in the qualifying line, but was beaten by James Jakes. Jakes was waved off after two slow laps, which gave Andretti one final chance to bump his way back in. With 55 seconds left before the 6 o'clock gun, Andretti pulled away from the pits. His qualifying run of 224.628 mph (361.504 km/h) bumped Ryan Hunter-Reay from the field.

Bump Day – Sunday, May 22, 2011
Pos	No.	Driver	Team	Speed	Pts
25	23	(Canada) Paul Tracy	Dreyer & Reinbold Racing	224.939 mph (362 km/h)	3
26	7	(United States) Danica Patrick	Andretti Autosport	224.861 mph (362 km/h)	3
27	6T	(Australia) Ryan Briscoe	Team Penske	224.639 mph (362 km/h)	3
28	26	(United States) Marco Andretti	Andretti Autosport	224.628 mph (362 km/h)	3
29	83	(United States) Charlie Kimball R	Chip Ganassi Racing	224.499 mph (361 km/h)	3
30	38	(United States) Graham Rahal	Chip Ganassi Racing	224.380 mph (361 km/h)	3
31	19	(United Kingdom) Alex Lloyd	Dale Coyne Racing	223.957 mph (360 km/h)	3
32	36	(United Kingdom) Pippa Mann R	Conquest Racing	223.936 mph (360 km/h)	3
33	24	(Brazil) Ana Beatriz	Dreyer & Reinbold Racing	223.879 mph (360 km/h)	3
OFFICIAL REPORT

== Carb Day ==
=== Indianapolis 500 Final Practice – Friday May 27 ===
- Weather: 61 °F (16 °C), partly cloudy
- Practice summary: The final practice before the 2011 Indianapolis 500 saw all 33 qualified cars take to the track during the hour. Former winner Scott Dixon saw the fastest time of the session while pole-sitter, Alex Tagliani, who had been very fast for most of the month, came into second with a lap speed of 224.739 mph (361.682 km/h). Former winner Dario Franchitti closed out the top three for the day, a day when over 1,000 laps were run by all cars in the preparation for the race.

Top Practice Speeds
Pos	No.	Driver	Team	Speed
1	9	(New Zealand) Scott Dixon	Chip Ganassi Racing	225.474
2	77	(Canada) Alex Tagliani	Sam Schmidt Motorsports	224.739
3	10	(United Kingdom) Dario Franchitti	Chip Ganassi Racing	224.658
OFFICIAL REPORT

=== Pit Stop Challenge ===
The 34th annual Pit Stop Challenge was held Friday May 27. The crew of Ryan Briscoe (Penske) defeated Dario Franchitti (Ganassi) in the final round. It was the 13th victory for Penske in the event.

First Round
3	Hélio Castroneves (Team Penske)
28	Ryan Hunter-Reay (Andretti/Foyt)
19	Alex Lloyd (Dale Coyne Racing)
06	James Hinchcliffe (Newman/Haas)
82	Tony Kanaan (KV Racing)
26	Marco Andretti (Andretti Autosport)
5	Takuma Sato (KV Racing)
22	Justin Wilson; Dreyer & Reinbold)

Quarterfinals
12	Will Power (Team Penske)
28	Ryan Hunter-Reay (Andretti/Foyt)
10	Dario Franchitti (Chip Ganassi Racing)
19	Alex Lloyd (Dale Coyne Racing)
9	Scott Dixon (Chip Ganassi Racing)
82	Tony Kanaan (KV Racing)
6	Ryan Briscoe (Team Penske)
22	Justin Wilson; Dreyer & Reinbold)

Semifinals
12	Will Power (Team Penske)
10	Dario Franchitti (Chip Ganassi Racing)
82	Tony Kanaan (KV Racing)
6	Ryan Briscoe (Team Penske)

Finals
10	Dario Franchitti (Chip Ganassi Racing)	8.481
6	Ryan Briscoe (Team Penske)	7.882

== Starting grid ==
W = Former Indianapolis 500 winner; R = Indianapolis 500 rookie

Row	Inside		Middle		Outside	
1	77	(Canada) Alex Tagliani	9	(New Zealand) Scott Dixon W	2	(Spain) Oriol Servià
2	99	(United States) Townsend Bell	12	(Australia) Will Power	98	(United Kingdom) Dan Wheldon W
3	44	(United States) Buddy Rice W	67	(United States) Ed Carpenter	10	(United Kingdom) Dario Franchitti W
4	5	(Japan) Takuma Sato	14	(Brazil) Vítor Meira	4	(United States) J. R. Hildebrand R
5	06	(Canada) James Hinchcliffe R	30	(Belgium) Bertrand Baguette	11	(United States) Davey Hamilton
6	3	(Brazil) Hélio Castroneves W	43	(United States) John Andretti	59	(Venezuela) E. J. Viso
7	22	(United Kingdom) Justin Wilson	88	(United Kingdom) Jay Howard R	07	(South Africa) Tomas Scheckter
8	82	(Brazil) Tony Kanaan	78	(Switzerland) Simona de Silvestro	23	(Canada) Paul Tracy
9	7	(United States) Danica Patrick	6	(Australia) Ryan Briscoe	26	(United States) Marco Andretti
10	83	(United States) Charlie Kimball R	38	(United States) Graham Rahal	19	(United Kingdom) Alex Lloyd
11	36	(United Kingdom) Pippa Mann R	24	(Brazil) Ana Beatriz	41	(United States) Ryan Hunter-Reay^{1}

Post-qualifying changes

^{1} On Monday, May 23, Andretti Autosport and A. J. Foyt Enterprises reached an agreement for Ryan Hunter-Reay to replace Bruno Junqueira as driver of the #41 car. Per race rules, the car, which had originally qualified for the 19th starting position, was moved to the end of the field.

Failed to qualify

No.	Driver	Team	Reason
8	(China) Ho-Pin Tung R	Dragon Racing	Crashed during qualifying attempt on Pole Day, not medically cleared to continue taking part in qualifying.
17	(Brazil) Raphael Matos	AFS Racing	Bumped from the field, too slow to re-qualify.
18	(United Kingdom) James Jakes R	Dale Coyne Racing	Bumped from the field, too slow to re-qualify.
20	(United States) Scott Speed R (Canada) Patrick Carpentier	Dragon Racing	Speed did not attempt to qualify on Pole Day. Team withdrew on Bump Day after Carpentier crashed and the team could not secure a back-up car.
27	(United Kingdom) Mike Conway	Andretti Autosport	Bumped from the field, too slow to re-qualify.
28	(United States) Ryan Hunter-Reay	Andretti Autosport	Bumped from the field – replaced Bruno Junqueira in the #41.
34	(Colombia) Sebastián Saavedra	Conquest Racing	Bumped from the field, too slow to re-qualify.

== Race ==
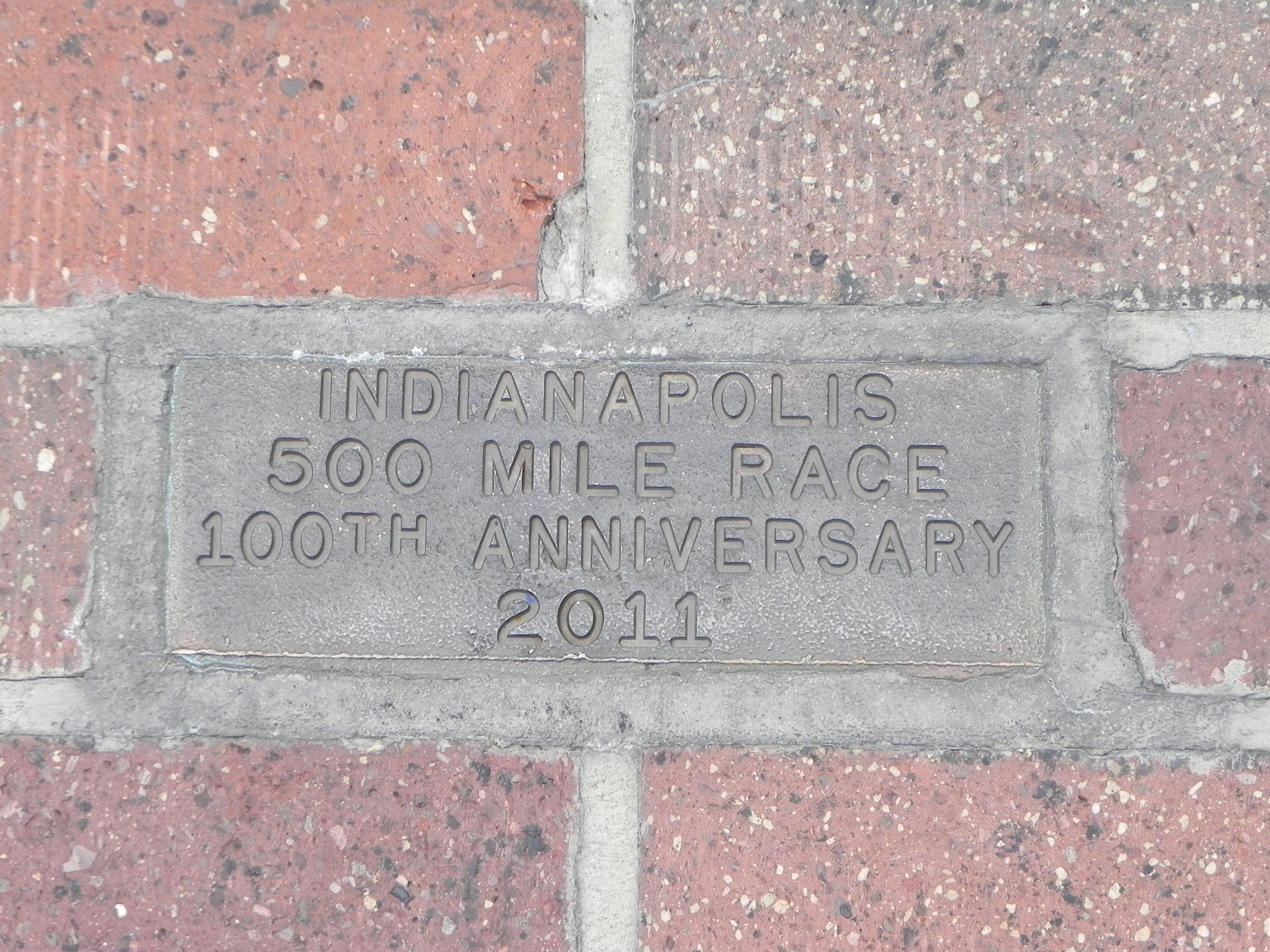
A ceremonial golden brick was installed at the start/finish line of the track to commemorate the 100th anniversary

=== Summary ===
==== First half ====
The 95th running of the Indianapolis 500 began at 12:00 PM EDT on a hot, muggy day, shortly after the traditional pre-race ceremonies of the invocation, national anthem, and the singing Back Home Again in Indiana by Jim Nabors. Mari Hulman George gave the starting command around 12:05 PM, as the cars took two parade laps and one pace lap, led by four-time Indianapolis 500 winner A. J. Foyt, who was driving the pace car. The green flag came out to see Scott Dixon pass by pole-sitter Alex Tagliani to take the early lead in the race. The first 20 laps of the race saw a relatively smooth pace set in. Unlike past years there was no accident in the first two laps, with the first caution coming out on Lap 21 when Takuma Sato made contact with the wall. During the first caution period many team made pit-stops including Will Power who left the pit area and drove a lap without a left-rear tire, which all but eliminated the IndyCar points leader from having an opportunity to win the race.

Shortly following the green flag restart (which was changed to a two-car abreast start during the drivers meetings) Sato's teammate, E. J. Viso was turned heading into turn 1 by James Hinchcliffe and was the next driver to make contact with the wall and eliminate himself from the race. Following the cleanup and restart after Viso's crash saw the field taking shape and aligning themselves for the long 400+ miles remaining. Simona de Silvestro, who was burned in a crash earlier in the month, was not able to pick up speed in her back-up car and quickly fell from 23rd position, to last. On lap 44, it was clear that the car would not be able to keep up with the field, she was called into the pits and her day was over.

Defending winner Dario Franchitti, along with Scott Dixon, Alex Tagliani, and Oriol Servià all began to take their places at the top of the field with each of them leading more than 10 laps in the race respectively. Later accidents occurred with rookies Jay Howard and James Hinchcliffe. Howard lost a right-rear wheel on lap 61, while Hinchcliffe slid high in turn 3 and bounced off the wall at the halfway mark.

==== Second half ====
Following James Hinchcliffe's crash on lap 101, the green flag remained out for over 40 laps as many different drivers shared the lead and got in position for the shootout in the final 10. On lap 148, it was the pole-sitter Alex Tagliani who would be called into pit lane after making slight contact with the wall. Tagliani, who had not had a good day, started in first, fell all the way down to 12th before the crash, was finished for the day, with his final finish position being 28th. One of the few multi-car crashes of the day occurred on lap 158 between Ryan Briscoe and Townsend Bell. Up to that point in the day, Team Penske had been running slow and really did not have a good shot at any of their drivers winning the race, and with the crash and elimination of Ryan Briscoe all hope seemed gone as Hélio Castroneves and Will Power were both down due to bad pit stops and slow cars. With no more lengthy cautions the remainder of the race it turned into a fight for the lead as the laps dwindled down.

As the race prepared to go back to green on lap 164, a handful of drivers ducked into the pit area to top off their fuel, in hopes of going the distance without another pit stop. Dario Franchitti and J. R. Hildebrand were among those who gave up their track position, and topped off their fuel.

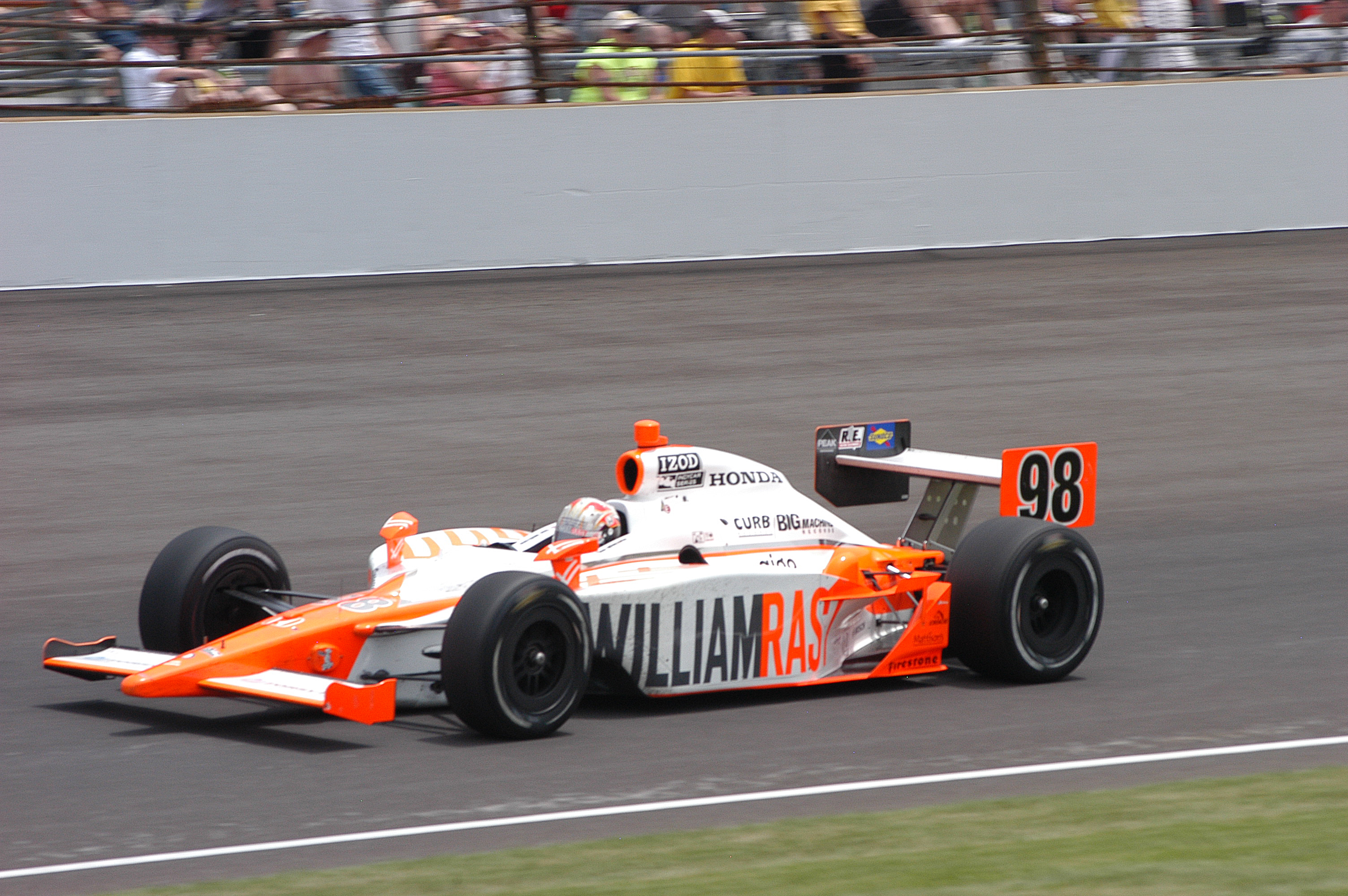
Dan Wheldon

For the first time in his Indy career, Graham Rahal took the lead of the race and held it for six laps. However, he lost a battle to Scott Dixon and was forced to a pit stop which dropped out of the top five. However, he was able to finish the race in third place. Tony Kanaan also saw his flirt with Indy glory as he made his way all from the middle of the pack to second place at one point, but was forced as well to drop on a pit stop with less than 20 laps to go. As the race came to down to its final 15 laps, it was still Scott Dixon and Dario Franchitti, two Chip Ganassi Racing cars and former winners, who looked like they would win the race. However, late in the race after a series of pit stops by most in the lead, it was an unlikely Bertrand Baguette who would lead the race as the action came to it climax. Baguette was expected to pit again but as the laps dwindled down and he did not come in, it became increasingly likely that this new face would win the race.

The final 10 laps became a battle between Baguette, Franchitti, and rookie J. R. Hildebrand (all of whom were all trying to stretch their fuel to the finish), as well as Dixon and Dan Wheldon behind but good to the finish having recently pitted. With three laps to go, Baguette pitted for fuel and Franchitti continued to slow to conserve fuel. This gave the lead to Hildebrand while Franchitti continued to fade, falling behind Dixon and the charging Wheldon. As the field was given the white flag, it seemed all but certain a rookie would win the 500 for the first time since Castroneves won it in 2001. Hildebrand moved his way down into the north short chute and down into turn four. Coming in on the front stretch, Hildebrand went high to avoid the slower car of Charlie Kimball, who was on the inside line, and collided with the wall. Without steering and on only three wheels, the car slid down the frontstretch towards the finish line. Dan Wheldon, who was second, skirted by in the final 1,000 feet, and crossed the line to win the race. Hildebrand continued to slide, and crossed the finish line in second.

==== Post-race ====
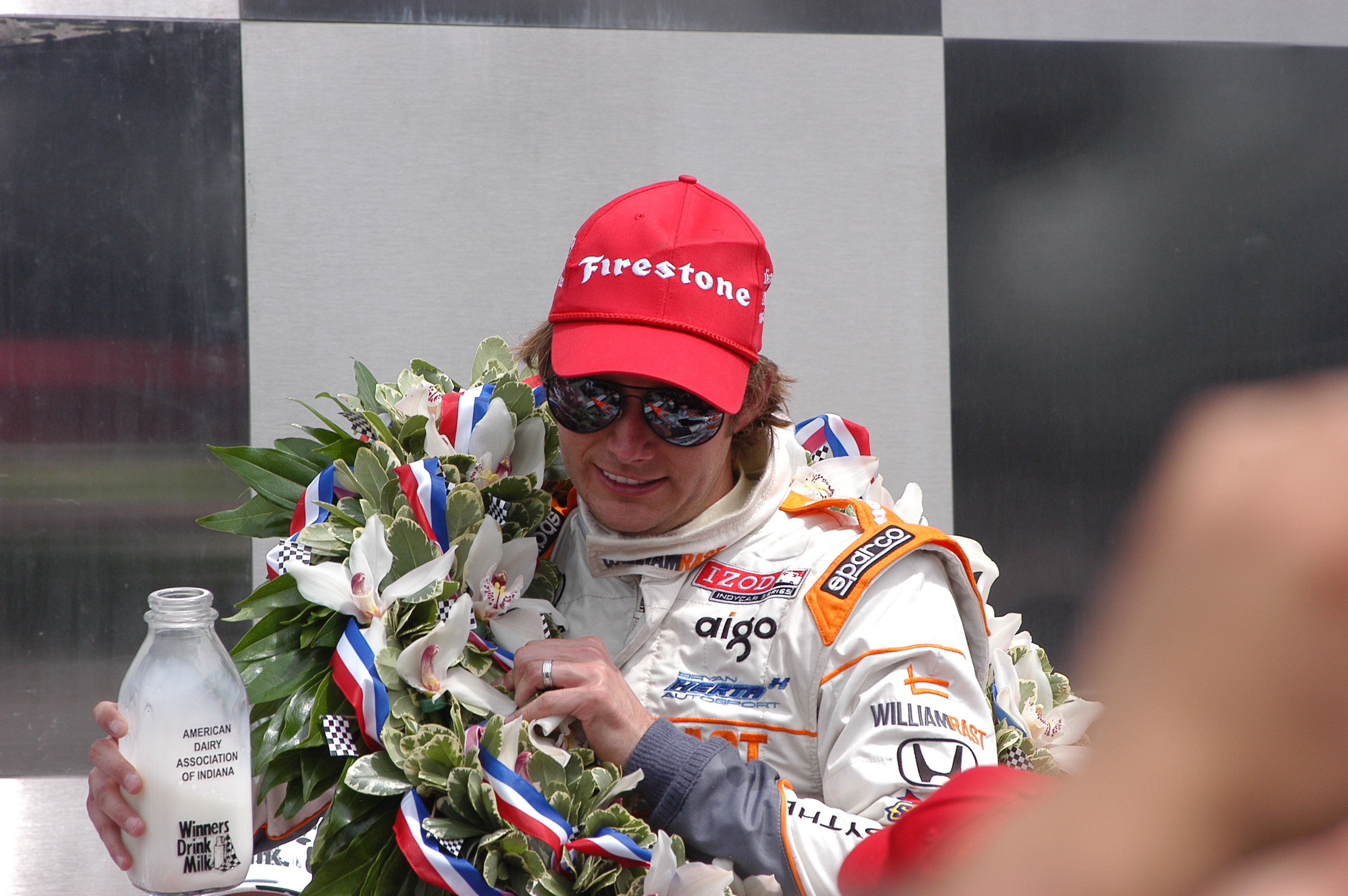
Race winner Dan Wheldon celebrates in victory lane

Dan Wheldon became the 18th person to win two or more Indianapolis 500's, his first coming in 2005. The 200th lap was the only one he led in the race, breaking Joe Dawson's 99-year-old record for the fewest laps led by an Indy winner. As he took to victory lane, he celebrated with the traditional ceremonies of the wreath, glass of milk, and the presentation of the Borg Warner Trophy. As the celebration was occurring, his former team Panther Racing considered filing for a review, stating that Wheldon made an illegal pass during the yellow on Hildebrand's car. In the end, video showed that the yellow did not come out until after Wheldon had passed, and even if it would have come out before the pass, the president of competition ruled that Hildebrand's car was a "wounded car", and was therefore allowed to be passed in the race.

Wheldon's average speed of 170.265 mph (274.015 km/h) was the fourth-fastest Indy 500 in history, and was the first Indy 500 completed in less than three hours since Juan Pablo Montoya won in 2000.

== Box score ==
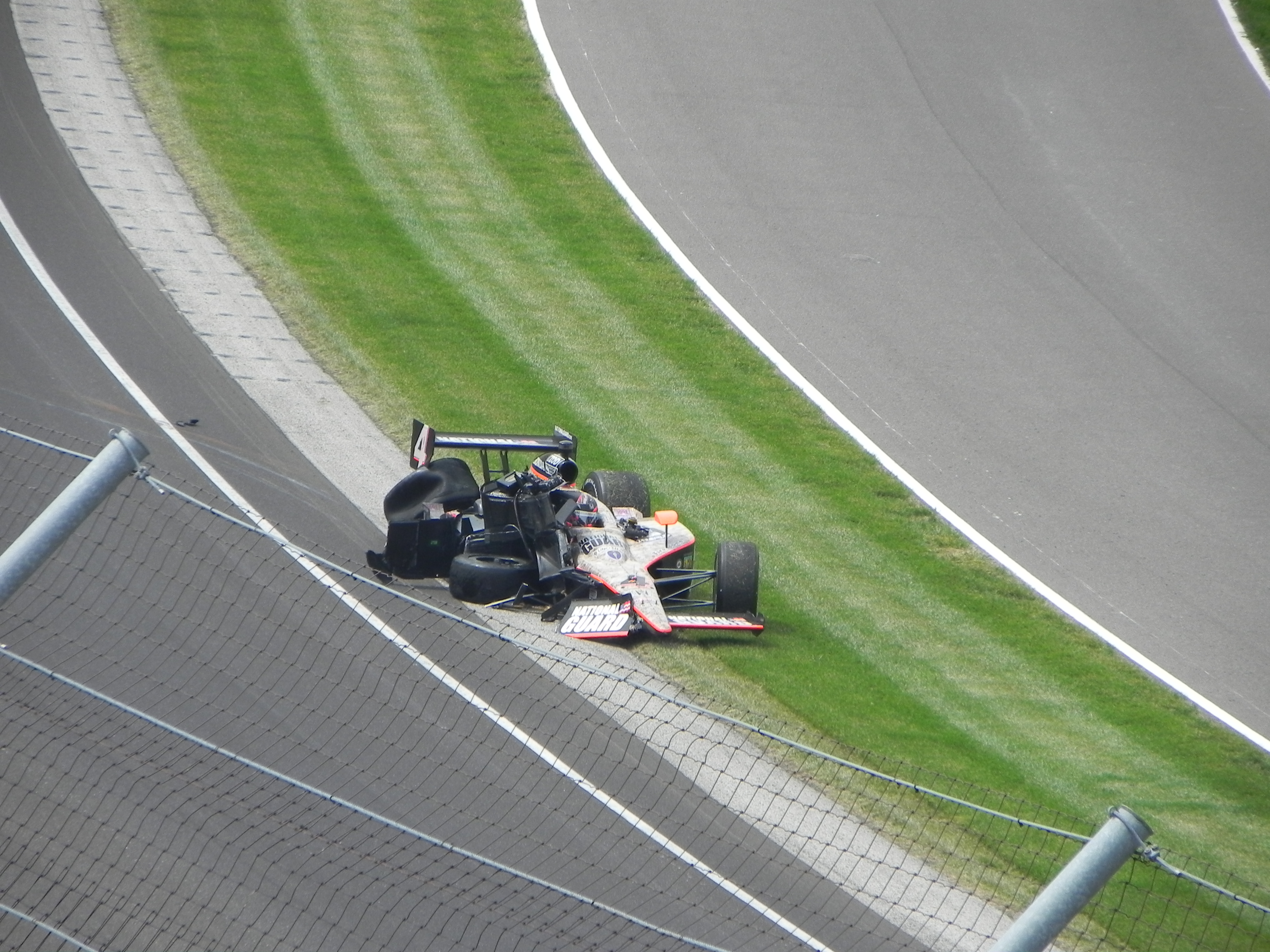
J. R. Hildebrand crashed on the final lap

Pos	No.	Driver	Team	Chassis	Engine	Laps	Status	Grid	Points
1	98	(United Kingdom) Dan Wheldon W	Bryan Herta Autosport	Dallara	Honda	200	170.265 mph	6	59
2	4	(United States) J. R. Hildebrand R	Panther Racing	Dallara	Honda	200	+2.1086	12	44
3	38	(United States) Graham Rahal	Chip Ganassi Racing	Dallara	Honda	200	+5.5949	29	38
4	82	(Brazil) Tony Kanaan	KV Racing Technology – Lotus	Dallara	Honda	200	+7.4870	22	36
5	9	(New Zealand) Scott Dixon W ^{1}	Chip Ganassi Racing	Dallara	Honda	200	+9.5434	2	45
6	2	(Spain) Oriol Servià^{1}	Newman/Haas Racing	Dallara	Honda	200	+9.5435*	3	42
7	30	(Belgium) Bertrand Baguette	Rahal Letterman Lanigan Racing	Dallara	Honda	200	+23.9631	14	30
8	07	(South Africa) Tomas Scheckter	SH Racing	Dallara	Honda	200	+24.3299	21	28
9	26	(United States) Marco Andretti	Andretti Autosport	Dallara	Honda	200	+25.7411	27	25
10	7	(United States) Danica Patrick	Andretti Autosport	Dallara	Honda	200	+26.4483	25	23
11	67	(United States) Ed Carpenter	Sarah Fisher Racing	Dallara	Honda	200	+27.0375	8	26
12	10	(United Kingdom) Dario Franchitti W	Chip Ganassi Racing	Dallara	Honda	200	+56.4167	9	24
13	83	(United States) Charlie Kimball R	Chip Ganassi Racing	Dallara	Honda	199	-1 lap	28	20
14	12	(Australia) Will Power	Team Penske	Dallara	Honda	199	-1 lap	5	26
15	14	(Brazil) Vítor Meira	A. J. Foyt Enterprises	Dallara	Honda	199	-1 lap	11	19
16	22	(United Kingdom) Justin Wilson	Dreyer & Reinbold Racing	Dallara	Honda	199	-1 lap	19	18
17	3	(Brazil) Hélio Castroneves W	Team Penske	Dallara	Honda	199	-1 lap	16	17
18	44	(United States) Buddy Rice W	Panther Racing	Dallara	Honda	198	-2 laps	7	20
19	19	(United Kingdom) Alex Lloyd	Dale Coyne Racing	Dallara	Honda	198	-2 laps	30	15
20	36	(United Kingdom) Pippa Mann R	Conquest Racing	Dallara	Honda	198	-2 laps	31	15
21	24	(Brazil) Ana Beatriz	Dreyer & Reinbold Racing	Dallara	Honda	197	-3 laps	32	15
22	43	(United States) John Andretti	Andretti Autosport	Dallara	Honda	197	-3 laps	17	16
23	41	(United States) Ryan Hunter-Reay	A. J. Foyt Enterprises	Dallara	Honda	197	-3 laps	33	12
24	11	(United States) Davey Hamilton	Dreyer & Reinbold Racing	Dallara	Honda	193	-7 laps	15	16
25	23	(Canada) Paul Tracy	Dreyer & Reinbold Racing	Dallara	Honda	175	-25 laps	24	13
26	99	(United States) Townsend Bell	Sam Schmidt Motorsports	Dallara	Honda	157	Contact	4	21
27	6	(Australia) Ryan Briscoe	Team Penske	Dallara	Honda	157	Contact	26	13
28	77	(Canada) Alex Tagliani	Sam Schmidt Motorsports	Dallara	Honda	147	Contact	1	25
29	06	(Canada) James Hinchcliffe R	Newman/Haas Racing	Dallara	Honda	99	Contact	13	14
30	88	(United Kingdom) Jay Howard R	Sam Schmidt Motorsports	Dallara	Honda	60	Contact	20	14
31	78	(Switzerland) Simona de Silvestro	HVM Racing	Dallara	Honda	44	Handling	23	14
32	59	(Venezuela) E. J. Viso	KV Racing Technology – Lotus	Dallara	Honda	27	Contact	18	14
33	5	(Japan) Takuma Sato	KV Racing Technology – Lotus	Dallara	Honda	20	Contact	10	14

W Former Indianapolis 500 winner

R Indianapolis 500 Rookie

All entrants utilized Firestone tires.

Note: Unofficially Oriol Servià finished 5th, 8.8757 seconds behind the leader, with Scott Dixon placing 6th. When the official results were posted, it was determined that Servia passed Dixon on the final lap while the yellow caution light was illuminated. Officials re-instated Dixon to 5th, and dropped Servia to 6th in the final standings.

=== Race statistics ===
Lap Leaders
Laps	Leader
1–7	Scott Dixon
8–26	Alex Tagliani
27–33	Scott Dixon
34	Alex Tagliani
35–60	Scott Dixon
61	Dario Franchitti
62–64	Ed Carpenter
65–72	Dario Franchitti
73–98	Scott Dixon
99	Dario Franchitti
100–103	J. R. Hildebrand
104–112	Dario Franchitti
113–128	Oriol Servia
129–137	Dario Franchitti
138	J. R. Hildebrand
139–140	Bertrand Baguette
141–163	Dario Franchitti
164–165	Oriol Servia
166–171	Graham Rahal
172–178	Scott Dixon
179–188	Danica Patrick
189–197	Bertrand Baguette
198–199	J. R. Hildebrand
200	Dan Wheldon

Total laps led
Driver	Laps
Scott Dixon	73
Dario Franchitti	51
Alex Tagliani	20
Oriol Servia	18
Bertrand Baguette	11
Danica Patrick	10
J. R. Hildebrand	7
Graham Rahal	6
Ed Carpenter	3
Dan Wheldon	1

Cautions: 7 for 40 laps
Laps	Reason
21–26	Takuma Sato crash in turn 2
28–32	James Hinchcliffe, E. J. Viso crash in turn 1
62–69	Jay Howard crash in turn 1
101–106	James Hinchcliffe crash in turn 3
148–154	Alex Tagliani crash in turn 4
158–164	Ryan Briscoe, Townsend Bell crash in turn 1
200	J. R. Hildebrand crash in turn 4

== Awards ==
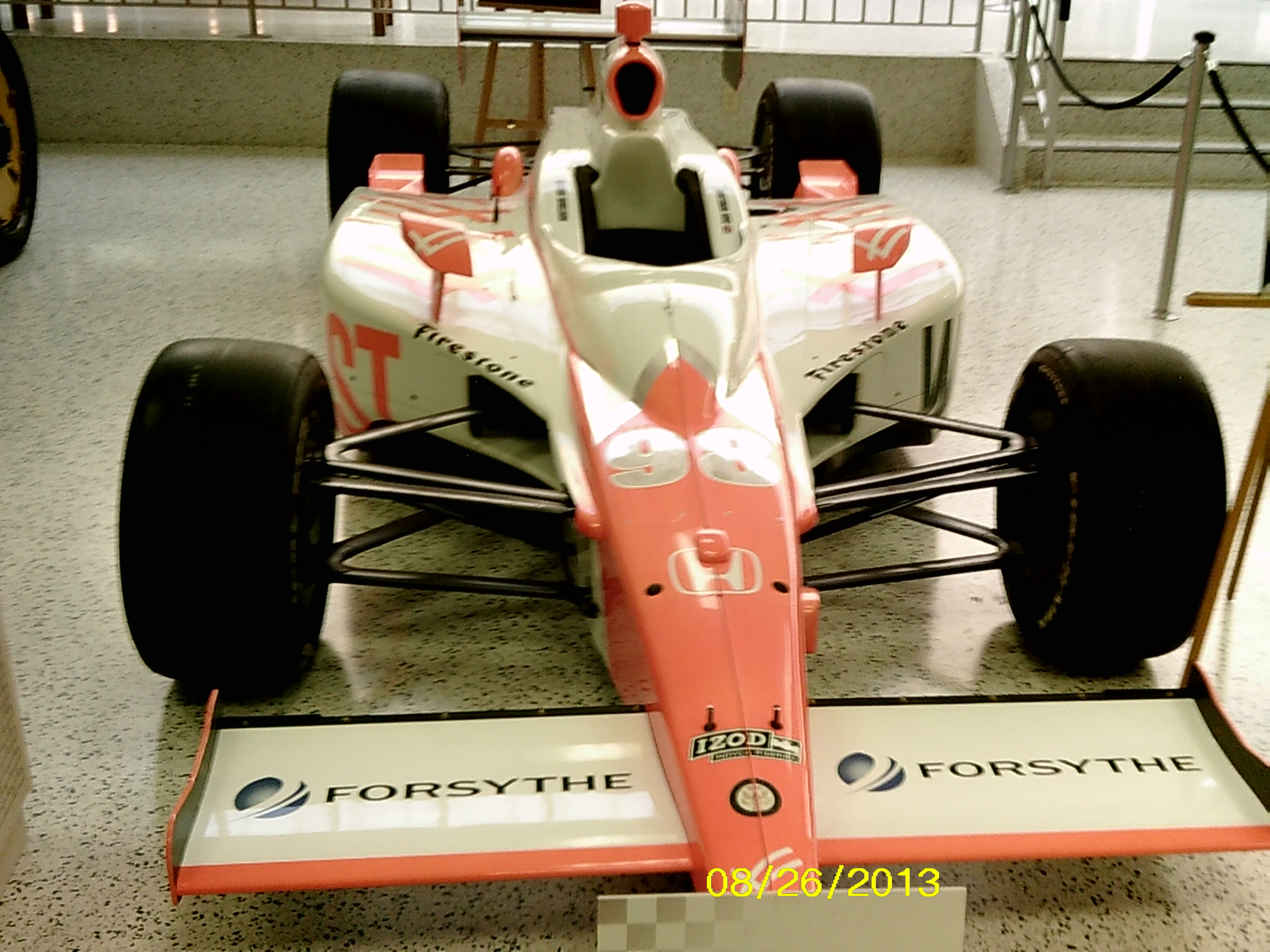
Winning car on display in 2012.

Race winner Dan Wheldon received $2,567,255 in cash prizes and designated awards.

Typically, the presentation of the Borg-Warner Trophy replicas ("Baby Borg") for the driver and owner takes place in January in Detroit during the North American International Auto Show, but Wheldon was killed at Las Vegas in October. Car owners Bryan Herta and Steve Newey, along with Wheldon's widow Susie, were presented in Detroit with their trophies.

The Indianapolis 500-winning car, Dallara IR3007, was the seventh chassis made by Dallara Automobili from the 2003 specifications. Originally a Panther Racing car, it was sold to Adrian Fernandez and later Marty Roth, before FAZZT bought the car in 2010, which became Sam Schmidt Motorsports' car in 2011 when it was used to win the Indianapolis 500. It was raced the next race at Texas Motor Speedway as a Sam Schmidt Motorsports #99 for Wade Cunningham, who crashed it in the first of the Twin 275 km races. The car has been rebuilt and restored in 2011 Indianapolis 500 condition as part of a Wheldon tribute. (Andretti Autosport owns the other Wheldon winner, and is restoring that car too in 2005 Indianapolis 500 race-winning trim.)

== Broadcasting ==
=== Television ===
The race was televised in high definition in the United States on ABC, the 47th consecutive year on that network. Marty Reid served as anchor. The telecast utilized the Side-by-Side format for commercial breaks. In the Indianapolis market, the live broadcast was blacked out on WRTV, and shown same-day tape delay in prime time. In some markets in northern Indiana, the final 15 laps of the race were not shown due to a weather bulletin.

The race received a 4.3 overnight rating on ABC, up 7% over 2010. The top local markets included Indianapolis (14.5), Dayton (10.5), and Fort Myers/Naples (8.5). The final rating was 4.0 with 6.711 million viewers, up 11% in ratings and 16% in viewership compared to 2010.

ABC Television
Booth Announcers	Pit/garage reporters
Host: Brent Musburger; Announcer: Marty Reid; Color: Scott Goodyear; Color: Eddie Cheever	Vince Welch; Dr. Jerry Punch; Jamie Little; Rick DeBruhl

Time trials and Carb Day were covered live in the United States on Versus. The announcing team consisted of Bob Jenkins, Jon Beekhuis and Wally Dallenbach Jr. Pit reporters included Lindy Thackston, Marty Snider, and Kevin Lee. Robin Miller serves as analyst and "insider".

Daily practice was streamed live over the internet.

=== Radio ===
The race was broadcast on radio by the IMS Radio Network. Mike King served as anchor. The broadcast reached approximately 400 affiliates, as well as AFN, the LeSEA broadcasting network, and World Harvest Radio. The broadcast was carried on XM channel 145 and on Sirius channel 212 through the "Best of XM" package.

After eliminating the position for 2010, the turn one location was brought back for the broadcast. Jerry Baker reprised his role in turn 1. The position was brought back in response to the league adopting double-wide restarts. Kenny Brack returned as "driver expert", joining the booth in-progress after participating in various pre-race festivities.

WFNI broadcast nightly from the track with Trackside with Curt Cavin and Kevin Lee, followed by Donald Davidson's The Talk of Gasoline Alley.

In 2010, drivers from the starting field were used to recite the famous out-cue "Stay tuned for the greatest spectacle in racing." For 2011, in celebration of the Centennial Era, the out-cues for each commercial break were recordings of previous renditions by the former "Voices of the 500". Each commercial break would feature a different chief announcer, rotating through Sid Collins, Paul Page, Lou Palmer, Bob Jenkins, and Mike King. This format was also used in 2009.

Indianapolis Motor Speedway Radio Network
Booth Announcers	Turn Reporters	Pit/garage reporters
Chief Announcer: Mike King; Driver expert: Kenny Brack; Analyst: Paul Page; Historian: Donald Davidson; Live in-car reports: Davey Hamilton; Commentary: Bob Jenkins	Turn 1: Jerry Baker; Turn 2: Jake Query; Turn 3: Mark Jaynes; Turn 4: Chris Denari	Michael Young (north pits); Nick Yeoman (center pits); Kevin Lee (south pits); Dave Wilson (garages)

== See also ==
- 2011 IndyCar Series season

Previous race: São Paulo Indy 300	IndyCar Series; 2011 season	Next race: Firestone Twin 275s
Previous race: 2010 Indianapolis 500	Indianapolis 500	Next race: 2012 Indianapolis 500
