= The Greatest 33 =

List of top drivers from the history of the Indianapolis 50

The Greatest 33 is a list of top drivers from the history of the Indianapolis 500. In 2011, in celebration of the 100th anniversary of the first Indianapolis 500, the Indianapolis Motor Speedway gathered a panel of media and historians to establish 100 nominees for the best drivers who have participated in the Indianapolis 500 from 1911 to 2010. During the months leading up the race, fans were invited to vote on the best 33 among the nominees, and the finalists were announced in the days leading up to the 2011 race.

The selection of 33 drivers reflects the traditional 33 starters that comprise the field for the Indianapolis 500 annually.

== Selection process ==
Of the 732 drivers who had participated in the Indianapolis 500 from 1911 to 2010, a list of 100 nominees was narrowed down by a panel of experts. The criteria were somewhat loose, as winning the race was not necessarily a requirement for inclusion. At the time, only 68 drivers had won the race, and of those, only 57 were nominated. Other factors that were weighed included: pole position winners, lap leaders, rookies of the year, individual statistical accomplishments, accomplishments of a historical nature, and popular fixtures.

The original list of 100 drivers was released on March 18, and voting continued through May 14.

The final list of 33 drivers was announced May 15. The three four-time Indy 500 winners A. J. Foyt, Al Unser Sr., and Rick Mears comprised the front row. The three most recent three-time winners Bobby Unser, Johnny Rutherford, and Hélio Castroneves, made up the second row. Three non-winners, Tony Bettenhausen Sr., Dan Gurney, and Michael Andretti, were selected, although Gurney and Andretti were former race-winning owners, and both had second-place finishes as drivers. Ray Harroun, winner of the inaugural race was situated in row nine, alongside Tommy Milton, the first-ever two-time winner.

All 17 of the multiple Indy 500 winners going into the 2011 race were included on the list. Of the thirty-three finalists, twenty-one were living at the time the list was released. Only four drivers (Castroneves, Franchitti, Dixon, and Montoya) on the list were considered active in professional-level motorsports at the time.

== Grid ==
Row	Inside	Middle	Outside
1	(United States) A. J. Foyt	(United States) Rick Mears	(United States) Al Unser
2	(United States) Bobby Unser	(Brazil) Hélio Castroneves	(United States) Johnny Rutherford
3	(United States) Mario Andretti	(United States) Wilbur Shaw	(United States) Bill Vukovich
4	(Brazil) Emerson Fittipaldi	(United States) Al Unser Jr.	(United States) Louis Meyer
5	(United States) Mauri Rose	(United States) Parnelli Jones	(United States) Gordon Johncock
6	(Netherlands) Arie Luyendyk	(United States) Rodger Ward	(United Kingdom) Jim Clark
7	(United Kingdom) Dario Franchitti	(United States) Tom Sneva	(United States) Bobby Rahal
8	(United States) Mark Donohue	(United States) Michael Andretti	(United States) Ralph DePalma
9	(United States) Ray Harroun	(United States) Tommy Milton	(United States) Danny Sullivan
10	(United Kingdom) Graham Hill	(United States) Dan Gurney	(United States) Jim Rathmann
11	(Colombia) Juan Pablo Montoya	(United States) Tony Bettenhausen Sr.	(New Zealand) Scott Dixon

Non-Indianapolis 500 winner (as of 2011).

== Nominees ==
- Fred Agabashian
- Marco Andretti
- Mario Andretti
- Michael Andretti
- Billy Arnold
- Cliff Bergere
- Gary Bettenhausen
- Tony Bettenhausen Sr.
- Johnny Boyd
- Joe Boyer
- Jimmy Bryan
- Hélio Castroneves
- Eddie Cheever Jr.
- Jim Clark
- Art Cross
- Bill Cummings
- Gil de Ferran
- Ralph DePalma
- Pete DePaolo
- Scott Dixon
- Mark Donohue
- Emerson Fittipaldi
- Pat Flaherty
- A. J. Foyt
- Fred Frame
- Dario Franchitti
- Scott Goodyear
- Robby Gordon
- Jules Goux
- Roberto Guerrero
- Dan Gurney
- Janet Guthrie
- Sam Hanks
- Ray Harroun
- Harry Hartz
- Ralph Hepburn
- Graham Hill
- Bill Holland
- Ted Horn
- Sam Hornish Jr.
- Jim Hurtubise
- Gordon Johncock
- Parnelli Jones
- Tony Kanaan
- Ray Keech
- Mel Kenyon
- Buddy Lazier
- Joe Leonard
- Frank Lockhart
- Arie Luyendyk
- Bobby Marshman
- Rex Mays
- Roger McCluskey
- Jim McElreath
- Jack McGrath
- Rick Mears
- Vítor Meira
- Louis Meyer
- Chet Miller
- Tommy Milton
- Juan Pablo Montoya
- Mike Mosley
- Ralph Mulford
- Jimmy Murphy
- Duke Nalon
- Pat O'Connor
- Barney Oldfield
- Danny Ongais
- Johnnie Parsons
- Danica Patrick
- Bobby Rahal
- Jim Rathmann
- Dario Resta
- Peter Revson
- Mauri Rose
- Lloyd Ruby
- Johnny Rutherford
- Troy Ruttman
- Eddie Sachs
- Wilbur Shaw
- Tom Sneva
- Jimmy Snyder
- George Souders
- Jackie Stewart
- Tony Stewart
- Danny Sullivan
- Bob Sweikert
- René Thomas
- Johnny Thomson
- Paul Tracy
- Al Unser Sr.
- Al Unser Jr.
- Bobby Unser
- Jacques Villeneuve
- Bill Vukovich
- Bill Vukovich II
- Lee Wallard
- Rodger Ward
- Dan Wheldon
- Howdy Wilcox

== Reaction ==
Immediately after the list was released, critical reaction was both positive and negative. There was almost universal acclaim for the three four-time winners being on the front row (Foyt, Unser, Mears). However, there was considerable dissent regarding winners that were not included, bias towards recent years, and the inclusion of non-winners. Due to the limitations of the final list size (33 names), it was not possible for all 68 former winners to be included. Also, significant non-winners such as Rex Mays and Ted Horn were not included in the final grid.

There were several dissents early on among fans and media regarding drivers included on the original list of 100 finalists, such as Danica Patrick and Marco Andretti. However, none of the highly controversial nominees made the final official list. Dan Wheldon (who at the time of voting had won only once) won the race for the second time just days after the list was released. Along with four other top-4 career finishes, and three front row starts, considerable speculation afterwards suggested Wheldon would have easily made the list had the voting been conducted after the race.

After the official announcement, merchandise including T-shirts and other collectibles, were marketed in The Greatest 33 theme.

== Gallery ==
The top three vote-getters consisted of the three four-time Indianapolis 500 winners.

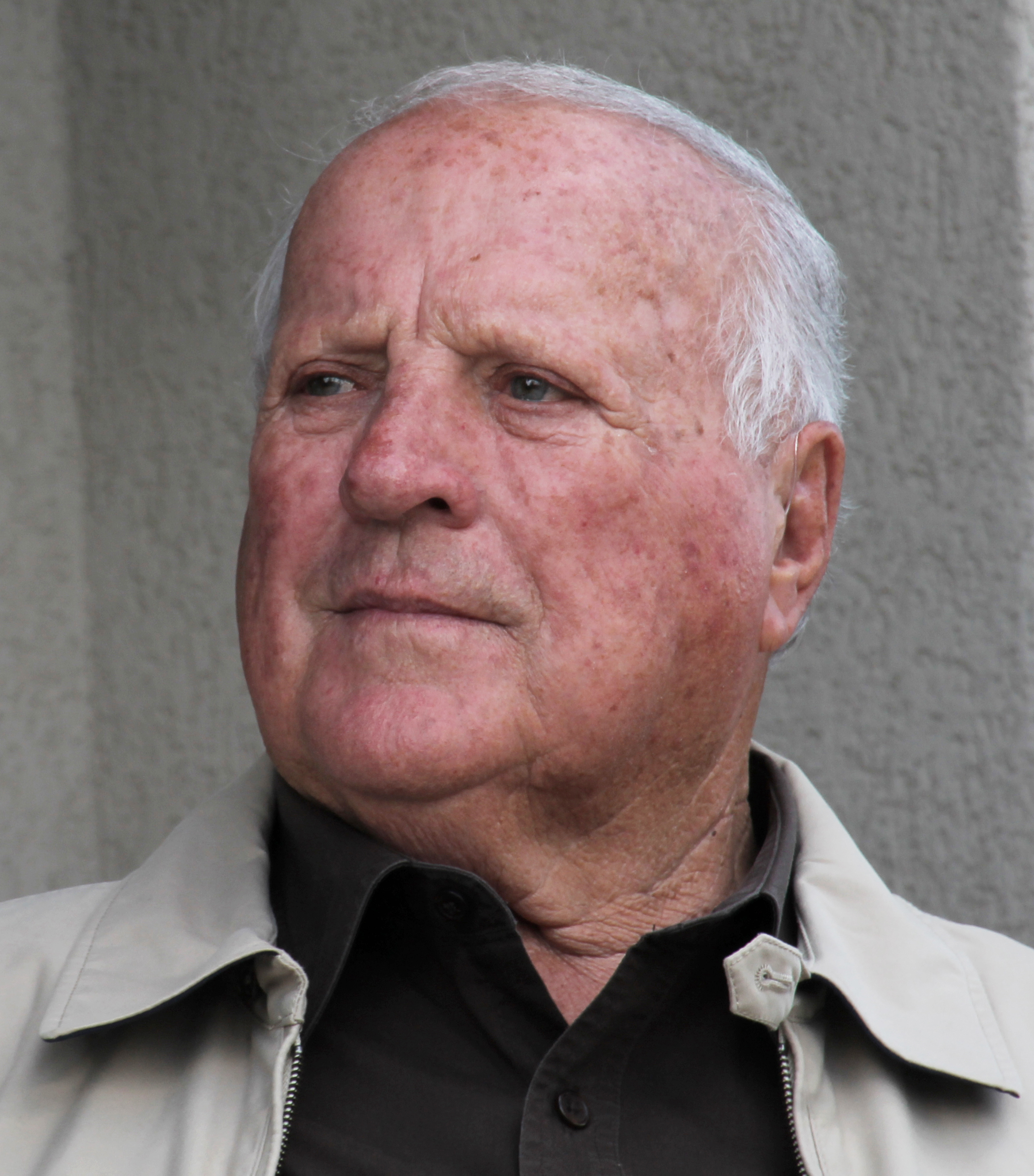
A. J. Foyt

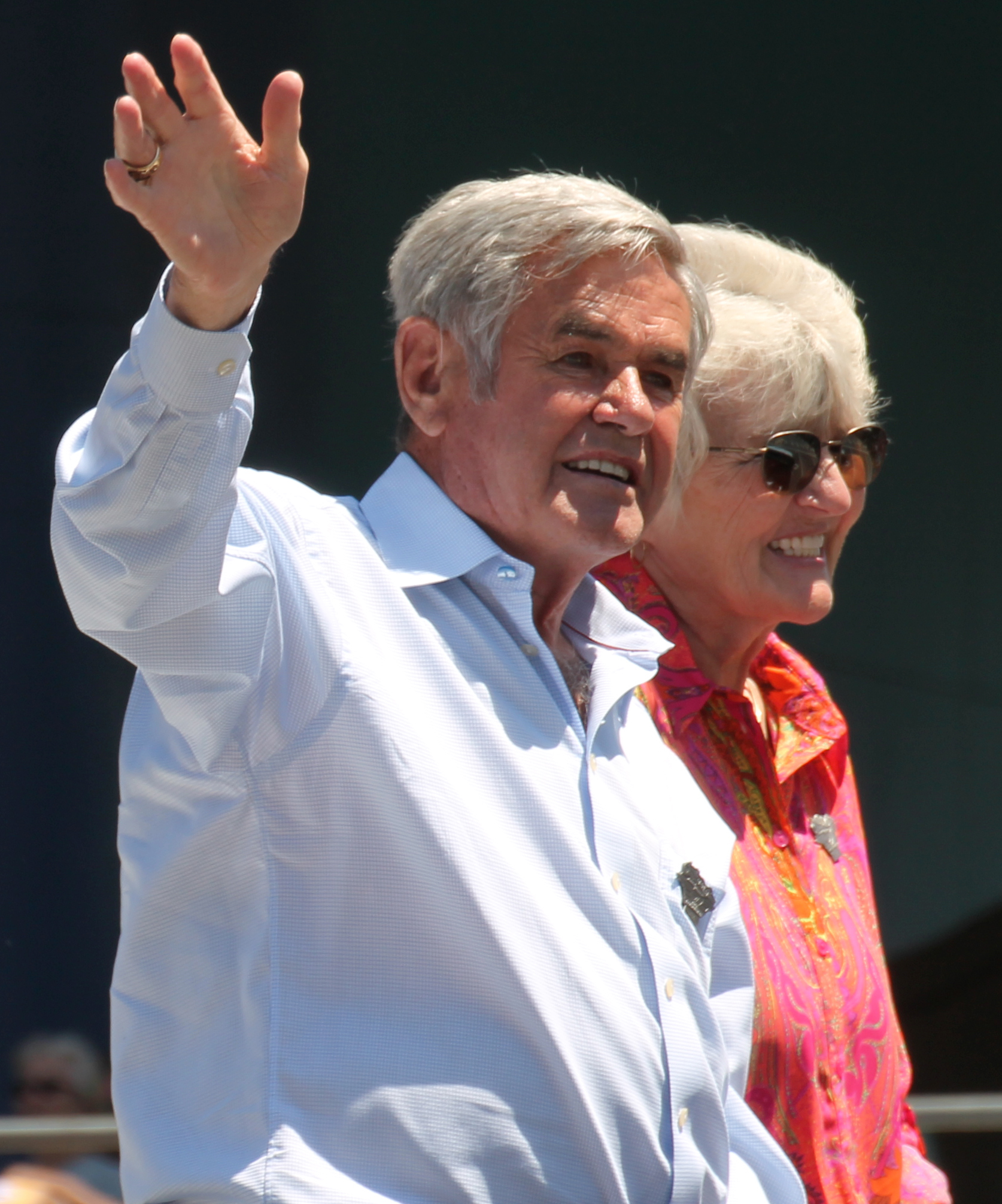
Al Unser Sr.

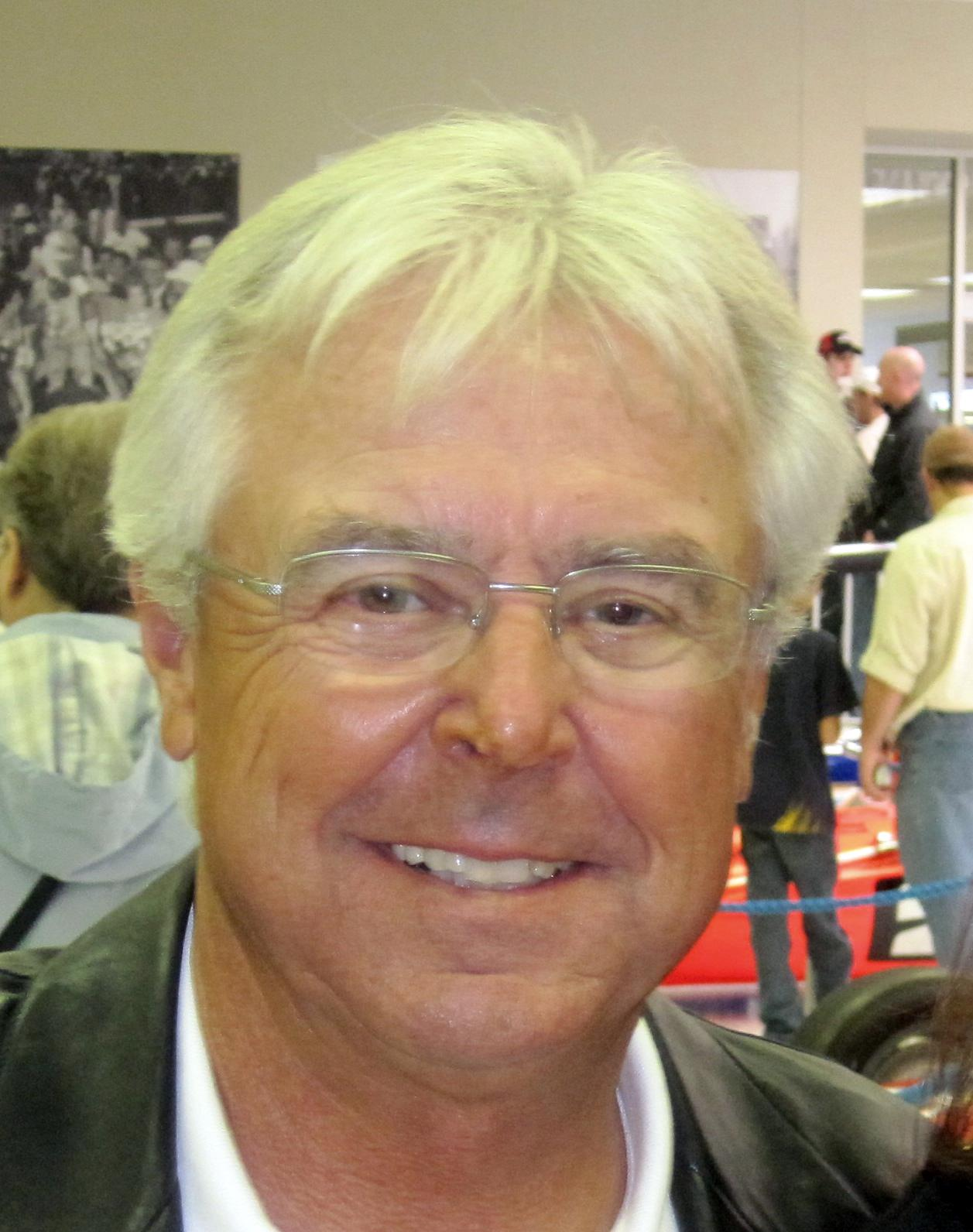
Rick Mears
