= 1966 Langhorne 100 =

American auto race

Race details
- 5th round of the 1966 USAC Championship Car season
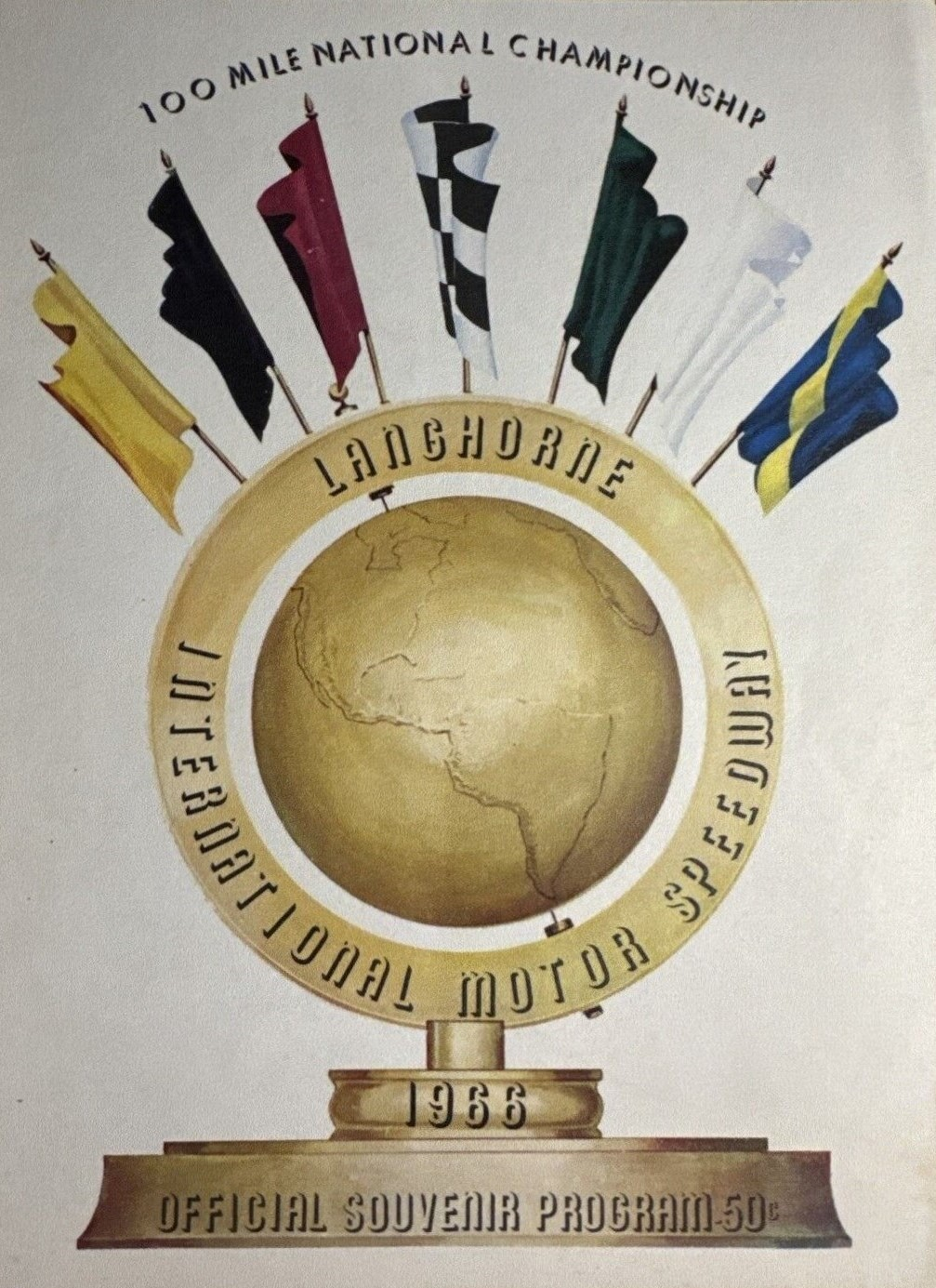
- Date: June 12, 1966
- Location: Langhorne Speedway; Langhorne, Pennsylvania
- Course: Permanent racing facility 1 mi / 1.609 km
- Distance: 100 laps 100 mi / km

Pole position
- Driver: Mario Andretti

Podium
- First: Mario Andretti
- Second: Jim McElreath
- Third: Joe Leonard

The 1966 Langhorne 100 was the fifth round of the 1966 USAC Championship Car season, held on June 12, 1966, at the 1-mile (1.6 km) Langhorne Speedway, near Langhorne, Pennsylvania.

== Summary ==
Mario Andretti took the pole; Don Branson qualified second in a sprint car (which he claimed was much easier to handle on this track).

Andretti held the lead after getting the green flag, pulling away from Branson. Gary Congdon moved into third. By the second lap, Andretti was 8 car lengths ahead of Branson and Congdon. Jim McElreath who had started 11th, worked his way to sixth position during the early stages of the race. On lap 26, George Snider and Art Pollard spun out, hitting the outside wall. After the ensuing caution ended Andretti once again distanced himself from the field.

Midway through the race, McElreath passed Joe Leonard for third. Andretti by this time held a half lap lead. McElreath soon passed Branson for second. On lap 55, Congdon, who had been running third, dropped out with gearbox failure. On the following lap, Gordon Johncock dropped out with universal joint issues. Jim Hurtubise passed Branson, moving into third. On lap 65, Bud Tingelstad dropped out with engine failure. On lap 71, Hurtubise spun out, smashing into the infield fence. This brought out a second caution period.

On the restart Al Unser moved into third, passing Leonard. Andretti pulled out a two-second lead over McElreath. On lap 78, Ronnie Duman spun; Bob Hurt, attempting to evade the stranded Duman, hit the wall, ending his race. Duman was able to continue. The accident brought out the third yellow. On the restart, Andretti once again quickly distanced himself from McElreath. On lap 89 Bobby Unser dropped out with engine failure.Sam Sessions spun out in oil left behind by Unser, bringing out a fourth and final yellow. The white flag was presented along with the yellow as the cars completed the final lap. Andretti took the checkered, completing the race in one hour. Win the victory, Andretti moved into third in USAC standings.

== Results ==
Place	Name	Sponsor	Chass.	Laps	Points
1	(United States) Mario Andretti	Dean Van Lines	Ford	100	200
2	(United States) Jim McElreath	John Zink	Ford	100	160
3	(United States) Joe Leonard	Yamaha	Ford	100	140
