= 1966 USAC Championship Car season =

Sports season

- USAC National Championship Trail

Season
- Races: 16
- Start date: March 20
- End date: November 20

Awards
- National champion: (United States) Mario Andretti
- Indianapolis 500 winner: (United Kingdom) Graham Hill

The 1966 USAC Championship Car season consisted of 16 races, beginning in Avondale, Arizona on March 20 and concluding at the same location on November 20. There was also one non-championship event at Fuji Speedway in Japan. The USAC National Champion was Mario Andretti, and the Indianapolis 500 winner was Graham Hill. At Indianapolis, Chuck Rodee was killed while qualifying for the 1966 Indianapolis 500. Also of note was the end of the career of two-time 500 and two-time National Champion Rodger Ward as he ran the final three races of his IndyCar career at the start of the season which included the final IndyCar victory of his career at Trenton.

== Schedule and results ==
| Rnd | Date | Race name | Track | Location | Type | Pole position | Winning driver |
|---|---|---|---|---|---|---|---|
| 1 | March 20 | (United States) Jimmy Bryan Memorial | Phoenix International Raceway | Avondale, Arizona | Paved | (United States) Mario Andretti | (United States) Jim McElreath |
| 2 | April 24 | (United States) Trenton 150 | Trenton International Speedway | Trenton, New Jersey | Paved | (United States) Mario Andretti | (United States) Rodger Ward |
| 3 | May 30 | (United States) International 500 Mile Sweepstakes | Indianapolis Motor Speedway | Speedway, Indiana | Paved | (United States) Mario Andretti | (United Kingdom) Graham Hill |
| 4 | June 5 | (United States) Rex Mays Classic | Milwaukee Mile | West Allis, Wisconsin | Paved | (United States) Mario Andretti | (United States) Mario Andretti |
| 5 | June 12 | (United States) Langhorne 100 | Langhorne Speedway | Langhorne, Pennsylvania | Paved | (United States) Mario Andretti | (United States) Mario Andretti |
| 6 | June 26 | (United States) Atlanta 300 | Atlanta Motor Speedway | Hampton, Georgia | Paved | (United States) Mario Andretti | (United States) Mario Andretti |
| 7 | July 4 | (United States) Pikes Peak Auto Hill Climb | Pikes Peak Highway | Pikes Peak, Colorado | Hill | (United States) Bobby Unser^{A} | (United States) Bobby Unser |
| 8 | July 24 | (United States) Hoosier Grand Prix | Indianapolis Raceway Park | Clermont, Indiana | Road | (United States) Lloyd Ruby | (United States) Mario Andretti |
| 9 | August 7 | (United States) Langhorne 150 | Langhorne Speedway | Langhorne, Pennsylvania | Paved | (United States) Don Branson | (United States) Roger McCluskey |
| 10 | August 20 | (United States) Tony Bettenhausen Memorial | Illinois State Fairgrounds | Springfield, Illinois | Dirt | (United States) Don Branson | (United States) Don Branson |
| 11 | August 27 | (United States) Tony Bettenhausen 200 | Milwaukee Mile | West Allis, Wisconsin | Paved | (United States) Mario Andretti | (United States) Mario Andretti |
| 12 | September 5 | (United States) Ted Horn Memorial | DuQuoin State Fairgrounds | Du Quoin, Illinois | Dirt | (United States) Bobby Unser | (United States) Bud Tingelstad |
| 13 | September 10 | (United States) Hoosier Hundred | Indiana State Fairgrounds | Indianapolis, Indiana | Dirt | (United States) A. J. Foyt | (United States) Mario Andretti |
| 14 | September 25 | (United States) Trenton 200 | Trenton International Speedway | Trenton, New Jersey | Paved | (United States) Mario Andretti | (United States) Mario Andretti |
| NC | October 9 | (Japan) Fuji Race | Fuji Speedway | Oyama, Japan | Road | (United Kingdom) Jackie Stewart | (United Kingdom) Jackie Stewart |
| 15 | October 23 | (United States) Golden State 100 | California State Fairgrounds | Sacramento, California | Dirt | (United States) Don Branson | (United States) Dick Atkins |
| 16 | November 19 | (United States) Bobby Ball Memorial | Phoenix International Raceway | Avondale, Arizona | Paved | (United States) Mario Andretti | (United States) Mario Andretti |

Paved/Dirt Oval
Road Course/Hill Climb
Non-championship race

^A No pole is awarded for the Pikes Peak Hill Climb, in this schedule on the pole is the driver who started first. No lap led was awarded for the Pikes Peak Hill Climb, however, a lap was awarded to the drivers that completed the climb.

== Final points standings ==
Note: Jerry Grant, Dan Gurney, Jim Clark, Jackie Stewart, Graham Hill, Peter Revson and Cale Yarborough are not eligible for points.

| Pos | Driver | PHX1 (United States) | TRE1 (United States) | INDY (United States) | MIL1 (United States) | LHS (United States) | ATL (United States) | PIK (United States) | IRP (United States) | LAN (United States) | SPR (United States) | MIL2 (United States) | DQSF (United States) | ISF (United States) | TRE2 (United States) | FUJ (Japan) | CSF (United States) | PHX2 (United States) | Pts |
|---|---|---|---|---|---|---|---|---|---|---|---|---|---|---|---|---|---|---|---|
| 1 | (United States) Mario Andretti | **15** | **4** | **18** | **1** | **1** | **1** | | 1 | 21 | 2 | **1** | 15 | 1 | **1** | DNS | 10 | **1** | 3070 |
| 2 | (United States) Jim McElreath | 1 | 3 | 3 | 21 | 2 | 12 | | 3 | 22 | 11 | 4 | 10 | 10 | 6 | 17 | 7 | 3 | 2430 |
| 3 | (United States) Gordon Johncock | 9 | 2 | 4 | DNQ | 19 | 3 | | 5 | 2 | | 2 | | | 12 | DNS | | DNQ | 2050 |
| 4 | (United States) Joe Leonard | 14 | | 9 | 3 | 3 | 21 | | 8 | Wth | 4 | 3 | 4 | DNQ | DNQ | | | 5 | 1275 |
| 5 | (United States) Al Unser | 20 | | 12 | 6 | 9 | 16 | | 2 | 3 | | 20 | | | 2 | DNS | 18 | 2 | 1260 |
| 6 | (United States) Bobby Unser | 19 | 18 | 8 | 16 | 14 | 14 | **1** | 4 | 19 | 5 | 8 | **3** | 17 | DNQ | 2 | 5 | 4 | 1210 |
| 7 | (United States) Don Branson | 16 | 10 | 23 | 15 | 4 | 6 | | 9 | **5** | **1** | 23 | 6 | 4 | 23 | | **4** | | 1135 |
| 8 | (United States) Chuck Hulse | 3 | DNQ | 20 | 5 | 12 | 4 | | 18 | 7 | 18 | 21 | 16 | 5 | 13 | 11 | 2 | DNQ | 1030 |
| 9 | (Canada) Billy Foster | 7 | 22 | 24 | DNQ | 5 | 2 | | 13 | 20 | | 5 | 9 | 15 | 18 | 9 | DNQ | 12 | 930 |
| 10 | (United States) Bud Tingelstad | 4 | 5 | 21 | 12 | 18 | 28 | | 17 | 6 | 7 | 11 | 1 | 7 | 14 | 20 | 8 | 25 | 870 |
| 11 | (United States) Dick Atkins | 22 | | DNQ | 20 | DNQ | 23 | | 10 | 9 | 12 | 12 | 2 | 6 | 4 | DNS | 1 | | 815 |
| 12 | (United States) Roger McCluskey | | 20 | 13 | 2 | 6 | 27 | | 22 | 1 | 14 | 18 | 18 | 14 | 5 | | DNS | 11 | 780 |
| 13 | (United States) A. J. Foyt | 11 | 15 | 26 | Wth | | 29 | | 24 | Wth | 3 | 24 | 7 | **2** | 3 | | 17 | 17 | 775 |
| 14 | (United States) Mel Kenyon | | | 5 | 7 | | | | | | | 22 | | | DNP | | | 23 | 560 |
| 15 | (United States) Rodger Ward | 2 | 1 | 15 | | | | | | | | | | | | | | | 540 |
| 16 | (United States) Al Smith RY | | | | | | 5 | | DNQ | 17 | | 25 | | | 7 | | | 13 | 420 |
| 17 | (United States) Gary Congdon | 17 | 13 | 25 | 9 | 20 | 24 | | 20 | 4 | 15 | 6 | 12 | DNQ | 15 | 4 | 14 | 15 | 390 |
| 18 | (United States) Arnie Knepper | | 19 | 29 | 14 | 8 | 8 | | 21 | 12 | DNQ | DNQ | 11 | 3 | 21 | 3 | 13 | 21 | 375 |
| 19 | (United States) George Snider | 6 | | 19 | 10 | 21 | DNQ | | 6 | 11 | 6 | 10 | DNQ | 12 | DNP | | 11 | | 365 |
| 20 | (United States) Lloyd Ruby | 12 | 21 | 11 | DNP | | | | **16** | 24 | | 9 | | | 22 | 12 | | 6 | 355 |
| 21 | (United States) Larry Dickson | | 11 | 32 | 13 | 11 | 19 | | DNQ | DNQ | 9 | 17 | 8 | 9 | 20 | 6 | 3 | DNQ | 320 |
| 22 | (United States) Eddie Johnson | | | 7 | | | | | | | | | | | | | | | 300 |
| 23 | (United States) Art Pollard | | | DNQ | 4 | 22 | 22 | | DNQ | 23 | | 7 | | | | DNS | 9 | 22 | 280 |
| 24 | (United States) Bobby Grim | | 7 | 31 | 8 | DNQ | 13 | | 12 | | | 13 | | | 25 | 8 | | 7 | 275 |
| 25 | (United States) Ralph Liguori | | | | | | | | DNQ | 10 | 8 | | 5 | 16 | 10 | | 16 | 26 | 260 |
| 26 | (United States) Carl Williams | 5 | 14 | 16 | DNQ | 10 | 15 | | 19 | 15 | 10 | DNQ | 17 | 13 | DNQ | 21 | 15 | 18 | 210 |
| 27 | (United States) Sam Sessions | | 9 | DNQ | DNQ | 15 | 9 | | 11 | DNQ | | DNQ | | | 24 | 18 | | | 210 |
| 28 | (United States) Al Miller | | | 30 | | | 10 | | 15 | 14 | | 19 | 14 | 11 | 9 | 19 | | DNQ | 190 |
| 29 | (United States) Greg Weld | | | DNQ | | | DNQ | | | | | 14 | | | 8 | 16 | 6 | 14 | 180 |
| 30 | (United States) Johnny Boyd | | | 22 | DNQ | | 7 | | 23 | | | | | | | | | | 180 |
| 31 | (United States) Ron Lux R | | 6 | DNQ | 11 | | 18 | | | | | | | | | | | | 140 |
| 32 | (United States) Ronnie Duman | | 16 | 33 | DNQ | 13 | 17 | | 7 | 16 | 17 | DNQ | | 8 | 26 | 22 | DNQ | DNQ | 140 |
| 33 | (United States) Bob Harkey | | | DNQ | DNQ | 7 | 20 | | 14 | 8 | 13 | 16 | | | 19 | DNS | | DNQ | 135 |
| 34 | (United States) Bruce Jacobi | | | DNQ | 19 | DNQ | 25 | | DNP | 18 | | | | | | | DNQ | 8 | 100 |
| 35 | (United States) Wes Vandervoort | | | | | | | 2 | | | | | | | | | | | 80 |
| 36 | (United States) Norm Brown R | | | | | | | | | | | | | | | | | 9 | 80 |
| 37 | (United States) Bob Hurt | | 8 | DNQ | 17 | 16 | | | | | | | | | 16 | | | | 75 |
| 38 | (United States) Bob Mathouser | 8 | | DNQ | | | | | | | | | | | | | | | 75 |
| 39 | (United States) Paul Kleinschmidt | | | | | | | 3 | | | | | | | | | | | 70 |
| 40 | (United States) Ted Foltz | | | | | | | 4 | | | | | | | | | | | 60 |
| 41 | (United States) Parnelli Jones | | | 14 | DNS | | | | | | | | | | | | | 10 | 60 |
| 42 | (United States) Chuck Arnold | | | | | | 11 | | | DNQ | DNQ | | | | | | | | 60 |
| 43 | (United States) Orville Nance | | | | | | | 5 | | | | | | | | | | | 50 |
| 44 | (United States) John Hollansworth R | 10 | 17 | | DNQ | DNQ | DNQ | 13 | | DNQ | DNQ | | | | | 13 | | DNQ | 45 |
| 45 | (United States) Clyde McFarlin | | | | | | | 6 | | | | | | | | | | | 40 |
| 46 | (United States) Wally Dallenbach Sr. | | | | | | DNQ | | | 13 | | 15 | | | 11 | DNS | | 24 | 40 |
| 47 | (United States) Grier Manning | | | | | | | 7 | | | | | | | | | | | 30 |
| 48 | (United States) Jack Hahn | | | | | | | 8 | | | | | | | | | | | 25 |
| 49 | (United States) Rick Vermillion | | | | | | | 9 | | | | | | | | | | | 20 |
| 50 | (United States) Don Anderson R | | | | | | | 10 | | | | | | | | | | | 15 |
| 51 | (United States) Red Riegel | | 12 | DNQ | DNQ | | | | | | | | | | | | | | 15 |
| 52 | (United States) Bob Lacy R | | | | | | | 11 | | | | | | | | | | | 10 |
| 53 | (United States) Bob Tattersall | | | DNQ | | | | | | | 16 | | 13 | 18 | | | 12 | DNQ | 5 |
| 54 | (United States) Clark Yowell | | | | | | | 12 | | | | | | | | | | | 5 |
| – | (United Kingdom) Graham Hill R | | | 1 | | | | | | | | | | | | 5 | | | 0 |
| – | (United Kingdom) Jim Clark | | | 2 | | | | | | | | | | | | DNS | | | 0 |
| – | (United Kingdom) Jackie Stewart R | | | 6 | | | | | | | | | | | | **1** | | | 0 |
| – | (United States) Jerry Grant | | | 10 | | | | | | | | | | | | 10 | | 20 | 0 |
| – | (United States) Jim Hurtubise | 13 | | 17 | 22 | 17 | 26 | | | | DNQ | 26 | | | 17 | 15 | | DNQ | 0 |
| – | (United States) Bob Daly | | | | | | | 14 | | | | | | | | | | | 0 |
| – | (United States) Butch Hardman R | | | | | | | 15 | | | | | | | | | | | 0 |
| – | (United States) Malcolm Brazier | | | | | | | 16 | | | | | | | | | | | 0 |
| – | (United States) Peter Revson R | | | | | | | | | | | | | | | | | 16 | 0 |
| – | (United States) Bob Werner | | | | | | | 17 | | | | | | | | | | | 0 |
| – | (United States) Gig Stephens | | DNQ | DNP | 18 | DNQ | DNQ | | | DNQ | | | | | DNQ | | | | 0 |
| – | (United States) Johnny Rutherford | 18 | | DNP | | | | | | | | | | | | | | | 0 |
| – | (United States) Paul Wigton R | | | | | | | 18 | | | | | | | | | | | 0 |
| – | (United States) Gary Bettenhausen R | DNQ | DNQ | DNP | DNQ | DNQ | DNQ | | DNQ | DNQ | DNQ | DNQ | | DNQ | DNQ | | DNQ | 19 | 0 |
| – | (United States) Walter Miller | | | | | | | 19 | | | | | | | | | | | 0 |
| – | (United States) Mike McGreevy | 21 | DNQ | DNQ | | | | | | | | | | | | | | | 0 |
| – | (United States) Dee Jones | 23 | | | | | | | | | | | | | | | | | 0 |
| – | (United States) Dan Gurney | | | 27 | | | | | | | | | | | | | | | 0 |
| – | (United States) Cale Yarborough R | | | 28 | | | | | DNQ | DNQ | | | | | | | | | 0 |
| – | (United States) Tommy Copp | | | | | | 30 | | | | | | | | | | | | 0 |
| – | (United States) Bob Herring | | | | | | | DNS | | | | | | | | | | | 0 |
| – | (United States) Gordon Sullivan | | | | | | | | | | | | | | | | DNS | | 0 |
| – | (United States) Bob King | | DNQ | | | DNQ | | | DNP | DNQ | DNQ | | | DNQ | | | | | 0 |
| – | (United States) Ray Duckworth | | | | | | DNQ | | DNQ | DNQ | | | DNQ | | DNQ | | | | 0 |
| – | (United States) Don Meacham | | | DNQ | DNQ | | | | | | | | | | | | DNQ | DNQ | 0 |
| – | (United States) Dave Paul | | | DNQ | | DNQ | DNQ | | | | | | | | | | | | 0 |
| – | (United States) Skip Hedrick | | | | | | | | DNQ | | | DNQ | | | | | | DNQ | 0 |
| – | (United States) Bill Cheesbourg | DNP | | DNQ | DNP | | | | | | | | | | | 7 | | DNQ | 0 |
| – | (United States) Dick Fries | | | DNP | DNQ | DNQ | | | | | | | | | | | | | 0 |
| – | (United States) Hal Minyard | | | DNQ | DNQ | | | | | | | | | | | | | | 0 |
| – | (United States) Dempsey Wilson | | | DNQ | DNQ | | | | | | | | | | | | | | 0 |
| – | (United States) Bud Randall | | | | | | | | | | DNQ | | DNQ | | | | | | 0 |
| – | (United States) Bob Wente | | | DNQ | | | | | | | | | | | | DNS | | DNQ | 0 |
| – | (United States) Jud Larson | | DNQ | DNP | | | | | | | | | | | | | | | 0 |
| – | (United States) Dick Guldstrand | | | DNP | | | DNQ | | | | | | | | | | | | 0 |
| – | (United States) Ronnie Bucknum | | | DNQ | | | | | | | | | | | | | | | 0 |
| – | (United States) Masten Gregory | | | DNQ | | | | | | | | | | | | | | | 0 |
| – | (United States) Bobby Johns | | | DNQ | | | | | | | | | | | | | | | 0 |
| – | (United States) Art Malone | | | DNQ | | | | | | | | | | | | | | | 0 |
| – | (United States) Chuck Rodee | | | DNQ | | | | | | | | | | | | | | | 0 |
| – | (United States) Chuck Stevenson | | | DNQ | | | | | | | | | | | | | | | 0 |
| – | (United States) Bob Veith | | | DNQ | | | | | | | | | | | | | | | 0 |
| – | (United States) LeeRoy Yarbrough | | | DNQ | | | | | | | | | | | | | | | 0 |
| – | (United States) Bay Darnell | | | | | DNQ | | | | | | | | | | | | | 0 |
| – | (United States) Leo Caldwell | | | | | | DNQ | | | | | | | | | | | | 0 |
| – | (United States) George Landry | | | | | | | | DNQ | | | | | | | | | | 0 |
| – | (United States) Chuck Booth | | | | | | | | | | | | | | | | DNQ | | 0 |
| – | (United States) Jim Adams | | | DNP | | | | | | | | | | | | | | | 0 |
| – | (United States) Jack Conely | | | DNP | | | | | | | | | | | | | | | 0 |
| – | (United States) Ebb Rose | | | DNP | | | | | | | | | | | | | | | 0 |
| – | (United States) Billy Wilkerson | | | DNP | | | | | | | | | | | | | | | 0 |
| – | (United States) Bob Pratt | | | | | | | | DNP | | | | | | | | | | 0 |
| – | (New Zealand) Chris Amon | | | | | | | | | | | | | | | 14 | | | 0 |
| – | (United States) Rick Muther | | | | | | | | | | | | | | | DNS | | | 0 |
| Pos | Driver | PHX1 (United States) | TRE1 (United States) | INDY (United States) | MIL1 (United States) | LHS (United States) | ATL (United States) | PIK (United States) | IRP (United States) | LAN (United States) | SPR (United States) | MIL2 (United States) | DQSF (United States) | ISF (United States) | TRE2 (United States) | FUJ (Japan) | CSF (United States) | PHX2 (United States) | Pts |

| Color | Result |
|---|---|
| Gold | Winner |
| Silver | 2nd place |
| Bronze | 3rd place |
| Green | 4th & 5th place |
| Light Blue | 6th-10th place |
| Dark Blue | Finished (Outside Top 10) |
| Purple | Did not finish (Ret) |
| Red | Did not qualify (DNQ) |
| Brown | Withdrawn (Wth) |
| Black | Disqualified (DSQ) |
| White | Did not start (DNS) |
| Blank | Did not participate (DNP) |
| Blank | Not competing |

**In-line notation**
| **Bold** | Pole position |
| Italics | Ran fastest race lap |
| * | Led most race laps |
RY Rookie of the Year
R Rookie

== See also ==
- 1966 Indianapolis 500
