= 1966 Indianapolis 500 =

American motor race

50th Indianapolis 500
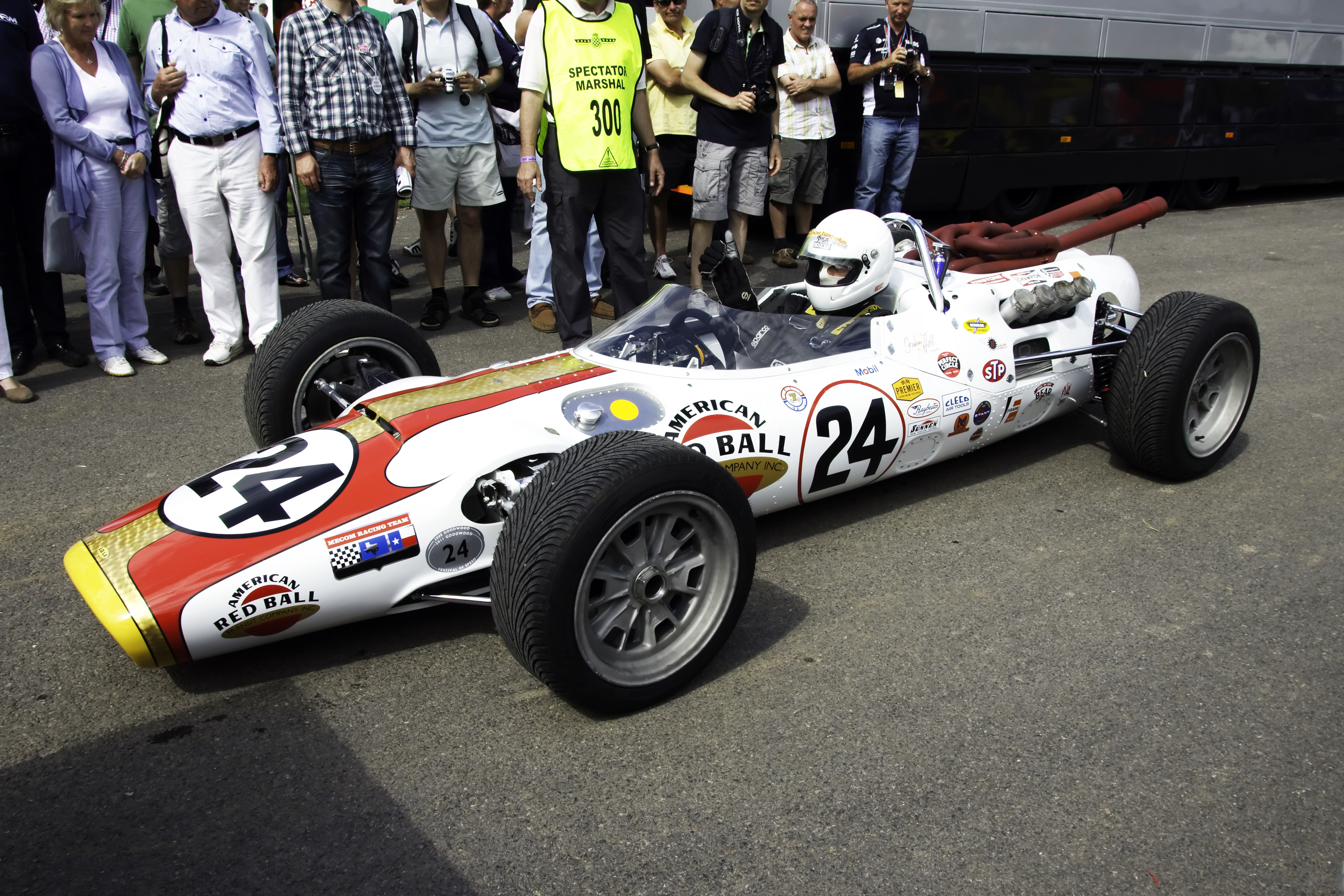

Indianapolis Motor Speedway

Indianapolis 500
- Sanctioning body: USAC
- Season: 1966 USAC season
- Date: May 30, 1966
- Winner: Graham Hill
- Winning team: John Mecom, Jr.
- Winning Chief Mechanic: George Bignotti
- Time of race: 3:27:52.53
- Average speed: 144.317 mph (232.256 km/h)
- Pole position: Mario Andretti
- Pole speed: 165.899 mph (266.989 km/h)
- Fastest qualifier: Mario Andretti
- Rookie of the Year: Jackie Stewart
- Most laps led: Lloyd Ruby (68)

Pre-race ceremonies
- National anthem: Purdue Band
- "Back Home Again in Indiana": Ed Ames
- Starting command: Tony Hulman
- Pace car: Mercury Comet Cyclone GT
- Pace car driver: Benson Ford
- Starter: Pat Vidan
- Honorary referee: Raymond Firestone
- Estimated attendance: 275,000

Television in the United States
- Network: ABC's Wide World of Sports
- Announcers: Chris Schenkel & Rodger Ward

Chronology
Previous	Next
1965	1967

The 50th International 500-Mile Sweepstakes was held at the Indianapolis Motor Speedway in Speedway, Indiana on Monday, May 30, 1966. The official program cover for the race celebrated both the 50th running of the race, and 150th anniversary of Indiana statehood.

Eleven of the 33 starters were eliminated in a first-lap accident right after receiving the green flag on the main stretch. Only A. J. Foyt was injured, hurting his hand scaling the catch fence trying to escape the wreck scene. Only seven cars, the fewest finishers ever, were still running by the end of the race. First-time starter Jackie Stewart led by over a lap late in the race in John Mecom's Lola T90-Ford. However, inside ten laps to go, his oil pressure dropped too low due to a broken scavenge pump. Stewart parked the car, and after briefly attempting to push some ways, he walked back to the pits. Fellow first-time starter Graham Hill inherited the lead and led a total of 10 laps to win, the first rookie winner since 1927. Despite parking his car, Stewart was voted the rookie of the year over Hill, completing enough laps to finish in 6th place.

Defending race winner Jim Clark spun twice during the race, and finished second. A mild controversy developed at the conclusion of the race, as Clark's crew - and some observers - erroneously believed their car was the race winner over Hill. However, during post-race review, the scoring serials were settled later that evening, confirming Hill the race winner and Clark placing second. For the second year in a row, the Wood Brothers from the NASCAR Grand National circuit were invited to work pit stops, this time for Dan Gurney. However, the car dropped out of the race in the crash on the opening lap.

== Race schedule ==
Race schedule – April/May 1966
Sun	Mon	Tue	Wed	Thu	Fri	Sat
24; Trenton	25	26	27	28	29	30; Practice
1 Practice	2 Practice	3 Practice	4 Practice	5 Practice	6 Practice	7 Practice
8 Practice	9 Practice	10; Practice	11; Practice	12; Practice	13; Practice	14; Time Trials
15; Time Trials	16; Practice	17; Practice	18; Practice	19; Practice	20; Practice	21; Time Trials
22; Bump Day	23	24	25	26	27; Carb Day	28
29; Parade	30; Indy 500	31				

Color	Notes
Green	Practice
Dark Blue	Time trials
Silver	Race day
Red	Rained out*
Blank	No track activity

* Includes days where track
activity was significantly
limited due to rain

== Practice and time trials ==
=== Background ===
Three-year veteran Johnny Rutherford was injured in a serious crash on April 3 at Eldora, and was forced to sit out the 1966 race.

The Mecom Racing Team was scheduled to field drivers Walt Hansgen, Rodger Ward, and Jackie Stewart. However, Hansgen died from injuries suffered in a crash during a test session at Le Mans on April 3. Graham Hill was named as a late replacement, and his name was not even listed on the entry list in the official program.

=== Practice ===
Practice for the "Golden Anniversary 500" opened on Saturday April 30, but cold temperatures and rainy weather for the first few days kept most cars off the track. Chuck Hulse (149.8 mph) was the fastest car over the first weekend. On Monday May 2, Art Pollard became the first rookie to pass the 145 mph rookie test. Jackie Stewart also passed his rookie test.

On Tuesday May 10, Mario Andretti turned a practice lap of 164.5 mph during practice, establishing himself as an early favorite for the pole position. Among the others over the 160 mph mark were A. J. Foyt, George Snider, and Dan Gurney.

Rain washed out practice on Wednesday May 11.

On Friday May 13, the final day of practice before time trials, Mario Andretti shattered the unofficial track record by more than 5 mph, running a lap of 167.411 mph. Rain hampered most of the day, but Andretti put together additional laps of 166 mph, and 164 mph. The next-fastest car was Jim Clark, whose best lap was 165.7 mph.

=== Saturday May 14 – Pole Day time trials ===
Mario Andretti won the pole position with a four-lap track record of 165.889 mph. His best single lap was a record 166.328 mph.

Chuck Rodee was killed in a crash. On his second warmup lap in turn one, Rodee backed into the outside wall, and he died of his injuries at the hospital.

A total of 18 cars completed qualifying runs on a chilly pole day.

=== Sunday May 15 – Second Day Time trials ===
After crashing on pole day, A. J. Foyt qualified at 161.355 mph, the fourth-fastest car in the field.

=== Saturday May 21 – Third Day Time trials ===
Unser brothers Bobby and Al qualified, with Al (162.272 mph) leading the speeds for the day. Bobby Grim qualified his turbo Offy front-engined roadster at 158.367 mph, the only such car in the field.

=== Sunday May 22 – Bump Day Time trials ===
Two drivers managed to bump their way into the field, Ronnie Duman and Larry Dickson. Greg Weld wrecked two cars (one of which was a popular Granatelli-Novi), but was uninjured. Bobby Grim, the slowest qualifier, holds on to the make the field in his front-engined roadster.

== Starting grid ==
Row	Inside	Middle	Outside
1	(United States) Mario Andretti	(United Kingdom) Jim Clark W	(United States) George Snider
2	(United States) Parnelli Jones W	(United States) Lloyd Ruby	(United States) Gordon Johncock
3	(United States) Jim McElreath	(United States) Chuck Hulse	(United States) Don Branson
4	(United States) Jerry Grant	(United Kingdom) Jackie Stewart R	(Canada) Billy Foster
5	(United States) Rodger Ward W	(United States) Johnny Boyd	(United Kingdom) Graham Hill R
6	(United States) Gary Congdon R	(United States) Mel Kenyon R	(United States) A. J. Foyt W
7	(United States) Dan Gurney	(United States) Joe Leonard	(United States) Roger McCluskey
8	(United States) Jim Hurtubise	(United States) Al Unser	(United States) Cale Yarborough R
9	(United States) Carl Williams R	(United States) Arnie Knepper	(United States) Bud Tingelstad
10	(United States) Bobby Unser	(United States) Eddie Johnson	(United States) Al Miller
11	(United States) Bobby Grim	(United States) Larry Dickson R	(United States) Ronnie Duman

R Indianapolis 500 rookie
W Indianapolis 500 winner

Yellow indicates the driver was eliminated in the first lap accident.

Tan indicated the driver was involved in the first lap accident, but was able to restart the race.

=== Alternates ===
- First alternate: Dick Atkins R (#97)

=== Failed to qualify ===
- Jim Adams R – Entry declined, lack of experience
- Gary Bettenhausen (#61) R – Entry declined, lack of experience
- Ronnie Bucknum R (#68)
- Bill Cheesbourg (#79, #99)
- Jack Conely (#89) R – Did not appear/failed engine in practice
- Dick Fries R – Entry declined, lack of experience
- Masten Gregory (#63, #78)
- Dick Guldstrand R – Entry declined, lack of experience
- Bob Harkey (#85)
- Bob Hurt R (#36)
- Bruce Jacobi R (#68)
- Bobby Johns (#41)
- Jud Larson – Did not appear
- Ron Lux R (#55)
- Art Malone (#32)
- Bob Mathouser (#96)
- Mike McGreevey R (#85)
- Hal Minyard R (#44)
- Dave Paul R
- Art Pollard R (#44)
- Red Riegel R (#87)
- Chuck Rodee (#92) – Fatal accident
- Ebb Rose – Did not appear
- Johnny Rutherford (#92) – Withdrew, injured
- Sammy Sessions R (#38)
- Gig Stephens R (#71) – Did not appear
- Chuck Stevenson (#11)
- Bob Tattersall R (#61)
- Bob Veith (#67)
- Greg Weld R (#15, #76)
- Bob Wente (#65, #85)
- Billy Wilkerson R – Entry declined, lack of experience
- Dempsey Wilson (#51)
- LeeRoy Yarbrough R (#76)

== Race recap ==
=== Start ===
As the field came down the main stretch for the start, Billy Foster was among those jockeying for position. As the green flag fell, he nearly touched wheels with Gordon Johncock and lost control. He spun directly into the outside wall, just beyond the start/finish line, and triggered a huge pileup. Sixteen cars were involved, with debris and loose wheels bouncing all over the racing surface.

As the drivers instinctively scurried out of their machines to avoid possible flames (although no significant fires had broken out), A. J. Foyt became the only driver casualty of the incident. He injured his hand climbing over the catch fence on the outside of the track. He was checked out at the infield hospital, and cleared to drive relief if needed. One spectator was hit by a wheel from the crash.

Of the sixteen cars, eleven were damaged beyond repair. The red flag came out, and after the cleanup, the race lined up for a restart with only 22 cars. The red flag delay was about 1 hour and 24 minutes.

When the race was restarted, the field took several warm up laps, and restarted single file. The yellow light came back on almost immediately when Johnny Boyd crashed in turn 1 on the first green lap.

=== Race ===
The early half of the race was dominated by Lloyd Ruby, who was seeking his first win in the Indianapolis 500. However, a bad pit stop resulted in Ruby losing a couple of laps and he went on to finish 11th. Jackie Stewart dominated the second half of the race, leading 40 laps. Stewart was leading by a little over a lap before he began to suffer from low oil pressure with ten laps to go. Stewart parked his car in turn four, and briefly attempted to push the car back to the pits. Eventually Stewart abandoned the machine, and walked back to the garage area, allowing Graham Hill to inherit the lead as a result.

=== Finish ===
According to the official standings, Graham Hill held the lead for the final ten laps, and won the race. His original margin of victory was 42 seconds over second place, Jim Clark, pending the final results.

A total of only 7 cars reached the checkered flag, following the pileup on lap one and a series of further crashes and mechanical issues over the course of the race. 4 of these 7 cars finished on the lead lap, with the remaining 3 cars reaching the flag while 2, 29, and 33 laps down compared to the leaders. This allowed non-finishing drivers Jackie Stewart, Eddie Johnson, and Joe Leonard to all place above at least one of the finishers despite not reaching the checkered flag, as their cars succumbed to mechanical issues only after they had completed 190, 175, and 170 laps respectively, while finishing drivers Bobby Unser (P8) and Jerry Grant (P10) were shown the checkered flag upon completing only 171 and 167 laps respectively.

The finish holds the record for the fewest cars to ever finish a running of the Indianapolis 500, and at the time was the fewest cars ever to finish in any major open-wheel motorsports event at the Indianapolis Motor Speedway. The latter record has only been surpassed by the 2005 United States Grand Prix, which saw 6 cars finish.

=== Controversy over who won the race ===
During the race, confusion broke out over the running order, which resulted in people being unsure, even to this day, on who won the race. The confusion in the scoring led to a controversy, wherein second place Jim Clark's team thought they were the rightful winner. Clark had spun on two separate occasions during the race, but did not make serious contact during either incident. He did not stall his engine either time, and was able to drive to the pits for the crew to inspect the car quickly both times. Clark's team contended that he did not lose a significant amount of track position, and estimated that they were still one lap ahead of Graham Hill at the finish. The scoring pylon, which was manually controlled and unofficial, changed frequently and somewhat sporadically as the scoring was ironed out, much to the dismay of Clark's crew in particular, and much to the confusion of spectators. The unofficial results at the conclusion of the race showed Graham Hill winning by 41.13 seconds over Clark. The morning after the race, USAC released the official results, and the standings were unchanged. Colin Chapman and Andy Granatelli, the entrants of Clark's Lotus team, declined to file an official protest. A possible explanation given was that the Lotus crew did not see Hill pass by Clark during the aftermath of the second spin.

Race winner Graham Hill admitted to having an "uneventful race", being "puzzled" and "surprised" to be the winner, while other unsatisfied competitors quipped that he had "never passed a car all day long." The IMS Radio Network, which scored the race independently from the USAC officials, also came up with Hill as the first place car. The apparent controversy died out quickly, and no official action was ever taken. Years later the subject is still mildly debated in racing circles. A theory emerged that scorers accidentally omitted one lap from Jim Clark's official tally. Therefore, he was effectively placed behind Hill at the finish. The car of Al Unser was painted nearly identical to that of Clark's. The theory is that when Al Unser crashed out of the race on lap 161, scorers mistakenly thought it was Clark, and as Clark drove by in the immediate aftermath, they credited that lap to Unser by mistake.

Another version of the theory suggests an opposite situation - one of Unser's laps was erroneously credited to Clark's tally early on, and when the scoring serials were compiled and settled later in the race, the extra lap was correctly deleted. Alongside the controversy between Hill and Clark, fourth place Gordon Johncock is also theorized by some observers to have actually been the rightful winner of the race. Johncock completed the 500 miles in less elapsed time than Hill, Clark, and third place Jim McElreath. However, Johncock had suffered minor damage during the first lap accident, and restarted the race in the pit lane due to the crew changing the nose cone. USAC officials did not score his first lap out of the pit lane, and he effectively ran all day carrying a one-lap penalty to the rest of the field.

== Box score ==
Finish	Start	No	Name	Chassis	Engine	Tires	Qual	Laps	Status
1	15	24	(United Kingdom) Graham Hill R	Lola	Ford	F	159.243	200	144.317 mph
2	2	19	(United Kingdom) Jim Clark W	Lotus	Ford	F	164.114	200	+41.10
3	7	3	(United States) Jim McElreath	Brabham	Ford	F	160.908	200	+49.89
4	6	72	(United States) Gordon Johncock	Gerhardt	Ford	G	161.059	200	+1:47.48
5	17	94	(United States) Mel Kenyon R	Gerhardt	Offenhauser	G	158.555	198	Flagged
6	11	43	(United Kingdom) Jackie Stewart R	Lola	Ford	F	159.972	190	Oil Pressure
7	29	54	(United States) Eddie Johnson	Huffaker	Offenhauser	G	158.898	175	Stalled
8	28	11	(United States) Bobby Unser	Huffaker	Offenhauser	F	159.109	171	Flagged
9	20	6	(United States) Joe Leonard	Eagle	Ford	G	159.560	170	Stalled
10	10	88	(United States) Jerry Grant	Eagle	Ford	G	160.335	167	Flagged
11	5	14	(United States) Lloyd Ruby	Eagle	Ford	G	162.433	166	Cam Stud
12	23	18	(United States) Al Unser	Lotus	Ford	F	162.372	161	Crash T4
13	21	8	(United States) Roger McCluskey	Eagle	Ford	G	159.271	129	Oil Leak
14	4	98	(United States) Parnelli Jones W	Shrike	Offenhauser	F	162.484	87	Wheel Bearing
15	13	26	(United States) Rodger Ward W	Lola	Offenhauser	F	159.468	74	Handling
16	25	77	(United States) Carl Williams R	Gerhardt	Ford	F	159.645	38	Valve
17	22	56	(United States) Jim Hurtubise	Gerhardt	Offenhauser	G	159.208	29	Oil line
18	1	1	(United States) Mario Andretti	Brawner	Ford	F	165.849	27	Valve
19	3	82	(United States) George Snider	Coyote	Ford	G	162.521	22	Crash T2
20	8	12	(United States) Chuck Hulse	Watson	Ford	G	160.844	22	Crash T2
21	27	22	(United States) Bud Tingelstad	Gerhardt	Offenhauser	G	159.144	16	Overheating
22	14	28	(United States) Johnny Boyd	BRP	Ford	F	159.384	5	Crash T1
23	9	4	(United States) Don Branson	Gerhardt	Ford	G	160.385	0	Crash FS
24	12	27	(Canada) Billy Foster	Vollstedt	Ford	F	159.490	0	Crash FS
25	16	53	(United States) Gary Congdon R	Huffaker	Offenhauser	G	158.688	0	Crash FS
26	18	2	(United States) A. J. Foyt W	Lotus	Ford	G	161.355	0	Crash FS
27	19	31	(United States) Dan Gurney	Eagle	Ford	G	160.499	0	Crash FS
28	24	66	(United States) Cale Yarborough R	Vollstedt	Ford	F	159.794	0	Crash FS
29	26	37	(United States) Arnie Knepper	Cecil	Ford	F	159.440	0	Crash FS
30	30	75	(United States) Al Miller	Lotus	Ford	F	158.681	0	Crash FS
31	31	39	(United States) Bobby Grim	Watson	Offenhauser	G	158.367	0	Crash FS
32	32	34	(United States) Larry Dickson R	Lola	Ford	F	159.144	0	Crash FS
33	33	96	(United States) Ronnie Duman	Eisert	Ford	F	158.646	0	Crash FS

W Former Indianapolis 500 winner

R Indianapolis 500 Rookie

=== Race statistics ===
Lap Leaders
Laps	Leader
1–16	Mario Andretti
17–64	Jim Clark
65–75	Lloyd Ruby
76–86	Jim Clark
87–132	Lloyd Ruby
133–139	Jim Clark
140–150	Lloyd Ruby
151–190	Jackie Stewart
191–200	Graham Hill

Total laps led
Driver	Laps
Lloyd Ruby	68
Jim Clark	66
Jackie Stewart	40
Mario Andretti	16
Graham Hill	10

Yellow Lights: 6 for 41 minutes (37 laps)
Laps*	Reason
Start	Multi-car crash on frontstretch (red flag)
1–5	Restart warm up laps (9 minutes)
6–16	Johnny Boyd crash in turn 1 (12 minutes)
22–31	Hulse/Snider crash in turn 2 (12 minutes)
65–68	Jim Clark spun in turn 4 (4 minutes)
87–89	Jim Clark spun in turn 3 (3 minutes)
161–170	Al Unser crash in turn 4 (10 minutes)
* – Approximate lap counts

Tire participation chart
Supplier	No. of starters
Goodyear	16
Firestone	17*
* – Denotes race winner

== Broadcasting ==
=== Radio ===
The race was carried live on the IMS Radio Network. Sid Collins served as chief announcer. Len Sutton joined the crew, serving as "driver expert," replacing Fred Agabashian. The network had gained sponsorship from Autolite, but Agabashian worked for Champion, and he considered it a conflict of interest, so he stepped aside. He would eventually return to the network in 1973–77. At the conclusion of the race, Lou Palmer reported from victory lane. The broadcast was scheduled for four and a half hours (including a 30-minute pre-race), but the red flag delay at the start extended it.

The broadcast was carried on over 725 affiliates in all 50 states, and 850 stations worldwide including shortwave transmissions from New York and Los Angeles, and XEVIP in Mexico City. Through Armed Forces Network, the broadcast reached worldwide to locations including Vietnam, Japan, Korea, Saigon, Okinowa, Philippines, England, Spain, the Azores, Italy, France, Germany, Turkey, Greece, Pakistan, Morocco, Libya, Newfoundland, Iceland, Labrador, Greenland, and both the North and South poles. In the Indianapolis area, nearly every major radio station simulcast the broadcast. The race was heard by an estimated 100 million listeners.

Bill Frosh, who had reported from turn one for over a decade, left the on-air crew, working instead in production. Mike Ahern took over the prestigious turn one position. Newcomer Doug Zink took the backstretch location, while second-year member Ron Carrell moved to turn three.

The off-air, two-man serial scoring team of Bill Fleetemeyer and Bill Lamb were commended for their contributions to the broadcast. During this era, the radio network crew typically facilitated its own team of unofficial serial scorers (working independent of USAC), to track the progress of the race. That allowed the scoring reports to be announced on-air faster than the official USAC scorekeepers could produce them from race control. Despite the controversy over the scoring between winner Graham Hill and second place Jim Clark, Fleetemeyer and Lamb also came up with Hill as the first place car.

For 1967, the flagship station changed from WIBC to WTHI in Terre Haute. Guests in the booth during the red flag delay included Peter DePaolo, Cesar Romero, Johnnie Parsons, Wally Parks, Lucy Foyt, Phil Harris, General Howdy Wilcox, and Larry Bisceglia. During the race, guests that stopped by included Walt Arfons, Frank Borman, Al Bloemker, Louis Meyer, Mickey Thompson, J. C. Agajanian, and Duke Nalon. Senator Birch Bayh visited the booth, accompanied by Wyoming Senator Gale W. McGee and Secretary of Agriculture Orville Freeman.

As a gesture celebrating the network's 15th anniversary, as well as the 50th running of the 500, guests were presented with a commemorative gold filled Zippo lighter. One station, KXO in California, was noted and recognized as being one of the few original affiliates to carry the race all fifteen years since the network's inception.

Indianapolis Motor Speedway Radio Network
Booth Announcers	Turn Reporters	Pit/garage reporters
Chief Announcer: Sid Collins; Driver expert: Len Sutton; Statistician: John DeCamp; Historian: Donald Davidson	Turn 1: Mike Ahern; Turn 2: Howdy Bell; Backstretch: Doug Zink R Turn 3: Ron Carrell; Turn 4: Jim Shelton	Chuck Marlowe (north); Luke Walton (center); Lou Palmer (south)

=== Television ===
The race was shown live on MCA closed-circuit television in nearly 200 theaters across the United States. Charlie Brockman served as anchor. For the first time, the feed was transmitted internationally to Europe utilizing the "Early Bird" satellite. A short video clip showing the restart after the first-lap accident, and a longer clip of the last 55 laps of the race, both synchronized to audio from the IMS Radio broadcast, have been posted on YouTube.

The race was carried in the United States on ABC's Wide World of Sports. The broadcast aired on Saturday June 4. Chris Schenkel anchored the telecast for the first time. Much of the video was culled from the live closed-circuit color telecast of the race.

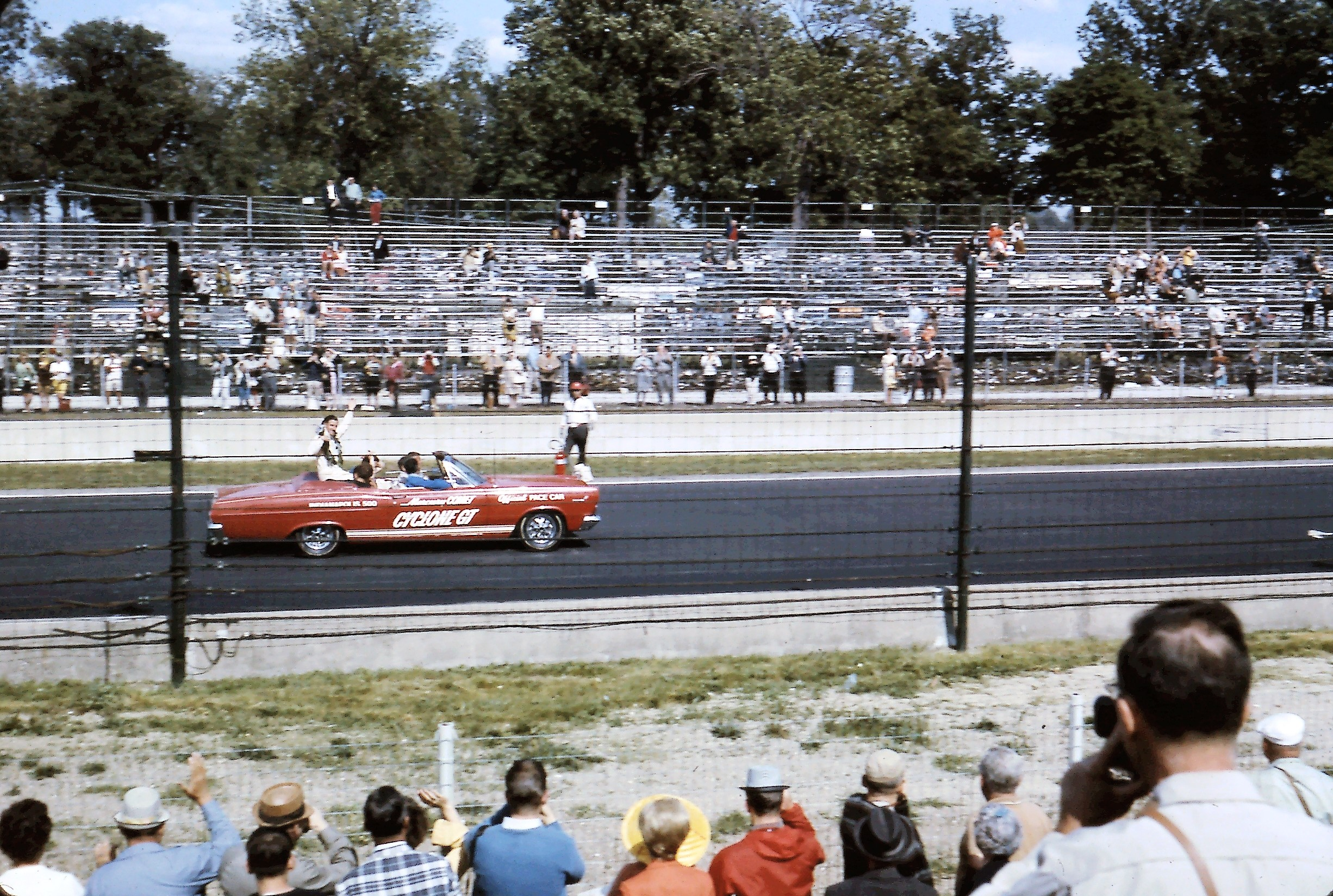

== Gallery ==
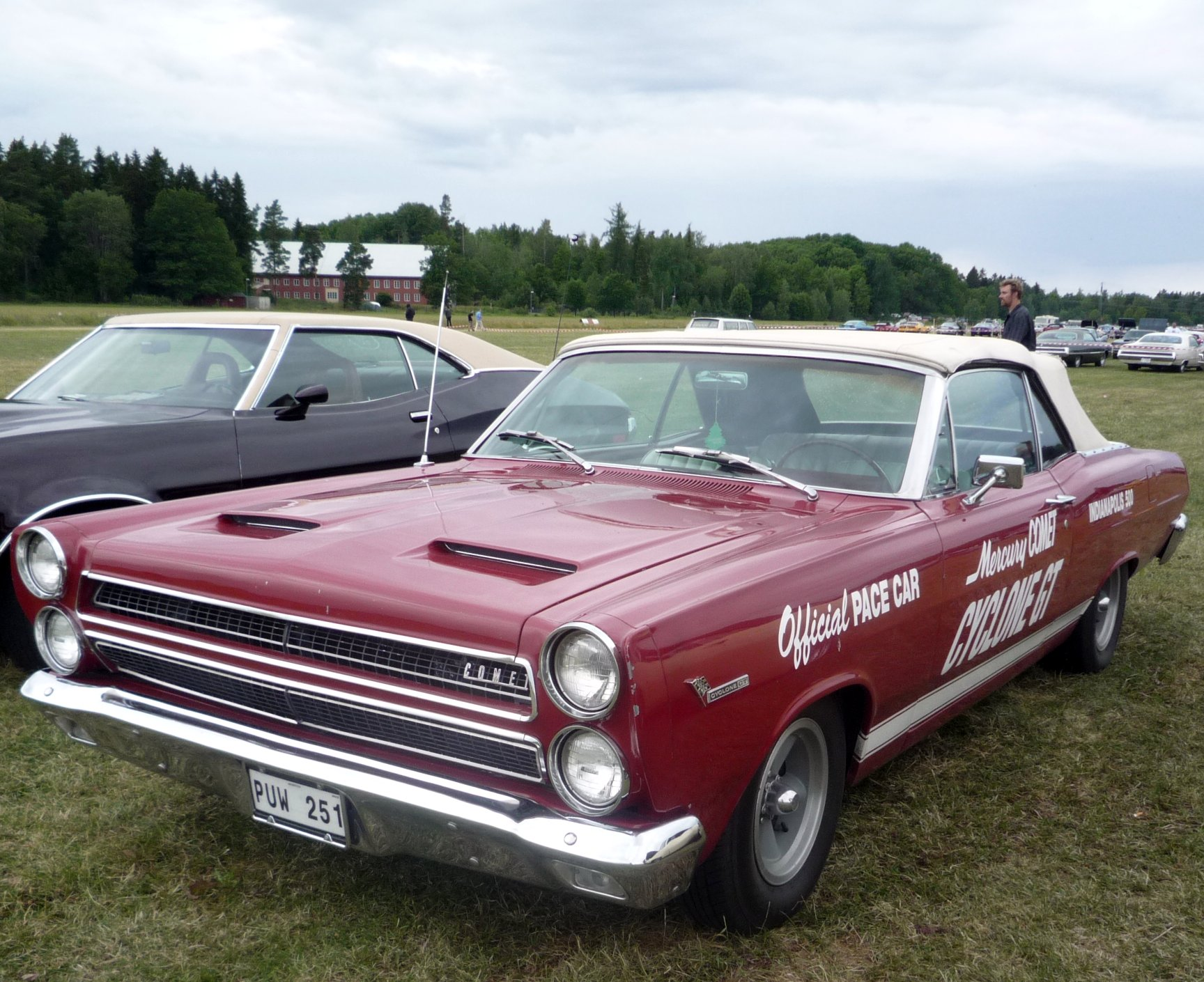
1966 pace car

== Notes ==
=== Works cited ===
- Indianapolis 500 History: Race & All-Time Stats - Official Site
- 1966 Indianapolis 500 Radio Broadcast, Indianapolis Motor Speedway Radio Network

1965 Indianapolis 500; Jim Clark	1966 Indianapolis 500; Graham Hill	1967 Indianapolis 500; A. J. Foyt
