= 1965 USAC Championship Car season =

Sports season

- USAC National Championship Trail

Season
- Races: 18
- Start date: March 28
- End date: November 21

Awards
- National champion: (United States) Mario Andretti
- Indianapolis 500 winner: (United Kingdom) Jim Clark

The 1965 USAC Championship Car season consisted of 18 races, beginning in Avondale, Arizona on March 28 and concluding at the same location on November 21. This season was notable for the Hoosier Grand Prix, the first Championship Car event held on a road course since the 1937 Vanderbilt Cup. The USAC National Champion was Mario Andretti and the Indianapolis 500 winner was Jim Clark.

Also of note, the 1965 season featured the final IndyCar victory of Parnelli Jones career in June at the Milwaukee Mile.

== Schedule and results ==
Rnd	Date	Race name	Track	Location	Type	Pole position	Winning driver
1	March 28	(United States) Jimmy Bryan Memorial	Phoenix International Raceway	Avondale, Arizona	Paved	(United States) A. J. Foyt	(United States) Don Branson
2	April 25	(United States) Trenton 100	Trenton International Speedway	Trenton, New Jersey	Paved	(United States) A. J. Foyt	(United States) Jim McElreath
3	May 31	(United States) International 500 Mile Sweepstakes	Indianapolis Motor Speedway	Speedway, Indiana	Paved	(United States) A. J. Foyt	(United Kingdom) Jim Clark
4	June 6	(United States) Rex Mays Classic	Milwaukee Mile	West Allis, Wisconsin	Paved	(United States) A. J. Foyt	(United States) Parnelli Jones
5	June 20	(United States) Langhorne 100	Langhorne Speedway	Langhorne, Pennsylvania	Paved	(United States) Mario Andretti	(United States) Jim McElreath
6	July 4	(United States) Pikes Peak Auto Hill Climb	Pikes Peak Highway	Pikes Peak, Colorado	Hill	(United States) Al Unser^{A}	(United States) Al Unser
7	July 18	(United States) Trenton 150	Trenton International Speedway	Trenton, New Jersey	Paved	(United States) A. J. Foyt	(United States) A. J. Foyt
8	July 25	(United States) Hoosier Grand Prix	Indianapolis Raceway Park	Clermont, Indiana	Road	(United States) Mario Andretti	(United States) Mario Andretti
9	August 1	(United States) Atlanta Championship 250	Atlanta International Raceway	Hampton, Georgia	Paved	(United States) A. J. Foyt	(United States) Johnny Rutherford
10	August 8	(United States) Langhorne 125	Langhorne Speedway	Langhorne, Pennsylvania	Paved	(United States) Gordon Johncock	(United States) Jim McElreath
11	August 14	(United States) Milwaukee 150	Milwaukee Mile	West Allis, Wisconsin	Paved	(United States) Parnelli Jones	(United States) Joe Leonard
12	August 21	(United States) Tony Bettenhausen Memorial	Illinois State Fairgrounds	Springfield, Illinois	Dirt	(United States) Jim McElreath	(United States) A. J. Foyt
13	August 22	(United States) Tony Bettenhausen 200	Milwaukee Mile	West Allis, Wisconsin	Paved	(United States) A. J. Foyt	(United States) Gordon Johncock
14	September 6	(United States) Ted Horn Memorial	DuQuoin State Fairgrounds	Du Quoin, Illinois	Dirt	(United States) A. J. Foyt	(United States) Don Branson
15	September 18	(United States) Hoosier Hundred	Indiana State Fairgrounds	Indianapolis, Indiana	Dirt	(United States) A. J. Foyt	(United States) A. J. Foyt
16	September 26	(United States) Trenton 200	Trenton International Speedway	Trenton, New Jersey	Paved	(United States) A. J. Foyt	(United States) A. J. Foyt
17	October 24	(United States) Golden State 100	California State Fairgrounds	Sacramento, California	Dirt	(United States) Don Branson	(United States) Don Branson
18	November 21	(United States) Bobby Ball Memorial	Phoenix International Raceway	Avondale, Arizona	Paved	(United States) Mario Andretti	(United States) A. J. Foyt

Paved/Dirt Oval
Road Course/Hill Climb

^A No pole is awarded for the Pikes Peak Hill Climb, in this schedule on the pole is the driver who started first. No lap led was awarded for the Pikes Peak Hill Climb, however, a lap was awarded to the drivers that completed the climb.

== Final points standings ==
Note: Bobby Johns is not eligible for points.

Pos	Driver	PHX1 (United States)	TRE1 (United States)	INDY (United States)	MIL1 (United States)	LHS1 (United States)	PIK (United States)	TRE2 (United States)	IRP (United States)	ATL (United States)	LHS2 (United States)	MIL2 (United States)	SPR (United States)	MIL3 (United States)	DQSF (United States)	ISF (United States)	TRE3 (United States)	CSF (United States)	PHX2 (United States)	Pts
1	(United States) Mario Andretti	6	2	3	4	**2**		Wth	**1**	2	4	2	3	16	15	2	13	3	**2**	3110
2	(United States) A. J. Foyt	**19**	**17**	**15**	**16**	17		**1**	4	**19**	2	19	1	**2**	**3**	**1**	**1**	2	1	2500
3	(United States) Jim McElreath	2	1	20	3	1		11	5	10	1	14	**5**	6	2	DNQ	3	8	23	2035
4	(United States) Don Branson	1	13	8	20	15		4	6	8	6	6	6	25	1	13	15	**1**	5	1875
5	(United States) Gordon Johncock	17	8	5	7	10		23	8	6	**3**	15	11	1	10	DNQ	14		21	1540
6	(United States) Joe Leonard			29	2	19		5	10	Wth		1		5			2		4	1415
7	(United States) Bobby Unser	16	10	19	17	14	2	14	2	22	5	4	10	18	17	4	6	4	3	1402
8	(United States) Roger McCluskey	21		30	6	13		17	3	9	DNQ	5		4		DNS	4	9	26	1060
9	(United States) Jud Larson	12	5	DNQ		DNQ		6	19	16	12	7	8	9	4	3	8	5	8	1028
10	(United States) Parnelli Jones		DNQ	2	1							**17**		DNQ						1000
11	(United Kingdom) Jim Clark			1																1000
12	(United States) Johnny Rutherford	15	11	31	15	DNQ		DNS	11	1	8	13	4	24	5	6	16	6	22	993
13	(United States) Lloyd Ruby	5	DNQ	11	19	3		18	7	23		9		3		10	26		DNQ	850
14	(United States) Jim Hurtubise	4	19	33	DNQ	21		2	18	4	21	16	DNQ	21	7	16	25		16	743
15	(United States) Al Miller			4	DNQ				Wth		20	10	12	15	Wth	DNQ	18			655
16	(Canada) Billy Foster	24	7	17	DNQ	5		20	DNP	3	17	20		26		12	24	DNQ	13	520
17	(United States) Bobby Grim		15	DNQ	8	11		3		28		24		8			7			500
18	(United States) Mickey Rupp			6	5							18								500
19	(United States) Al Unser			9	13	12	**1**	22	12	26	16	11		7		DNQ	20	11	17	495
20	(United States) Bud Tingelstad	13	4	16	18	4		15		14	19	21	7	13	16	14		16	6	460
21	(United States) George Snider	23		21	DNQ	16		9	9	25	7		2		14	8	10	15	DNQ	453
22	(United States) Ronnie Duman	3	6	22	9	6		16	14	12	14	23	15	14	Wth	DNS	19		DNQ	447
23	(United States) Carl Williams RY	DNQ	12	DNQ	DNQ	9		7					13		8	7	17	13	7	370
24	(United States) Chuck Rodee	22		28						5		12		10		DNQ		DNQ		325
25	(United States) Bob Harkey	20	9	DNQ	DNQ	8		8	15	11	DNQ					9	DNQ	10	11	325
26	(United States) Dan Gurney			26								3		12						230
27	(United States) Tommy Copp				DNQ					7		8		DNQ					25	225
28	(United States) Red Riegel					DNQ		DNQ			11		14		6	5	DNQ			205
29	(United States) Art Pollard R													22			5	DNQ	19	200
30	(United States) Arnie Knepper	7	16	18	14	22		DNQ	16	21	DNQ		16	11	13	15		7		190
31	(United States) Gary Congdon R							10	22		10		9		11	11	DNQ	18	DNQ	163
32	(United States) Sam Sessions R		DNS			DNQ				13	9	DNQ				DNQ	11		10	150
33	(United States) Eddie Johnson			10																150
34	(United States) Bob Wente	14	3	DNQ	DNQ															140
35	(United States) Len Sutton			12	21	7		DNQ												110
36	(United States) Wally Dallenbach Sr. R										13	DNQ					9			80
37	(United States) Bill Vukovich II R																		9	80
38	(United States) Bob Hurt	8		DNQ	DNQ	DNQ			Wth	29	DNQ	DNQ								75
39	(United States) Norm Hall	10		DNQ	10	DNQ		19	21											75
40	(United States) Charles Louderman						3													70
41	(United States) Wes Vandervoort R						4													60
42	(United States) Dee Jones	9								24	DNQ				DNQ	DNQ				60
43	(United States) Paul Kleinschmidt						5													50
44	(United States) Bob Mathouser		21	DNQ	11	DNQ		12	13	27	18	DNQ		17	12		22		18	45
45	(United States) Jack Hahn						6													40
46	(United States) Bay Darnell R														9	DNQ				40
47	(United States) Roy Walker R						7													30
48	(United States) Rodger Ward	11	20	DNQ	22	DNQ		DNQ	24			22		23			23		15	30
49	(United States) Dick Atkins R																	12	12	30
50	(United States) Orville Nance R						8													25
51	(United States) Slim Roberts						9													20
52	(United States) Greg Weld R			DNQ						DNQ						17	12	DNQ	20	20
53	(United States) Grier Manning R						10													15
54	(United States) Malcolm Brazier						11													10
55	(United States) Bill Cheesbourg			32	12	DNQ			17										DNQ	10
56	(United States) Louis Unser						12													5
-	(United States) Bobby Johns R			7																0
-	(United States) Dave Paul R				DNQ	DNQ		13		20	15	DNQ		DNQ						0
-	(United States) Johnny Boyd			13																0
-	(United States) Vern Root R						13													0
-	(United States) Art Malone		14	DNQ				21	23	15	22	DNQ		20						0
-	(United States) Larry Dickson R																	14	24	0
-	(United States) Dempsey Wilson			DNQ														DNQ	14	0
-	(United States) Walt Hansgen			14																0
-	(United States) Thurel Novotny R						14													0
-	(United States) Bob Daly R						15													0
-	(United States) Bob McLees R						16													0
-	(United States) Ralph Liguori	18	18	DNQ		20		24	20	17						DNQ				0
-	(United States) Mike McGreevy R			DNQ									17					DNQ	DNQ	0
-	(United States) Bob Tattersall R																	17	DNQ	0
-	(United States) Rick Vermillion R						17													0
-	(United States) Bruce Jacobi					DNQ				18					DNQ	18				0
-	(United States) Mel Kenyon			DNQ	DNQ	18														0
-	(United States) Bob Werner R						18													0
-	(United States) George Morris R														18					0
-	(United States) Clark Yowell R						19													0
-	(United States) Bob Pratt R													19						0
-	(United States) Hank Davis R						20													0
-	(United States) Dan Morgan						21													0
-	(United States) Skip Hedrick R																21			0
-	(United States) Ted Foltz						22													0
-	(United States) Masten Gregory R			23																0
-	(United States) Clyde McFarlin R						23													0
-	(United States) Bob Veith			24																0
-	(United States) Walter Miller R						24													0
-	(United States) Chuck Stevenson			25	DNQ	DNQ														0
-	(United States) Danny Collins						25													0
-	(United States) Jerry Grant R			27	DNQ															0
-	(United States) Chuck Arnold					DNQ		DNS												0
-	(United States) Bill Eldridge		DNQ			DNQ		DNQ									DNQ			0
-	(United States) Gig Stephens			DNQ		DNQ											DNQ			0
-	(United States) Bob King															DNQ	DNQ			0
-	(United States) Chuck Booth																	DNQ	DNQ	0
-	(United States) Bob Huebner																	Wth	DNQ	0
-	(United States) Bob Christie			DNQ																0
-	(United States) Paul Goldsmith			DNQ																0
-	(United States) Skip Hudson			DNQ																0
-	(United States) Ebb Rose			DNQ																0
-	(United States) Paul Russo			DNQ																0
-	(United States) Bill Sullivan																	DNQ		0
-	(United States) Chuck Hulse																		DNQ	0
-	(United States) Ray Furnal			DNP																0
-	(United States) Sherman Cleveland																	DNP		0
Pos	Driver	PHX1 (United States)	TRE1 (United States)	INDY (United States)	MIL1 (United States)	LHS1 (United States)	PIK (United States)	TRE2 (United States)	IRP (United States)	ATL (United States)	LHS2 (United States)	MIL2 (United States)	SPR (United States)	MIL3 (United States)	DQSF (United States)	ISF (United States)	TRE3 (United States)	CSF (United States)	PHX2 (United States)	Pts

Color	Result
Gold	Winner
Silver	2nd place
Bronze	3rd place
Green	4th & 5th place
Light Blue	6th-10th place
Dark Blue	Finished (Outside Top 10)
Purple	Did not finish (Ret)
Red	Did not qualify (DNQ)
Brown	Withdrawn (Wth)
Black	Disqualified (DSQ)
White	Did not start (DNS)
Blank	Did not participate (DNP)
Blank	Not competing

**In-line notation**
**Bold**	Pole position
Italics	Ran fastest race lap
*	Led most race laps
RY Rookie of the Year
R Rookie

== See also ==
- 1965 Indianapolis 500
