= Dick Atkins =

American racing driver (1936–1966)

- Born: Richard Charles Atkins; April 23, 1936 Oakland, California, U.S.
- Died: November 13, 1966 (aged 30) Gardena, California, U.S.

Champ Car career
- 13 races run over 2 years
- Years active: 1965–1966
- Best finish: 12th – 1966
- First race: 1965 Golden State 100 (Sacramento)
- Last race: 1966 Golden State 100 (Sacramento)
- First win: 1966 Golden State 100 (Sacramento)
Wins	Podiums	Poles
1	2	0

Richard Charles Atkins (April 23, 1936 – November 13, 1966) was an American racing driver from Oakland, California.

Atkins came up in sprint cars and won the Turkey Night Grand Prix in 1965 and was rewarded by race promoter J. C. Agajanian with a chance to race in the USAC National Championship in 1966. He failed to qualify for the 1966 Indianapolis 500, but finished fourth at Trenton Speedway in September then won on the dirt oval at Sacramento in October, for his first "big car" win. However, he was killed just a month later in a sprint car crash at Ascot Park in California in a wreck that also killed Don Branson. He finished 11th in 1966 USAC National Championship points.

== Awards ==
- Atkins was inducted in the West Coast Stock Car Hall of Fame in 2021.

== Complete USAC Championship Car results ==
Year	1	2	3	4	5	6	7	8	9	10	11	12	13	14	15	16	17	18	Pos	Points
1965	PHX	TRE	INDY	MIL	LAN	PPR	TRE	IRP	ATL	LAN	MIL	ISF	MIL	DSF	INF	TRE	SAC; 12	PHX; 12	49th	30
1966	PHX; 22	TRE	INDY; DNQ	MIL; 20	LAN; DNQ	ATL; 23	PIP	IRP; 10	LAN; 9	SPR; 12	MIL; 12	DUQ; 2	ISF; 6	TRE; 4	SAC; 1	PHX			11th	815
