= 1965 Indianapolis 500 =

American motor race

49th Indianapolis 500
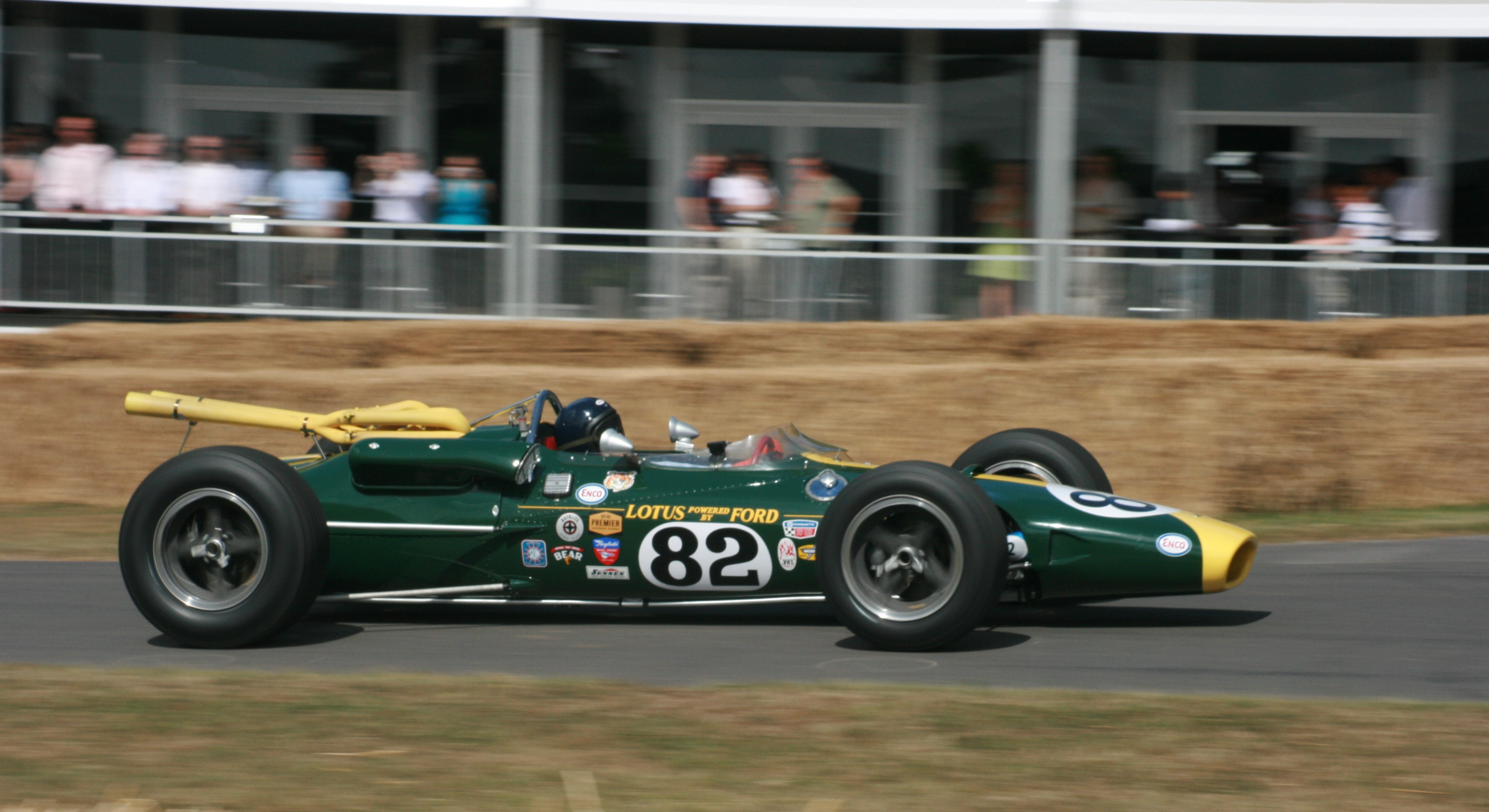

Indianapolis Motor Speedway

Indianapolis 500
- Sanctioning body: USAC
- Season: 1965 USAC season
- Date: May 31, 1965
- Winner: Jim Clark
- Winning team: Team Lotus
- Winning Chief Mechanic: David Lazenby
- Time of race: 3:19:05.34
- Average speed: 150.686 mph (242.506 km/h)
- Pole position: A. J. Foyt
- Pole speed: 161.233 mph (259.479 km/h)
- Fastest qualifier: A. J. Foyt
- Rookie of the Year: Mario Andretti
- Most laps led: Jim Clark (190)

Pre-race ceremonies
- National anthem: Purdue Band
- "Back Home Again in Indiana": Johnny Desmond
- Starting command: Tony Hulman
- Pace car: Plymouth Sport Fury
- Pace car driver: P.M. Buckminster
- Starter: Pat Vidan
- Honorary referee: Raymond Firestone
- Estimated attendance: 250,000

Television in the United States
- Network: ABC's Wide World of Sports
- Announcers: Charlie Brockman Rodger Ward

Chronology
Previous	Next
1964	1966

The 49th International 500-Mile Sweepstakes was held at the Indianapolis Motor Speedway in Speedway, Indiana on Monday, May 31, 1965.

The five-year-old "British Invasion" of Indy racing by rear engine cars (actually mid engine), which preceded the 1964 British Invasion by the Beatles, finally broke through as Team Lotus, Jim Clark and Colin Chapman triumphed in dominating fashion with the first rear-engined Indy-winning car, a Lotus 38 powered by the DOHC Ford Indy V8 engine. With only six of the 33 cars in the field still having front engines, it was the first 500 in history to have a majority of cars as rear-engined machines.

Clark, of Scotland, had won the pole position in 1964, again started from the front row, and led 190 laps, the most since Bill Vukovich (195) in 1953. He became the first foreign-born winner of the Indianapolis 500 since 1920 when French-born Gaston Chevrolet won. Clark would go on to win the 1965 World Championship (which Indianapolis was not part of any longer). He is the only driver in history to win the Indy 500 and Formula One World Championship in the same year. Clark actually chose to skip Monaco to compete at Indy.

ABC Sports covered the race for the first time on Wide World of Sports. Charlie Brockman anchored the broadcast along with Rodger Ward.

== Race background ==
After suffering a terrible crash in January at the Motor Trend 500 at Riverside, A. J. Foyt was back behind the wheel in time for the 500. Foyt had suffered a broken back, crushed sternum, and a concussion after he lost his brakes, hit an embankment, and flipped violently in a stock car.

There would be considerable turnaround in the starting lineup, with eleven rookies making the race, the most since 1951 (twelve). The rookie class of 1965 was historically notable, including such drivers as Mario Andretti, Al Unser Sr., Gordon Johncock, Joe Leonard, and George Snider.

=== Rule changes ===
Following the tragic 1964 race, this race was run relatively clean with no major accidents. Contrary to some popular belief, gasoline was not banned for the 1965 race. Instead, USAC officials crafted several calculated rule changes to effectively encourage teams to use methanol in order to be competitive. In addition, a new minimum car weight of 1,250 pounds was also established.

For 1965, all cars were required to make a minimum of two pit stops. A pit stop was generally defined as coming to a complete stop in the respective pit box, and hooking up the fueling mechanism. Tire changes were not specifically required, and some teams in fact changed zero tires all day. On-board fuel tank capacity was reduced to 75 gallons, which also included requirements that they contain rubber bladders inside. Fuel tanks were required to be behind the driver on the left side of each car, and fuel crossover tubes were prohibited ahead of the driver. Pressurized fueling rigs were outlawed. All fueling rigs from 1965 onward had to be gravity fed, a rule that still is in effect as of 2025.

Conventional "pump" gasoline registered better fuel mileage than methanol, and gasoline-powered cars could go a longer distance before needing to refuel. Prior to 1965, the typical strategy of the gasoline-powered cars was to make one scheduled pit stop for fuel at some point after the halfway mark (lap 100). Ideally, the pit stop would come around lap 120–125 (of 200), meaning the crew needed only to refill the tank at that point about 3/4 full to make it to the finish. Tires would be inspected for wear, and changed only if needed; right side tires were of the primary concern.

The methanol-powered engines had worse fuel mileage, but produced more horsepower and effectively raced faster. Methanol-powered cars in general needed to make 2–3 pit stops to complete the full 500 miles, even before the rule changes. Since cars were now required to make a minimum of two fuel stops, the advantage to using gasoline (i.e., fewer pit stops and better resulting track position) was diminished, or outright lost.

While most teams switched to methanol, the Agajanian team decided to utilize a methanol/gasoline blend. Chief mechanic Johnny Pulson and driver Parnelli Jones determined that they were effectively down on power, finished second, and attributed the fuel blend as what cost them a chance to win the race. Jones had to make a third pit stop, and was experiencing poor fuel mileage. In the final five laps, Jones was running low on fuel, and had to nurse the car to the finish line. He held off Mario Andretti for second place by just five seconds, then ran out of fuel on his cool down lap. He stalled on the backstretch, and had to be towed back to the pit area.

==== Time trials ====
One other major change was implemented for time trials. The evening before pole day time trials, a new blind draw was to be used to establish the qualifying order (namely for Pole Day). Prior to 1965, no draw was used, and the qualifying order was a "first-come, first-served" line-up, queued down the pit lane and usually stretching into the garage area. Some teams would even claim their spots in line the night before. The unorganized scramble to roll the cars into a queue had often led to heated exchanges, collisions, and unfair situations.

Each entry would still be allowed up to three attempts to qualify (across all four scheduled days). Once the original qualifying draw order had been exhausted on Pole Day, if there was still time left in the day (prior to the traditional 6 o'clock gun), the track was open for qualifying on a first-come, first-served basis. A proposal to charge cars with an attempt if they got to the front of the line but elected not to go out, or went out and did not take the green flag to start the run, was rejected. Despite the addition of a qualifying draw, each car in the order was not yet guaranteed the opportunity to make an attempt during the pole round. If rain were to delay or interrupt the qualifying line on Pole Day, any cars left in the original qualifying order at the time the track closed (due to rain or at the 6 o'clock gun) were simply out of luck, and had to qualify on the next round. This technicality would be corrected in 1971.

== Race schedule ==
Race schedule – April/May 1965
Sun	Mon	Tue	Wed	Thu	Fri	Sat
25; Trenton	26	27	28	29	30	1 Practice
2 Practice	3 Practice	4 Practice	5 Practice	6 Practice	7 Practice	8 Practice
9 Practice	10; Practice	11; Practice	12; Practice	13; Practice	14; Practice	15; Pole Day
16; Time Trials	17; Practice	18; Practice	19; Practice	20; Practice	21; Practice	22; Time Trials
23; Bump Day	24; 500 Open	25; 500 Open	26; 500 Open	27; Carb Day	28	29; Parade
30; Meeting	31; Indy 500					

Color	Notes
Green	Practice
Dark Blue	Time trials
Silver	Race day
Blank	No track activity

- The 500 Festival Open Invitation golf tournament was held May 24–27.

== Practice and Time trials ==
The track opened for practice on Saturday May 1. On Monday May 3, Jim Clark turned a lap of 150.779 mph, the first driver over 150 mph for the month. On Tuesday May 4, chief steward Harlan Fengler lifted the speed limits, and A. J. Foyt upped his practice speed to 155 mph.

On Wednesday May 5, A. J. Foyt's Lotus-Ford wrecked on the backstretch when a magnesium hub carrier snapped. The next day, all of the Lotus-Fords and Lola cars were parked by USAC for a few days until tests and improvements could be made to the magnesium parts. Thursday's practice was cut short due to rain.

On Monday May 10, after adequate improvements, the Lotus-Fords were authorized to return to the track. Both Foyt and Clark turned laps over 158 mph. Foyt and Clark continued to top the speed charts during the week, and on Thursday, Foyt blistered the track with a new unofficial track record of 161.146 mph.

On the day before pole day, Ebb Rose spun in turn one in front of Bobby Unser, collecting him in the crash. Unser was driving the brand new four-wheel drive Novi car entered by Andy Granatelli. Unser's car t-boned Rose's car, and spun wildly into the outside wall. Rose was not hurt. Unser was sent to the hospital for x-rays, but was not seriously injured.

=== Pole Day – Saturday May 15 ===
Pole day was a record-setting day, as drivers officially broke the 160 mph barrier. Rookie Mario Andretti was one of the first drivers to set the pace, putting in a lap of 159.406 mph, and a four-lap average of 158.849 mph. Later, Jim Clark in the Lotus 38, became the first driver to break the 160 mph barrier. His first two laps of 160.772 mph and 160.973 mph set one-lap records. His record four-lap average of 160.729 mph tentatively put him on the pole.

Defending race winner A. J. Foyt ended up as the fastest of the day, with three laps in the 161 mph range. His first lap of 161.958 mph established the new one-lap track record. His record four-lap average of 161.233 secured the pole position, his first pole at Indy.

A day after his crash during practice, Bobby Unser got in a year-old Novi back up car to qualify 8th. Nineteen cars qualified on pole day.

=== Second day – Sunday May 16 ===
Strong winds kept most cars off the track. Only two drivers (Don Branson and Arnie Knepper) qualified. At the end of the first weekend of time trials, the field was filled to 21 cars.

=== Third day – Saturday May 22 ===
Jim Hurtubise, who was seriously burned in a crash at Milwaukee in 1964, completed his comeback by qualifying a Novi at 156.860 mph (252.442 km/h), the fastest of eleven qualifiers that day.

Two drivers crashed during the day, Rodger Ward and Lloyd Ruby. Ruby wrecked his already-qualified machine, but Ward was still struggling to get up to speed. Masten Gregory and Al Unser both blew engines, but were able to keep the cars off the wall.

Bobby Johns, a NASCAR regular, skipped the World 600 and entered as a teammate to Jim Clark in another Lotus. He qualified for 22nd position, third fastest of the afternoon.

At the end of the day, there was only one spot left open in the field.

=== Bump day – Sunday May 23 ===
Former winner Rodger Ward failed to qualify. He suffered a crash and three blown engines during the month. He got onto the track in the final 15 minutes, but his qualifying attempt was too slow to make the field.

Bob Mathouser was the final driver in Indy history to attempt to qualify in a front-wheel drive machine, but the engine blew and he did not make the field.

== Starting grid ==
Row	Inside		Middle		Outside	
1	1	(United States) A. J. Foyt W	82	(United Kingdom) Jim Clark	17	(United States) Dan Gurney
2	12	(United States) Mario Andretti R	98	(United States) Parnelli Jones W	66	(Canada) Billy Foster R
3	74	(United States) Al Miller	9	(United States) Bobby Unser	7	(United States) Lloyd Ruby
4	54	(United States) Bob Veith	24	(United States) Johnny Rutherford	16	(United States) Len Sutton
5	52	(United States) Jim McElreath	76	(United States) Gordon Johncock R	81	(United States) Mickey Rupp R
6	94	(United States) George Snider R	48	(United States) Jerry Grant R	4	(United States) Don Branson
7	18	(United States) Arnie Knepper R	59	(United States) Jim Hurtubise	53	(United States) Walt Hansgen
8	83	(United States) Bobby Johns R	25	(United States) Roger McCluskey	5	(United States) Bud Tingelstad
9	65	(United States) Ronnie Duman	88	(United States) Chuck Stevenson	29	(United States) Joe Leonard R
10	23	(United States) Eddie Johnson	14	(United States) Johnny Boyd	19	(United States) Chuck Rodee
11	41	(United States) Masten Gregory R	45	(United States) Al Unser R	47	(United States) Bill Cheesbourg

R Indianapolis 500 rookie
W Indianapolis 500 winner

=== Alternates ===
- First alternate: Rodger Ward W (#2)

=== Failed to qualify ===
- Bob Christie (#21)
- Ray Furnal R (#96) – Entry declined, lack of experience
- Paul Goldsmith (#36)
- Bobby Grim (#86)
- Norm Hall (#8)
- Bob Harkey (#10, #95)
- Skip Hudson R (#96) – Failed rookie test
- Bob Hurt R (#34)
- Mel Kenyon R (#27)
- Jud Larson (#15)
- Ralph Ligouri R (#99)
- Art Malone (#67)
- Bob Mathouser (#77, #87)
- Mike McGreevey R (#65)
- Ebb Rose (#79)
- Paul Russo (#21)
- Gig Stephens R
- Greg Weld R (#19) – Failed rookie test
- Bob Wente (#67)
- Carl Williams R (#33)
- Dempsey Wilson (#44)

== Race recap ==
The Wood Brothers from the NASCAR Grand National circuit, were invited by Ford Motor Company to work the pit stops for Team Lotus (drivers Jim Clark and Bobby Johns). Their arrival at the Speedway was quickly recognized and much reported. They were well known for their rapid pit stop work in NASCAR, and their presence immediately created a stir in the garage area. It took them only a short time to acclimatize to the open wheel championship cars' equipment.

Their contributions to the victory, however, have been considered overstated in some cases. Historians agree that Clark's Lotus-Ford was capable of winning the race handily without the added help of the Wood Brothers. In fact, the only work done on the cars was routine refueling, as they did not need to change tires during the race. Clark made only two stops all day, and the quickness of the refueling process was largely attributed to a specially designed gravity-fueling rig with a venturi tube. One of the things they did ahead of time was to "break in" the new fueling hose nozzles by simply working them in and out of the coupling for a period of time.

=== First half ===
A. J. Foyt started on the pole, but Jim Clark led the first lap. Jim Hurtubise dropped out with a broken transmission on the first lap. Foyt took the lead on lap two, and at first glance, the early laps appeared as if they were going to develop into a duel. However, Clark re-took the lead on lap 3, and pulled away.

Heavy attrition saw 17 cars drop out with engine or mechanical trouble before reaching the halfway point.

Lloyd Ruby spun, but was able to continue. He went to the pits for new tires, but the heavily flat-spotted tires required a minute and a half to change.

Clark led until lap 65, giving up the lead for a pit stop. A. J. Foyt led from lap 66–74. On lap 75, Clark regained the lead of the race.

=== Second half ===
Jim Clark still led at the halfway point, and would not relinquish the lead for the remainder of the race. Early contender A. J. Foyt dropped out after 115 laps with a broken gearbox.

The lone accident of the day involved Bud Tingelstad, who lost a wheel and spun into the outside wall in turn three.

Scotland's Jim Clark became the first non-American winner of the Indianapolis 500 since 1920. Clark led three times for a total of 190 laps. Only eleven cars were running at the finish. Second place Parnelli Jones ran out of fuel on the final lap, and pushed his car back to the pits.

Rookie Mario Andretti, who ran no lower than 6th all afternoon, came home third, and won the Rookie of the Year award. Despite rapidly becoming obsolete, two front-engined roadsters still finished in the top ten. Rookie Gordon Johncock finished 5th, and Eddie Johnson came home 10th. Johncock was locked in a duel with Al Miller in the late stages of the race.

The race was slowed by only three yellow lights for a total of 13 minutes.

== Box score ==
Finish	Start	No	Name	Chassis	Engine	Tire	Qual	Laps	Status
1	2	82	(United Kingdom) Jim Clark	Lotus	Ford	F	160.729	200	150.686 mph
2	5	98	(United States) Parnelli Jones W	Kuzma-Lotus	Ford	F	158.625	200	+1:59.98
3	4	12	(United States) Mario Andretti R	Brawner	Ford	F	158.849	200	+2:05.36
4	7	74	(United States) Al Miller	Lotus	Ford	F	157.805	200	+5:34.53
5	14	76	(United States) Gordon Johncock R	Watson	Offenhauser	F	155.012	200	+5:48.28
6	15	81	(United States) Mickey Rupp R	Gerhardt	Offenhauser	F	154.839	198	Flagged
7	22	83	(United States) Bobby Johns R	Lotus	Ford	F	155.481	197	Flagged
8	18	4	(United States) Don Branson	Watson	Ford	G	155.501	197	Flagged
9	32	45	(United States) Al Unser R	Lotus	Ford	G	154.440	196	Flagged
10	28	23	(United States) Eddie Johnson	Watson	Offenhauser	F	153.998	195	Flagged
11	9	7	(United States) Lloyd Ruby	Halibrand	Ford	G	157.246	184	Blown Engine
12	12	16	(United States) Len Sutton	Vollstedt	Ford	F	156.121	177	Flagged
13	29	14	(United States) Johnny Boyd	BRP	Ford	F	155.172	140	Gearbox
14	21	53	(United States) Walt Hansgen	Huffaker	Offenhauser	F	155.662	117	Overheating
15	1	1	(United States) A. J. Foyt W	Lotus	Ford	G	161.233	115	Gearbox
16	24	5	(United States) Bud Tingelstad	Lola	Ford	F	154.672	115	Crash T3
17	6	66	(Canada) Billy Foster R	Vollstedt	Offenhauser	G	158.416	85	Water manifold
18	19	18	(United States) Arnie Knepper R	Kurtis Kraft	Offenhauser	F	154.513	80	Cylinder
19	8	9	(United States) Bobby Unser	Ferguson	Novi	F	157.467	69	Oil Fitting
20	13	52	(United States) Jim McElreath	Brabham	Offenhauser	F	155.878	66	Rear End
21	16	94	(United States) George Snider R	Gerhardt	Offenhauser	F	154.825	64	Rear End
22	25	65	(United States) Ronnie Duman	Gerhardt	Offenhauser	F	154.533	62	Rear End
23	31	41	(United States) Masten Gregory R	BRP	Ford	F	154.540	59	Oil Pressure
24	10	54	(United States) Bob Veith	Huffaker	Offenhauser	G	156.427	58	Piston
25	26	88	(United States) Chuck Stevenson	Kuzma	Offenhauser	F	154.275	50	Piston
26	3	17	(United States) Dan Gurney	Lotus	Ford	G	158.898	42	Timing Gears
27	17	48	(United States) Jerry Grant R	Halibrand	Offenhauser	G	154.606	30	Magneto
28	30	19	(United States) Chuck Rodee	Halibrand	Offenhauser	F	154.546	28	Rear End
29	27	29	(United States) Joe Leonard R	Halibrand	Ford	G	154.268	27	Oil Leak
30	23	25	(United States) Roger McCluskey	Halibrand	Ford	G	155.186	18	Clutch
31	11	24	(United States) Johnny Rutherford	Halibrand	Ford	G	156.291	15	Rear End
32	33	47	(United States) Bill Cheesbourg	Gerhardt	Offenhauser	G	153.774	14	Magneto
33	20	59	(United States) Jim Hurtubise	Kurtis Kraft	Novi	F	156.863	1	Transmission

W Former Indianapolis 500 winner

R Indianapolis 500 Rookie

=== Race statistics ===
Lap Leaders
Laps	Leader
1	Jim Clark
2	A. J. Foyt
3–65	Jim Clark
66–74	A. J. Foyt
75–200	Jim Clark

Total laps led
Driver	Laps
Jim Clark	190
A. J. Foyt	10

Yellow Lights: 3 for 13 minutes
Laps*	Reason
18–19	Lloyd Ruby spin (4 minutes; 2 laps)
24	No incident (2 minutes; 1 lap)
119–122	Bud Tinglestad crash (7 minutes; 4 laps)
* – Approximate lap counts

Tire participation chart
Supplier	No. of starters
Goodyear	12
Firestone	21*
* – Denotes race winner

== Broadcasting ==
=== Radio ===
The race was carried live on the IMS Radio Network. Sid Collins served as chief announcer for the 14th year, and 18th year overall with the crew. Fred Agabashian served as "driver expert," and Rodger Ward (who failed to qualify), joined the pre-race coverage briefly to offer commentary. The four and a half hour broadcast opened with a 30-minute pre-race segment.

The broadcast was carried by over 800 affiliates and was heard by an estimated 100 million listeners worldwide. The broadcast was carried by Armed Forces Network, as well as Radio New York Worldwide. Foreign translation rebroadcasts in Spanish, Portuguese, French, and Italian were heard in Central and South America and elsewhere.

After visiting the broadcast booth in 1964 for an interview, Donald Davidson returned, joining the crew full-time as race historian. Also new for 1965 was Ron Carrell, who reported from the backstretch. Other guests that visited the booth included Gus Grissom, Senator Birch Bayh, Assistant Postmaster General Tyler Able, Wally Parks, Peter DePaolo, J. C. Agajanian, 500 Festival Chairperson Margaret Clark and 500 Festival Queen Suzanne Devine Sams.

Absent from the crew was nine-year veteran Jack Shapiro, who died the previous summer at the age of 37.

Indianapolis Motor Speedway Radio Network
Booth Announcers	Turn Reporters	Pit/garage reporters
Chief Announcer: Sid Collins; Driver expert: Fred Agabashian; Statistician: John DeCamp	Turn 1: Bill Frosh; Turn 2: Howdy Bell; Backstretch: Ron Carrell R Turn 3: Mike Ahern; Turn 4: Jim Shelton	Chuck Marlowe (north); Luke Walton (center); Lou Palmer (south)

=== Television ===
The race was shown live on MCA closed-circuit television in approximately 180 theaters and venues across the United States. Charlie Brockman served as anchor.

The following weekend on June 5, the race was carried in the United States on ABC's Wide World of Sports. It was ABC's first exclusive network coverage of the Indianapolis 500 on race day. Charlie Brockman anchored the telecast, as he did during the closed-circuit broadcast. The Wide World of Sports broadcast was an edited tape of the closed-circuit broadcast, and driver Rodger Ward served as analyst. Ward sat out the 1965 race, having failed to qualify, but returned in 1966.

== Notes ==
=== Works cited ===
- Indianapolis 500 History: Race & All-Time Stats – Official Site
- 1965 Indianapolis 500 Radio Broadcast, Indianapolis Motor Speedway Radio Network

1964 Indianapolis 500; A. J. Foyt	1965 Indianapolis 500; Jim Clark	1966 Indianapolis 500; Graham Hill
Preceded by 147.350 mph (1964 Indianapolis 500)	Record for the fastest average speed 150.686 mph	Succeeded by 151.207 mph (1967 Indianapolis 500)
