= Jim Hurtubise =

American racing driver (1932–1989)

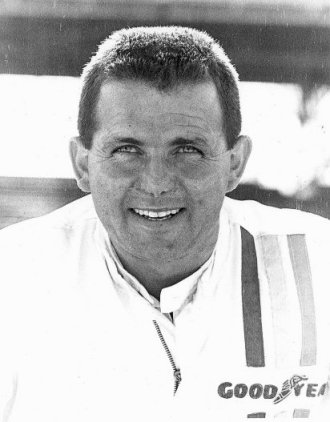
- Born: James Ernest Hurtubise; December 5, 1932 North Tonawanda, New York, U.S.
- Died: January 6, 1989 (aged 56) Port Arthur, Texas, U.S.

Champ Car career
- 96 races run over 23 years
- Best finish: 6th (1961, 1962)
- First race: 1959 Hoosier Hundred (ISF)
- Last race: 1974 Pocono 500 (Pocono)
- First win: 1959 Golden State 100 (Sacramento)
- Last win: 1962 Tony Bettenhausen Memorial (Springfield)
Wins	Podiums	Poles
4	15	3

NASCAR Cup Series career
- 36 races run over 16 years
- Best finish: 46th (1968)
- First race: 1957 Race 22 (Ascot Park)
- Last race: 1977 Delaware 500 (Dover)
- First win: 1966 Atlanta 500 (Atlanta)
Wins	Top tens	Poles
1	11	0

Formula One World Championship career
- Active years: 1960
- Team: Christensen
- Entries: 1
- Championships: 0
- Wins: 0
- Podiums: 0
- Career points: 0
- Pole positions: 0
- Fastest laps: 0
- First entry: 1960 Indianapolis 500

James Ernest Hurtubise (December 5, 1932 – January 6, 1989) was an American racing driver who competed in Championship Cars, sprint cars and stock cars. Hurtubise enjoyed much success in sprint cars, champ dirt cars, and stock cars, and was the winner of the 1966 Atlanta 500; however, he never achieved the success at the Indianapolis 500 which his rookie qualifying run promised, when he out qualified pole-sitter Eddie Sachs by three mph, nearly breaking the 150-mph mark.

"Herk" was a fan favorite throughout much of his career because of his fun-loving attitude and his hard driving style.

== Early racing career ==
Hurtubise began in the early 1950s racing his number 56 coupe alongside his brother Pete in the Sportsman class at venues in Southeastern Canada and Western New York, including Merrittville Speedway, Ontario, and Cuba Lake Raceway in Cuba, New York. After the 1955-56 season, Hurtubise left for California where he began racing modifieds but soon moved to sprint cars, where he became a champion on the International Motor Contest Association (IMCA) and California Racing Association circuits.

== Championship Car career ==
Hurtubise raced in the USAC Championship Car series in the 1959–1968 and 1970–1974 seasons, with 97 career starts. He finished in the top-ten 38 times, with four victories, in 1959 at Sacramento, 1960 at Langhorne, and 1961 and 1962 at Springfield. In 1964, after suffering serious burns in an accident during the Rex Mays Classic at the Milwaukee Mile, doctors asked Hurtubise how he wanted his hands shaped permanently. Hurtubise told them to pin his hands so he could hold a beer can, knowing that if he "could hold a beer can, (he) could hold a steering wheel." Hurtubise would later be awarded the Ralph DePalma award for overcoming his injuries to return to racing.

Hurtubise ran in ten Indianapolis 500 races between 1960 and 1974. His best finish was a thirteenth in 1962. Hurtubise was named the 1960 Indianapolis 500 Rookie of the Year.

In 1965, Hurtubise qualified using a Novi engine, the last year that engine would be used in the race, having been considered obsolete several years before. The engine failed on the first lap, and he finished last.

In 1966, Hurtubise entered a rear-engine car, which was taking over from the front-engine roadsters as the standard for the race, and finished 17th.

=== The Mallard ===
After failing to qualify in 1967, in 1968, Hurtubise ran the last front-engine car to date in the race. He and his brother Pete designed and built the new roadster in their garage, naming it the "Mallard". He claimed the car was lighter than previous roadsters, which would allow it to be competitive with the other rear-engine cars.

From 1969 through 1971, Hurtubise would continue to attempt to qualify with the roadster, but failed to make the field, which was now fully rear-engine cars.

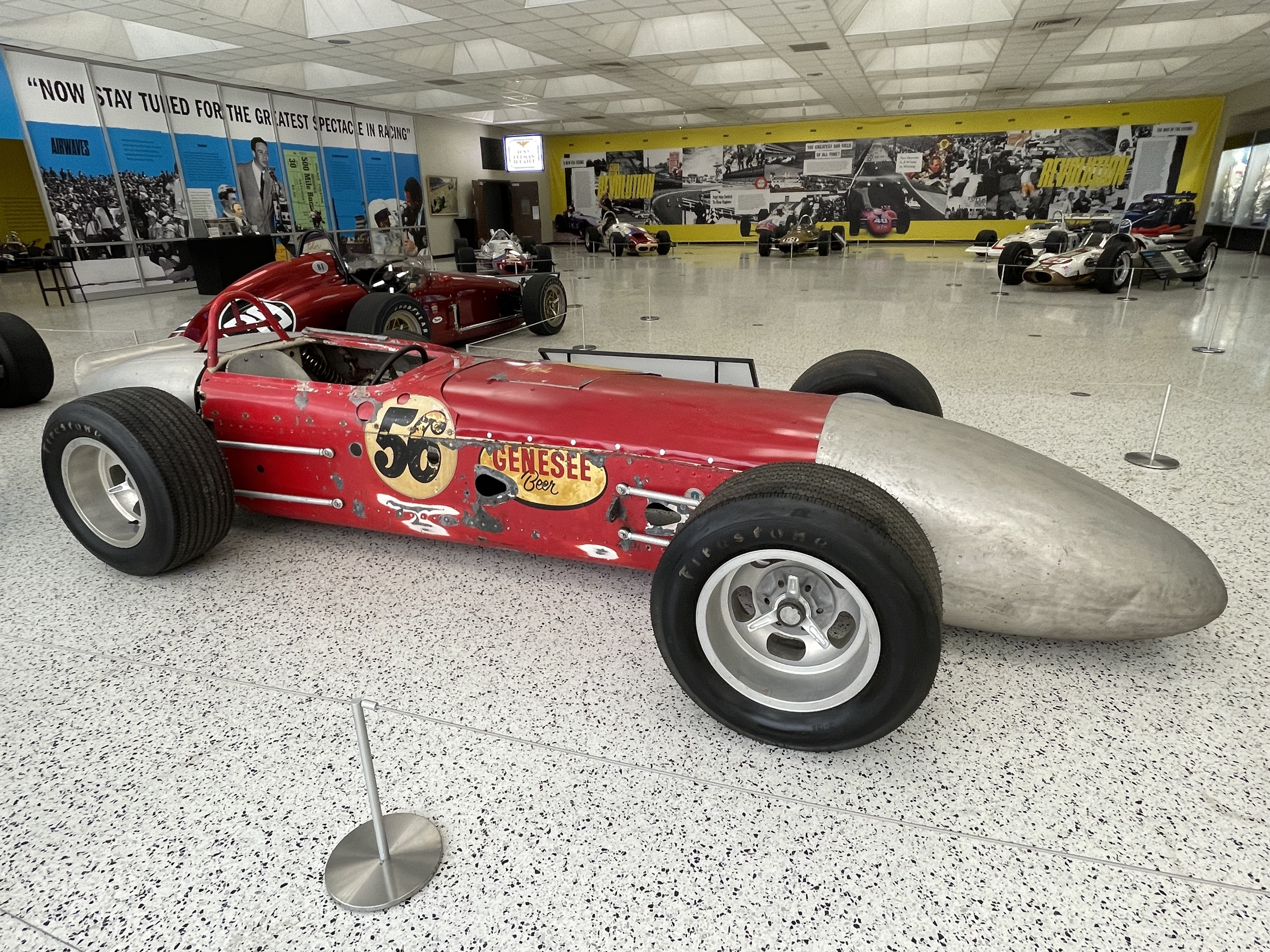
Hurtubise attempted numerous Indianapolis 500s in his self-built Mallard

In 1972, Hurtubise had qualified a rear-engine car thirteenth. However on "bump day", he put the roadster, sponsored by Miller Beer in line to make a qualification attempt shortly before the closing deadline of 6:00 pm. The time expired before it was his turn to qualify. He then removed the engine cover to reveal that the car had no engine, but five chilled cases of his sponsor's product, which he shared with the other pit crews and race officials

From 1973 through 1975, Hurtubise attempted to qualify rear-engine cars, missing the field in 1973 and 1975, while qualifying 28th in 1974, finishing the race 28th after blowing the engine on lap 31. This would be the last year he would successfully qualify for the race.

For the 1976 and 1977 races, Hurtubise was back with his front-engine Mallard roadster, but was not quick enough to make the field. In 1978, he returned, once again attempting to qualify the Mallard, but Tom Binford, the chief steward, refused to allow him a qualifying attempt, stating the car had not showed it was capable of race speed during practice. He then sat in entrant Bob Harkey’s car for ten minutes refusing to move. After finally leaving the car he ran onto the track where he was tackled and apprehended by the police.

In subsequent years, Hurtubise continued to attempt to get the Mallard into the field, with his final attempt in 1981. This was the final attempt for any front-engine car in the race, thirteen years after the last time a car of that type had qualified for the race, and seventeen years since the last time one had won.

In 1972, Hurtubise drove the Mallard in an IndyCar race at Michigan in 1972, qualifying 26th (last) and finishing 23rd. He drove the same car a year earlier at the Pocono 500, qualifying 33rd (last) and finishing thirtieth. This would be the last time a front-engine car would ever run in an IndyCar race.

== NASCAR career ==
In 1957, Hurtubise started his NASCAR Cup career running two races. Over the next twenty years, he would enter 36 races, winning one race at Atlanta Motor Speedway, and amassing eleven top ten finishes.

== World Championship career summary ==
The Indianapolis 500 was part of the FIA World Championship from 1950 through 1960. Drivers competing at Indy during those years were credited with World Championship points and participation. Hurtubise participated in one World Championship race, finishing eighteenth and receiving no points.

== Personal life ==
Hurtubise was from the Buffalo suburb of North Tonawanda, New York. Hurtubise died January 6, 1989, after suffering a heart attack near his home in Port Arthur, Texas. He was 56 years old. He is interred at Crown Hill Cemetery in the Community Mausoleumat the coordinates 39.8274766°N 86.1730061°W in Indianapolis.

== Awards and honors ==
Hurtubise was inducted into the FOAR SCORE (Friends of Auto Racing Seeking Cooperation of Racing Enthusiasts) Club in its inaugural class in 1985 and the National Sprint Car Hall of Fame in 1993. Hurtubise was the 1998 pioneer selection for the Northeast Dirt Modified Hall of Fame, and was named to the Greater Buffalo Sports Hall of Fame in 2004.

== Racing record ==
=== Complete USAC Championship Car results ===
Year	1	2	3	4	5	6	7	8	9	10	11	12	13	14	15	16	17	18	19	20	21	22	23	24	25	26	27	28	Pos	Points
1959	DAY	TRE	INDY	MIL	LAN	SPR	MIL	DUQ	SYR	ISF; 16	TRE; 7	PHX; DNQ	SAC; 1																21st	260
1960	TRE; 17	INDY; 18	MIL; 11	LAN; 1	SPR; 10	MIL; 26	DUQ; 13	SYR; 15	ISF; 12	TRE; 13	SAC; 14	PHX; 2																	16th	420
1961	TRE; 2	INDY; 22	MIL; 5	LAN; 8	MIL; 7	SPR; 1	DUQ; 18	SYR; 3	ISF; 18	TRE; 2	SAC; 14	PHX; DNS																	6th	939
1962	TRE; 6	INDY; 13	MIL; 3	LAN; 3	TRE; 5	SPR; 1	MIL; 21	LAN; 2	SYR; 4	ISF; 8	TRE; 9	SAC; 4	PHX; 5																6th	1,340
1963	TRE; 3	INDY; 22	MIL; 19	LAN; 3	TRE; 4	SPR; 17	MIL; 8	DUQ; 8	ISF; 10	TRE; 24	SAC; 11	PHX																	9th	660
1964	PHX; 16	TRE; 2	INDY; 14	MIL; 14	LAN	TRE	SPR	MIL	DUQ	ISF	TRE	SAC	PHX																25th	160
1965	PHX; 4	TRE; 19	INDY; 33	MIL; DNQ	LAN; 21	PPR	TRE; 2	IRP; 18	ATL; 4	LAN; 21	MIL; 16	ISF; DNQ	MIL; 21	DSF; 7	INF; 16	TRE; 25	SAC	PHX; 16											14th	743
1966	PHX; 13	TRE	INDY; 17	MIL; 22	LAN; 17	ATL; 26	PIP	IRP	LAN	SPR; DNQ	MIL; 26	DUQ	ISF	TRE; 17	SAC	PHX; DNQ													-	0
1967	PHX	TRE	INDY; DNQ	MIL; 16	LAN; 15	PIP	MOS; 8	MOS; 9	IRP; 11	LAN; 13	MTR; 17	MTR; 7	SPR; 5	MIL; 19	DUQ	ISF; DNQ	TRE	SAC	HAN	PHX	RIV; 18								23rd	280
1968	HAN	LVG	PHX	TRE	INDY; 30	MIL	MOS	MOS	LAN	PIP	CDR	NAZ	IRP	IRP	LAN	LAN	MTR	MTR	SPR	MIL	DUQ	ISF	TRE	SAC	MCH	HAN	PHX	RIV	-	0
1969	PHX	HAN	INDY; DNQ	MIL	LAN	PIP	CDR	NAZ	TRE	IRP	IRP	MIL	SPR	DOV	DUQ	ISF	BRN	BRN	TRE	SAC	KEN	KEN	PHX	RIV					-	0
1970	PHX	SON	TRE	INDY; DNQ	MIL	LAN	CDR	MCH	IRP	SPR	MIL	ONT; 32	DUQ	ISF	SED	TRE	SAC	PHX											-	0
1971	RAF	RAF	PHX	TRE	INDY; DNQ	MIL	POC; 30	MCH	MIL	ONT; DNQ	TRE	PHX																	-	0
1972	PHX; 12	TRE; 21	INDY; 23	MIL; DNQ	MCH; 23	POC; DNQ	MIL	ONT	TRE	PHX																			41st	15
1973	TWS	TRE	TRE	INDY; DNQ	MIL	POC; 23	MCH	MIL	ONT	ONT	ONT; DNQ	MCH	MCH	TRE	TWS	PHX													-	0
1974	ONT	ONT	ONT; DNQ	PHX	TRE	INDY; 25	MIL	POC; 24	MCH	MIL	MCH	TRE	TRE	PHX															-	0
1975	ONT	ONT	ONT	PHX	TRE	INDY; DNQ	MIL	POC	MCH	MIL	MCH	TRE	PHX																-	0
1976	PHX	TRE	INDY; DNQ	MIL	POC	MCH	TWS	TRE	MIL	ONT	MCH	TWS	PHX																-	0
1977	ONT	PHX	TWS	TRE	INDY; DNQ	MIL	POC	MOS	MCH	TWS	MIL	ONT	MCH	PHX															-	0
1978	PHX	ONT	TWS	TRE	INDY; DNQ	MOS	MIL	POC	MCH	ATL	TWS	MIL	ONT	MCH	TRE	SIL	BRH	PHX											-	0
1979	ONT	TWS	INDY; DNQ	MIL	POC	TWS	MIL																						-	0
1980	ONT	INDY; DNQ	MIL	POC	MOH																								-	0
1981-82	INDY; DNQ	POC	ILL	DUQ	ISF	INDY																							-	0

=== Complete PPG Indy Car Series results ===
Year	Team	1	2	3	4	5	6	7	8	9	10	11	12	13	14	Pos.	Pts
1979	Hurtubise Racing	PHX	ATL	ATL	INDY; DNQ	TRE	TRE	MCH	MCH	WGL	TRE	ONT	MCH	ATL	PHX	-	0
1980	Hurtubise Racing	ONT	INDY; DNQ	MIL	POC	MOH	MCH	WGL	MIL	ONT	MCH	MEX	PHX			-	0

=== Indianapolis 500 results ===
Year	Chassis	Engine	Start	Finish
1960	Christensen	Offy	23rd	18th
1961	Epperly	Offy	3rd	22nd
1962	Watson	Offy	29th	13th
1963	Kurtis Kraft	Novi	2nd	22nd
1964	Hurtubise	Offy	11th	14th
1965	Kurtis Kraft	Novi	23rd	33rd
1966	Gerhardt	Offy	22nd	17th
1967	Mallard	Offy	Failed to Qualify	
1968	Mallard	Offy	30th	30th
1969	Mallard	Offy	Failed to Qualify	
1970	Mallard	Offy	Failed to Qualify	
1971	Mallard	Offy	Qualifying Crash	
1972	Coyote	Foyt	13th	23rd
1973	Lola	Offy	Failed to Qualify	
1974	McLaren M16	Offy	28th	25th
1975	Eagle	Offy	Failed to Qualify	
1976	Mallard	Offy	Failed to Qualify	
1977	Mallard	Offy	Failed to Qualify	
1978	Mallard	Offy	Failed to Qualify	
1979	Mallard	Offy	Failed to Qualify	
1980	Mallard	Offy	Failed to Qualify	
1981	King	Offy	Failed to Qualify	

Sporting positions
Preceded by Bobby Grim	Indianapolis 500; Rookie of the Year; 1960	Succeeded by Bobby Marshman; Parnelli Jones
