= Bud Tingelstad =

American racing driver (1928–1981)

- Born: Melvin Joseph Tingelstad; April 4, 1928 Frazee, Minnesota, U.S.
- Died: July 30, 1981 (aged 53) Indianapolis, Indiana, U.S.

Champ Car career
- 118 races run over 13 years
- Years active: 1960–1972
- Best finish: 5th – 1964
- First race: 1960 Indianapolis 500 (Indianapolis)
- Last race: 1971 California 500 (Ontario)
- First win: 1966 Ted Horn Memorial (DuQuoin)
Wins	Podiums	Poles
1	8	0

Formula One World Championship career
- Active years: 1960
- Team: Trevis
- Entries: 1
- Championships: 0
- Wins: 0
- Podiums: 0
- Career points: 0
- Pole positions: 0
- Fastest laps: 0
- First entry: 1960 Indianapolis 500

Bud Tingelstad (April 4, 1928 – July 30, 1981) was an American racecar driver.

Born in Frazee, Minnesota, Tingelstad drove in the USAC Championship Car series, racing in the 1960–1971 seasons with 120 starts, including the Indianapolis 500 in each year except 1961 and 1970, attempting, but failing to qualify in both of those years and also attempting to qualify in 1972. His best Indy 500 finish was sixth in 1964. He had 56 top-ten race finishes, with his one victory in 1966 at DuQuoin. He had a best Championship points finish of fifth in 1964. He died of a heart attack in Indianapolis, Indiana.

== Complete USAC Championship Car results ==
Year	1	2	3	4	5	6	7	8	9	10	11	12	13	14	15	16	17	18	19	20	21	22	23	24	25	26	27	28	Pos	Points
1960	TRE	INDY; 9	MIL; DNQ	LAN	SPR	MIL; DNQ	DUQ	SYR; DNQ	ISF; DNQ	TRE; 14	SAC; 12	PHX; DNQ																	25th	210
1961	TRE	INDY; DNQ	MIL; DNQ	LAN	MIL; 14	SPR; DNQ	DUQ; 11	SYR; DNQ	ISF; DNQ	TRE; DNQ	SAC; DNQ	PHX																	39th	20
1962	TRE; 21	INDY; 15	MIL; 7	LAN	TRE; 9	SPR	MIL; 7	LAN	SYR; DNQ	ISF; DNQ	TRE	SAC; DNQ	PHX; DNQ																16th	240
1963	TRE	INDY; 28	MIL; 15	LAN	TRE; 9	SPR; 11	MIL; 18	DUQ; 12	ISF	TRE; 2	SAC; 13	PHX; 6																	13th	490
1964	PHX; 8	TRE; 17	INDY; 6	MIL; 3	LAN; 15	TRE; 9	SPR; 8	MIL; 4	DUQ; 8	ISF; 5	TRE; 3	SAC; 10	PHX; 4																5th	1,640
1965	PHX; 13	TRE; 4	INDY; 16	MIL; 18	LAN; 4	PPR	TRE; 15	IRP	ATL; 14	LAN; 19	MIL; 21	ISF; 7	MIL; 13	DSF; 16	INF; 14	TRE	SAC; 16	PHX; 6											20th	460
1966	PHX; 4	TRE; 5	INDY; 21	MIL; 12	LAN; 18	ATL; 28	PIP	IRP; 17	LAN; 6	SPR; 7	MIL; 11	DUQ; 1	ISF; 7	TRE; 14	SAC; 8	PHX; 25													10th	870
1967	PHX	TRE; 18	INDY; 14	MIL; 17	LAN; 8	PIP	MOS; 13	MOS; 13	IRP; 10	LAN; 9	MTR; 21	MTR	SPR; 3	MIL; 9	DUQ; 7	ISF; DNQ	TRE; 5	SAC; 8	HAN; 6	PHX; 7	RIV; 27								10th	965
1968	HAN; 18	LVG	PHX; 7	TRE; DNS	INDY; 16	MIL; 9	MOS; DNQ	MOS	LAN; 19	PIP	CDR; 13	NAZ; 13	IRP; 16	IRP; 5	LAN; 15	LAN; 2	MTR	MTR	SPR; 8	MIL; 18	DUQ; DNQ	ISF; DNQ	TRE; 3	SAC; 8	MCH; 9	HAN; 7	PHX; 10	RIV	14th	1,016
1969	PHX	HAN	INDY; 15	MIL; 4	LAN; 13	PIP	CDR; DNQ	NAZ; 4	TRE; 24	IRP; 11	IRP; 5	MIL; 15	SPR; 13	DOV; 15	DUQ; DNQ	ISF; 9	BRN	BRN	TRE; 3	SAC; DNS	KEN	KEN	PHX; 11	RIV					15th	920
1970	PHX	SON	TRE	INDY; DNQ	MIL	LAN	CDR	MCH	IRP	SPR	MIL; 25	ONT; 24	DUQ; 16	ISF	SED; DNQ	TRE; 10	SAC	PHX; 18											40th	90
1971	RAF	RAF	PHX	TRE	INDY; 7	MIL; DNQ	POC; 19	MCH	MIL	ONT; 17	TRE	PHX																	22nd	300
1972	PHX	TRE	INDY; DNQ	MIL	MCH	POC	MIL	ONT	TRE	PHX																			-	0
1974	ONT	ONT	ONT; DNS	PHX	TRE	INDY	MIL	POC	MCH	MIL	MCH	TRE	TRE	PHX															-	0

== Indy 500 results ==
Year	Car	Start	Qual	Rank	Finish	Laps	Led	Retired
1960	18	28	142.354	29	9	200	0	Running
1962	5	10	147.753	10	15	200	0	Running
1963	54	25	148.227	27	28	46	0	Crash T2
1964	15	19	151.210	26	6	198	0	Flagged
1965	5	24	154.672	23	16	115	0	Crash T3
1966	22	27	159.144	26	21	16	0	Overheating
1967	10	25	163.228	22	14	182	0	Spun FS
1968	10	18	164.444	17	16	158	0	Oil Pressure
1969	15	18	166.597	18	15	155	0	Engine
1971	58	17	170.156	24	7	198	0	Flagged
Totals						1468	0	

Starts	10
Poles	0
Front Row	0
Wins	0
Top 5	0
Top 10	3
Retired	6

== World Championship career summary ==
The Indianapolis 500 was part of the FIA World Championship from 1950 through 1960. Drivers competing at Indy during those years were credited with World Championship points and participation. Tingelstad participated in one World Championship race but scored no World Championship points.
