= Jim McElreath =

American racing driver (1928–2017)

- Born: Jimmie Earl McElreath; February 18, 1928 Arlington, Texas, U.S.
- Died: May 18, 2017 (aged 89) Arlington, Texas, U.S.

Championship titles
- Major victories California 500 (1970)

Champ Car career
- 181 races run over 24 years
- Best finish: 2nd (1966)
- First race: 1961 Hoosier Hundred (ISF)
- Last race: 1983 Ted Horn Memorial (DuQuoin)
- First win: 1965 Trenton 100 (Trenton)
- Last win: 1970 California 500 (Ontario)
Wins	Podiums	Poles
5	22	2

NASCAR Cup Series career
- 4 races run over 2 years
- First race: 1964 Daytona Qualifier #2 (Daytona)
- Last race: 1971 Miller High Life 500 (Ontario)
Wins	Top tens	Poles
0	0	0

Jimmie Earl McElreath (February 18, 1928 – May 18, 2017) was an American open-wheel racing driver, known for competing in the USAC Championship car series. He won the inaugural California 500 in 1970, driving a spare car owned by A. J. Foyt.

== Racing career ==
McElreath began his racing career in 1945 at the age of 17. He raced stock cars in Dallas, Texas. McElreath would race in the local Texas bullrings for the next fifteen years while working as a bricklayer. It was in 1960 when he and fellow Texan racer Johnny Rutherford decided to race in the Midwest. Both would eventually find super modified rides in the International Motor Contest Association (IMCA). McElreath did well enough that by late-summer 1961 that he was offered a ride by fame car owner Lindsey Hopkins in the Hoosier Hundred, a race at the Indiana State Fairgrounds on the United States Auto Club (USAC) National Championship Trail. He finished third in this race, an impressive start to his Indy Car career.

McElreath raced in the 1961–1983 seasons, with 178 combined career starts, including 15 in the Indianapolis 500 in 1962–1970, 1973–1974, and 1977–1980. He finished 48 times in the top-five, with five victories. He was runner-up in the 1966 championship and third in 1963, 1965, and 1970. In 1962, he was named Indianapolis 500 Rookie of the Year, a result of his sixth-place finish.

McElreath won the inaugural California 500 at Ontario, California on September 6, 1970, driving A.J. Foyt's team car. He battled with Art Pollard for the last 10 laps after Al Unser and Cale Yarborough retired with mechanical issues.

== Award ==
McElreath was a 2002 inductee to the National Sprint Car Hall of Fame.

== Personal life ==
McElreath's son, James Jr., was killed in a sprint car crash at Winchester in October 1977. James Jr. had attempted to qualify for the 1977 Indy 500 earlier that year. Alongside his father, they were attempting to become the first father and son combination to qualify for the same race. However, James Jr. was too slow to make the field.

McElreath's daughter, Shirley, married racing driver Tony Bettenhausen Jr. The couple died when their private plane crashed in Kentucky in February 2000.

== Complete USAC Championship Car results ==
Year	1	2	3	4	5	6	7	8	9	10	11	12	13	14	15	16	17	18	19	20	21	22	23	24	25	26	27	28	Pos	Points
1961	TRE	INDY	MIL	LAN	MIL	SPR	DUQ	SYR	ISF; 3	TRE; 21	SAC; 10	PHX; 4																	18th	290
1962	TRE; 16	INDY; 6	MIL; 14	LAN; 7	TRE; 6	SPR; 5	MIL; 5	LAN; 7	SYR; 10	ISF; 3	TRE; 8	SAC; 14	PHX; DNQ																8th	1,210
1963	TRE; 4	INDY; 6	MIL; 5	LAN; 2	TRE; 8	SPR; 6	MIL; 11	DUQ; 7	ISF; 5	TRE; 4	SAC; 3	PHX; 3																	3rd	1,655
1964	PHX; 11	TRE; DNQ	INDY; 21	MIL; 9	LAN; 4	TRE; 14	SPR; DNQ	MIL; 12	DUQ; 5	ISF; DNQ	TRE; 12	SAC	PHX; 25																18th	320
1965	PHX; 2	TRE; 1	INDY; 20	MIL; 3	LAN; 1	PPR	TRE; 11	IRP; 5	ATL; 10	LAN; 1	MIL; 14	ISF; 5	MIL; 6	DSF; 2	INF; DNQ	TRE; 3	SAC; 8	PHX; 23											3rd	2,035
1966	PHX; 1	TRE; 3	INDY; 3	MIL; 21	LAN; 2	ATL; 12	PIP	IRP; 3	LAN; 22	SPR; 11	MIL; 4	DUQ; 10	ISF; 10	TRE; 6	SAC; 7	PHX; 3													2nd	2,430
1967	PHX; 15	TRE; 4	INDY; 5	MIL; 4	LAN; 11	PIP	MOS; Wth	MOS	IRP; 4	LAN; 5	MTR; 12	MTR; 16	SPR; 12	MIL; 6	DUQ; 15	ISF; 5	TRE; 4	SAC; DNS	HAN; 12	PHX; 20	RIV; DNS								7th	1,750
1968	HAN	LVG	PHX	TRE	INDY; 14	MIL; DNQ	MOS	MOS	LAN	PIP	CDR; 22	NAZ	IRP; 10	IRP; 11	LAN; 7	LAN; 17	MTR; 7	MTR; 10	SPR	MIL; 9	DUQ	ISF	TRE; 15	SAC	MCH; DNQ	HAN; 5	PHX; 6	RIV; 28	21st	771
1969	PHX; DNP	HAN	INDY; 28	MIL	LAN	PIP	CDR	NAZ	TRE; 7	IRP; 13	IRP; 20	MIL; 8	SPR; DNQ	DOV; 18	DUQ; 9	ISF; 13	BRN; DNQ	BRN	TRE; 11	SAC; 16	KEN	KEN	PHX; 9	RIV					23rd	400
1970	PHX; 6	SON	TRE; 7	INDY; 5	MIL; DNS	LAN	CDR	MCH	IRP	SPR; 3	MIL	ONT; 1	DUQ; Wth	ISF; 10	SED; 13	TRE; DNP	SAC; 16	PHX; 5											3rd	2,060
1971	RAF	RAF	PHX	TRE	INDY; DNQ	MIL	POC; 27	MCH	MIL	ONT; 8	TRE; 27	PHX; 6																	21st	370
1972	PHX	TRE; DNQ	INDY; DNQ	MIL; 10	MCH	POC; DNQ	MIL	ONT; DNS	TRE	PHX																			39th	45
1973	TWS	TRE	TRE	INDY; 23	MIL; 11	POC; 11	MCH	MIL; 4	ONT; 6	ONT	ONT; 20	MCH	MCH	TRE; 5	TWS	PHX; 16													19th	650
1974	ONT; 4	ONT	ONT; 15	PHX; 10	TRE; 18	INDY; 6	MIL; 7	POC; 23	MCH	MIL	MCH	TRE	TRE	PHX; 10															13th	700
1975	ONT	ONT	ONT; 18	PHX	TRE; DNS	INDY	MIL	POC	MCH	MIL	MCH	TRE	PHX; 7																30th	90
1976	PHX; 10	TRE	INDY; DNQ	MIL	POC	MCH	TWS	TRE	MIL	ONT; DNQ	MCH	TWS	PHX																36th	45
1977	ONT	PHX	TWS	TRE	INDY; 23	MIL	POC; 24	MOS	MCH; 12	TWS; 6	MIL	ONT; 9	MCH; 5	PHX															21st	530
1978	PHX	ONT	TWS; 6	TRE; 7	INDY; 20	MOS	MIL	POC; 25	MCH; 7	ATL; 13	TWS; 12	MIL; 12	ONT; 20	MCH; 9	TRE; DNQ	SIL	BRH	PHX; 12											19th	573
1979	ONT; 9	TWS; 14	INDY; 35	MIL	POC; 2	TWS; 9	MIL; DNQ																						6th	975
1980	ONT	INDY; 24	MIL	POC; 27	MOH																								45th	25
1981-82	INDY; DNQ	POC; 7	ILL; 3	DUQ; 17	ISF; 24	INDY; DNQ																							12th	594
1983-84	DUQ; 29	INDY																											-	0

== Complete PPG Indy Car World Series results ==
Year	Team	1	2	3	4	5	6	7	8	9	10	11	12	13	14	15	16	Pos.	Pts	Ref
1979	McElreath Racing	PHX	ATL	ATL	INDY; 35	TRE	TRE	MCH	MCH	WGL	TRE	ONT	MCH	ATL	PHX			-	0	
1980	McElreath Racing	ONT	INDY; 24	MIL				WGL; 12	MIL; 9	ONT	MCH	MEX; 6	PHX					28th	240	
1980	Grant King Racing				POC; 27	MOH	MCH											28th	240	
1981	McElreath Racing	PHX; 19	MIL	ATL	ATL	MCH	RIV	MIL	MCH; 11	WGL; DNQ	MEX; 13	PHX; DNQ						36th	4	
1982		PHX; DNQ	ATL	MIL	CLE	MCH	MIL	POC; 18	RIV; DNQ	ROA	MCH	PHX						39th	3	
1983		ATL; 11	INDY	MIL	CLE	MCH; 13	ROA	POC; 23	RIV	MOH; DNP	MCH	CPL	LAG	PHX				30th	2	
1984	Dale Coyne Racing	LBH	PHX; DNQ	INDY	MIL	POR	MEA	CLE	MCH	ROA	POC	MOH	SAN	MCH	PHX	LAG	CPL	-	0	

== Indianapolis 500 results ==
Year	Chassis	Engine	Start	Finish
1962	Kurtis Kraft	Offenhauser	7th	6th
1963	Watson	Offenhauser	6th	6th
1964	Kurtis Kraft	Novi	26th	21st
1965	Brabham	Offenhauser	16th	20th
1966	Brabham	Ford	7th	3rd
1967	Moore	Ford	11th	5th
1968	Coyote	Ford	13th	14th
1969	Brawner Hawk	Offenhauser	7th	28th
1970	Coyote	Ford	33rd	5th
1971	Coyote	Ford	Did not qualify	
1972	Coyote	Foyt	Did not qualify	
1973	Eagle	Offenhauser	33rd	23rd
1974	Eagle	Offenhauser	30th	6th
1976	Eagle	Offenhauser	Did not qualify	
1977	Eagle	AMC	20th	23rd
1978	Eagle	Offenhauser	26th	20th
1979	Penske Racing	Cosworth	19th	35th
1980	Penske Racing	Cosworth	11th	24th
1981	Penske Racing	Cosworth	Sold Car	
1982	King	Chevrolet	Did not qualify	

== Notes ==
Sporting positions
Preceded by Bobby Marshman; Parnelli Jones	Indianapolis 500; Rookie of the Year; 1962	Succeeded by Jim Clark
