= Phillips (constructor) =

Phillips was an American racing car constructor. Phillips cars competed in seven FIA World Championship races - the 1954-1960 Indianapolis 500.

== World Championship Indianapolis 500 results ==
Season	Driver	Grid	Classification	Points	Note	Race Report
1954	Don Freeland	6	7			Report
1955	Don Freeland	21	15			Report
1956	Don Freeland	26	3	4		Report
1957	Bob Veith	16	9			Report
1958	Don Freeland	13	7			Report
1959	Don Branson	10	24		Suspension	Report
1960	Don Branson	8	4	3		Report
