= Don Branson =

American racing driver (1920–1966)

- Born: Donald Laverne Branson; June 2, 1920 Rantoul, Illinois, U.S.
- Died: November 12, 1966 (aged 46) Gardena, California, U.S.

Champ Car career
- 125 races run over 11 years
- Years active: 1956–1966
- Best finish: 3rd – 1960
- First race: 1956 Springfield 100 (Springfield)
- Last race: 1966 Golden State 100 (Sacramento)
- First win: 1962 Langhorne 100 (Langhorne)
- Last win: 1966 Tony Bettenhausen Memorial (Springfield)
Wins	Podiums	Poles
6	26	15

Formula One World Championship career
- Active years: 1959–1960
- Team: Phillips
- Entries: 2
- Career points: 3
- First entry: 1959 Indianapolis 500
- Last entry: 1960 Indianapolis 500

Donald L. Branson (June 2, 1920 – November 12, 1966) was an American racecar driver.

== Career ==
Born in Rantoul, Illinois, Branson drove in the USAC Championship Car series and also in sprint cars, racing champ cars in the 1956–1966 seasons with 128 starts, including the 1959–1966 Indianapolis 500 races. He finished in the top-ten 85 times, with seven victories.

Branson was also the 1959 and 1964 USAC Sprint Car Series Champion.

Branson was killed in 1966 in a crash at a sprint car race at Ascot Park in Gardena, California, which also claimed the life of fellow driver Dick Atkins. The fatal wreck occurred with only a few races left in the season for the USAC series.

== Awards ==
He was inducted in the National Sprint Car Hall of Fame in 1994 and the National Midget Auto Racing Hall of Fame in 2012.

== Complete USAC Championship Car results ==
Year	1	2	3	4	5	6	7	8	9	10	11	12	13	14	15	16	17	18	Pos	Points
1956	INDY	MIL	LAN	DAR	ATL	SPR; 11	MIL; 26	DUQ; 10	SYR; 15	ISF; DNQ	SAC	PHX							31st	50
1957	INDY	LAN; 9	MIL; 21	DET; 10	ATL; 8	SPR; 11	MIL; DNQ	DUQ; 9	SYR; DNS	ISF; 5	TRE; 19	SAC	PHX						19th	280
1958	TRE	INDY	MIL; DNQ	LAN; 4	ATL; 5	SPR; 7	MIL; 12	DUQ; 3	SYR; 6	ISF; 4	TRE; 6	SAC; 12	PHX; 7						9th	790
1959	DAY; 11	TRE; 13	INDY; 24	MIL; 9	LAN; 9	SPR; 2	MIL	DUQ; 2	SYR; 2	ISF; 17	TRE; 5	SAC; 5	PHX; 15						7th	780
1960	TRE; 22	INDY; 4	MIL; 22	LAN; 15	SPR; 7	MIL; 19	DUQ; 8	SYR; 12	ISF; 4	TRE; 4	SAC; 3	PHX; 4							3rd	1.220
1961	TRE; 16	INDY; 33	MIL; 6	LAN; 14	MIL; 24	SPR; 15	DUQ; 6	SYR; 17	ISF; 8	TRE; 4	SAC; 7	PHX; 3							12th	530
1962	TRE; 4	INDY; 12	MIL; 17	LAN; 4	TRE; 2	SPR; 3	MIL; 25	LAN; 1	SYR; 7	ISF; 2	TRE; 1	SAC; 2	PHX; 8						4th	1,700
1963	TRE; 17	INDY; 5	MIL; 17	LAN; DNS	TRE; 12	SPR; 3	MIL; 10	DUQ; 5	ISF; 2	TRE; 5	SAC; 6	PHX; 7							5th	1,352
1964	PHX; 4	TRE	INDY; 12	MIL; 15	LAN; 2	TRE; 3	SPR; 3	MIL; 13	DUQ; 3	ISF; 3	TRE; 2	SAC; 3	PHX; 3						4th	1,700
1965	PHX; 1	TRE; 13	INDY; 8	MIL; 20	LAN; 15	PIP	TRE; 4	IRP; 6	ATL; 8	LAN; 6	MIL; 6	SPR; 6	MIL; 25	DUQ; 1	ISF; 13	TRE; 15	SAC; 1	PHX; 5	4th	1,875
1966	PHX; 16	TRE; 10	INDY; 23	MIL; 15	LAN; 4	ATL; 6	PIP	IRP; 9	LAN; 5	SPR; 1	MIL; 23	DUQ; 6	ISF; 4	TRE; 23	SAC; 4	PHX			7th	1.135

== Indianapolis 500 results ==
Year	Car	Start	Qual	Rank	Finish	Laps	Led	Retired
1959	9	10	143.312	12	24	112	0	Torsion bar
1960	7	8	144.753	11	4	200	0	Running
1961	3	2	146.843	3	33	2	0	Bent Valves
1962	14	11	147.312	11	12	200	0	Running
1963	4	3	150.188	4	5	200	0	Running
1964	5	9	152.672	12	12	187	0	Clutch
1965	4	18	155.501	16	8	197	0	Flagged
1966	4	9	160.385	12	23	0	0	Crash FS
Totals						1098	0	

Starts	8
Poles	0
Front Row	2
Wins	0
Top 5	2
Top 10	3
Retired	4

== Complete Formula One World Championship results ==
(key)

Year	Entrant	Chassis	Engine	1	2	3	4	5	6	7	8	9	10	WDC	Points
1959	Bob Estes	Phillips	Offenhauser L4	MON	500; 24	NED	FRA	GBR	GER	POR	ITA	USA		NC	0
1960	Bob Estes	Phillips	Offenhauser L4	ARG	MON	500; 4	NED	BEL	FRA	GBR	POR	ITA	USA	21st	3
