= George Landry =

American engineer

George A. Landry (1890 – January 30, 1961) was an American engineer who served as the first director of Sandia Laboratory and the first president of Sandia Corporation (a subsidiary of Western Electric which managed the laboratories). Prior to serving as director, he worked for Western Electric Company.

== Early life and career ==
Landry was born in Rouses Point, New York and graduated cum laude from the University of Vermont in 1911. He worked for Western Electric Company shortly after graduation, serving in a variety of management positions. He was named to the War Production Board shortly after the start of World War II, and subsequently served as the first director of Sandia Laboratory (October 1949 to February 1952). In 1953, he was appointed assistant director of the Office of Defense Mobilization where he served until his retirement in 1958.
