= Gary Congdon =

American racing driver (1937–1967)

- Born: Gary Paul Congdon; February 18, 1937 Palmyra, Wisconsin, U.S.
- Died: September 24, 1967 (aged 30) Terre Haute, Indiana, U.S.

Champ Car career
- 28 races run over 3 years
- Best finish: 20th (1966)
- First race: 1965 Trenton 150 (Trenton)
- Last race: 1967 Tony Bettenhausen; 200 (Milwaukee)
Wins	Podiums	Poles
0	0	0

Gary Paul Congdon (February 18, 1937 – September 24, 1967) was an American racing driver.

Born in Palmyra, Wisconsin, Congdon died at the Autumn 50 in Terre Haute, Indiana in a crash during a midget car race. He drove in the USAC Championship Car series, racing in the 1965 through 1967 seasons, with 29 career starts, including the 1966 Indianapolis 500. He finished in the top-ten eight times, with a best finish of fourth position in 1966 at Langhorne Speedway. He was the father of two children.

== Motorsports career results ==
=== Indianapolis 500 results ===
Year	Car	Start	Qual	Rank	Finish	Laps	Led	Retired
1966	53	16	158.688	29	25	0	0	Crash FS
Totals						0	0	

Starts	1
Poles	0
Front Row	0
Wins	0
Top 5	0
Top 10	0
Retired	1
