= Charlie Brockman =

Charles Thurston Brockman (December 8, 1927 – January 18, 2005) was an American broadcaster and was a president of the United States Auto Club from 1969 to 1972.

== Biography ==
Brockman worked as a sportscaster on WXLW, WIRE and worked as sports director at WLWI (now WTHR) in Indianapolis, Indiana. From 1964-1970, he anchored the MCA closed-circuit television broadcasts of the Indianapolis 500. He worked on ABC's Wide World of Sports, and anchored the broadcast of the 1965 Indianapolis 500. He also was one of the 3 appeals panelists for Bobby Unser's appeal of his 1-lap penalty following the 1981 Indianapolis 500. Brockman was the only panelist to uphold USAC's penalty, although he also dissented with the panel's decision to not penalize runner-up Mario Andretti for a similar infraction.

Preceded by None	Television voice of the Indianapolis 500; 1965	Succeeded by Chris Schenkel
