= Al Miller (racing driver, born 1921) =

American racing driver

- Born: Albert Krulac; November 23, 1921; Detroit, Michigan, U.S.
- Died: July 28, 1978 (aged 56)
- Occupation: racecar driver

Al Miller (November 23, 1921 – July 28, 1978) was an American race car driver.

Born Albert Krulac in Detroit, Michigan, Miller died in Mount Clemens, Michigan. He drove in the USAC Championship Car series, racing in the 1962, 1963, 1965–1967 and 1970 seasons, with 31 career starts, including the Indianapolis 500 races in 1963 (in a John Crosthwaite designed car) and 1965 to 1967. He finished in the top-ten five times, with his best finish in fourth position in the 1965 Indianapolis 500.

He was not related to Al Miller, who raced at Indianapolis in the 1930s and 1940s.

== Indianapolis 500 results ==
Year	Car	Start	Qual	Rank	Finish	Laps	Led	Retired
1963	84	31	149.613	9	9	200	0	Running
1965	74	7	157.805	7	4	200	0	Running
1966	75	30	158.681	30	30	0	0	Crash FS
1967	32	33	162.602	31	28	74	0	Oil Cooler
Totals						474	0	

Starts	4
Poles	0
Front Row	0
Wins	0
Top 5	1
Top 10	2
Retired	2
