= Chuck Hulse =

American racing driver (1927–2020)

Chuck Norton Hulse (October 3, 1927 – July 13, 2020) was an American racecar driver.

Hulse raced in the USAC Championship Car series in the 1959-1964 and 1966-1968 seasons, with 60 career starts, including the Indianapolis 500 races in 1962, 1963, 1966 and 1967. He finished in the top-ten 26 times, with his best finish in sec-nd position in 1963 at Phoenix and 1966 at Sacramento. Hulse stopped driving for two years in 1964-1966 due to vision problems caused in a sprint car accident in New Bremen, Ohio.

Hulse died on July 13, 2020, aged 92 years.

== Indianapolis 500 results ==
Year	Chassis	Engine	Start	Finish
1960	Kurtis Kraft	Offy	Practice Crash	
1961	Kurtis Kraft	Offy	Practice Crash	
1962	Kurtis Kraft	Offy	16th	21st
1963	Ewing	Offy	11th	8th
1966	Watson	Ford	8th	20th
1967	Lola	Offy	27th	7th
1968	Watson	Ford	Practice Crash	
