= Art Malone =

- Born: June 3, 1936; Tampa, Florida, U.S.
- Died: March 29, 2013 (aged 76); Tampa, Florida, U.S.
- Achievements: 1963 AHRA Top Fuel Champion AHRA Hall of Fame First driver to exceed 180 mph (290 km/h) on an oval track

NASCAR Cup Series career
- 2 races run over 2 years
- Best finish: 65th (1962)
- First race: 1961 Old Dominion 500 (Martinsville)
- Last race: 1962 Firecracker 250 (Daytona)
Wins	Top tens	Poles
0	2	0

Art Malone

Champ Car career
- 10 races run over 4 years
- First race: 1962 Bobby Ball Memorial (Phoenix)
- Last race: 1965 Tony Bettenhausen 200 (Milwaukee)
Wins	Podiums	Poles
0	0	0

Arthur Malone (June 3, 1936 – March 29, 2013) was an American race car driver who was successful in both drag racing and American open-wheel car racing, an unusual combination of skills.

== Career ==
Malone is known primarily for having been a drag racer and was the 1963 AHRA Top Fuel World champion. In 1959, he drove for Don Garlits. On August 23, 1959, he set a Standard 1320 speed record of 183.66 mph (295.57 km/h). He is in the AHRA Hall of Fame.

Malone was the first to attain 180 miles per hour (290 km/h) at Daytona International Speedway.

Malone also raced in the USAC Championship Car series in the 1962-1965 seasons, with ten career starts, including the 1963 and 1964 Indianapolis 500 races. Both years Malone drove cars powered by the legendary Novi engine, owned by Andy Granatelli. He had gained Granatelli's attention after his Daytona record. Art Malone's best finish at Indy came in 1964, where he started the race in 30th position, and finished a very respectable 11th.

== Collision and death ==
Malone was injured in an airboat collision in the early 2010s; failing to fully recover from his injuries, he died on March 29, 2013, at the age of 76.
