= Bob Mathouser =

American racecar driver

Bob Mathouser (March 15, 1926 – November 15, 1980), was an American racecar driver.

Born in Omaha, Nebraska, Mathouser died in Los Angeles, California. He drove in the USAC Championship Car series, racing in the 1961-1966 seasons, with 30 career starts, including the 1964 Indianapolis 500. He finished in the top-ten four times, with his best finish in sixth position in 1964 at Langhorne.

== See also ==
- Sports in Omaha, Nebraska
