= Atlanta 500 Classic =

1998-2001 Indy Racing Event

Indy Racing League
- Venue: Atlanta Motor Speedway
- First race: 1965
- First ICS race: 1998
- Last race: 2001
- Distance: 515.505 km (320.32 mi)
- Laps: 208
- Most wins (driver): Rick Mears (5)
- Most wins (team): Penske Racing (5)

The Atlanta 500 Classic was an Indy Racing League event held at the Atlanta Motor Speedway from 1998 until 2001.

Previous USAC and CART races had been held at the track dating to 1965. The first National Championship races in Atlanta were held at Atlanta Motordrome, a 2-mile (3.2 km) dirt oval, in 1910. Later AAA and USAC races were held at Lakewood Speedway, a dirt oval in Atlanta.

== Past winners ==
=== Atlanta Motordrome ===
Year	Date	Race Name	Winner	Car
American Automobile Association
1910	May 5	Atlanta Speedway Trophy	Ray Harroun	Marmon
1910	May 6	Atlanta Race 2	Bill Endicott	Cole
1910	May 6	Atlanta Race 3	Herbert Lytle	American
1910	May 7	Atlanta Automobile Association Trophy	Tom Kincade/Johnny Aitken^{A}	National

^A Shared drive

=== Lakewood Speedway ===
Year	Date	Race name	Winner	Chassis	Engine
American Automobile Association
1946	March 31	Mike Benton Sweepstakes (non-points)	Jimmy Wilburn		Offy
1946	June 2	Lakewood Race 1	Ted Horn		Offy
1946	July 4	Lakewood Race 2	Ted Horn	Wetteroth	Offy
1946	July 7	Lakewood Race 3	Ted Horn		Offy
1946	September 2	Atlanta 100	George Connor	Kurtis Kraft	Offy
1946	September 28	Lakewood Race 5	Ted Horn		Offy
1946	October 5	Lakewood Race 6	Bill Holland		Offy
1947	July 4	Atlanta 100	Walt Ader	Adams	Offy
1948	September 6	Atlanta 100	Mel Hansen	Wetteroth	Offy
1949–1951: Not held
NASCAR Speedway Division
1952	June 8	Atlanta 100	Al Keller	?	Cadillac
1953–1955: Not held
USAC Championship Car
1956	July 14	Atlanta 100	Eddie Sachs	Hillegass	Offy
1957	July 4	Atlanta 100	George Amick	Lesovsky	Offy
1958	July 4	Atlanta 100	Jud Larson	Watson	Offy

=== Atlanta Motor Speedway ===
Season	Date	Race Name	Driver	Team	Chassis	Engine	Race Distance		Race Time	Average Speed (mph)
Season	Date	Race Name	Driver	Team	Chassis	Engine	Laps	Miles (km)	Race Time	Average Speed (mph)
USAC Championship Car
1965	Aug 1	Atlanta 250	(United States) Johnny Rutherford	Leader Card Racing	A. J. Watson	Ford	167	250.5 (403.14)	1:46:03	141.728
1966	June 26	Atlanta 300	(United States) Mario Andretti	Clint Brawner	Brawner Hawk	Ford	200	300 (482.803)	2:09:12	139.319
1967 – 1977	Not held									
1978	July 23	Gould Twin Dixie	(United States) Rick Mears	Penske Racing	Penske	Cosworth	100	152.2 (244.942)	1:03:44	141.215
CART Championship Car
1979	April 22	Gould Twin Dixie 125	(United States) Johnny Rutherford	Bruce McLaren Motor Racing	McLaren	Cosworth	82	124.804 (200.852)	0:47:28	157.758
1979	April 22	Gould Twin Dixie 125	(United States) Johnny Rutherford	Bruce McLaren Motor Racing	McLaren	Cosworth	82	124.804 (200.852)	0:45:40	166.159
1979	Sept 30	Rich's Atlanta Classic	(United States) Rick Mears	Penske Racing	Penske	Cosworth	100	152.2 (244.942)	0:50:09	182.094
1980	Not held									
1981	June 21	Kraco Twin 125	(United States) Rick Mears	Penske Racing	Penske	Cosworth	83	126.326 (203.301)	0:51:29	147.22
1981	June 21	Kraco Twin 125	(United States) Rick Mears	Penske Racing	Penske	Cosworth	83	126.326 (203.301)	0:45:20	167.073
1982	May 1	Stroh's 200	(United States) Rick Mears	Penske Racing	Penske	Cosworth	132	200.904 (323.323)	1:13:10	164.75
1983	April 17	Kraco Dixie 200	(United States) Gordon Johncock	Patrick Racing	Wildcat	Cosworth	132	200.904 (323.323)	1:22:29	146.133
1984 – 1997	Not held									
Indy Racing League
1998	Aug 29	Atlanta 500 Classic	(Sweden) Kenny Bräck	A. J. Foyt Enterprises	Dallara	Oldsmobile	208	320.32 (515.505)	2:17:05	140.026
1999	July 17	Kobalt Mechanics Tools 500; Presented by MCI WorldCom	(United States) Scott Sharp	Kelley Racing	Dallara	Oldsmobile	208	320.32 (515.505)	2:12:15	141.546
2000	July 15	Midas 500 Classic	(United States) Greg Ray	Team Menard	Dallara	Oldsmobile	208	320.32 (515.505)	2:02:02	153.403
2001	April 28	zMax 500	(United States) Greg Ray	Team Menard	Dallara	Oldsmobile	200	308 (495.677)	2:14:41	133.647
