= Indianapolis 500 Evolution =

2009 racing video game

- Developer(s): Brain in a Jar
- Publisher(s): NA: Destineer; EU: Zushi Games
- Platform(s): Xbox 360
- Release: NA: September 30, 2009; EU: February 19, 2010
- Genre(s): Racing game
- Mode(s): Single-player, multiplayer

Indianapolis 500 Evolution is a racing game, developed by British studio Brain in a Jar Ltd, based on the Indianapolis 500 and American Championship car racing from 1961 to 1971. It is similar to Destineer's 2007 game Indianapolis 500 Legends. In the game, players take on the roles of various famous racers from that time period with 21 missions, photos, and movies, as well as competing on courses such as the Indianapolis Motor Speedway, as well as the Milwaukee Mile, Trenton, Riverside, Hanford and Langhorne Speedway. Honey Creek, the name for inner road course of the Milwaukee Mile, is also included, and is still used for various club racing events in the present day.

== Career ==
The Career lasts between 1961 and 1971 and also features the "rear-engine revolution" and the final roadster to race at the Indy 500 in 1968. The game also includes 21 missions that reward the player credits for use in career mode, photos and movies of the Indy 500 between 1961 and 1971.

== Indy 500 events from 1961 to 1971 ==
1961 - New Pennock Grandstands and Jack Brabham's Cooper-Climax that finished 9th in the 1961 Indy 500. New rookies such as Roger McCluskey, Bobby Marshman, and Parnelli Jones are introduced.

1962 - The final strip of bricks left on the start-finish line, 150 mph (240 km/h) qualification speed, and Mickey Thompson's rear-engined Buick racer driven by rookie Dan Gurney.

1963 - Introduction of the "rear-engine revolution" and Team Lotus, Jim Hurtubise driving a Novi-powered car, and Jim Clark's and Dan Gurney's Lotus cars.

1964 - Decline of the front-engine roadsters begin as the Halibrand, Huffaker, and Brabham cars are introduced to replace the aging roadsters that dominated Indy since 1911.

1965 - The tragic deaths of Eddie Sachs and Dave McDonald after the 1964 Indy 500 forced the fuel to be changed from gasoline to methanol. The fuel was in fire protective tanks off to the sides of the car with two mandatory pit stops to avoid such a tragic crash. The tanks were smaller in size compared to years previous. Only a handful of front-engine roadsters remains as the rear-engine cars keep dominating the circuit. The fuel change would not happen again in Indy history until 2005 when the fuel was changed to ethanol, which is what the Indy cars run on today.

1966 - With Bobby Grim remaining as one of the final front-engine roadster drivers, the rear-engine cars also gain a few drivers from Europe such as Jim Clark, Sir Jackie Stewart and Graham Hill from the Formula One series. This also marks the 50th Indy 500 event.

1967 - Andy Granatelli introduces the STP-Paxton Turbocar, while most of the field remains in rear-engined cars. Even though the turbine-powered car lacked handling, it almost won the 1967 Indy 500 until it broke down with eight miles to go. The problem was caused by a transmission bearing. In 1968, the Turbocar crashed into the wall during qualifying at Indy. Today it is now a museum gem of Indy's two brief years of turbine power. This also marks the first Indy race to not feature a front-engine roadster.

1968 - Lotus introduces its turbine-powered Lotus 56, while the turbocharged Offenhauser engine is still being used in many Indy rear-engined cars. Jim Hurtubise qualifies a front-engine roadster for the roadster's last time in Indy history.

1969 - With the turbine-powered cars and front-engined roadsters completely gone, the Indy cars have two choices for engines, both turbocharged: Offenhauser and Ford. However, the Ford engine suffered from high temperatures during racing, qualifying, and practice so most drivers stuck with the turbocharged Offenhauser. Also, the Indy cars now gain aerodynamic enhancements to improve grip and speed.

1970 - Offenhauser and Ford engines dominate the field while the aerodynamics between the 1961 front-engine roadsters and the 1970 rear-engine cars are also mentioned. 170 mph (270 km/h) qualification speeds also play a big role in the entire Indy 500 field.

1971 - With all the aerodynamic enhancements to the car, the Coyote is introduced as the first Indy car to handle the four turns at over 180 mph (290 km/h) and straight-line speed at over 200 mph (320 km/h).
