= 1964 USAC Championship Car season =

Sports season

- USAC National Championship Trail

Season
- Races: 13
- Start date: March 22
- End date: November 22

Awards
- National champion: (United States) A. J. Foyt
- Indianapolis 500 winner: (United States) A. J. Foyt

The 1964 USAC Championship Car season consisted of 13 races, beginning in Avondale, Arizona on March 22 and concluding at the same location on November 22. There was also one non-championship event at Pikes Peak, Colorado. The USAC National Champion and Indianapolis 500 winner was A. J. Foyt. At Indianapolis in the 500 mile race Eddie Sachs and Dave MacDonald were killed during lap 2 of the race; Sachs was 37 years old, and MacDonald was 27. In the Tony Bettenhausen Memorial at Springfield, Bill Horstmeyer died during the race; he was 34 years old. In November, five days after the season ended, Bobby Marshman died in a testing accident at Phoenix; he was 28 years old.

== Schedule and results ==
Rnd	Date	Race name	Track	Location	Type	Pole position	Winning driver
1	March 22	(United States) Phoenix 100	Phoenix International Raceway	Avondale, Arizona	Paved	(United States) Parnelli Jones	(United States) A. J. Foyt
2	April 19	(United States) Trenton 100	Trenton International Speedway	Trenton, New Jersey	Paved	(United States) A. J. Foyt	(United States) A. J. Foyt
3	May 30	(United States) International 500 Mile Sweepstakes	Indianapolis Motor Speedway	Speedway, Indiana	Paved	(United Kingdom) Jim Clark	(United States) A. J. Foyt
4	June 7	(United States) Rex Mays Classic	Milwaukee Mile	West Allis, Wisconsin	Paved	(United States) Rodger Ward	(United States) A. J. Foyt
5	June 21	(United States) Langhorne 100	Langhorne Speedway	Langhorne, Pennsylvania	Dirt	(United States) Johnny Rutherford	(United States) A. J. Foyt
NC	July 4	(United States) Pikes Peak Auto Hill Climb	Pikes Peak Highway	Pikes Peak, Colorado	Hill	(United States) Bobby Unser^{A}	(United States) Al Unser
6	July 19	(United States) Trenton 150	Trenton International Speedway	Trenton, New Jersey	Paved	(United States) Jim McElreath	(United States) A. J. Foyt
7	August 22	(United States) Tony Bettenhausen Memorial	Illinois State Fairgrounds	Springfield, Illinois	Dirt	(United States) Rodger Ward	(United States) A. J. Foyt
8	August 23	(United States) Tony Bettenhausen 200	Milwaukee Mile	West Allis, Wisconsin	Paved	(United States) Parnelli Jones	(United States) Parnelli Jones
9	September 7	(United States) Ted Horn Memorial	DuQuoin State Fairgrounds	Du Quoin, Illinois	Dirt	(United States) Don Branson	(United States) A. J. Foyt
10	September 26	(United States) Hoosier Hundred	Indiana State Fairgrounds	Indianapolis, Indiana	Dirt	(United States) A. J. Foyt	(United States) A. J. Foyt
11	September 27	(United States) Trenton 200	Trenton International Speedway	Trenton, New Jersey	Paved	(United States) Parnelli Jones	(United States) Parnelli Jones
12	October 25	(United States) Golden State 100	California State Fairgrounds	Sacramento, California	Dirt	(United States) Parnelli Jones	(United States) A. J. Foyt
13	November 22	(United States) Bobby Ball Memorial	Phoenix International Raceway	Avondale, Arizona	Paved	(United States) Parnelli Jones	(United States) Lloyd Ruby

Paved/Dirt Oval
Road Course/Hill Climb
Non-championship race

^A No pole is awarded for the Pikes Peak Hill Climb, in this schedule on the pole is the driver who started first. No lap led was awarded for the Pikes Peak Hill Climb, however, a lap was awarded to the drivers that completed the climb.

== Final points standings ==
Pos	Driver	PHX1 (United States)	TRE1 (United States)	INDY (United States)	MIL1 (United States)	LHS (United States)	TRE2 (United States)	SPR (United States)	MIL2 (United States)	DQSF (United States)	ISF (United States)	TRE3 (United States)	CSF (United States)	PHX2 (United States)	Pts
1	(United States) A. J. Foyt	1	**1**	1	1	1	1	1	26	1	**1**	20	1	19	2900
2	(United States) Rodger Ward	5	18	2	**13**		7	**15**	2	13	2	4	4	2	2128
3	(United States) Lloyd Ruby	9	5	3	18	8	2	12	10	17	9	26	5	1	1752
4	(United States) Don Branson	4		12	15	2	3	3	13	**3**	3	2	3	3	1700
5	(United States) Bud Tingelstad	8	17	6	3	15	9	8	4	8	5	3	10	4	1640
6	(United States) Parnelli Jones	**3**	19	23			DNQ	13	**1**	16	17	**1**	**16**	**17**	940
7	(United States) Bobby Marshman	7	3	25	21	3	22	2	24	2	16	16	2	13	867
8	(United States) Norm Hall	12	7	33	8	11	5	DNQ	11	12	11	5	13	7	677
9	(United States) Johnny White	10	16	4	17										630
10	(United States) Bob Harkey		15	8	7	13	4	10	18	DNQ	13	19	9	14	560
11	(United States) Mario Andretti RY		11			9	11	6	3	15	10	22	8	18	530
12	(United States) Johnny Boyd	14		5	20										500
13	(United States) Jud Larson		DNQ	DNQ	DNQ	10	15	11	17	6	4		6	6	490
14	(United States) Bobby Unser	17		32	12	7	18	4	20	4	15	6	18	22	470
15	(United States) Bob Wente		6	9	11		6		25			25		DNQ	420
16	(United States) Arnie Knepper					5	24	7	8	10	6	23	11	16	390
17	(United States) Len Sutton	22		15	2		10	5	DNQ	11	8	15		DNQ	338
18	(United States) Jim McElreath	11	DNQ	21	9	4	**14**	DNQ	12	5	DNQ	12		25	320
19	(United States) Ronnie Duman		20	31					6		7	DNS	17	DNP	302
20	(United States) Dick Rathmann			7	DNQ										300
21	(United States) Johnny Rutherford	21	Wth	27	22	**12**	17	17	5	7	18	Wth	14	23	270
22	(United States) Roger McCluskey	2					DNS					8	7	DNS	238
23	(United States) Bobby Grim	13	8	10	DNQ		20	DNQ	19			DNQ		12	220
24	(United States) Joe Leonard R									14	12	24	15	5	210
25	(United States) Jim Hurtubise	16	2	14	14										160
26	(United States) Troy Ruttman			18	4		8		Wth						160
27	(United States) Mel Kenyon				5		16		22			10		15	160
28	(United States) Tommy Copp								7			11			160
29	(United States) Bob Mathouser		9	22	19	6	DNQ	DNQ	14	DNS		13			123
30	(United States) Chuck Hulse	20	4	DNQ											120
31	(Canada) Billy Foster								16			7		21	120
32	(United States) Ralph Liguori			DNQ			21	9	DNQ	9	DNQ	14		11	120
33	(United States) Bob Veith			19	DNQ									8	100
34	(United States) Art Malone			11											100
35	(United States) Chuck Stevenson	DNQ		28	6										80
36	(United States) Eddie Sachs	6	DNQ	30											80
37	(United States) Mickey Rupp R								9			21			80
38	(United States) Chuck Arnold			DNQ	DNQ		DNQ					9			80
39	(United States) George Snider R													9	80
40	(United States) Gordon Johncock R						DNQ	18	21	DNQ	14	DNQ	DNQ	10	60
41	(United States) Dee Jones R	15		DNQ	DNQ	16	23	14	DNQ	DNS	DNQ	17			35
42	(United States) Bob Hurt R	DNQ			10		DNQ		15	DNQ				DNQ	30
43	(United States) Chuck Rodee		10	DNQ										20	30
44	(United States) Buzz Gregory R						12							DNQ	15
45	(Canada) Ed Kostenuk	19	12	DNQ	DNQ		19								10
46	(United States) Chuck Booth												12		10
-	(United States) Bruce Jacobi		14			14	13	DNQ	DNQ						0
-	(United States) Dempsey Wilson		13	DNQ											0
-	(United States) Walt Hansgen R			13											0
-	(United States) Bill Cheesbourg			16											0
-	(United States) Jack Conely				16										0
-	(United States) Bill Horstmeyer R							16							0
-	(United States) Dan Gurney			17											0
-	(United States) Curly Boyd R					17									0
-	(United Kingdom) Jim Clark			**24**								18			0
-	(United States) Jerry Weld	18													0
-	(Australia) Jack Brabham			20											0
-	(United States) Al Unser R								23					DNS	0
-	(United States) Keith Rachwitz													24	0
-	(United States) Eddie Johnson			26											0
-	(United States) Dave MacDonald R			29											0
-	(United States) Frank Ballard	DNQ	DNS		DNS										0
-	(United States) Bob Christie			DNQ	DNQ				DNQ						0
-	(United States) Hal Rettberg							DNQ			DNQ	DNQ			0
-	(United States) Gig Stephens			DNQ	DNQ										0
-	(United States) Herb Hill				DNQ		DNQ								0
-	(United States) George Morris												DNQ	DNP	0
-	(United States) Ed Hoyle		DNQ												0
-	(United States) Duane Carter			DNQ											0
-	(United States) Elmer George			DNQ											0
-	(United States) Jerry Grant			DNQ											0
-	(United States) Masten Gregory			DNQ											0
-	(United States) Cliff Griffith			DNQ											0
-	(United States) Don Horvath			DNQ											0
-	(United States) Bobby Johns			DNQ											0
-	(United States) Al Miller			DNQ											0
-	(Mexico) Pedro Rodríguez			DNQ											0
-	(United States) Paul Russo			DNQ											0
-	(United States) Steve Stapp						DNQ								0
-	(United States) Billy Cantrell							DNQ							0
-	(United States) Gil Michaels								DNQ						0
-	(United States) Bob Tattersall											DNQ			0
Pos	Driver	PHX1 (United States)	TRE1 (United States)	INDY (United States)	MIL1 (United States)	LHS (United States)	TRE2 (United States)	SPR (United States)	MIL2 (United States)	DQSF (United States)	ISF (United States)	TRE3 (United States)	CSF (United States)	PHX2 (United States)	Pts

Color	Result
Gold	Winner
Silver	2nd place
Bronze	3rd place
Green	4th & 5th place
Light Blue	6th-10th place
Dark Blue	Finished (Outside Top 10)
Purple	Did not finish (Ret)
Red	Did not qualify (DNQ)
Brown	Withdrawn (Wth)
Black	Disqualified (DSQ)
White	Did not start (DNS)
Blank	Did not participate (DNP)
Blank	Not competing

**In-line notation**
**Bold**	Pole position
Italics	Ran fastest race lap
*	Led most race laps
RY Rookie of the Year
R Rookie

== See also ==
- 1964 Indianapolis 500
