= Bobby Marshman =

American racing driver (1936–1964)

- Born: George Robert Marshman; September 24, 1936 Pottstown, Pennsylvania, U.S.
- Died: December 3, 1964 (aged 28) San Antonio, Texas, U.S.

Champ Car career
- 49 races run over 5 years
- Years active: 1960–1964
- Best finish: 5th – 1962
- First race: 1961 Trenton 100 (Trenton)
- Last race: 1964 Bobby Ball Memorial (Phoenix)
- First win: 1962 Bobby Ball Memorial (ASF)
Wins	Podiums	Poles
1	10	1

George Robert Marshman (September 24, 1936 – December 3, 1964), was an American racecar driver.

Born the son of auto race promoters George and Evelyn Marshman in Pottstown, Pennsylvania, Marshman died in San Antonio, Texas of injuries sustained in a tire test in Phoenix, Arizona.

Marshman drove in the USAC Championship Car series, racing in the 1961–1964 seasons, with 49 career starts, including each Indianapolis 500 contest in that span. He finished in the top-ten 25 times, with one victory, in 1962 at the Arizona State Fairgrounds in Phoenix. His seventh-place finish at the 1961 Indianapolis 500 earned him co-Rookie of the Year honors with Parnelli Jones.

Marshman may be best known for his performance during the 1964 Indianapolis 500. Early in the race, following a fiery crash that claimed the lives of Eddie Sachs and Dave MacDonald, Marshman took the lead from polesitter and race favorite Jim Clark. Marshman, driving a Lotus 29-Ford, extended his lead until the 37th lap, when he was forced off the track to avoid hitting a slower car driven by Johnny White. The instant he spent off the track tore loose oil and water lines, and retired the car. Many observers felt Marshman was on his way to a comfortable victory before luck intervened. A story from the time holds that Marshman wandered the crowd for an hour before returning to the pits and his crew. Marshman, dressed in his fireproof overalls and with oily goggle-marks around his eyes, was holding a race program. Jack Beckley, Marshman's crew chief, studied him quizzically and finally asked, "what are you doing with that?" An embarrassed and crestfallen Marshman replied, "I thought if I bought it no one would know I was a driver and they wouldn't ask me silly questions."

On November 27, 1964, Marshman was conducting tire tests at the Phoenix 1-mile paved oval. When his Lotus-Ford crashed into the west retaining wall and ruptured the fuel tank, he was not wearing fire-retardant clothing to protect him according to some reports. First able to leave the wreck unassisted, Marshman succumbed to his second and third degree burns six days later.

About a year after her husband's death, Marshman's widow, Janet F. Marshman, sued Ford Motor Company for $5 million, claiming that the crash resulted from negligence by the car owner, purported to be Ford, which also failed to comply with a warranty that the car was safe according to the suit.

The first Bobby Marshman Memorial race, which featured ARDC midget cars and was promoted by George Marshman, was held at Hatfield Speedway in June 1966.

== Complete USAC Championship Car results ==
Year	1	2	3	4	5	6	7	8	9	10	11	12	13	Pos	Points
1960	TRE	INDY	MIL	LAN	SPR	MIL	DUQ	SYR	ISF	TRE; DNQ	SAC	PHX		-	0
1961	TRE; 17	INDY; 7	MIL; 19	LAN; 11	MIL; 15	SPR; 9	DUQ; 8	SYR; 7	ISF; 2	TRE; 19	SAC; 3	PHX; 11		8th	769
1962	TRE; 10	INDY; 5	MIL; 12	LAN; 5	TRE; 21	SPR; 4	MIL; 3	LAN; 9	SYR; 13	ISF; 6	TRE; 3	SAC; 15	PHX; 1	5th	1,581
1963	TRE; 6	INDY; 16	MIL; 7	LAN; 5	TRE; 19	SPR; 15	MIL; 22	DUQ; 4	ISF; DNQ	TRE; 20	SAC; 18	PHX; 18		15th	323
1964	PHX; 7	TRE; 3	INDY; 25	MIL; 21	LAN; 3	TRE; 22	SPR; 2	MIL; 24	DUQ; 2	ISF; 16	TRE; 16	SAC; 2	PHX; 13	7th	867

== Indianapolis 500 results ==
Year	Chassis	Engine	Start	Finish
1961	Epperly	Offy	33rd	7th
1962	Epperly	Offy	3rd	5th
1963	Epperly	Offy	7th	16th
1964	Lotus	Ford	2nd	25th

Sporting positions
Preceded by Jim Hurtubise	Indianapolis 500; Rookie of the Year; 1961; With Parnelli Jones	Succeeded by Jim McElreath
