= Bob Wente =

American racing driver

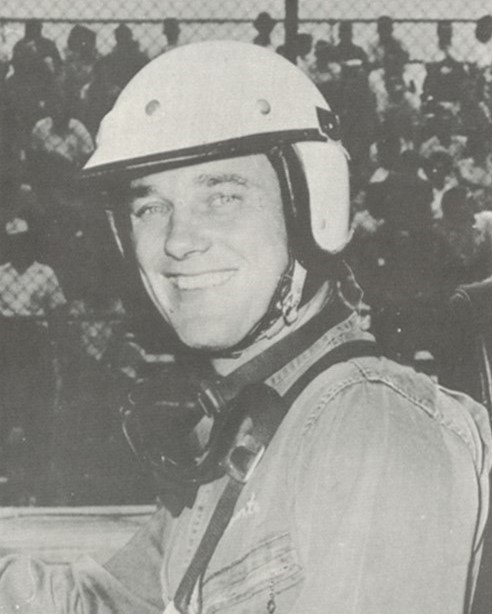
Wente, circa 1963

Bob Wente (May 28, 1933 – August 13, 2000) was an American racing driver.

== Midget car ==
Wente started racing midget cars in 1953 at the St. Louis Auto Racing Association. He won the Midwest region of the USAC National Midget championship in 1960, and finished second by 9.75 points to Jimmy Davies. Wente won the USAC Indoor Midget championship in 1961. He won his first USAC National Midget championship in 1963 after finishing second for three straight years. Wente is second on the list of all-time USAC National Midget car winners behind Mel Kenyon.

Notable races that Wente won include the Hut Hundred in 1963, and the Night Before the 500 in 1969 and 1976.

== Championship Car ==
Wente used his midget car experiences to earn a ride in the USAC Championship Car series. He raced in the 1963-1965 and 1967 seasons, with 11 career starts, including the 1964 Indianapolis 500. He finished in the top ten 5 times, with his best finish in 3rd position in 1965 at Trenton.

Despite witnessing the tragic events in front of him on the opening lap of the 1964 Indianapolis 500 that claimed the lives of Eddie Sachs and Dave MacDonald, Wente charged from his 32nd starting spot to take ninth place at the checkers in his number 68, Trevis/Offenhauser. Wente attempted to qualify the next two seasons in 1965 and 1966, but failed to make the field.

Wente also won a single USAC Sprint car race.

Wente remained in the racing business long after his driving career ended. He stayed busy by owning and operating a restaurant named Wente's O & W (Open Wheel) in Chesterfield, Missouri up until his death.

== Award ==
- He was inducted in the National Midget Auto Racing Hall of Fame in its first class in 1984.
