= Ronnie Duman =

American racing driver (1929–1968)

- Nationality: (United States) American
- Born: February 12, 1929; Dearborn, Michigan, U.S.
- Died: June 9, 1968 (aged 39); West Allis, Wisconsin, U.S.

Champ Car career
- 62 races run over 8 years
- Years active: 1961-1968
- Best finish: 13th - 1962 USAC season
- First race: 1961 Rex Mays Classic
- Last race: 1968 Rex Mays Classic
Wins	Podiums	Poles
0	1	0

Ronald Barth Duman (February 12, 1929 – June 9, 1968), was an American racing driver who competed in the USAC Championship Car series and the Indianapolis 500. Duman was an accomplished driver in sprints and midgets, and won the prestigious Little 500 at Anderson Speedway in 1959 and 1960.

Born in Dearborn, Michigan, Duman later moved to Speedway, Indiana and lived practically across the street from the Indianapolis Motor Speedway. He drove in the USAC Championship Car series from 1961 to 1968. He had 63 career starts, including the Indianapolis 500 from 1964 to 1968. Duman had 27 top-ten finishes in Champ Car competition, with a best finish of third in 1965 at Phoenix.

Duman was fatally injured in a crash at the 1968 Rex Mays Classic at the Milwaukee Mile.

== Indianapolis 500 career ==
After passing his rookie test in 1961, Duman made an attempt to qualify with the Ray Brady Special but the run was incomplete. In 1962, he qualified the Stearly Motor Freight Special, but was bumped and wound up as the second alternate. In 1963, he was entered in the Federal Engineering Special, but crashed during practice.

Duman finally qualified for the Indianapolis 500 in 1964. He qualified a sponsor-less pink and black Trevis-built Watson/Offy entered by Nick Fulbright and Dave Paul. It was the same car driven by Allen Crowe in the 1963 race. Duman qualified 16th on pole day, but ended up the 32nd-overall fastest qualifier. He narrowly held on to make the lineup on Bump day, as the second-slowest car in the field. A few days before the race, the team received sponsorship from the Clean Wear Service Company – a local laundry service that was frequented by the drivers and crews during the month of May.

Duman was involved in the fiery crash that took the lives of Dave MacDonald and Eddie Sachs. The accident happened in front of Duman, and as he approached the crash scene, he attempted to miss both Sachs and MacDonald. However, in the fiery melee, the Novi of Bobby Unser knocked Duman's car from behind, and sent the car spinning to the inside wall. The car became engulfed in flames, but not before Duman was able to climb out and escape to the grass infield. Duman was hospitalized with second and third degree burns, and missed over two months of racing while he recuperated.

After recovering from his injuries, Duman qualified for the 1965 race in the Travelon Trailer Special. He ran as high as 12th before dropping out. In 1966 race, he started last (33rd) and became involved in the opening lap crash, finishing last. In 1967 race, he finished 23rd driving the REV 500 Special for J. C. Agajanian.

Duman's final Indy 500 start came in 1968 race. On the final turn of the final lap, Duman's engine blew coming out of turn four, and he coasted across the finish line to finish 6th. The 1968 race would be his best result at Indianapolis, as just over a one-week later, Duman was killed in a crash at Milwaukee.

Duman's son Rick is a championship-winning mechanic who won the 2005 Clint Brawner Award at the Indianapolis 500, currently owning Turn 4 Restorations that restores vintage Indy cars.

=== Indianapolis 500 results ===
Year	Chassis	Engine	Start	Finish
1961	Kurtis Kraft	Offy	Failed to Qualify	
1962	Elder	Offy	Bumped	
1963	Trevis	Offy	Practice crash	
1964	Trevis	Offy	16th	31st
1965	Gerhardt	Offy	25th	22nd
1966	Eisert	Ford	33rd	33rd
1967	Shrike	Offy	17th	23rd
1968	Hayhoe	Offy	26th	6th

== Awards and accomplishments ==
Duman was the only USAC Champ Car driver to race a front-engine upright 'dirt-style' car on a road course (1965) and a rear-engine car in a USAC championship dirt car race (1966).

- Inducted in 1985 to the Michigan Motor Sports Hall of Fame
- Inducted in 1994 to the Little 500 Hall of Fame

== Death ==
Less than two weeks after he finished sixth at the 1968 Indianapolis 500, Duman was at the next race of the USAC Championship season, the Rex Mays Classic at Milwaukee. Duman started 14th in the 24-car field, driving the Central Excavating Gerhardt Turbocharged Offy. On the third lap, the cars of Bay Darnell and Norm Brown reportedly got tangled in turn one. Both cars slid towards the outside wall, collecting Duman in the process. Duman's car tipped over and began barrel-rolling before it flew into the catchfence cockpit first. After Duman's car bounced back down the track, both Darnell and Brown's car slammed the outside wall and the three cars came to rest on fire. Darnell and Brown suffered minor burn injuries, but Duman was killed instantly from massive head injuries when the cockpit of his car struck the catchfence. His helmet had been shattered and pulled from his head. Eight spectators were also injured by the flying debris which cleared the catchfence.

Duman is interred at Crown Hill Cemetery in Indianapolis.
