= Brabham BT12 =

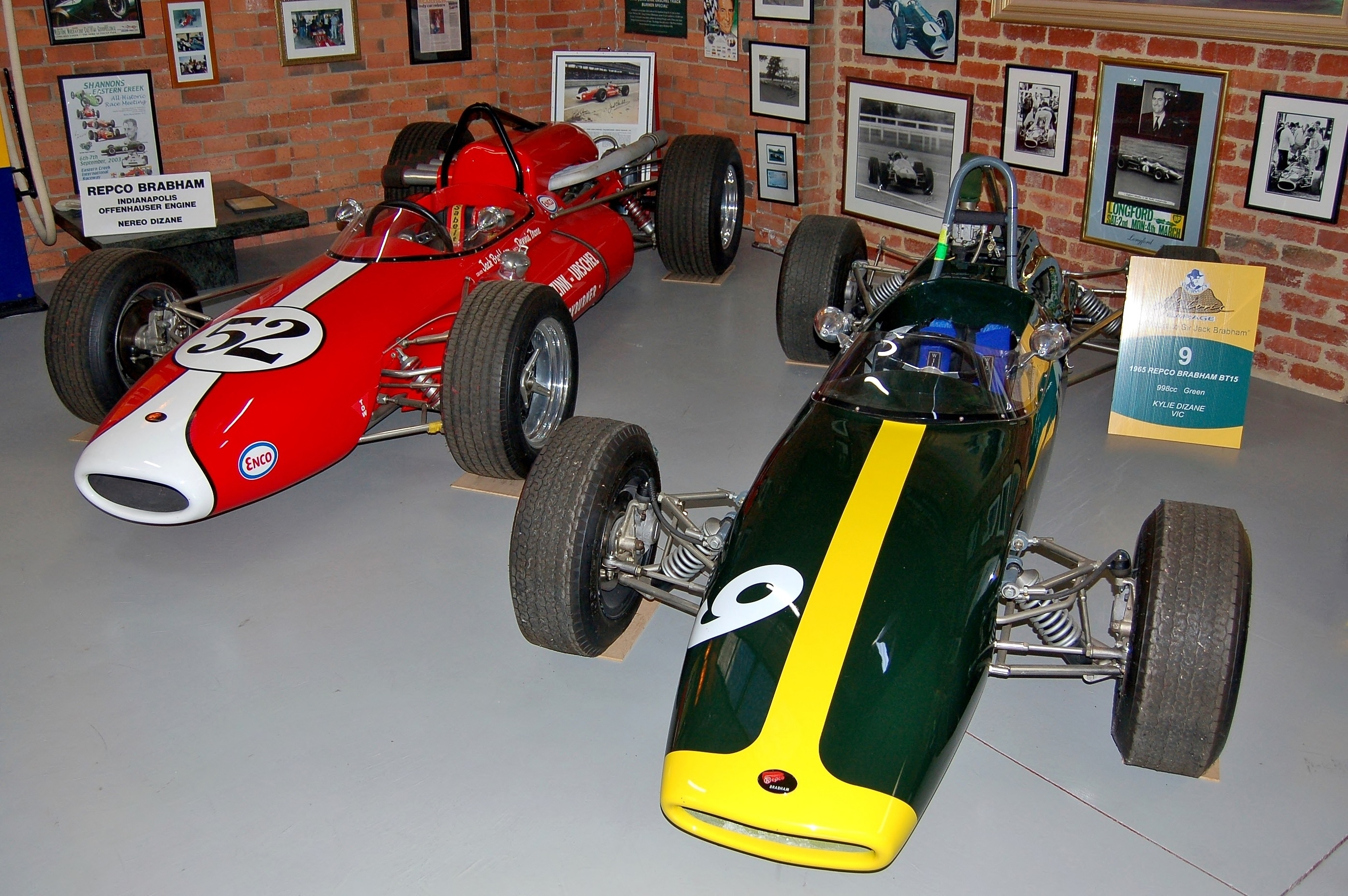
Brabham BT12 (red-and-white car on the left), next to a Brabham BT15 Formula 3 car (green-and-yellow car on the right)

The Brabham BT12 was a mid-engined open-wheel racing car, designed, developed and built by the Brabham team, to compete in the 1964 Indianapolis 500. Jack Brabham managed to qualify the car on the grid in 25th-place, but retired on lap 77 of the race due to a fuel tank damage, from a collision on the first lap. The car was powered by an naturally aspirated Offenhauser 252 cu in (4.13 L) DOHC inline four-cylinder engine, making about 420 hp (310 kW).
