= Bill Horstmeyer =

American racing driver (1930–1964)

- Born: William Alan Horstmeyer; July 4, 1930 Madison, Wisconsin, U.S.
- Died: August 22, 1964 (aged 34) Springfield, Illinois, U.S.

Champ Car career
- 1 race run over 1 year
- First race: 1964 Tony Bettenhausen; Memorial (Springfield)
Wins	Podiums	Poles
0	0	0

William Alan Horstmeyer (July 4, 1930 – August 22, 1964) was an American racing driver.

The 34 year old Horstmeyer was an experienced midget car and sprint car racer when he made his Championship Car debut at the Illinois State Fairgrounds Racetrack for the Tony Bettenhausen Memorial in August 1964. On lap 24 his car brushed the outside wall entering the front stretch and lost a wheel, which caused that corner to dig into the dirt, flipping the car several times. The car landed upside down and on fire with Horstmeyer trapped inside. Horstmeyer died of burn injuries later that day.
