= Parnelli Jones =

American racing driver (1933–2024)

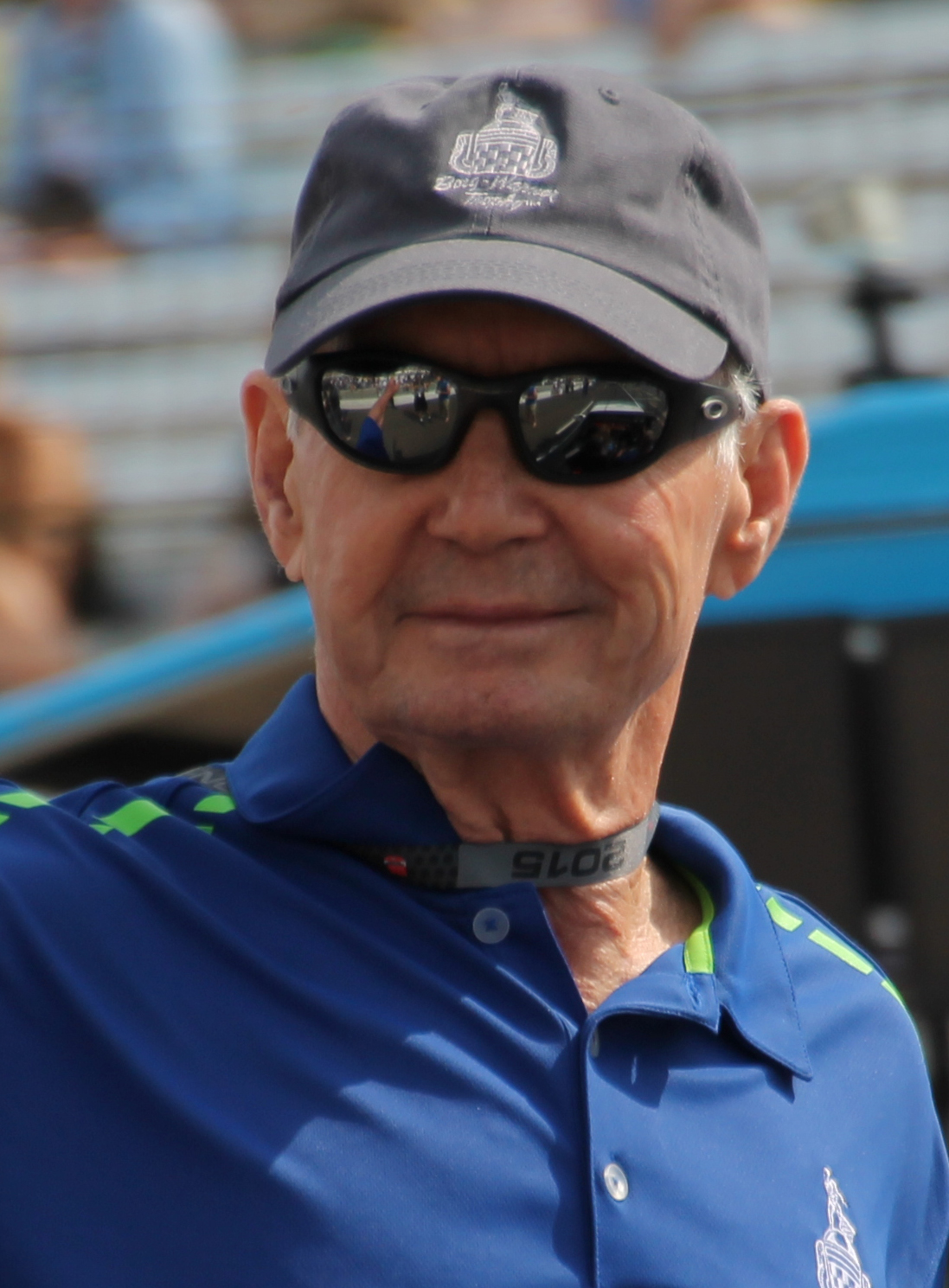
- Jones in 2015
- Born: Rufus Parnell Jones; August 12, 1933 Texarkana, Arkansas, U.S.
- Died: June 4, 2024 (aged 90) Torrance, California, U.S.
- Relatives: P. J. Jones (son); Jagger Jones (grandson)

Championship titles
- USAC Midwest Sprint Car (1960); USAC Sprint Car (1961, 1962); USAC Stock Car (1964); Major victories Indianapolis 500 (1963); Baja 1000 (1971, 1972)

Champ Car career
- 59 races run over 8 years
- Best finish: 3rd (1962)
- First race: 1960 Rex Mays Classic (Milwaukee)
- Last race: 1967 Indianapolis 500 (Indianapolis)
- First win: 1961 Bobby Ball Memorial (Phoenix)
- Last win: 1965 Rex Mays Classic (Milwaukee)
Wins	Podiums	Poles
6	17	12

NASCAR Cup Series career
- 34 races run over 12 years
- Best finish: 33rd (1958)
- First race: 1956 Race 24 (Merced)
- Last race: 1970 Motor Trend 500 (Riverside)
- First win: 1957 Race 36 (Bremerton)
- Last win: 1967 Motor Trend 500 (Riverside)
Wins	Top tens	Poles
4	11	3

Rufus Parnell "Parnelli" Jones (August 12, 1933 – June 4, 2024) was an American professional racing driver and racing team owner. He is notable for his accomplishments while competing in the Indianapolis 500 and the Baja 1000 desert race, and the Trans-Am Championship series. In 1962, he became the first driver to qualify for the Indianapolis 500 at over 150 mph (240 km/h). He won the race in 1963, then famously broke down while leading the 1967 race with three laps to go in a turbine car. During his career as an owner, he won the Indy 500 in 1970–1971 with driver Al Unser.

Jones won races in many types of vehicles: sports cars, Indy cars, sprint cars, midget cars, off-road vehicles, and stock cars.

== Driving career ==
Born in Texarkana, Arkansas, Jones' family moved to Torrance, California, where he grew up (and lived in nearby Rolling Hills). He was nicknamed Parnelli by his boyhood friend Billy Calder, who hoped that the Jones family would not discover their son was racing cars as a 17-year-old minor. Jones participated in his first race in a jalopy race at Carrell Speedway in Gardena, California. He developed his racing skills by racing in many different classes in the 1950s, including 15 stock car racing wins in the NASCAR Pacific Coast Late Model Series.

Jones' first major championship was the Midwest region Sprint car title in 1960. The title caught the attention of promoter J. C. Agajanian, who became his sponsor. He began racing at Indianapolis in 1961.

Jones was named the 1961 Indianapolis 500 Rookie of the Year, an honor that he shared with Bobby Marshman. Jones led early in the race and ran among the leaders until being hit in the face with a stone, bloodying his face, blurring his vision and slowing him to a 12th-place finish.

In 1962, Jones was the first driver to qualify over 150 mph at the Indianapolis 500, winning the pole position at a speed of 150.370 mph (241.997 km/h). Jones dominated the first two-thirds of the race until a brake line failure slowed him, and he settled for a seventh-place finish.

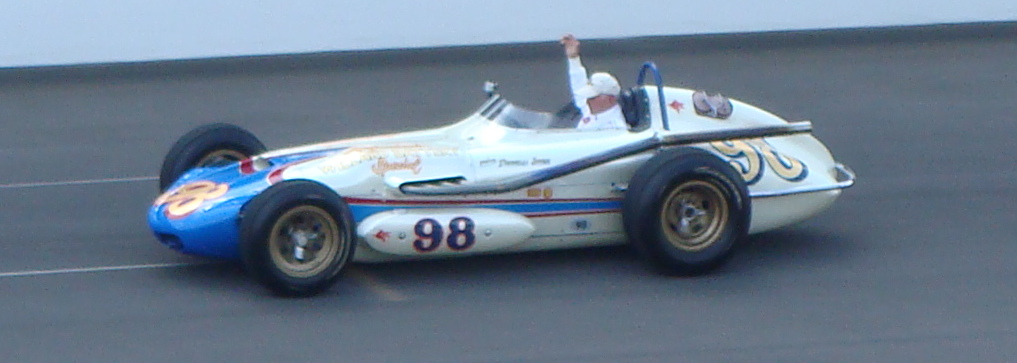
Jones drives the car he drove in the Indianapolis 500 from 1961 through 1964 around the Indianapolis Motor Speedway track in 2012.

In the 1963 Indianapolis 500, Jones started on the pole. This was the year the controversial Lotus-Ford rear-engined cars made their first appearance, and had ruffled the Indianapolis establishment. Before the race, the chief steward, Harlan Fengler, told the teams that he would black-flag any cars that leaked oil on the track, warning, "Don't believe me, just try me."

With Scotsman Jim Clark in a Lotus-Ford closing on Jones in the waning laps, Jones' car developed a horizontal crack in the external oil reservoir. At that moment, driver Eddie Sachs crashed on the oil-slickened racing surface and brought out a yellow caution flag, slowing the field. Agajanian, Jones' car owner, argued with chief steward Harlan Fengler not to issue a black flag, insisting the oil level had dropped below the level of the crack, and that the leak had stopped. As Agajanian pleaded with Fengler, Lotus head man Colin Chapman rushed up to join the conversation and demanded that Fengler follow the rules about disqualifying cars with oil leaks. With the end of the race just minutes away, Fengler took no action, and Jones went on to win. The Lotus-Ford team, while unhappy with the obvious favoritism displayed by race officials toward Jones and Agajanian, also acknowledged Jones' clear superiority in the event. In addition, Ford officials recognized that a victory through disqualification of Clark's biggest competitor would not be well received by the public, so they declined to protest.

Also that year, legendary vehicle fabricator Bill Stroppe built a Mercury Marauder USAC Stock car for Jones. Jones won the 1963 Pikes Peak International Hill Climb in the car, and broke the stock car speed record.

In 1964, Jones won seven races (and tied for a win) on his way to the USAC Stock car crown. He won the Turkey Night Grand Prix midget car event. Mercury decided to pull out of stock car racing after the season. The following year, Jones almost won Indy for a second time, finishing second behind Jim Clark.

Jones won five of the nine midget car events that he entered in 1966, including the Turkey Night Grand Prix. He finished fourteenth in the final points despite competing in only nine of 65 events.

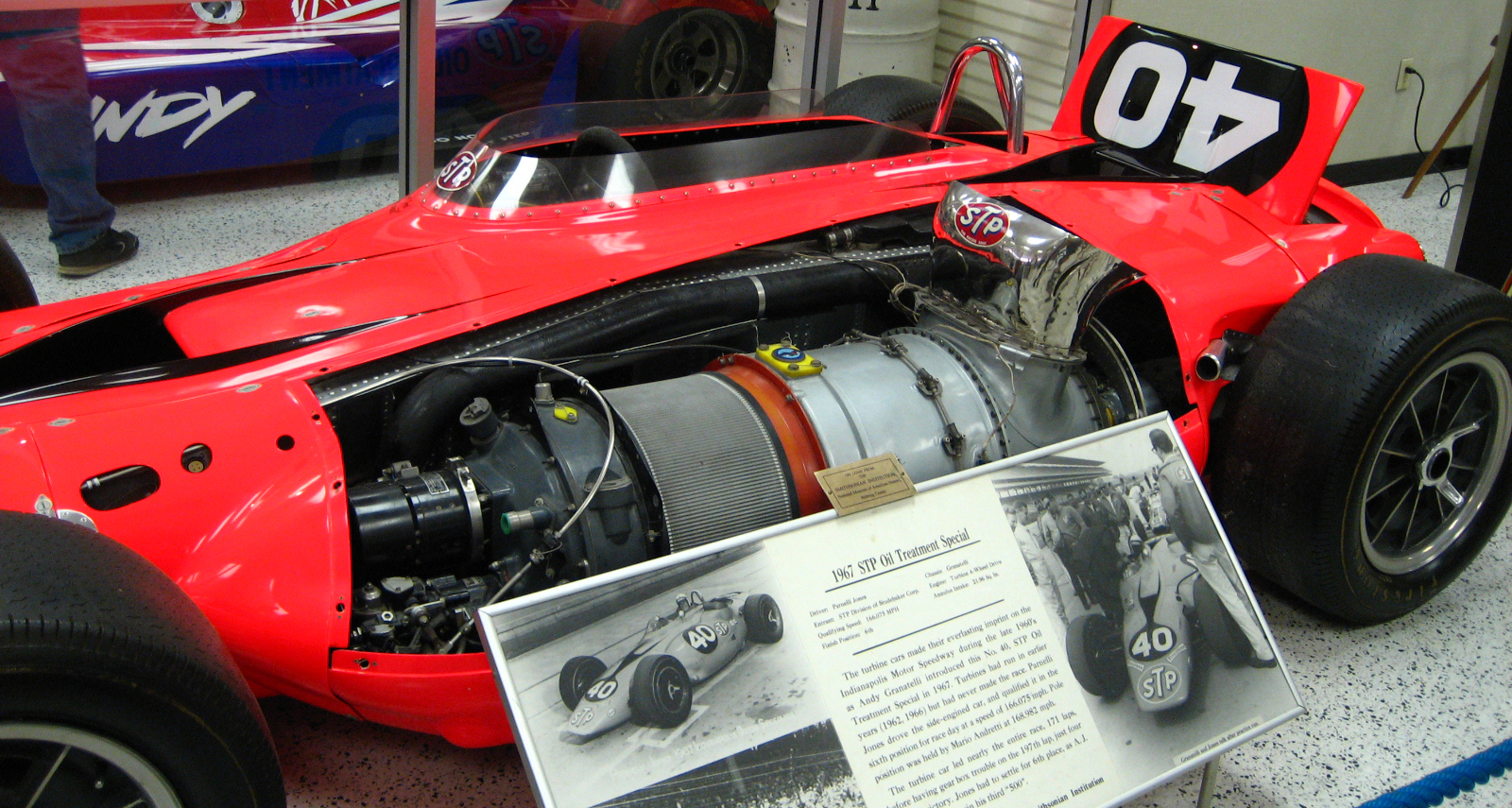
Jones's STP-Paxton Turbocar from the 1967 Indianapolis 500.

In 1967, Jones drove in the Indianapolis 500 for owner Andy Granatelli in the revolutionary STP-Paxton Turbocar. Jones dominated the race but dropped out with three laps to go when a small, inexpensive transmission bearing broke. After 1968, turbine-powered cars were legislated out of competition.

Also in 1967, as part of his stock car contract with the Lincoln-Mercury division of the Ford Motor Company, Jones drove a Mercury Cougar for Bud Moore in the second-year Trans Am series. In April, Jones dueled with teammate, friend and rival Dan Gurney in a brutal 300-mile (480 km), 4-hour event at Green Valley, Texas in 113-degree heat, losing by inches to Gurney.

Stroppe suggested that Jones try his hand at off-road racing in front of a large crowd at a Christmas party in 1967. Jones at first said no, since he had enough of dirt. Stroppe suggested that maybe off-road racing was too hard for Jones, and the challenge started Jones' off-road career. Jones and Stroppe teamed up for the 711-mile (1,144 km) Star Dust 7/11 race across the Nevada desert in early 1968. Jones had never driven or pre-run the Ford Bronco. Jones hit a dry wash at full speed, which broke the wheels and blew out the front tires. Jones would later have a guest appearance in the original film Gone in 60 Seconds featuring him and his Bronco which was stolen in the plot. Jones had become hooked on off-road racing.

In 1968, Jones headed a super-roster of seven drivers signed by Andy Granatelli to drive STP Lotus 56 turbine cars in an unprecedented single-team assault on the Indianapolis 500. The deaths of Jim Clark and Mike Spence, plus a serious injury to Jackie Stewart, whittled the entry to four. Jones, testing his reworked 1967 car in practice, was dissatisfied with the car's performance compared to the newer "wedge"-shaped Lotus 56 turbines, and had concluded the car was unsafe. He stepped out of the car, which was subsequently assigned to Joe Leonard, who promptly wrecked the car in practice. Jones retired from driving IndyCars, but later admitted, "If I hadn't already won Indy, they could never have kept me out of that car."

Jones entered the 1968 NORRA Mexican 1000 (now Baja 1000). Jones led until the 150-mile (240 km) marker. The Off-road Motorsports Hall of Fame describes Jones' racing style: "Jones and Stroppe had to find a way to keep their vehicles in one piece. During races Jones would push the vehicles at maximum speeds until they gave way, with Stroppe telling him at top volume the entire time to take it easier on the vehicle."

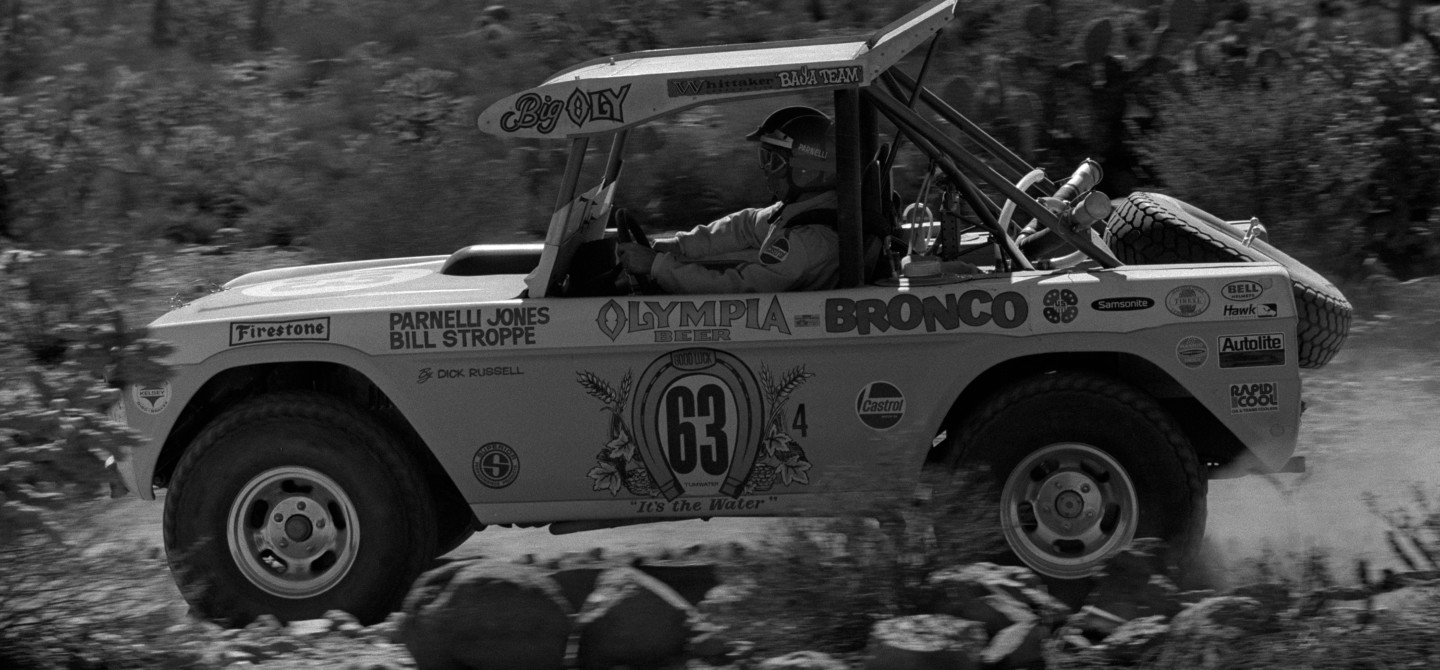
Parnelli Jones driving Big Oly in Baja 500

Jones had a special car fabricated by Dick Russell via Bill Stroppe that looked like a Bronco, but had racing parts that could withstand rigorous jarring that off-road vehicles endure. Jones named the vehicle "Big Oly" after his sponsor Olympia Beer. Jones used the vehicle to lead the 1971 Mexican 1000 from start to finish in a new record time of 14 hours and 59 minutes. It was the first off-road racing victory by an Indy 500-winning driver. In Big Oly, Jones won back-to-back Mexican NORRA 1000s, a Mint 400, a Baja 500, along with other victories.

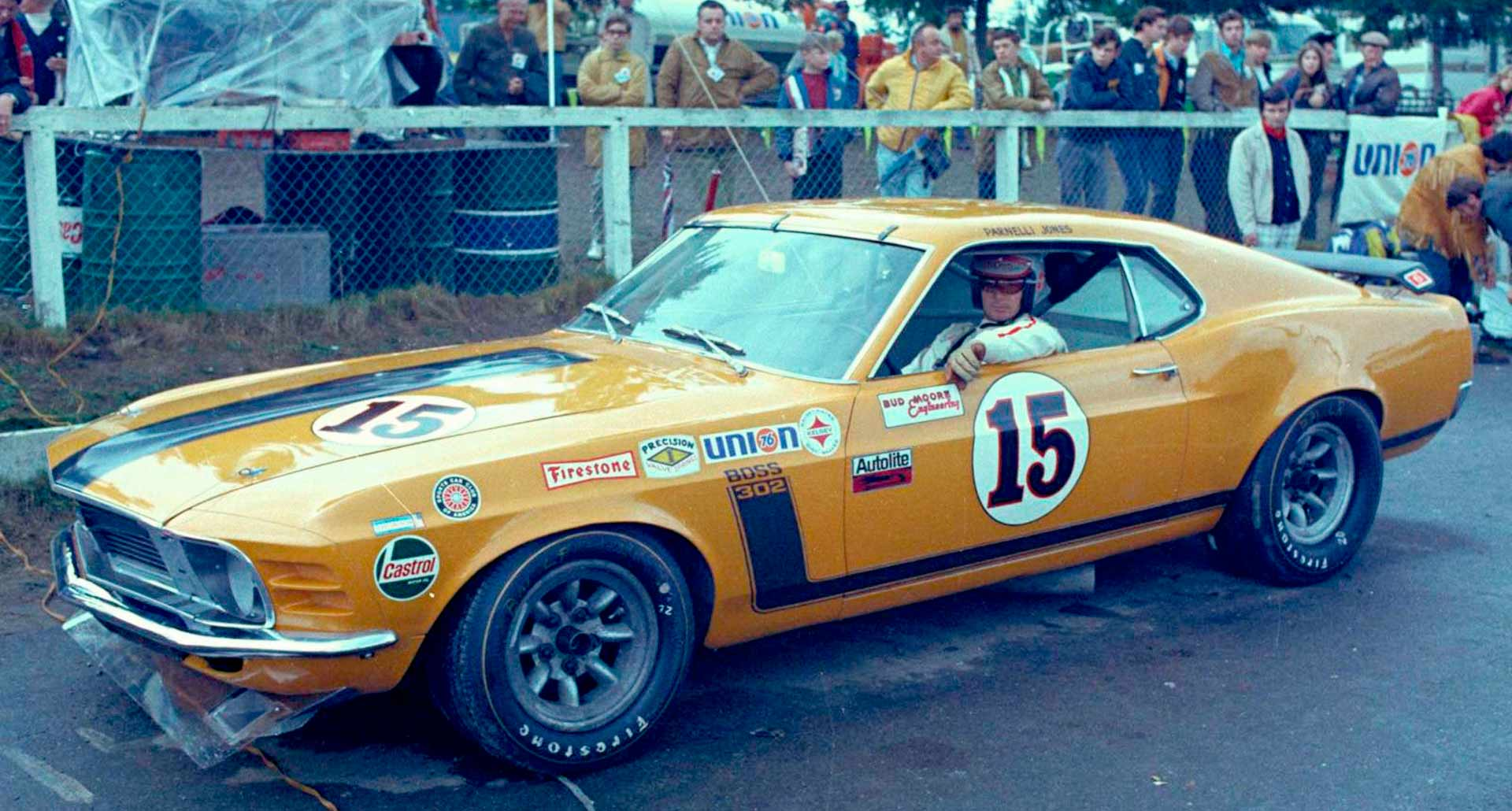
Jones's 1970 Boss 302 Mustang

Capitalizing on his long history with Ford, Jones joined with Bud Moore Engineering to race in the SCCA Trans-Am Championship series. In 1967, to help with the vehicle launch, Jones raced a prepped 1967 Mercury Cougar. The car was not overly competitive, however Ford did win the Manufacturers Title. Jones did not race in 1968 season. Jones returned to Bud Moore and Trans-Am in 1969 to help with the debut of the Boss 302 Mustang. Teamed with George Follmer, Jones finished second in the Drivers Championship to Mark Donohue driving a 1969 Penkse prepared Camaro. Both Moore and Jones agreed that the Firestone tires were the reason they did not win the championship due to their short life compared to Goodyear, but due to Jones's Firestone sponsorship, they were required. In 1970, Moore, Jones, and Follmer returned to dominate the 1970 Trans-Am season.

Jones finished his racing career with major wins during the year 1973. He won his second Mexican 1000 in 16 hours and 42 minutes. He also won the 1973 Baja 500 and Mint 400 off-road events. Jones had a major accident at SCORE International's 1974 Baja 500, and stepped away from full-time off-road racing to become a race car owner.

=== Driving career summary ===
Jones retired with six IndyCar wins and twelve pole positions, four wins in 34 NASCAR starts, including the 1967 Motor Trend 500 at Riverside, 25 midget car feature wins in occasional races between 1960 and 1967, 25 career sprint car wins, and seven Tran-Am wins and a Drivers Championship in 1970. His fifteen wins is eighth on the all-time in NASCAR Pacific Coast Late Model history.

In 1993, Jones took part in the Fast Masters. He advanced to the final championship round and placed 6th overall.

== Car owner ==
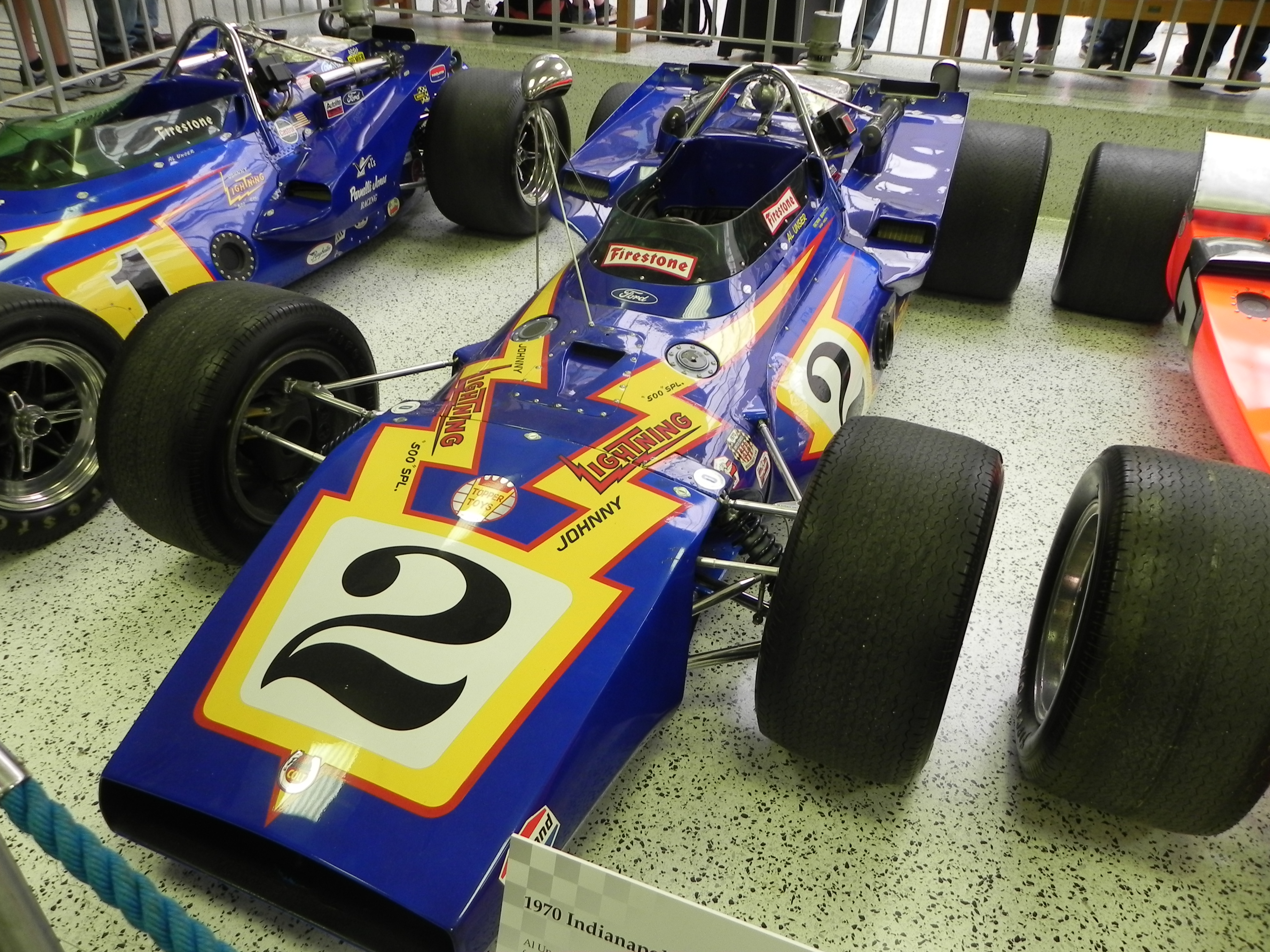
1970 Indianapolis 500 winning car (#2). The 1971 winning car (#1) is visible to the left.

Jones started Vel’s Parnelli Jones Racing, which won the Indianapolis 500 again as an owner in 1970 and 1971 with driver Al Unser driving the Johnny Lightning special. The team also won the 1970, 1971, and 1972 USAC National Championships.

Jones owned the Parnelli Formula One race team from late 1974 to early 1976, although it achieved little success.

Jones returned to off-road racing as owner of Walker Evans' 1976 SCORE truck, and Evans won the championship. They teamed up for the 1977 CORE Class 2 championship.

Jones owned vehicles that took class wins at the Baja 500 and Baja 1000. His USAC Dirt Car won two championships and the Triple Crown three times.

== Documentary ==
Jones starred in the one-hour documentary Behind the Indianapolis 500 with Parnelli Jones. Narrated by Bob Varsha, the film takes viewers behind the scenes of the Indianapolis 500, through the eyes and experiences of Parnelli Jones. In addition to Parnelli, Rick Mears, Mario Andretti, Bobby Unser, Al Unser Jr., P. J. Jones, Chip Ganassi, and others are interviewed throughout. The film was selected for the 2016 Sun Valley Film Festival, which Parnelli and Bob Varsha attended.

== Businessman ==
Jones owned and operated several successful businesses. He owned Parnelli Jones Inc., which operated 47 retail Parnelli Jones Tire Centers in four states. Parnelli Jones Enterprises was a chain of Firestone Racing Tires in 14 Western United States. Parnelli Jones Wholesale was a reseller which sold and distributed shock absorbers, passenger car tires, and other automotive products to retail tire dealers. In addition, Parnelli Jones has several wheel manufacturers companies since the beginning of the 70s, z.b. Rebel Wheel co, US Mags and American Racing Equipment.

== Death ==
Jones died in Torrance, California, on June 4, 2024, at the age of 90.

== Awards and honors ==
- He was inducted into the Off-Road Motorsports Hall of Fame in 1978.
- He was inducted into the Indianapolis Motor Speedway Hall of Fame in 1985.
- He was inducted into the International Motorsports Hall of Fame in 1990.
- He was inducted into the National Midget Auto Racing Hall of Fame in 1990.
- He was inducted into the National Sprint Car Hall of Fame in 1991.
- He was inducted into the Motorsports Hall of Fame of America in 1992.
- He was inducted into the West Coast Stock Car Hall of Fame in 2002.
- He was inducted into the USAC Hall of Fame in 2012.
- He was inducted into the Trans-Am Series Hall of Fame in 2025.

== Complete USAC Championship Car results ==
Year	1	2	3	4	5	6	7	8	9	10	11	12	13	14	15	16	17	18	19	20	21	Pos	Points
1960	TRE	INDY	MIL; 16	LAN; 6	SPR; DNQ	MIL; 13	DUQ; 18	SYR; 6	ISF; 17	TRE; 19	SAC; 2	PHX; DNQ										18th	333
1961	TRE; 15	INDY; 12	MIL	LAN; 2	MIL; 23	SPR; 11	DUQ; 12	SYR; 5	ISF; 12	TRE; 9	SAC; 2	PHX; 1										9th	750
1962	TRE; 2	INDY; 7	MIL; 2	LAN; 2	TRE; 4	SPR; 2	MIL; 9	LAN; 3	SYR; 15	ISF; 1	TRE; 19	SAC; 5	PHX; 4									3rd	1,760
1963	TRE; 2	INDY; 1	MIL; DNQ	LAN; 4	TRE; 22	SPR; 8	MIL; 23	DUQ; 6	ISF; 18	TRE; 22	SAC; 12	PHX; 4										4th	1,540
1964	PHX; 3	TRE; 19	INDY; 23	MIL	LAN	TRE; DNQ	SPR; 13	MIL; 1	DUQ; 16	ISF; 17	TRE; 1	SAC; 16	PHX; 17									6th	940
1965	PHX	TRE; DNQ	INDY; 2	MIL; 1	LAN	PIP	TRE	IRP	ATL	LAN	MIL; 17	SPR	MIL; DNQ	DUQ	ISF	TRE	SAC	PHX				10th	1,000
1966	PHX	TRE	INDY; 14	MIL; DNS	LAN	ATL	PIP	IRP	LAN	SPR	MIL	DUQ	ISF	TRE	SAC	PHX; 10						41st	60
1967	PHX	TRE	INDY; 6	MIL	LAN	PIP	MOS	MOS	IRP	LAN	MTR	MTR	SPR	MIL	DUQ	ISF	TRE	SAC	HAN	PHX	RIV	20th	400
1972	PHX	TRE	INDY; DNP	MIL	MCH	POC	MIL	ONT	TRE	PHX												-	0

== Indianapolis 500 results ==
Year	Car	Start	Qual	Rank	Finish	Laps	Led	Retired
1961	98	5	146.080	7	12	192	27	Flagged
1962	98	1	150.370	1	7	200	120	Running
1963	98	1	151.153	1	1	200	167	Running
1964	98	4	155.099	4	23	55	7	Pit fire
1965	98	5	158.625	5	2	200	0	Running
1966	98	4	162.484	4	14	87	0	Wheel Bearing
1967	40	6	166.075	6	6	196	171	Bearing
Totals						1130	492	

Starts	7
Poles	2
Front Row	2
Wins	1
Top 5	2
Top 10	4
Retired	3

Sporting positions
Preceded by Jim Hurtubise	Indianapolis 500; Rookie of the Year; 1961; With Bobby Marshman	Succeeded by Jim McElreath
Preceded by Rodger Ward	Indianapolis 500 Winner; 1963	Succeeded by A. J. Foyt

Sporting positions
Preceded by Don White	USAC Stock Car Champion; 1964	Succeeded by Norm Nelson
