= Brabham BT15 =

Formula 3 racing car

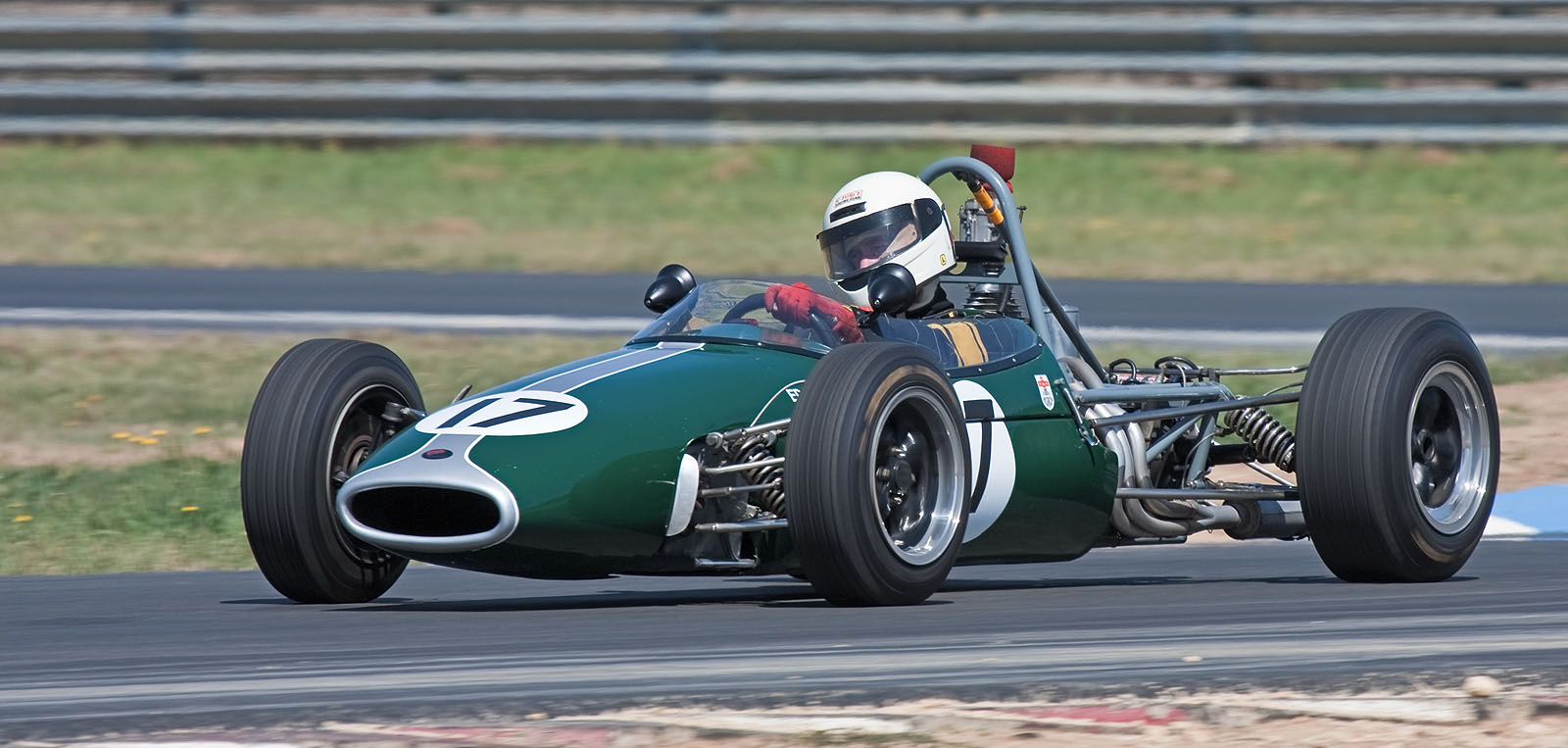
Brabham BT15

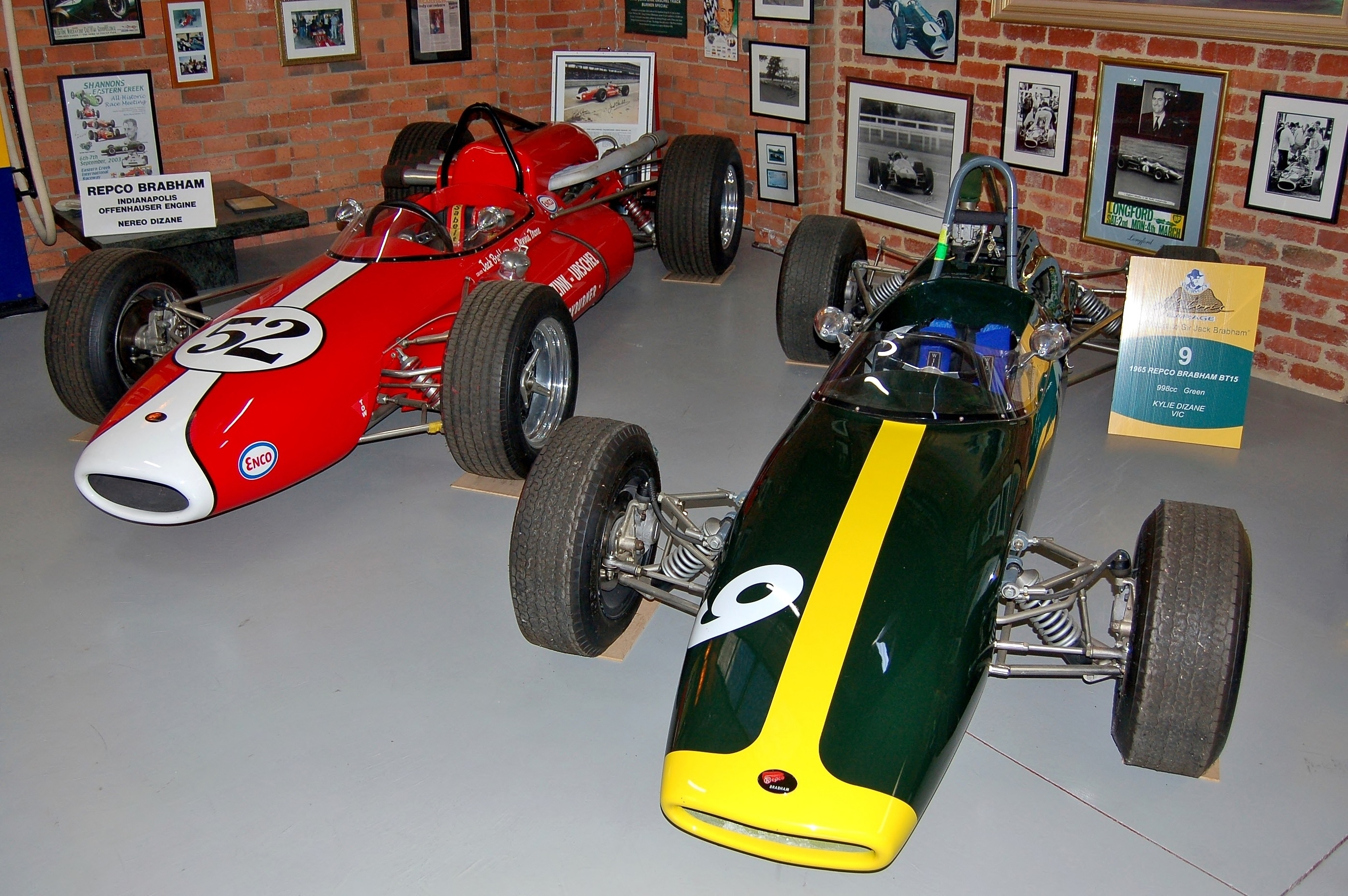
Brabham BT15 Formula 3 car (green-and-yellow car on the right; closest to the camera) next to a Brabham BT12 IndyCar (red-and-white car on the left)

The Brabham BT15 is a mid-engined open-wheel Formula 3 racing car, designed, developed, and built by Brabham between 1965 and 1966. 26 cars were built (though the records say 32 extra cars were built; this may be an error). It was powered by a naturally aspirated, 997 cc (60.8 cu in), Ford straight-four engine (the same type of engine used in the Ford Anglia).
