= Hayhoe =

Hayhoe is a surname. Notable people with the surname include:

- Barney Hayhoe, Baron Hayhoe (1925-2013), British politician
- Bill Hayhoe (born 1946), American football player
- Brock Hayhoe (born 1986), Canadian ballet dancer and drag queen
- Katharine Hayhoe (born 1972), American atmospheric scientist
- Simon Hayhoe (born 1969), British educationist
- Tom Hayhoe (born 1956), English official
- George Hayhoe, engineer at Mercer University
- Alfred Hayhoe, British racehorse trainer
