= Johnny White (racing driver, born 1932) =

American racecar driver

- Born: January 18, 1932 Warren, Michigan, United States
- Died: December 24, 1977 (aged 45) Indianapolis, Indiana, United States

John Bedford White (January 18, 1932 – December 24, 1977) was an American race car driver.

Born in Warren, Michigan, White died in Indianapolis, Indiana. He drove in the USAC Championship Car series, racing in the 1963 and 1964 seasons, with 11 career starts, including the 1964 Indianapolis 500. He finished in the top ten 7 times, with his best finish in 4th position at the 1964 Indianapolis 500, which earned him Rookie of the Year.

The career of Johnny White came to an end on June 14, 1964, when he was paralyzed from the neck down after flipping his sprint car and rolling along the top of the guard rail at the Terre Haute Action Track. Over the years the injuries that Johnny received eventually took a toll on his overall health, resulting in his death on Christmas Eve, 1977.

== Award ==
White was inducted into the Michigan Motor Sports Hall of Fame in 1985, and was inducted into the National Sprint Car Hall of Fame in 1999.

Sporting positions
| Preceded by Jim Clark | Indianapolis 500; Rookie of the Year; 1964 | Succeeded by Mario Andretti |
