= 1964 Indianapolis 500 =

American motor race

48th Indianapolis 500
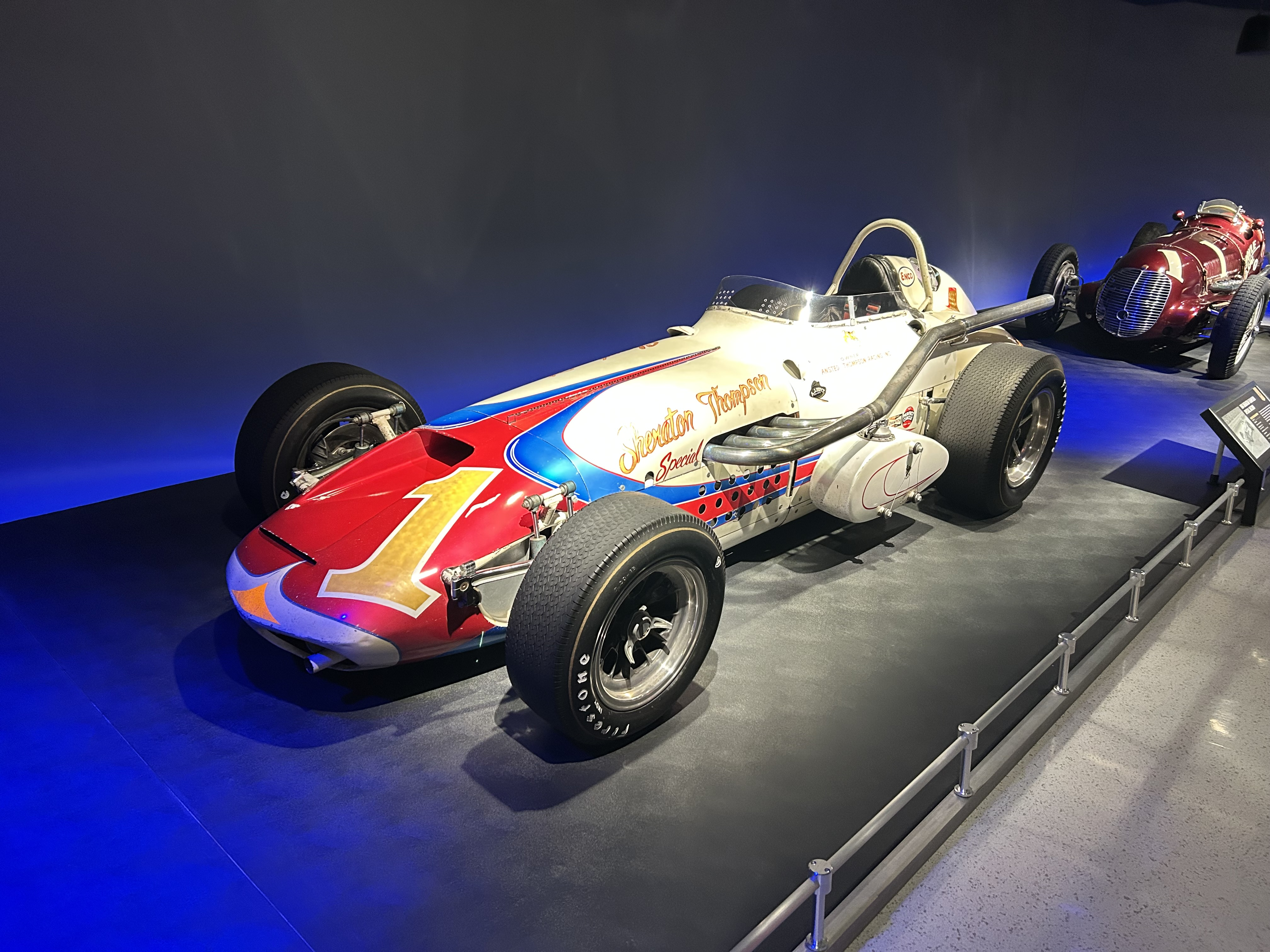

Indianapolis Motor Speedway

Indianapolis 500
- Sanctioning body: USAC
- Season: 1964 USAC season
- Date: May 30, 1964
- Winner: A. J. Foyt
- Winning team: Ansted-Thompson Racing
- Winning Chief Mechanic: George Bignotti
- Time of race: 3:23:35.83
- Average speed: 147.350 mph (237.137 km/h)
- Pole position: Jim Clark
- Pole speed: 158.828 mph (255.609 km/h)
- Fastest qualifier: Jim Clark
- Rookie of the Year: Johnny White
- Most laps led: A. J. Foyt (146)

Pre-race ceremonies
- National anthem: Purdue Band
- "Back Home Again in Indiana": Vic Damone
- Starting command: Tony Hulman
- Pace car: Ford Mustang
- Pace car driver: Benson Ford
- Starter: Pat Vidan
- Honorary referee: Raymond Firestone
- Estimated attendance: 300,000

Television in the United States
- Network: MCA (closed-circuit)
- Announcers: Charlie Brockman

Chronology
| Previous | Next |
|---|---|
| 1963 | 1965 |

The 48th International 500-Mile Sweepstakes was held at the Indianapolis Motor Speedway in Speedway, Indiana on Saturday, May 30, 1964. The race was won by A. J. Foyt, but is primarily remembered for a fiery seven-car accident which resulted in the deaths of racers Eddie Sachs and Dave MacDonald. It is also the last race won by a front-engined "roadster", as all subsequent races have been won by rear-engined, formula-style cars. It was Foyt's second of four Indy 500 victories.

Jim Clark, who finished second the previous year, won the pole position in the Lotus 34 quad-cam Ford V-8. He took the lead at the start, and led for a total of 14 laps. However, a tire failure caused a broken suspension, and he dropped out on lap 47. Team manager Colin Chapman had chosen special soft-compound Dunlop tires for qualifying, and the rules dictated that the same type of tires be used for the race, where they suffered from a high wear rate. Clark's Lotus teammate Dan Gurney was later pulled from the race after experiencing similar tire wear.

Bobby Marshman led during the early stages of the race, at one point stretching his lead to as much as 90 seconds. During his aggressive charge in front, he became uncharacteristically obsessed with putting A. J. Foyt a lap down. On lap 39, he went too low in turn one, bottoming out the car, and dropped out with a broken transmission oil plug. Defending race champion Parnelli Jones later dropped out after his car caught fire after he exited his pit box, crashing it into the outside pit wall. With Marshman, Clark, and Jones all out of the race, A. J. Foyt cruised to victory, leading the final 146 laps.

Race winner Foyt drove the whole 500 miles without changing tires. Goodyear supplied tires for some entries, but participated only in practice. No cars used Goodyear tires during the race itself. Foyt's 1964 winning car remains the only car in the collection of the Indianapolis Motor Speedway Hall of Fame and Museum, regularly on display, that has never been restored to pre race condition.

== Time trials ==
Time trials were scheduled for four days.

- Saturday May 16 – Pole Day time trials
  - Rodger Ward was the first to make headlines, as he set a one-lap record of 157.563 mph (253.573 km/h), and a four-lap average of 156.406 mph (251.711 km/h). Bobby Marshman raised the record to 157.867 mph (254.062 km/h). Jim Clark took pole position with a record-setting run. His second lap set the one-lap track record at 159.337 mph (256.428 km/h), and his four-lap average was a record 158.828 mph (255.609 km/h). Clark became the first foreign-born pole-sitter since 1919. The following weekend, Clark traveled to Europe and won the Dutch Grand Prix.
- Sunday May 17 – Second day time trials
- Saturday May 23 – Third day time trials
- Sunday May 24 – Fourth day time trials

== Starting grid ==
| Row | Inside | | Middle | | Outside | |
|---|---|---|---|---|---|---|
| 1 | 6 | (United Kingdom) Jim Clark | 51 | (United States) Bobby Marshman | 2 | (United States) Rodger Ward W |
| 2 | 98 | (United States) Parnelli Jones W | 1 | (United States) A. J. Foyt W | 12 | (United States) Dan Gurney |
| 3 | 18 | (United States) Lloyd Ruby | 66 | (United States) Len Sutton | 5 | (United States) Don Branson |
| 4 | 53 | (United States) Walt Hansgen R | 56 | (United States) Jim Hurtubise | 23 | (United States) Dick Rathmann |
| 5 | 88 | (United States) Johnny Boyd | 83 | (United States) Dave MacDonald R | 86 | (United States) Johnny Rutherford |
| 6 | 64 | (United States) Ronnie Duman R | 25 | (United States) Eddie Sachs | 14 | (United States) Troy Ruttman W |
| 7 | 15 | (United States) Bud Tingelstad | 16 | (United States) Bobby Grim | 99 | (United States) Johnny White R |
| 8 | 9 | (United States) Bobby Unser | 54 | (United States) Bob Veith | 84 | (United States) Eddie Johnson |
| 9 | 52 | (Australia) Jack Brabham | 28 | (United States) Jim McElreath | 4 | (United States) Bob Harkey R |
| 10 | 77 | (United States) Bob Mathouser R | 95 | (United States) Chuck Stevenson | 3 | (United States) Art Malone |
| 11 | 26 | (United States) Norm Hall | 68 | (United States) Bob Wente R | 62 | (United States) Bill Cheesbourg |

R Indianapolis 500 rookie
W Indianapolis 500 winner

=== Alternates ===
- First alternate: Paul Russo (#21)

=== Failed to Qualify ===
- Chuck Arnold (#47, #71, #75)
- Duane Carter (#47, #75)
- Bob Christie (#33)
- Elmer George (#21)
- Jerry Grant R (#45)
- Masten Gregory R (#82)
- Cliff Griffith (#35)
- Don Horvath R - Took rookie test
- Chuck Hulse (#7) - Driver declined, injury
- Bobby Johns R (#47)
- Dee Jones R (#65)
- Ed Kostenuk R
- Jud Larson (#85)
- Ralph Ligouri R (#38)
- Al Miller (#93)
- Pedro Rodriguez R (#48)
- Chuck Rodee (#81)
- Gig Stephens R
- Dempsey Wilson (#8)

== Sachs/MacDonald crash ==
=== Sears-Allstate Special ===
Dave MacDonald was driving a car owned and designed by Mickey Thompson, the #83 Sears-Allstate Special. It was a rear-engined car that first raced in 1963, updated with a streamlined body for 1964. The car utilized Allstate tires, manufactured by Armstrong Tire and Rubber Co. Due to rule changes by USAC for 1964, the car was required to utilize 15 in (380 mm) tires (it previously used 12 in (300 mm) ones). The wheels were most notably enclosed in the front and the rear by streamlined bodywork, intended to take advantage of aerodynamic effects to increase top speeds. However, it is believed that the wheel encasements, as well as the bodywork in general, made the car difficult to handle.

The fuel tanks were located in the sidepods of the car surrounding the cockpit, and held exactly 75 gallons of fuel, per race USAC rules as published in the race programs sold trackside. The tanks each had a single bladder installed by the late Dave Zieger, in a fiberglass shell supported by the fill neck and a molded fiberglass body housing and a flat thin magnesium plate beneath the tank, braced by two steel straps hanging from the top rails of the frame. Following the crash, numerous erroneous accounts described the tanks as oversized, some claiming they held upwards of 80 US gal (67 imp gal; 300 L). An urban legend circulated that Thompson was boasting plans to drive the entire 500 miles without a pit stop, using an oversized fuel tank, but this has been proven false. The crashworthiness of the car and the fuel cell was brought into question at the time.

=== Practice and qualifying ===
During practice, it was discovered immediately that the car's handling was seriously flawed. Masten Gregory complained that aerodynamic lift reduced the steering response. Gregory suffered a crash on May 6, and quit the team due to what he believed was a terribly-handling car.

Dave MacDonald managed to qualify his car without incident. Eddie Johnson qualified the second team car. On Carburetion Day, MacDonald tested the car, with conflicting accounts on whether he ever drove with a full load of fuel. Other drivers in the paddock were known to be concerned about the car, and at least one account claimed that 1963 pole winner and reigning Formula One World Champion Jim Clark advised MacDonald to get out of the car. Another Formula One driver and future Indy 500 winner Graham Hill had actually tested the car at the speedway in 1963 but had refused to drive it because of its bad handling.

The Thompson team conducted aerodynamic testing with wool tufts and confirmed that the full body over the tires was creating lift. The body was cut away over the tires.

=== Crash ===
On the first lap, MacDonald passed at least five other cars. As he passed Johnny Rutherford and Sachs, Rutherford noticed MacDonald's car was handling poorly, zig-zagging, and throwing grass and dirt up from the edge of the track. Rutherford later said, watching the behavior of MacDonald's car, he thought, "he's either gonna win this thing or crash." Eyewitness accounts and film footage are inconsistent about the exact details of MacDonald's first two laps, but it is generally agreed he was attempting to pass many cars.

On the second lap, MacDonald's car spun coming off turn four, as he was turning down below the groove to pass Jim Hurtubise and Walt Hansgen. The car slid across the track and hit the inside wall, igniting the gasoline in the tank and resulting in a massive fire. His car then slid back across the track, causing seven more cars to be involved. Ronnie Duman crashed, spun in flames and hit the pit lane wall, and was burned. Bobby Unser hit Duman's car from behind, and Johnny Rutherford's car on its left rear tire, and crashed into the outside wall. Chuck Stevenson and Norm Hall also crashed.

Sachs aimed for an opening along the outside wall, but MacDonald's burning car slid into his path. Sachs hit MacDonald's car broadside, causing a second explosion; Sachs died instantly, although it remains unknown if he died of blunt force trauma or incendiary injuries. Despite Sachs's body being trapped in the burning car, his driver's suit was only scorched and he received burns on his face and hands. The car was covered with a tarp before being towed to the garage area for removal of his body. A lemon that had been on a string around Sachs's neck was found inside Rutherford's engine compartment after the crash.

MacDonald was pulled from the wreckage and taken into the infield hospital. Although very badly burned, he was alive. His lungs were seared from flame inhalation, causing acute pulmonary edema. He died at 13:20 after being taken to Methodist Hospital.

The crash was well documented in film and still images, and shown worldwide. For the first time in its history, the Indianapolis 500 was stopped because of an accident. Partially in response to media pressure, USAC mandated cars carry less fuel (and crafted the rules to effectively eliminate the use of gasoline, effective for the 1965 season). This resulted in a change to methanol fuel, with a switch to ethanol starting in 2006, although gasoline returned in 2012 with the introduction of the current E85 formula of 85% ethanol and 15% gasoline. Another response to the crash was the 1965 introduction of the Firestone "RaceSafe" fuel cell, with technology used in military helicopters.

The Sachs/MacDonald crash came just six days after the fiery crash of Fireball Roberts at the World 600. Roberts died about a month later, on July 2, 1964. The sense of gloom within the American racing community was further compounded when, just a week after the tragedy at Indianapolis, popular driver Jim Hurtubise was critically burned at Milwaukee.

=== 2016 reunion ===
The crash deeply disturbed the MacDonald family. Members of MacDonald's family avoided visiting the Speedway. Closure was not met until son Rich MacDonald began researching his father's career, with the DaveMacDonald.net Web domain since 2003 a tribute to his father's accomplishments and a family diary to the modern era, meeting Sachs's son Edward Julius III (known as Eddie Jr) on social media. Curt Cavin, an Indianapolis Star reporter, was able to contact MacDonald first, and shortly afterwards, contacted Sachs. Along with other contacts, most notably Angela Savage, daughter of Swede Savage, killed in the 1973 race, whose first visit to the 500 was celebrated in 2014 and has become an annual visit, the MacDonalds were able to meet at the Speedway again.

At the 2016 Indianapolis 500, Sherry MacDonald, Dave's widow and son Rich MacDonald appeared for race day, and were joined by Eddie Sachs III. All three took a photo near the site of the fatal crash, the wall which had been heightened and where track boxes had been removed in time for the 1974, that at the time was marked by the series fuel supplier sign behind the wall, which since 2000 has been the pit lane exit for clockwise road course events.

Earlier in 2016, Rich MacDonald appeared in a podcast presented by Angela Savage, the posthumously born daughter of Swede (killed at the 1973 race), which struck a friendship between the two children of the fallen racers. Rich and Angela appeared together at events until his June 2024 death to cancer.

== Box score ==
Beginning in 1964, the time allowed for drivers behind the winner to complete the 200-lap race distance was reduced to "approximately five minutes of extra time", whereas before 1964, several minutes might be granted for the purpose. This five-minute time allowance was allowed until 1974, after which all drivers were flagged off the track after the winner crossed the line.

| Finish | Start | No | Name | Chassis | Engine | Tire | Qual | Laps | Status | Points |
|---|---|---|---|---|---|---|---|---|---|---|
| 1 | 5 | 1 | (United States) A. J. Foyt W | Watson | Offenhauser | F | 154.672 | 200 | 147.350 mph | 1000 |
| 2 | 3 | 2 | (United States) Rodger Ward W | Watson | Ford | F | 156.406 | 200 | +1:24.35 | 800 |
| 3 | 7 | 18 | (United States) Lloyd Ruby | Watson | Offenhauser | F | 153.932 | 200 | +4:16.47 | 700 |
| 4 | 21 | 99 | (United States) Johnny White R | Watson | Offenhauser | F | 150.893 | 200 | +5:53.49 | 600 |
| 5 | 13 | 88 | (United States) Johnny Boyd | Kuzma | Offenhauser | F | 151.835 | 200 | +7:09.52 | 500 |
| 6 | 19 | 15 | (United States) Bud Tingelstad | Trevis | Offenhauser | F | 151.210 | 198 | Flagged (-2 laps) | 400 |
| 7 | 12 | 23 | (United States) Dick Rathmann | Watson | Offenhauser | F | 151.860 | 197 | Flagged (-3 laps) | 300 |
| 8 | 27 | 4 | (United States) Bob Harkey R | Watson | Offenhauser | F | 151.573 | 197 | Flagged (-3 laps) | 250 |
| 9 | 32 | 68 | (United States) Bob Wente R | Trevis | Offenhauser | F | 149.869 | 197 | Flagged (-3 laps) | 200 |
| 10 | 20 | 16 | (United States) Bobby Grim | Kurtis Kraft | Offenhauser | F | 151.038 | 196 | Flagged (-4 laps) | 150 |
| 11 | 30 | 3 | (United States) Art Malone | Kurtis Kraft | Novi | F | 151.222 | 194 | Flagged (-6 laps) | 100 |
| 12 | 9 | 5 | (United States) Don Branson | Watson | Offenhauser | F | 152.672 | 187 | Clutch | 50 |
| 13 | 10 | 53 | (United States) Walt Hansgen R | Huffaker | Offenhauser | F | 152.581 | 176 | Flagged (-24 laps) | |
| 14 | 11 | 56 | (United States) Jim Hurtubise | Watson | Offenhauser | F | 152.542 | 141 | Oil pressure | |
| 15 | 8 | 66 | (United States) Len Sutton | Vollstedt | Offenhauser | F | 153.813 | 140 | Magneto | |
| 16 | 33 | 62 | (United States) Bill Cheesbourg | Epperly | Offenhauser | F | 148.711 | 131 | Engine | |
| 17 | 6 | 12 | (United States) Dan Gurney | Lotus | Ford | D | 154.487 | 110 | Tire wear | |
| 18 | 18 | 14 | (United States) Troy Ruttman W | Watson | Offenhauser | F | 151.292 | 99 | Spun T3 | |
| 19 | 23 | 54 | (United States) Bob Veith | Huffaker | Offenhauser | F | 153.381 | 88 | Piston | |
| 20 | 25 | 52 | (Australia) Jack Brabham | Brabham | Offenhauser | F | 152.504 | 77 | Fuel tank | |
| 21 | 26 | 28 | (United States) Jim McElreath | Kurtis Kraft | Novi | F | 152.381 | 77 | Filter system | |
| 22 | 28 | 77 | (United States) Bob Mathouser R | Walther | Offenhauser | F | 151.451 | 77 | Brakes | |
| 23 | 4 | 98 | (United States) Parnelli Jones W | Watson | Offenhauser | F | 155.099 | 55 | Pit lane fire | |
| 24 | 1 | 6 | (United Kingdom) Jim Clark | Lotus | Ford | D | 158.828 | 47 | Suspension | |
| 25 | 2 | 51 | (United States) Bobby Marshman | Lotus | Ford | F | 157.857 | 39 | Oil plug | |
| 26 | 24 | 84 | (United States) Eddie Johnson | Thompson | Ford | S | 152.905 | 6 | Fuel pump | |
| 27 | 15 | 86 | (United States) Johnny Rutherford | Watson | Offenhauser | F | 151.400 | 2 | Crash FS | |
| 28 | 29 | 95 | (United States) Chuck Stevenson | Watson | Offenhauser | F | 150.830 | 2 | Crash FS | |
| 29 | 14 | 83 | (United States) Dave MacDonald R ✝ | Thompson | Ford | S | 151.464 | 1 | Crash FS | |
| 30 | 17 | 25 | (United States) Eddie Sachs ✝ | Halibrand | Ford | F | 151.439 | 1 | Crash FS | |
| 31 | 16 | 64 | (United States) Ronnie Duman R | Trevis | Offenhauser | F | 149.744 | 1 | Crash FS | |
| 32 | 22 | 9 | (United States) Bobby Unser | Ferguson | Novi | F | 154.865 | 1 | Crash FS | |
| 33 | 31 | 26 | (United States) Norm Hall | Watson | Offenhauser | F | 150.094 | 1 | Crash FS | |

W Former Indianapolis 500 winner

R Indianapolis 500 Rookie

=== Race statistics ===
Lap Leaders
| Laps | Leader |
|---|---|
| 1–6 | Jim Clark |
| 7–39 | Bobby Marshman |
| 40–47 | Jim Clark |
| 48–54 | Parnelli Jones |
| 55–200 | A. J. Foyt |

Total laps led
| Driver | Laps |
|---|---|
| A. J. Foyt | 146 |
| Bobby Marshman | 33 |
| Jim Clark | 14 |
| Parnelli Jones | 7 |

Yellow Lights: 30 minutes, 17 seconds
| Laps* | Reason |
|---|---|
| 2–3 | Sachs/MacDonald crash (red flag) |
| 37–41 | Bob Mathouser spun in turn 3 (9 minutes) |
| 47–48 | Jim Clark lost wheel in turn 1 (3 minutes) |
| 109–110 | Troy Ruttman spun in turn 3 (2 minutes, 46 seconds) |
| 120 | Debris from Walt Hansgen's car |
| 165 | Spin turn 3 |
* - Approximate lap counts

Tire participation chart
| Supplier | No. of starters |
|---|---|
| Firestone | 29* |
| Dunlop | 2 |
| Sears Allstate | 2 |
| Goodyear | Practice only |
* - Denotes race winner

== Gallery ==
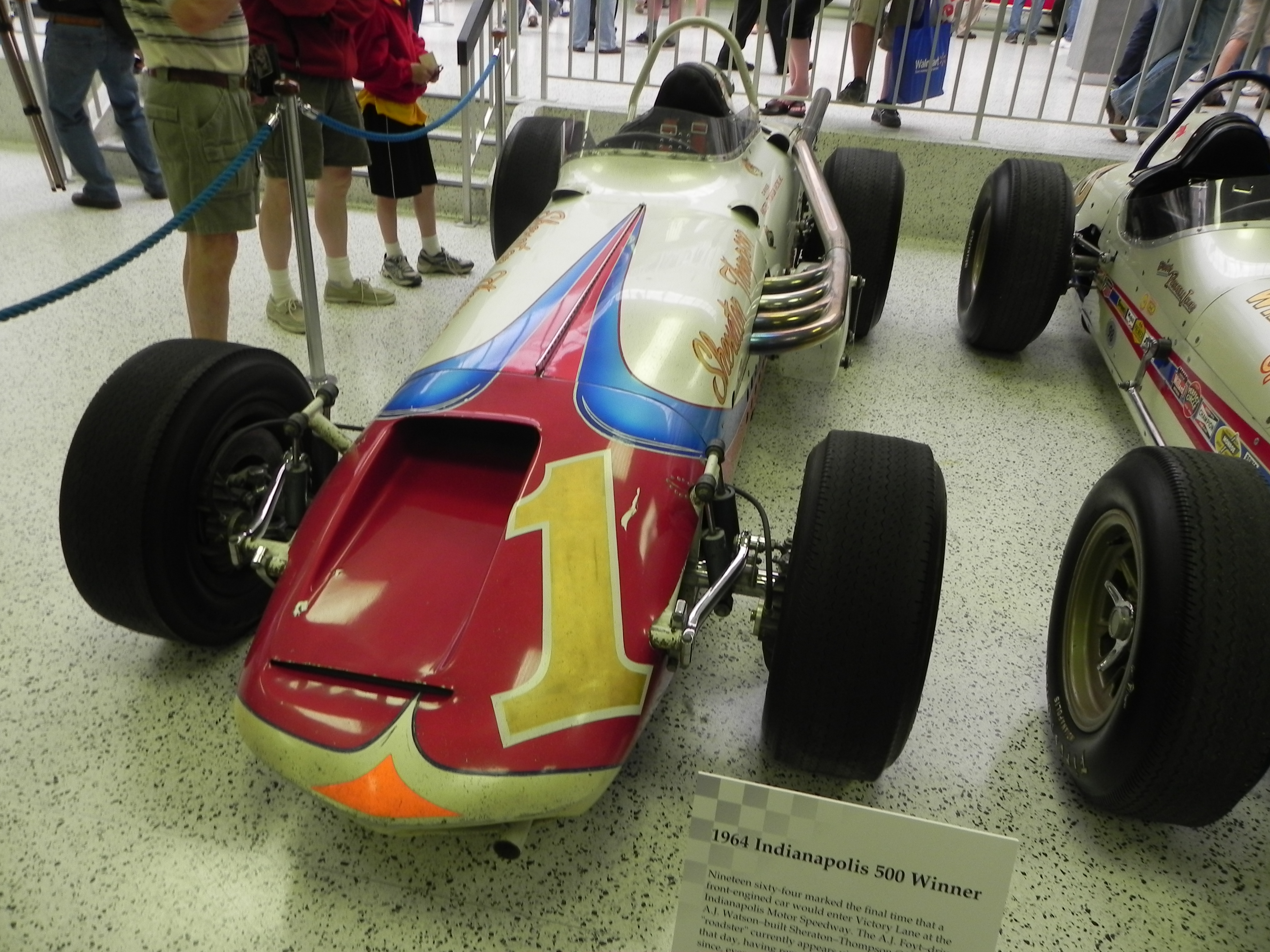
1964 winning car

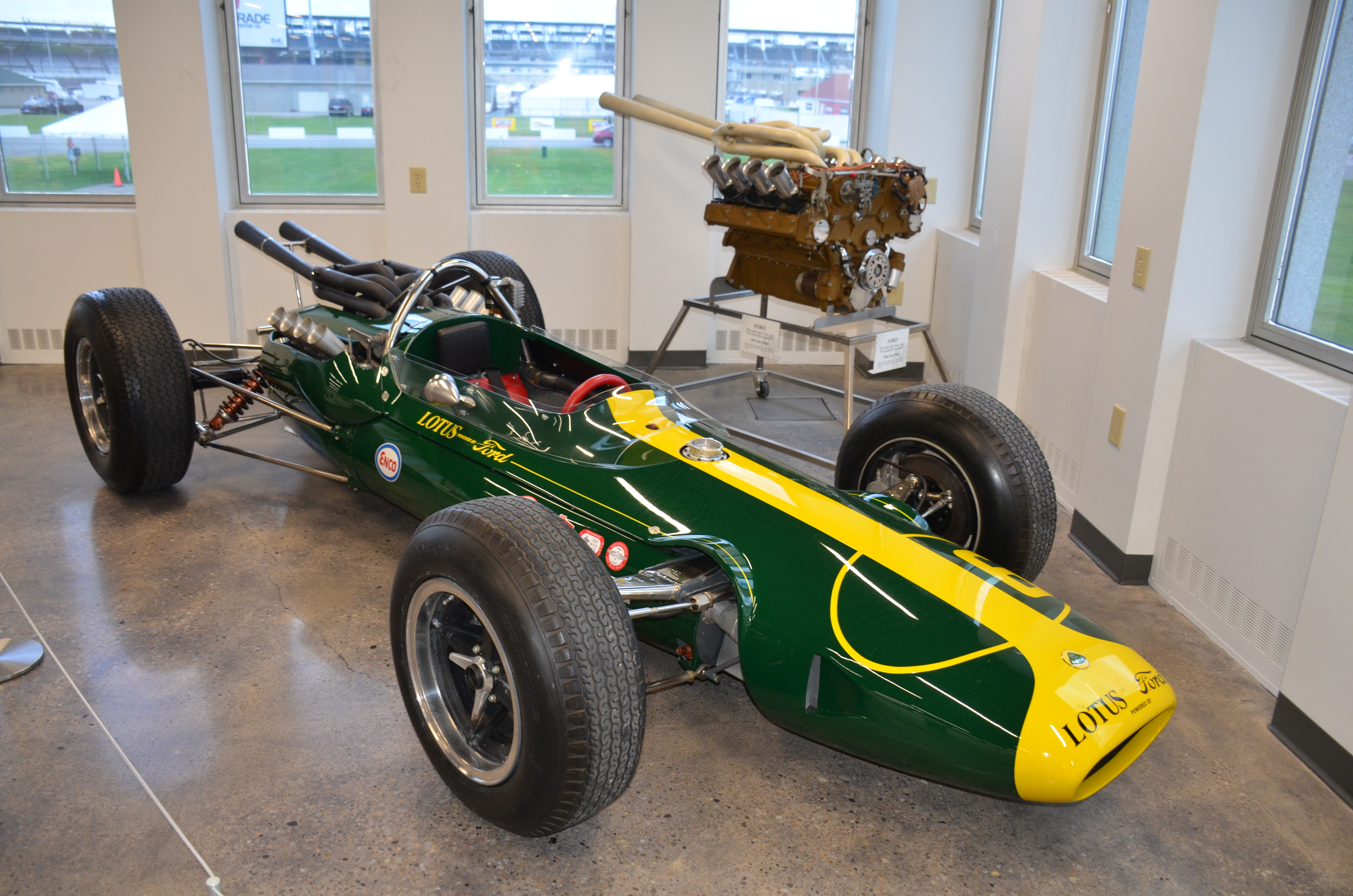
1964 pole winning car

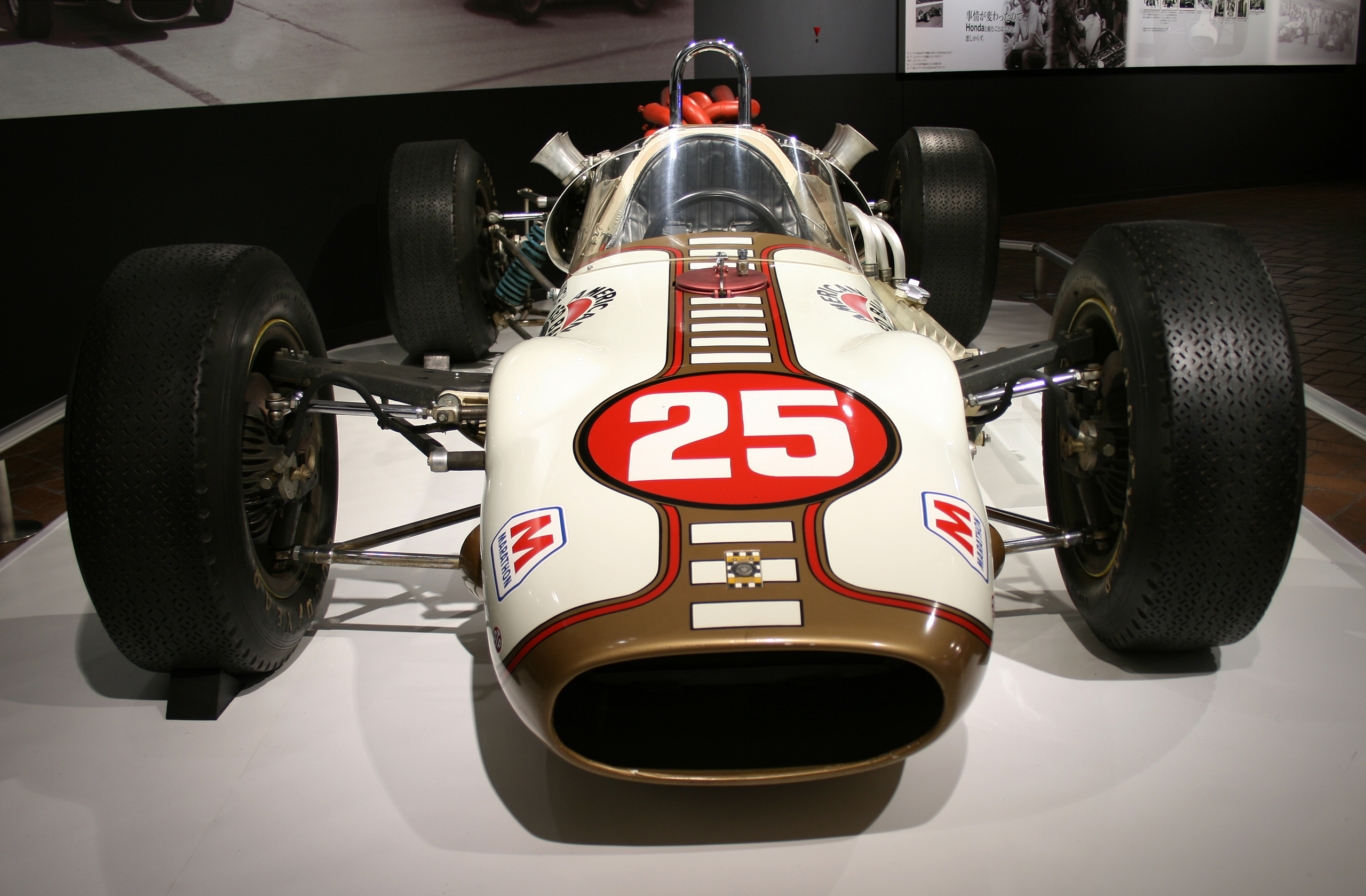
1964 American Red Ball entry

== Broadcasting ==
For the first time ever, the race was shown live, flag-to-flag, on closed-circuit television in theater venues across the country. Charlie Brockman served as the anchor. A few minutes of filmed highlights appeared a week later on ABC's "Wide World Of Sports"

=== Radio ===
The race was carried live on the IMS Radio Network. Sid Collins served as chief announcer. Fred Agabashian served as "driver expert." Lou Palmer conducted the winner's interview in victory lane. The broadcast was carried by a record 558 affiliates in the United States. With the addition of WJAR-AM in Providence, Rhode Island, for the first time, the broadcast was carried by at least one affiliate originating in all 50 states (listeners in that state would otherwise rely on the network's affiliates in Boston and Hartford). The broadcast featured a 30-minute pre-race.

Bernie Herman departed the crew, and newcomer Chuck Marlowe was stationed at the backstretch location. During the broadcast, a young Donald Davidson visited the booth, and made a brief appearance for an interview. Charlie Brockman left the radio crew permanently in 1964 to take over anchoring the MCA closed-circuit television broadcast. John DeCamp joined the booth to serve as statistician. Other guests in the booth included Pete DePaolo, and Indiana Governor Matthew E. Welsh.

Indianapolis Motor Speedway Radio Network
| Booth Announcers | Turn Reporters | Pit/garage reporters |
|---|---|---|
| Chief Announcer: Sid Collins; Driver expert: Fred Agabashian; Statistician: John DeCamp | Turn 1: Bill Frosh; Turn 2: Howdy Bell; Backstretch: Chuck Marlowe R Turn 3: Mike Ahern; Turn 4: Jim Shelton | Jack Shapiro (north pits); Luke Walton (center pits); Lou Palmer (south pits) |

=== Eddie Sachs eulogy ===
During the live radio broadcast of the race, IMS Radio Network anchor Sid Collins drew critical praise for an impromptu on-air eulogy for Eddie Sachs. During the red flag, track public address announcer Tom Carnegie made the official announcement of the death of Sachs (MacDonald had not yet expired, and his death was not announced until later). The announcement was simulcast on the radio feed.

"It is with deepest regret that we make this announcement. Driver Eddie Sachs was fatally injured in the accident on the mainstraightaway."

Silence was heard on-air for about five seconds, and at that point, Collins chimed in with a solemn, unprepared eulogy:

You heard the announcement from the public address system. There's not a sound. Men are taking off their hats. People are weeping, over three hundred thousand fans, here; not moving; disbelieving. Some men try to conquer life in a number of ways. These days of our outer space attempts, some men try to conquer the universe. Race drivers are courageous men who try to conquer life and death, and they calculate their risks. And in our talking with them over the years, I think we know their inner thoughts in regards to racing: they take it as part of living. No one is moving on the race track. They're standing silently. A race driver who leaves this earth mentally, when he straps himself into the cockpit, to try what for to him is the biggest conquest he can make, is aware of the odds, and Eddie Sachs played the odds. He was serious and frivolous. He was fun. He was a wonderful gentleman. He took much needling and he gave much needling. And just as the astronauts do perhaps, these boys on the race track ask no quarter and they give none. If they succeed they're a hero, and if they fail, they tried. And it was Eddie's desire, I'm sure, and will to try with everything he had, which he always did. So the only healthy way perhaps we can approach the tragedy of the loss of a friend like Eddie Sachs is to know that he would have wanted us to face it, as he did: as it has happened, not as we wish it would have happened. It is God's will, I'm sure, and we must accept that. We're all speeding towards death at the rate of sixty minutes every hour. The only difference is that we don't know how to speed faster, and Eddie Sachs did. So as since death has a thousand or more doors, Eddie Sachs exits this earth in a race car. And knowing Eddie, I assume that's the way he would have wanted it...

...Byron said 'who the gods love, die young'. Eddie was 37. To his widow Nance we extend our extreme sympathy and regret. And to his two children. This boy won the pole here in 1961 and 1962 [sic], and was a proud race driver. Well, as we do at Indianapolis and in racing: as the World Champion Jimmy Clark I'm sure would agree, as he's raced all over the world: the race continues. Unfortunately today, without Eddie Sachs. And we'll be restarting it in just a few moments.

Collins received over 30,000 letters requesting a transcript of the eulogy. Rebroadcasts of the speech in subsequent years have generally omitted Collins's reference to Sachs's consecutive pole positions, due to his accidental misattribution of their being won a year later than they actually were, in 1960 and 1961.

== Notes ==
=== Works cited ===
- Indianapolis 500 History: Race & All-Time Stats - Official Site
- 1964 Indianapolis 500 Radio Broadcast, Indianapolis Motor Speedway Radio Network

=== Bibliography ===
- Garner, Art (May 6, 2014). Black Noon: The Year They Stopped the Indy 500. Thomas Dunne Books. ISBN 978-1250017789.

| 1963 Indianapolis 500; Parnelli Jones | 1964 Indianapolis 500; A. J. Foyt | 1965 Indianapolis 500; Jim Clark |
| Preceded by 143.137 mph (1963 Indianapolis 500) | Record for the fastest average speed 147.350 mph | Succeeded by 150.686 mph (1965 Indianapolis 500) |
