= Eddie Sachs =

American racing driver (1927–1964)

- Born: Edward Julius Sachs Jr. May 28, 1927 Allentown, Pennsylvania, U.S.
- Died: May 30, 1964 (aged 37) Speedway, Indiana, U.S.

Champ Car career
- 65 races run over 13 years
- Years active: 1951, 1953–1964
- Best finish: 2nd – 1961
- First race: 1953 Golden State 100 (Sacramento)
- Last race: 1964 Indianapolis 500 (Indianapolis)
- First win: 1956 Atlanta 100 (Lakewood)
- Last win: 1961 Trenton 100 (Trenton)
| Wins | Podiums | Poles |
|---|---|---|
| 8 | 19 | 4 |

Formula One World Championship career
- Active years: 1953–1954, 1956–1960
- Team(s): Schroeder, Kurtis Kraft, Kuzma, Ewing
- Entries: 7 (4 starts)
- Championships: 0
- Wins: 0
- Podiums: 0
- Career points: 0
- Pole positions: 1
- Fastest laps: 0
- First entry: 1953 Indianapolis 500
- Last entry: 1960 Indianapolis 500

Edward Julius Sachs Jr. (May 28, 1927 – May 30, 1964) was an American racing driver in the United States Auto Club.

== Early life ==
Sachs was born May 28, 1927, in Allentown, Pennsylvania. He served in the United States Navy during World War II.

== Professional racing career ==
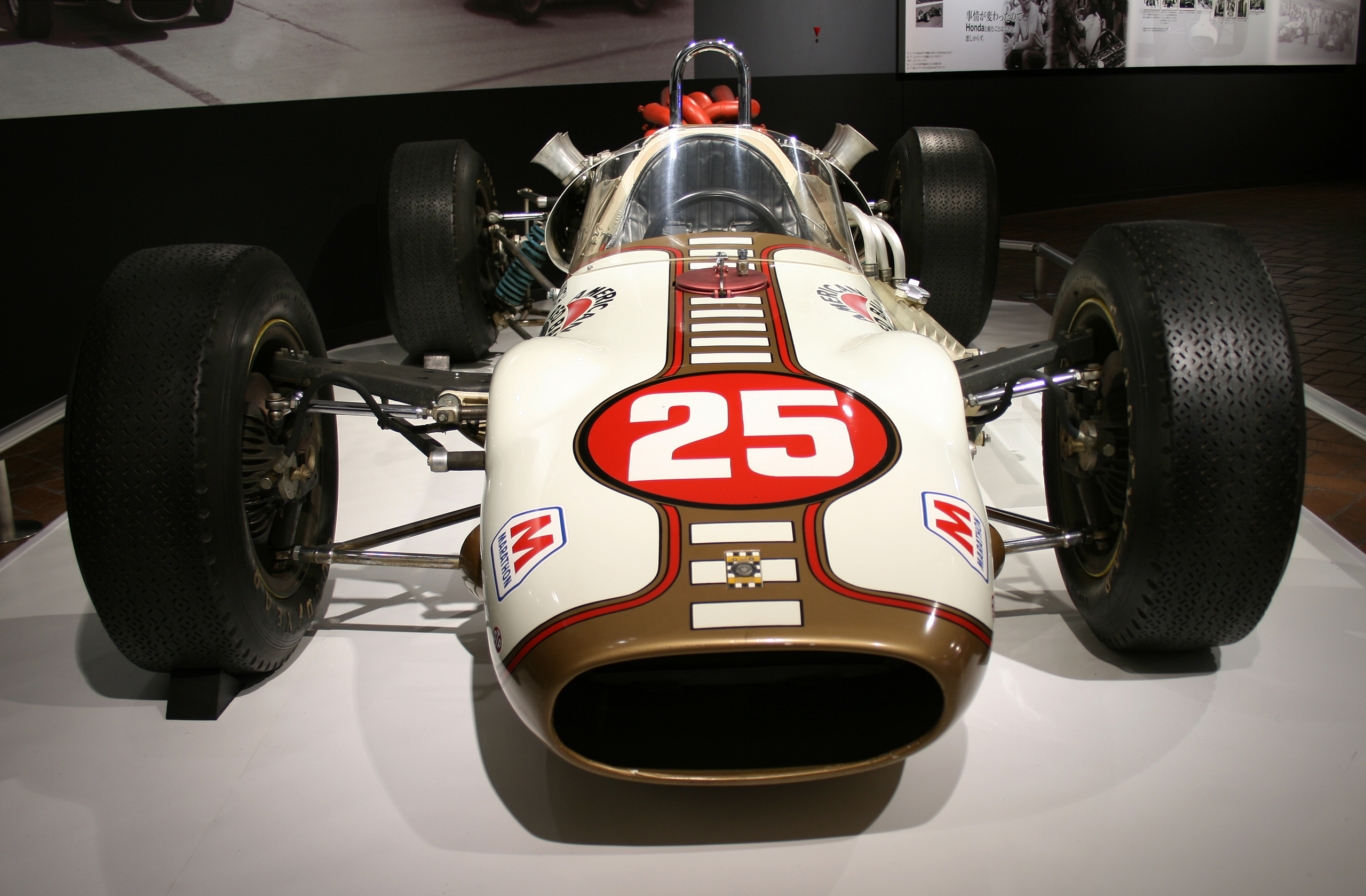
A restored Halibrand-Ford "American Red Ball Special" similar to that being driven by Sachs when he was killed in a fiery crash at the 1964 Indianapolis 500

Sachs' career included eight USAC Championship Trail wins, 25 top-five finishes in 65 career AAA and USAC starts, including the 1958 USAC Midwest Sprint Car Championship. He was an eight time starter of the Indianapolis 500, 1957–64, winning the pole position in 1960 and 1961, with his best finish being second in 1961. Leading the race with only three laps to go, he saw his right rear tire begin to delaminate and pitted to replace it, handing victory to A. J. Foyt. Sachs never regretted his decision not to gamble on the tire, saying, "I'd sooner finish second than be dead".

Sachs was known as the "Clown Prince of Auto Racing" and coined the phrase "If you can't win, be spectacular".

=== Death at Indianapolis ===
At the 1964 Indianapolis 500 on May 30, 1964, Sachs and sports car driver Dave MacDonald, an Indianapolis 500 rookie, were killed in a fiery crash involving seven cars on the second lap. MacDonald was driving a car owned and designed by Mickey Thompson, the No. 83 "Sears-Allstate Special". Thompson had requested USAC officials to visit his shop in California to inspect the car while it was under construction so that he would not invest money in the car if there was a chance that it would be disqualified at the Speedway.

MacDonald lost control coming off the fourth turn. As the car began to slide, he came across the track and hit the inside wall, igniting the 45-gallon fuel load which erupted into a massive fire. His car then slid back across the track. Sachs, following Bob Veith, aimed for an opening along the outside wall that was soon closed by MacDonald's burning car. Veith made it through by inches, but Sachs hit MacDonald's car broadside causing a second explosion. Johnny Rutherford, following Sachs, having no place to go except into the inferno, decided his only chance was to power his way through. Going at full throttle, his Watson Roadster went under Sachs and over MacDonald taking the injectors off MacDonald's engine. After clearing the wreckage, he was then broadsided by the NOVI of Bobby Unser. He then motored (on fire) down the main straight, through turns one and two, up the back straight and through turn three, stopping at a fire-truck station in turn four. Ronnie Duman, following Rutherford, went to the left to avoid the crash. It looked as if he was going to make it through when he was rear-ended by the out of control NOVI, which had lost its steering, splitting his fuel tank which also erupted. Duman then spun into the infield wall, where he received serious burns.

He was transported to the Methodist Hospital's burn unit in Indianapolis by helicopter to begin a lengthy recovery. Rutherford and Unser received minor burns and were released from the track hospital. MacDonald, whose lungs were scorched from inhaling the flames and who was burned over 75% of his body, was awake and alert when he was removed from his car. He was taken to the track hospital then transferred to the Methodist Hospital burn unit by ambulance, where he died two hours later. Chuck Stevenson and Norm Hall were also involved but escaped injury.

Despite being trapped in his car, Sachs's driver's suit was only scorched, but he received critical burns on his face and hands. The car was covered with a tarp before being taken to the garage area for removal of his body. It has never been determined if he died of asphyxiation, burns or blunt force injury. One driver stated that he saw him struggling to get out of the car after the impact. A lemon that had been on a string around Sachs's neck was found inside Rutherford's engine compartment after the crash.

The crash was well documented on film and shown worldwide. For the first time in its history, the Indianapolis 500 was stopped because of an accident. Partially in response to media pressure, for subsequent races USAC required that cars carry less fuel and make a mandatory minimum of two pit stops. The new pit-stop rule negated any mileage advantage gasoline-powered cars would have had, so gasoline has not been used since. Every Indianapolis 500 race since 1965 has been run using methanol or ethanol-based fuels.

== World Championship career summary ==
The Indianapolis 500 was part of the FIA World Championship from 1950 through 1960. Drivers competing at Indy during those years were credited with World Championship points and participation. Accordingly, Sachs participated in four World Championship races. He started on the pole once, but scored no World Championship points.

== Awards ==
Sachs was inducted into the National Sprint Car Hall of Fame in 1999.

== Personal life ==
Sachs married Nance McGarrity of Coopersburg, Pennsylvania, on June 3, 1959, at the home of Harry Hamilton, a relative of his car owner, Peter Schmidt in Indianapolis, Indiana. Their son, Edward Julius Sachs, III was born on February 6, 1962. Nance Sachs died on September 28, 2005, at her home in Clinton Township, Michigan. She is survived by her son Edward III, and grandchildren, Edward IV and Meagan Sachs. Forty-one years after his death, she was buried next to her beloved Eddie in Holy Saviour Cemetery in Bethlehem, Pennsylvania. Using the name "Eddie Sachs, Jr," Eddie III became a race car driver racing on the local dirt tracks in the Midwest. Unlike his famous father, he never raced in the Indianapolis 500. He has become a businessman as the owner of Sachs and Associates in Lake Orion, Michigan. He has been a part-time car owner in various levels of motorsport, currently in the USAC Silver Crown Series. Sachs also had a daughter in 1955 with Yvonne Kay Hewitt of Marshall, Illinois. Hewitt married Donald Dean Wallace and gave Eddie's daughter his surname. - Elizabeth Ann Wallace. This was verified through Ancestry.com after a DNA match with Eddie III.

== Complete AAA/USAC Championship Car results ==
| Year | 1 | 2 | 3 | 4 | 5 | 6 | 7 | 8 | 9 | 10 | 11 | 12 | 13 | 14 | 15 | Pos | Points |
|---|---|---|---|---|---|---|---|---|---|---|---|---|---|---|---|---|---|
| 1951 | INDY | MIL | LAN | DAR | SPR | MIL | DUQ | DUQ | PIK | SYR; DNQ | DET | DNC | SJS | PHX | BAY | – | 0 |
| 1953 | INDY; DNQ | MIL | SPR | DET | SPR | MIL | DUQ | PIK | SYR; DNQ | ISF; DNQ | SAC; 18 | PHX; DNQ | | | | – | 0 |
| 1954 | INDY; DNQ | MIL; DNQ | LAN; 5 | DAR; 16 | SPR; DNQ | MIL; DNQ | DUQ | PIK | SYR | ISF; DNQ | SAC; DNQ | PHX; 7 | LVG | | | 29th | 160 |
| 1955 | INDY | MIL | LAN | SPR | MIL; DNS | DUQ | PIK | SYR | ISF; DNQ | SAC | PHX; DNQ | | | | | 45th | 46.8 |
| 1956 | INDY; DNQ | MIL | LAN | DAR; 21 | ATL; 1 | SPR; 3 | MIL; 4 | DUQ; DNQ | SYR; 12 | ISF; DNQ | SAC | PHX; DNQ | | | | 12th | 650 |
| 1957 | INDY; 23 | LAN; 2 | MIL; 16 | DET | ATL | SPR | MIL | DUQ | SYR | ISF | TRE | SAC | PHX | | | 25th | 160 |
| 1958 | TRE; DNQ | INDY; 22 | MIL; 10 | LAN; 1 | ATL; 6 | SPR; DNQ | MIL; 3 | DUQ; 17 | SYR; 10 | ISF; 1 | TRE; 10 | SAC; 15 | PHX; 3 | | | 7th | 990 |
| 1959 | DAY; 19 | TRE; 19 | INDY; 17 | MIL; 7 | LAN; 18 | SPR; 7 | MIL; 10 | DUQ; 18 | SYR; 1 | ISF; 2 | TRE; 1 | SAC; DNQ | PHX; 10 | | | 6th | 797 |
| 1960 | TRE; 8 | INDY; 21 | MIL; 5 | LAN; 13 | SPR; 2 | MIL; 20 | DUQ; 4 | SYR; 11 | ISF; 13 | TRE; 1 | SAC; DNQ | PHX | | | | 12th | 650 |
| 1961 | TRE; 1 | INDY; 2 | MIL; Wth | LAN; 3 | MIL; 5 | SPR; DNS | DUQ; 3 | SYR; DNQ | ISF; DNQ | TRE; 1 | SAC; DNQ | PHX; 6 | | | | 2nd | 1,760 |
| 1962 | TRE; 18 | INDY; 3 | MIL; 21 | LAN | TRE; 15 | SPR | MIL; 4 | LAN | SYR | ISF | TRE; 7 | SAC | PHX | | | 9th | 1,060 |
| 1963 | TRE; 15 | INDY; 17 | MIL; 2 | LAN | TRE; DNQ | SPR | MIL; 24 | DUQ | ISF | TRE; 23 | SAC | PHX | | | | 21st | 160 |
| 1964 | PHX; 6 | TRE; DNQ | INDY; 30 | MIL | LAN | TRE | SPR | MIL | DUQ | ISF | TRE | SAC | PHX | | | 36th | 80 |

== Indianapolis 500 results ==
| Year | Car | Start | Qual | Rank | Finish | Laps | Led | Retired |
|---|---|---|---|---|---|---|---|---|
| 1957 | 88 | 2 | 143.872 | 3rd | 23 | 105 | 0 | Piston |
| 1958 | 88 | 18 | 144.660 | 7 | 22 | 68 | 1 | Universal joint |
| 1959 | 44 | 2 | 145.425 | 2nd | 17 | 182 | 0 | Gear Tower Bolt |
| 1960 | 6 | 1 | 146.592 | 2nd | 21 | 132 | 21 | Magneto |
| 1961 | 12 | 1 | 147.481 | 1st | 2 | 200 | 44 | Running |
| 1962 | 2 | 27 | 146.431 | 27 | 3 | 200 | 0 | Running |
| 1963 | 9 | 10 | 149.570 | 10 | 17 | 181 | 0 | Crash T3 |
| 1964 | 25 | 17 | 151.439 | 22 | 30 | 1 | 0 | Crash FS – Fatal |
| Totals | | | | | | 1069 | 66 | |

| Starts | 8 |
| Poles | 2 |
| Front Row | 4 |
| Wins | 0 |
| Top 5 | 2 |
| Top 10 | 2 |
| Retired | 6 |
