= Dave MacDonald =

American racing driver (1936–1964)

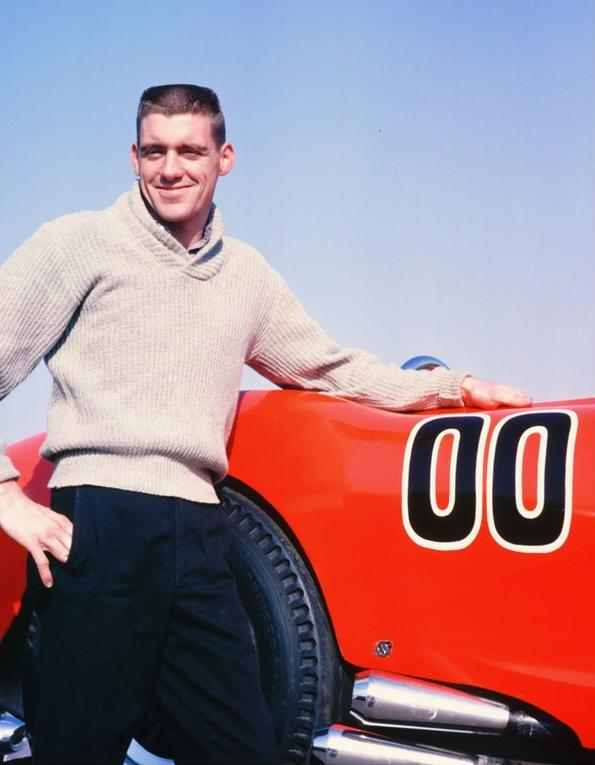
- MacDonald in 1962
- Born: David George MacDonald; July 23, 1936 El Monte, California, U.S.
- Died: May 30, 1964 (aged 27) Indianapolis, Indiana, U.S.

NASCAR Cup Series career
- 7 races run over 2 years
- Best finish: 29th (1964)
- First race: 1963 Riverside 500 (Riverside)
- Last race: 1964 Atlanta 500 (Atlanta)
Wins	Top tens	Poles
0	4	0

Champ Car career
- 1 race run over 1 year
- First race: 1964 Indianapolis 500 (Indianapolis)
Wins	Podiums	Poles
0	0	0

David George MacDonald (July 23, 1936 – May 30, 1964) was an American racing driver noted for his successes driving Corvettes and Shelby Cobras in the early 1960s. He was killed in the 1964 Indianapolis 500, along with fellow driver Eddie Sachs.

== Sports car career ==
MacDonald began racing in 1956, competing in a 1955 Chevrolet Corvette on Southern Californian drag strips.

At the 1958 National Hot Rod Association (NHRA) Western US Drag Racing Championships at Williams Air Force Base in Arizona, MacDonald set two standing start speed records in a stock 1958 Corvette – 104.68 mph in the ¼ mile and 123.11 mph in the 1/2 mile. Between 1958 and 1962, he drove Corvettes to six more speed records in the 1/4, 1/2 and one-mile distances at annual US speed trials.

MacDonald began competing on the road racing circuit in 1960; his first race was at Willow Springs Raceway on February 13 and 14. He drove a 1957 Corvette to a fourth-place finish in the preliminary race, before winning the feature race, recording his first ever victory. By the end of the 1962 season, he had driven Corvettes to 28 victories in 64 races, including 42 top-three finishes. MacDonald's unique style of drifting through turns at full speed made him a crowd favorite and earned him the nickname "Master of Oversteer".

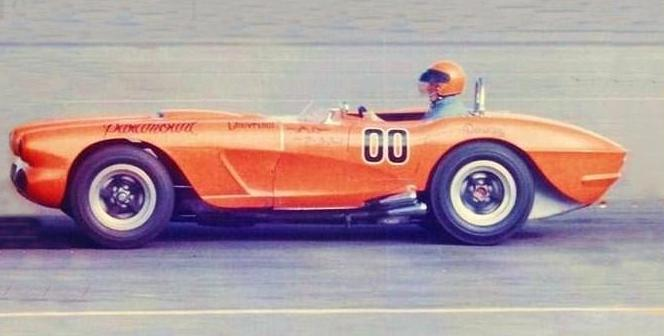
MacDonald in Riverside Raceway win driving his custom No. 00 Corvette Special - March 1962

In June 1962, Zora Arkus-Duntov selected MacDonald and Dick Thompson to do shakedown testing during development of Chevrolet's all new 1963 Corvette Sting Ray. Four days of intensive road testing were performed on a coupe and a convertible at the General Motors Proving Grounds in Milford, Michigan. General Motors (GM) filmed these tests, using the footage to create a promotional film entitled "Biography of a Sports Car". The film was distributed around the globe as part of GM's marketing campaign promoting the new sports car. In September, Duntov and other Chevrolet executives presented MacDonald with the first ever 1963 Z06 Sting Ray. He debuted this car at Riverside Raceway on October 13, 1962. The highly anticipated race also marked the debut of Carroll Shelby’s new Ford Cobra Roadster. MacDonald and Cobra driver Billy Krause exchanged the lead during the first hour of competition, before both vehicles dropped out with mechanical troubles.

MacDonald and Ken Miles in Shelby Cobras finish one-two at Dodger Stadium in March 1963

At the beginning of the 1963 season, Carroll Shelby hired MacDonald away from Chevrolet to drive his Cobra Roadster. MacDonald's first outing for Shelby American was on February 2nd and 3rd at Riverside International Raceway. MacDonald drove Cobra CSX2026 to back-to-back victories; the Cobra’s first wins.

On February 17, 1963, MacDonald finished fourth in Cobra CSX2026 at the Fédération Internationale de l'Automobile (FIA) Daytona Continental, marking the Cobra's first top-five finish in international competition. Shelby retired the 260ci engines after this race and debuted the new Ford 289ci engine at a Sports Car Club of America (SCCA) sanctioned event held at Dodger Stadium between March 3rd and 4th, 1963. MacDonald won both days in the Cobra CSX2026.

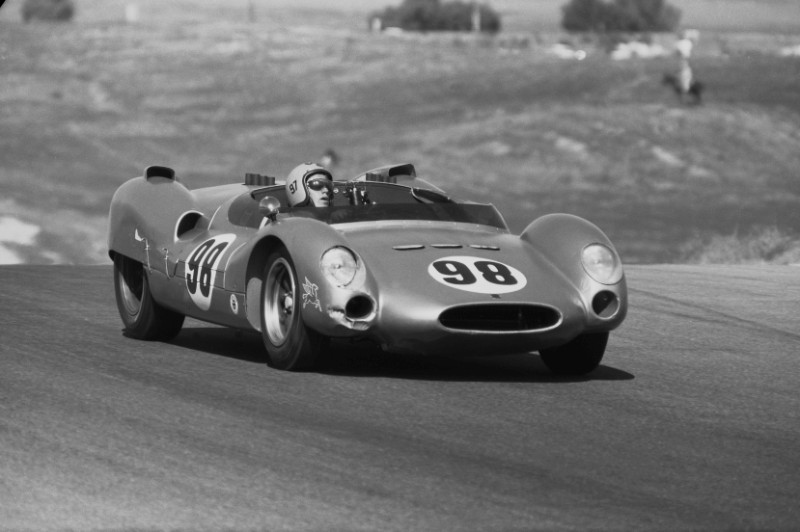
MacDonald wins the 1963 LA Times Grand Prix in Shelby King Cobra CM/1/63

During the fall of 1963, MacDonald rose to national prominence after driving Shelby King Cobra CM/1/63 to back-to-back grand prix wins in the two most prestigious road races in the world – the Los Angeles Times Grand Prix and the Monterey Pacific Grand Prix. These were the first wins for the Shelby King Cobra. He finished second at the Hawaiian Grand Prix in Cobra Roadster CSX2136. In recognition of these recent exploits, as well as of his efforts in Grand National competition, MacDonald was awarded the Helms Athletic Foundation’s "Athlete of the Month" medallion for October 1963. MacDonald was only the ninth auto racer to receive this honor since its inception in 1936, and the first to be awarded it during the US football season.

In 1964, MacDonald committed to a full Cobra schedule with Shelby American. On March 1, 1964, MacDonald won the United States Road Racing Championships at Augusta International Raceway in Shelby King Cobra CM/1/63. His average speed of 97.653 MPH was 11 MPH faster than the previous track record set by Fireball Roberts in the Augusta 510. After this victory, Chris Economaki - editor of National Speed Sport News (NSSN), wrote that, "Dave MacDonald just stamped himself as one of today's road racing greats."

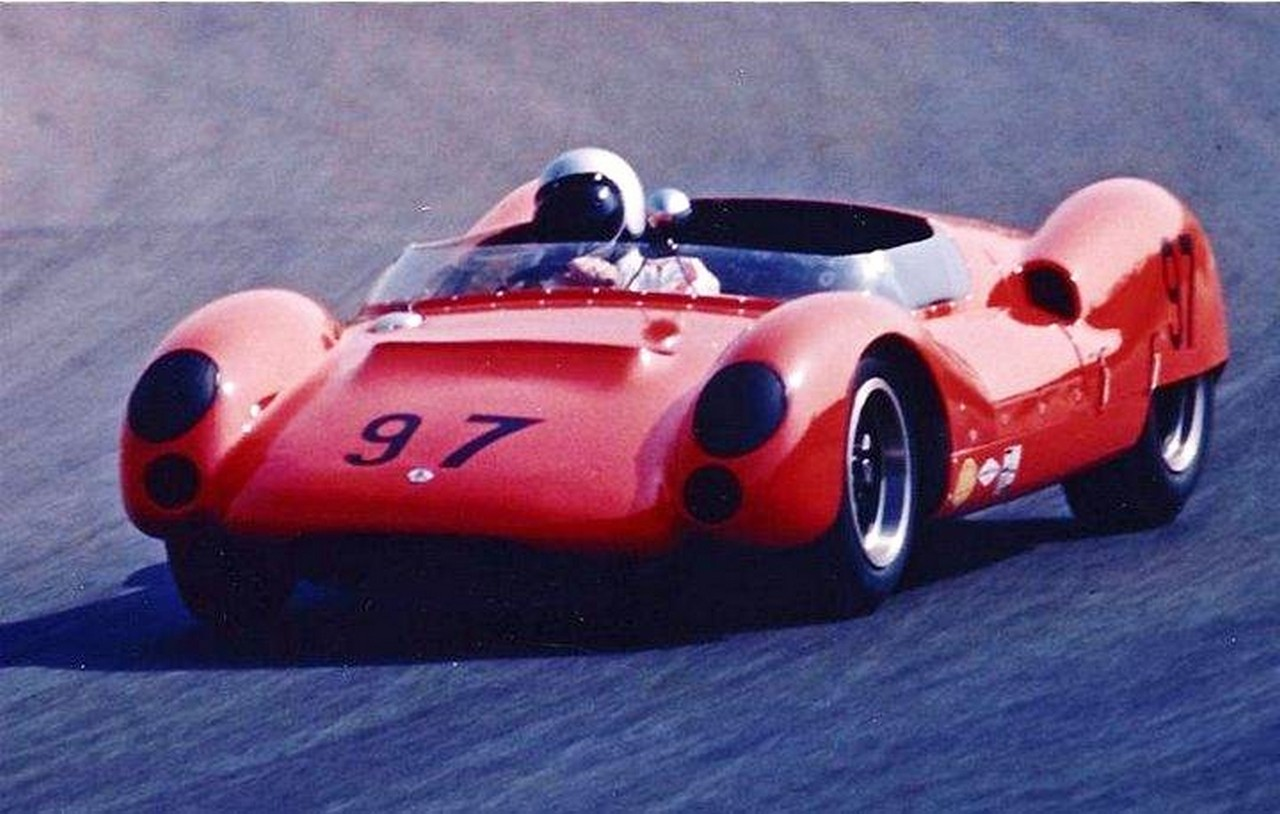
MacDonald in Shelby King Cobra Lang Cooper CM/1/64 at Riverside Int'l Raceway in 1964

On March 21, 1964, MacDonald and co-driver Bob Holbert ran Shelby Cobra Daytona Coupe CSX2287 to the GT Class win (fourth overall) in the 12 Hours of Sebring, breaking Ferrari's 6-year win streak in the Grand Touring Division. On April 19, 1964, MacDonald won the Phoenix FIA National Open at Phoenix International Raceway in Shelby King Cobra-Lang Cooper CM/1/64. This was the debut outing for CM/1/64 and its first win.

On May 3, 1964, MacDonald competed in the United States Road Racing Championships at Laguna Seca Raceway in Shelby King Cobra CM/1/64, finishing 2nd between the Chaparrals of race winner Jim Hall and 3rd-place Roger Penske. On May 10, 1964, MacDonald won the United States Road Racing Championships at Kent, Washington, in King Cobra CM/3/63. The victory put him in a tie atop the USRRC Drivers' Championship standings with Hall, with whom he shared the victory lap. This would be MacDonald's last road race before his death, three weeks later, in the Indianapolis 500.

== NASCAR career ==
In 1963, MacDonald competed in a limited number of National Association for Stock Car Auto Racing (NASCAR) Grand National races. At his first event, the Golden State 400 at Riverside, driving for Jim Simpson, he finished 12th. Later that season, in the Wood Brothers No. 21 Ford, MacDonald finished second behind Holman-Moody teammate and race winner Fireball Roberts in the Augusta 510.

In 1964, MacDonald signed to run 20 races on the Grand National circuit for Mercury team owner Bill Stroppe. On February 23, 1964, MacDonald competed in the Daytona 500, finishing 10th.

== Indianapolis 500 and death ==
In early 1963, MacDonald signed a two-year contract with Mickey Thompson to run the 1964 and 1965 Indianapolis 500s. MacDonald was to drive one of Thompson's radical low profile rear-engine race cars in that year's event. Thompson's Ford-powered racers were specifically designed to run on 12" tires, and had debuted in the 1963 Indianapolis 500 under Chevrolet power. The cars became known as "roller skates". They were far ahead of their time, but badly designed and difficult to drive. Graham Hill tested the car before the 1963 Indianapolis race and refused to drive it due to its poor handling. This condition was made worse in 1964, after Thompson was forced to redesign the cars to accommodate a new United States Auto Club (USAC) mandated 15-inch (380 mm) minimum tire height.

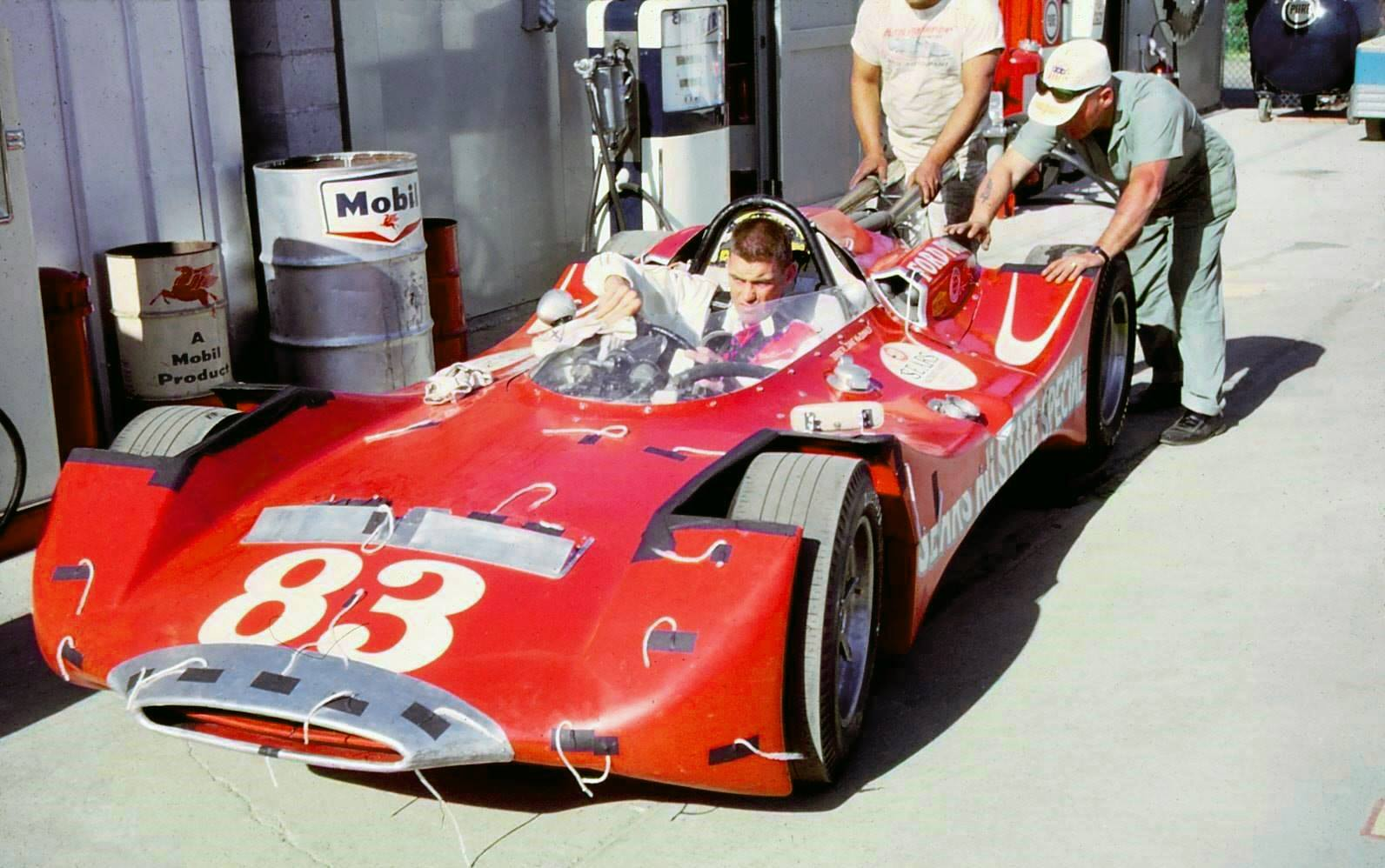
May 1964 – In an effort to release trapped air, Mickey Thompson cut fender channels in his full-bodied Indy cars before sending MacDonald out to run tuft tests

A change Thompson made to improve his cars' stability was to fit them with full-fendered aerodynamic body kits, unheard of in Indianapolis car competition. In addition to MacDonald, a rookie at Indianapolis, Thompson hired veteran road racer Masten Gregory, to drive two of his three cars. Several top Indianapolis veterans had declined offers to drive the revolutionary but undeveloped cars, leaving Thompson without true veteran feedback. Hill tested Thompson's new 1964 design and, as he had the previous year, decided against driving it in the race. Thompson eventually signed veteran Duane Carter to join Gregory and MacDonald.

During the first week of May, all three cars crashed or spun in practice. Gregory abruptly quit the team, citing the poor handling of his car, and Thompson found it difficult to find a replacement, as other available drivers took the advice of Gregory and stayed away. Fifteen-time Indianapolis 500 competitor Eddie Johnson eventually accept Thompson's offer, joined the team mid-May. It was reported that while out practicing with MacDonald on Carb Day, Jim Clark noticed strange movements from MacDonald's car. Clark reportedly followed MacDonald into the pits, and telling him, "get out of that car, mate - just walk away." According to journalist Chris Economaki, MacDonald was never able to practice with a full load of fuel, due to Thompson's focus on high speeds.

MacDonald qualified the Thompson No. 83 car at an average speed of 151.464 mph, placing him in the middle of row five and in the 14th position. Johnson qualified Gregory's reconstructed No. 84 car, placing it on the outside of row eight and in the 24th position. On Bump Day, the final day of qualifying, Thompson hired Chuck Arnold to attempt to place the No. 82 in the field, and drive it in the race. While preparing for his qualifying attempt Arnold spun twice during separate practice runs and walked away from the ride. With just a few hours left in qualifying Thompson sought out Gregory and asked if he would come back to the team and run the No. 82 car. Gregory, still without a ride for the 500, agreed to try and qualify the car, but refused to run it in the race. Gregory's late day attempt fell short on speed and neither he nor the No. 82 ran the 500.

On race day, after dropping two positions on the opening lap, MacDonald began passing cars, moving back up the field. As he passed Johnny Rutherford and Eddie Sachs, Rutherford noticed that MacDonald's car was very loose. Rutherford later said that, while observing the behavior of MacDonald's car, he thought, "Whoa, he's either going to win this thing or crash." MacDonald was in the tenth position as he came out of turn four and on to the front straight to complete lap two. MacDonald moved left to pass Walt Hansgen - a split second later Hangsen moved left to pass Jim Hurtubise. MacDonald moved further left, during which the front end of his car lifted and he lost control.

MacDonald slid across the track and hit the inside retaining wall, igniting the 45 gallon fuel load which caused a massive fire. His car then slid back up the track toward the outside wall, during which time six more cars became involved. Eddie Sachs, blinded by flames and smoke, hit MacDonald's car broadside, resulting in an even larger fire. The race was red-flagged due to the accident - the first such occurrence in 500 history. Sachs died instantly due to blunt-force injuries, while MacDonald was transported to Methodist Hospital of Indianapolis, dying two hours later. After the race was restarted, Johnson retired the other Thompson car after only six laps. The accident led to safety changes at Indianapolis Motor Speedway, including a USAC requirement that cars carry less fuel, a change which led every team to switch from gasoline to methanol prior to the next year's 500. Since the deaths of MacDonald and Sachs, only one driver (Swede Savage) has died as a result of a crash at the Indianapolis 500.

Carroll Shelby, Mickey Thompson, and Bill Stroppe were among the pallbearers at MacDonald's funeral. Shelby later commented that, "Dave MacDonald had more raw talent probably than any race driver I ever saw."

== Notes ==
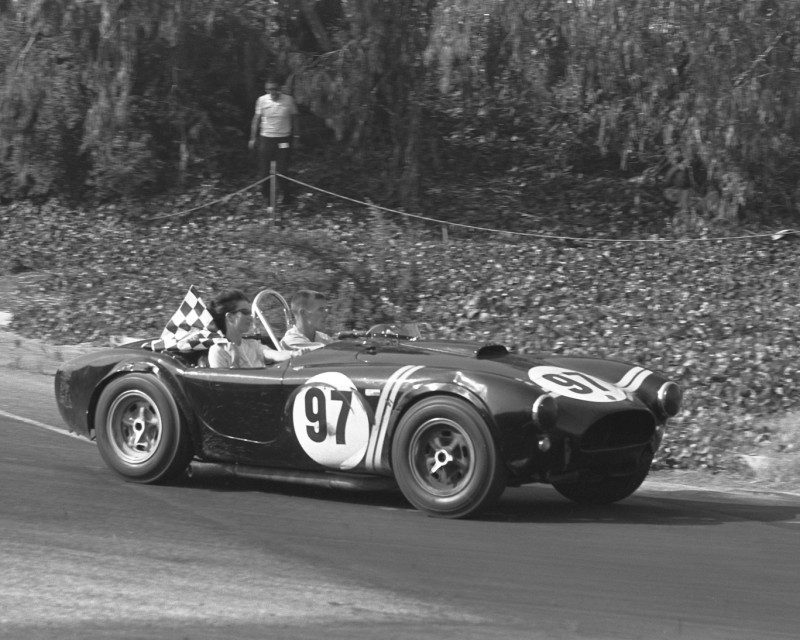
MacDonald takes wife Sherry on victory lap in Shelby Cobra CSX2128. Pomona July 1963

- In 1964, MacDonald was set to make his motion picture debut in the Universal Pictures film, The Lively Set. The movie starred James Darren, Pamela Tiffin and Doug McClure, and was billed as a racing adventure. MacDonald played himself in the movie while also performing driving duties for Darren's character, “Casey Owens”. Universal was in the final stages of editing when MacDonald was killed in the Indianapolis 500. Citing sensitivity concerns, the studio delayed the release by two months and removed MacDonald's character from final editing, leaving a cameo appearance. Mickey Thompson, Duane Carter (MacDonald's Indy teammates) and Billy Krause also had cameos.
- In 2005, the Augusta International Raceway Preservation Society (AIRPS), in conjunction with city officials and homebuilders, named the main road looping through the new Diamond Lakes housing development as Dave MacDonald Drive.
- In 2013, The Henry Ford created a Dave MacDonald photo set that is now archived in their image collection
- In 2014, MacDonald was inducted into the Corvette Hall of Fame
- In 2016, MacDonald was inducted into the United States Road Racing Championship Hall of Fame.
- In 2021, MacDonald was inducted in the West Coast Stock Car Hall of Fame.

== External sources ==
- Dave MacDonald Homepage
- Dave MacDonald – Cobra Man (2018) Phil Henny book
