= Jimmy Davies (racing driver) =

American racing driver (1929–1966)

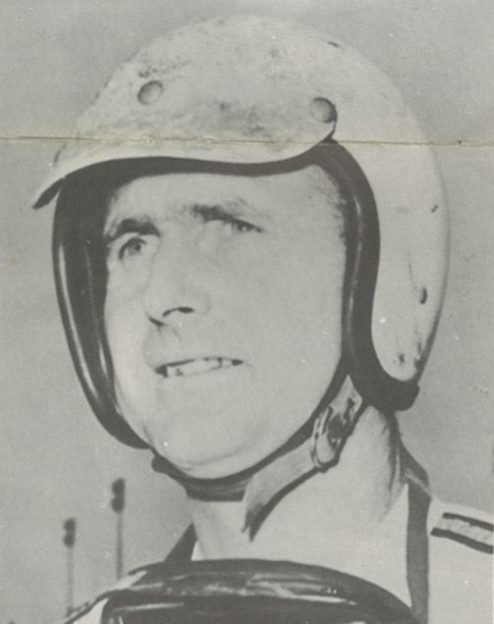
- Davies, circa 1963
- Born: James Richard Davies; August 8, 1929 Glendale, California, U.S.
- Died: June 11, 1966 (aged 36) Burr Ridge, Illinois, U.S.

Champ Car career
- 56 races run over 13 years
- Years active: 1949–1951, 1953–1961, 1963
- Best finish: 6th – 1955
- First race: 1949 Arlington 100 (Arlington)
- Last race: 1959 Bobby Ball Memorial (ASF)
- First win: 1949 Del Mar 100 (Del Mar)
- Last win: 1954 Springfield 100 (Springfield)
Wins	Podiums	Poles
3	9	2

Formula One World Championship career
- Active years: 1950–1951, 1953–1957, 1959
- Team(s): Kurtis Kraft, Pawl, Ewing
- Entries: 8 (5 starts)
- Championships: 0
- Wins: 0
- Podiums: 1
- Career points: 4
- Pole positions: 0
- Fastest laps: 0
- First entry: 1950 Indianapolis 500
- Last entry: 1959 Indianapolis 500

James Richard Davies (August 8, 1929 – June 11, 1966) was an American racecar driver in Champ cars and midgets. He was the second man to win three USAC National Midget Championships. When Davies won the 100-mile (160 km) AAA Championship race at Del Mar, California on November 6, 1949 – aged 20 years, 2 months, 29 days, he became the youngest driver to win a race in a major U.S. open wheel series, a record not broken until Marco Andretti won the IRL race at Sonoma, California in 2006. Davies raced AAA on a false birth certificate showing him older (as did Troy Ruttman and Jim Rathmann), and was racing illegally.

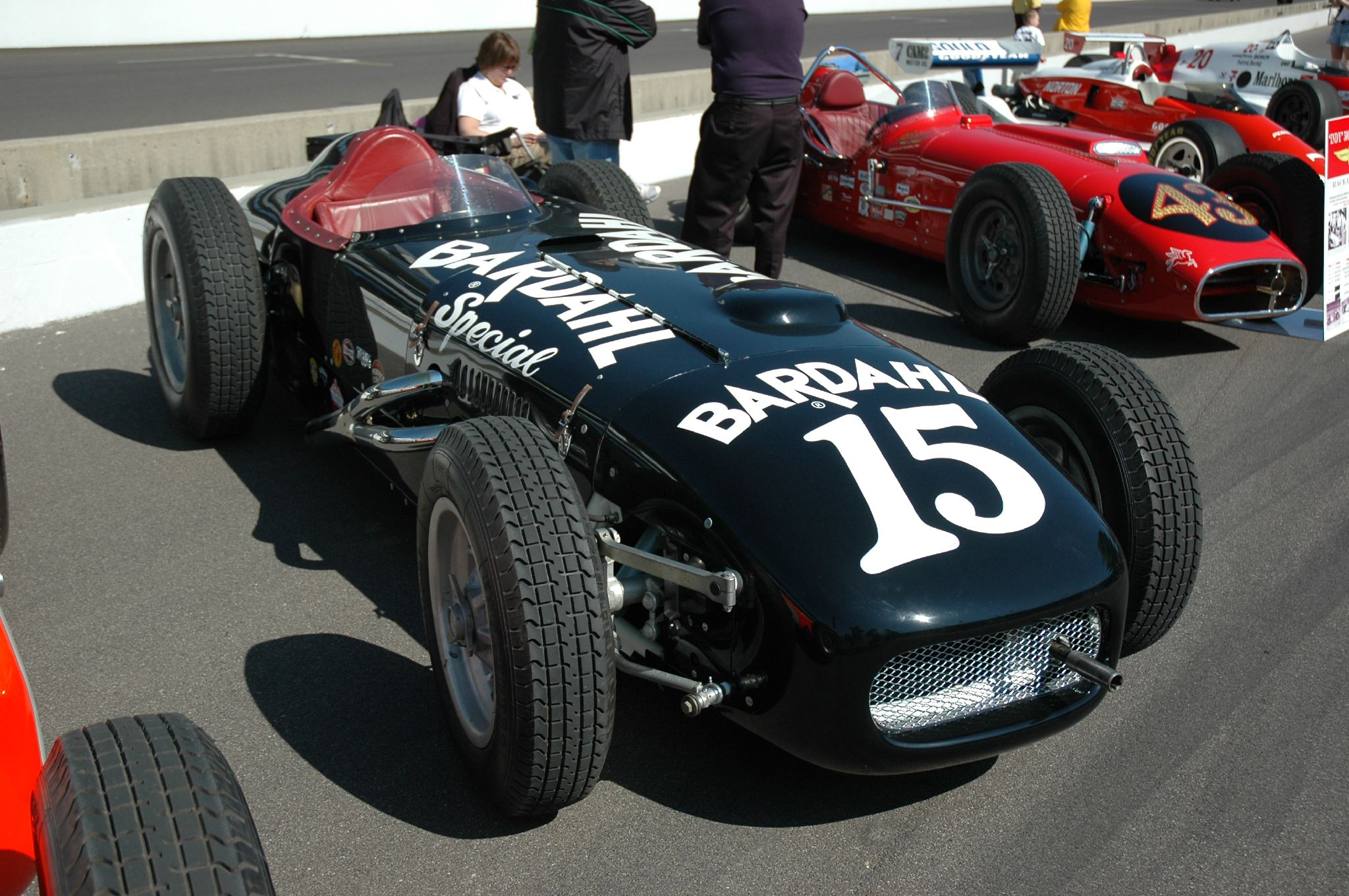
The Kurtis 500B driven by Davies to 3rd place in the 1955 Indianapolis 500

== Midget car career ==
In 1960, Davies won the USAC Pacific Coast Midget title as well as the National Midget Championship. He repeated as National Midget champion in 1961 and 1962. He won 46 feature events in the midgets in his career. Davies won the Night before the 500 midget race three times, in 1960 and 1961 at Kokomo Speedway, and next year at the Indianapolis Speedrome. Davies's midget car was stolen but was recovered a year later when a driver was killed in it at Sacramento. Davies recognized the car in the newspaper photos of the wreck.

Davies also had success racing midgets (called Speedcars down under) in Australia and New Zealand during his career. He won the 1963 Australian Speedcar Grand Prix at the Sydney Showground Speedway, as well as the 1963 and 1964 South Australian Speedcar Championships at the Rowley Park Speedway in Adelaide.

Davies died on June 11, 1966, aged 36, from injuries suffered in a midget crash at Santa Fe Speedway in suburban Chicago.

== Career award ==
- Inducted into the National Midget Auto Racing Hall of Fame in 1984.

== Complete AAA/USAC Championship Car results ==
Year	1	2	3	4	5	6	7	8	9	10	11	12	13	14	15	Pos	Points
1949	ARL; 10	INDY	MIL	TRE	SPR	MIL	DUQ	PIK	SYR; 8	DET; 6	SPR; 13	LAN; 16	SAC; DNQ	DMR; 1		17th	330
1950	INDY; 17	MIL; 3	LAN; 11	SPR; 10	MIL; 21	PIK	SYR; 15	DET; 2	SPR; 8	SAC; 15	PHX; 1	BAY; 14	DAR			12th	605.5
1951	INDY; 16	MIL; 14	LAN	DAR; 24	SPR; 18	MIL; 13	DUQ; 13	DUQ; 17	PIK	SYR	DET	DNC	SJS; 5	PHX; 3	BAY; 8	17th	315
1953	INDY; 10	MIL; 8	SPR	DET; 15	SPR; 16	MIL; 12	DUQ; 5	PIK	SYR; 16	ISF; DNS	SAC; 4	PHX; 7				12th	494,2
1954	INDY; DNS	MIL; 17	LAN	DAR; 28	SPR; 1	MIL; 23	DUQ; 4	PIK	SYR; 11	ISF; DNQ	SAC; 4	PHX; DNQ	LVG; 3			12th	614.5
1955	INDY; 3	MIL; 5	LAN; DNQ	SPR; 9	MIL; 13	DUQ; 14	PIK	SYR; 8	ISF; DNQ	SAC; DNQ	PHX; DNQ					6th	890
1956	INDY; DNQ	MIL	LAN	DAR	ATL	SPR	MIL	DUQ; 18	SYR	ISF; DNQ	SAC	PHX				-	0
1957	INDY; DNQ	LAN	MIL	DET	ATL	SPR	MIL	DUQ	SYR	ISF	TRE	SAC	PHX			-	0
1958	TRE	INDY	MIL	LAN	ATL	SPR	MIL; 20	DUQ; 15	SYR	ISF; DNQ	TRE; DNP	SAC	PHX			-	0
1959	DAY; 15	TRE; 3	INDY; DNQ	MIL	LAN; DNQ	SPR; DNQ	MIL	DUQ	SYR; DNQ	ISF	TRE; 15	SAC	PHX			32nd	140
1960	TRE	INDY	MIL; DNQ	LAN	SPR	MIL; DNQ	DUQ; DNQ	SYR	ISF; DNQ	TRE	SAC	PHX				-	0
1961	TRE	INDY	MIL	LAN	MIL	SPR	DUQ	SYR	ISF	TRE	SAC	PHX; DNQ				-	0
1963	TRE	INDY; DNQ	MIL; DNQ	LAN	TRE	SPR	MIL	DUQ	ISF; DNQ	TRE	SAC; DNQ	PHX; DNQ				-	0

== Indianapolis 500 results ==
Year	Car	Start	Qual	Rank	Finish	Laps	Led	Retired
1950	22	27	130.402	23	17	128	0	Flagged
1951	76	27	133.516	17	16	110	25	Rear end
1953	53	32	135.262	32	10	193	0	Flagged
1954	1	–	–	–	11*	?	?	Running
1955	15	10	140.274	5	3	200	0	Running
Totals						631	25	

Starts	5
Poles	0
Front Row	0
Wins	0
Top 5	1
Top 10	2
Retired	1

* Shared drive with Art Cross, Johnny Parsons, Sam Hanks and Andy Linden

== Complete Formula One World Championship results ==
(key)

Year	Entrant	Chassis	Engine	1	2	3	4	5	6	7	8	9	WDC	Points
1950	Pat Clancy	Ewing	Offenhauser L4	GBR	MON	500; 17	SUI	BEL	FRA	ITA			NC	0
1951	Parks Offenhauser / L.E. Parks	Pawl	Offenhauser L4	SUI	500; 16	BEL	FRA	GBR	GER	ITA	ESP		NC	0
1953	Pat Clancy	Kurtis Kraft 500B	Offenhauser L4	ARG	500; 10	NED	BEL	FRA	GBR	GER	SUI	ITA	NC	0
1954	Bardahl / Ed Walsh	Kurtis Kraft 4000	Offenhauser L4	ARG	500; 11	BEL	FRA	GBR	GER	SUI	ITA	ESP	NC	0
1955	Bardahl / Pat Clancy	Kurtis Kraft 500B	Offenhauser L4	ARG	MON	500; 3	BEL	NED	GBR	ITA			12th	4
1956	Novi Racing	Kurtis Kraft 500F	Novi V8	ARG	MON	500; DNQ	BEL	FRA	GBR	GER	ITA		NC	0
1957	Trio Brdeact Wind Allass	Kurtis Kraft 500D	Offenhauser L4	ARG	MON	500; DNQ	FRA	GBR	GER	PES	ITA		NC	0
1959	Sumar / Chapman Root	Kurtis Kraft 500G	Offenhauser L4	MON	500; DNQ	NED	FRA	GBR	GER	POR	ITA	USA	NC	0

- In 1954 Davies shared his drive with Art Cross, Johnny Parsons, Sam Hanks and Andy Linden. Davies also shared the 20th-placed car with Hanks and Jim Rathmann.
- Between 1950 and 1960, the Indianapolis 500 was included as part of the Formula One World Championship.

Records
Preceded by Johnnie Parsons; 31 years, 330 days (1950 Indianapolis 500)	Youngest race leader, for at least one lap in Formula One; 21 years, 285 days (1951 Indianapolis 500)	Succeeded by Fernando Alonso; 21 years, 237 days (2003 Malaysian GP)
