= Phoenix 100 =

American open-wheel race at Arizona State Fairgrounds

Bobby Ball Memorial
AAA National Championship
- Venue: Arizona State Fairgrounds (1915, 1950–1963)
- First IndyCar Series race: 1915
- Last race: 1963
- Distance: 100 mi (160 km)
- Laps: 100
- Previous names: Phoenix 100: 1950–1953
- Most wins (driver): Jimmy Bryan (3)
- Most wins (team): Dean Racing Enterprises (5)
- Most wins (manufacturer): Chassis: Kurtis Kraft (5); Engine: Offenhauser (14)

The Arizona State Fairgrounds played host to many races in American open-wheel racing during the AAA sanctioned era.

== Race history ==
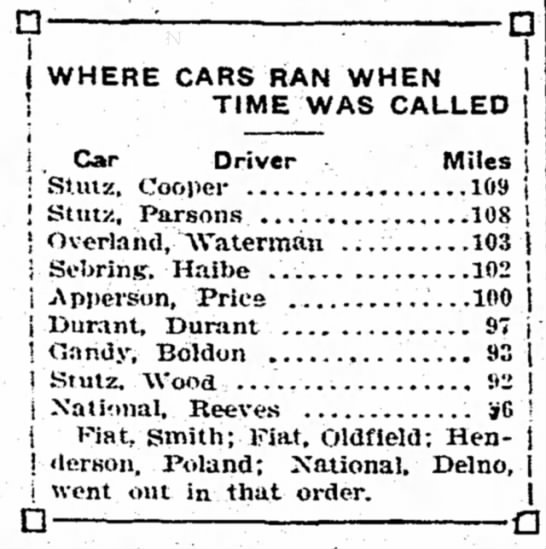
Finishing order of the 1915 race as published in The Arizona Republic

Open wheel racing in the Phoenix area dates back to 1915 on a dirt oval at the Arizona State Fairgrounds. Earl Cooper, who competed in the Indianapolis 500 seven times, won the inaugural race—scheduled for 150 laps of the one-mile track, it was ended after 109 miles due to darkness.

The race was revived in 1950 by the AAA, and then passed to the United States Auto Club (USAC) in 1956. USAC moved the race to the newly built Phoenix International Raceway in 1964. The race became a CART event in 1979. During the CART years, two races were scheduled through the mid-1980s, but the track dropped down to one race per year starting in 1987.

Starting in 1954, the race was named for driver Bobby Ball, who died in February 1954 following a racing accident in Los Angeles in January 1953. The race was renamed in 1972 due to sponsorship from Best Western. Bobby Ball naming returned for the 1976–1978 editions, the last of which was title sponsored by Miller High Life. Miller's sponsorship continued through the 1983 edition. The race then had three different title sponsors for its final three editions: Stroh's, Dana, and Circle K.

== Past winners ==
Season	Date	Race Name	Driver	Team	Chassis	Engine	Tire	Race Distance		Race Time	Average Speed (mph)
Season	Date	Race Name	Driver	Team	Chassis	Engine	Tire	Laps	Miles (km)	Race Time	Average Speed (mph)
AAA Championship Car history
1915	November 20		(United States) Earl Cooper	Stutz Motor Company	Stutz	Stutz	F	109	109 (175.418)	1:42:30	64.39
1916 – 1949	Not held										
1950	November 12	Phoenix 100	(United States) Jimmy Davies	Pat Clancy Racing	Ewing	Offenhauser	F	100	100 (160.934)	1:16:54	78.020
1951	November 4	Phoenix 100	(United States) Johnnie Parsons	Kurtis Kraft	Kurtis Kraft	Offenhauser	F	100	100 (160.934)	1:10:54	84.626
1952	November 11	Phoenix 100	(United States) Johnnie Parsons	Ricketts	Kurtis Kraft	Offenhauser	F	100	100 (160.934)	1:09:52	85.87
1953	November 11	Phoenix 100	(United States) Tony Bettenhausen	Belanger Motors	Kurtis Kraft	Offenhauser	F	100	100 (160.934)	1:11:30	83.916
1954	November 7−8*	Bobby Ball Memorial	(United States) Jimmy Bryan	Dean Racing Enterprises	Kuzma	Offenhauser	F	100	100 (160.934)	1:10:59	84.524
1955	November 6	Bobby Ball Memorial	(United States) Jimmy Bryan	Dean Racing Enterprises	Kuzma	Offenhauser	F	97*	97 (156.106)	1:09:24	83.862
USAC Championship Car history
1956	November 12	Bobby Ball Memorial	(United States) George Amick	Lindsey Hopkins Racing	Lesovsky	Offenhauser	F	100	100 (160.934)	1:05:20	91.826
1957	November 11	Bobby Ball Memorial	(United States) Jimmy Bryan	Dean Racing Enterprises	Kuzma	Offenhauser	F	100	100 (160.934)	1:09:46	86.001
1958	November 11	Bobby Ball Memorial	(United States) Jud Larson	Bignotti-Bowes Racing Associates	Lesovsky	Offenhauser	F	100	100 (160.934)	1:04:42	92.738
1959	October 18	Bobby Ball Memorial	(United States) Tony Bettenhausen	Lindsey Hopkins Racing	Kuzma	Offenhauser	F	100	100 (160.934)	1:07:50	88.458
1960	November 20	Bobby Ball Memorial	(United States) A. J. Foyt	Bignotti-Bowes Racing Associates	Meskowski	Offenhauser	F	100	100 (160.934)	1:07:21	89.079
1961	November 19	Bobby Ball Memorial	(United States) **Parnelli Jones**	Agajanian Racing	Lesovsky	Offenhauser	F	89*	89 (143.231)		
1962	November 18	Bobby Ball Memorial	(United States) **Bobby Marshman**	Lindsey Hopkins Racing	Kuzma	Offenhauser	F	51*	51 (82.076)	0:33:13	92.124
1963	November 17	Bobby Ball Memorial	(United States) Rodger Ward	Leader Card Racing	Watson	Offenhauser	F	100	100 (160.934)	1:10:35	85.01

- 1954: Final 65 laps completed on November 8 due to heavy dust and the rough condition of the track.
- 1955: Race shortened due to rough track conditions. Driver Jack McGrath was killed in an accident during this race.
- 1961: Race shortened due to darkness.
- 1962: Race shortened due to crash.
- **Bolded** driver indicates this was their first USAC Championship Car win

== Selected race summaries ==
- 1980: Johnny Rutherford led the first 37 laps, then on lap 71 was chasing leader Tom Sneva. Dicing through slower traffic, Rutherford slipped by Sneva in turn three to take the lead. He then suffered a spectacular crash. Coming out of turn four, he touched wheels with Dennis Firestone and spun into the outside wall. Then the car flipped up in the air and landed upside-down on its roll bar. Rutherford escaped with a concussion and only minor cuts and lacerations.
- 1985: In the second-to-last race of the season at Phoenix, Al Unser Sr. and Al Unser Jr. finished first-second, and ended the day within three points of each other going into the season finale. The father and son battle for the 1985 championship is famous in Indy car lore.
