= Art Bisch =

American racing driver (1926–1958)

- Born: Arthur James Bisch; November 10, 1926 Mesa, Arizona, U.S.
- Died: July 6, 1958 (aged 31) Atlanta, Georgia, U.S.

Champ Car career
- 8 races run over 3 years
- Years active: 1956–1958
- Best finish: 20th – 1957
- First race: 1956 Golden State 100 (Sacramento)
- Last race: 1958 Atlanta 100 (Lakewood)
- First win: 1958 Rex Mays Classic (Milwaukee)
Wins	Podiums	Poles
1	2	1

Formula One World Championship career
- Active years: 1958
- Team: Kuzma
- Entries: 1
- Championships: 0
- Wins: 0
- Podiums: 0
- Career points: 0
- Pole positions: 0
- Fastest laps: 0
- First entry: 1958 Indianapolis 500

Arthur James Bisch Sr (November 10, 1926 – July 6, 1958) was an American racecar driver. Bisch died two days after sustaining head and chest injuries when his Champ Car smashed into the guardrail and rolled over twice at Lakewood Speedway in July 1958. A month earlier, he had captured his first Champ Car win at the Milwaukee Mile.

== Complete USAC Championship Car results ==
Year	1	2	3	4	5	6	7	8	9	10	11	12	13	Pos	Points
1956	INDY	MIL	LAN	DAR	ATL	SPR	MIL	DUQ	SYR	ISF	SAC; 17	PHX; 10		33rd	30
1957	INDY	LAN; 3	MIL; 20	DET	ATL	SPR	MIL; DNQ	DUQ	SYR	ISF	TRE	SAC; DNQ	PHX; 4	20th	260
1958	TRE	INDY; 33	MIL; 1	LAN; DNQ	ATL; 16	SPR	MIL	DUQ	SYR	ISF	TRE	SAC	PHX	23rd	200

== Indianapolis 500 results ==
Year	Car	Start	Qual	Rank	Finish	Laps	Led	Retired
1958	57	28	142.631	28	33	0	0	Crash T3
Totals						0	0	

Starts	1
Poles	0
Front Row	0
Wins	0
Top 5	0
Top 10	0
Retired	1

== Complete Formula One World Championship results ==
(key)

Year	Entrant	Chassis	Engine	1	2	3	4	5	6	7	8	9	10	11	WDC	Points
1958	Helse / H.H. Johnson	Kuzma Indy Roadster	Offenhauser L4	ARG	MON	NED	500; 33	BEL	FRA	GBR	GER	POR	ITA	MOR	NC	0
