= Johnnie Parsons =

American racing driver (1918–1984)

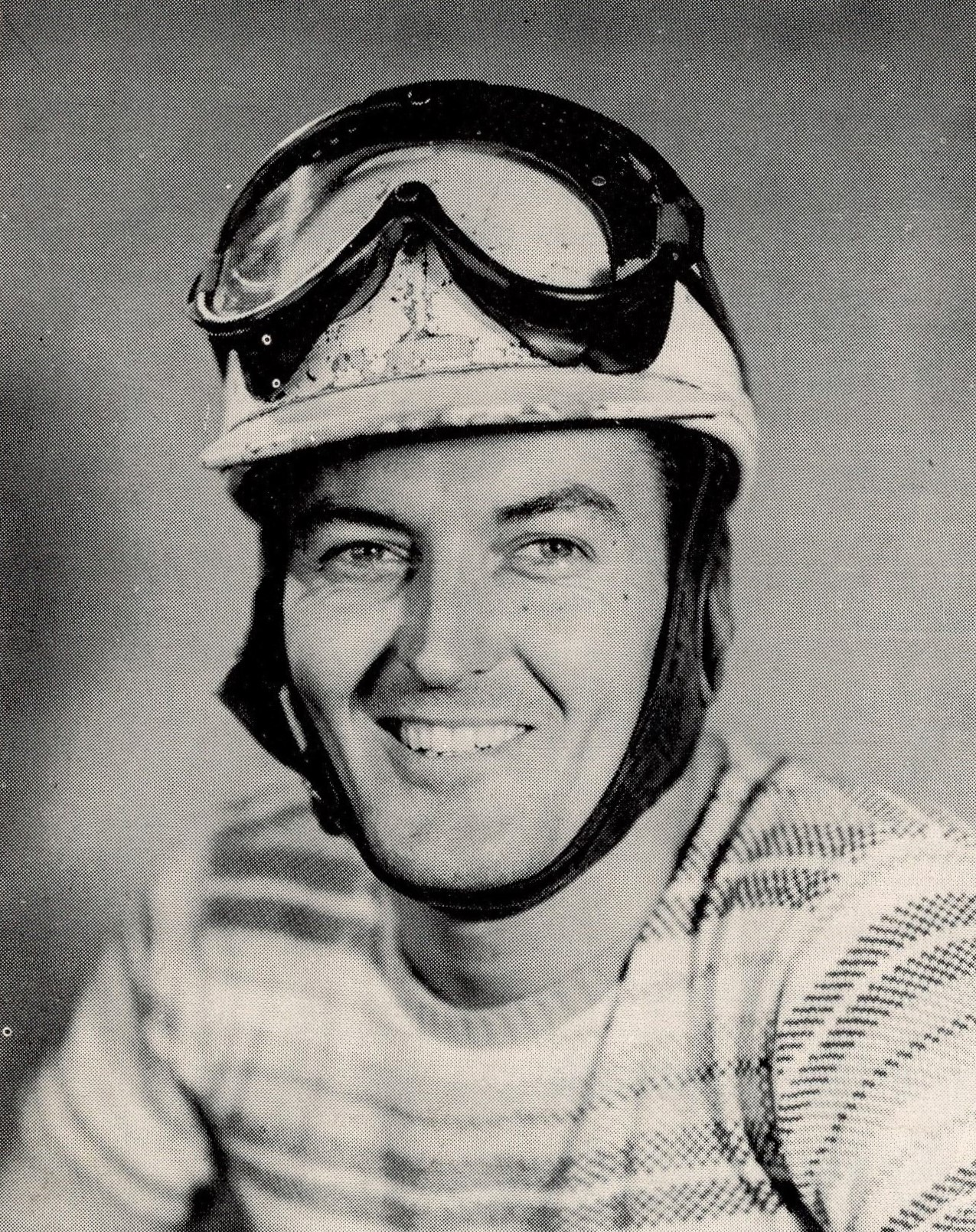
- Parsons, circa 1957
- Born: John Woodrow Parsons; July 4, 1918 Los Angeles, California, U.S.
- Died: September 8, 1984 (aged 66) Los Angeles, California, U.S.

Championship titles
- AAA Midwest Midget Car (1948); AAA Championship Car (1949); USAC Pacific Coast Midget Car (1956); Major victories Indianapolis 500 (1950)

Champ Car career
- 61 races run over 11 years
- Best finish: 1st (1949)
- First race: 1948 Springfield 100 (Springfield)
- Last race: 1958 Indianapolis 500 (Indianapolis)
- First win: 1948 DuQuoin 100 (DuQuoin)
- Last win: 1952 Phoenix 100 (Phoenix)
Wins	Podiums	Poles
11	20	1

Formula One World Championship career
- Active years: 1950 – 1958
- Team(s): Kurtis Kraft, Kuzma
- Entries: 9
- Championships: 0
- Wins: 1
- Podiums: 1
- Career points: 12
- Pole positions: 0
- Fastest laps: 1
- First entry: 1950 Indianapolis 500
- First win: 1950 Indianapolis 500
- Last entry: 1958 Indianapolis 500

John Woodrow Parsons (July 4, 1918 – September 8, 1984) was an American racing driver in the AAA and USAC Championship Car series. He was the 1949 AAA national champion, and won the 1950 Indianapolis 500.

Parsons was known as a "charger" - needing others to compete against in order to bring out the best in him as a driver - frequently moving from near the back of the grid to the front in spectacular displays of driving ability. He drove for several seasons on a team owned by Frank Kurtis, owner of Kurtis Kraft, the leading constructor of AAA Championship cars during the early 1950s.

== Early life ==
Parsons was born in Los Angeles, California, to Harmon and Belle Parsons, who both made their living in show business. By the age of three, Parsons was a participant in his family's song-and-dance act, working vaudeville theaters of the Orpheum Circuit. During these experiences Parsons developed a knack for showmanship that helped him become a fan favorite during his racing career. Parsons' parents separated in the mid-1920s, after which he went to live with his uncle, Jack Bridges, who owned a garage in Los Angeles.

Among those who leased space from Bridges included local legend dirt track driver Fred Lecklider, rising star Frank Lockhart, and Ralph DePalma, winner of the 1915 Indianapolis 500. Exposure to these drivers coupled with the experiences attending his first races at the Legion Ascot Speedway during the late 1920s inspired Parsons to aspire to a driving career for himself. As a teenager, he sold programs during midget races in the grandstands of venues such as Gilmore Stadium.

Parsons was heavily influenced by drivers such as Bob Swanson - a two-time winner of the Turkey Night Grand Prix - who were also skilled mechanics. Parsons, determined to emulate the career of Swanson, learned to weld and work on cars, becoming multi-talented within the sport. During junior high school he began working for some of the local drivers who had cars stored at his uncle's garage. By the time of his graduation from Polytechnic High School, he had worked for drivers such as Curly Wetteroth and Kelly Petillo. He was then hired by an engineering firm in Glendale, where he did design layouts and worked as a welder.

== Driving career ==
=== Midget and Sprint car career ===
Parsons' open-wheel racing career began in 1940, competing in a midget race at Atlantic Boulevard Speedway in Los Angeles. Later that year, he scored his first victory at a race held in Colton, California. Around this time he began competing in semi-professional, United Midget Association (UMA) sanctioned midget races on the U.S West Coast. In 1942, Parsons won the UMA championship, winning 18 races during the season, which was interrupted by the Second World War. During the war, Parsons worked for the Douglas Aircraft Company.

Post-war, Parsons resumed racing in UMA sanctioned events throughout California. He also turned professional, in one week racing as often as five nights, and twice during Sundays. In 1947, Parsons raced out of state for the first time, relocating to the Midwest, where he competed in AAA-sanctioned events held throughout the United States. In 1948, Parsons claimed the AAA Midwest Midget championship, a year during which he won the prestigious third feature of the Night Before the 500 triple-header held at the 16th Street Speedway - located across from the Indianapolis Motor Speedway. His successes during this year earned Parsons Championship Car opportunities.

Parsons continued racing midgets during his Championship car career. He won the 1955 Turkey Night Grand Prix midget car race, and also began racing sprint cars. In 1951, he finished third in the AAA Eastern Sprint Car championship.

=== Championship car career ===
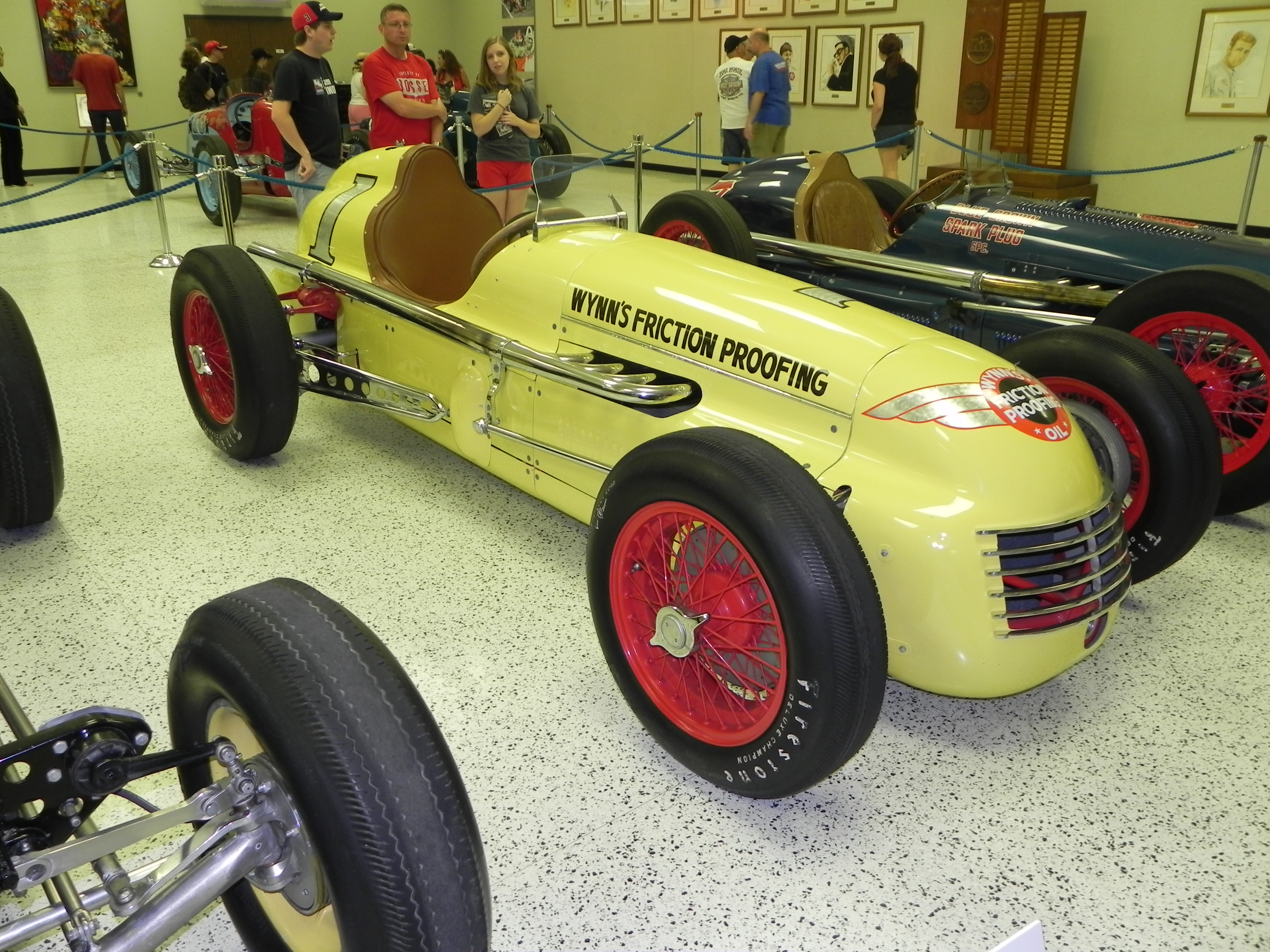
Parsons' winning car from the 1950 Indianapolis 500

Parsons began racing in the AAA after World War II. Parsons finished second in his first Indy 500 in 1949. He won the season championship that season. He also won the 1950 Indianapolis 500.

After he retired, Parsons became the Chief Steward for the USAC Midget division on the West Coast in the 1970s.

=== World Drivers' Championship career ===
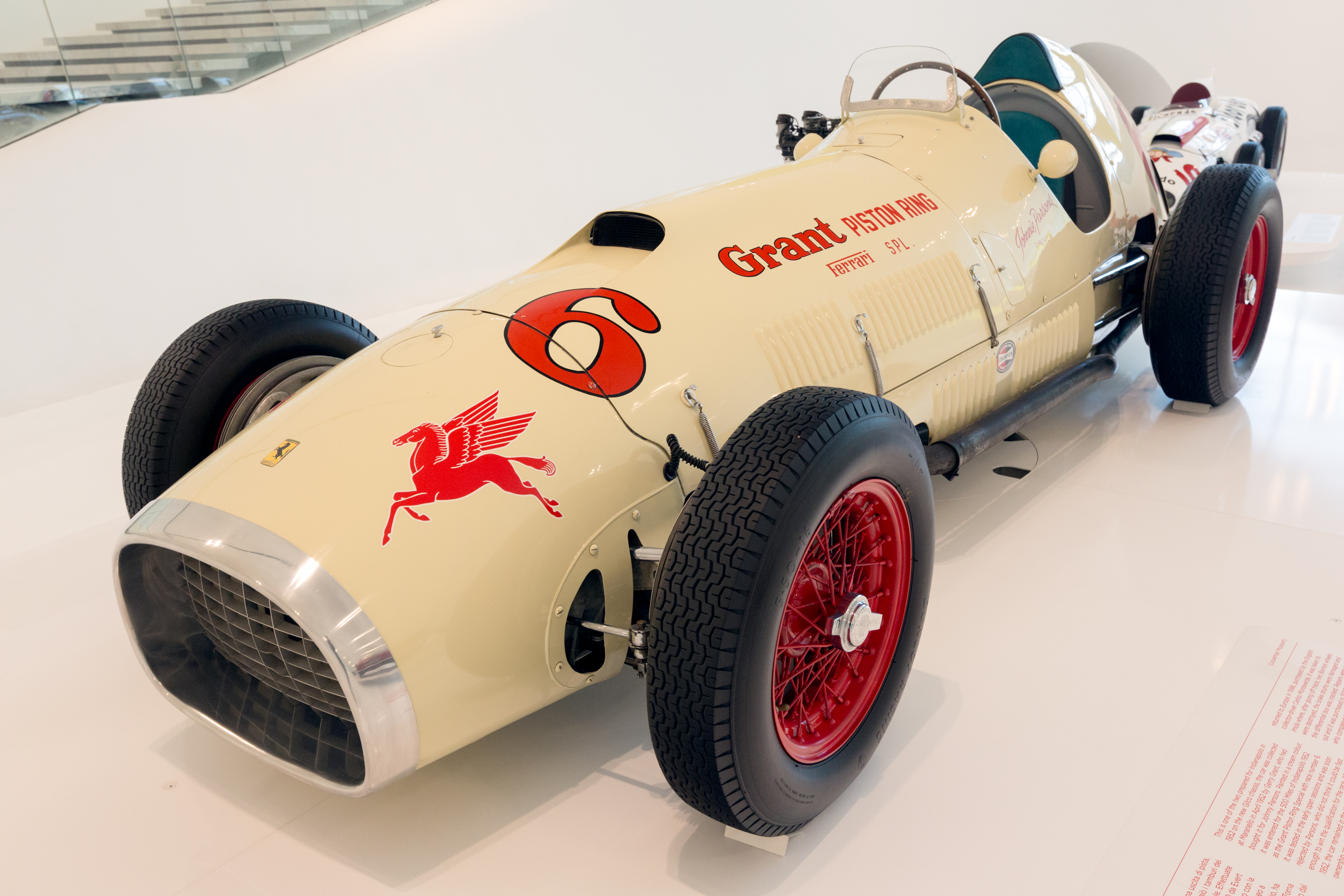
Parsons intended to drive this Ferrari 375 Indianapolis in the 1952 Indianapolis 500 - he later elected to race the Kurtis Kraft in which he had driven the 1949 and 1950 events

The AAA/USAC-sanctioned Indianapolis 500 was included in the FIA World Drivers' Championship from 1950 through 1960. Drivers competing at Indianapolis during those years were credited with World Drivers' Championship points and participation in addition to those which they received towards the AAA/USAC National Championship.

Parsons participated in nine World Drivers' Championship races at Indianapolis. He won once, recorded one fastest lap, and accumulated 12 World Drivers' Championship points.

Parsons is one of only three drivers to win on their World Drivers' Championship début. The other two are Nino Farina, who won the inaugural World Championship race – the 1950 British Grand Prix, 17 days earlier – and Giancarlo Baghetti, who won the 1961 French Grand Prix.

== Personal life ==
Around 1942, Parsons met and married his first wife, Arza. Together they had two children; a son, John Wayne Parsons, and a daughter, Joan. John, commonly referred to as "Johnny Parsons, Jr.," would grow up to also become a race car driver. Parsons, Sr. and Arza separated around 1947. Arza would later marry Duane Carter, having a son, Duane, Jr. - commonly known as "Pancho" - who coincidentally also grew up to be a race car driver.

In 1947, Parsons married his second wife, Lila, together having a daughter, named Patricia.

Parsons died of a heart attack on September 8, 1984, at his home in Van Nuys, California, aged 66.

== Borg-Warner Trophy ==
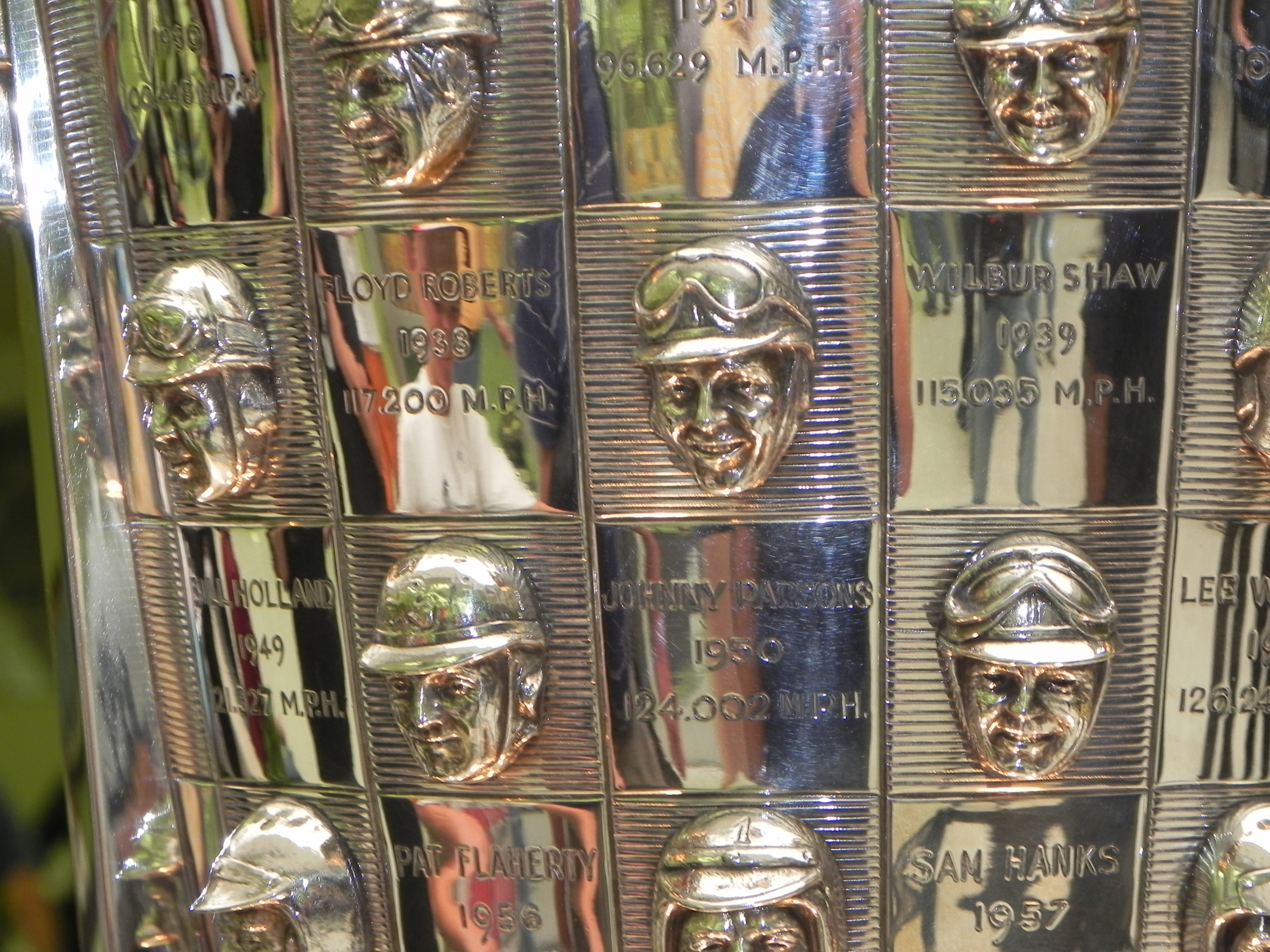
Parsons' misengraved name on the Borg-Warner Trophy

Parsons has the dubious distinction of being the only Indianapolis 500 winner to have his name misspelled on the Borg-Warner Trophy. The silversmith engraved "Johnny" instead of "Johnnie." He had a son named Johnny who competed at Indy a dozen times. Evidence of the engraver's mistake can be seen in MGM’s production, To Please a Lady (1950). When the camera pans across Johnnie Parsons' name and bust relief, while they’re doing a brief segment on the trophy, his misspelled name is revealed. In 1991, during a trophy restoration project, it was proposed to correct the spelling, albeit posthumously. However, it was decided to keep the error intact, as part of the trophy's lore.

== Awards and honors ==
Parsons has been inducted into the following halls of fame:

- National Midget Auto Racing Hall of Fame (1984)
- Auto Racing Hall of Fame (1986)
- Motorsports Hall of Fame of America (2004)
- National Sprint Car Hall of Fame (2008)

== Motorsports career results ==
=== AAA/USAC Championship Car results ===
Year	1	2	3	4	5	6	7	8	9	10	11	12	13	14	15	Pos	Points
1948	ARL	INDY; DNQ	MIL	LAN	MIL	SPR; 2	MIL; 2	DUQ; 11	ATL	PIK	SPR; 13	DUQ; 1				11th	700
1949	ARL; 1	INDY; 2	MIL; 13	TRE; 11	SPR; 3	MIL; 1	DUQ; 11	PIK	SYR; 1	DET; 12	SPR; 1	LAN; 1	SAC; 5	DMR; 15		1st	2,280
1950	INDY; 1	MIL; 11	LAN; DNS	SPR; DNQ	MIL; DNS	PIK	SYR; DNQ	DET; 16	SPR; DNQ	SAC; 11	PHX; 3	BAY; DNQ	DAR; 1			3rd	1,313
1951	INDY; 21	MIL; DNQ	LAN; DNS	DAR; 23	SPR	MIL; 3	DUQ; 2	DUQ; 16	PIK	SYR; 17	DET	DNC; 14	SJS; 7	PHX; 1	BAY; 1	6th	1,012
1952	INDY; 10	MIL; DNQ	RAL; 22	SPR; DNQ	MIL	DET	DUQ	PIK	SYR	DNC	SJS; 16	PHX; 1				18th	350
1953	INDY; 26	MIL	SPR; DNQ	DET; 8	SPR; 4	MIL; 21	DUQ; 3	PIK	SYR; 12	ISF; 3	SAC; 15	PHX; 16				13th	435.5
1954	INDY; 32	MIL; 16	LAN	DAR; 30	SPR; DNQ	MIL	DUQ; 7	PIK	SYR; 8	ISF; 16	SAC; DNQ	PHX; DNQ	LVG; DNQ			33rd	122.5
1955	INDY; 21	MIL	LAN	SPR	MIL; 9	DUQ; DNQ	PIK	SYR; DNQ	ISF	SAC	PHX					39th	53.2
1956	INDY; 4	MIL; 17	LAN	DAR	ATL	SPR	MIL; 11	DUQ; DNQ	SYR; DNP	ISF	SAC; DNQ	PHX				13th	650
1957	INDY; 16	LAN	MIL	DET	ATL	SPR	MIL; 7	DUQ	SYR	ISF	TRE	SAC	PHX			27th	120
1958	TRE	INDY; 12	MIL; Wth	LAN	ATL	SPR	MIL	DUQ	SYR	ISF	TRE	SAC	PHX			34th	50
1959	DAY	TRE	INDY; DNP	MIL	LAN	SPR	MIL	DUQ	SYR	ISF	TRE	SAC	PHX			-	0

=== Indianapolis 500 results ===
Year	Car	Start	Qual	Rank	Finish	Laps	Led	Retired
1949	12	12	132.900	2	2nd	200	0	Running
1950	1	5	132.044	8	1st	138	115	Running
1951	3	8	132.154	28	21	87	0	Magneto
1952	5	31	135.328	19	10	200	0	Running
1953	21	8	137.667	3	26	86	0	Crankshaft
1954	15	15	139.578	6	32	79	0	Stalled in pits
1955	16	27	136.809	27	21	119	0	Magneto
1956	98	6	144.144	7	4	200	16	Running
1957*	18	17	140.784	21	16	195	0	Flagged
1958	45	6	144.683	6	12	200	0	Running
Totals						1504	131	

Starts	10
Poles	0
Front Row	0
Wins	1
Top 5	3
Top 10	4
Retired	4

- Parsons initially failed to qualify for the 1957 Indianapolis 500. However, Dick Rathmann (who had qualified) was mugged the day before the race and therefore deemed unable to drive. Parsons was selected as replacement driver for the car and allowed to start from the position Dick Rathmann had qualified the car at (in later years such a driver change would see the car in question moved to the rear of the field).

=== FIA World Drivers' Championship results ===
(key) (Races in italics indicate fastest lap)

Year	Entrant	Chassis	Engine	1	2	3	4	5	6	7	8	9	10	11	WDC	Points
1950	Wynn's Friction / Kurtis-Kraft	Kurtis Kraft 1000	Offenhauser L4	GBR	MON	500; 1	SUI	BEL	FRA	ITA					6th	9
1951	Wynn's Friction Proofing / Walsh	Kurtis Kraft 3000	Offenhauser L4	SUI	500; Ret	BEL	FRA	GBR	GER	ITA	ESP				NC	0
1952	Jim Robbins	Kurtis Kraft 1000	Offenhauser L4	SUI	500; 10	BEL	FRA	GBR	GER	NED	ITA				NC	0
1953	Belond Equa-Flow	Kurtis Kraft 500B	Offenhauser L4	ARG	500; Ret	NED	BEL	FRA	GBR	GER	SUI	ITA			NC	0
1954	Belond Equa-Flow / Calif. Muffler	Kurtis Kraft 500C	Offenhauser L4	ARG	500; Ret	BEL	FRA	GBR	GER	SUI	ITA	ESP			NC	0
1955	Trio Brass Foundry / Anderson	Kurtis Kraft 500C	Offenhauser L4	ARG	MON	500; Ret	BEL	NED	GBR	ITA					NC	0
1956	J.C. Agajanian	Kuzma Indy Roadster	Offenhauser L4	ARG	MON	500; 4	BEL	FRA	GBR	GER	ITA				18th	3
1957	Sumar/Chapman Root	Kurtis Kraft 500G	Offenhauser L4	ARG	MON	500; 16	FRA	GBR	GER	PES	ITA				NC	0
1958	Fred Gerhardt	Kurtis Kraft 500G	Offenhauser L4	ARG	MON	NED	500; 12	BEL	FRA	GBR	GER	POR	ITA	MOR	NC	0

Awards
Preceded by Bill Holland	Indianapolis 500 winner 1950	Succeeded by Lee Wallard
Records
Preceded by Juan Manuel Fangio; 38 years, 331 days (1950 Monaco GP)	Youngest Grand Prix race winner 31 years, 330 days (1950 Indianapolis 500)	Succeeded by José Froilán González; 28 years, 282 days (1951 British GP)
Preceded by Juan Manuel Fangio; 38 years, 331 days (1950 Monaco GP)	Youngest driver to set fastest lap in Formula One; 31 years, 330 days (1950 Indianapolis 500)	Succeeded by José Froilán González; 29 years, 338 days (1952 Italian GP)
Preceded by Juan Manuel Fangio; 38 years, 323 days (1950 British GP)	Youngest race leader, for at least one lap in Formula One; 31 years, 330 days (1950 Indianapolis 500)	Succeeded by Jimmy Davies; 21 years, 285 days (1951 Indianapolis 500)
