= Tony Bettenhausen =

American racing driver (1916–1961)

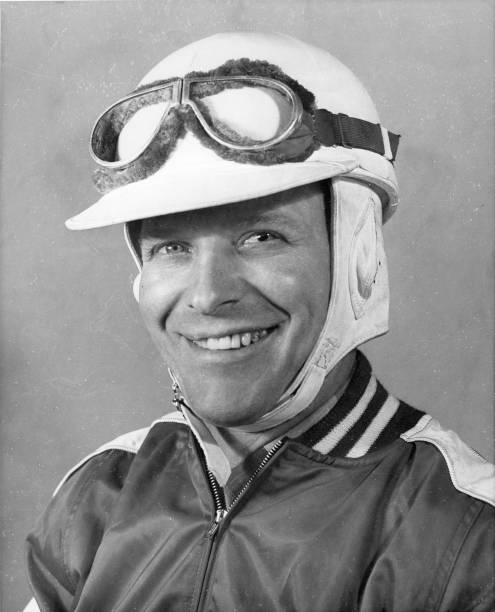
- Bettenhausen, circa 1951
- Born: Melvin Eugene Bettenhausen; September 12, 1916 Tinley Park, Illinois, U.S.
- Died: May 12, 1961 (aged 44) Speedway, Indiana, U.S.

Championship titles
- AAA / USAC Championship Car (1951, 1958)

Champ Car career
- 118 races run over 17 years
- Best finish: 1st (1951, 1958)
- First race: 1941 Milwaukee 100 (Milwaukee)
- Last race: 1961 Trenton 100 (Trenton)
- First win: 1946 George Robson Memorial (Goshen)
- Last win: 1959 Bobby Ball Memorial (Phoenix)
Wins	Podiums	Poles
22	40	13

Formula One World Championship career
- Active years: 1950–1960
- Team(s): Kurtis Kraft, Diedt, Kuzma, Epperly, Watson
- Entries: 11
- Championships: 0
- Wins: 0
- Podiums: 1
- Career points: 11
- Pole positions: 0
- Fastest laps: 1
- First entry: 1950 Indianapolis 500
- Last entry: 1960 Indianapolis 500

Melvin Eugene "Tony" Bettenhausen (September 12, 1916 – May 12, 1961) was an American racing driver known primarily for his open-wheel career. He twice won the National Championship, doing so in 1951 and 1958. He also competed in stock cars, winning under AAA and USAC sanction.

Bettenhausen was nicknamed the "Tinley Park Express" in honor of his hometown. He was nicknamed "Tunney" after heavyweight boxing champion Gene Tunney. "Tunney" later became "Tony."

== Racing career ==
=== Midget car career ===
Bettenhausen was part of the midget car "Chicago Gang" with Emil Andres, Cowboy O'Rourke, Paul Russo, Jimmy Snyder, and Wally Zale. These racers toured tracks in the Midwest and East Coast of the United States.

Bettenhausen won the track championship at the Milwaukee Mile in 1942, 1946, and 1947. He was the Chicago Raceway Park champion in 1941, 1942, and 1947.

In October 1950, Bettenhausen was involved in a race in Sacramento, California, when his car locked wheels with another racer's car, causing a crash through the guard rail, resulting in fatal injuries to spectator Peter Bernard Stuberak, and injuries to two other spectators.

Bettenhausen won the 1959 Turkey Night Grand Prix, and the Hut Hundred in 1955 and 1956.

=== Championship car career ===
Bettenhausen drove in the AAA and USAC Championship Car series, racing in the 1941 and 1946-1961 seasons with 121 starts, including 14 in the Indianapolis 500. He finished in the top ten 74 times, with 21 victories.

Bettenhausen won the National Championship in 1951 after recording eight victories and two second-place finishes in fourteen events. He announced his retirement from all racing but the Indianapolis 500 after the season. He decided to return full-time for the 1954 season. He was involved in a midget car wreck in Chicago, suffering head injuries after striking a concrete wall. He was in critical condition for several days.

Bettenhausen prearranged to co-drive with Chicago Gang friend Paul Russo in the 1955 Indianapolis 500. They finished second.

In 1958, Bettenhausen became the first driver to claim the National Championship without a win. He was assured the title with a second-place finish at Phoenix. He finished second in the national championship to Rodger Ward in 1959.

=== World Drivers' Championship career ===
The AAA/USAC-sanctioned Indianapolis 500 was included in the FIA World Drivers' Championship from 1950 through 1960. Drivers competing at Indianapolis during those years were credited with World Drivers' Championship participation, and were eligible to score WDC points alongside those which they may have scored towards the AAA/USAC National Championship.

Bettenhausen participated in all 11 World Drivers' Championship races held at Indianapolis. He finished in the top-three once, and set one fastest leader lap. He scored 11 World Drivers' Championship points.

== Death ==
Bettenhausen was killed in a May 12, 1961 crash at Indianapolis while testing a Stearly Motor Freight Special vehicle for Paul Russo. The car smashed into the outside wall of the track and then rolled 325 feet (99 m) along the barrier. The car came to rest in a grassy plot between the wall and Grandstand A, with the tail of the car on fire. Results showed the accident was caused by an anchor bolt which fell off the front radius rod support, allowing the front axle to twist and misalign the front wheels when the brakes were applied, which drove the car into the wall. Bettenhausen died instantly. He was buried at Crown Hill Cemetery and Arboretum, Section 58, Lot 110, 39.8223808°N 86.1654235°W

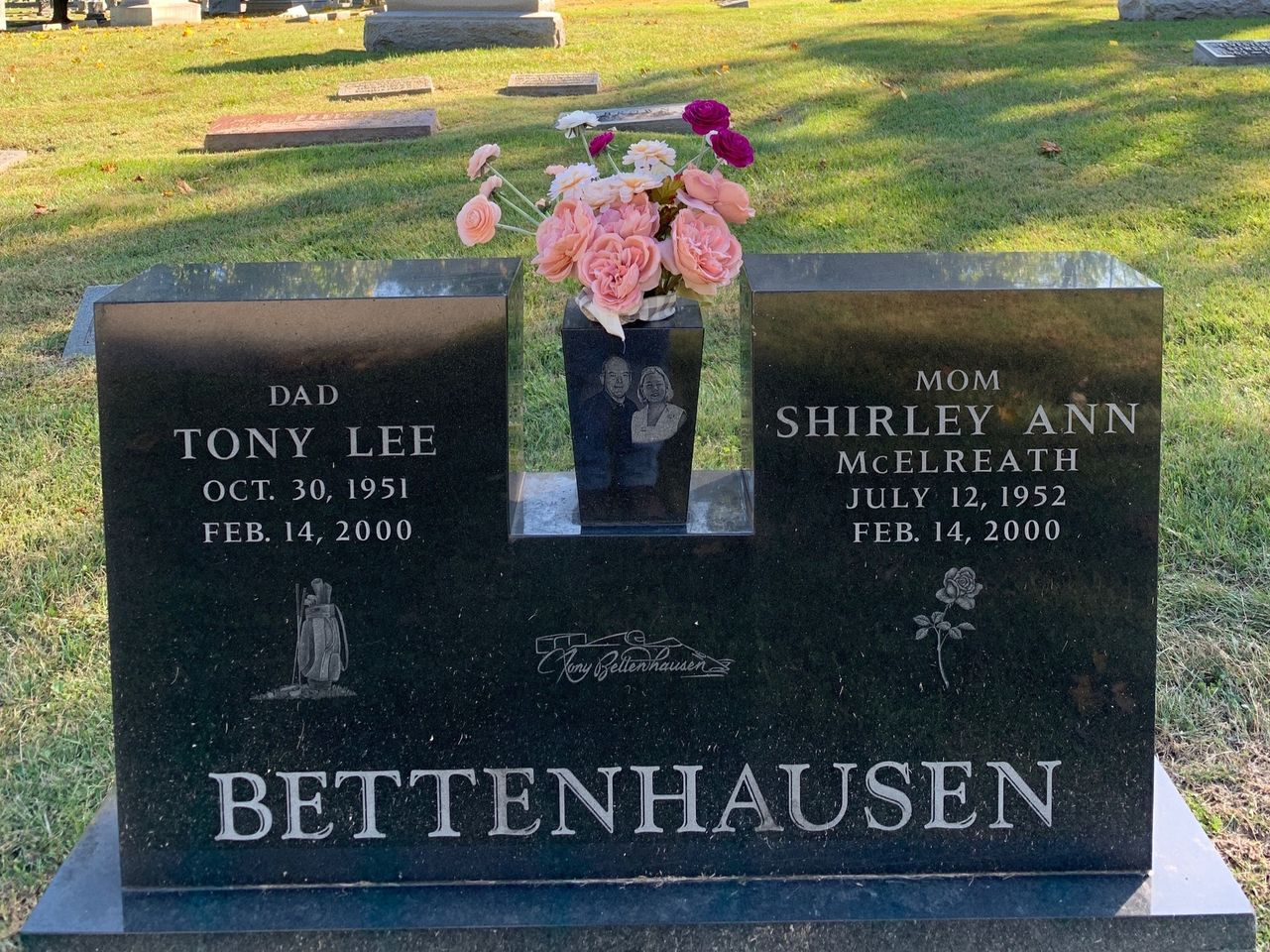
Photo of a grave at Crown Hill Cemetery provided to Wikimedia Commons by Crown Hill Foundation.

== Personal life and family ==
Bettenhausen was the father of Gary Bettenhausen, Tony Bettenhausen Jr. and Merle Bettenhausen. Gary Bettenhausen and Tony Bettenhausen Jr. both raced in the Indianapolis 500 numerous times.

== Awards and honors ==
Bettenhausen has been inducted into the following halls of fame:

- Auto Racing Hall of Fame (1968)
- National Midget Auto Racing Hall of Fame (1985)
- International Motorsports Hall of Fame (1991)
- Motorsports Hall of Fame of America (1997)
- National Sprint Car Hall of Fame (2008)
- United States Auto Club (USAC) Hall of Fame (2013)

== Motorsports career results ==
=== AAA/USAC Championship Car results ===
Year	1	2	3	4	5	6	7	8	9	10	11	12	13	14	15	Pos	Points
1946	INDY; 20	LAN; DNP	ATL	ISF; 5	MIL; 9	GOS; 1										14th	340
1947	INDY; 18	MIL; 15	LAN; 10	ATL; DNQ	BAI; 4	MIL; 11	GOS; 1	MIL; 4	PIK	SPR; 1	ARL; 10					6th	686.8
1948	ARL	INDY; 14	MIL; 15	LAN; 15	MIL; 6	SPR; 6	MIL; 1†	DUQ; 10	ATL	PIK	SPR	DUQ				15th	324
1949	ARL	INDY; DNQ	MIL; DNQ	TRE	SPR; 18	MIL; 15	DUQ; 1	PIK	SYR; 9	DET; 1	SPR; 9	LAN	SAC; DNQ	DMR; 16		12th	466
1950	INDY; 31	MIL; 1	LAN; 14	SPR; 11	MIL; 18	PIK	SYR; 12	DET; 10	SPR; 1	SAC; 17	PHX; 2	BAY; 1	DAR; 20			5th	1,027.5
1951	INDY; 9	MIL; 1	LAN; 1	DAR; 2	SPR; 1	MIL; 10	DUQ; 1	DUQ; 1	PIK	SYR; 1	DET; 4	DNC; 1	SJS; 1	PHX; 13	BAY; 2	1st	2,556
1952	INDY; 24	MIL; DNQ	RAL	SPR	MIL	DET	DUQ	PIK	SYR	DNC	SJS	PHX				-	0
1953	INDY; 9	MIL	SPR	DET	SPR	MIL; DNS	DUQ; 18	PIK	SYR; 1	ISF; 6	SAC	PHX; 1				10th	596
1954	INDY; 29	MIL; DNQ	LAN	DAR	SPR	MIL	DUQ	PIK	SYR	ISF	SAC	PHX; 16	LVG; 17			-	0
1955	INDY; 2	MIL; DNQ	LAN	SPR; DNQ	MIL; 2	DUQ; DNQ	PIK	SYR; Wth	ISF; 4	SAC	PHX; 9					4th	1,060
1956	INDY; 22	MIL	LAN	DAR	ATL	SPR; DNS	MIL; DNS	DUQ; 8	SYR; 1	ISF; 18	SAC; 14	PHX; 9				24th	290
1957	INDY; 15	LAN	MIL; DNQ	DET	ATL	SPR	MIL; 21	DUQ; 15	SYR; DNQ	ISF; 11	TRE; 7	SAC; 18	PHX			29th	80
1958	TRE; 2	INDY; 4	MIL; 2	LAN; 5	ATL; 18	SPR; 12	MIL; 25	DUQ; 2	SYR; 3	ISF; 5	TRE; 3	SAC; 5	PHX; 2			1st	1,830
1959	DAY; 18	TRE; 1	INDY; 4	MIL; 17	LAN; 17	SPR; 17	MIL; 16	DUQ; 3	SYR; 6	ISF; 15	TRE; 2	SAC; 1	PHX; 8			2nd	1,430
1960	TRE; 2	INDY; 23	MIL; 4	LAN; DNQ	SPR; 15	MIL; 14	DUQ; 2	SYR; 2	ISF; 2	TRE; 6	SAC; 5	PHX; 16				5th	940
1961	TRE; 19	INDY; DNQ	MIL	LAN	MIL	SPR	DUQ	SYR	ISF	TRE	SAC	PHX				-	0

- 1946 table only includes results of the six races run to "championship car" specifications. Points total includes the 71 races run to "big car" specifications.

† Shared drive with Myron Fohr

=== Indianapolis 500 results ===
Year	Car	Start	Qual	Rank	Finish	Laps	Led	Retired
1946	42	26	123.094	13	20	47	0	Rod
1947	29	25	120.980	17	18	79	0	Timing gear
1948	6	22	126.396	10	14	167	0	Clutch
1950	14	8	130.947	16	31	30	0	Wheel bearing
1951	5	9	131.950	30	9	178	0	Spun T4
1952	27	30	135.384	17	24	93	0	Stalled
1953	98	6	136.024	20	9	196	0	Crash T3
1954	10	21	138.275	19	29	105	0	Bearing
1955	10	2	139.985	13	2nd	200	0	Running
1956	99	5	144.602	5	22	160	0	Crash T1
1957	27	22	142.439	9	15	195	0	Flagged
1958	33	9	143.919	10	4	200	24	Running
1959	1	15	142.721	18	4	200	0	Running
1960	2	18	145.214	9	23	125	0	Rod
Totals						1975	24	

Starts	14
Poles	0
Front Row	1
Wins	0
Top 5	3
Top 10	5
Retired	10

=== FIA World Drivers' Championship results ===
(key) (Races in italics indicate fastest lap)

Year	Entrant	Chassis	Engine	1	2	3	4	5	6	7	8	9	10	11	WDC	Points
1950	Blue Crown Spark Plug / Moore	Kurtis Kraft 2000	Offenhauser L4	GBR	MON	500; 5 †	SUI	BEL	FRA	ITA					21st =	1
1951	Mobiloil / Rotary Engineering	Diedt Tuffanelli Derrico	Offenhauser L4	SUI	500; 9	BEL	FRA	GBR	GER	ITA	ESP				NC	0
1952	Blue Crown Spark Plug / Earl Slick	Diedt Tuffanelli Derrico	Offenhauser L4	SUI	500; 24	BEL	FRA	GBR	GER	NED	ITA				NC	0
1953	J.C. Agajanian	Kuzma	Offenhauser L4	ARG	500; 9 *	NED	BEL	FRA	GBR	GER	SUI	ITA			NC	0
1954	Automobile Shippers / Casaroll	Kurtis Kraft 4000	Offenhauser L4	ARG	500; 15 ‡	BEL	FRA	GBR	GER	SUI	ITA	ESP			NC	0
1955	H.A. Chapman	Kurtis Kraft 500C	Offenhauser L4	ARG	MON	500; 2 џ	BEL	NED	GBR	ITA					13th =	3
1956	Belanger Motors	Kurtis Kraft 500C	Offenhauser L4	ARG	MON	500; 22	BEL	FRA	GBR	GER	ITA				NC	0
1957	Novi Racing	Kurtis Kraft 500F	Novi V8	ARG	MON	500; 15	FRA	GBR	GER	PES	ITA				NC	0
1958	Jones & Maley Cars	Epperly Indy Roadster	Offenhauser L4	ARG	MON	NED	500; 4	BEL	FRA	GBR	GER	POR	ITA	MOR	17th	4
1959	Hoover Motor Express	Epperly Indy Roadster	Offenhauser L4	MON	500; 4	NED	FRA	GBR	GER	POR	ITA	USA			16th	3
1960	Lindsey Hopkins	Watson Indy Roadster	Offenhauser L4	ARG	MON	500; 23	NED	BEL	FRA	GBR	POR	ITA	USA		NC	0

† Indicates shared drive with Joie Chitwood after retiring his own car.
* Indicates shared drive with Chuck Stevenson and Gene Hartley.
‡ Indicates shared drive with Duane Carter, Marshall Teague and Jimmy Jackson after retiring his own car.
џ Indicates shared drive with Paul Russo.
