= 1958 USAC Championship Car season =

Sports season

- USAC National Championship Trail

Season
- Races: 13
- Start date: March 30
- End date: November 11

Awards
- National champion: (United States) Tony Bettenhausen
- Indianapolis 500 winner: (United States) Jimmy Bryan

The 1958 USAC Championship Car season consisted of 13 races, beginning in Trenton, New Jersey on March 30 and concluding in Phoenix, Arizona on November 11. There were also five non-championship events. The USAC National Champion was Tony Bettenhausen and the Indianapolis 500 winner was Jimmy Bryan. The victory was Bryan's final victory in IndyCar racing. There were three fatalities during the season. Pat O'Connor lost his life in a first lap accident during the Indy 500. Art Bisch died of injuries suffered during the race at Lakewood Speedway. Jimmy Reece was killed in a late-race incident at the second Trenton 100. Bettenhausen became the first USAC champion without a single race win (and at the time the only one) during the season until Tom Sneva did so 20 years later.

== Schedule and results ==
Rnd	Date	Race name	Track	Location	Type	Pole position	Winning driver
1	March 30	(United States) Trenton 100	Trenton International Speedway	Trenton, New Jersey	Paved	(United States) Len Sutton	(United States) Len Sutton
2	May 30	(United States) International 500 Mile Sweepstakes^{A}	Indianapolis Motor Speedway	Speedway, Indiana	Paved	(United States) Dick Rathmann	(United States) Jimmy Bryan
3	June 8	(United States) Rex Mays Classic	Milwaukee Mile	West Allis, Wisconsin	Paved	(United States) Art Bisch	(United States) Art Bisch
4	June 15	(United States) Langhorne 100	Langhorne Speedway	Langhorne, Pennsylvania	Dirt	(United States) Jud Larson	(United States) Eddie Sachs
NC	June 29	(Italy) 500 Miglia di Monza	Autodromo Nazionale di Monza	Monza, Italy	Paved	Heat 1: (Italy) Luigi Musso	Heat 1: (United States) Jim Rathmann
NC	June 29	(Italy) 500 Miglia di Monza	Autodromo Nazionale di Monza	Monza, Italy	Paved	Heat 2: (United States) Jim Rathmann	Heat 2: (United States) Jim Rathmann
NC	June 29	(Italy) 500 Miglia di Monza	Autodromo Nazionale di Monza	Monza, Italy	Paved	Heat 3: (United States) Jim Rathmann	Heat 3: (United States) Jim Rathmann
5	July 4	(United States) Atlanta 100	Lakewood Speedway	Atlanta, Georgia	Dirt	(United States) Don Branson	(United States) Jud Larson
NC	July 4	(United States) Pikes Peak Auto Hill Climb	Pikes Peak Highway	Pikes Peak, Colorado	Hill	(United States) Louie Unser^{B}	(United States) Bobby Unser
NC	July 20	(United States) Indianapolis Sweepstakes	Williams Grove Speedway	Mechanicsburg, Pennsylvania	Dirt	(United States) Johnny Thomson	(United States) Jud Larson
6	August 16	(United States) Springfield 100	Illinois State Fairgrounds	Springfield, Illinois	Dirt	(United States) Jud Larson	(United States) Johnny Thomson
7	August 24	(United States) Milwaukee 200	Milwaukee Mile	West Allis, Wisconsin	Paved	(United States) Jim Rathmann	(United States) Rodger Ward
8	September 1	(United States) Ted Horn Memorial	DuQuoin State Fairgrounds	Du Quoin, Illinois	Dirt	(United States) Johnny Thomson	(United States) Johnny Thomson
9	September 6	(United States) Syracuse 100	Syracuse Mile	Syracuse, New York	Dirt	(United States) Jud Larson	(United States) Johnny Thomson
10	September 13	(United States) Hoosier Hundred	Indiana State Fairgrounds	Indianapolis, Indiana	Dirt	(United States) Jud Larson	(United States) Eddie Sachs
11	September 28	(United States) Trenton 100	Trenton International Speedway	Trenton, New Jersey	Paved	(United States) Jimmy Reece	(United States) Rodger Ward
12	October 26	(United States) Golden State 100	California State Fairgrounds	Sacramento, California	Dirt	(United States) Johnny Thomson	(United States) Johnny Thomson
13	November 11	(United States) Bobby Ball Memorial	Arizona State Fairgrounds	Phoenix, Arizona	Dirt	(United States) Rex Easton	(United States) Jud Larson

Paved/Dirt Oval
Road Course/Hill Climb
Non-championship race

^A Indianapolis 500 was USAC-sanctioned and counted towards the 1958 FIA World Championship of Drivers title.
^B No pole is awarded for the Pikes Peak Hill Climb, in this schedule on the pole is the driver who started first. No lap led was awarded for the Pikes Peak Hill Climb, however, a lap was awarded to the drivers that completed the climb.

== Final points standings ==
Pos	Driver	TRE1 (United States)	INDY (United States)	MIL1 (United States)	LHS (United States)	LAK (United States)	SPR (United States)	MIL2 (United States)	DQSF (United States)	SYR (United States)	ISF (United States)	TRE2 (United States)	CSF (United States)	ASF (United States)	Pts
1	(United States) Tony Bettenhausen	2	4	2	5	18	12	25	2	3	5	3	5	2	1830
2	(United States) George Amick	6	2	6	14	2	18	4	18	2	Wth	19	4	15	1640
3	(United States) Johnny Thomson	3	23	4	18	3	1	22	**1**	1	2	2	**1**	14	1520
4	(United States) Jud Larson	5	8	9	**3**	1	**13**		7	**5**	**17**	22	2	1	1250
5	(United States) Rodger Ward	11	20	19	DNQ	7	16	1	4	4	3	1	16	5	1160
6	(United States) Jimmy Bryan		1												1000
7	(United States) Eddie Sachs	DNQ	22	10	1	6	DNQ	3	17	10	1	10	15	3	990
8	(United States) Johnny Boyd		3	5	15										800
9	(United States) Don Branson			DNQ	4	**5**	7	12	3	6	4	6	12	7	790
10	(United States) A. J. Foyt		16	21	2	11	11	7	8	14	8	11	3	4	700
11	(United States) Len Sutton	**1**	32	11	9	4	9	9	6	DNQ	DNQ	8	DNQ	9	670
12	(United States) Jimmy Reece	DNQ	6	3				26	DNQ		7	**7**			660
13	(United States) Don Freeland		7	DNQ	6		3	21	9	18	16	14	DNQ		560
14	(United States) Jim Rathmann		5	7				**23**							560
15	(United States) Bob Veith		26	DNQ			6	2				16	6	18	480
16	(United States) Johnny Tolan		13	8			15	6	5	9	11	18	8	10	450
17	(United States) Eddie Johnson		9	22				10			DNQ	5			360
18	(United States) Joe Barzda RY	9		13	16		4	11		13	15	4			320
19	(United States) Elmer George	12	DNQ	17	13	8	2	DNQ	DNS	16	10	DNQ	17	8	300
20	(United States) Rex Easton		DNQ	15	17	13	5	17	10	7	DNQ	13	13	**6**	270
21	(United States) Jack Turner		25	DNS	12	17		5		11	DNQ	DNQ	DNQ		230
22	(United States) Bill Cheesbourg		10	12	10	10	DNQ	DNS			DNS			DNQ	220
23	(United States) Art Bisch		33	**1**	DNQ	16									200
24	(United States) Ed Elisian		28	DNQ	DNQ		17	8			9	9			180
25	(United States) Ralph Liguori	4			8	15	DNQ				18		DNQ	DNQ	170
26	(United States) Buzz Barton	7		DNQ	11	9	8	DNQ	DNQ		DNQ				170
27	(United States) Earl Motter		DNQ	16	DNQ		10	14	16	DNQ	6		11		130
28	(United States) Al Keller	DNQ	11												100
29	(United States) Jim Packard R						14	DNQ	12	DNQ	12	DNQ	7	DNQ	80
30	(United States) Mike Magill		17		7							DNQ			60
31	(United States) Dempsey Wilson	10	15	20	DNQ			19			DNQ	12	18	11	60
32	(United States) Paul Russo		18							8	14				50
33	(United States) Chuck Rodee	8													50
34	(United States) Johnnie Parsons		12	Wth											50
35	(United States) Wayne Weiler R												9	17	40
36	(United States) Bobby Grim R												10	12	40
37	(United States) Shorty Templeman		19					13	11	12	DNQ	20	DNQ	DNQ	30
38	(United States) Roy Graham					12	DNQ					DNQ			10
-	(United States) Bob Schroeder R					DNQ	DNQ	DNQ	13	15	DNQ	15	DNQ	DNQ	0
-	(United States) Gene Hartley		DNQ					18			13				0
-	(United States) Pat O’Connor	13	29												0
-	(United States) Lloyd Ruby R													13	0
-	(United States) Dick Linder R								14	17	DNQ	17			0
-	(United States) Dick Rathmann		**27**	14				24							0
-	(United States) Troy Ruttman		DNQ										14	DNP	0
-	(United States) Bob Christie		14												0
-	(United States) Jiggs Peters					14									0
-	(United States) Jimmy Davies							20	15		DNQ	DNP			0
-	(United States) Gene Force							15			DNQ				0
-	(United States) Bill Homeier		DNQ										DNQ	16	0
-	(United States) Pat Flaherty		DNQ					16							0
-	(United States) Billy Garrett		21	18											0
-	(United States) Tony Bonadies		DNQ	DNQ								21			0
-	(United States) Chuck Weyant		24	DNQ			DNQ	DNS	DNQ						0
-	(United States) Paul Goldsmith R		30												0
-	(United States) Jerry Unser		31				DNQ	DNQ	DNQ		DNQ				0
-	(United States) Red Amick	DNS													0
-	(United States) Jim McWithey		DNQ							DNQ	DNQ	DNQ			0
-	(United States) Van Johnson		DNQ				DNQ								0
-	(United States) Allen Crowe					DNQ	DNQ								0
-	(United States) Jimmy Daywalt		DNQ								DNQ				0
-	(United States) Don Edmunds		DNQ									DNQ			0
-	(United States) Bill Hyde												DNQ	DNQ	0
-	(United States) Ernie Koch												DNQ	DNQ	0
-	(United States) Tom Pistone		DNP	DNQ											0
-	(United Kingdom) Peter Collins	DNQ													0
-	(United States) Fred Agabashian		DNQ												0
-	(United States) Bud Clemons		DNQ												0
-	(United States) Bob Cortner		DNQ												0
-	(United States) Ray Crawford		DNQ												0
-	(United States) Jack Ensley		DNQ												0
-	(Argentina) Juan Manuel Fangio		DNQ												0
-	(United States) Joe Giba		DNQ												0
-	(United States) Al Herman		DNQ												0
-	(United States) Eddie Russo		DNQ												0
-	(United States) Carroll Shelby		DNQ												0
-	(United States) Marshall Teague		DNQ												0
-	(United States) Leroy Warriner		DNQ												0
-	(United States) Norm Hall				DNQ										0
-	(United States) Bill Chennault								DNQ						0
-	(United States) Chuck Hulse												DNQ		0
-	(United States) Buddy Cagle													DNQ	0
-	(United States) Don Whittington													DNQ	0
-	(United States) Dutch Schaefer		DNP												0
Pos	Driver	TRE1 (United States)	INDY (United States)	MIL1 (United States)	LHS (United States)	LAK (United States)	SPR (United States)	MIL2 (United States)	DQSF (United States)	SYR (United States)	ISF (United States)	TRE2 (United States)	CSF (United States)	ASF (United States)	Pts

Color	Result
Gold	Winner
Silver	2nd place
Bronze	3rd place
Green	4th & 5th place
Light Blue	6th-10th place
Dark Blue	Finished (Outside Top 10)
Purple	Did not finish (Ret)
Red	Did not qualify (DNQ)
Brown	Withdrawn (Wth)
Black	Disqualified (DSQ)
White	Did not start (DNS)
Blank	Did not participate (DNP)
Blank	Not competing

**In-line notation**
**Bold**	Pole position
Italics	Ran fastest race lap
*	Led most race laps
RY Rookie of the Year
R Rookie

== See also ==
- 1958 Indianapolis 500
