= Johnny Thomson =

American racing driver (1922–1960)

- Born: John Ashley Thomson; April 9, 1922 Lowell, Massachusetts, U.S.
- Died: September 24, 1960 (aged 38) Allentown Fairgrounds, Allentown, Pennsylvania, U.S.

Champ Car career
- 62 races run over 8 years
- Years active: 1953–1960
- Best finish: 3rd – 1955, 1958, 1959
- First race: 1953 Indianapolis 500 (Indianapolis Motor Speedway)
- Last race: 1960 Hoosier Hundred (Indiana State Fairgrounds)
- First win: 1955 Rex Mays Classic (Milwaukee)
- Last win: 1959 Rex Mays Classic (Milwaukee)
Wins	Podiums	Poles
7	24	10

Formula One World Championship career
- Active years: 1953–1960
- Entries: 8
- Championships: 0
- Wins: 0
- Podiums: 1
- Career points: 10
- Pole positions: 1
- Fastest laps: 1
- First entry: 1953 Indianapolis 500
- Last entry: 1960 Indianapolis 500

John Ashley Thomson (April 9, 1922 – September 24, 1960) was an American racecar driver. Thomson was nicknamed "the Flying Scot." He won several championships in midgets and sprint cars before competing in Championship Car (now IndyCar) racing. He won the pole position for the 1959 Indianapolis 500.

== Background ==
Thomson was born on April 9, 1922, to William and Marion Ross Thomson. He graduated from Lowell High School then the New England Aircraft School.

Thompson served in the United States Air Force as a crew chief during World War II in Corsica and Italy between 1942 and 1945 on a B-25 bomber. Thomson was awarded five service stars and the Distinguished Air Force Medal.

Thomson met his future wife Evelyn Peterson in 1951. He moved from the Springfield, Massachusetts, area to a five-acre ranch that he built near Boyertown, Pennsylvania, in the mid 1950s.

== Midget cars ==
Thomson began watching races at a track across the street from his home in 1937 and 1938 in Lowell. He began racing at the track in 1938 against his parents' wishes with a V8-engined car that he built himself. After returning from the war, he resumed racing midgets at the Bay State Racing Association. His first win happened at Seekonk Speedway in 1946 and he won seven times in 1947.

Thomson won the 1948 United Car Owners Association (UCOA) New England title after winning 32 midget events. He won his second UCOA title in 1949; he also race in some American Racing Drivers Club (ARDC) events. He switched to the ARDC in 1950 to finish fifth in points and took second in points in 1951.

Thompson won the 1952 AAA Eastern division midget car championship after winning twice at Williams Grove Speedway.

== Championship cars ==
Thomson drove in the AAA and USAC Championship Car series, racing in the 1953-1960 seasons with 69 starts, including the Indianapolis 500 races in each season. He finished in the top ten 43 times, with seven victories. His best Indy finish was third in 1959 after starting the race on the pole position. Roy Sherman, the first National Midget Champion, was his chief mechanic for several Indy 500s.

Thomson won his first champ car race at the Milwaukee Mile in 1955. He ended up finishing third in season points after having to sit out the middle part of the season while healing from a end over end flip at the Langhorne Speedway circle. He clipped Jerry Hoyt's car while in the lead; he broke five ribs, bruised his vertebrae, broke his shoulder in eight places. In 1957, Thomson won at Langhorne; he also earned two pole positions. In October, he crashed at the California State Fairgrounds Race Track suffering internal injuries. In 1958, he finished third with wins at the Springfield Mile, DuQuoin State Fairgrounds, California Fairgrounds, and Syracuse Mile. He earned two pole positions in 13 starts. In 1959, he raced primarily in champ cars and finished third in national points after a win at Milwaukee plus three fast times. He had a wreck in a sprint car race at Williams Grove in September and missed the rest of the season.

Thomson was the first driver to win a 100-mile (160 km) dirt track race in less than an hour at Langhorne Speedway. His champ car's average speed was 100.174 miles per hour.

== Sprint cars ==
Thomson made his first "Big Car" (now sprint car) start in September 1952 at the Vermont State Fairgrounds. He primarily raced on the AAA Eastern circuit in 1953; he finished ninth after winning at Altamont, New York. Thomson won the Eastern AAA Big Car championship in 1954 after winning eight events. AAA ended sanctioning after the 1955 season and it was replaced by the United States Automobile Club (USAC) in 1956. He continued in the Eastern Division in 1956 and had wins at Williams Grove, Trenton Speedway, and Reading Fairgrounds Speedway; he finished second in points behind Tommy Hinnershitz. Thomson's sprint car races in 1957 were primarily in the USAC Eastern division; he won twice at Reading and once at the Allentown fairgrounds to finish third in points. Thomas returned from injury to win the first 1958 USAC Sprint Car Series Eastern race at Williams Grove; he followed up with two wins at Reading and one at Allentown to win the Eastern championship.

== Death ==
On September 24, 1960, Thomson was racing in a USAC Sprint Car at the Great Allentown Fair at the Allentown Fairgrounds. On a rutty and dry track, his car flipped and crashed through the backstretch fence and flipped into the infield. He was thrown out of the car and was pinned underneath the car after it stopped rolling. His leg was broken, and he died several hours later at Allentown General Hospital in Allentown, Pennsylvania, at age 38. His friend Tommy Hinnershitz announced his retirement from racing shortly after Thomson's death.

Thomson was survived by his wife and four sons (Dale, Dana, David and Darryl).

== Career awards ==
Thomson was inducted in the National Sprint Car Hall of Fame in 1996 and the National Midget Auto Racing Hall of Fame in 1997.

== Television Appearance ==
Thomson was a contestant on Bud Collyer's "Beat The Clock".

== Complete AAA/USAC Championship Car results ==
Year	1	2	3	4	5	6	7	8	9	10	11	12	13	Pos	Points
1953	INDY; 32	MIL; 13	SPR	DET	SPR	MIL	DUQ	PIK	SYR	ISF	SAC	PHX		-	0
1954	INDY; 24	MIL; DNS	LAN	DAR; DNQ	SPR	MIL	DUQ	PIK	SYR; 9	ISF	SAC	PHX	LVG	43rd	40
1955	INDY; 4	MIL; 1	LAN; 15	SPR	MIL	DUQ	PIK	SYR; 5	ISF; 2	SAC; 2	PHX; 2			3rd	1.380
1956	INDY; 32	MIL; 2	LAN; 18	DAR; 9	ATL; 3	SPR; 10	MIL; 14	DUQ; 2	SYR; 3	ISF; 16	SAC; DNP	PHX		10th	710
1957	INDY; 12	LAN; 1	MIL; 2	DET; 18	ATL; 17	SPR; 14	MIL; 4	DUQ; 2	SYR; 3	ISF; 17	TRE; 2	SAC; 14	PHX	7th	1.110
1958	TRE; 3	INDY; 23	MIL; 4	LAN; 18	ATL; 3	SPR; 1	MIL; 22	DUQ; 1	SYR; 1	ISF; 2	TRE; 2	SAC; 1	PHX; 14	3rd	1.520
1959	DAY; 7	TRE; 20	INDY; 3	MIL; 1	LAN; DNQ	SPR; 4	MIL; 2	DUQ; 16	SYR; 16	ISF; Wth	TRE	SAC	PHX	3rd	1.400
1960	TRE; 20	INDY; 5	MIL; 18	LAN; DNQ	SPR; 9	MIL; 23	DUQ; 9	SYR; 4	ISF; 5	TRE	SAC	PHX		7th	800

== Indianapolis 500 results ==
Year	Car	Start	Qual	Rank	Finish	Laps	Led	Retired
1953	56	33	135.262	33	32	6	0	Ignition
1954	43	4	138.787	12	24	165	0	Stalled
1955	44	33	134.113	33	4	200	0	Running
1956	88	18	145.549	2	32	22	0	Spun FS
1957	10	11	143.529	4	12	199	5	Flagged
1958	7	22	142.908	20	23	52	0	Steering
1959	3	1	145.908	1	3rd	200	40	Running
1960	3	17	146.443	3	5	200	10	Running
Totals						1044	55	

Starts	8
Poles	1
Front Row	1
Wins	0
Top 5	3
Top 10	3
Retired	4

== World Championship career summary ==
The Indianapolis 500 was part of the FIA World Championship from 1950 through 1960. Drivers competing at Indy during those years were credited with World Championship points and participation. Thomson participated in eight World Championship races. He started on the pole once, set one fastest lead lap, and finished on the podium once, accumulating a total of ten World Championship points.
