= Jud Larson =

American racing driver (1923–1966)

- Born: Eugene Wesley Larson; January 21, 1923 Grand Prairie, Texas, U.S.
- Died: June 11, 1966 (aged 43) Reading, Pennsylvania, U.S.

Champ Car career
- 51 races run over 10 years
- Years active: 1951–1953, 1956–1959, 1964–1966
- Best finish: 4th – 1958
- First race: 1956 Hoosier Hundred (ISF)
- Last race: 1965 Bobby Ball Memorial (Phoenix)
- First win: 1956 Golden State 100 (Sacramento)
- Last win: 1958 Bobby Ball Memorial (ASF)
Wins	Podiums	Poles
5	12	9

Formula One World Championship career
- Active years: 1952–1953, 1957–1959
- Team(s): Meyer, Kurtis Kraft, Snowberger, Watson
- Entries: 5 (2 starts)
- Championships: 0
- Wins: 0
- Podiums: 0
- Career points: 0
- Pole positions: 0
- Fastest laps: 0
- First entry: 1952 Indianapolis 500
- Last entry: 1959 Indianapolis 500

Eugene Wesley "Jud" Larson (January 21, 1923 Grand Prairie, Texas – June 11, 1966 Reading, Pennsylvania) was an American racecar driver.

== Career ==
Larson drove in the USAC Championship Car series, racing in the 1956-1959 and 1964-1965 seasons with 53 starts, including the 1958 and 1959 Indianapolis 500 races. He finished in the top ten 38 times, with 7 victories.

Less than two weeks before his death, Larsen pulled ahead of pole-sitter Greg Weld during the second lap of a feature USAC sprint race in Winchester, and held onto his lead to win the thirty-lap race.

== Accident, death and interment ==
Larson died on June 11, 1966, as a result of injuries sustained in a sprint car crash at the Reading Fairgrounds Speedway in Berks County, Pennsylvania that also claimed the life of Red Riegel. According to The Kansas City Star, "Authorities said the accident occurred when the wheels of their cars locked during the second lap of the featured event." Both cars then "went up a short embankment around the first turn near the grandstand and tumbled back onto the track two times in succession," pinning both men inside their respective cars. A crowd of roughly six thousand witnessed the accident. Larson was buried at the Cook-Walden Capital Parks Cemetery and Mausoleum in Pflugerville, Texas. Mario Andretti was among those who later paid tribute to him.

== Complete AAA/USAC Championship Car results ==
Year	1	2	3	4	5	6	7	8	9	10	11	12	13	14	15	16	17	18	Pos	Points
1951	INDY	MIL; DNQ	LAN; DNQ	DAR	SPR	MIL	DUQ	DUQ	PIK	SYR	DET	DNC	SJS	PHX	BAY				-	0
1952	INDY; DNS	MIL; DNQ	RAL	SPR	MIL	DET	DUQ	PIK	SYR	DNC	SJS	PHX							-	0
1953	INDY; DNQ	MIL	SPR	DET	SPR	MIL	DUQ	PIK	SYR	ISF	SAC	PHX							-	0
1956	INDY	MIL	LAN	DAR	ATL	SPR	MIL	DUQ	SYR	ISF; 4	SAC; 1	PHX; DNQ							22nd	320
1957	INDY; DNQ	LAN; 16	MIL	DET; 4	ATL; 2	SPR; 2	MIL; 8	DUQ; 1	SYR; 6	ISF; 1	TRE; 22	SAC; 3	PHX; 12						5th	1,170
1958	TRE; 5	INDY; 8	MIL; 9	LAN; 3	ATL; 1	SPR; 13	MIL	DUQ; 7	SYR; 5	ISF; 17	TRE; 22	SAC; 2	PHX; 1						4th	1,250
1959	DAY; 16	TRE	INDY; 29	MIL; 4	LAN; 2	SPR; DNS	MIL	DUQ	SYR	ISF	TRE; DNP	SAC	PHX						20th	280
1964	PHX	TRE; DNQ	INDY; DNQ	MIL; DNQ	LAN; 10	TRE; 15	SPR; 11	MIL; 17	DUQ; 6	ISF; 4	TRE	SAC; 6	PHX; 6						13th	490
1965	PHX; 12	TRE; 5	INDY; DNQ	MIL	LAN; DNQ	PIP	TRE; 6	IRP; 19	ATL; 16	LAN; 12	MIL; 7	SPR; 8	MIL; 9	DUQ; 4	ISF; 3	TRE; 8	SAC; 5	PHX; 8	9th	1,028
1966	PHX	TRE; DNQ	INDY; DNP	MIL	LAN	ATL	PIP	IRP	LAN	SPR	MIL	DUQ	ISF	TRE	SAC	PHX			-	0

== Indianapolis 500 results ==
Year	Car	Start	Qual	Rank	Finish	Laps	Led	Retired
1958	44	19	143.512	11	8	200	0	Running
1959	7	19	142.298	23	29	45	0	Crash T3
Totals						245	0	

Starts	2
Poles	0
Front Row	0
Wins	0
Top 5	0
Top 10	1
Retired	1

== World Championship career summary ==
The Indianapolis 500 was part of the FIA World Championship from 1950 through 1960. Drivers competing at Indy during those years were credited with World Championship points and participation. Larson participated in two World Championship races but scored no World Championship points.

== Awards ==
Larson was inducted in the National Sprint Car Hall of Fame in 1992.
