= 1957 USAC Championship Car season =

Sports season

- USAC National Championship Trail

Season
- Races: 13
- Start date: May 30
- End date: November 11

Awards
- National champion: (United States) Jimmy Bryan
- Indianapolis 500 winner: (United States) Sam Hanks

The 1957 USAC Championship Car season consisted of 13 races, beginning in Speedway, Indiana on May 30 and concluding in Phoenix, Arizona on November 11. There were also five non-championship events. The USAC National Champion was Jimmy Bryan and the Indianapolis 500 winner was Sam Hanks. Hanks would retire from IndyCar racing following his Indy victory but still raced USAC Stock Cars until the end of this year. Keith Andrews was killed in crash while practicing for the Indianapolis 500; he was 36 years old.

== Schedule and results ==
Rnd	Date	Race name	Track	Location	Type	Pole position	Winning driver
1	May 30	(United States) International 500 Mile Sweepstakes^{A}	Indianapolis Motor Speedway	Speedway, Indiana	Paved	(United States) Pat O'Connor	(United States) Sam Hanks
2	June 2	(United States) Langhorne 100	Langhorne Speedway	Langhorne, Pennsylvania	Dirt	(United States) Johnny Thomson	(United States) Johnny Thomson
3	June 9	(United States) Rex Mays Classic	Milwaukee Mile	West Allis, Wisconsin	Paved	(United States) Jimmy Bryan	(United States) Rodger Ward
4	June 23	(United States) Detroit 100	Michigan State Fairgrounds Speedway	Detroit, Michigan	Dirt	(United States) George Amick	(United States) Jimmy Bryan
NC	June 29	(Italy) 500 Miglia di Monza^{B}	Autodromo Nazionale di Monza	Monza, Italy	Paved	Heat 1: (United States) Tony Bettenhausen	Heat 1: (United States) Jimmy Bryan
NC	June 29	(Italy) 500 Miglia di Monza^{B}	Autodromo Nazionale di Monza	Monza, Italy	Paved	Heat 2: (United States) Jimmy Bryan	Heat 2: (United States) Jimmy Bryan
NC	June 29	(Italy) 500 Miglia di Monza^{B}	Autodromo Nazionale di Monza	Monza, Italy	Paved	Heat 3: (United States) Jimmy Bryan	Heat 3: (United States) Troy Ruttman
5	July 4	(United States) Atlanta 100	Lakewood Speedway	Atlanta, Georgia	Dirt	(United States) Jimmy Bryan	(United States) George Amick
NC	July 4	(United States) Pikes Peak Auto Hill Climb	Pikes Peak Highway	Pikes Peak, Colorado	Hill	(United States) Bill McConnell^{C}	(United States) Bob Finney
NC	July 20	(United States) Indianapolis Sweepstakes	Williams Grove Speedway	Mechanicsburg, Pennsylvania	Dirt	(United States) Jud Larson	(United States) Jud Larson
6	August 17	(United States) Springfield 100	Illinois State Fairgrounds	Springfield, Illinois	Dirt	(United States) George Amick	(United States) Rodger Ward
7	August 25	(United States) Milwaukee 200	Milwaukee Mile	West Allis, Wisconsin	Paved	(United States) Andy Linden	(United States) Jim Rathmann
8	September 2	(United States) Ted Horn Memorial	DuQuoin State Fairgrounds	Du Quoin, Illinois	Dirt	(United States) Jud Larson	(United States) Jud Larson
9	September 7	(United States) Syracuse 100	Syracuse Mile	Syracuse, New York	Dirt	(United States) Elmer George	(United States) Elmer George
10	September 14	(United States) Hoosier Hundred	Indiana State Fairgrounds	Indianapolis, Indiana	Dirt	(United States) Jud Larson	(United States) Jud Larson
11	September 29	(United States) Trenton 100	Trenton International Speedway	Trenton, New Jersey	Paved	(United States) Johnny Thomson	(United States) Pat O'Connor
12	October 20	(United States) Golden State 100	California State Fairgrounds	Sacramento, California	Dirt	(United States) Rodger Ward	(United States) Rodger Ward
13	November 11	(United States) Bobby Ball Memorial	Arizona State Fairgrounds	Phoenix, Arizona	Dirt	(United States) Rodger Ward	(United States) Jimmy Bryan

Paved/Dirt Oval
Road Course/Hill Climb

^A Indianapolis 500 was USAC-sanctioned and counted towards the 1957 FIA World Championship of Drivers title.
^B Run in three heats of 166 miles (267 km).
^C No pole is awarded for the Pikes Peak Hill Climb, in this schedule on the pole is the driver who started first. No lap led was awarded for the Pikes Peak Hill Climb, however, a lap was awarded to the drivers that completed the climb.

== Final points standings ==
Pos	Driver	INDY (United States)	LHS (United States)	MIL1 (United States)	MSF (United States)	LAK (United States)	SPR (United States)	MIL2 (United States)	DQSF (United States)	SYR (United States)	ISF (United States)	TRE (United States)	CSF (United States)	ASF (United States)	Pts
1	(United States) Jimmy Bryan	3	DNQ	**19**	1	**13**	7	22	18	4	2	8	2	1	1650
2	(United States) Jim Rathmann	2		5				1				6	12	6	1470
3	(United States) George Amick	DNQ	5	6	**2**	1	**3**	5	16	5	3	3	4	11	1400
4	(United States) Pat O'Connor	**8**	DNQ	4			DNQ	3	8	2	10	1	15	2	1250
5	(United States) Jud Larson	DNQ	16		4	2	2	8	**1**	6	**1**	22	3	12	1170
6	(United States) Andy Linden	5	6	18	3	3	5	**10**	DNQ	7	18	13	8		1130
7	(United States) Johnny Thomson	12	**1**	2	18	17	14	4	2	3	17	**2**	14		1110
8	(United States) Johnny Boyd	6		3			4	24	6	9	14	9	6	3	1040
9	(United States) Sam Hanks	1													1000
10	(United States) Elmer George	33	17	7	5	15	6	6	4	**1**	6	21	10	16	830
11	(United States) Rodger Ward	30	DNQ	1	16	16	1	18	3	18	13	20	**1**	**13**	740
12	(United States) Bob Veith	9	7	14	6	4	18	13	5	DNQ	DNQ	15	7	10	650
13	(United States) Paul Russo	4													600
14	(United States) Jimmy Reece	18	14	12	9			2	14	10	8	5	13		550
15	(United States) Ed Elisian	29	4	DNQ	13	5	15	20	10	13	7	10	17		340
16	(United States) Len Sutton						DNQ	19	7	17	4	4	DNQ	17	300
17	(United States) Billy Garrett	DNQ	8	DNQ	7		DNQ	9	12		DNQ	DNQ	5	18	300
18	(United States) Marshall Teague	7	DNQ												300
19	(United States) Don Branson		9	21	10	8	11	DNQ	9	DNS	5	19			280
20	(United States) Art Bisch		3	20				DNQ					DNQ	4	260
21	(United States) Gene Hartley	10		15	15	7					DNP				210
22	(United States) Jack Turner	11	DNQ	22			DNQ	11	11	DNP	9		Wth		200
23	(United States) Johnnie Tolan	20	DNQ	8				12	DNQ	11	DNQ		16	5	190
24	(United States) Don Freeland	17	13	DNQ	8	6	8	15		12	16		DNQ	14	190
25	(United States) Eddie Sachs	23	2	16											160
26	(United States) A. J. Foyt RY						9	23	DNQ	DNQ	DNQ	11	9	7	160
27	(United States) Johnnie Parsons	16						7							120
28	(United States) Ralph Liguori R		11	DNQ			10	DNQ	17	8	12	DNQ			110
29	(United States) Tony Bettenhausen	15		DNQ				21	15	DNQ	11	7	18		80
30	(United States) Bud Randall R		18		14	10	DNQ	26	DNQ	DNQ	DNQ	DNQ	DNQ	8	80
31	(United States) Bill Cheesbourg	26		11	12	9		DNQ		DNP	DNQ	DNQ		DNQ	70
32	(United States) Jim McWithey	DNQ		9				DNQ		DNQ	DNQ	DNQ			40
33	(United States) Earl Motter													9	40
34	(United States) Don Edmunds R	19	15		17	11	17	DNQ	13	14	DNQ	DNQ	11	DNQ	40
35	(United States) Van Johnson		10		DNQ		16	DNQ		15	DNQ	DNQ			30
36	(United States) Troy Ruttman	31		10				25							30
37	(United States) Chuck Weyant	14			11			DNQ		DNQ	DNQ				20
38	(United States) Al Herman	21	DNQ					14		DNQ	DNQ	12			10
39	(United States) Dick Rathmann	DNQ					12	16		DNP	DNQ	16		DNQ	10
40	(United States) Al Keller	27	DNQ			12									10
41	(United States) Ken Gottschalk		12	DNQ											10
-	(United States) Jimmy Daywalt	28		13								14			0
-	(United States) Mike Magill	24	DNQ				13	DNQ		16	DNQ	DNQ			0
-	(United States) Bob Christie	13													0
-	(United States) Jim Hemmings R			DNQ		14									0
-	(United States) Rex Easton				DNQ		DNQ				15	DNQ			0
-	(United States) Bud Clemons R	DNQ												15	0
-	(United States) Shorty Templeman							17			DNQ	17			0
-	(United States) Fred Agabashian	22		17											0
-	(United States) Charles Musselman		DNQ			18									0
-	(United States) Chuck Rodee R		DNQ									18			0
-	(United States) Eddie Johnson	25													0
-	(United States) Eddie Russo	32	DNQ												0
-	(United States) Bob Tattersall		DNS												0
-	(United States) Gene Force	DNQ		DNQ											0
-	(United States) Danny Kladis	DNQ		DNQ											0
-	(United States) Ray Crawford	DNQ						DNQ							0
-	(United States) Don Evans						DNQ		DNQ						0
-	(United States) Luther Baughman						DNQ				DNQ				0
-	(United States) Bill Homeier												DNQ	DNQ	0
-	(United States) Ernie Koch												DNQ	DNQ	0
-	(United States) Don Whittington												DNQ	DNQ	0
-	(United States) Keith Andrews	DNQ													0
-	(United States) Johnny Baldwin	DNQ													0
-	(United States) Tony Bonadies	DNQ													0
-	(United States) Jimmy Davies	DNQ													0
-	(Italy) Giuseppe Farina	DNQ													0
-	(United States) Johnny Fedricks	DNQ													0
-	(United States) Andy Furci	DNQ													0
-	(United States) Cliff Griffith	DNQ													0
-	(United States) Cal Niday	DNQ													0
-	(United States) Leroy Warriner	DNQ													0
-	(United States) Dempsey Wilson	DNQ													0
-	(United States) Chuck Arnold											DNQ			0
-	(United States) Del Fanning													DNQ	0
Pos	Driver	INDY (United States)	LHS (United States)	MIL1 (United States)	MSF (United States)	LAK (United States)	SPR (United States)	MIL2 (United States)	DQSF (United States)	SYR (United States)	ISF (United States)	TRE (United States)	CSF (United States)	ASF (United States)	Pts

Color	Result
Gold	Winner
Silver	2nd place
Bronze	3rd place
Green	4th & 5th place
Light Blue	6th-10th place
Dark Blue	Finished (Outside Top 10)
Purple	Did not finish (Ret)
Red	Did not qualify (DNQ)
Brown	Withdrawn (Wth)
Black	Disqualified (DSQ)
White	Did not start (DNS)
Blank	Did not participate (DNP)
Blank	Not competing

**In-line notation**
**Bold**	Pole position
Italics	Ran fastest race lap
*	Led most race laps
RY Rookie of the Year
R Rookie

== See also ==
- 1957 Indianapolis 500
