= 1958 Indianapolis 500 =

American motor race

42nd Indianapolis 500
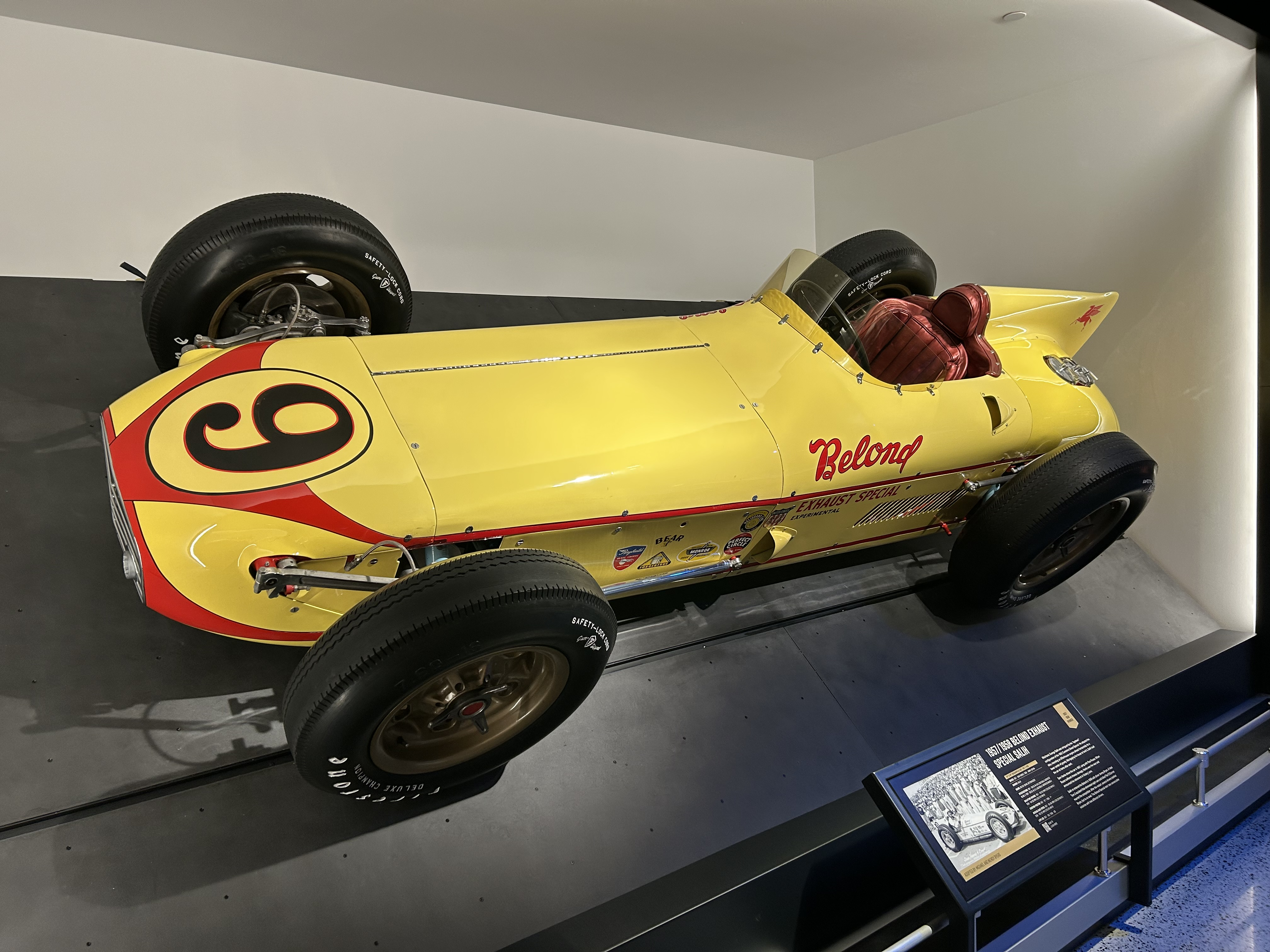

Indianapolis Motor Speedway

Indianapolis 500
- Sanctioning body: USAC
- Date: May 30, 1958
- Winner: Jimmy Bryan
- Winning team: George Salih
- Winning Chief Mechanic: George Salih & Howard Gilbert
- Time of race: 3:44:13.80
- Average speed: 133.791 mph (215.316 km/h)
- Pole position: Dick Rathmann
- Pole speed: 145.974 mph (234.922 km/h)
- Most laps led: Jimmy Bryan (139)

Pre-race ceremonies
- Pace car: Pontiac Bonneville
- Pace car driver: Sam Hanks
- Starter: Bill Vanderwater
- Honorary referee: Robert A. Stranahan, Jr.
- Estimated attendance: 175,000

Chronology
Previous	Next
1957	1959

The 42nd International 500-Mile Sweepstakes was held at the Indianapolis Motor Speedway on Friday, May 30, 1958. The event was part of the 1958 USAC National Championship Trail, and was also race 4 of 11 in the 1958 World Championship of Drivers.

The race is best known for a massive first-lap, 15-car pileup that resulted in the death of fan-favorite driver Pat O'Connor.

Jimmy Bryan was the race winner. This marked the first time that one car would carry two drivers to separate wins at the race, in back-to-back years, with Sam Hanks winning the previous year's race in the same car.

The race featured young rookie A. J. Foyt's debut at Indy. On lap 148, he spun in an oil slick, blew out the tires, and dropped out of the race.

Juan Manuel Fangio, the 46-year-old five-time Formula One Drivers' World Champion, had set pole and fastest lap in the first F1 race of the season, then was kidnapped in Cuba, and skipped the Monaco and Dutch Grands Prix he had already won in earlier years. He arrived at Indy under much fanfare as he attempted to qualify for the Indy 500 and score points towards the '58 World Championship. He practiced early in the month, but withdrew when he realised that neither the Kurtis Kraft #54 (with Novi engine) nor the #77 Offy-powered car gave him a chance to win. These cars were qualified by others for the last row only, proving Fangio's point. He soon retired from Formula One as his Maserati team was off pace compared to Ferrari and new British challengers.

== Time trials ==
Time trials were scheduled for four days.

- Saturday May 17 – Pole Day time trials
  - Ed Elisian set a new one-lap track record of 146.508 mph to sit tentatively on the pole position. His four-lap average stood at 145.926 mph. Later in the day, Dick Rathmann qualified at 145.974 mph to win the pole position. Rathmann was not able to beat Elisian's single-lap record, but his four-lap record eclipsed Elisian overall by a mere 0.08 seconds.
- Sunday May 18 – Second day time trials
- Saturday May 24 – Third day time trials
- Sunday May 25 – Fourth day time trials

== Starting grid ==
Row	Inside		Middle		Outside	
1	97	(United States) Dick Rathmann	5	(United States) Ed Elisian	16	(United States) Jimmy Reece
2	14	(United States) Bob Veith	4	(United States) Pat O'Connor	45	(United States) Johnnie Parsons W
3	1	(United States) Jimmy Bryan	9	(United States) Johnny Boyd	33	(United States) Tony Bettenhausen
4	25	(United States) Jack Turner	8	(United States) Rodger Ward	29	(United States) A. J. Foyt R
5	26	(United States) Don Freeland	15	(United States) Paul Russo	43	(United States) Billy Garrett
6	31	(United States) Paul Goldsmith R	65	(United States) Bob Christie	88	(United States) Eddie Sachs
7	44	(United States) Jud Larson R	2	(United States) Jim Rathmann	52	(United States) Al Keller
8	7	(United States) Johnny Thomson	83	(United States) Shorty Templeman	92	(United States) Jerry Unser R
9	99	(United States) George Amick R	61	(United States) Eddie Johnson	68	(United States) Len Sutton R
10	57	(United States) Art Bisch R	89	(United States) Chuck Weyant	19	(United States) Johnnie Tolan
11	77	(United States) Mike Magill	59	(United States) Dempsey Wilson R	54	(United States) Bill Cheesbourg

R Indianapolis 500 rookie
W Indianapolis 500 winner

=== Alternates ===
- First alternate: Gene Hartley (#24)

=== Failed to qualify ===
- Fred Agabashian (#14, #56, #57, #75)
- Tony Bonadies R (#58)
- Bud Clemons R (#59)
- Bob Cortner R (#93) – Did not finish rookie test
- Ray Crawford (#49)
- Jimmy Daywalt (#57, #69, #82)
- Rex Easton R (#10, #72)
- Don Edmunds (#92)
- Jack Ensley R (#17)
- Juan Manuel Fangio R (#54, #77)
- Pat Flaherty W (#5) – Entry declined, failed physical
- Elmer George (#10, #28)
- Joe Giba R (#62)
- Gene Hartley (#24)
- Al Herman (#68, #75)
- Bill Homeier (#74, #95)
- Van Johnson R (#58)
- Jim McWithey R (#66)
- Earl Motter R (#61) – Passed rookie test
- Tom Pistone R (#66) – Entry declined, lack of experience
- Eddie Russo (#55)
- Troy Ruttman W (#98)
- Dutch Schaefer R (#61) – Entry declined, lack of experience
- Carroll Shelby R (#17) – Did not begin rookie test
- Marshall Teague (#18)
- Leroy Warriner R (#95)

== Race summary ==
=== Opening lap crash – Death of Pat O'Connor ===
For the second year in a row, the starting grid was assembled single-file in the pit lane. The cars were instructed to pull away and assemble into the official eleven rows of three after they entered the racing surface. Confusion occurred on the pace lap, however, as the three drivers of the front row (Dick Rathmann, Ed Elisian, and Jimmy Reece) pulled away, and inadvertently escaped the pace car. The three cars were alone, and rather than wait for the grid to catch up, they rushed around to catch up to the back of the field. Sam Hanks pulled the pace car off the track and into the pits, but chief starter Bill Vanderwater displayed the yellow flag to wave off the start. An extra pace lap was allowed, and the front row re-took their position at the front of the pack. By the time Hanks was ready to pull the pace car back out on the track, the field had re-formed, and Vanderwater gave them the green flag.

At the start, Dick Rathmann took the lead in turn 1, Ed Elisian was second, and Jimmy Reece third. As the cars battled into turn three, Elisian spun and took Rathmann to the outside wall, triggering a huge 15-car pileup. Reece braked and was hit from behind by Pat O'Connor. O'Connor's car sailed fifty feet in the air, landed upside down and burst into flames. Several other cars spun to the wall and into the infield. Jerry Unser touched wheels with Paul Goldsmith, and flipped over the outside wall. Unser suffered a dislocated shoulder.

Although O'Connor was incinerated in the accident, medical officials said that he was probably killed instantly from a fractured skull.

=== First half ===
Jimmy Bryan escaped the opening lap crash, and came around to lead the first lap. Eddie Sachs and Tony Bettenhausen also got by unscathed, to run second and third. Due to the crash, the yellow light stayed on for 25 minutes (approximately 18 laps). Four of the top five starting positions were out of the race from the crash, including polesitter Dick Rathmann, who placed 27th.

After a lengthy cleanup, the green flag came back out around lap 19. Bryan, Sachs, Bettenhausen, and rookie George Amick all traded time in the lead. There were 14 lead changes in the first half.

The second yellow came out on lap 38 when Chuck Weyant crashed in turn 4.

Eddie Sachs, a contender in the first quarter of the race, dropped out on lap 68 with transmission trouble.

=== Second half ===
The second half of the race settled down to a battle between Jimmy Bryan and Johnny Boyd, with rookie George Amick also in contention. Boyd lost the lead during a pit stop on lap 126. Bryan's team had faster pit stops (three stops for 1 minute and 31 seconds), which allowed him to hold the lead.

Rookie A. J. Foyt spun out on lap 149. He hit an oil slick in turn one and went sideways, blowing out all four tires. The car did not make contact with the wall, but the engine stalled and Foyt was out of the race. He placed 16th.

With 25 laps to go, Boyd was running about one second behind Bryan, with Amick (a lap down in third place) running between them. Boyd suddenly slowed on lap 177 with a worn out right rear tire, sending him to the pits, and elevating Amick to second. Bryan led the final 75 laps (139 total) en route to victory. Bryan was victorious in the same car in which Sam Hanks won the 500 a year earlier. Amick stayed within striking distance of Bryan for the last part of the race, but Amick's crew chief decided to accept a safe second-place rather than risk pushing their rookie driver into a mistake.

During the race as the news of Pat O'Connor's death spread around the track, the mood among the spectators became somber and glum. Reportedly, some in attendance left the grounds upon hearing the news of the fatality, some never to return.

== Aftermath ==
Widely blamed for the accident, Ed Elisian was suspended by USAC for the accident (reinstated a few days later), and was shunned by many in the racing community.

Following the accident, race officials announced that they would change the starting procedure, abandoning the single-file trip down pit lane that was used in 1957 and 1958. Also, for the 1959 Indy 500, metal roll bars welded to the frame behind the driver's head were mandated, and helmets were required to pass safety certification by Speedway medical officials.

== Box score ==
Finish	Grid	No.	Driver	Constructor	Qual	Laps	Status	Points	
Finish	Grid	No.	Driver	Constructor	Qual	Laps	Status	USAC	WDC
1	7	1	(United States) Jimmy Bryan	Salih-Offenhauser	144.18	200	133.791 mph	1000	8
2	25	99	(United States) George Amick R	Epperly-Offenhauser	142.71	200	+27.63	800	6
3	8	9	(United States) Johnny Boyd	Kurtis Kraft-Offenhauser	144.02	200	+1:09.67	700	4
4	9	33	(United States) Tony Bettenhausen	Epperly-Offenhauser	143.91	200	+1:34.81	600	4^{1}
5	20	2	(United States) Jim Rathmann	Epperly-Offenhauser	143.14	200	+1:35.62	500	2
6	3	16	(United States) Jimmy Reece	Watson-Offenhauser	145.51	200	+2:16.95	400	
7	13	26	(United States) Don Freeland	Phillips-Offenhauser	143.03	200	+2:21.06	300	
8	19	44	(United States) Jud Larson R	Watson-Offenhauser	143.51	200	+5:34.02	250	
9	26	61	(United States) Eddie Johnson	Kurtis Kraft-Offenhauser	142.67	200	+6:15.76	200	
10	33	54	(United States) Bill Cheesbourg	Kurtis Kraft-Novi	142.54	200	+8:03.59	150	
11	21	52	(United States) Al Keller	Kurtis Kraft-Offenhauser	142.93	200	+9:14.20	100	
12	6	45	(United States) Johnnie Parsons W	Kurtis Kraft-Offenhauser	144.68	200	+9:40.85	50	
13	30	19	(United States) Johnnie Tolan	Kuzma-Offenhauser	142.30	200	+9:52.24		
14	17	65	(United States) Bob Christie	Kurtis Kraft-Offenhauser	142.25	189	Spun off		
15	32	59	(United States) Dempsey Wilson R	Kuzma-Offenhauser	143.27	151	Fire		
16	12	29	(United States) A. J. Foyt R	Kuzma-Offenhauser	143.13	148	Spun off		
17	31	77	(United States) Mike Magill	Kurtis Kraft-Offenhauser	142.27	136	Disqualified		
18	14	15	(United States) Paul Russo	Kurtis Kraft-Novi	142.95	122	Radiator		
19	23	83	(United States) Shorty Templeman	Kurtis Kraft-Offenhauser	142.81	116	Brakes		
20	11	8	(United States) Rodger Ward	Lesovsky-Offenhauser	143.26	93	Magneto		
21	15	43	(United States) Billy Garrett	Kurtis Kraft-Offenhauser	142.77	80	Magneto		
22	18	88	(United States) Eddie Sachs	Kuzma-Offenhauser	144.66	68	Transmission		
23	22	7	(United States) Johnny Thomson	Kurtis Kraft-Offenhauser	142.90	52	Steering		
24	29	89	(United States) Chuck Weyant	Dunn-Offenhauser	142.60	38	Accident		
25	10	25	(United States) Jack Turner	Lesovsky-Offenhauser	143.43	21	Fuel pump		
26	4	14	(United States) Bob Veith	Kurtis Kraft-Offenhauser	144.88	1	Accident		
27	1	97	(United States) Dick Rathmann	Watson-Offenhauser	145.97	0	Accident		
28	2	5	(United States) Ed Elisian	Watson-Offenhauser	145.92	0	Accident		
29	5	4	(United States) Pat O'Connor ✝	Kurtis Kraft-Offenhauser	144.82	0	Died in crash		
30	16	31	(United States) Paul Goldsmith R	Kurtis Kraft-Offenhauser	142.74	0	Accident		
31	24	92	(United States) Jerry Unser R	Kurtis Kraft-Offenhauser	142.75	0	Accident		
32	27	68	(United States) Len Sutton R	Kurtis Kraft-Offenhauser	142.65	0	Accident		
33	28	57	(United States) Art Bisch R	Kuzma-Offenhauser	142.63	0	Accident		

W Former Indianapolis 500 winner

R Indianapolis 500 Rookie

All entrants utilized Firestone tires.

^1 – Includes 1 point for fastest lead lap

=== Race statistics ===
Lap Leaders
Laps	Leader
1–18	Jimmy Bryan
19–20	Tony Bettenhausen
21	Eddie Sachs
22–25	Tony Bettenhausen
26	Jimmy Bryan
27–30	George Amick
31	Jimmy Bryan
32–34	George Amick
35	Tony Bettenhausen
36–46	George Amick
47–48	Jimmy Bryan
49	Tony Bettenhausen
50–52	Jimmy Bryan
53–65	Tony Bettenhausen
66–104	Jimmy Bryan
105–107	Tony Bettenhausen
108–125	Johnny Boyd
126–200	Jimmy Bryan

Total laps led
Driver	Laps
Jimmy Bryan	139
Tony Bettenhausen	24
George Amick	18
Johnny Boyd	18
Eddie Sachs	1

Yellow Lights: 36 minutes, 38 seconds
Laps*	Reason
Pace lap	Field not properly aligned
1–18	Multi-car crash in turn 3 (25:00)
39-44	Chuck Weyant spin in turn 3 (5:19)
169	A. J. Foyt spin in southchute (3:18)
193-197	Bob Christie spin (3:01)
* – Approximate lap counts

== Race notes ==
- Fastest Lead Lap: Tony Bettenhausen – 1:02.370 (144.300 mph)
- Pat O'Connor had appeared on the cover of Sports Illustrated in the week leading up to the race. His subsequent death is considered an early example of the perceived "Sports Illustrated cover jinx."
- Only Appearance: George Amick (killed in 1959 USAC 100-mile race at Daytona)
- First Appearance: A. J. Foyt (First 4-time Indianapolis 500 winner.)

== Broadcasting ==
=== Radio ===
The race was carried live on the IMS Radio Network. Sid Collins served as chief announcer. The broadcast reached 302 affiliates across all 48 states, as well as Armed Forces Network and Voice of America. For the final time, a 15-minute pre-race was used. The following year, the pre-race would be expanded to 30 minutes. The broadcast featured the debut of longtime fixture Lou Palmer, who reported from the normally quiet and remote third turn. As a rookie on the network, he was assigned turn three because 'nothing ever happens there'. However, on the opening lap, Palmer was quickly thrust into duty, as his first words on the network were to describe the massive 15-car pileup and fatal accident of Pat O'Connor.

And we've got an accident here! Car #5! Car #5, the Zink Special, is the first to wreck! Another over the wall! And we've got...one, two, three, four, five...six cars, piled up here, on the northeast turn! The 54 Novi into the infield...car #19 in the infield, 68 now down into the infield...and it's almost impossible to identify the others. Out of car #5, now, is Ed Elisian...and, er, car #91 against the wall...that is all that we can see at the moment. Further down the track, there are still others. ...One car has left this track, Sid, and did go over the retaining wall. That's all of the information we can give you at the moment...we will check each car for you, and report on all of them as soon as we can. Right now, better send it to you Sid, in the tower...

Among the guests that visited the booth was Pete DePaolo.

In 2019, this entire race's radio broadcast became available as a paid digital download from the Indianapolis Motor Speedway website.

Indianapolis Motor Speedway Radio Network
Booth Announcers	Turn Reporters	Pit/garage reporters
Chief Announcer: Sid Collins; Statistician: Charlie Brockman	Turn 1: Bill Frosh; Turn 2: Bob Rhodes; Backstretch: Bernie Herman; Turn 3: Lou Palmer R Turn 4: Jim Shelton	Jack Shapiro (north); Luke Walton (center); Greg Smith (south); Bob Hoover (garages)

== World Drivers' Championship ==
1958 Indianapolis 500
Race 4 of 11 in the 1958 Formula One season
← Previous race	Next race →

Race details
- Date: May 30, 1958
- Location: Indianapolis Motor Speedway; Speedway, Indiana
- Course: Permanent racing facility
- Course length: 4.023 km (2.500 miles)
- Distance: 200 laps, 804.672 km (500.000 miles)

=== Background ===
The Indianapolis 500 was included in the FIA World Championship of Drivers from 1950 through 1960. The race was sanctioned by AAA through 1955, and then by USAC beginning in 1956. At the time the new world championship was announced and first organized by the CSI, the United States did not yet have a Grand Prix. Indianapolis Motor Speedway vice president and general manager Theodore E. "Pop" Meyers lobbied that the Indianapolis 500 be selected as the race to represent the country and to pay points towards the world championship.

Drivers competing at the Indianapolis 500 in 1950 through 1960 were credited with participation in and earned points towards the World Championship of Drivers. However, the machines competing at Indianapolis were not necessarily run to Formula One specifications and regulations. The drivers also earned separate points (on a different scale) towards the respective AAA or USAC national championships. No points, however, were awarded by the FIA towards the World Constructors' Championship.

=== Summary ===
The 1958 Indianapolis 500 was round 4 of 11 on the 1958 World Championship. The event, however, attracted little interest from any of the regular competitors on the Grand Prix circuit, particularly since it was held only four days after the Dutch Grand Prix. Juan Manuel Fangio entered with much fanfare, but withdrew when he was unable to get his car up to speed. Race winner Jimmy Bryan earned 8 points towards the World Championship. He finished 13th in the final season standings.

==== World Drivers' Championship standings after the race ====
	Pos	Driver	Points
	1	(United Kingdom) Stirling Moss	17
	2	(Italy) Luigi Musso	12
	3	(France) Maurice Trintignant	8
31	4	(United States) Jimmy Bryan	8
1	5	(United States) Harry Schell	8

- Notes: Only the top five positions are included.

==== USAC National Championship Trail standings after the race ====
Rank	Driver	Points
1	Jimmy Bryan	1000
2	George Amick	880
3	Tony Bettenhausen	760
4	Johnny Boyd	700
5	Jim Rathmann	500
5	Jimmy Reece	500

- Notes: Only the top five positions are included.

Previous race: 1958 Dutch Grand Prix	FIA Formula One World Championship; 1958 season	Next race: 1958 Belgian Grand Prix
Previous race: 1957 Indianapolis 500; Sam Hanks	1958 Indianapolis 500; Jimmy Bryan	Next race: 1959 Indianapolis 500; Rodger Ward
