= Bill Hyde =

American football player and coach

Biographical details
- Education: Samford

Playing career
- c. 1959: Itawamba
- Position: Quarterback

Coaching career (HC unless noted)
- 1962–1972: Samford (WR/DE/LB)
- 1973–1976: Delta State (DC)
- 1977–1987: North Alabama (DC)
- 1989–1991: Valdosta State (DC)
- 1992–1997: North Alabama (DC)
- 1998–2001: North Alabama

Head coaching record
- Overall: 20–21

Bill Hyde is an American former college football player and coach. He served as the head football coach at the University of North Alabama from 1998 to 2001, compiling a record of 20–21.

== Head coaching record ==
Year	Team	Overall	Conference	Standing	Bowl/playoffs
North Alabama Lions (Gulf South Conference) (1998–2001)
1998	North Alabama	8–2	7–2	T–3rd	
1999	North Alabama	5–6	5–4	5th	
2000	North Alabama	3–7	3–6	8th	
2001	North Alabama	4–6	3–6	9th	
North Alabama:		20–21	18–18		
Total:		20–21			
