= DuQuoin State Fairgrounds Racetrack =

Racetrack in DuQuoin, Illinois, U.S.

The DuQuoin "Magic Mile"
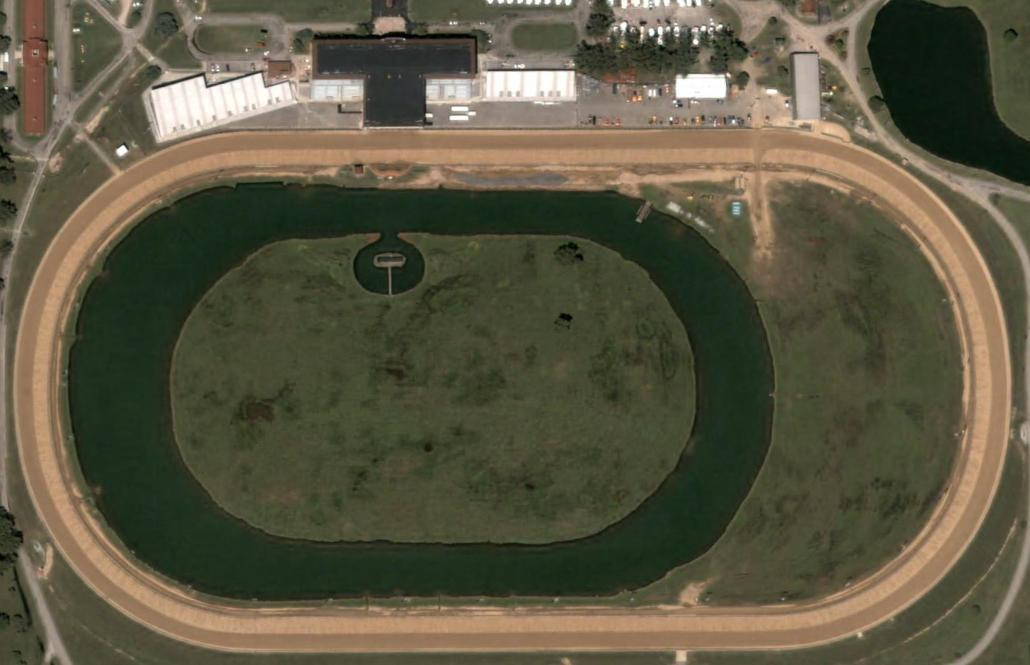
- Location: Du Quoin, Illinois
- Coordinates: 37.9828°N 89.2231°W
- Owner: State of Illinois
- Operator: Bob Sargent / Track Enterprises
- Opened: 1946; 80 years ago
- Major events: Current; ARCA Menards Series; Audubon Park 100 (1948–1949, 1950–1970, 1981–2011, 2013–2019, 2021–present); USAC Silver Crown Series; Ted Horn 100 (1948–1949, 1951–1961, 1963–2011, 2013–2019, 2021–present); American Flat Track; DuQuoin Mile (1955, 1958, 1977–1989, 1994–1998, 2001–2005, 2015–2019, 2021–present)

Oval
- Surface: Clay
- Length: 0.99 mi (1.6 km)
- Turns: 4
- Race lap record: 31.805 ( (United States) Sheldon Creed, Toyota Camry, 2018, Stock car)
- DuQuoin State Fairgrounds Racetrack
- U.S. Historic district – Contributing property
- Photo of the grandstands in 1946

- Location within Illinois Location within the United States
- Location: US 51 N of jct. with SR 14, Du Quoin, Illinois, United States
- Part of: DuQuoin State Fairgrounds (ID90000719)
- MPS: Historic Fairgrounds in Illinois MPS
- Designated CP: July 11, 1990

The DuQuoin State Fairgrounds Racetrack is a one-mile (1.6-km) clay oval motor racetrack in Du Quoin, Illinois, about 90 miles (140 km) southeast of St Louis, Missouri.

Opened in 1946, the track has hosted competitive auto racing. Since 1993, the venue is managed by Bob Sargent's Track Enterprises. It is a stop on the ARCA Menards Series, USAC Silver Crown Series and American Flat Track.

== History ==
The DuQuoin State Fair was founded in 1923 by local businessman William R. "W.R." Hayes, who owned the fair and ran it. It did not become run by the state of Illinois as a true "state fair" until the 1980s; it is now officially called the Illinois State Fair in DuQuoin, as opposed to the longtime one at state capital Springfield. At the start Hayes had a half-mile harness-racing track on his 30-acre site, with wooden grandstands that seated 3000. In 1939 Hayes started buying adjoining strip-mined land to develop its potential as parkland, replanting it and turning the strip pits into family-friendly ponds and lakes. He eventually expanded his little fairgrounds into 1200 acres.

The DuQuoin "Magic Mile" racetrack was constructed on reclaimed strip-mined land in 1946 by W.R. Hayes. The track's first national championship race was held in September 1948. In the second race on October 10, popular AAA National driving champion Ted Horn was killed in the fourth turn when a spindle on his championship car broke. The national championship race for the USAC Silver Crown dirt cars is held in his honor.

In 1957 the DuQuoin State Fairgrounds became the third longtime home of the Hambletonian, America's premier harness racing event (established 1926). The grandstands and bleachers were expanded to seat 18,000. When the Hambletonian left DuQuoin after 1980 to be raced at the Meadowlands, the Fair became the home of the World Trotting Derby. This race was held from 1981 until it was discontinued after the 2009 race. Harness racing is still a fan-favorite at the fairgrounds, and admission is free.

Music concerts are also held at the track, especially during the state fair. The stage is at center at the foot of the grandstand, backed up against the protective cyclone fence that shields the stands from the track.

== Race winners ==
=== AAA/USAC Champ Car/Silver Crown race winners ===
All winners were (United States) American

Season	Date	Winning driver	Chassis	Engine
1948	September 4	Lee Wallard	Meyer	Offy
1948	October 10	Johnnie Parsons	Kurtis	Offy
1949	September 3	Tony Bettenhausen	Kurtis	Offy
1950: Not held
1951	September 1	Tony Bettenhausen	Kurtis	Offy
1951	September 3	Tony Bettenhausen	Kurtis	Offy
1952	September 1	Chuck Stevenson	Kurtis	Offy
1953	September 7	Sam Hanks	Kurtis	Offy
1954	September 6	Sam Hanks	Kurtis	Offy
1955	September 5	Jimmy Bryan	Kuzma	Offy
1956	September 3	Jimmy Bryan	Kuzma	Offy
1957	September 2	Jud Larson	Watson	Offy
1958	September 1	Johnny Thomson	Kuzma	Offy
1959	September 7	Rodger Ward	Watson	Offy
1960	September 5	A. J. Foyt	Meskowski	Offy
1961	September 4	A. J. Foyt	Meskowski	Offy
1962: Not held - Rain
1963	September 2	A. J. Foyt	Meskowski	Offy
1964	September 7	A. J. Foyt	Meskowski	Offy
1965	September 6	Don Branson	Watson	Offy
1966	September 5	Bud Tingelstad	Meskowski	Offy
1967	September 4	A. J. Foyt	Meskowski	Offy
1968	September 2	Mario Andretti	Kuzma	Offy
1969	September 1	Al Unser	King	Ford
1970	September 7	Al Unser	King	Ford
1971	September 6	George Snider	Watson	Offenhauser
1972	September 4	A. J. Foyt	Meskowski	Offenhauser
1973	September 3	Mario Andretti	King	Ford
1974	September 2	Mario Andretti	King	Ford
1975	August 24	Tom Bigelow	Watson	Ford
1976	August 29	Bubby Jones		
1977	August 28	Tom Bigelow	Watson	
1981	August 30	Rich Vogler	Shores	Chevrolet
1982	September 6	Gary Bettenhausen	King	Chevrolet
1983	September 5	Gary Bettenhausen	King	Chevrolet
1984	September 3	Joe Saldana		
1985	September 2	Rick Hood		
1986	September 1	Jack Hewitt		
1987	September 7	Jack Hewitt		
1988	September 4	Gary Bettenhausen		
1989	September 3	Chuck Gurney		
1990	September 2	Jeff Swindell		
1991	September 1	Stevie Reeves		
1992	September 6	Johnny Parsons		
1993	September 5	Jack Hewitt		
1994	September 4	Chuck Gurney		
1995	September 3	Johnny Parsons		
1996	September 1	Chuck Gurney		
1997	August 31	Russ Gamester		
1998	September 6	Jimmy Sills		
1999	September 5	Tony Elliott		
2000	September 3	Kasey Kahne		
2001	September 2	Paul White		
2002	September 1	J. J. Yeley		
2003	August 31	Tony Elliott		
2004	September 5	J. J. Yeley		
2005	September 4	Tracy Hines		
2006	September 3	Tracy Hines		
2007	September 2	Shane Cottle		
2008	August 31	Brian Tyler		
2009	September 6	Brian Tyler		
2010	September 5	Levi Jones		
2011	September 4	Levi Jones		
2012: Not held - Rain
2013	September 1	Bobby East		
2014	August 31	Shane Cockrum		
2015	September 6	Shane Cockrum		
2016	September 3	Chris Windom		
2017	September 3	Kody Swanson		
2018	September 2	Justin Grant		
2019	September 1	Chris Windom		
2020: Not held - COVID-19 pandemic
2021	September 4	Brian Tyler		
2022	September 3	Logan Seavey		
2023	September 2	Justin Grant		
2024	August 31	Justin Grant		
2025	August 30	C. J. Leary		
2026	September 5	C. J. Leary		

== Lap records ==
As of July 2024, the fastest official race lap records at the DuQuoin State Fairground Racetrack are listed as:

Category	Time	Driver	Vehicle	Event
Oval (1946–present): 1.609 km
USAC Silver Crown	0:29.138	Tyler Walker	Silver Crown Car	2004 Ted Horn 100
AFT Singles	0:30.385	Jared Lowe	Honda CRF450R	2024 DuQuoin Mile - Main Event
ARCA Menards Series	0:31.805	Sheldon Creed	Toyota Camry	2018 General Tire Grabber 100
USAC IndyCar	0:33.950	Don Branson	Watson-Offenhauser	1964 Ted Horn Memorial/Du Quoin 100
AFT SuperTwins	0:36.032	Jared Mees	Indian FTR750	2024 DuQuoin Mile - Heat 2
