= California State Fairgrounds Race Track =

Two racing tracks in Sacramento, California, US

California State Fairgrounds
- Location: Sacramento, California
- Coordinates: 38°33′N 121°27′W
- Opened: 1906 (horse racing); 1907 (auto racing); 1968 (new track)
- Closed: 1970 (first track)
- Major events: Golden State 100; AAA/USAC National Championship

Oval
- Surface: Rice hulls
- Length: 0.99 mi (1.6 km)

Road course (1955–1969)
- Surface: Asphalt
- Length: 2.1 mi (3.4 km)
- Turns: 9

California State Fairgrounds Race Track has been the name of two dirt oval racing tracks located in Sacramento, California. The track was built in 1906 for horse racing on the site of the California Exposition. It was active for auto racing in 1907, 1912, and from 1946 until 1970. The Exposition moved to a new site north of Downtown Sacramento in 1968, and the old fairgrounds were closed and sold for development in 1970. The final day of the track was marred by tragedy when three drivers were killed in the 100-lap super-modified caged sprint car competition.

From 1949 to 1970, the track hosted the Golden State 100, a round of the AAA/USAC National Championship. The race was revived at the new Cal Expo site as a USAC Silver Crown race from 1989 until 2000. Motorcycle racing's Sacramento Mile continues to be held at the new California Exposition as part of the AMA Grand National Championship.

A 2.1-mile (3.4-km) road course was laid out in the parking lots surrounding the oval, and used for sports car racing between 1955 and 1969. It hosted a SCCA National Sports Car Championship round in 1955.

In 2026, the original race track will be turned into a college football stadium for the Sacramento State Hornets. The original stands will still be intact once play begins that fall.

== Golden State 100 winners ==
Golden State 100
AAA/USAC National Championship
- Location: Sacramento, California
- First race: 1949
- First race: 1970
- Most wins (driver): A. J. Foyt (5)
- Most wins (manufacturer): Meskowski & Watson (tied 5)

Circuit information
- Length: 1.6 km (0.99 mi)

Year	Date	Driver	Car
1949	October 30	(United States) Fred Agabashian	Kurtis-Offy
1950	October 15	(United States) Duke Dinsmore	Kurtis-Offy
1951–1952: not held
1953	October 25	(United States) Jimmy Bryan	Kurtis-Offy
1954	October 17	(United States) Jimmy Bryan	Kuzma-Offy
1955	October 16	(United States) Jimmy Bryan	Kuzma-Offy
1956	October 21	(United States) Jud Larson	Watson-Offy
1957	October 21	(United States) Rodger Ward	Lesovsky-Offy
1958	October 26	(United States) Johnny Thomson	Kuzma-Offy
1959	October 25	(United States) Jim Hurtubise	Kuzma-Offy
1960	October 30	(United States) A. J. Foyt	Meskowski-Offy
1961	October 29	(United States) Rodger Ward	Watson-Offy
1962	October 28	(United States) A. J. Foyt	Meskowski-Offy
1963	October 27	(United States) Rodger Ward	Watson-Offy
1964	October 25	(United States) A. J. Foyt	Meskowski-Offy
1965	October 24	(United States) Don Branson	Watson-Offy
1966	October 23	(United States) Dick Atkins	Watson-Offy
1967	October 1	(United States) A. J. Foyt	Meskowski-Offy
1968	September 29	(United States) A. J. Foyt	Meskowski-Offy
1969	September 28	(United States) Al Unser	King-Ford
1970	October 4	(United States) Al Unser	King-Ford

The race was revived in 1989 at the new Cal Expo mile track as a USAC Silver Crown event.

Year	Date	Driver
1989	June 4	(United States) George Snider
1990	June 3	(United States) Jimmy Sills
1991–1992: not held
1993	October 9	(United States) Jimmy Sills
1994	October 8	(United States) Jimmy Sills
1995	October 7	(United States) Donnie Beechler
1996	October 12	(United States) Donnie Beechler
1997	October 11	(United States) Dave Darland
1998	October 10	(United States) J. J. Yeley
1999	October 9	(United States) Jimmy Sills
2000	October 7	(United States) Dave Darland

== NASCAR races ==
=== NASCAR Cup Series ===
Several NASCAR Grand National Series (today's NASCAR Cup Series) races were held on the dirt oval.

NASCAR Cup Series races
Season	Date	# of racers	Winner			Track length (mi)	Race length (mi)	Purse ($USD)	Pole speed (mph)	Cautions	Caution laps	Avg. speed (mph)	Lead changes
Season	Date	# of racers	Driver	Start pos.	Car make/model	Track length (mi)	Race length (mi)	Purse ($USD)	Pole speed (mph)	Cautions	Caution laps	Avg. speed (mph)	Lead changes
1956	Jun 8	21	Lloyd Dane	15	'56 Mercury	1.000	100	4,285	76.612	–	–	74.074	–
1957	Sep 8	27	Danny Graves	1	'57 Chevrolet	1.000	100	4,075	78.007	–	–	68.663	0
1958	Sep 7	28	Parnelli Jones	1	'56 Ford	1.000	100	3,885	77.922	–	–	65.550	–
1959	Sep 13	26	Eddie Gray	19	'59 Ford	1.000	100	3,885	–	–	–	54.753	–
1960	Sep 11	23	Jim Cook	1	'60 Dodge	1.000	100	4,625	78.450	–	–	70.629	4
1961	Sep 10	32	Eddie Gray	–	'61 Ford	1.000	100	5,125	79.260	–	–	0.000	1

=== NASCAR West Series ===
Several NASCAR Pacific Coast Late Model Division/NASCAR Grand National West (today's ARCA Menards Series West) races were held on the dirt oval.

NASCAR West Series races
Season	Date	Race name	Attendance	# of racers	Winner			Track length (mi)	Race length (mi)	Purse ($USD)	Pole speed (mph)	Cautions	Caution laps	Avg. speed (mph)	Lead changes	Ref
Season	Date	Race name	Attendance	# of racers	Driver	Start pos.	Car make/model	Track length (mi)	Race length (mi)	Purse ($USD)	Pole speed (mph)	Cautions	Caution laps	Avg. speed (mph)	Lead changes	Ref
1956	Jun 8	—N/a		21	Lloyd Dane	15	'56 Mercury	1.000	100	4,285	76.612	–	–	74.074	–	
1957	Sep 8	—N/a		27	Danny Graves	1	'57 Chevrolet	1.000	100	4,075	78.007	–	–	68.663	–	
1958	Sep 7	—N/a		28	Parnelli Jones	1	'56 Ford	1.000	100	3,885	77.922	–	–	65.550	–	
1959	Sep 13	—N/a		26	Eddie Gray	19	'59 Ford	1.000	100	3,885	–	–	–	54.753	–	
1960	Sep 11	—N/a		23	Jim Cook	1	'60 Dodge	1.000	100	4,625	78.450	–	–	70.629	4	
1961	Sep 10	—N/a		32	Eddie Gray	–	'61 Ford	1.000	100	5,125	79.260	–	–	–	1	
1962	Sep 9	—N/a		25	Eddie Gray	–	'62 Ford	1.000	100	–	–	7	–	63.818	–	
1963	Sep 8	—N/a		22	Bob Ross	–	'63 Mercury	1.000	100	–	–	–	–	76.384	–	
1964	Oct 04	Sacramento 100	8,500	24	Bob Ross	1	'64 Mercury	1.000	100	6,000	85.653	2	–	68.182	–	
1965	Oct 03	California 100		26	Bill Amick	1	'64 Mercury	1.000	100	6,000	82.286	1	6	75.538	2	
1966	Oct 9	11th Annual California 100	5,860	25	Don Noel	5	'64 Ford	1.000	100	6,000	85.714	4	15	62.915	2	
1969	Apr 27	Sacramento 100	5,000	28	Marty Kinerk	10	'67 Chevrolet	1.000	100	7,500	89.021	6	23	78.880	4	
1970	May 10	Sacramento 100	4,235	28	Tiny Lund	1	'69 Ford	1.000	100	5,250	90.475	3	11	85.633	5	
