= Lakewood Speedway =

Defunct US raceway

Indianapolis of the South
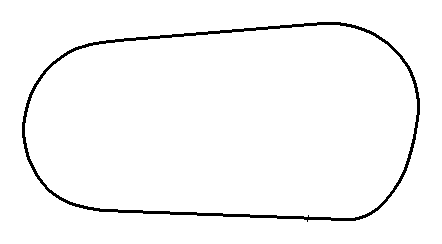
- Location: Atlanta, Georgia
- Coordinates: 33.702°N 84.390°W
- Broke ground: 1916
- Opened: July 4, 1917
- Closed: September 3, 1979
- Major events: NASCAR, AAA, IMCA

oval
- Surface: dirt
- Length: 0.99 mi (1.6 km)

Lakewood Speedway was a race track located south of Atlanta, Georgia, in Lakewood, just north of the eastern arm of Langford Parkway (formerly Lakewood Freeway). The track held many kinds of races between 1919 and 1979, including events sanctioned by AAA/USAC, IMCA, and NASCAR. It was a one-mile (1.6 km) dirt track which was located adjacent to Lakewood Fairgrounds. Lakewood Speedway was considered the "Indianapolis of the South" as it was located in the largest city in the Southern United States and it held an annual race of the Indy cars.

== History ==
In 1916, Atlanta officials chose the Lakewood Fairgrounds as the site for agricultural fairs. They built a one-mile (1.6 km) horse racing track around a lake at the fairgrounds. The first events were held at the track on July 4, 1917. The feature events were a horse race and motorcycle race, before 23,000 spectators. A first automobile race was held at the track later that year; it featured Barney Oldfield in a match race against Ralph DePalma which attracted 15,000 spectators. In the 1920s and 1930s, the International Motor Contest Association (IMCA) held car racing events during fairs and the American Automobile Association (AAA)/USAC held an annual event on July 4. By 1938, the track was hosting races with champ cars, horses, midgets, modifieds, motorcycles, and boats (in the infield lake). The Atlantic States Racing Association, Central States Auto Racing Association, Gulf States Automobile Association, International Stock Car Racing Association, and Motor Internationale Association all sanctioned events at the track. The track closed in 1941, like all United States racetracks, because the U.S. government banned all automobile racing to conserve materials during World War II. Racing resumed after the war; Lakewood became the premier track on the National Stock Car Racing Association circuit. Following the NSCRA's folding, NASCAR held its first race at the track in 1951. It held eleven Grand National Series and two Convertible division races in the 1950s.

Atlanta Motor Speedway opened 20 miles south of Atlanta in 1960. The new 1.5-mile (2.4 km) took away the NASCAR dates and began draining on Lakewood's appeal. Lakewood was resurfaced in 1967.

Evel Knievel made an appearance at Lakewood Speedway in 1972. He was scheduled to make a jump, but had injured his back the week before. After another stuntman, Wicked Ward, performed the motorcycle jump, Evel Knievel was brought to the track in an ambulance, where he was lifted onto his motorcycle by four assistants. He then drove up and down the track, popping wheelies for the crowd.

The track fell into disuse in the late 1970s. It officially closed on September 3, 1979 with Buck Simmons winning the final race ever held there, it was then allowed to be overgrown with grass and bushes. Monthly flea markets and a few concerts were held at the exhibition halls on the fairgrounds. As of 2008, the grandstand is still standing, but the third and fourth turns of the racetrack are covered by the back parking lot for Lakewood Amphitheatre. A road crosses the turn two, and the frontstretch was paved to become an access road to Lakewood Avenue. Most of the lake has been filled.

== Deaths at Lakewood Speedway ==
Most of the infield was the lake, which made the track dangerous when drivers made a mistake. The turns at each end of the track had different radii, like Darlington Speedway has today. Several drivers died in crashes at the speedway.

George Robson and George Barringer died in a four-car crash on the second last lap at a Champ car race on September 2, 1946. Billy De Vore was attempting to finish the race at a slow pace after he had engine problems when Robson crashed into his car. Robson was unable to see De Vore's car until it was too late because the dust in the air caused limited visibility. De Vore's car was pushed over a stone wall. Robson's car was hit by Barringer and Bud Bardowski's cars. Only nine cars were running at the time of the accident. Robson and Barringer died shortly after arriving at an area hospital. Race leader Ted Horn saw the crash; he futilely attempted to flag down the other drivers. Horn was declared the race winner.

Skimp Hersey received severe burns in a stock car crash at Lakewood Park Speedway on June 11, 1950. He died the next day.

Frank Luptow of Tampa, Florida died when the axle on his stock car broke causing it to flip over, crushing him in the process.

Art Bisch died two days after sustaining head and chest injuries when his Champ Car smashed into the guardrail and rolled over twice in a USAC Champ car race held on July 4, 1958.

== Notable races ==
Richard Petty took the checkered flag to win his first NASCAR Grand National race at the track in 1959. Second place finisher Lee Petty (Richard's father and car owner) protested the result, asking for a recount of the race's scorecards. NASCAR official recounted the scorecards and awarded the win to Lee Petty. Richard Petty went on to win 200 races.

Gober Sosebee began his career in 1940 at the Speedway. Johnny Beauchamp recorded his first NASCAR victory at Lakewood Speedway in 1959. Curtis Turner, racing for Holman Moody raced 1959 Thunderbirds and won races at Lakewood Speedway. Bill Blair drove a 1952 Oldsmobile owned by George Hutchens to his second win at Lakewood Speedway on April 20, 1952. His final race was at Lakewood in 1958.

== Lakewood Speedway in the movies ==
Lakewood Speedway was featured prominently in a few different movies. Scenes from the 1977 Burt Reynolds film, Smokey and the Bandit were staged at Lakewood.

== Race results ==
=== NASCAR ===
Results in the Grand National Series

Date	Winner
November 11, 1951	Tim Flock
April 20, 1952	Bill Blair
November 16, 1952	Donald Thomas
July 12, 1953	Herb Thomas
November 1, 1953	Buck Baker
March 21, 1954	Herb Thomas
March 25, 1956	Buck Baker
April 13, 1958	Curtis Turner
October 26, 1958	Junior Johnson
March 22, 1959	Johnny Beauchamp
June 14, 1959	Lee Petty

Results in the NASCAR Convertible Division

Date	Winner
September 2, 1956	Joe Weatherly
May 18, 1958	Fireball Roberts

Results for the short-lived NASCAR Speedway Division (open-wheel)

Year	Date	Race name	Winner	Car
1952	June 8	Atlanta 100	Al Keller	Cadillac

=== AAA/USAC Championship Car ===
Year	Date	Race name	Winner	Chassis	Engine
1946	March 31	Mike Benton Sweepstakes (non-points)	Jimmy Wilburn		Offy
1946	June 2	Lakewood Race 1	Ted Horn		Offy
1946	July 4	Lakewood Race 2	Ted Horn	Wetteroth	Offy
1946	July 7	Lakewood Race 3	Ted Horn		Offy
1946	September 2	Atlanta 100	George Connor	Kurtis Kraft	Offy
1946	September 28	Lakewood Race 5	Ted Horn		Offy
1946	October 5	Lakewood Race 6	Bill Holland		Offy
1947	July 4	Atlanta 100	Walt Ader	Adams	Offy
1948	September 6	Atlanta 100	Mel Hansen	Wetteroth	Offy
1956	July 14	Atlanta 100	Eddie Sachs	Hillegass	Offy
1957	July 4	Atlanta 100	George Amick	Lesovsky	Offy
1958	July 4	Atlanta 100	Jud Larson	Watson	Offy
