= 1959 USAC Championship Car season =

Sports season

- USAC National Championship Trail

Season
- Races: 13
- Start date: April 4
- End date: October 25

Awards
- National champion: (United States) Rodger Ward
- Indianapolis 500 winner: (United States) Rodger Ward

The 1959 USAC Championship Car season (officially the 1959 USAC National Championship Trail) consisted of 13 races, beginning in Daytona Beach, Florida on April 4 and concluding in Sacramento, California on October 25. There were also three non-championship events. The USAC National Champion and Indianapolis 500 winner was Rodger Ward. In this season, seven fatal accidents occurred. During the pre-season, Marshall Teague was fatally injured in a crash at Daytona. He was 37 years old.

In the first race of the season at Daytona, 34-year-old George Amick was killed in an accident on the last lap. In the second race of the season at Trenton, Dick Linder was killed; he was 36 years old. The third race of the season, the Indy 500, had two fatalities. On May 2, Jerry Unser (26 years old) and on May 19, Bob Cortner (32 years old) were both killed in practice accidents. On July 19 at Mechanicsburg in the Indianapolis Sweepstakes non-championship race Van Johnson was killed in an accident; he was 32 years old. On August 30, 32-year-old Ed Elisian was killed at the Milwaukee Mile.

== Schedule and results ==
Rnd	Date	Race name	Track	Location	Type	Pole position	Winning driver
1	April 4	(United States) Daytona 100	Daytona International Speedway	Daytona Beach, Florida	Paved	(United States) Dick Rathmann	(United States) Jim Rathmann
NC	April 4	(United States) USAC/FIA Formula Libre Race	Daytona International Speedway	Daytona Beach, Florida	Paved	(United States) Dick Rathmann	(United States) Jim Rathmann
2	April 19	(United States) Race of Champions	Trenton International Speedway	Trenton, New Jersey	Paved	(United States) Don Branson	(United States) Tony Bettenhausen
3	May 30	(United States) International 500 Mile Sweepstakes^{A}	Indianapolis Motor Speedway	Speedway, Indiana	Paved	(United States) Johnny Thomson	(United States) Rodger Ward
4	June 7	(United States) Rex Mays Classic	Milwaukee Mile	West Allis, Wisconsin	Paved	(United States) Johnny Thomson	(United States) Johnny Thomson
5	June 14	(United States) Langhorne 100	Langhorne Speedway	Langhorne, Pennsylvania	Dirt	(United States) Jud Larson	(United States) Van Johnson
NC	July 4	(United States) Pikes Peak Auto Hill Climb	Pikes Peak Highway	Pikes Peak, Colorado	Hill	(United States) Slim Roberts^{B}	(United States) Bobby Unser
C	July 4	(United States) Daytona	Daytona International Speedway	Daytona Beach, Florida	Paved	Cancelled	
NC	July 19	(United States) Indianapolis Sweepstakes	Williams Grove Speedway	Mechanicsburg, Pennsylvania	Dirt	(United States) Rodger Ward	(United States) Rodger Ward
6	August 22	(United States) Springfield 100	Illinois State Fairgrounds	Springfield, Illinois	Dirt	(United States) Don Branson	(United States) Len Sutton
7	August 30	(United States) Milwaukee 200	Milwaukee Mile	West Allis, Wisconsin	Paved	(United States) Shorty Templeman	(United States) Rodger Ward
8	September 7	(United States) Ted Horn Memorial	DuQuoin State Fairgrounds	Du Quoin, Illinois	Dirt	(United States) Don Branson	(United States) Rodger Ward
9	September 12	(United States) Syracuse 100	Syracuse Mile	Syracuse, New York	Dirt	(United States) Johnny Thomson	(United States) Eddie Sachs
10	September 19	(United States) Hoosier Hundred	Indiana State Fairgrounds	Indianapolis, Indiana	Dirt	(United States) Rodger Ward	(United States) Rodger Ward
11	September 27	(United States) Trenton 100	Trenton International Speedway	Trenton, New Jersey	Paved	(United States) Eddie Sachs	(United States) Eddie Sachs
12	October 18	(United States) Bobby Ball Memorial	Arizona State Fairgrounds	Phoenix, Arizona	Dirt	(United States) Lloyd Ruby	(United States) Tony Bettenhausen
13	October 25	(United States) Golden State 100	California State Fairgrounds	Sacramento, California	Dirt	(United States) Wayne Weiler	(United States) Jim Hurtubise

Paved/Dirt Oval
Road Course/Hill Climb
Non-championship race

^A Indianapolis 500 was USAC-sanctioned and counted towards the 1959 FIA World Championship of Drivers title.
^B No pole is awarded for the Pikes Peak Hill Climb, in this schedule on the pole is the driver who started first. No lap led was awarded for the Pikes Peak Hill Climb, however, a lap was awarded to the drivers that completed the climb.

== Final points standings ==
Note: At the Milwaukee 200 started with the car #16 Jim Rathmann, after 29 lap the relieved driver A. J. Foyt led the car the remaining 171 lap and finished 4, so the car completed the 200 lap. The points for this place was 240 points, Jim Rathmann received 34.8 points and A. J. Foyt received 205.2 points; because the method: (the points for the finish place) / (number the lap when completed the car) * (number the lap when completed the driver).

Pos	Driver	DAY (United States)	TRE1 (United States)	INDY (United States)	MIL1 (United States)	LHS (United States)	SPR (United States)	MIL2 (United States)	DQSF (United States)	SYR (United States)	ISF (United States)	TRE2 (United States)	ASF (United States)	CSF (United States)	Pts
1	(United States) Rodger Ward	2	2	1	13		18	1	1	3	**1**	18	3	17	2400
2	(United States) Tony Bettenhausen	18	1	4	17	17	17	16	3	6	15	2	1	8	1430
3	(United States) Johnny Thomson	7	20	**3**	**1**	DNQ	4	2	16	**16**	Wth				1400
4	(United States) Jim Rathmann	1	4	2	DNQ			4							1154.8
5	(United States) A. J. Foyt	8	DNQ	10	3	13	15	25	DNQ	9	3	19	2	DNS	910.2
6	(United States) Eddie Sachs	19	19	17	7	18	7	10	18	1	2	**1**	DNQ	10	797
7	(United States) Don Branson	11	**13**	24	9	9	**2**		**2**	2	17	5	5	15	780
8	(United States) Johnny Boyd			6	2			5			DNQ				760
9	(United States) Len Sutton	20	16	32	10	14	1	19	4	8	5	22	16	11	520
10	(United States) Paul Goldsmith			5	22	DNQ									500
11	(United States) Don Freeland			22	8	8	9	3	15	17	7				480
12	(United States) Bobby Grim		7	26	11	16	16	26	5	5	6	9	6	DNQ	480
13	(United States) Gene Force		12	DNQ	20			14	DNQ	7	14	4	4	3	450
14	(United States) Jim McWithey			16	DNQ	DNQ	14	DNQ	9	4	4	8	17	4	450
15	(United States) Eddie Johnson			8				23				3			390
16	(United States) Dick Rathmann	**5**	DNP	20	DNQ	7	6	7	12	DNP	DNQ				370
17	(United States) Bob Veith	DNQ	DNP	12	6	10	8	9	8					18	340
18	(United States) Duane Carter			7	DNQ	DNP	12								310
19	(United States) Al Keller	13	DNP	18	5		3	DNQ	7						300
20	(United States) Jud Larson	16		29	4	**2**	DNS					DNP			280
21	(United States) Jim Hurtubise RY										16	7	DNQ	1	260
22	(United States) Shorty Templeman			DNQ	DNQ			**11**	17	13	12	6	9	6	250
23	(United States) Jack Turner			27	12			6	6	DNQ	DNQ			DNQ	250
24	(United States) Ed Elisian				15	3	5	22							240
25	(United States) Elmer George	6	6	DNQ	DNQ	5									233
26	(United States) Van Johnson		10	DNQ		1									230
27	(United States) Paul Russo	DNQ		9	DNQ			DNQ							200
28	(United States) Wayne Weiler			DNQ	DNQ		10	12	14		DNQ	11	7	**7**	190
29	(United States) Chuck Weyant			28	DNQ	12	11	8	11	11	DNQ				170
30	(United States) Bill Homeier			DNQ		DNQ	DNQ	DNP	DNQ	10	9		11	5	165
31	(United States) Al Farmer R							DNQ	DNQ	DNQ	DNQ	20	DNQ	2	160
32	(United States) Jimmy Davies	15	3	DNQ		DNQ	DNQ			DNQ		15			140
33	(United States) Bob Christie	3	15	25	DNQ										140
34	(United States) Ralph Liguori			DNQ		6	DNQ	DNQ		DNQ	8	17			130
35	(United States) Rex Easton			DNQ		4									120
36	(United States) George Amick	4													120
37	(United States) Jim Packard	10	11	DNQ	14	11	13	20	DNQ	15	18	21	8	DNQ	120
38	(United States) Chuck Arnold R	DNQ	5	15	DNQ	DNQ		18		DNQ	DNQ	13			100
39	(United States) Gene Hartley			11	DNQ			24							100
40	(United States) Bill Cheesbourg	12	DNQ	21	21	DNQ	DNQ	21	10	12	DNQ	10	DNQ	DNQ	80
41	(United States) Jerry Unser	DNQ	8	DNQ											50
42	(United States) Joe Barzda		9		16	DNQ									40
43	(United States) Pat Flaherty	9	17	19	19										40
44	(United States) Bill Hyde R												DNQ	9	40
45	(United States) Buddy Cagle				18	DNP					10	DNQ			30
46	(United States) Jack Rounds R												10	DNQ	30
47	(United States) Lee Drollinger R						DNQ		DNQ		11	DNQ	13	DNQ	20
48	(United States) Dempsey Wilson	17			DNQ	15	DNQ	13			DNQ		12	16	10
49	(United States) Johnny Tolan			DNQ	DNQ								DNQ	12	10
50	(United States) Len Duncan											12			10
-	(United States) Lloyd Ruby						DNQ	DNQ	13	14	13		**18**	DNQ	0
-	(United States) Chuck Hulse												DNQ	13	0
-	(United States) Al Herman			13											0
-	(United States) Bob Cleberg R												14	14	0
-	(Canada) Bob McLean R							17				14			0
-	(United States) Jimmy Daywalt			14	DNQ										0
-	(United States) Bill Randall	14													0
-	(United States) Dick Linder		14												0
-	(United States) Russ Congdon R			DNQ				15	DNQ		DNQ				0
-	(United States) Gig Stephens R											15			0
-	(United States) Tony Bonadies		21									16			0
-	(United States) Bob Schroeder		18	DNQ											0
-	(United States) Johnny Kay									18					0
-	(United States) Ray Crawford			23											0
-	(United States) Mike Magill	DNQ		30											0
-	(United States) Red Amick R			31	DNQ			DNQ							0
-	(United States) Jimmy Bryan			33											0
-	(United States) Johnny Moorhouse			DNQ									DNQ	DNS	0
-	(United States) Bob Wente						DNQ	DNS							0
-	(United States) Bob Said	DNS													0
-	(United States) Leon Clum								DNQ	DNQ	DNQ	DNQ			0
-	(United States) Herb Hill						DNQ	DNQ			DNQ			DNQ	0
-	(United States) Chuck Rodee			DNQ			DNQ	DNQ							0
-	(United States) Earl Motter			DNQ									DNQ	DNQ	0
-	(United States) Don Davis												DNQ	DNQ	0
-	(United States) Norm Hall												DNQ	DNQ	0
-	(United States) Bob Cortner			DNQ											0
-	(United States) Chuck Daigh			DNQ											0
-	(United States) Don Edmunds			DNQ											0
-	(United States) Jack Ensley			DNQ											0
-	(United States) Andy Furci			DNQ											0
-	(United States) Eddie Russo			DNQ											0
-	(United States) George Morris											DNQ			0
-	(United States) Johnny Wood												DNQ		0
-	(United States) Ernie Koch													DNQ	0
-	(United States) Johnnie Parsons			DNP											0
Pos	Driver	DAY (United States)	TRE1 (United States)	INDY (United States)	MIL1 (United States)	LHS (United States)	SPR (United States)	MIL2 (United States)	DQSF (United States)	SYR (United States)	ISF (United States)	TRE2 (United States)	ASF (United States)	CSF (United States)	Pts

Color	Result
Gold	Winner
Silver	2nd place
Bronze	3rd place
Green	4th & 5th place
Light Blue	6th-10th place
Dark Blue	Finished (Outside Top 10)
Purple	Did not finish (Ret)
Red	Did not qualify (DNQ)
Brown	Withdrawn (Wth)
Black	Disqualified (DSQ)
White	Did not start (DNS)
Blank	Did not participate (DNP)
Blank	Not competing

**In-line notation**
**Bold**	Pole position
Italics	Ran fastest race lap
*	Led most race laps
RY Rookie of the Year
R Rookie

== See also ==
- 1959 Indianapolis 500
