= Don Edmunds =

American racecar driver (1930–2020)

- Born: September 23, 1930; Santa Ana, California, U.S.
- Died: August 11, 2020 (aged 89)

Formula One World Championship career
- Nationality: (United States) American
- Active years: 1957, 1959
- Team(s): Kuzma, Kurtis Kraft
- Entries: 2 (1 start)
- Championships: 0
- Wins: 0
- Podiums: 0
- Career points: 0
- Pole positions: 0
- Fastest laps: 0
- First entry: 1957 Indianapolis 500
- Last entry: 1959 Indianapolis 500

Don Edmunds (September 23, 1930 – August 11, 2020) was an American racecar driver and car builder.

== Racing career ==
Edmunds changed the nose on his first Kurtis midget car from Kurtis' design to his own. Indy car builder Eddie Kuzma hired Edmunds to fix the dent in Jimmy Bryan’s car after the driver kicked the car.

Edmunds had his first start at Indianapolis Motor Speedway in 1957. He won the 1957 Indianapolis 500 Rookie of the Year after finishing nineteenth over Bill Cheesbourg, Elmer George, Mike Magill, and Eddie Sachs. Edmunds' Indy career ended with a serious practice accident at the Speedway in 1958.

Edmunds founded Autoresearch, Inc. in Anaheim, California, which specialized in building midget cars and sprint cars. He created the blueprints and did most of the fabrication work on the original Bill Thomas Cheetah prototype sports car racer. His chassis won several National Midget Championships in the late 1960s and early 1970s. In the 1970s, Edmunds was a prolific constructor of Formula Super Vee cars. He became a collector and restorer of old race cars.

Edmunds built Evel Knievel's Snake River Canyon Sky cycle.

== Career awards ==
- Edmunds was named to the National Sprint Car Hall of Fame in 1991.
- Edmunds was inducted in the National Midget Auto Racing Hall of Fame in 1994.

== Death ==
Born in Santa Ana, California, Edmunds died in August 2020, aged 89 in Gold Beach, OR.

== Indianapolis 500 results ==
Year	Car	Start	Qual	Rank	Finish	Laps	Led	Retired
1957	92	27	140.449	23	19	170	0	Spun T4
Totals						170	0	

Starts	1
Poles	0
Front Row	0
Wins	0
Top 5	0
Top 10	0
Retired	1

== Complete Formula One World Championship results ==
(key)

Year	Entrant	Chassis	Engine	1	2	3	4	5	6	7	8	9	WDC	Points
1957	Roy McKay	Kurtis Kraft 500G	Offenhauser L4	ARG	MON	500; 19	FRA	GBR	GER	PES	ITA		NC	0
1959	Bill Forbes Racing	Kuzma Indy Roadster	Offenhauser L4	MON	500; DNQ	NED	FRA	GBR	GER	POR	ITA	USA	NC	0

Sporting positions
Preceded by Bob Veith	Indianapolis 500; Rookie of the Year; 1957	Succeeded by George Amick
