= George Constantine (racing driver) =

American racing driver (1918–1968)

- Born: George John Constantine; February 22, 1918 Southbridge, Massachusetts, U.S.
- Died: January 7, 1968 (aged 49) New York, New York, U.S.

Formula One World Championship career
- Nationality: (United States) American
- Active years: 1959
- Team: Cooper
- Entries: 1
- Championships: 0
- Wins: 0
- Podiums: 0
- Career points: 0
- Pole positions: 0
- Fastest laps: 0
- First entry: 1959 United States Grand Prix

George John Constantine (February 22, 1918 – January 7, 1968) was a racing driver from the United States. He competed nationally in 108 races between 1953 and 1962, winning 17 times.

Constantine was the United States Sports Car Driver of the Year in 1960. He won the 1959 Nassau Trophy race and the 1956 grand prix at Watkins Glen (in a Jaguar D-type). He set course records at Lime Rock, (1:05.81), and Marlboro, in 1958, and he was one of the top-rated competitors in the 1959 Daytona, Fla. international speedway race.

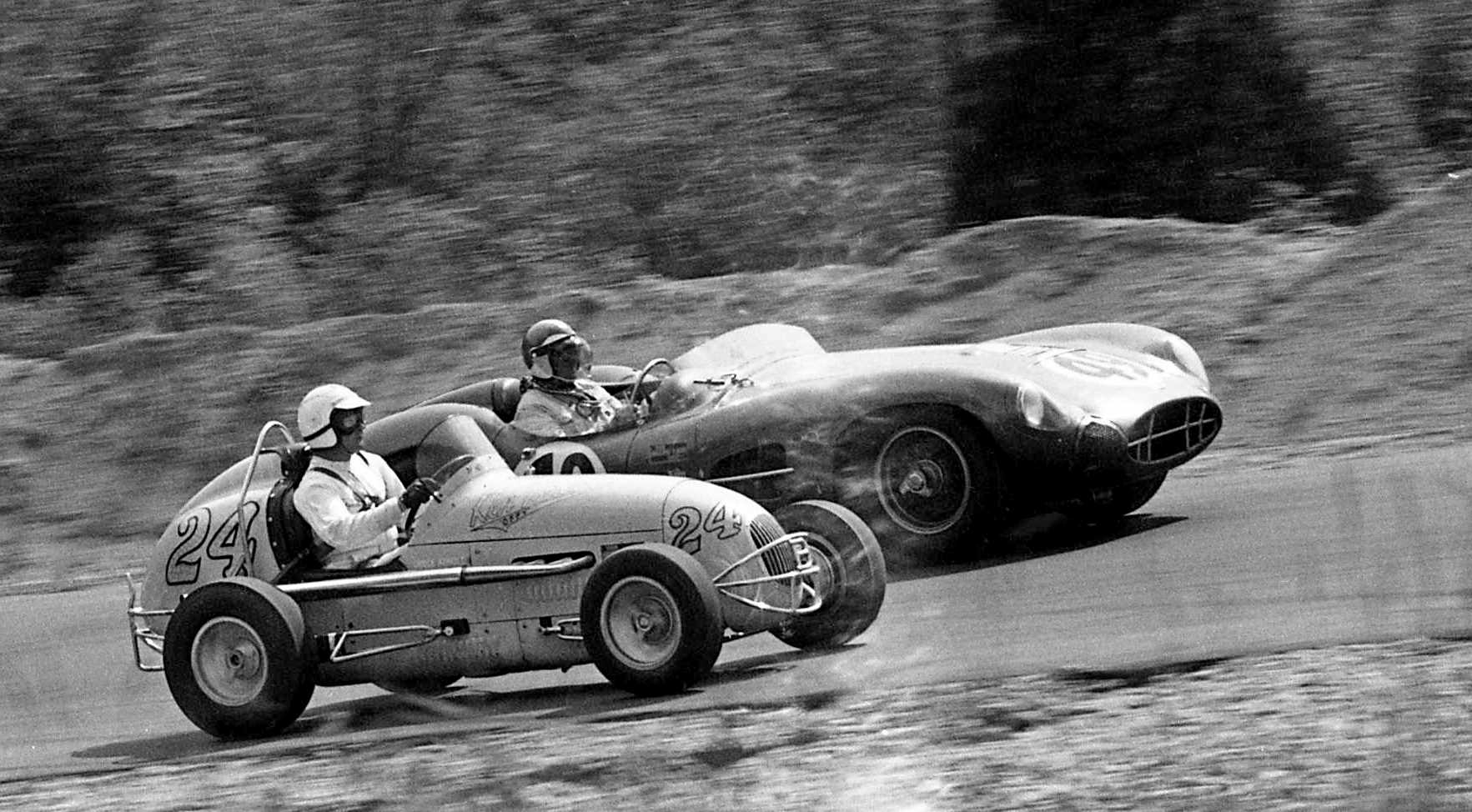
Constantine battling Rodger Ward (24) at Lime Rock

Constantine was known as the "King of Lime Rock" and "The Flying Greek." His most successful car was the Aston Martin DBR2/1, owned by Elisha Walker, Jr., and his mechanic was Rex Woodgate.

== Complete Formula One results ==
(key)

Year	Entrant	Chassis	Engine	1.	2	3	4	5	6	7	8	9	WDC	Points
1959	Mike Taylor	Cooper T45	Coventry Climax	MON	500	NED	FRA	GBR	GER	POR	ITA	USA; Ret	NC	0
