= Jean Lucienbonnet =

French racing driver (1923–1962)

- Born: 7 January 1923; Nice, France
- Died: 19 August 1962 (aged 39); Enna-Pergusa, Sicily, Italy

Formula One World Championship career
- Nationality: (France) French
- Active years: 1959
- Team: privateer Cooper
- Entries: 1 (0 starts)
- Championships: 0
- Wins: 0
- Podiums: 0
- Career points: 0
- Pole positions: 0
- Fastest laps: 0
- First entry: 1959 Monaco Grand Prix

Jean Lucienbonnet (born Lucien Jean Bonnet, January 7, 1923 – died August 19, 1962) was a racing driver from France, racing and rallying in various series. His single Formula One World Championship entry was the 1959 Monaco Grand Prix with his Cooper T45, but he failed to qualify. He was killed in a Formula Junior race in Sicily in 1962.

== Complete Formula One World Championship results ==
(key)

Year	Entrant	Chassis	Engine	1	2	3	4	5	6	7	8	9	WDC	Points
1959	Jean Lucienbonnet	Cooper T45 (F2)	Climax Straight-4	MON; DNQ	500	NED	FRA	GBR	GER	POR	ITA	USA	NC	0
