= Phil Cade =

American racing driver (1916–2001)

- Born: June 12, 1916; Charles City, Iowa, U.S.
- Died: August 28, 2001 (aged 85); Winchester, Massachusetts, U.S.

Formula One World Championship career
- Nationality: (United States) American
- Active years: 1959
- Team: non-works Maserati
- Entries: 1 (0 starts)
- First entry: 1959 United States Grand Prix
- Last entry: 1959 United States Grand Prix

Philip Joseph "Phil" Cade (June 12, 1916 – August 28, 2001) was an American amateur auto racer.

== Career ==
Born in Charles City, Iowa, Cade owned and raced a Maserati 250F and Maserati V8RI. He entered the 1959 United States Grand Prix with his 250F, and though he qualified, was unable to start the race because "his car's engine expired". Though he stopped regularly racing in 1962, he kept the 250F until 1988, and was still occasionally racing the V8RI into the 1990s.

== Death ==
Cade died on August 28, 2001, in Winchester, Massachusetts.

== Complete Formula One results ==
(key)

Year	Entrant	Chassis	Engine	1	2	3	4	5	6	7	8	9	WDC	Points
1959	Phil Cade	Maserati 250F	Maserati Straight-6	MON	500	NED	FRA	GBR	GER	POR	ITA	USA; DNS	NC	0
