= Jerry Unser Jr. =

American racing driver (1932–1959)

Jerry Unser
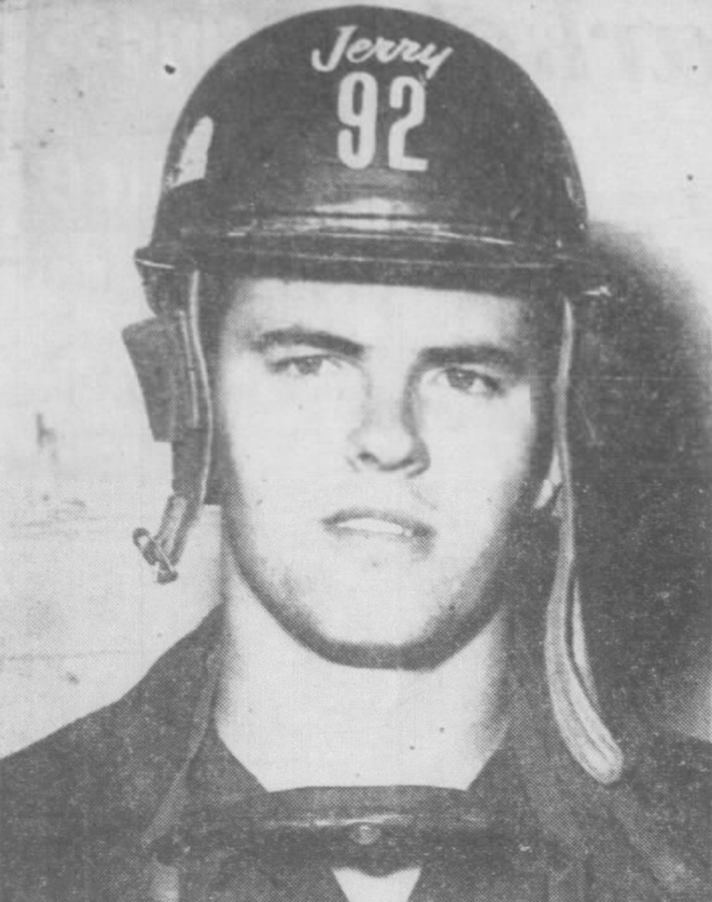
- Unser in 1953
- Born: Jeremy Michael Unser Jr. November 15, 1932 Colorado Springs, Colorado, U.S.
- Died: May 17, 1959 (aged 26) Indianapolis, Indiana, U.S.

Championship titles
- USAC Stock Car (1957)

AAA/USAC Stock Car career
- Years active: 1956–1958
- Championships: 1
- Best finish: 1st in 1957

Champ Car career
- 3 races run over 3 years
- Best finish: 28th (1955)
- First race: 1955 Pikes Peak Hill Climb (Pikes Peak)
- Last race: 1959 Race of Champions (Trenton)
Wins	Podiums	Poles
0	0	0

Formula One World Championship career
- Active years: 1958–1959
- Team(s): Kurtis Kraft, Kuzma
- Entries: 2 (1 start)
- Championships: 0
- Wins: 0
- Podiums: 0
- Career points: 0
- Pole positions: 0
- Fastest laps: 0
- First entry: 1958 Indianapolis 500

Jeremy Michael Unser Jr. (November 15, 1932 – May 17, 1959) was an American racecar driver. He was the 1957 USAC Stock Car champion.

Jerry was the first of the Unser family to compete at Indianapolis. In his only start, in 1958, he was caught up in a 13-car pileup on the first lap and flew over the turn three wall, emerging unhurt. He died in a practice crash before the 1959 Indianapolis 500, leaving behind a widow, Jeanne Unser, and two sons, Jerry and Johnny Unser.

Unser's brothers Al and Bobby and his nephew Al Jr. have won the "500". His son Johnny and nephew Robby have also competed in the race.

== Death ==
On May 2, 1959, on the second day of practice for the 1959 Indianapolis 500, Unser lost control of his car coming out of turn 4 on a practice lap. The car hit the wall after spinning, then went end over end down the front straightaway, leaving behind a trail of parts. The car burst into flames as a result. Track officials estimated his speed just before the accident to be about 133 mph. He was conscious during his rescue, yelling "My legs are on fire. Call my wife." Before he could be pulled from the vehicle, the fire had to be put out. Unser was taken to Methodist Hospital with a broken neck and third degree burns over both legs and one arm. In critical condition, he suffered burns over 35 percent of his body, and was in a coma. Unser died from his injuries and pneumonia two weeks later on May 17, 1959. Following the accident, it became mandatory for drivers to wear fire-resistant driving suits. Most drivers already wore the suits, but some drivers at the time wore t-shirts.

== Indianapolis 500 results ==
Year	Car	Start	Qual	Rank	Finish	Laps	Led	Retired
1958	92	24	142.755	23	31	0	0	Crash T3
Totals						0	0	

Starts	1
Poles	0
Front row	0
Wins	0
Top 5	0
Top 10	0
Retired	1

== World Championship career summary ==
The Indianapolis 500 was part of the FIA World Championship from 1950 through 1960. Drivers competing at Indy during those years were credited with World Championship points and participation. Unser participated in one World Championship race but scored no World Championship points.

=== Complete Formula One World Championship results ===
(key) (Races in italics indicate fastest lap)

Year	Chassis	Engine	1	2	3	4	5	6	7	8	9	10	11	WDC	Points
1958	Kurtis Kraft	Offenhauser L4	ARG	MON	NED	500; 31	BEL	FRA	GBR	GER	POR	ITA	MOR	NC	0
1959	Kuzma	Offenhauser L4	MON	500; DNQ	NED	FRA	GBR	GER	POR	ITA	USA			NC	0

Sporting positions
Preceded by Johnny Mantz	USAC Stock Car Champion; 1957	Succeeded by Fred Lorenzen

Preceded by Stuart Lewis-Evans	Formula One fatal accidents May 17, 1959	Succeeded by Bob Cortner
