= Mike Taylor (racing driver) =

British racing driver (1934–2017)

Michael Taylor
- Born: 24 April 1934; Westminster, London, England
- Died: 4 April 2017 (aged 82); Belgravia, London, England

Formula One World Championship career
- Nationality: (United Kingdom) British
- Active years: 1959 – 1960
- Team(s): privateer Cooper, Lotus
- Entries: 2 (1 start)
- Championships: 0
- Wins: 0
- Podiums: 0
- Career points: 0
- Pole positions: 0
- Fastest laps: 0
- First entry: 1959 British Grand Prix
- Last entry: 1960 Belgian Grand Prix

Michael John Clifford Taylor (24 April 1934 – 4 April 2017) was a British racing driver. He participated in two Formula One World Championship Grands Prix, debuting on 18 July 1959. He scored no championship points. He also participated in several non-Championship Formula One races. His racing career effectively ended when his steering column weld failed on his Lotus 18 in the 1960 Belgian Grand Prix at 160 mph (260 km/h). He was thrown from the car, cutting down a tree with his body and broke several bones (Alan Stacey and Chris Bristow were killed and Stirling Moss was also injured at the event, crashing his Lotus 18 in practice). He was paralysed, but after therapy was able to regain the ability to walk.

Because of his car failure, Taylor later sued Lotus successfully, one of the few successful actions against the makers of a racing car.

After his accident, Taylor sporadically competed in long distance rallying, finishing third in the London–Sydney Marathon in 1977 in a Citroën CX with Paddy Hopkirk and Bob Riley. Taylor also had a career in property speculation. He died on 4 April 2017 after a battle with cancer.

== Complete Formula One World Championship results ==
(key)

Year	Entrant	Chassis	Engine	1	2	3	4	5	6	7	8	9	10	WDC	Points
1959	Alan Brown Equipe	Cooper T45 F2	Climax Straight-4	MON	500	NED	FRA	GBR; Ret	GER	POR	ITA	USA		NC	0
1960	Taylor-Crawley Racing Team	Lotus 18	Climax Straight-4	ARG	MON	500	NED	BEL; DNS	FRA	GBR	POR	ITA	USA	NC	0

== Sources ==
- Profile at www.grandprix.com
