= Bob Said =

American racing driver (1932–2002)

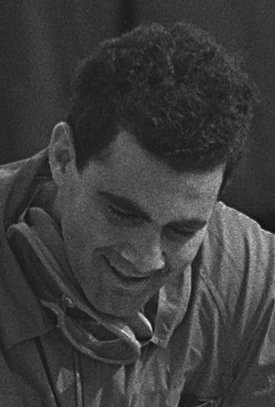
- Said at Zandvoort in 1954
- Born: Boris Robert Said Jr. May 5, 1932 New York City, United States
- Died: March 24, 2002 (aged 69) Seattle, Washington, United States
- Relatives: Boris Said (son)
Bob Said
Formula One World Championship career
- Nationality: (United States) American
- Active years: 1959
- Team: Connaught
- Entries: 1
- Championships: 0
- Wins: 0
- Podiums: 0
- Career points: 0
- Pole positions: 0
- Fastest laps: 0
- First entry: 1959 United States Grand Prix
- Last entry: 1959 United States Grand Prix
NASCAR Cup Series career
- 1 race run over 1 year
- First race: 1959 Daytona 500 (Daytona)
- Last race: 1959 Daytona 500 (Daytona)
Wins	Top tens	Poles
0	0	0

Boris Robert Said Jr. (May 5, 1932 – March 24, 2002), better known as Bob Said, was an American racing driver from the United States. The son of a Syrian father and a Russian mother, he grew up in Greenwich, Connecticut, and attended Deerfield Academy and Princeton. He discovered sports car racing during his first year at Princeton.

== Career ==
Said was born in New York City to a Syrian father and a Russian mother. In 1951, after doing well in local races and hill climbs, Said left Princeton to pursue a racing career. His first race cars were a MG TD and a Jaguar XK120. In March 1953, he made his debut at Sebring 12 Hours, driving a Frazer Nash Mille Miglia to 14th-place finish. Said was the first American to win a road race in Europe after World War II, when he won a sports car race at Rouen-Les-Essarts, driving an OSCA MT4. Later that season, he notched another win at the Anerley Trophy at Crystal Palace circuit.

In 1954, Said switched to a Ferrari 500 Mondial Scaglietti, placing third at Circuito di Senigallia; second at Trullo d’Oro; and ninth at Syracuse Circuit.

On February 21, 1955, Said set a new post-World War II speed record on the Daytona Beach and Road Course, driving a 1954 Ferrari Formula One Grand Prix car, with a two-way average speed of 170.538 mph. He also made one NASCAR start, the 1959 Daytona 500, driving a Chevrolet, where he was credited with 50th after dropping out on lap 42 due to transmission failure. He participated in the first Formula One United States Grand Prix at Sebring on December 12, 1959. He spun off on the first lap and scored no World Championship points.

Said was also a bobsled racer, competing in the Olympics twice, 1968 in Grenoble and in 1972 at Sapporo, Japan achieving a best result of tenth. The 1968 games were notable as he competed against another racing driver-come-bobsledder, Robin Widdows.

Later, Said was the executive producer of a documentary entitled The Mystery of the Sphinx.

Said's son, Boris Said III, is a retired NASCAR driver and road course ringer.

== Motorsports career results ==
=== Complete Formula One results ===
Year	Entrant	Chassis	Engine	1	2	3	4	5	6	7	8	9	WDC	Points
1959	Connaught Cars / Paul Emery	Connaught Type C	Alta Straight-4	MON	500	NED	FRA	GBR	GER	POR	ITA	USA; Ret	NC	0

=== NASCAR ===
(key) (Bold – Pole position awarded by qualifying time. Italics – Pole position earned by points standings or practice time. * – Most laps led.)

==== Grand National Series ====
NASCAR Grand National Series results
Year	Team	No.	Make	1	2	3	4	5	6	7	8	9	10	11	12	13	14	15	16	17	18	19	20	21	22	23	24	25	26	27	28	29	30	31	32	33	34	35	36	37	38	39	40	41	42	43	44	NGNC	Pts	Ref
1959	Buck Baker	89	Chevy	FAY	DAY	DAY; 50	HBO	CON	ATL	WIL	BGS	CLB	NWS	REF	HCY	MAR	TRN	CLT	NSV	ASP	PIF	GPS	ATL	CLB	WIL	RCH	BGS	AWS	DAY	HEI	CLT	MBS	CLT	NSV	AWS	BGS	GPS	CLB	DAR	HCY	RCH	CSF	HBO	MAR	AWS	NWS	CON	N/A	0	
