= Bob Cortner =

American racing driver (1927–1959)

- Cortner in 1959
- Born: April 16, 1927; Redlands, California, U.S.
- Died: May 19, 1959 (aged 32); Indianapolis, Indiana, U.S.

Formula One World Championship career
- Active years: 1958–1959
- Team(s): Kurtis Kraft, Cornis
- Entries: 2 (0 starts)
- Championships: 0
- Wins: 0
- Podiums: 0
- Career points: 0
- Pole positions: 0
- Fastest laps: 0
- First entry: 1958 Indianapolis 500
- Last entry: 1959 Indianapolis 500

Robert Charles Cortner (April 16, 1927 – May 19, 1959) was an American automobile racing driver from Redlands, California. Cortner was killed while practicing for the 1959 Indianapolis 500.

== Career ==
Cortner was active on the midget car racing circuit, with a career spanning ten years. He was the outdoor champion of the Bay Cities Racing Association in 1957, and was inducted into the association's hall of fame in 2007.

== Death ==
On Monday, May 18, Cortner passed the rookie test for the Indianapolis 500, allowing him to attempt to qualify a car for the race, which was to be held May 30. On Tuesday when Cortner took to the track, Johnnie Parsons, who observed the accident, reported that the wind was blowing harder than he had ever seen it blow at the track. Parsons stated that the car was caught in a cross wind, and first came into the infield before shooting back across the track head-first into the outer wall. Cortner's face hit the steering wheel and it appeared he began bleeding internally. He was pronounced dead that evening, the cause being listed as "massive head injuries". A number of other drivers were waiting to donate blood to Cortner when the announcement came that he had died. It was the second death at the speedway that year, as Jerry Unser had died in an accident May 17, and the 50th death overall in the history of the speedway, occurring in its 50th year of operation.

== Complete Formula One World Championship results ==
(key) (Races in italics indicate fastest lap)

| Year | Chassis | Engine | 1 | 2 | 3 | 4 | 5 | 6 | 7 | 8 | 9 | 10 | 11 | WDC | Points |
|---|---|---|---|---|---|---|---|---|---|---|---|---|---|---|---|
| 1958 | Kurtis Kraft | Offenhauser L4 | ARG | MON | NED | 500; DNQ | BEL | FRA | GBR | GER | POR | ITA | MOR | NC | 0 |
| 1959 | Cornis | Offenhauser L4 | MON | 500; DNQ | NED | FRA | GBR | GER | POR | ITA | USA | | | NC | 0 |

== Personal ==
Cortner was married with no children. He is buried at the Hillside Memorial Park cemetery in his home town of Redlands, California.

| Preceded by Jerry Unser Jr. | Formula One fatal accidents May 19, 1959 | Succeeded by Harry Schell |
