= Chuck Arnold (racing driver) =

American racecar driver

- Born: May 30, 1926; Stamford, Connecticut
- Died: September 4, 1997 (aged 71); Santa Ana, California

Formula One World Championship career
- Nationality: (United States) American
- Active years: 1959–1960
- Team(s): Gerhardt, Kurtis Kraft
- Entries: 2 (1 start)
- Championships: 0
- Wins: 0
- Podiums: 0
- Career points: 0
- Pole positions: 0
- Fastest laps: 0
- First entry: 1959 Indianapolis 500
- Last entry: 1960 Indianapolis 500

Charles Russell Arnold (May 30, 1926 – September 4, 1997) was an American racing driver. Arnold drove sporadically in the USAC Championship Car series, racing between 1959 and 1968, with 11 starts, including the 1959 Indianapolis 500. He finished in the top-ten two times, with his best finish in fifth position, in 1959 at Trenton.

== Racing record ==
=== Complete USAC Championship Car results ===
(key) (Races in bold indicate pole position)

Year	Team	1	2	3	4	5	6	7	8	9	10	11	12	13	14	15	16	17	18	19	20	21	22	23	24	25	26	27	28	Pos	Points	Ref
1957	Malamud	INDY	LAN	MIL	DET	ATL	SPR	MIL	DUQ	SYR	ISF	TRE; DNQ	SAC	PHX																NC	0	
1959	Karl Hall	DAY; DNQ	TRE; 5	INDY; 15	MIL; DNQ	LAN; DNQ	SPR																							38th	100	
1959	Speed Enterprise			INDY; DNQ																										38th	100	
1959	J. S. Donaldson							MIL; 18	DUQ			TRE; 13	SAC	PHX																38th	100	
1959	Sumar									SYR; DNQ																				38th	100	
1959	Ray Brady										ISF; DNQ																			38th	100	
1960	Mel Wiggers	TRE; 13																												NC	0	
1960	Gerhardt		INDY; DNQ	MIL																										NC	0	
1960	Vargo				LAN; DNQ	SPR; DNQ	MIL	DUQ; DNQ	SYR	ISF																				NC	0	
1960	Dayton Steel Foundry										TRE; DNQ	SAC	PHX																	NC	0	
1961	Denver–Chicago Trucking	TRE	INDY; DNQ	MIL	LAN	MIL	SPR	DUQ	SYR	ISF																				NC	0	
1961	Federal Engineering										TRE; DNQ	SAC	PHX																	NC	0	
1962	George Walther	TRE; 14																												NC	0	
1962			INDY; DNQ	MIL	LAN	TRE	SPR	MIL	LAN	SYR																				NC	0	
1962	Mitch Gallas										ISF; DNQ	TRE	SAC	PHX																NC	0	
1964	M.R.C.	PHX	TRE	INDY; DNQ	MIL; DNQ	LAN																								38th	80	
1964	Fred Maday						TRE; DNQ	SPR	MIL	DUQ	ISF	TRE; 9	SAC	PHX																38th	80	
1965		PHX	TRE	INDY	MIL	LAN; DNQ	PIK	TRE; DNQ	IRP	ATL	LAN	MIL	SPR	MIL	DUQ	ISF	TRE	SAC	PHX											NC	0	
1966	Joe Barzda	PHX	TRE	INDY	MIL	LAN	ATL; 11	PIK	IRP																					46th	60	
1966	Nelson									LAN; DNQ	SPR; DNQ	MIL	DUQ	ISF	TRE	SAC	PHX													46th	60	
1967	Compton	PHX	TRE	INDY; DNQ	MIL	LAN	PIK	MOS	MOS	IRP	LAN	MTR	MTR	SPR	MIL	DUQ	ISF													NC	0	
1967	Joe Barzda																	TRE; 15	SAC	HAN	PHX	RIV; DNQ								NC	0	
1968	Joe Barzda	HAN	LVG	PHX	TRE; 20	INDY	MIL	MOS	MOS	LAN	PIK	CDR	NAZ	IRP	IRP	LAN	LAN	MTR	MTR	SPR	MIL	DUQ	ISF	TRE	SAC	MCH	HAN	PHX	RIV	NC	0	

=== Indianapolis 500 results ===
Year	Car	Start	Qual	Rank	Finish	Laps	Led	Retired
1959	71	21	142.118	25	15	200	0	Running
**Totals**						200	0	

Starts	1
Poles	0
Front Row	0
Wins	0
Top 5	0
Top 10	0
Retired	0

=== Complete Formula One World Championship results ===
(key)

Year	Entrant	Chassis	Engine	1	2	3	4	5	6	7	8	9	10	WDC	Points
1959	Hall-Mar	Kurtis Kraft	Offenhauser L4	MON	500; 15	NED	FRA	GBR	GER	POR	ITA	USA		NC	0
1960	Fred Gerhardt	Gerhardt	Offenhauser L4	ARG	MON	500; DNQ	NED	BEL	FRA	GBR	POR	ITA	USA	NC	0
