= Sutton (constructor) =

- Industry: Auto racing

Sutton was an American racing car constructor which participated in a single FIA World Championship race - the 1959 Indianapolis 500. They scored no championship points.

Their car, a Dayton Steel Foundry/Walther, was powered by a KK500G Offenhauser I4 engine and was driven by Mike Magill. Qualifying in 31st place, the car completed 45 laps before an accident forced Magill's retirement. Magill was squeezed into the outside wall by the spinning car of Chuck Weyant, and Magill flipped over, sliding upside down off the track and into the infield. Drivers Jud Larson and Red Amick, who spun trying to avoid the accident, both stopped and lifted the damaged Sutton upright to free Magill. Their actions, and the roll bars which were made mandatory for the 1959 season, contributed to saving Magill's life.

== World Championship Indy 500 results ==
| Season | Driver | Grid | Classification | Points | Note | Race Report |
|---|---|---|---|---|---|---|
| 1959 | Mike Magill | 31 | Ret | | Accident | Report |
