= Red Amick =

American racecar driver

- Born: January 19, 1929; Kansas City, Missouri, U.S.
- Died: May 16, 1995 (aged 66); Crystal River, Florida, U.S.

Formula One World Championship career
- Nationality: (United States) American
- Active years: 1959–1960
- Team(s): Epperly, Kurtis Kraft
- Entries: 2
- Championships: 0
- Wins: 0
- Podiums: 0
- Career points: 0
- Pole positions: 0
- Fastest laps: 0
- First entry: 1959 Indianapolis 500
- Last entry: 1960 Indianapolis 500

Richard "Red" Amick (January 19, 1929 – May 16, 1995) was an American racecar driver.

== Career ==
Born in Kansas City, Missouri, Amick died in Crystal River, Florida. He drove in the USAC Championship Car series, racing in the 1958-1960 seasons with five starts, including the 1959 and 1960 Indianapolis 500 races. He finished in the top-ten once, with his best Indy finish in 11th in 1960.

== Racing record ==
=== Complete USAC Championship Car results ===
(key) (Races in bold indicate pole position)

Year	Team	1	2	3	4	5	6	7	8	9	10	11	12	13	Rank	Points	Ref
1958	George Walther	TRE; DNQ	INDY	MIL	LAN	ATL	SPR	MIL	DUQ	SYR	ISF	TRE	SAC	PHX	NC	0	
1959	Leroy Foutch	DAY	TRE	INDY; 31				MIL; DNQ	DUQ	SYR	ISF	TRE	SAC	PHX	NC	0	
1959	Chapman				MIL; DNQ	LAN	SPR								NC	0	
1960	Howard Iddings	TRE; DNQ		MIL; DNQ	LAN; 17	SPR	MIL	DUQ	SYR	ISF	TRE	SAC	PHX		31st	100	
1960	Len Faas		INDY; 11												31st	100	
1963	Mitch Gallas	TRE	INDY	MIL	LAN	TRE	SPR	MIL	DUQ	ISF	TRE; DNQ	SAC	PHX		NC	0	

=== Indianapolis 500 results ===
Year	Car	Start	Qual	Rank	Finish	Laps	Led	Retired
1959	87	26	142.925	15	31	45	0	Crash T3
1960	27	22	143.084	26	11	200	0	Running
**Totals**						245	0	

Starts	2
Poles	0
Front Row	0
Wins	0
Top 5	0
Top 10	0
Retired	1

=== Complete Formula One World Championship results ===
(key)

Year	Entrant	Chassis	Engine	1	2	3	4	5	6	7	8	9	10	WDC	Points
1959	Wheeler-Foutch	Kurtis Kraft 500C	Offenhauser L4	MON	500; 31	NED	FRA	GBR	GER	POR	ITA	USA		NC	0
1960	King O'Lawn/Leonard Faas	Epperly Indy Roadster	Offenhauser L4	ARG	MON	500; 11	NED	BEL	FRA	GBR	POR	ITA	USA	NC	0
