= George Amick =

American racing driver (1924–1959)

- Born: George Reggie Amick, Jr. October 24, 1924 Vernonia, Oregon, U.S.
- Died: April 4, 1959 (aged 34) Daytona Beach, Florida, U.S.

Champ Car career
- 43 races run over 5 years
- Years active: 1955–1959
- Best finish: 2nd – 1958
- First race: 1955 Rex Mays Classic (Milwaukee)
- Last race: 1959 Daytona 100 (Daytona)
- First win: 1956 Langhorne 100 (Langhorne)
- Last win: 1957 Atlanta 100 (Lakewood)
Wins	Podiums	Poles
3	14	3

Formula One World Championship career
- Active years: 1957–1958
- Team(s): Snowberger, Epperly
- Entries: 2 (1 start)
- Championships: 0
- Wins: 0
- Podiums: 1
- Career points: 6
- Pole positions: 0
- Fastest laps: 0
- First entry: 1957 Indianapolis 500
- Last entry: 1958 Indianapolis 500

George Reggie "Little George" Amick (October 24, 1924 – April 4, 1959) was an American racecar driver, mainly competing in the American National Championship. He was killed in a crash in a USAC 100-mile (160 km) race at Daytona International Speedway.

== Racing career ==
Amick began racing in jalopies in the Northwestern United States before switching to midget car racing. He competed in USAC National midgets for three seasons, finishing in the top-ten points each season, and won 16 feature races. He totaled 38 wins including the 1957 Turkey Night Grand Prix.

Amick moved to Indy cars and won three times in 43 starts. In his rookie appearance at the Indianapolis 500 in 1958, Amick was assigned a "lay-down" roadster commissioned by car owner Norm Demler, designed by Quin Epperly, and based upon George Salih's 1957 race-winning design. Amick finished second to leader Jimmy Bryan, and was named the 1958 Indianapolis 500 Rookie of the Year.

== Death ==
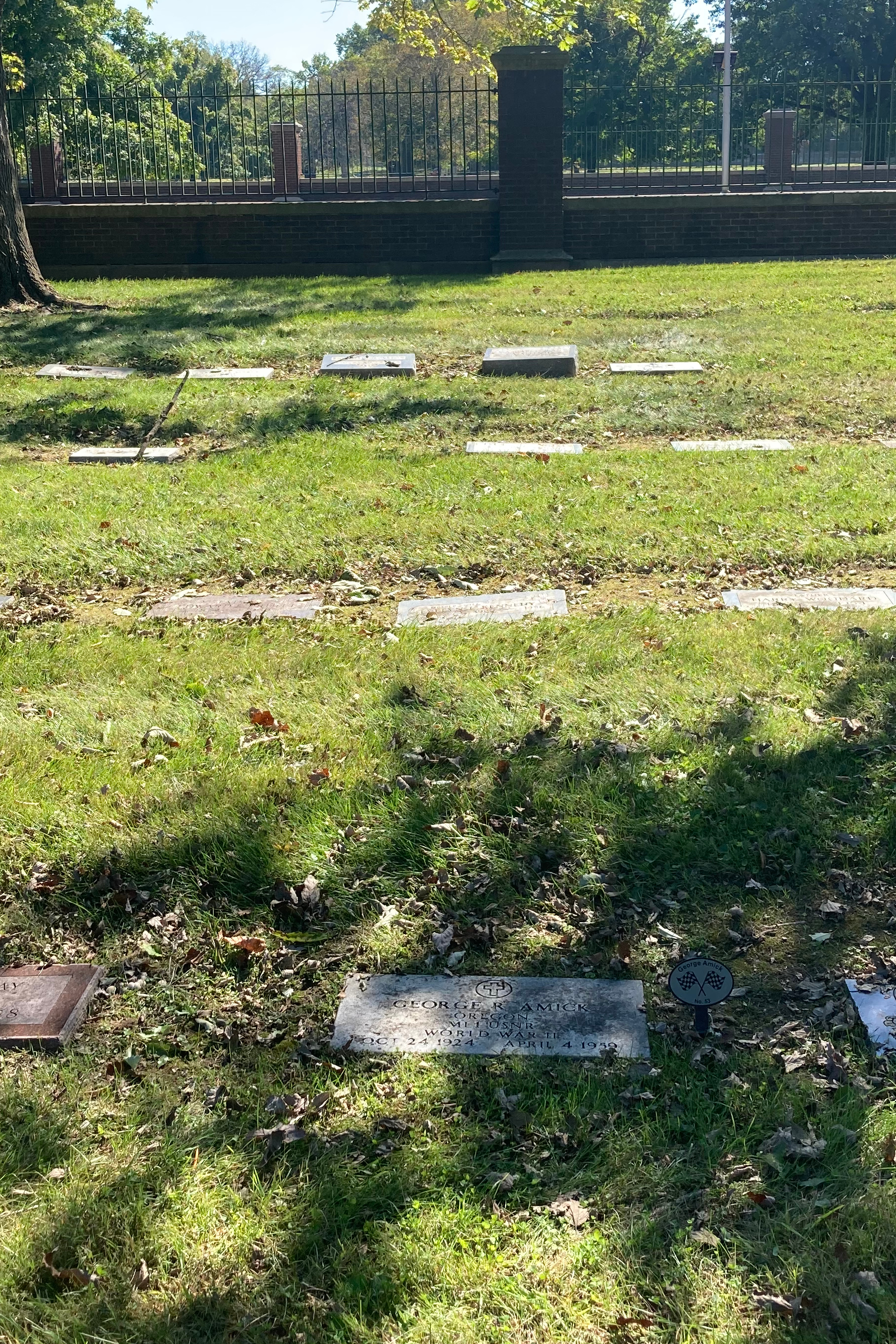
Amick's grave at Crown Hill Cemetery

Amick was competing in the only Indy Car race ever run at the Daytona International Speedway and was killed in an accident on the final lap. He is buried at Crown Hill Cemetery in section 235, lot 723 (39.8250392°N 86.179486°W) in Indianapolis.

== Awards ==
Amick was inducted into the National Midget Auto Racing Hall of Fame in 2009.

== Racing record ==
=== Complete AAA/USAC Championship Car results ===
(key) (Races in bold indicate pole position)

Year	Team	1	2	3	4	5	6	7	8	9	10	11	12	13	Rank	Points	Ref
1955	Emmett Malloy	INDY	MIL; 7	LAN; 18											9th	750	
1955	Lindsey Hopkins Jr.				SPR; 4	MIL; 20	DUQ; 3	PIK	SYR; 3	ISF; 3	SAC; 12	PHX; 3			9th	750	
1956	Cole	INDY	MIL; DNQ												4th	1050	
1956	Pete Salemi			LAN; 1	DAR; 4	ATL; 13	SPR; DNQ	MIL; 6	DUQ; 5	SYR; 5	ISF; 12				4th	1050	
1956	Lindsey Hopkins Jr.											SAC; 13	**PHX**; 1		4th	1050	
1957	Federal Engineering	INDY; DNQ													3rd	1400	
1957	Lindsey Hopkins Jr.		LAN; 5	MIL; 6	**DET**; 2	ATL; 1	**SPR**; 3	MIL; 5	DUQ; 16	SYR; 5	ISF; 3	TRE; 3	SAC; 4	PHX; 11	3rd	1400	
1958	Peter Schmidt	TRE; 6													2nd	1640	
1958	Norm Demler		INDY; 2												2nd	1640	
1958	Lindsey Hopkins Jr.			MIL; 6	LAN; 14	ATL; 2	SPR; 18	MIL; 4	DUQ; 18	SYR; 2	ISF; Wth	TRE; 19	SAC; 4	PHX; 15	2nd	1640	
1959	George Bignotti	DAY; 4	TRE	INDY	MIL	LAN	SPR	MIL	DUQ	SYR	ISF	TRE	SAC	PHX	36th	120	

=== Indianapolis 500 results ===
Year	Car	Start	Qual	Rank	Finish	Laps	Led	Retired
1958	99	25	142.710	25	2	200	18	Running
**Totals**						200	18	

Starts	1
Poles	0
Front Row	0
Wins	0
Top 5	1
Top 10	1
Retired	0

=== Complete Formula One World Championship results ===
(key)

Year	Entrant	Chassis	Engine	1	2	3	4	5	6	7	8	9	10	11	WDC	Points
1957	Federal Engineering	Snowberger	Offenhauser L4	ARG	MON	500; DNQ	FRA	GBR	GER	PES	ITA				NC	0
1958	Norman Demler	Epperly Indy Roadster	Offenhauser L4	ARG	MON	NED	500; 2	BEL	FRA	GBR	GER	POR	ITA	MOR	15th	6

Sporting positions
Preceded by Don Edmunds	Indianapolis 500 Rookie of the Year; 1958	Succeeded by Bobby Grim
