= Bill Cheesbourg =

American racing driver (1927–1995)

- Born: June 12, 1927
- Died: November 6, 1995 (aged 68)

Formula One World Championship career
- Nationality: (United States) American
- Active years: 1956–1959
- Team(s): Kuzma, Kurtis Kraft, Lesovsky
- Entries: 4 (3 starts)
- Championships: 0
- Wins: 0
- Podiums: 0
- Career points: 0
- Pole positions: 0
- Fastest laps: 0
- First entry: 1956 Indianapolis 500
- Last entry: 1959 Indianapolis 500

William Bernard Cheesbourg (June 12, 1927 Tucson, Arizona – November 6, 1995 Tucson, Arizona) was an American racecar driver who participated in six Indianapolis 500 races.

== Biography ==
Cheesbourg was born on June 12, 1927, in Tucson, Arizona.

Cheesbourg started racing jalopies in Tucson and successfully moved into midgets racing all over Arizona after World War II. He drove in the USAC Championship Car series, racing in the 1956-1962 and 1964-1966 seasons with 31 starts, including the Indianapolis 500 races in 1957-1959, 1961, 1964, and 1965. He successfully bumped his way into the Indy 500 field after initially being bumped out three times, which is the race record. He finished in the top-ten in stock cars eight times, with his best finish in seventh position in 1959 at Daytona and in 1966 at Fuji.

Cheesbourg returned to the local dirt short track racing scene after his Indy Car career was finished. He is known for the help he offered to many other racers. He won several Arizona Late Model Stock Car championships racing at Corona Speedway in Tucson, Manzanita Speedway in Phoenix and many other tracks. He was known equally for his ability to use his front bumper and his natural talents.

Even after he stopped traditional stock car racing, Cheesbourg continued helping others and eventually helped construct and drive a local high school's entry in an electric car race held at Phoenix International Raceway. He even competed for a while in local figure eight racing just for the fun of it.

Cheesbourg died of cancer on November 6, 1995, in Tucson, Arizona.

== Indianapolis 500 results ==
Year	Car	Start	Qual	Rank	Finish	Laps	Led	Retired
1957	31	23	141.565	13	26	81	0	Fuel leak
1958	54	33	142.546	30	10	200	0	Running
1959	53	30	141.788	30	21	147	0	Magneto
1961	14	9	145.873	11	28	50	0	Crash FS
1964	62	33	148.711	33	16	131	0	Engine
1965	47	33	153.774	33	32	14	0	Magneto
Totals						623	0	

Starts	6
Poles	0
Front Row	0
Wins	0
Top 5	0
Top 10	1
Retired	5

== Complete Formula One World Championship results ==
(key)

Year	Entrant	Chassis	Engine	1	2	3	4	5	6	7	8	9	10	11	WDC	Points
1956	Cecil McDonald	Lesovsky	Offenhauser L4	ARG	MON	500; DNQ	BEL	FRA	GBR	GER	ITA				NC	0
1957	Schildmeier Seal / Donaldson	Kurtis Kraft 500G	Offenhauser L4	ARG	MON	500; 26	FRA	GBR	GER	PES	ITA				NC	0
1958	Novi Racing	Kurtis Kraft 500G	Novi V8	ARG	MON	NED	500; 10	BEL	FRA	GBR	GER	POR	ITA	MOR	NC	0
1959	Greenman - Casale	Kuzma Indy Roadster	Offenhauser L4	MON	500; 21	NED	FRA	GBR	GER	POR	ITA	USA			NC	0
