= Van Johnson (racing driver) =

American racing driver (1927–1959)

- Born: Van Dale Johnson; February 4, 1927 Greeley, Colorado, U.S.
- Died: July 19, 1959 (aged 32) Williams Grove, Pennsylvania, U.S.

Champ Car career
- 6 races run over 4 years
- Years active: 1956–1959
- Best finish: 26th – 1959
- First race: 1956 Bobby Ball Memorial (ASF)
- Last race: 1959 Langhorne 100 (Langhorne)
- First win: 1959 Langhorne 100 (Langhorne)
Wins	Podiums	Poles
1	1	0

Van Dale Johnson (February 4, 1927 – July 19, 1959) was an American racing driver. Born in Greeley, Colorado, Johnson grew up in Anaheim, California where he attended schools. Before heading east to further his racing career, Johnson raced jalopies and midgets on Southern California tracks, most notably Culver City Speedway, though he is also known to have competed at Carrell Speedway as well.

Johnson competed in the United States Auto Club National Championship from 1956 to 1959, making six starts. He also failed to qualify or crashed in practice in eleven more race attempts, including the Indianapolis 500 in 1958 and 1959. He captured his first and only race win in his sixth race start in June 1959 at the famed Langhorne Speedway.

A month later in his next race, Johnson was killed in a third-lap crash in a Non-Championship race at Williams Grove Speedway where his car was either rammed from the side by that of Joe Barzda or the wheels of their cars became entangled. Barzda's car had suffered a reported stuck throttle when entering the third turn and, after making contact, flipped over just as Johnson's. While Barzda escaped with minor injuries, Johnson died of a skull fracture and other injuries or a broken neck.

Johnson's Vargo Special was the same racer in which Dick Linder had perished a few months earlier and in which Hugh Randall would be killed three years later.

At the time of his death, Johnson was reported to be a resident of Pittsburgh, Pennsylvania and a former resident of Anaheim, California, Bally, Pennsylvania, where he had moved about three years before his death, and Norristown, Pennsylvania.

== Complete USAC Championship Car results ==
Year	1	2	3	4	5	6	7	8	9	10	11	12	13	Pos	Points
1956	INDY	MIL	LAN	DAR	ATL	SPR	MIL	DUQ; DNQ	SYR; DNQ	ISF; DNP	SAC	PHX; 18		-	0
1957	INDY	LAN; 10	MIL	DET; DNQ	ATL	SPR; 16	MIL; DNQ	DUQ	SYR; 15	ISF; DNQ	TRE; DNQ	SAC	PHX	35th	30
1958	TRE	INDY; DNQ	MIL	LAN	ATL	SPR; DNQ	MIL	DUQ	SYR	ISF	TRE	SAC	PHX	-	0
1959	DAY	TRE; 10	INDY; DNQ	MIL	LAN; 1	SPR	MIL	DUQ	SYR	ISF	TRE	SAC	PHX	26th	230
