= Bobby Grim =

American racing driver (1924–1995)

- Born: Robert Harold Grim; September 4, 1924 Coal City, Indiana, U.S.
- Died: June 14, 1995 (aged 70) Indianapolis, Indiana, U.S.

Champ Car career
- 64 races run over 12 years
- Years active: 1958–1969
- Best finish: 12th – 1959
- First race: 1958 Golden State 100 (Sacramento)
- Last race: 1969 Langhorne 150 (Langhorne)
- First win: 1960 Syracuse 100 (Syracuse)
| Wins | Podiums | Poles |
|---|---|---|
| 1 | 3 | 0 |

Formula One World Championship career
- Active years: 1959–1960
- Team(s): Christensen, Meskowski
- Entries: 2
- Championships: 0
- Wins: 0
- Podiums: 0
- Career points: 0
- Pole positions: 0
- Fastest laps: 0
- First entry: 1959 Indianapolis 500
- Last entry: 1960 Indianapolis 500

Robert Harold Grim (September 4, 1924 – June 14, 1995) was an American racecar driver.

Born in Coal City, Indiana, Grim died of cancer in Indianapolis. He drove in the USAC Championship Car series, racing in the 1958–1969 seasons with 66 starts, including the Indianapolis 500 races each year from 1959 to 1968 except 1965. He finished in the top-ten 30 times, with his one victory coming in 1960 at Syracuse. He won the 1959 Indy Rookie of the Year, despite finishing in 26th position. He was also the IMCA sprint car champion from 1955 to 1958 driving the famed "Black Deuce" Offy of Hector Honore. Grim was the 1959 Indianapolis 500 Rookie of the Year.

== Complete USAC Championship Car results ==
| Year | 1 | 2 | 3 | 4 | 5 | 6 | 7 | 8 | 9 | 10 | 11 | 12 | 13 | 14 | 15 | 16 | 17 | 18 | 19 | 20 | 21 | 22 | 23 | 24 | 25 | 26 | 27 | 28 | Pos | Points |
|---|---|---|---|---|---|---|---|---|---|---|---|---|---|---|---|---|---|---|---|---|---|---|---|---|---|---|---|---|---|---|
| 1958 | TRE | INDY | MIL | LAN | ATL | SPR | MIL | DUQ | SYR | ISF | TRE | SAC; 10 | PHX; 12 | | | | | | | | | | | | | | | | 36th | 40 |
| 1959 | DAY | TRE; 7 | INDY; 26 | MIL; 11 | LAN; 16 | SPR; 16 | MIL; 26 | DUQ; 5 | SYR; 5 | ISF; 6 | TRE; 9 | SAC; 6 | PHX; DNQ | | | | | | | | | | | | | | | | 12th | 480 |
| 1960 | TRE; 10 | INDY; 16 | MIL; 19 | LAN; 8 | SPR; 18 | MIL; DNQ | DUQ; 7 | SYR; 1 | ISF; 16 | TRE; DNQ | SAC; 9 | PHX; 5 | | | | | | | | | | | | | | | | | 14th | 480 |
| 1961 | TRE | INDY; 32 | MIL | LAN | MIL | SPR; DNQ | DUQ; DNQ | SYR; DNQ | ISF; DNQ | TRE | SAC | PHX | | | | | | | | | | | | | | | | | - | 0 |
| 1962 | TRE | INDY; 19 | MIL | LAN | TRE | SPR; 8 | MIL | LAN | SYR | ISF; 11 | TRE; 11 | SAC | PHX | | | | | | | | | | | | | | | | 23rd | 97 |
| 1963 | TRE | INDY; 25 | MIL; 11 | LAN | TRE; 2 | SPR | MIL; 9 | DUQ | ISF; 11 | TRE | SAC; 8 | PHX; 10 | | | | | | | | | | | | | | | | | 14th | 440 |
| 1964 | PHX; 13 | TRE; 8 | INDY; 10 | MIL; DNQ | LAN | TRE; 20 | SPR; DNQ | MIL; 19 | DUQ | ISF | TRE; DNQ | SAC | PHX; 12 | | | | | | | | | | | | | | | | 23rd | 220 |
| 1965 | PHX | TRE; 15 | INDY; DNQ | MIL; 8 | LAN; 11 | PPR | TRE; 3 | IRP | ATL; 28 | LAN | MIL; 24 | ISF | MIL; 8 | DSF | INF | TRE; 7 | SAC | PHX | | | | | | | | | | | 17th | 500 |
| 1966 | PHX | TRE; 7 | INDY; 31 | MIL; 8 | LAN; DNQ | ATL; 13 | PIP | IRP; 12 | LAN | SPR | MIL; 13 | DUQ | ISF | TRE; 25 | SAC | PHX; 7 | | | | | | | | | | | | | 24th | 275 |
| 1967 | PHX | TRE | INDY; 13 | MIL; 23 | LAN | PIP | MOS | MOS | IRP; DNQ | LAN; DNQ | MTR | MTR | SPR | MIL; 15 | DUQ | ISF | TRE; 20 | SAC | HAN; 14 | PHX | RIV | | | | | | | | - | 0 |
| 1968 | HAN | LVG | PHX | TRE | INDY; 10 | MIL | MOS | MOS | LAN | PIP | CDR | NAZ | IRP | IRP | LAN | LAN | MTR | MTR | SPR | MIL | DUQ; DNQ | ISF | TRE | SAC | MCH | HAN | PHX | RIV | 34th | 150 |
| 1969 | PHX | HAN | INDY | MIL; DNQ | LAN; 11 | PIP | CDR | NAZ | TRE | IRP | IRP | MIL | SPR | DOV | DUQ | ISF | BRN | BRN | TRE | SAC | KEN | KEN | PHX | RIV | | | | | 52nd | 30 |

== Indianapolis 500 results ==
| Year | Car | Start | Qual | Rank | Finish | Laps | Led | Retired |
|---|---|---|---|---|---|---|---|---|
| 1959 | 48 | 5 | 144.225 | 6 | 26 | 85 | 0 | Piston |
| 1960 | 14 | 21 | 143.158 | 25 | 16 | 194 | 0 | Flagged |
| 1961 | 16 | 24 | 144.029 | 33 | 32 | 26 | 0 | Piston |
| 1962 | 18 | 15 | 146.604 | 22 | 19 | 96 | 0 | Oil Leak |
| 1963 | 26 | 20 | 148.717 | 19 | 25 | 79 | 0 | Oil Leak |
| 1964 | 16 | 20 | 151.038 | 27 | 10 | 196 | 0 | Flagged |
| 1966 | 39 | 31 | 158.367 | 33 | 31 | 0 | 0 | Crash FS |
| 1967 | 39 | 12 | 164.084 | 14 | 13 | 187 | 0 | Crash FS |
| 1968 | 6 | 25 | 162.866 | 25 | 10 | 196 | 0 | Flagged |
| Totals | | | | | | 1059 | 0 | |

| Starts | 9 |
| Poles | 0 |
| Front Row | 0 |
| Wins | 0 |
| Top 5 | 0 |
| Top 10 | 2 |
| Retired | 6 |

== World Championship career summary ==
The Indianapolis 500 was part of the FIA World Championship from 1950 through 1960. Drivers competing at Indy during those years were credited with World Championship points and participation. Grim participated in two World Championship races. He started on the pole 0 times, won 0 races, set 0 fastest laps, and finished on the podium 0 times. He accumulated a total of 0 championship points.

== Award ==
Grim was inducted in the National Sprint Car Hall of Fame in 1992.

Sporting positions
| Preceded by George Amick | Indianapolis 500; Rookie of the Year; 1959 | Succeeded by Jim Hurtubise |
