= Joe Barzda =

American racing driver (1915–1993)

- Born: May 22, 1915
- Died: October 11, 1993 (aged 78)

Formula One World Championship career
- Nationality: (United States) American
- Active years: 1951–1953
- Team: non-works Maserati
- Entries: 3 (0 starts)
- Championships: 0
- Wins: 0
- Podiums: 0
- Career points: 0
- Pole positions: 0
- Fastest laps: 0
- First entry: 1951 Indianapolis 500
- Last entry: 1953 Indianapolis 500

Joseph John Barzda (May 22, 1915 – October 11, 1993) was an American racing driver from New Brunswick, New Jersey.

Barzda was primarily a midget racing and sprint car racing driver but made ten starts in the USAC National Championship from 1952 to 1959. His best race finish was a pair of fourth places in 1958 at Springfield and Trenton. He finished 18th in the 1958 National Championship. He unsuccessfully attempted to qualify for the Indianapolis 500 in 1951, 1952, and 1953. He retired after he was involved in a crash at Williams Grove Speedway in 1959 where Van Johnson died. Barzda survived with minor injuries.

In 1958 and 1959, Barzda was noted for fielding a Chevrolet-powered sprint car at a time when nearly all competitive sprint cars had Offenhauser engines.

Barzda and his brother Jim owned California Speed Shop in New Brunswick, New Jersey and continued to field racing cars after Joe's retirement from the cockpit.

== Racing record ==
=== Complete Formula One World Championship results ===
(key)

Year	Entrant	Chassis	Engine	1	2	3	4	5	6	7	8	9	WDC	Pts
1951	Joe Barzda	Maserati 8CTF	Offenhauser 4.5 L4	SUI	500; DNQ	BEL	FRA	GBR	GER	ITA	ESP		NC	0
1952	California Speed	Maserati 8CTF	Offenhauser 4.5 L4	SUI	500; DNQ	BEL	FRA	GBR	GER	NED	ITA		NC	0
1953	California Speed	Maserati 8CTF	Maserati 3.0 L8s	ARG	500; DNQ	NED	BEL	FRA	GBR	GER	SUI	ITA	NC	0
