= Mike Magill =

American racecar driver

- Born: February 8, 1920
- Died: August 31, 2006 (aged 86)

Formula One World Championship career
- Nationality: (United States) American
- Active years: 1956–1959
- Team(s): Sutton, Kurtis Kraft, Templeton
- Entries: 4 (3 starts)
- Championships: 0
- Wins: 0
- Podiums: 0
- Career points: 0
- Pole positions: 0
- Fastest laps: 0
- First entry: 1956 Indianapolis 500 (DNQ)
- Last entry: 1959 Indianapolis 500

Charles Edward "Mike" Magill (February 8, 1920; Haddonfield, New Jersey – August 31, 2006; Haddonfield, New Jersey) was an American racecar driver.

After serving in the Army during World War II, Magill raced in the AAA and USAC Championship Car series from 1955 to 1959, with 15 career starts. He finished in the top-ten seven times, with his best finish in fourth position in 1955 at Langhorne.

Magill competed in the Indianapolis 500 three times, with his first start coming in 1957. The next year, when racing legend Juan Manuel Fangio was unable to compete due to a contractual conflict, Magill drove the car in which Fangio had been practicing. He was involved in an accident in the first lap of the race but, after over an hour in the pits, he returned to the track to finish 17th. He drove in his final 500 in 1959, when he was eliminated from the race in a four-car accident.

== Indianapolis 500 results ==
Year	Car	Start	Qual	Rank	Finish	Laps	Led	Retired
1957	77	18	140.411	24	24	101	0	Crash T4
1958	77	31	142.276	32	17	136	0	Flagged
1959	77	31	141.482	31	30	45	0	Crash T3
Totals						282	0	

Starts	3
Poles	0
Front Row	0
Wins	0
Top 5	0
Top 10	0
Retired	2

== World Championship career summary ==
The Indianapolis 500 was part of the FIA World Championship from 1950 through 1960. Drivers competing at Indy during those years were credited with World Championship points and participation. Mike Magill participated in 3 World Championship races but scored no World Championship points.
