= 1959 Formula One season =

13th season of FIA Formula One motor racing

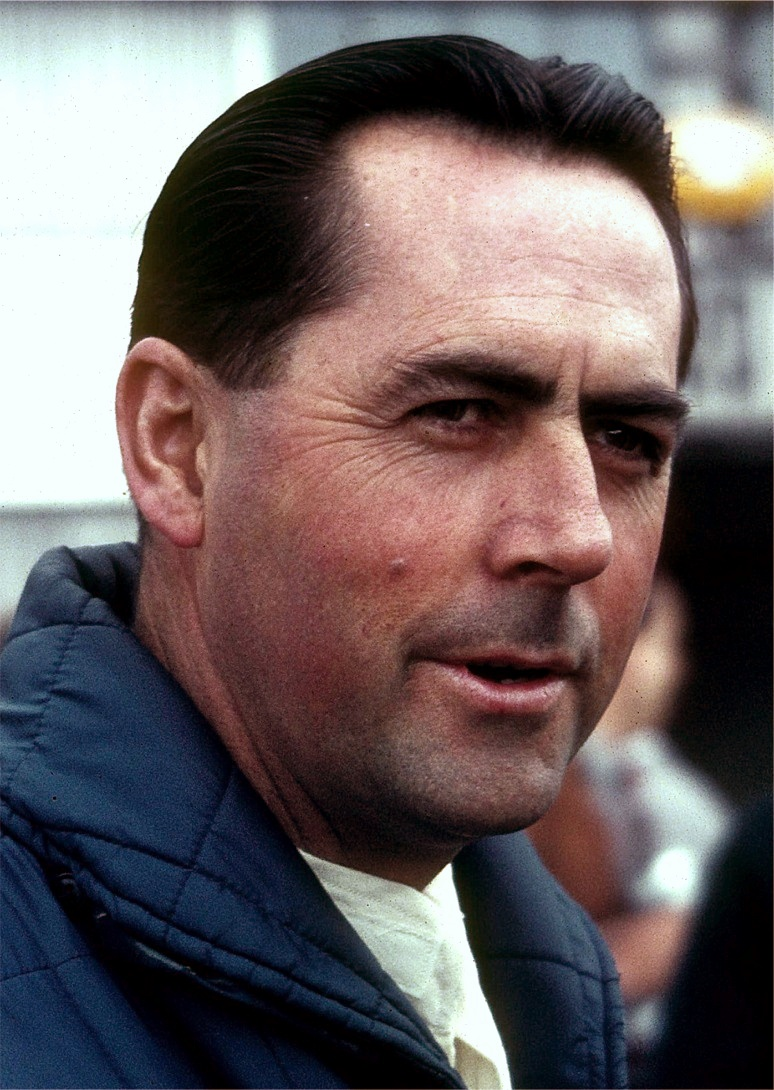
Jack Brabham (pictured in 1966) won his first of three drivers' championships, driving a Cooper-Climax

The 1959 Formula One season was the 13th season of FIA Formula One motor racing. It featured the 10th World Championship of Drivers, the second International Cup for F1 Manufacturers and five non-championship Formula One races. The World Championship was contested over nine races between 10 May and 12 December 1959.

At the beginning of the year, there were no world champions on the grid. Five-time champion Juan Manuel Fangio had retired after the previous season.

The 1958 champion Mike Hawthorn was unable to defend his title, having retired from the sport, but also having been killed in a road accident.

Going into the final race, there were three drivers that could clinch their first championship. Jack Brabham driving for Cooper ran out of fuel but pushed his car over the line to win his first Drivers' Championship. He was the first Australian champion. Cooper also won their first Manufacturers' title.

Two F1 drivers lost their lives in racing accidents. Firstly, Jean Behra raced in the sports car race that preceded the 1959 German Grand Prix at AVUS. Rain had been falling and the track was slippery.Behra's Porsche 718 RSK went over the top of the 43 degree banked turn and he incurred a skull fracture when he struck a flagpole with his head. The other driver to die was Ivor Bueb, who crashed his BRP Formula Two car at the Charade Circuit. He was thrown from the car and died six days later in hospital.

== Teams and drivers ==
The following teams and drivers competed in the 1959 FIA World Championship.

Entrant	Constructor	Chassis	Engine	Tyre	Driver	Rounds
(West Germany) Dr Ing F. Porsche KG	Behra-Porsche-Porsche	RSK	Porsche 547/3 1.5 F4	D	(Italy) Maria Teresa de Filippis	1
(West Germany) Dr Ing F. Porsche KG	Porsche	718 RSK; 718/2	Porsche 547/3 1.5 F4	D	(West Germany) Wolfgang von Trips	1, 6
(Belgium) Equipe Nationale Belge	Cooper-Climax	T51	Climax FPF 1.5 L4	D	(Belgium) Lucien Bianchi	1
(Belgium) Equipe Nationale Belge	Cooper-Climax	T51	Climax FPF 1.5 L4	D	(Belgium) Alain de Changy	1
(France) Jean Lucienbonnet	Cooper-Climax	T45	Climax FPF 1.5 L4	D	(France) Jean Lucienbonnet	1
(United Kingdom) Owen Racing Organisation	BRM	P25	BRM P25 2.5 L4	D	(United States) Harry Schell	1, 3–8
(United Kingdom) Owen Racing Organisation	BRM	P25	BRM P25 2.5 L4	D	(Sweden) Jo Bonnier	1, 3–8
(United Kingdom) Owen Racing Organisation	BRM	P25	BRM P25 2.5 L4	D	(United Kingdom) Ron Flockhart	1, 4–5, 7–8
(United Kingdom) Cooper Car Company	Cooper-Climax	T51	Climax FPF 2.5 L4	D	(New Zealand) Bruce McLaren	1, 4–9
(United Kingdom) Cooper Car Company	Cooper-Climax	T51	Climax FPF 2.5 L4	D	(Australia) Jack Brabham	1, 3–9
(United Kingdom) Cooper Car Company	Cooper-Climax	T51	Climax FPF 2.5 L4	D	(United States) Masten Gregory	1, 3–7
(United Kingdom) Cooper Car Company	Cooper-Climax	T51	Climax FPF 2.5 L4	D	(Italy) Giorgio Scarlatti	8
(United Kingdom) R.R.C. Walker Racing Team	Cooper-Climax	T51	Climax FPF 2.5 L4	D	(United Kingdom) Stirling Moss	1, 3, 6–9
(United Kingdom) R.R.C. Walker Racing Team	Cooper-Climax	T51	Climax FPF 2.5 L4	D	(France) Maurice Trintignant	1, 3–9
(United Kingdom) British Racing Partnership	BRM	P25	BRM P25 2.5 L4	D	(United Kingdom) Stirling Moss	4–5
(United Kingdom) British Racing Partnership	BRM	P25	BRM P25 2.5 L4	D	(West Germany) Hans Herrmann	6
(United Kingdom) British Racing Partnership	Cooper-Climax	T51	Climax FPF 1.5 L4	D	(United Kingdom) Ivor Bueb	1
(United Kingdom) British Racing Partnership	Cooper-Borgward	T51	Borgward 1500 RS 1.5 L4	D	(United Kingdom) Ivor Bueb	5
(United Kingdom) British Racing Partnership	Cooper-Borgward	T51	Borgward 1500 RS 1.5 L4	D	(United Kingdom) Chris Bristow	5
(United Kingdom) High Efficiency Motors	Cooper-Maserati	T45	Maserati 250S 2.5 L4	D	(United Kingdom) Roy Salvadori	1, 4, 9
(United Kingdom) High Efficiency Motors	Cooper-Maserati	T45	Maserati 250S 2.5 L4	D	(United Kingdom) Jack Fairman	8
(United Kingdom) High Efficiency Motors	Cooper-Climax	T45	Climax FPF 2.5 L4	D	(United Kingdom) Jack Fairman	5
(United Kingdom) Team Lotus	Lotus-Climax	16	Climax FPF 2.5 L4	D	(United Kingdom) Graham Hill	1, 3–8
(United Kingdom) Team Lotus	Lotus-Climax	16	Climax FPF 2.5 L4	D	(United States) Pete Lovely	1
(United Kingdom) Team Lotus	Lotus-Climax	16	Climax FPF 2.5 L4	D	(United Kingdom) Innes Ireland	3–4, 6–9
(United Kingdom) Team Lotus	Lotus-Climax	16	Climax FPF 2.5 L4	D	(United Kingdom) Alan Stacey	5, 9
(United Kingdom) John Fisher	Lotus-Climax	16	Climax FPF 1.5 L4	D	(United Kingdom) Bruce Halford	1
(Italy) Scuderia Ferrari	Ferrari	246; 156	Ferrari 155 2.4 V6; Ferrari D156 1.5 V6	D	(France) Jean Behra	1, 3–4
(Italy) Scuderia Ferrari	Ferrari	246; 156	Ferrari 155 2.4 V6; Ferrari D156 1.5 V6	D	(United States) Phil Hill	1, 3–4, 6–9
(Italy) Scuderia Ferrari	Ferrari	246; 156	Ferrari 155 2.4 V6; Ferrari D156 1.5 V6	D	(United Kingdom) Tony Brooks	1, 3–4, 6–9
(Italy) Scuderia Ferrari	Ferrari	246; 156	Ferrari 155 2.4 V6; Ferrari D156 1.5 V6	D	(United Kingdom) Cliff Allison	1, 3, 6, 8–9
(Italy) Scuderia Ferrari	Ferrari	246; 156	Ferrari 155 2.4 V6; Ferrari D156 1.5 V6	D	(Belgium) Olivier Gendebien	4, 8
(Italy) Scuderia Ferrari	Ferrari	246; 156	Ferrari 155 2.4 V6; Ferrari D156 1.5 V6	D	(United States) Dan Gurney	4, 6–8
(Italy) Scuderia Ferrari	Ferrari	246; 156	Ferrari 155 2.4 V6; Ferrari D156 1.5 V6	D	(West Germany) Wolfgang von Trips	9
(Italy) Scuderia Ugolini	Maserati	250F	Maserati 250F1 2.5 L6	D	(Italy) Giorgio Scarlatti	1, 4
(Italy) Scuderia Ugolini	Maserati	250F	Maserati 250F1 2.5 L6	D	(Netherlands) Carel Godin de Beaufort	4
(Monaco) Monte Carlo Auto Sport	Maserati	250F	Maserati 250F1 2.5 L6	D	(Monaco) André Testut	1
(United Kingdom) David Brown Corporation	Aston Martin	DBR4	Aston Martin RB6 2.5 L6	A	(United Kingdom) Roy Salvadori	3, 5, 7–8
(United Kingdom) David Brown Corporation	Aston Martin	DBR4	Aston Martin RB6 2.5 L6	A	(United States) Carroll Shelby	3, 5, 7–8
(Netherlands) Ecurie Maarsbergen	Porsche	718 RSK	Porsche 547/3 1.5 F4	D	(Netherlands) Carel Godin de Beaufort	3
(Italy) Scuderia Centro Sud	Cooper-Maserati	T51	Maserati 250S 2.5 L4	D	(United Kingdom) Ian Burgess	4–6, 8
(Italy) Scuderia Centro Sud	Cooper-Maserati	T51	Maserati 250S 2.5 L4	D	(United Kingdom) Colin Davis	4, 8
(Italy) Scuderia Centro Sud	Cooper-Maserati	T51	Maserati 250S 2.5 L4	D	(West Germany) Hans Herrmann	5
(Italy) Scuderia Centro Sud	Cooper-Maserati	T51	Maserati 250S 2.5 L4	D	(Portugal) Mario Araujo de Cabral	7
(Italy) Scuderia Centro Sud	Maserati	250F	Maserati 250F1 2.5 L6	D	(Uruguay) Asdrúbal Fontes Bayardo	4
(Italy) Scuderia Centro Sud	Maserati	250F	Maserati 250F1 2.5 L6	D	(Brazil) Fritz d'Orey	4–5
(United Kingdom) Vandervell Products	Vanwall	VW 59	Vanwall 254 2.5 L4	D	(United Kingdom) Tony Brooks	5
(United Kingdom) J.B. Naylor	JBW-Maserati	59	Maserati 250S 2.5 L4	D	(United Kingdom) Brian Naylor	5
(United Kingdom) Ace Garage – Rotherham	Cooper-Climax	T51	Climax FPF 1.5 L4	D	(United Kingdom) Trevor Taylor	5
(United Kingdom) Alan Brown Equipe	Cooper-Climax	T45	Climax FPF 1.5 L4	D	(United Kingdom) Mike Taylor	5
(United Kingdom) Alan Brown Equipe	Cooper-Climax	T45	Climax FPF 1.5 L4	D	(United Kingdom) Peter Ashdown	5
(United Kingdom) Gilby Engineering	Cooper-Climax	T43	Climax FPF 1.5 L4	D	(United Kingdom) Keith Greene	5
(United Kingdom) United Racing Stable	Cooper-Climax	T51	Climax FPF 1.5 L4	D	(United Kingdom) Bill Moss	5
(United Kingdom) R.H.H. Parnell	Cooper-Climax	T51; T45	Climax FPF 1.5 L4	D	(United Kingdom) Henry Taylor	5
(United Kingdom) R.H.H. Parnell	Cooper-Climax	T51; T45	Climax FPF 1.5 L4	D	(United Kingdom) Tim Parnell	5
(United Kingdom) David Fry	Fry-Climax	F2	Climax FPF 1.5 L4	D	(United Kingdom) Mike Parkes	5
(United Kingdom) Dennis Taylor	Lotus-Climax	12	Climax FPF 1.5 L4	D	(United Kingdom) Dennis Taylor	5
(United Kingdom) Dorchester Service Station	Lotus-Climax	16	Climax FPF 1.5 L4	D	(United Kingdom) David Piper	5
(France) Jean Behra	Behra-Porsche-Porsche	RSK	Porsche 547/3 1.5 F4	D	(France) Jean Behra	6
(Switzerland) Ottorino Volonterio	Maserati	250F	Maserati 250F1 2.5 L6	D	(Italy) Giulio Cabianca	8
(United States) Leader Cards Inc.	Kurtis Kraft-Offenhauser	Midget	Offenhauser 1.7 L4	F	(United States) Rodger Ward	9
(Italy) OSCA Automobili	Cooper-OSCA	T43	OSCA 2.0 L4	D	(Argentina) Alejandro de Tomaso	9
(United States) Camoradi USA	Tec-Mec-Maserati	F415	Maserati 250F1 2.5 L6	D	(Brazil) Fritz d'Orey	9
(United Kingdom) Taylor-Crawley Racing Team	Cooper-Climax	T45	Climax FPF 2.5 L4	D	(United States) George Constantine	9
(United States) Blanchard Automobile Co.	Porsche	718 RSK	Porsche 547/3 1.5 F4	G	(United States) Harry Blanchard	9
(United Kingdom) Connaught Cars-Paul Emery	Connaught-Alta	C	Alta GP 2.5 L4	D	(United States) Bob Said	9
(France) Ecurie Bleue	Cooper-Climax	T51	Climax FPF 2.5 L4	D	(United States) Harry Schell	9
(United States) Phil Cade	Maserati	250F	Maserati 250F1 2.5 L6	D	(United States) Phil Cade	9

Note: The above list does not reflect competitors in the 1959 Indianapolis 500.

=== Team and driver changes ===
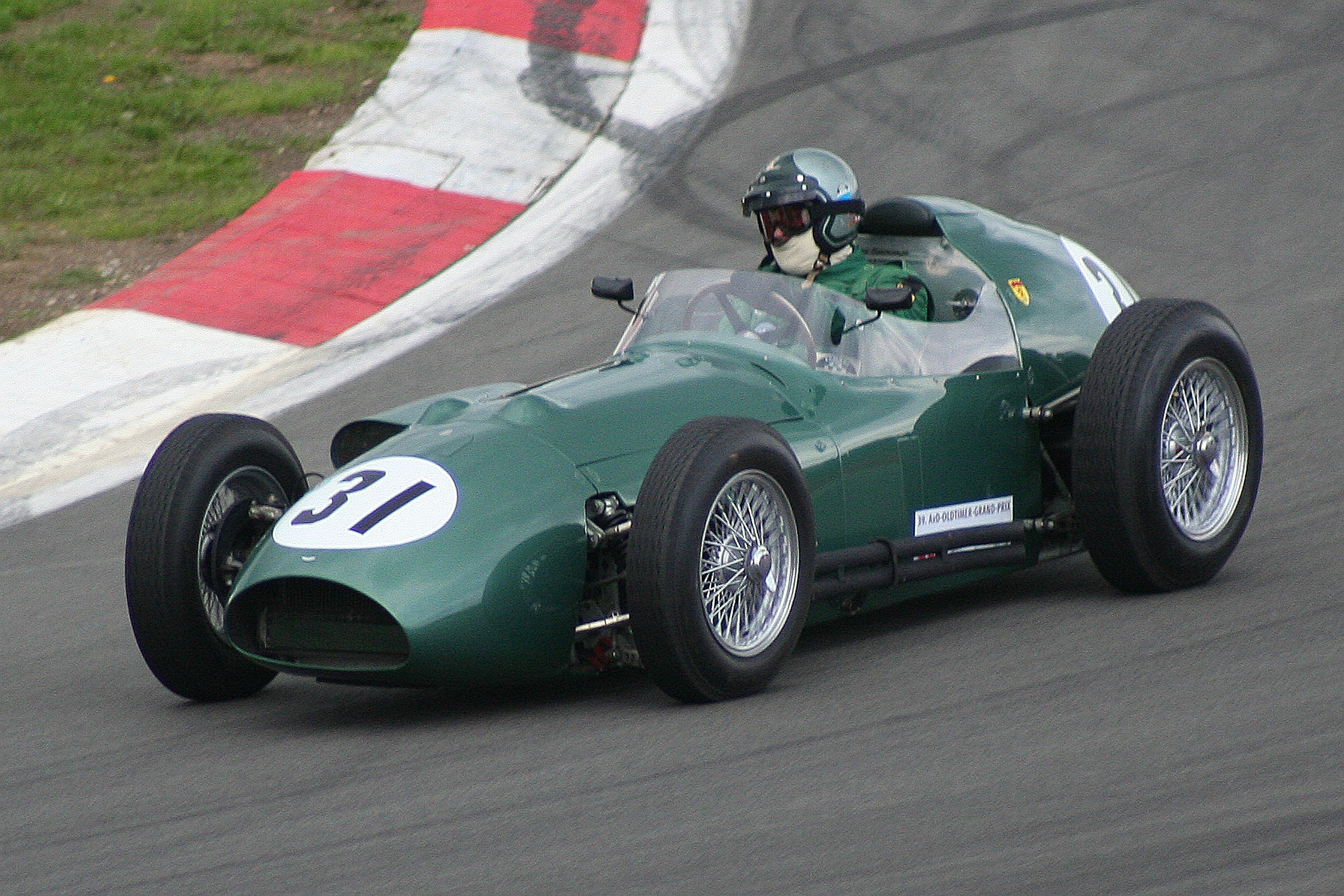
Aston Martin debuted in F1 with average results but no championship points.

- Vanwall owner Tony Vandervell's health declined, which meant 1958 was their last full season. The team would enter a handful of races in the following years, of which just one in 1959. Ex-driver Stirling Moss moved to Rob Walker Racing Team, racing a private Cooper.
- Scuderia Ferrari started the season with a fresh line-up: 1958 champion Mike Hawthorn had retired from racing, Wolfgang von Trips moved to the new Porsche works team, and Olivier Gendebien went to focus on sports car and endurance racing. Joining the team were Jean Behra from BRM, Tony Brooks from Vanwall, and Cliff Allison from Lotus.
- After trying out their mid-engine 1500cc Porsche 550A and Porsche 718 sports cars with closed bodywork in a couple of proper Formula Two races and in the 1957 German Grand Prix that combined F1 and F2, the Porsche works team entered their cars in a proper F1 race despite having no 2500cc engine, just he 1500cc Porsche 547 engine "Fuhrmann" four cylinder. This year, it would only be the Monaco Grand Prix, and in 1960, just the Italian Grand Prix. After that, however, with 1500cc F2 becoming the F1 capacity limit in 1961, they would go for two full-time seasons.
- Lotus replaced Cliff Allison with Pete Lovely.
- Cooper signed Masten Gregory to replace Roy Salvadori, who found a part-time seat at the new Aston Martin works team. He was joined by Carroll Shelby, who had made his debut in 1958 as Gregory's teammate at several private Maserati teams.

==== Mid-season changes ====
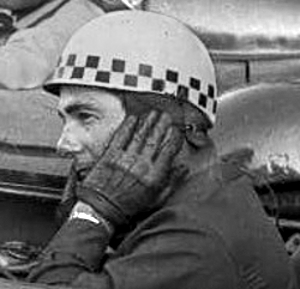
Jean Behra suffered a fatal accident ahead of the German Grand Prix.

- After two disappointing results, most notable his failure to qualify for the Monaco Grand Prix, Lotus driver Pete Lovely was sacked and replaced by successful sports car driver Innes Ireland. (After one more attempt in 1960, Lovely would wait until 1969 to make his return with money from his Volkswagen dealership.) Ireland was replaced by Alan Stacey in the British Grand Prix due to illness.
- After two races, Stirling Moss moved from Rob Walker Racing Team to BRP. After another two races, he moved back.
- Jean Behra was sacked by Scuderia Ferrari after the French Grand Prix as a result of punching team manager Romolo Tavoni and another patron at a restaurant when a discussion got heated. Behra would race for the works Porsche, in which he had also taken up a managing role. However, he crashed his Porsche 718 RSK in the sports car race that supported the German Grand Prix at Berlin AVUS. His car went over the top of the banked corner and Behra incurred a skull fracture when he struck a flagpole with his head. Porsche withdrew the team for the remainder of the season.
- During the German Grand Prix, BRP driver Hans Herrmann lost his brakes and had a spectacular crash. He was thrown out and slid along the track while his car somersaulted multiple times. BRP withdrew the team for the remainder of the season.
- Hermann's teammate Ivor Bueb died when he crashed during a Formula Two race at the Charade Circuit.
- Cooper driver Masten Gregory missed the last two races because of an accident in another championship. He jumped out of his Jaguar before the impact, but sustained a broken leg and shoulder in his fall. Maserati driver Giorgio Scarlatti substituted for him in the Italian Grand Prix.

== Calendar ==
Round	Grand Prix	Circuit	Date
1	Monaco Grand Prix	Circuit de Monaco, Monte Carlo	10 May
2	Indianapolis 500	(United States) Indianapolis Motor Speedway, Speedway	30 May (Note: The Indianapolis 500 also counted towards the 1959 USAC National Championship Trail, and was run for USAC Championship cars, but did not count towards the International Cup for F1 Manufacturers.)
3	Dutch Grand Prix	(Netherlands) Circuit Zandvoort, Zandvoort	31 May
4	French Grand Prix	(France) Reims-Gueux, Gueux	5 July
5	British Grand Prix	(United Kingdom) Aintree Motor Racing Circuit, Merseyside	18 July
6	German Grand Prix	(West Germany) AVUS, Berlin	2 August
7	Portuguese Grand Prix	(Portugal) Monsanto Park Circuit, Lisbon	23 August
8	Italian Grand Prix	(Italy) Autodromo Nazionale di Monza, Monza	13 September
9	United States Grand Prix	(United States) Sebring International Raceway, Highlands County, Florida	12 December

=== Calendar changes ===
- The United States Grand Prix was organised for the first time: Sebring International Raceway hosted the season finale on 12 December.
- The British Grand Prix was moved from Silverstone to Aintree, in keeping with the event-sharing arrangement between the two circuits.
- The German Grand Prix was moved from the Nürburgring to AVUS.
- The Portuguese Grand Prix was moved from Circuito da Boavista to Monsanto Park Circuit.
- The Argentine Grand Prix was originally scheduled for 25 January but was cancelled after local heroes Juan Manuel Fangio and Jose Froilan Gonzalez had retired and local interest faded.
- The Belgian Grand Prix was originally scheduled for 14 June, but it was cancelled due to a dispute over start money.
- The Moroccan Grand Prix was originally scheduled for 1 October but it was cancelled because of monetary reasons.

== Championship report ==
=== Rounds 1 to 4 ===
With the Argentine Grand Prix gone, the season began at the latest point in the year since 1952, with the Monaco Grand Prix on 10 May 1959. Jean Behra for Ferrari, Jack Brabham for Cooper and Stirling Moss, driving a Cooper for Rob Walker, were fighting for pole position. It was Moss who set the fastest time in the end, with Behra and Brabham within half a second in second and third. On race day, Behra had the best start and went round the outside of Moss through the first hairpin. The lone works Porsche, driven by Wolfgang von Trips, spun on some oil on the second lap and was collected by three other drivers. The leading trio were nose-to-tail until, on lap 22, Behra's Ferrari developed an oil leak and retired. At half distance, only eight cars were left running, with Moss at a sizeable lead over Brabham and Tony Brooks, third in the championship last year. On lap 81, however, Moss sensed a vibration and visited the pits. Nothing was visibly wrong, so he rejoined in the lead, but later that lap, his transmission failed and his race was over. This left Brabham (Cooper) to claim his first career podium and win, 20 seconds ahead of Brooks (Ferrari) and two laps ahead of veteran racer and last year's Monaco winner Maurice Trintignant (Cooper).

The Indianapolis 500 saw Rodger Ward take his first of two career victories. There was no overlap between the Indy 500 and F1 drivers. It would be the penultimate year in which the race counted towards the F1 championship.

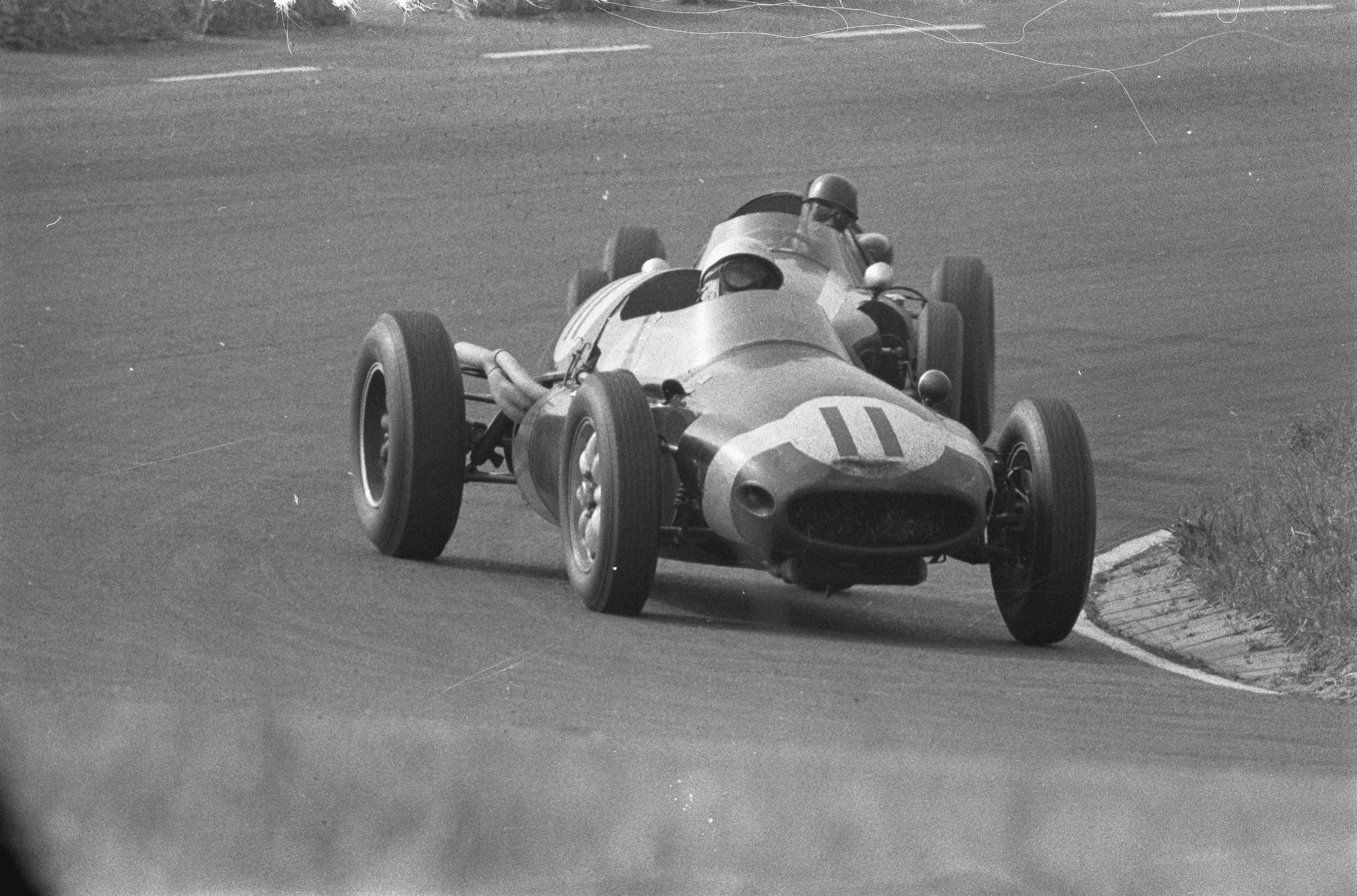
Stirling Moss (front) took the lead of the Dutch Grand Prix from Jo Bonnier (back), but soon after, he retired with mechanical woes, giving the Swede his maiden win.

For the Dutch Grand Prix, Jo Bonnier, driving for the BRM works team, clinched his first career pole, ahead of Brabham, who achieved the same lap time but at a later moment, and Moss, two tenths behind. Bonnier held the lead at the start, but lost it on the second lap to seventh-starting Masten Gregory. On lap 12, Gregory's Cooper started jumping out of gear, so Bonnier went by. Brabham inherited second place and then challenged the Swede for the lead, but then had to manage similar problems to his teammate. Aston Martin were making their debut this race, but both cars soon retired with engine failure. Meanwhile, Moss was up to third place and the fastest man on track. He passed Brabham on lap 49 by out-braking him into Tarzan corner and then grabbed the lead on lap 60 when Bonnier was held up by a backmarker. A mere three laps later, however, the Cooper's transmission failed, causing Moss to retire from the lead for the second time in a row. Bonnier scored his first and only career win, ahead of Brabham and Gregory.

The French Grand Prix received the honorary title of European Grand Prix and was contested on the public highways around Reims. The Ferrari team entered five cars and their high-speed advantage put three of them on the first two rows of the grid. Pole position was for Brooks, ahead of championship leader Brabham and Ferrari teammate Phil Hill. Fifth-starting Moss, who had moved to the BRP team, passed three cars into the first corner, but was overtaken himself by seventh-starting Gregory. On lap 6, Trintignant, in the surprisingly quick Cooper, was the next driver to grab second place. Gregory retired when he was overcome by the summer heat, which reached 44 °C (111 °F) in the sun. His team then saw that the American's face was cut by the bitumen and stones that were becoming dislodged. Ron Flockhart took a stone to the eye but raced on to take sixth place. Graham Hill retired when one of those rocks went through his radiator. While Trintignant stopped to cool off, Bonnier's engine had seized, but the Swede pushed his car a full kilometer back to the pits. At the front, Brooks was leading Hill and Brabham and that became the order at the finish. Moss got up to second briefly but then retired when his clutch failed. He asked for a push start from bystanders, knowing that it would get him disqualified, but longing for the shade of the garages.

In the Drivers' Championship, Jack Brabham (Cooper) was leading with 19 points, ahead of Tony Brooks (Ferrari) with 14 and Phil Hill (Ferrari) with 9. In the Manufacturers' Championship, Cooper was leading with 18 points, ahead of Ferrari with 16 and BRM with 8.

=== Rounds 5 to 8 ===
The Ferrari team did not compete in the British Grand Prix over labour disputes back in Italy. Tony Brooks borrowed a Vanwall from his old team boss to, at least theoretically, be able to challenge Jack Brabham for the lead in the championship. Brabham took pole position in his Cooper, ahead of Roy Salvadori in the Aston Martin, who set the same time but at a later moment, and Harry Schell in the BRM. Salvadori went down to ninth at the start and Brooks, from his seventeenth starting place, fell even further. Brabham held the lead ahead of Schell and Bonnier. After ten laps, Stirling Moss had gotten up to second place and on lap 25, Bruce McLaren went up to third, and so stayed the order until the finish. McLaren had managed to get side-by-side with Moss and finished two tenths of a second behind.

Instead of the traditional Nürburgring, the German Grand Prix was held at the AVUS circuit, which consisted of two Autobahn straights of 3.5 km (2.2 mi), linked together by a hairpin at one end and a 43 degre banked turn at the other. With fears about tyre safety, the Grand Prix was separated into two heats of one hour, adding the drivers' times together, and streamlining was forbidden by stipulating that all cars had to have the front wheels exposed at all times. In the supporting sports car race, it was the rain that caused peril: three of the leading Porsches crashed out, of which Jean Behra came off worst. His car flew over the banking, his head struck a flagpole and the Frenchman was killed. In a gloomy atmosphere, Brooks took pole position for the Grand Prix, ahead of Moss and Gurney. Fifth-starting Gregory was up to second after the first hairpin and Moss retired soon after with a failing transmission. Championship leader Brabham retired with the same issue. The remaining Coopers and Ferraris seemed equally strong and the lead switch hands multiple times, until the Climax engine broke and Gregory coasted to a standstill. Ferrari was 1-2-3 at the end of the first heat. After a short break to change tyres and mend some damage, nine cars were left to start the second heat. BRP driver Hans Herrmann lost his brakes and had a spectacular crash. He was thrown out and slid along the track while his car somersaulted multiple times. The red cars from Italy showed their dominance, taking an easy victory and completing a victory lap three-abreast. After adding up the heats, Brooks was given the victory, three seconds ahead of Gurney and a minute ahead of Hill.

The Portuguese Grand Prix was run on the much appraised Monsanto road course, and the twisty nature of the track gave the advantage to the lightweight Coopers: Moss qualified on pole, ahead of the two works drivers, Brabham and Gregory, and then came teammate Trintignant. Gurney was the first Ferrari in sixth. Eight-starting McLaren, the third works Cooper driver, joined the leading pack after the first lap. On lap 5, Phil Hill collided with Graham Hill and both retired on the spot. Moss was the fastest man on track, as he had been so many times, and this time, his car held on for him to take the win, a lap ahead of Gregory. Gurney had managed to get by Trintignant to take third. Brabham had crashed heavily on lap 24, but walked away unhurt, and McLaren retired with transmission failure.

Even at Monza, the track synonymous with speed, the Cooper team was giving home favourite Ferrari a run for their money. Moss took pole, ahead of Brooks and Brabham. Brooks had a bad start and a piston broke, causing him to retire immediately. Moss let fifth-starting Hill by into the lead, to follow the Ferrari and conserve his tyres. Gurney completed the leading trio and positions changed every lap. Moss's plan worked, as Hill and Gurney had to change tyres on lap 33 and 34, so the only remaining fear was for his Cooper to let him down. But it held on, Moss even lapped the Ferrari of Cliff Allison, and took the win, ahead of Hill and Brabham.

With one round to go, the Drivers' Championship had seen Jack Brabham (Cooper) in the lead since the beginning. The Australian had gathered 31 points. But Stirling Moss (Cooper) and Tony Brooks had scored two wins, just like Brabham, and were following on 25.5 and 23 points, respectively. In the Manufacturers' Championship, Cooper was leading with 38 points, ahead of Ferrari with 32 and BRM with 18.

=== Round 9 ===
The first United States Grand Prix was held at Sebring International Raceway, combining two runways of the regional airport and a series of technical corners. For the first time since 1951, three drivers were in contention for the title going into the final race. Jack Brabham would be the champion if he won the race. If he would not win, he would at least have to finish ahead of Stirling Moss and Tony Brooks. Meanwhile, Moss had to finish at least second with Brabham behind him. Brooks, because of his eight-point deficit, would simply have to win, while hoping for his rivals' misfortune. Moss took pole position, ahead of Brabham and Harry Schell, making it three Coopers on the front row. Brooks had to pit after the first lap, because his teammate Von Trips had rear-ended him, giving him no more realistic chances for the title. In five laps, Moss achieved a lead of ten seconds over Brabham, before his gearbox packed up and he coasted to a halt. After four years of finishing in second place, he would be denied the championship once again. Brabham and teammate McLaren ran to the finish as a solid duo, although Moss's teammate Trintignant was putting some real pressure on. A mere mile from the finish, drama ensued as Brabham ran out of fuel and McLaren went by to take the win, half a second ahead of Trintignant. With Moss out and Brooks not winning (he would finish third), the championship was sealed, but Brabham wanted to finish strong and started pushing his car towards the line. Five minutes after his teammate, he crossed the line to the cheers of the crowd. He was classified as fourth, as the three remaining runners were still multiple laps behind.

Jack Brabham, driving for Cooper, won his first Drivers' Championship with 31 points, ahead of Tony Brooks (Ferrari) with 27 and Stirling Moss (Cooper) with 25.5. Cooper won their first Manufacturers' Championship with 40 points, ahead of Ferrari with 32 and BRM with 18.

== Results and standings ==
=== Grands Prix ===
Round	Grand Prix	Pole position	Fastest lap	Winning driver	Winning constructor	Tyre	Report
1	Monaco Grand Prix	(United Kingdom) Stirling Moss	(Australia) Jack Brabham	(Australia) Jack Brabham	(United Kingdom) Cooper-Climax	D	Report
2	(United States) Indianapolis 500	(United States) Johnny Thomson	(United States) Johnny Thomson	(United States) Rodger Ward	(United States) Watson-Offenhauser	F	Report
3	(Netherlands) Dutch Grand Prix	(Sweden) Jo Bonnier	(United Kingdom) Stirling Moss	(Sweden) Jo Bonnier	(United Kingdom) BRM	D	Report
4	(France) French Grand Prix	(United Kingdom) Tony Brooks	(United Kingdom) Stirling Moss	(United Kingdom) Tony Brooks	(Italy) Ferrari	D	Report
5	(United Kingdom) British Grand Prix	(Australia) Jack Brabham	(United Kingdom) Stirling Moss (New Zealand) Bruce McLaren	(Australia) Jack Brabham	(United Kingdom) Cooper-Climax	D	Report
6	(West Germany) German Grand Prix	(United Kingdom) Tony Brooks	(United Kingdom) Tony Brooks	(United Kingdom) Tony Brooks	(Italy) Ferrari	D	Report
7	(Portugal) Portuguese Grand Prix	(United Kingdom) Stirling Moss	(United Kingdom) Stirling Moss	(United Kingdom) Stirling Moss	(United Kingdom) Cooper-Climax	D	Report
8	(Italy) Italian Grand Prix	(United Kingdom) Stirling Moss	(United States) Phil Hill	(United Kingdom) Stirling Moss	(United Kingdom) Cooper-Climax	D	Report
9	United States Grand Prix	(United Kingdom) Stirling Moss	(France) Maurice Trintignant	(New Zealand) Bruce McLaren	(United Kingdom) Cooper-Climax	D	Report

=== Scoring system ===
Points were awarded to the top five classified finishers, with an additional point awarded for setting the fastest lap, regardless of finishing position or even classification. Only the best five results counted towards the championship. No points were awarded for shared drives. If more than one driver set the same fastest lap time, the fastest lap point would be divided equally between the drivers.

The International Cup for F1 Manufacturers only counted the points of the highest-finishing driver for each race, although fastest lap points were not counted. Indy 500 results did not count towards the cup. Additionally, like the Drivers' Championship, only the best five results counted towards the cup.

Numbers without parentheses are championship points, from the best five results; numbers in parentheses are total points scored. Points were awarded in the following system:

Position	1st	2nd	3rd	4th	5th	FL
Race	8	6	4	3	2	1

=== World Drivers' Championship standings ===
Pos.	Driver	MON (Monaco)	500 (United States)	NED (Netherlands)	FRA (France)	GBR (United Kingdom)	GER (West Germany)	POR (Portugal)	ITA (Italy)	USA (United States)	Pts. (Note: Only the best 5 results counted towards the championship. Numbers without parentheses are championship points; numbers in parentheses are total points scored.)
1	(Australia) Jack Brabham	1^{F}		2	3	1^{P}	Ret	Ret	3	(4)	31 (34)
2	(United Kingdom) Tony Brooks	2		Ret	1^{P}	Ret	1^{P}^{F}	9	Ret	3	27
3	(United Kingdom) Stirling Moss	Ret^{P}		Ret^{F}	DSQ^{F}	2^{F}	Ret	1^{P}^{F}	1^{P}	Ret^{P}	25.5
4	(United States) Phil Hill	4		6	2		3	Ret	2^{F}	Ret	20
5	(France) Maurice Trintignant	3		8	11	5	4	4	9	2^{F}	19
6	(New Zealand) Bruce McLaren	5			5	3^{F}	Ret	Ret	Ret	1	16.5
7	(United States) Dan Gurney				Ret		2	3	4		13
8	(Sweden) Jo Bonnier	Ret		1^{P}	Ret	Ret	5	Ret	8		10
9	(United States) Masten Gregory	Ret		3	Ret	7	Ret	2			10
10	(United States) Rodger Ward		1							Ret	8
11	(United States) Jim Rathmann		2								6
12	(United States) Johnny Thomson		3^{P}^{F}								5
13	(United States) Harry Schell	Ret		Ret	7	4	7	5	7	Ret	5
14	(United Kingdom) Innes Ireland			4	Ret		Ret	Ret	Ret	5	5
15	(Belgium) Olivier Gendebien				4				6		3
16	(United States) Tony Bettenhausen		4								3
17	(United Kingdom) Cliff Allison	Ret		9			Ret		5	Ret	2
18	(France) Jean Behra	Ret		5	Ret		DNS				2
19	(United States) Paul Goldsmith		5								2
—	(United Kingdom) Roy Salvadori	6		Ret	Ret	6		6	Ret	Ret	0
—	(United Kingdom) Ron Flockhart	Ret			6	Ret		7	13		0
—	(United Kingdom) Ian Burgess				Ret	Ret	6		14		0
—	(West Germany) Wolfgang von Trips	Ret					DNS			6	0
—	(United States) Johnny Boyd		6								0
—	(United Kingdom) Graham Hill	Ret		7	Ret	9	Ret	Ret	Ret		0
—	(United States) Duane Carter		7								0
—	(United States) Harry Blanchard									7	0
—	(United States) Carroll Shelby			Ret		Ret		8	10		0
—	(Italy) Giorgio Scarlatti	DNQ			8				12		0
—	(United Kingdom) Alan Stacey					8				Ret	0
—	(United States) Eddie Johnson		8								0
—	(Netherlands) Carel Godin de Beaufort			10	9						0
—	(United States) Paul Russo		9								0
—	(Brazil) Fritz d'Orey				10	Ret				Ret	0
—	(United States) A. J. Foyt		10								0
—	(United Kingdom) Chris Bristow					10					0
—	(Portugal) Mario de Araujo Cabral							10			0
—	(United Kingdom) Colin Davis				Ret				11		0
—	(United States) Gene Hartley		11								0
—	(United Kingdom) Henry Taylor					11					0
—	(United States) Bob Veith		12								0
—	(United Kingdom) Peter Ashdown					12					0
—	(United States) Al Herman		13								0
—	(United Kingdom) Ivor Bueb	DNQ				13					0
—	(United States) Jimmy Daywalt		14								0
—	(United States) Chuck Arnold		15								0
—	(Italy) Giulio Cabianca								15		0
—	(United States) Jim McWithey		16								0
—	(West Germany) Hans Herrmann					Ret	Ret				0
—	(United Kingdom) Jack Fairman					Ret			Ret		0
—	(United Kingdom) Bruce Halford	Ret									0
—	(United States) Eddie Sachs		Ret								0
—	(United States) Al Keller		Ret								0
—	(United States) Pat Flaherty		Ret								0
—	(United States) Dick Rathmann		Ret								0
—	(United States) Bill Cheesbourg		Ret								0
—	(United States) Don Freeland		Ret								0
—	(United States) Ray Crawford		Ret								0
—	(United States) Don Branson		Ret								0
—	(United States) Bob Christie		Ret								0
—	(United States) Bobby Grim		Ret								0
—	(United States) Jack Turner		Ret								0
—	(United States) Chuck Weyant		Ret								0
—	(United States) Jud Larson		Ret								0
—	(United States) Mike Magill		Ret								0
—	(United States) Red Amick		Ret								0
—	(United States) Len Sutton		Ret								0
—	(United States) Jimmy Bryan		Ret								0
—	(United Kingdom) Brian Naylor					Ret					0
—	(United Kingdom) David Piper					Ret					0
—	(United Kingdom) Mike Taylor					Ret					0
—	(Argentina) Alejandro de Tomaso									Ret	0
—	(United States) George Constantine									Ret	0
—	(United States) Bob Said									Ret	0
—	(Belgium) Alain de Changy	DNQ									0
—	(Belgium) Lucien Bianchi	DNQ									0
—	(Italy) Maria Teresa de Filippis	DNQ									0
—	(United States) Pete Lovely	DNQ									0
—	(France) Jean Lucienbonnet	DNQ									0
—	(Monaco) André Testut	DNQ									0
—	(United Kingdom) Bill Moss					DNQ					0
—	(United Kingdom) Keith Greene					DNQ					0
—	(United Kingdom) Mike Parkes					DNQ					0
—	(United Kingdom) Trevor Taylor					DNQ					0
—	(United Kingdom) Dennis Taylor					DNQ					0
—	(United Kingdom) Tim Parnell					DNQ					0
—	(Uruguay) Asdrúbal Fontes Bayardo				DNS						0
—	(United States) Phil Cade									DNS	0
Pos.	Driver	MON (Monaco)	500 (United States)	NED (Netherlands)	FRA (France)	GBR (United Kingdom)	GER (West Germany)	POR (Portugal)	ITA (Italy)	USA (United States)	Pts.

Key
Colour	Result
Gold	Winner
Silver	Second place
Bronze	Third place
Green	Other points position
Blue	Other classified position
Blue	Not classified, finished (NC)
Purple	Not classified, retired (Ret)
Red	Did not qualify (DNQ)
Red	Did not pre-qualify (DNPQ)
Black	Disqualified (DSQ)
White	Did not start (DNS)
White	Race cancelled (C)
Blank	Did not practice (DNP)
Blank	Excluded (EX)
Blank	Did not arrive (DNA)
Blank	Withdrawn (WD)
Blank	Did not enter (cell empty)
Text formatting	Meaning
**Bold**	Pole position
Italics	Fastest lap

- Italics indicates the fastest lap (One point awarded – point shared equally between drivers sharing fastest lap)
- **Bold** indicates pole position

=== International Cup for F1 Manufacturers standings ===
Pos.	Manufacturer	MON (Monaco)	NED (Netherlands)	FRA (France)	GBR (United Kingdom)	GER (West Germany)	POR (Portugal)	ITA (Italy)	USA (United States)	Pts.
1	(United Kingdom) Cooper-Climax	**1**	(2)	(3)	**1**	(4)	**1**	**1**	**1**	40 (53)
2	(Italy) Ferrari	**2**	(5)	**1**		**1**	**3**	**2**	(3)	32 (38)
3	(United Kingdom) BRM	Ret	**1**	6	**2**	**5**	**5**	7		18
4	(United Kingdom) Lotus-Climax	Ret	**4**	Ret	8	Ret	Ret	Ret	**5**	5
—	(United Kingdom) Cooper-Maserati	6		Ret	Ret	6	10	11	Ret	0
—	(United Kingdom) Aston Martin		Ret		6		6	10		0
—	(West Germany) Porsche	Ret	10			DNS			7	0
—	(Italy) Maserati	DNQ		8	Ret	WD	WD	15	DNS	0
—	(United Kingdom) Cooper-Borgward				10					0
—	(United Kingdom) JBW-Maserati				Ret					0
—	(United Kingdom) Vanwall				Ret					0
—	(United States) Kurtis Kraft-Offenhauser								Ret	0
—	(United Kingdom) Cooper-OSCA								Ret	0
—	(Italy) Tec-Mec-Maserati								Ret	0
—	(United Kingdom) Connaught-Alta				WD				Ret	0
—	(France) Behra-Porsche-Porsche	DNQ				DNS				0
—	(United Kingdom) Fry-Climax				DNQ					0
Pos.	Manufacturer	MON (Monaco)	NED (Netherlands)	FRA (France)	GBR (United Kingdom)	GER (West Germany)	POR (Portugal)	ITA (Italy)	USA (United States)	Pts.

- **Bold** results counted to championship totals.

=== Non-championship races ===
Five Formula One races which did not count towards the World Championship were held in 1959.

Race Name	Circuit	Date	Winning driver	Constructor	Report
(United Kingdom) VII Glover Trophy	Goodwood	30 March	(United Kingdom) Stirling Moss	(United Kingdom) Cooper-Climax	Report
(United Kingdom) XIV BARC Aintree 200	Aintree	18 April	(France) Jean Behra	(Italy) Ferrari	Report
(United Kingdom) XI BRDC International Trophy	Silverstone	2 May	(Australia) Jack Brabham	(United Kingdom) Cooper-Climax	Report
(United Kingdom) VI International Gold Cup	Oulton Park	26 September	(United Kingdom) Stirling Moss	(United Kingdom) Cooper-Climax	Report
(United Kingdom) IV Silver City Trophy	Snetterton	10 October	(United Kingdom) Ron Flockhart	(United Kingdom) BRM	Report
