= 1959 Indianapolis 500 =

American motor race

43rd Indianapolis 500
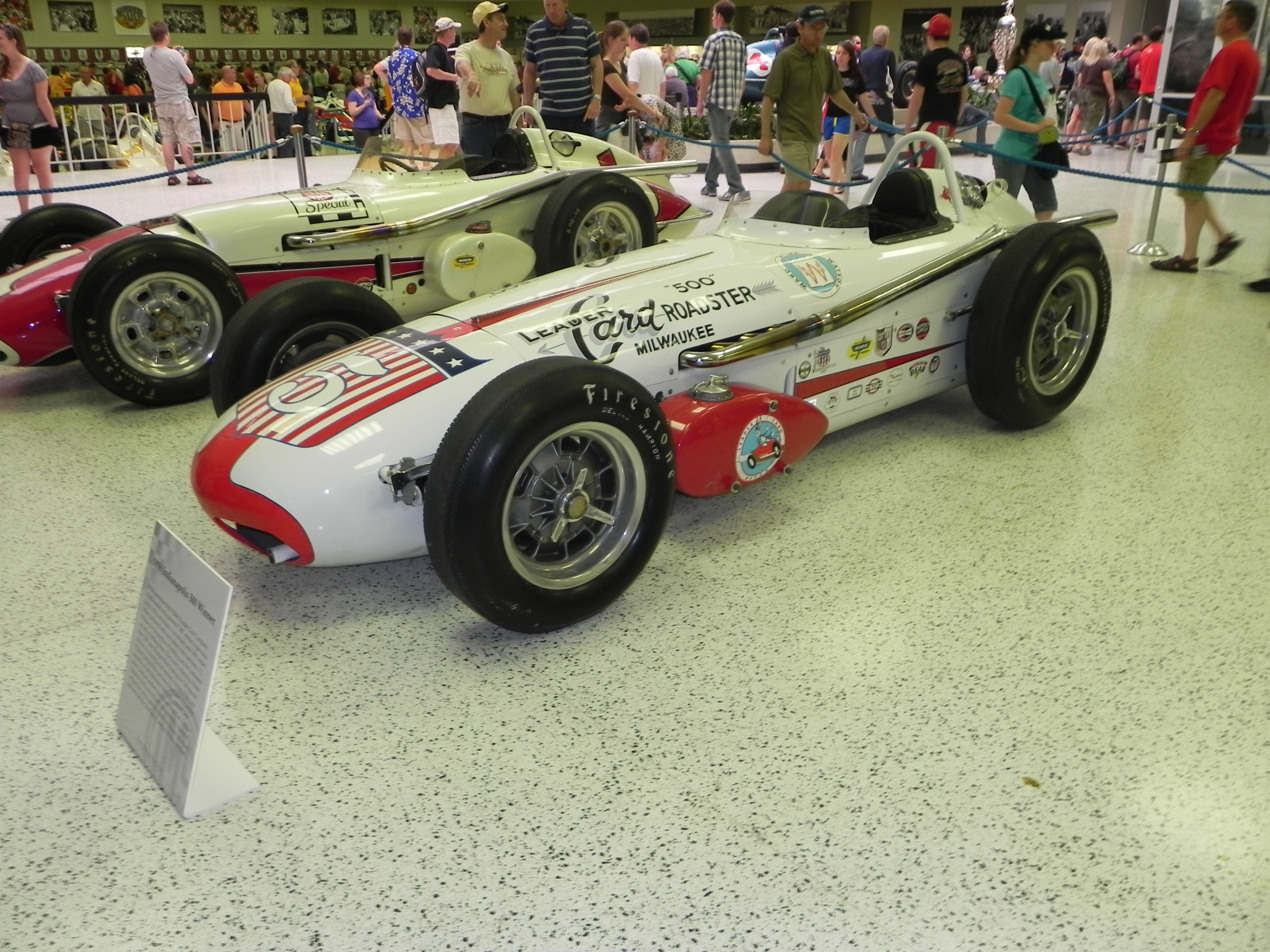

Indianapolis Motor Speedway

Indianapolis 500
- Sanctioning body: USAC
- Date: May 30, 1959
- Winner: Rodger Ward
- Winning team: Leader Card Racers
- Winning Chief Mechanic: A. J. Watson
- Time of race: 3:40:49.20
- Average speed: 135.857 mph (218.641 km/h)
- Pole position: Johnny Thomson
- Pole speed: 145.908 mph (234.816 km/h)
- Most laps led: Rodger Ward (130)

Pre-race ceremonies
- Pace car: Buick Electra 225
- Pace car driver: Sam Hanks
- Starter: Bill Vanderwater
- Honorary referee: Vernon Bellman
- Estimated attendance: 180,000

Chronology
Previous	Next
1958	1960

The 43rd International 500-Mile Sweepstakes was held at the Indianapolis Motor Speedway on Saturday, May 30, 1959. The event was part of the 1959 USAC National Championship Trail and was also race 2 of 9 in the 1959 World Championship of Drivers.

Rodger Ward earned the first of two career Indy 500 victories. A record sixteen cars completed the full 500 miles.

All cars were required to have roll bars for the first time.

== Practice and time trials ==
Two drivers, Jerry Unser and Bob Cortner, were killed in separate crashes during the month. On May 2, Unser lost control in Turn Four, spun, and flipped down the main stretch. The car caught fire and Unser suffered significant burns; he died from complications of his burns on May 17. On May 19, rookie Cortner crashed in turn three after being pushed by a wind gust. He was killed instantly of head injuries.

On the morning of pole day, Tony Bettenhausen suffered a bad crash during a practice run. His car hit the outside wall and flipped over the inside guardrail. Bettenhausen escaped the crash with only minor injuries, and would qualify on the second weekend of time trials.

After three years of retirement, Duane Carter returned to the cockpit, and qualified for his ninth Indianapolis 500 start.

Time trials were scheduled for four days:

- Saturday May 16 – Pole Day time trials
- Sunday May 17 – Second day time trials
- Saturday May 23 – Third day time trials
- Sunday May 24 – Fourth day time trials

== Starting grid ==
Row	Inside		Middle		Outside	
1	3	(United States) Johnny Thomson	44	(United States) Eddie Sachs	16	(United States) Jim Rathmann
2	73	(United States) Dick Rathmann	48	(United States) Bobby Grim R	5	(United States) Rodger Ward
3	74	(United States) Bob Veith	19	(United States) Eddie Johnson	88	(United States) Gene Hartley
4	9	(United States) Don Branson R	33	(United States) Johnny Boyd	37	(United States) Duane Carter
5	66	(United States) Jimmy Daywalt	24	(United States) Jack Turner	1	(United States) Tony Bettenhausen
6	99	(United States) Paul Goldsmith	10	(United States) A. J. Foyt	64	(United States) Pat Flaherty W
7	7	(United States) Jud Larson	6	(United States) Jimmy Bryan W	71	(United States) Chuck Arnold R
8	8	(United States) Len Sutton	89	(United States) Al Herman	65	(United States) Bob Christie
9	15	(United States) Don Freeland	87	(United States) Red Amick R	45	(United States) Paul Russo
10	57	(United States) Al Keller	47	(United States) Chuck Weyant	53	(United States) Bill Cheesbourg
11	77	(United States) Mike Magill	49	(United States) Ray Crawford	58	(United States) Jim McWithey R

R Indianapolis 500 rookie
W Indianapolis 500 winner

=== Alternates ===
- First alternate: Rex Easton R (#39, #45)

=== Failed to qualify ===
- Russ Congdon R (#72) - Did not finish rookie test
- Bob Cortner R (#51) - Fatal accident
- Chuck Daigh R (#98)
- Jimmy Davies (#53)
- Don Edmunds (#54, #57, #76)
- Jack Ensley R (#92)
- Gene Force (#55, #78)
- Andy Furci R (#91)
- Elmer George (#21)
- Bill Homeier (#42, #62)
- Van Johnson R (#76, #91)
- Johnny Kay R (#17) - Did not finish rookie test
- Ralph Ligouri R (#12, #41)
- Johnny Moorhouse R (#91)
- Earl Motter R (#21)
- Jim Packard R (#55)
- Johnnie Parsons W (#45)
- Chuck Rodee R (#82)
- Eddie Russo (#1, #78, #93, #98)
- Bob Schroeder R (#78)
- Shorty Templeman (#69, #76)
- Johnnie Tolan (#43)
- Jerry Unser (#57) - Fatal accident
- Wayne Weiler R (#39) - Entry declined, failed physical
- Dempsey Wilson (#34, #82)

== Box score ==
Finish	Grid	No.	Driver	Constructor	Qualifying		Laps	Status	Points	
Finish	Grid	No.	Driver	Constructor	Speed	Rank	Laps	Status	USAC	WDC
1	6	5	(United States) Rodger Ward	Watson-Offenhauser	144.03	7	200	135.857 mph	1,000	8
2	3	16	(United States) Jim Rathmann	Watson-Offenhauser	144.43	4	200	+23.28	800	6
3	1	3	(United States) Johnny Thomson	Lesovsky-Offenhauser	145.90	1	200	+50.64	700	5^{1}
4	15	1	(United States) Tony Bettenhausen	Epperly-Offenhauser	142.72	18	200	+1:47.09	600	3
5	16	99	(United States) Paul Goldsmith	Epperly-Offenhauser	142.67	19	200	+2:06.44	500	2
6	11	33	(United States) Johnny Boyd	Epperly-Offenhauser	142.81	16	200	+3:16.98	400	
7	12	37	(United States) Duane Carter	Kurtis Kraft-Offenhauser	142.79	17	200	+4:09.92	300	
8	8	19	(United States) Eddie Johnson	Kurtis Kraft-Offenhauser	144.00	9	200	+4:10.53	250	
9	27	45	(United States) Paul Russo	Kurtis Kraft-Offenhauser	142.38	22	200	+4:11.04	200	
10	17	10	(United States) A. J. Foyt	Kuzma-Offenhauser	142.64	20	200	+4:14.48	150	
11	9	88	(United States) Gene Hartley	Kuzma-Offenhauser	143.57	10	200	+5:42.48	100	
12	7	74	(United States) Bob Veith	Moore-Offenhauser	144.02	8	200	+6:09.73	50	
13	23	89	(United States) Al Herman	Dunn-Offenhauser	141.93	29	200	+6:40.40		
14	13	66	(United States) Jimmy Daywalt	Kurtis Kraft-Offenhauser	144.68	3	200	+6:41.54		
15	21	71	(United States) Chuck Arnold R	Kurtis Kraft-Offenhauser	142.11	24	200	+8:19.86		
16	33	58	(United States) Jim McWithey R	Kurtis Kraft-Offenhauser	141.21	33	200	+11:41.69		
17	2	44	(United States) Eddie Sachs	Kuzma-Offenhauser	145.42	2	182	Spun off		
18	28	57	(United States) Al Keller	Kuzma-Offenhauser	142.05	27	163	Engine		
19	18	64	(United States) Pat Flaherty W	Watson-Offenhauser	142.39	21	162	Accident		
20	4	73	(United States) Dick Rathmann	Watson-Offenhauser	144.24	5	150	Fire		
21	30	53	(United States) Bill Cheesbourg	Kuzma-Offenhauser	141.78	30	147	Magneto		
22	25	15	(United States) Don Freeland	Kurtis Kraft-Offenhauser	143.05	14	136	Magneto		
23	32	49	(United States) Ray Crawford	Elder-Offenhauser	141.34	32	115	Accident		
24	10	9	(United States) Don Branson R	Phillips-Offenhauser	143.31	12	112	Suspension		
25	24	65	(United States) Bob Christie	Kurtis Kraft-Offenhauser	143.24	13	109	Engine		
26	5	48	(United States) Bobby Grim R	Kurtis Kraft-Offenhauser	144.22	6	85	Magneto		
27	14	24	(United States) Jack Turner	Christensen-Offenhauser	143.47	11	47	Fuel leak		
28	29	47	(United States) Chuck Weyant	Kurtis Kraft-Offenhauser	141.95	28	45	Accident		
29	19	7	(United States) Jud Larson	Kurtis Kraft-Offenhauser	142.29	23	45	Accident		
30	31	77	(United States) Mike Magill	Sutton-Offenhauser	141.48	31	45	Accident		
31	26	87	(United States) Red Amick R	Kurtis Kraft-Offenhauser	142.92	15	45	Accident		
32	22	8	(United States) Len Sutton	Lesovsky-Offenhauser	142.10	26	34	Accident		
33	20	6	(United States) Jimmy Bryan W	Salih-Offenhauser	142.11	25	1	Engine		

W Former Indianapolis 500 winner

R Indianapolis 500 Rookie

All entrants utilized Firestone tires.

Notes

- ^1 – Includes 1 point for fastest lead lap

=== Race statistics ===
Lap Leaders
Laps	Leader
1–4	Johnny Thomson
5–12	Rodger Ward
13	Jim Rathmann
14–16	Rodger Ward
17–30	Jim Rathmann
31	Pat Flaherty
32–33	Jim Rathmann
34–40	Pat Flaherty
41–42	Jim Rathmann
43–45	Pat Flaherty
46–48	Rodger Ward
49–84	Johnny Thomson
85–200	Rodger Ward

Total laps led
Driver	Laps
Rodger Ward	130
Johnny Thomson	40
Jim Rathmann	19
Pat Flaherty	11

Yellow Lights: 43 minutes, 17 seconds
Laps*	Reason
8–10	Eddie Sachs spin in turn 1 (2:25)
36–40	Len Sutton crash in turn 1 (5:42)
47–56	Weyant, Magil, Amick, Larson crash in turn 4 (11:15)
121–133	Ray Crawford crash in turn 3 (17:30)
167–173	Pat Flaherty crash on mainstretch (6:25)
* – Approximate lap counts

== Race notes ==
- Fastest lead lap: Johnny Thomson – 1:01.89
- Two drivers, Jerry Unser and Bob Cortner, were killed as a result of accidents during practice for this race.
- Bobby Grim qualified 5th and won the Rookie of the Year award despite dropping out of the race before the halfway point. On lap 85, he suffered magneto failure, and began coasting to the pits. As was customary for drivers of the time, he raised his arm to signify to the other drivers he had lost power. However, due to the high speed he was still traveling, he dislocated his arm in the process. Visibly in pain, the crew thought he was coming in for relief, and quickly Jack Turner jumped behind the wheel, but the car would not run.
- The first scoring pylon, a famous landmark of the Speedway, was constructed at the south end of the pit area.
- Last year's winner Jimmy Bryan using the same exact car that won the race in 1957 and 1958 fell out of the race being left on the grid with a clutch failure to finish last (33rd).
- Final Indianapolis 500 start for 1956 winner Pat Flaherty. He crashed out after completing 162 laps, finishing 19th.

== World Drivers' Championship ==
1959 Indianapolis 500
Race 2 of 9 in the 1959 Formula One season
← Previous race	Next race →

Race details
- Date: May 30, 1959
- Location: Indianapolis Motor Speedway; Speedway, Indiana
- Course: Permanent racing facility
- Course length: 4.023 km (2.500 miles)
- Distance: 200 laps, 804.672 km (500.000 miles)

=== Background ===
The Indianapolis 500 was included in the FIA World Championship of Drivers from 1950 through 1960. The race was sanctioned by AAA through 1955, and then by USAC beginning in 1956. At the time the new world championship was announced and first organized by the CSI, the United States did not yet have a Grand Prix. Indianapolis Motor Speedway vice president and general manager Theodore E. "Pop" Meyers lobbied that the Indianapolis 500 be selected as the race to represent the country and to pay points towards the world championship.

Drivers competing at the Indianapolis 500 in 1950 through 1960 were credited with participation in and earned points towards the World Championship of Drivers. However, the machines competing at Indianapolis were not necessarily run to Formula One specifications and regulations. The drivers also earned separate points (on a different scale) towards the respective AAA or USAC national championships. No points, however, were awarded by the FIA towards the World Constructors' Championship.

=== Summary ===
The 1959 Indianapolis 500 was round 2 of 9 on the 1959 World Championship. The event, however, failed to attract interest from any of the regular competitors on the Grand Prix circuit, particularly since it was held only one day prior to the Dutch Grand Prix. Race winner Rodger Ward earned 8 points towards the World Championship. Ward also competed in the U.S. Grand Prix at Sebring. He finished tenth in the final season standings.

==== World Drivers' Championship standings after the race ====
	Pos	Driver	Points
	1	(Australia) Jack Brabham	9
23	2	(United States) Rodger Ward	8
1	3	(United Kingdom) Tony Brooks	6
21	4	(United States) Jim Rathmann	6
20	5	(United States) Johnny Thomson	5

- Notes: Only the top five positions are included.

== Broadcasting ==
=== Radio ===
The race was carried live on the IMS Radio Network. Sid Collins served as chief announcer. Fred Agabashian joined the crew for the first time as "driver expert." The broadcast reached 385 affiliates, including Fairbanks, Alaska.

Indianapolis Motor Speedway Radio Network
Booth Announcers	Turn Reporters	Pit/garage reporters
Chief Announcer: Sid Collins; Driver expert: Fred Agabashian; Statistician: Charlie Brockman	Turn 1: Bill Frosh; Turn 2: John Peterson; Backstretch: Bernie Herman; Turn 3: Lou Palmer; Turn 4: Jim Shelton	Greg Smith (north); Jack Shapiro (center); Luke Walton (south)

Previous race: 1959 Monaco Grand Prix	FIA Formula One World Championship; 1959 season	Next race: 1959 Dutch Grand Prix
Previous race: 1958 Indianapolis 500; Jimmy Bryan	1959 Indianapolis 500; Rodger Ward	Next race: 1960 Indianapolis 500; Jim Rathmann
Preceded by 135.601 mph (1957 Indianapolis 500)	Record for the Indianapolis 500 fastest average speed 135.875 mph	Succeeded by 138.767 mph (1960 Indianapolis 500)
