= 1959 Dutch Grand Prix =

← Previous race	Next race →
- Zandvoort original layout

Race details
- Date: 31 May 1959
- Official name: VII Grote Prijs van Nederland
- Location: Circuit Park Zandvoort; Zandvoort, Netherlands
- Course: Permanent racing facility
- Course length: 4.193 km (2.605 miles)
- Distance: 75 laps, 314.475 km (195.406 miles)
- Weather: Sunny

Pole position
Driver	(Sweden) Jo Bonnier	BRM
- Time: 1:36.0

Fastest lap
Driver	(United Kingdom) Stirling Moss	Cooper-Climax
- Time: 1.36.6 on lap 42

Podium
First	(Sweden) Jo Bonnier	BRM
Second	(Australia) Jack Brabham	Cooper-Climax
Third	(United States) Masten Gregory	Cooper-Climax

The 1959 Dutch Grand Prix was a Formula One motor race held at Zandvoort on 31 May 1959. It was the ninth Dutch Grand Prix. The race was held over 75 laps of the four kilometre circuit for a race distance of 314 kilometres. It was race 3 of 9 in the 1959 World Championship of Drivers and race 2 of 8 in the 1959 International Cup for Formula One Manufacturers.

The race was won by Swedish driver Joakim Bonnier driving a front engine BRM P25, the last proper win of such a layout on a twisty track, as the remaining two front-engine GP wins in that year, 1959 French Grand Prix at Reims and 1959 German Grand Prix at AVUS in Berlin, occurred on high speed circuits where the engine power of Ferrari succeeded over the better handling and lower tyre wear of the mid-engine cars. Even the 1959 Italian Grand Prix at the regular flat Monza layout was won by a Cooper while the Ferrari had to pit. The very last front-engine win at the 1960 Italian Grand Prix was helped by the organizers choosing the high banking oval layout and the main British teams, having secured the championships, boycotting the race. The quality of the entrants was low, none of the participating drivers had won a GP before, not even those on the Ferrari factory team that dominated against sub-par F1 and F2 cars.

It would be the only World Championship victory of Bonnier's fifteen-year Grand Prix career. It was the first pole position and also the first win for the Owen Racing Organisation, the race team of the constructor BRM, and also the first pole position and win for a BRM-engine, after almost a decade of effort. Bonnier won by fifteen seconds over Australian driver Jack Brabham driving a Cooper T51, to become the first Swedish driver to win a Formula One Grand Prix. Brabham's American teammate Masten Gregory was the only other driver to finish on the lead lap in his Cooper T51 in third position.

Brabham's second position expanded his championship points lead with Bonnier now second along with the Indianapolis 500 winner Rodger Ward.

The organisers wanted to have a local driver in the race, so Carel Godin de Beaufort was allowed to compete despite his car being an underpowered Porsche RSK sports car.

== Classification ==
=== Qualifying ===
Pos	No	Driver	Constructor	Time	Gap
1	7	(Sweden) Jo Bonnier	BRM	1:36.0	—
2	8	(Australia) Jack Brabham	Cooper-Climax	1:36.0	+0.0
3	11	(United Kingdom) Stirling Moss	Cooper-Climax	1:36.2	+0.2
4	1	(France) Jean Behra	Ferrari	1:36.6	+0.6
5	14	(United Kingdom) Graham Hill	Lotus-Climax	1:36.7	+0.7
6	6	(United States) Harry Schell	BRM	1:37.3	+1.3
7	9	(United States) Masten Gregory	Cooper-Climax	1:37.6	+1.6
8	2	(United Kingdom) Tony Brooks	Ferrari	1:37.9	+1.9
9	12	(United Kingdom) Innes Ireland	Lotus-Climax	1:38.3	+2.3
10	5	(United States) Carroll Shelby	Aston Martin	1:38.5	+2.5
11	10	(France) Maurice Trintignant	Cooper-Climax	1:38.7	+2.7
12	3	(United States) Phil Hill	Ferrari	1:39.2	+3.2
13	4	(United Kingdom) Roy Salvadori	Aston Martin	1:39.7	+3.7
14	15	(Netherlands) Carel Godin de Beaufort	Porsche	1:44.5	+8.5
15	16	(United Kingdom) Cliff Allison	Ferrari		

=== Race ===
Pos	No	Driver	Constructor	Laps	Time/Retired	Grid	Points
1	7	(Sweden) Jo Bonnier	BRM	75	2:05:26.8	1	8
2	8	(Australia) Jack Brabham	Cooper-Climax	75	+ 14.2	2	6
3	9	(United States) Masten Gregory	Cooper-Climax	75	+ 1:23.0	7	4
4	12	(United Kingdom) Innes Ireland	Lotus-Climax	74	+ 1 Lap	9	3
5	1	(France) Jean Behra	Ferrari	74	+ 1 Lap	4	2
6	3	(United States) Phil Hill	Ferrari	73	+ 2 Laps	12	
7	14	(United Kingdom) Graham Hill	Lotus-Climax	73	+ 2 Laps	5	
8	10	(France) Maurice Trintignant	Cooper-Climax	73	+ 2 Laps	11	
9	16	(United Kingdom) Cliff Allison	Ferrari	71	+ 4 Laps	15	
10	15	(Netherlands) Carel Godin de Beaufort	Porsche	68	+ 7 Laps	14	
Ret	11	(United Kingdom) Stirling Moss	Cooper-Climax	62	Gearbox	3	1^{1}
Ret	6	(United States) Harry Schell	BRM	46	Gearbox	6	
Ret	2	(United Kingdom) Tony Brooks	Ferrari	42	Oil Leak	8	
Ret	5	(United States) Carroll Shelby	Aston Martin	25	Engine	10	
Ret	4	(United Kingdom) Roy Salvadori	Aston Martin	3	Engine	13	

Notes

- ^1 – 1 point for fastest lap

== Notes ==
- This was the Formula One World Championship debut for British driver and future Grand Prix winner Innes Ireland.
- This was Jo Bonnier's first and only pole position, Grand Prix win and podium. It was also the first pole position, Grand Prix win and podium for a Swedish driver. Lastly, this also marked the first pole position and Grand Prix win for BRM as a manufacturer and engine supplier.
- This was the Formula One World Championship debut for British manufacturer and engine supplier Aston Martin.

== Championship standings after the race ==
Drivers' Championship standings

	Pos	Driver	Points
	1	(Australia) Jack Brabham	15
21	2	(Sweden) Joakim Bonnier	8
1	3	(United States) Rodger Ward	8
1	4	(United Kingdom) Tony Brooks	6
1	5	(United States) Jim Rathmann	6

Constructors' Championship standings

	Pos	Constructor	Points
	1	(United Kingdom) Cooper-Climax	14
2	2	(United Kingdom) BRM	8
1	3	(Italy) Ferrari	8
	4	(United Kingdom) Lotus-Climax	3

- Notes: Only the top five positions are included for both sets of standings.

Previous race: 1959 Indianapolis 500	FIA Formula One World Championship; 1959 season	Next race: 1959 French Grand Prix
Previous race: 1958 Dutch Grand Prix	Dutch Grand Prix	Next race: 1960 Dutch Grand Prix
