= 1959 Portuguese Grand Prix =

← Previous race	Next race →
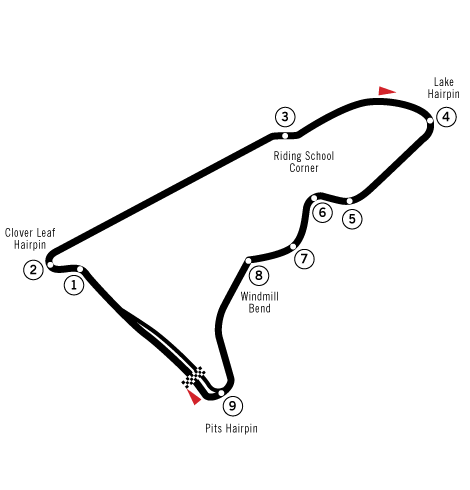

Race details
- Date: 23 August 1959
- Official name: VIII Portuguese Grand Prix
- Location: Circuito de Monsanto; Lisbon, Portugal
- Course: Public road
- Course length: 5.440 km (3.380 miles)
- Distance: 62 laps, 337.28 km (209.56 miles)
- Weather: Hot and clear.

Pole position
Driver	(United Kingdom) Stirling Moss	Cooper-Climax
- Time: 2:02.89

Fastest lap
Driver	(United Kingdom) Stirling Moss	Cooper-Climax
- Time: 2:05.07

Podium
First	(United Kingdom) Stirling Moss	Cooper-Climax
Second	(United States) Masten Gregory	Cooper-Climax
Third	(United States) Dan Gurney	Ferrari

The 1959 Portuguese Grand Prix was a Formula One motor race held at Monsanto on 23 August 1959. It was race 7 of 9 in the 1959 World Championship of Drivers and race 6 of 8 in the 1959 International Cup for Formula One Manufacturers. It was the eighth Portuguese Grand Prix and the second to be included in the World Championship of Drivers. It was the third time the race was held at Monsanto and the first for Formula One. The race was held over 62 laps of the five kilometre circuit for a total race distance of 337 kilometres.

The race was won by British driver Stirling Moss, his eleventh Grand Prix victory, driving a Cooper T51 for privateer race team Rob Walker Racing Team. Moss finished a lap ahead of American racer Masten Gregory driving a similar Cooper T51 for the factory Cooper Car Company team. American Scuderia Ferrari driver Dan Gurney finished third in his Ferrari Dino 246.

== Race report ==
Wins in France and Germany had given Tony Brooks a healthy second place in the championship behind Jack Brabham. Stirling Moss improved on his poor championship position with a dominating drive, lapping the entire field. Phil Hill and Graham Hill crashed into each other on lap 6, whilst Brabham had an enormous somersaulting crash from which he emerged unscathed. Gurney was the only Ferrari in the top eight with Maurice Trintignant and Harry Schell rounding off the top five.

With Brabham failing to finish and Brooks finishing a distant five laps down in ninth, Moss closed the gap to just 9½ points behind Brabham and 5½ points behind Brooks in the championship race.

== Classification ==
=== Qualifying ===
Pos	No	Driver	Constructor	Time	Gap
1	4	(United Kingdom) Stirling Moss	Cooper-Climax	2:02.9	
2	1	(Australia) Jack Brabham	Cooper-Climax	2:04.9	+2.0
3	2	(United States) Masten Gregory	Cooper-Climax	2:06.3	+3.4
4	5	(France) Maurice Trintignant	Cooper-Climax	2:07.4	+4.5
5	7	(Sweden) Jo Bonnier	BRM	2:07.9	+5.0
6	16	(United States) Dan Gurney	Ferrari	2:08.0	+5.1
7	15	(United States) Phil Hill	Ferrari	2:08.1	+5.2
8	3	(New Zealand) Bruce McLaren	Cooper-Climax	2:08.2	+5.3
9	6	(United States) Harry Schell	BRM	2:09.1	+6.2
10	14	(United Kingdom) Tony Brooks	Ferrari	2:11.0	+8.1
11	8	(United Kingdom) Ron Flockhart	BRM	2:11.2	+8.3
12	10	(United Kingdom) Roy Salvadori	Aston Martin	2:13.3	+10.4
13	9	(United States) Carroll Shelby	Aston Martin	2:13.6	+10.7
14	18	(Portugal) Mário de Araújo Cabral	Cooper-Maserati	2:15.3	+12.4
15	11	(United Kingdom) Graham Hill	Lotus-Climax	2:15.6	+12.7
16	12	(United Kingdom) Innes Ireland	Lotus-Climax	2:18.5	+15.6

=== Race ===
Pos	No	Driver	Constructor	Laps	Time/Retired	Grid	Points
1	4	(United Kingdom) Stirling Moss	Cooper-Climax	62	2:11:55.41	1	9^{1}
2	2	(United States) Masten Gregory	Cooper-Climax	61	+ 1 Lap	3	6
3	16	(United States) Dan Gurney	Ferrari	61	+ 1 Lap	6	4
4	5	(France) Maurice Trintignant	Cooper-Climax	60	+ 2 Laps	4	3
5	6	(United States) Harry Schell	BRM	59	+ 3 Laps	9	2
6	10	(United Kingdom) Roy Salvadori	Aston Martin	59	+ 3 Laps	12	
7	8	(United Kingdom) Ron Flockhart	BRM	59	+ 3 Laps	11	
8	9	(United States) Carroll Shelby	Aston Martin	58	+ 4 Laps	13	
9	14	(United Kingdom) Tony Brooks	Ferrari	57	+ 5 Laps	10	
10	18	(Portugal) Mário de Araújo Cabral	Cooper-Maserati	56	+ 6 Laps	14	
Ret	3	(New Zealand) Bruce McLaren	Cooper-Climax	38	Transmission	8	
Ret	1	(Australia) Jack Brabham	Cooper-Climax	23	Collision	2	
Ret	7	(Sweden) Jo Bonnier	BRM	10	Engine	5	
Ret	15	(United States) Phil Hill	Ferrari	5	Accident	7	
Ret	11	(United Kingdom) Graham Hill	Lotus-Climax	5	Accident	15	
Ret	12	(United Kingdom) Innes Ireland	Lotus-Climax	3	Gearbox	16	

Notes

- ^1 – Includes 1 point for fastest lap

== Championship standings after the race ==
Drivers' Championship standings

	Pos	Driver	Points
	1	(Australia) Jack Brabham	27
	2	(United Kingdom) Tony Brooks	23
3	3	(United Kingdom) Stirling Moss	17.5
1	4	(United States) Phil Hill	13
	5	(France) Maurice Trintignant	12

Constructors' Championship standings

Pos	Constructor	Points
1	(United Kingdom) Cooper-Climax	34 (37)
2	(Italy) Ferrari	28
3	(United Kingdom) BRM	18
4	(United Kingdom) Lotus-Climax	3

- Notes: Only the top five positions are included for both sets of standings. Only the best 5 results counted towards each Championship. Numbers without parentheses are Championship points; numbers in parentheses are total points scored.

Previous race: 1959 German Grand Prix	FIA Formula One World Championship; 1959 season	Next race: 1959 Italian Grand Prix
Previous race: 1958 Portuguese Grand Prix	Portuguese Grand Prix	Next race: 1960 Portuguese Grand Prix
