= 1955 Indianapolis 500 =

American motor race

39th Indianapolis 500
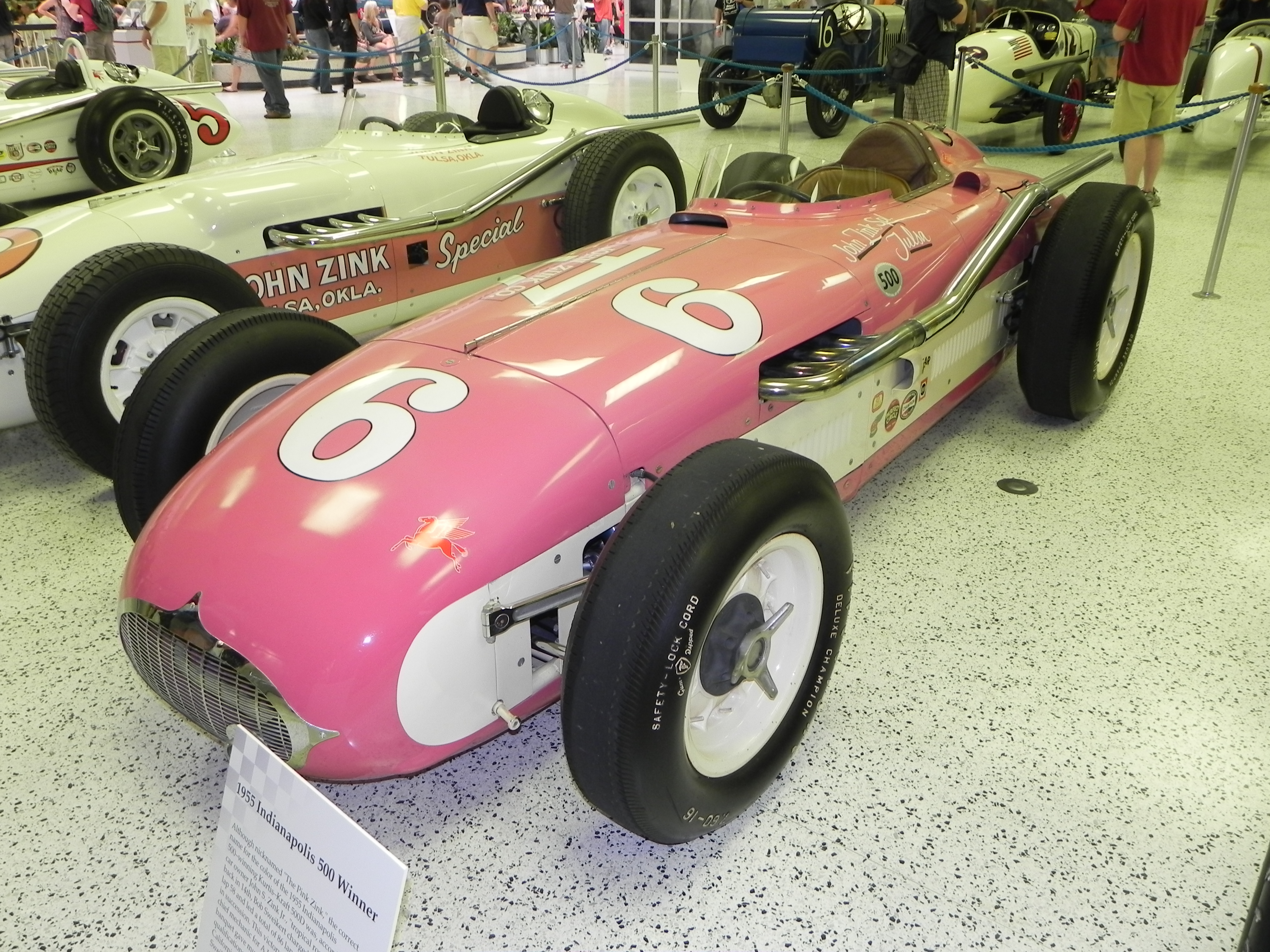

Indianapolis Motor Speedway

Indianapolis 500
- Sanctioning body: AAA
- Date: May 30, 1955
- Winner: Bob Sweikert
- Winning Entrant: John Zink
- Winning Chief Mechanic: A. J. Watson
- Winning time: 3:53:59.53
- Average speed: 128.209 mph (206.332 km/h)
- Pole position: Jerry Hoyt
- Pole speed: 140.045 mph (225.381 km/h)
- Most laps led: Bob Sweikert (86)

Pre-race
- Pace car: Chevrolet Bel Air
- Pace car driver: Thomas H. Keating
- Starter: Bill Vanderwater
- Honorary referee: Robert A. Stranahan, Jr.
- Estimated attendance: 150,000

Chronology
Previous	Next
1954	1956

The 39th International 500-Mile Sweepstakes was held at the Indianapolis Motor Speedway on Monday, May 30, 1955. The event was race 1 of 11 of the 1955 AAA National Championship Trail and was race 3 of 7 in the 1955 World Championship of Drivers.

The race is notable to many as the race in which Bill Vukovich was killed in a crash while seemingly on his way to an unprecedented third consecutive Indy 500 win. Bob Sweikert ended up winning the race on the heels of a historic year, which saw him with the 1955 National Championship and the 1955 Midwest Sprint car championship – the only driver in history to sweep all three during a single racing season.

== Time trials ==
Time trials was scheduled for four days.

=== Saturday May 14 – Pole Day time trials ===
Gusty winds, as well as the threat of rain, was observed on pole day, therefore nearly all of the competitors stayed off the track. Around the garage area, the drivers and teams agreed amongst themselves to sit out time trials for the afternoon, and instead qualify together in better conditions on Sunday. However, in the final 20 minutes, Jerry Hoyt, who had not been informed about the agreement, suddenly put his car in line, and pulled away for an unexpected qualifying attempt. His speed of 140.045 mph was not spectacular, but as the fastest (and only) car thus far of the day, he sat on the pole position. Without hesitation, Tony Bettenhausen Sr. took to the track moments later. After two fast laps, he was slowed by a gust of wind, and qualified second. Sam Hanks and Pat O'Connor got their cars ready, but neither were able to complete attempts. The day closed with only two cars in the field, and Hoyt the surprising pole winner – to the dismay of several in the garage area.

=== Sunday May 15 – Second day time trials ===
Qualifying resumed in better conditions, and most of the drivers who stayed off the track Saturday took to the track on Sunday. Jack McGrath (142.580 mph) was the fastest qualifier, and lined up third. Hoyt's pole-winning speed from the day before ended up being only the 8th-fastest overall in the field – a record slowest ranked pole speed.

Near the end of the day, Manny Ayulo crashed due to a possible steering fault and died the following day.

=== Saturday May 21 – Third day time trials ===
Paul Russo, attempting to qualify the #18 Novi for Troy Ruttman, suffers a broken gearbox. This was the last appearance of a front-drive car at Indy.

== Starting grid ==
R = Indianapolis 500 rookie; W = Former Indianapolis 500 winner

Row	Inside		Middle		Outside	
1	23	(United States) Jerry Hoyt	10	(United States) Tony Bettenhausen	3	(United States) Jack McGrath
2	14	(United States) Fred Agabashian	4	(United States) Bill Vukovich W	8	(United States) Sam Hanks
3	77	(United States) Walt Faulkner	19	(United States) Andy Linden	22	(United States) Cal Niday
4	15	(United States) Jimmy Davies	1	(United States) Jimmy Bryan	89	(United States) Pat Flaherty
5	37	(United States) Eddie Russo R	6	(United States) Bob Sweikert	5	(United States) Jimmy Reece
6	71	(United States) Al Herman R	48	(United States) Jimmy Daywalt	98	(United States) Duane Carter
7	29	(United States) Pat O'Connor	33	(United States) Jim Rathmann	12	(United States) Don Freeland
8	42	(United States) Al Keller R	49	(United States) Ray Crawford R	99	(United States) Art Cross
9	41	(United States) Chuck Weyant R	39	(United States) Johnny Boyd R	16	(United States) Johnnie Parsons W
10	31	(United States) Keith Andrews R	68	(United States) Ed Elisian	27	(United States) Rodger Ward
11	81	(United States) Shorty Templeman R	83	(United States) Eddie Johnson	44	(United States) Johnny Thomson

=== Alternates ===
- First alternate: Len Duncan (#24, #73)

=== Failed to qualify ===
- Manny Ayulo (#88) - Fatal accident
- Tony Bonadies R (#36)
- Bob Christie R (#7)
- Elmer George R (#74)
- Gene Hartley (#28)
- Bill Homeier (#72, #77)
- Johnny Kay R (#76)
- Danny Kladis (#93)
- Russ Klar R (#61)
- Ernie McCoy (#69)
- Earl Motter R (#81)
- Duke Nalon (#31)
- Roy Newman R (#93)
- Jiggs Peters R (#32)
- Paul Russo (#10, #21)
- Troy Ruttman (#18)
- George Tichenor R (#78)
- Johnnie Tolan R - Withdrew, ill
- Leroy Warriner R (#64)
- Spider Webb (#9)

== Race recap ==
=== Start ===
Jack McGrath, starting from the outside despite the fastest qualifying time, grabbed the initial lead, but was quickly challenged by Bill Vukovich, who was looking for his third consecutive win. Vukovich took the lead on lap four, surrendering it back to McGrath on lap 15 but regaining it on lap 16. Fred Agabashian, who had finished in the top ten the previous two years spun on lap 39 and could not continue. McGrath chased Vukovich until lap 54, when he pulled over with mechanical problems. Despite getting out of the car and attempting to repair it himself, he was forced to drop out with a magneto issue.

=== Lap 56, Vukovich crash ===
With Vukovich having a considerable lead on lap 56, Rodger Ward, several laps down, flipped over twice, either due to a problem with the wind, oil, or breaking an axle. Although he landed on his wheels, the car was facing the wrong way. Al Keller, attempting to avoid Ward, turned to the inside, going close to or on to the grass, before turning hard to the right and coming quickly back up the track and contacting Johnny Boyd. Boyd's car careened into Vukovich, who appeared to be attempting to also go to the left of Ward. Vukovich made a last-second attempt to avoid Boyd to the right, but Boyd's car sent Vukovich hard into the outside barrier. Vukovich's front end also lifted into the air, causing the front to clear the barrier and the car to contact it with the rear, sending the car into a cartwheel, during which it hit several vehicles parked outside the track, and possibly a pole. The car burst into flames after it came to rest, and Vukovich died from injuries from the crash. Boyd's car also flipped but he and the other drivers escaped major injury. Driver Ed Elisian stopped his car on the infield and ran across the track in an attempt to help Vukovich.

=== Remainder of race ===
After 27 minutes of running under caution, Jimmy Bryan took over the lead of the race, but was forced to retire after ninety laps with a fuel pump issue, when the lead was taken over by Bob Sweikert. The only other driver to retire due to contact for the remainder of the race was Cal Niday on lap 170. Art Cross led the race from laps 133 to 156, but after surrendering the lead to Don Freeland was forced to retire due to mechanical trouble on lap 168. Freeland similarly was passed by Sweikert on lap 160, and retired on lap 178. Sweikert led the remainder of the race. Sweikert stated that the winds made racing difficult, and perhaps led to a decision of racing cautiously and taking advantage of other's difficulty.

== Aftermath ==
The two deaths in the 500 were part of a particularly deadly year for motorsports, which also included four other Indy drivers dying in other races, Alberto Ascari being killed while testing a sports car at Monza, and a horrific accident at the 24 Hours of Le Mans which saw nearly 100 fatalities including Pierre Levegh who was driving at the time of the accident. Following the year the American Automobile Association ceased sanctioning auto races (including the Indy 500) and the United States Auto Club (USAC) was formed to handle sanctioning duties. It would take until 1959 for fire suits to be made mandatory for all drivers and roll bars for all cars after Jerry Unser's fatal accident at the 1959 Indianapolis 500.

== Box score ==
Finish	Grid	No.	Driver	Constructor	Qualifying		Laps	Status	Points	
Finish	Grid	No.	Driver	Constructor	Speed	Rank	Laps	Status	USAC	WDC
1	14	6	(United States) Bob Sweikert	KK500D-Offenhauser	139.99	11	200	128.209 mph	1000	8
2	2	10	(United States) Tony Bettenhausen (Paul Russo Laps 57–133)	KK500C-Offenhauser	139.98	13	200	+2:43.56	500; 300	3; 3
3	10	15	(United States) Jimmy Davies	KK500B-Offenhauser	140.27	5	200	+3:32.36	700	4
4	33	44	(United States) Johnny Thomson	Kuzma-Offenhauser	134.11	33	200	+3:38.91	600	3
5	7	77	(United States) Walt Faulkner (Bill Homeier Laps 138–161)	KK500C-Offenhauser	139.76	16	200	+5:17.17	447½; 52½	1; 1
6	8	19	(United States) Andy Linden	KK4000-Offenhauser	139.09	22	200	+5:57.94	400	
7	16	71	(United States) Al Herman R	Silnes-Offenhauser	139.81	15	200	+6:24.24	300	
8	19	29	(United States) Pat O'Connor	KK500D-Offenhauser	139.19	21	200	+6:41.60	250	
9	17	48	(United States) Jimmy Daywalt	Kurtis-Offenhauser	139.41	18	200	+7:09.81	200	
10	12	89	(United States) Pat Flaherty	KK500B-Offenhauser	140.14	7	200	+7:46.54	150	
11	18	98	(United States) Duane Carter	Kuzma-Offenhauser	139.33	19	197	-3 Laps	100	
12	25	41	(United States) Chuck Weyant R	KK3000-Offenhauser	138.06	25	196	-4 Laps	50	
13	32	83	(United States) Eddie Johnson	Trevis-Offenhauser	134.44	32	196	-4 Laps		
14	20	33	(United States) Jim Rathmann	Epperly-Offenhauser	138.70	24	191	-9 Laps		
15	21	12	(United States) Don Freeland	Phillips-Offenhauser	139.86	14	178	Transmission		
16	9	22	(United States) Cal Niday	KK500B-Offenhauser	140.30	4	170	Accident		
17	24	99	(United States) Art Cross	KK500D-Offenhauser	138.75	23	168	Engine		
18	31	81	(United States) Shorty Templeman R	Trevis-Offenhauser	135.01	31	142	Transmission		
19	6	8	(United States) Sam Hanks	KK500C-Offenhauser	140.00	10	134	Transmission		
20	28	31	(United States) Keith Andrews R	Schroeder-Offenhauser	136.04	28	120	Fuel Pump		
21	27	16	(United States) Johnnie Parsons W	KK500D-Offenhauser	136.80	27	119	Magneto		
22	13	37	(United States) Eddie Russo R	Allen-Offenhauser	140.11	8	112	Ignition		
23	23	49	(United States) Ray Crawford R	KK500B-Offenhauser	139.20	20	111	Engine		
24	11	1	(United States) Jimmy Bryan	Kuzma-Offenhauser	140.16	6	90	Fuel Pump		
25	5	4	(United States) Bill Vukovich W ✝	KK500C-Offenhauser	141.07	3	56	Fatal Accident		1^{1}
26	3	3	(United States) Jack McGrath	KK500C-Offenhauser	142.58	1	54	Magneto		
27	22	42	(United States) Al Keller R	KK2000-Offenhauser	139.55	17	54	Accident		
28	30	27	(United States) Rodger Ward	Kuzma-Offenhauser	135.04	30	53	Accident		
29	26	39	(United States) Johnny Boyd R	KK500C-Offenhauser	136.98	26	53	Accident		
30	29	68	(United States) Ed Elisian	KK4000-Offenhauser	135.33	29	53	Retirement		
31	1	23	(United States) Jerry Hoyt	Stevens-Offenhauser	140.04	9	40	Oil Leak		
32	4	14	(United States) Fred Agabashian	KK500D-Offenhauser	141.93	2	39	Spun Off		
33	15	5	(United States) Jimmy Reece	Pankratz-Offenhauser	139.99	12	10	Engine		

Note: Relief drivers in parentheses

W Former Indianapolis 500 winner

R Indianapolis 500 Rookie

All entrants utilized Firestone tires.

^1 – 1 point for fastest lead lap

=== Race statistics ===
Lap Leaders
Laps	Leader
1–3	Jack McGrath
4–14	Bill Vukovich
15	Jack McGrath
16–24	Bill Vukovich
25–26	Jack McGrath
27–56	Bill Vukovich
57	Jimmy Bryan
58	Bob Sweikert
59–88	Jimmy Bryan
89–132	Bob Sweikert
133–156	Art Cross
157–159	Don Freeland
160–200	Bob Sweikert

Total laps led
Driver	Laps
Bob Sweikert	86
Bill Vukovich	50
Jimmy Bryan	31
Art Cross	24
Jack McGrath	6
Don Freeland	3

Yellow Lights: 30 minutes, 25 seconds
Laps*	Reason
40–41	Fred Agabashian spin on backstretch (1:40)
56–72	Ward, Elisian, Keller, Boyd, Vukovich crash on backstretch (27:10)
173	Cal Niday crash in turn 4 (1:35)
* – Approximate lap counts

== Additional stats ==
- Pole position: Jerry Hoyt – 1:04.27 (while Hoyt started on the pole, Jack McGrath set the fastest time but started on the outside of the first row)
- Fastest Lead Lap: Bill Vukovich – 1:03.67
- Shared Drives:
  - Car #10: Tony Bettenhausen (123 laps) and Paul Russo (77 laps). They shared the 6 points for second place. After Russo had failed to qualify in his own machine, Bettenhausen and Russo pre-arranged to serve as co-drivers in the #10 car on race day. Bettenhausen started the race, and per plan, handed the car over to Russo during the first pit stop. Russo then handed the car back to Bettenhausen on the second and final pit stop.
  - Car #77: Walt Faulkner (176 laps) and Bill Homeier (24 laps). They shared the 2 points for fifth place.
- While in the lead, Bill Vukovich hit the 3-car pileup of Al Keller, Johnny Boyd, and Rodger Ward. He was killed (by fracture to the skull) when his car became airborne and went out of the course on the back long straightaway, landing upside down and on fire. His death concluded a streak of three straight years leading the most laps in the race (likely to have been four straight, 1955 inclusive), a feat unequaled since.
- Formula 1 championship debut for Keith Andrews, Johnny Boyd, Ray Crawford, Al Herman, Al Keller, Eddie Russo, Shorty Templeman and Chuck Weyant

== Broadcasting ==
=== Radio ===
The race was carried live on the IMS Radio Network. Sid Collins served as chief announcer. The broadcast was carried by 237 affiliates in all 48 states, as well as Armed Forces Radio. The broadcast was dedicated to the memory of Wilbur Shaw, who was killed in a plane crash in October.

Luke Walton reported from the north pits for the third year. Charlie Brockman, in his fourth appearance on the network, conducted the winner's interview in victory lane.

All five of the major radio stations in the Indianapolis area carried the broadcast. The broadcast was notable as it reported the fatal crash of Bill Vukovich.

Indianapolis Motor Speedway Radio Network
Booth Announcers	Turn Reporters	Pit/garage reporters
Chief Announcer: Sid Collins; Analyst: Gordon Graham; Driver Expert: Mauri Rose; Statistician: Charlie Brockman	South Turns: Bill Frosch; Backstretch: Jack Shapiro; North Turns: Jim Shelton	Luke Walton (north); Greg Smith (south); Charlie Brockman (victory lane)

== World Drivers' Championship ==
1955 Indianapolis 500
Race 3 of 7 in the 1955 Formula One season
← Previous race	Next race →

Race details
- Date: May 30, 1955
- Location: Indianapolis Motor Speedway; Speedway, Indiana
- Course: Permanent racing facility
- Course length: 4.023 km (2.500 miles)
- Distance: 200 laps, 804.672 km (500.000 miles)

=== Background ===
The Indianapolis 500 was included in the FIA World Championship of Drivers from 1950 through 1960. The race was sanctioned by AAA through 1955, and then by USAC beginning in 1956. At the time the new world championship was announced and first organized by the CSI, the United States did not yet have a Grand Prix. Indianapolis Motor Speedway vice president and general manager Theodore E. "Pop" Meyers lobbied that the Indianapolis 500 be selected as the race to represent the country and to pay points towards the world championship.

Drivers competing at the Indianapolis 500 in 1950 through 1960 were credited with participation in and earned points towards the World Championship of Drivers. However, the machines competing at Indianapolis were not necessarily run to Formula One specifications and regulations. The drivers also earned separate points (on a different scale) towards the respective AAA or USAC national championships. No points, however, were awarded by the FIA towards the World Constructors' Championship.

=== Summary ===
The 1955 Indianapolis 500 was round 3 of 7 on the 1955 World Championship. The event, however, failed to attract interest from any of the regular competitors on the Grand Prix circuit. Race winner Bob Sweikert earned 8 points towards the World Championship. Despite not competing in any of the other World Championship events, he finished seventh in the final season standings.

==== World Drivers' Championship standings after the race ====
	Pos	Driver	Points
	1	(France) Maurice Trintignant	11 1/3
	2	(Argentina) Juan Manuel Fangio	10
31	3	(United States) Bob Sweikert	8
1	4	(Italy) Giuseppe Farina	6 1/3
1	5	(Italy) Eugenio Castellotti	6

- Note: Only the top five positions are included.

== See also ==
- 1955 AAA Championship Car season

Previous race: 1955 Monaco Grand Prix	FIA Formula One World Championship; 1955 season	Next race: 1955 Belgian Grand Prix
Previous race: 1954 Indianapolis 500; Bill Vukovich	1955 Indianapolis 500; Bob Sweikert	Next race: 1956 Indianapolis 500; Pat Flaherty
