= Bill Homeier =

American racing driver (1918–2001)

- Born: August 31, 1918
- Died: May 5, 2001 (aged 82)

Formula One World Championship career
- Nationality: (United States) American
- Active years: 1953–1955, 1958–1960
- Team(s): Nichels, Kurtis Kraft, Kuzma, Kupiec, Lesovsky
- Entries: 6 (3 starts)
- Championships: 0
- Wins: 0
- Podiums: 0
- Career points: 1
- Pole positions: 0
- Fastest laps: 0
- First entry: 1953 Indianapolis 500
- Last entry: 1960 Indianapolis 500

Bill Homeier (August 31, 1918 Rock Island, Texas – May 5, 2001 Houston, Texas) was an American racecar driver.

Homeier drove in the AAA and USAC Championship Car series, racing in the 1953–1955 and 1958–1960 seasons with 14 starts, including the 1954 and 1960 Indianapolis 500 races. He was a relief driver for Walt Faulkner in the 1955 Indianapolis 500. He finished in the top-ten five times, with his best finish in fifth position, in 1959 at Sacramento. He holds a unique record from the 1954 Indianapolis 500; he finished in last place, but completed 74 laps, the most for a last place finisher.

== Indianapolis 500 results ==
Year	Car	Start	Qual	Rank	Finish	Laps	Led	Retired
1954	51	18	138.948	11	33	74	0	Crash Pits
1955	77	-	-	-	5	?	?	Running*
1960	39	31	141.248	32	13	200	0	Running
Totals						274	0	

* shared drive with Walt Faulkner

Starts	2
Poles	0
Front Row	0
Wins	0
Top 5	0
Top 10	0
Retired	1

== World Championship career summary ==
The Indianapolis 500 was part of the FIA World Championship from 1950 through 1960. Drivers competing at Indy during those years were credited with World Championship points and participation. Homeier participated in three World Championship races, scoring one World Championship point.
