= 1956 USAC Stock Car Series =

1st season of the USAC Stock Car Series

Seasons
- ← none 1957 →

The 1956 USAC Stock Car Series was the first season of the stock car series sanctioned by USAC. The series was previously sanctioned by AAA between 1950 and 1955. It was the only season to feature the Pacific Coast Division and Short Track Division. Johnny Mantz won the national title, Sam Hanks won the Pacific Coast Division title, and Troy Ruttman won the Short Track Division title.

== Schedule and results ==
=== National Division ===
The 1956 season included nineteen individual races, although the Milwaukee Mile hosted four races, Broadway Speedway and Illiana Motor Speedway hosted three races each, and Clovis Speedway and Santa Fe Speedway hosted two races each. The races at Clovis, the race at West Coast Speedway, and the race at Paramount Ranch were in combination with the Pacific Coast Division.

Date	Name	Racetrack	Location	Winner
March 4	no name	Clovis Speedway	Clovis, California	Marshall Teague
April 22	no name	West Coast Speedway	Vallejo, California	Troy Ruttman
May 5	no name	Broadway Speedway	Knoxville, Tennessee	Nelson Stacy
June 16	no name	Broadway Speedway	Knoxville, Tennessee	Marshall Teague
June 23	no name	Toledo Raceway Park	Toledo, Ohio	Bud Moneymaker
June 27	no name	Illiana Motor Speedway	Schererville, Indiana	Les Snow
July 7	no name	Clovis Speedway	Clovis, California	George Seeger
July 15	no name	Milwaukee Mile	West Allis, Wisconsin	Troy Ruttman
July 18	no name	Illiana Motor Speedway	Schererville, Indiana	Jim Rathmann
July 28	no name	Santa Fe Speedway	Willow Springs, Illinois	Pat Flaherty
August 4	no name	Broadway Speedway	Knoxville, Tennessee	Les Snow
August 19	no name	Milwaukee Mile	West Allis, Wisconsin	Johnny Mantz
August 23	no name	Milwaukee Mile	West Allis, Wisconsin	Sam Hanks
August 15	no name	Santa Fe Speedway	Willow Springs, Illinois	Les Snow
August 29	no name	Illiana Motor Speedway	Schererville, Indiana	Troy Ruttman
September 1	no name	DuQuoin State Fairgrounds	Du Quoin, Illinois	Marshall Teague
September 16	no name	Milwaukee Mile	West Allis, Wisconsin	Jimmy Bryan
October 28	Dixie 200	Birmingham International Raceway	Birmingham, Alabama	Johnny Mantz
November 4	no name	Paramount Ranch	Agoura, California	Sam Hanks

=== Pacific Coast Division ===
The 1956 season included nine individual races, although Saugus Speedway hosted three races and Clovis Speedway hosted two races. The races at Clovis and the race at West Coast Speedway were in combination with the national division. The races at Saugus and the races at Gardena Stadium and Orange Show Speedway were in combination with the Short Track Division.

Date	Name	Racetrack	Location	Winner
February 19	no name	Saugus Speedway	Saugus, California	Chuck Stevenson
March 4	no name	Clovis Speedway	Clovis, California	Marshall Teague
April 22	no name	West Coast Speedway	Vallejo, California	Troy Ruttman
April 28	no name	Gardena Stadium	Gardena, California	Troy Ruttman
June 30	no name	Saugus Speedway	Saugus, California	Troy Ruttman
July 7	no name	Clovis Speedway	Clovis, California	George Seeger
August 3	no name	Orange Show Speedway	San Bernardino, California	Troy Ruttman
August 12	no name	Saugus Speedway	Saugus, California	Pat Flaherty
November 4	no name	Paramount Ranch	Agoura, California	Sam Hanks

=== Short Track Division ===
The 1956 season included six individual races, although Saugus Speedway hosted three races. All races besides the race at 16th Street Speedway were in combination with the Pacific Coast Division.

Date	Name	Racetrack	Location	Winner
February 19	no name	Saugus Speedway	Saugus, California	Chuck Stevenson
April 28	no name	Gardena Stadium	Gardena, California	Troy Ruttman
May 27	no name	16th Street Speedway	Indianapolis, Indiana	Jack Farris
June 30	no name	Saugus Speedway	Saugus, California	Troy Ruttman
August 3	no name	Orange Show Speedway	San Bernardino, California	Troy Ruttman
August 12	no name	Saugus Speedway	Saugus, California	Pat Flaherty

== See also ==
- 1956 USAC Championship Car season
