= Pat O'Connor (racing driver) =

American racing driver (1928–1958)

- O'Connor on the cover of the Sports Illustrated issue cover dated May 26, 1958
- Born: Patrick James O'Connor; October 9, 1928 North Vernon, Indiana, U.S.
- Died: May 30, 1958 (aged 29) Speedway, Indiana, U.S.

Champ Car career
- 36 races run over 7 years
- Years active: 1952–1958
- Best finish: 4th – 1957
- First race: 1953 Hoosier Hundred (Indiana State Fairgrounds)
- Last race: 1958 Indianapolis 500 (Indianapolis Motor Speedway)
- First win: 1956 Pee Dee 200 (Darlington)
- Last win: 1957 Trenton 100 (Trenton)
Wins	Podiums	Poles
2	6	1

Formula One World Championship career
- Active years: 1953–1958
- Team(s): Diedt, Kurtis Kraft, Schroeder
- Entries: 6 (5 starts)
- Championships: 0
- Wins: 0
- Podiums: 0
- Career points: 0
- Pole positions: 1
- Fastest laps: 0
- First entry: 1953 Indianapolis 500
- Last entry: 1958 Indianapolis 500

Patrick James O'Connor (October 9, 1928 – May 30, 1958) was an American racecar driver. He was killed in a 15-car pileup, after sustaining a fatal head injury after rolling his car and catching fire on the first lap of the 1958 Indianapolis 500.

== Champ Car ==
O'Connor competed in 36 races in his champ car career. He took his first win in 1956 at Darlington Raceway. In 1957, he won the pole position for the Indianapolis 500 and he finished eighth. Later in the year, he won at Trenton Speedway.

O'Connor was on the cover of Sports Illustrated in May 1958 (one week before the race), adding to the legend of the Sports Illustrated Cover Jinx.

== Death ==
For the 1958 Indianapolis 500, Dick Rathmann and Ed Elisian started the race on the front row, with Jimmy Reece on the outside of the front row. Elisian spun in turn 3 of the first lap and collided with Rathmann's car, sending them both into the wall, and starting a 15-car pileup.

According to A. J. Foyt, O'Connor's car hit Reece's car, sailed fifty feet in the air, landed upside down, and burst into flames. Although O'Connor was incinerated in the accident, medical officials said that he was probably killed instantly from a fractured skull. In an interview after the race, winner Jimmy Bryan was quoted for saying "It was a nightmare. I lived with it for 200 laps."

Widely blamed for the accident, Elisian was suspended by USAC for the accident (reinstated a few days later), and was shunned by many in the racing community.

Following the accident, race officials announced that they would change the starting procedure, abandoning the single-file trip down pit lane that was used in 1957 and 1958. Also, for the 1959 Indy 500, metal roll bars welded to the frame behind the driver's head were mandated, and helmets were required to pass safety certification by Speedway medical officials.

== Awards ==
O'Connor was inducted in the National Sprint Car Hall of Fame in 1995.

== Legacy ==
Salem Speedway honored him along with Joe James with an annual title event. The 2020 event was part of the USAC Silvercrown series.

== Complete AAA/USAC Championship Car results ==
Year	1	2	3	4	5	6	7	8	9	10	11	12	13	Pos	Points
1952	INDY	MIL	RAL	SPR	MIL	DET	DUQ; DNQ	PIK	SYR	DNC	SJS	PHX		-	0
1953	INDY; DNQ	MIL; DNQ	SPR	DET	SPR	MIL	DUQ; DNQ	PIK	SYR	ISF; 7	SAC	PHX; 8		32nd	110
1954	INDY; 21	MIL; 5	LAN; DNQ	DAR; 10	SPR; DNQ	MIL; 19	DUQ; DNQ	PIK	SYR; DNQ	ISF; DNQ	SAC; DNQ	PHX; DNQ	LVG; 9	25th	200
1955	INDY; 8	MIL; 18	LAN; 5	SPR; DNQ	MIL; 26	DUQ; 9	PIK	SYR; 4	ISF; 5	SAC; 5	PHX; 5			7th	800
1956	INDY; 18	MIL; 11	LAN; DNQ	DAR; 1	ATL; 17	SPR; 5	MIL; 21	DUQ; DNQ	SYR; 13	ISF; 2	SAC; 15	PHX; DNQ		11th	680
1957	INDY; 8	LAN; DNQ	MIL; 4	DET	ATL	SPR; DNQ	MIL; 3	DUQ; 8	SYR; 2	ISF; 10	TRE; 1	SAC; 15	PHX; 2	4th	1,250
1958	TRE; 13	INDY; 29	MIL	LAN	ATL	SPR	MIL	DUQ	SYR	ISF	TRE	SAC	PHX	-	0

== Indianapolis 500 results ==
Year	Car	Start	Qual	Rank	Finish	Laps	Led	Retired
1953	28							Failed to Qualify
1953	64							Failed to Qualify
1953	74							Failed to Qualify
1954	35	12	138.084	24	21	181	0	Spun T2
1955	29	19	139.195	21	8	200	0	Running
1956	7	3	144.980	4	18	187	39	Flagged
1957	12	1	143.948	2	8	200	7	Running
1958	4	5	144.823	5	29	0	0	Crash T3 (fatal)
Totals						768	46	

Starts	5
Poles	1
Front Row	2
Wins	0
Top 5	0
Top 10	2
Retired	2

== Complete Formula One World Championship results ==
(key)

Year	Entrant	Chassis	Engine	1	2	3	4	5	6	7	8	9	10	11	WDC	Points
1953	Slick Racers	Diedt	Offenhauser L4	ARG	500; DNQ	NED	BEL	FRA	GBR	GER	SUI	ITA			NC	0
1953	Engle-Stanko	Kurtis Kraft 4000	Offenhauser L4		500; DNQ										NC	0
1953	Brown Motors	Schroeder	Offenhauser L4		500; DNQ										NC	0
1954	Hopkins / Motor Racers	Kurtis Kraft 500C	Offenhauser L4	ARG	500; 21	BEL	FRA	GBR	GER	SUI	ITA	ESP			NC	0
1955	Ansted Rotary	Kurtis Kraft 500D	Offenhauser L4	ARG	MON	500; 8	BEL	NED	GBR	ITA					NC	0
1956	Ansted Rotary	Kurtis Kraft 500D	Offenhauser L4	ARG	MON	500; 18	BEL	FRA	GBR	GER	ITA				NC	0
1957	Ansted Rotary	Kurtis Kraft 500G	Offenhauser L4	ARG	MON	500; 30	FRA	GBR	GER	PES	ITA				NC	0
1958	Sumar / Chapman Root	Kurtis Kraft 500G	Offenhauser L4	ARG	MON	NED	500; 29	BEL	FRA	GBR	GER	POR	ITA	MOR	NC	0

== World Championship career summary ==
The Indianapolis 500 was part of the FIA World Championship from 1950 through 1960. Drivers competing at Indy during those years were credited with World Championship points and participation. O'Connor participated in five World Championship races. He started on the pole once but scored no World Championship points, as his best finish was eighth (twice).

== See also ==
- List of fatalities at Indianapolis

Preceded by Keith Andrews	Formula One fatal accidents July 6, 1958	Succeeded by Luigi Musso
