= Kuzma-Offenhauser =

Kuzma-Offenhauser (Dean Van Lines Special)
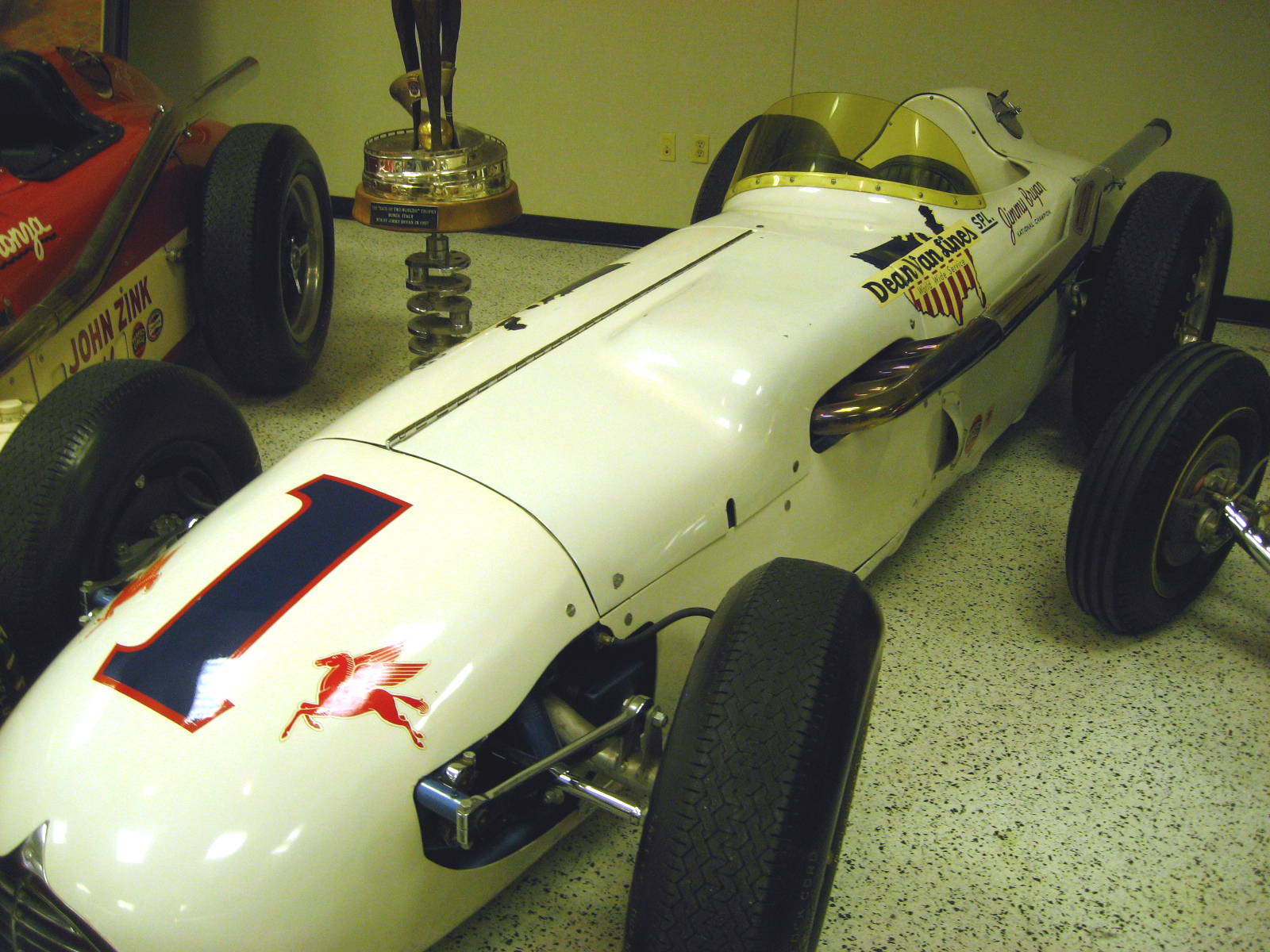
- Category: U.S.A.C. IndyCar

Technical specifications
- Suspension: Independent suspension, tubular shock absorbers, coil springs
- Engine: Offenhauser 252–274 cu in (4.1–4.5 L) 16-valve, DOHC I4, naturally-aspirated, FR
- Transmission: 2-speed manual
- Power: 412 hp (307 kW) @ 6000 rpm
- Weight: 1,550 lb (703.1 kg)

Competition history

The Kuzma-Offenhauser, nicknamed the Dean Van Lines Special, was an open-wheel race car chassis designed and developed by automotive mechanic and engineer Eddie Kuzma for U.S.A.C. Indy car racing, between 1953 and 1965.
