= Clyde Palmer =

American racing driver (1923–2005)

- Born: Clyde Wayne Palmer; November 13, 1923; Nebraska, U.S.
- Died: November 5, 2005 (aged 81); Lakeport, California, U.S.

NASCAR Cup Series career
- 22 races run over 5 years
- Best finish: 34th (1956)
- First race: 1954 Race 6 (Oakland)
- Last race: 1961 Race 45 (Sacramento)
| Wins | Top tens | Poles |
|---|---|---|
| 0 | 10 | 0 |

ARCA Menards Series West career
- 43 races run over 8 years
- Best finish: 4th (1956)
- First race: 1954 Race 1 (Oakland)
- Last race: 1964 Race 3 (San Jose)
- First win: 1956 Race 4 (Gardena)
- Last win: 1957 Race 15 (Merced)
| Wins | Top tens | Poles |
|---|---|---|
| 2 | 24 | 5 |
- Statistics up to date as of October 26, 2026.

Clyde Wayne Palmer (November 13, 1923 – November 5, 2005) was an American professional stock car racing driver. He competed in the NASCAR Grand National Series and NASCAR Pacific Coast Late Model Division between 1954 and 1964.

== Racing career ==
Palmer was a seven-time racing champion who competed at such tracks as San Jose Speedway, Darlington Raceway, Kearney Bowl, Clovis Speedway, and Stockton 99 Speedway.

Palmer simultaneously made his NASCAR Grand National Series and NASCAR Pacific Coast Late Model Division debut in the inaugural race of the Pacific Coast Late Model Division at Oakland Stadiumin 1954, finishing fourth; he made another start at Oakland and a standalone Pacific Coast Late Model start at Vallejo Speedway, finishing top-ten in both.

Palmer made at least five Pacific Coast Late Model starts in 1955, scoring a best finish of third in the season-opener at the Arizona State Fairgrounds. The race at the Arizona State Fairgrounds and the race at Las Vegas Park Speedway, where he finished 23rd due to a crash, were combination races with the Grand National Series.

Palmer ran at least 18 of 32 Pacific Coast Late Model races in 1956, scoring his first career win at Gardena Stadium, three poles, and thirteen top-tens. He finished fourth in the standings. He also ran 11 Grand National races, nine of which were combination races; he competed in standalone events at Willow Springs Speedway (held in November 1955) and Darlington Raceway, where he finished 48th of 70 cars in the 1956 Southern 500 due to overheating issues. Palmer also made his lone career USAC Stock Car Series start in 1956, finishing 16th at West Coast Speedway; the race was a combination race with the Pacific Coast Division.

Palmer ran thirteen Pacific Coast Late Model races in 1957, scoring his second and final win in the series at Merced Fairgrounds and scoring six top-tens, all top-fives. He ran a standalone Grand National race at Willow Springs (held in November 1956) and five combination races with a best finish of third at Portland Speedway.

Palmer only attempted two races in 1958, finishing fifteenth at Gardena Stadium and failing to qualify for the combination race at Riverside International Raceway. After not competing in 1960, he returned for a combination race at the California State Fairgrounds Race Track, finishing 29th due to a fuel pump issue.

Palmer competed in a Pacific Coast Late Model race at the California State Fairgrounds in 1963, finishing fourth. He made his final start in the series in 1964, finishing fifth at San Jose Speedway.

Nineteen of his career Pacific Coast Late Model races were combination races with the NASCAR Short Track Division, including both of his wins.

Between 1955 and 1961, Palmer ran at least 18 NASCAR Late Model Sportsman National Championship races, scoring seven recorded wins. From 1961 to 1968, Palmer ran over 200 races in the NASCAR Modified National Championship with 34 recorded wins. He finished sixth in the standings in 1962.

== Personal life ==
Palmer was a native of Nebraska. He was married to Bernice Palmer for 51 years until his death in 2005; they had a son, Scott.

== Death ==
Palmer died on November 5, 2005, at his home in Lakeport, California.
