= Billy Garrett =

American racing driver (1933–1999)

- Born: William Joseph Garrett; April 24, 1933 Princeton, Illinois, U.S.
- Died: February 15, 1999 (aged 65) Glendale, California, U.S.

Champ Car career
- 16 races run over 3 years
- Years active: 1956–1958
- Best finish: 17th – 1957
- First race: 1956 Indianapolis 500 (Indianapolis)
- Last race: 1958 Rex Mays Classic (Milwaukee)
Wins	Podiums	Poles
0	0	1

Formula One World Championship career
- Active years: 1956–1958
- Team(s): Kurtis Kraft, Kuzma
- Entries: 3 (2 starts)
- Championships: 0
- Wins: 0
- Podiums: 0
- Career points: 0
- Pole positions: 0
- Fastest laps: 0
- First entry: 1956 Indianapolis 500
- Last entry: 1958 Indianapolis 500

William Joseph Garrett (April 24, 1933 in Princeton, Illinois – February 15, 1999 in Glendale, California) was an American racecar driver.

A second generation driver (his father, John, competed in roadsters and sprint cars in California), Garrett began his career racing roadsters and midgets in Southern California, and was the 1955 & 1956 URA midget champion. He made 18 starts in USAC Championship races from 1956 through 1958, winning the pole position at Langhorne Speedway in 1956. He suffered career ending injuries in a crash during the 1958 Rex Mays 100 at the Wisconsin State Fair Speedway. Garrett was inducted into the National Midget Auto Racing Hall of Fame.

== Indy 500 results ==
Year	Car	Start	Qual	Rank	Finish	Laps	Led	Retired
1956	41	29	140.559	30	16	194	0	Flagged
1958	43	15	142.778	22	21	80	0	Cam gear
Totals						274	0	

Starts	2
Poles	0
Front Row	0
Wins	0
Top 5	0
Top 10	0
Retired	1

== World Championship career summary ==
The Indianapolis 500 was part of the FIA World Championship from 1950 through 1960. Drivers competing at Indy during those years were credited with World Championship points and participation. Billy Garrett participated in 2 World Championship races. He started on the pole 0 times, won 0 races, set 0 fastest laps, and finished on the podium 0 times. He accumulated a total of 0 championship points.
