= Eddie Kuzma =

American auto racing builder

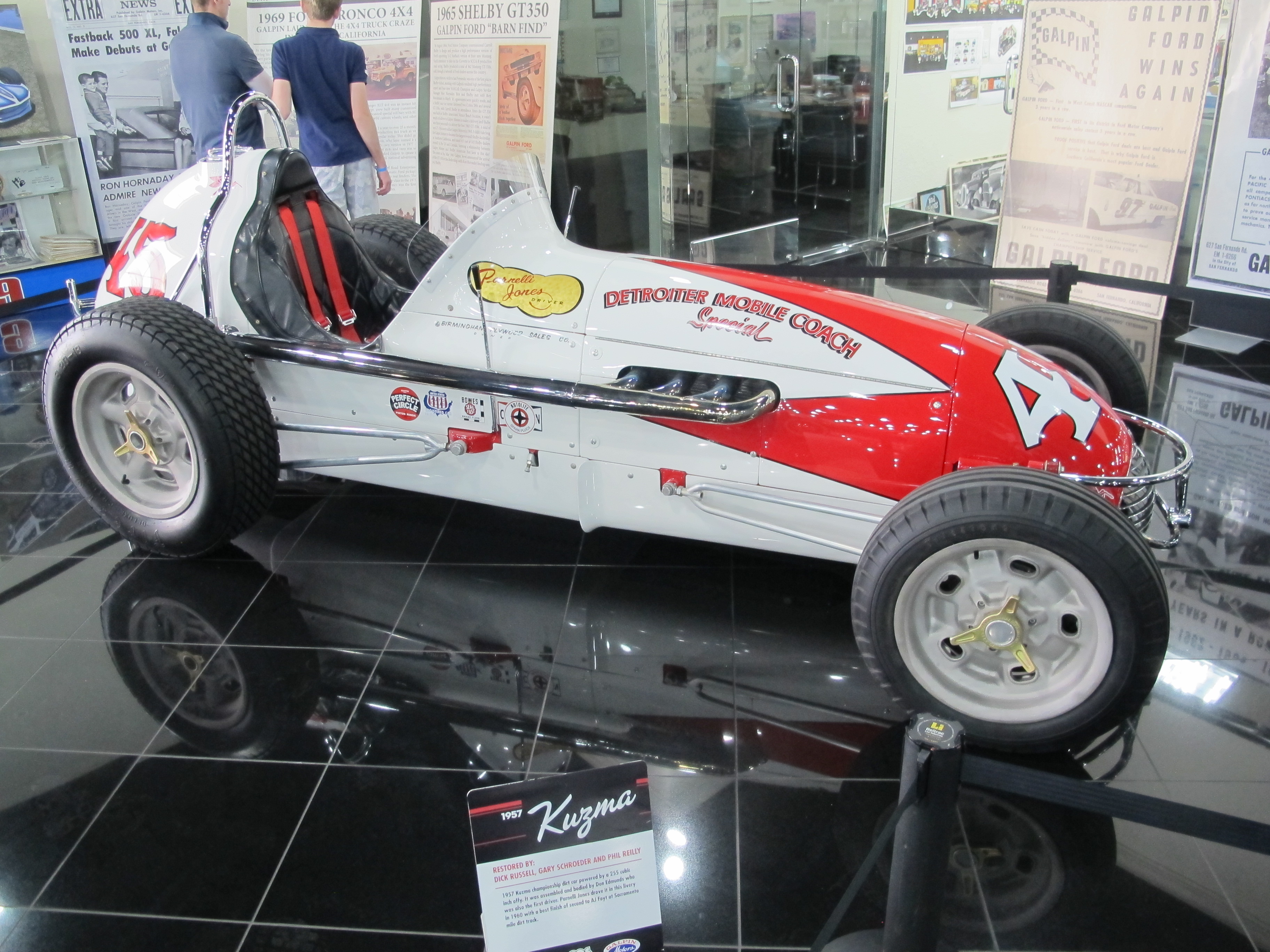
- 1957 Kuzma-constructed Indy car
- Born: Edward Leo Kuzma; September 18, 1911; Portland, Oregon, U.S.
- Died: October 12, 1996 (aged 85); Tigard, Oregon, U.S.
- Occupation: Auto racing builder

Edward Leo Kuzma (September 18, 1911 – October 12, 1996) was an American race car builder. He constructed Troy Ruttman's winning car for the 1952 Indianapolis 500.

== Biography ==
Kuzma was born in Portland, Oregon, where he was raised on a farm. He moved to Vancouver, Washington, where he established an automobile repair shop. In the 1930s, Kuzma had seen midget race cars at the Jantzen Beach Amusement Park, and had built and raced his own car. A second car was fitted with a four-cylinder Offenhauser engine, making it faster than other local competitors. He served in the United States Navy during World War II. After he was discharged from the service, sold his car and moved to Los Angeles, California.

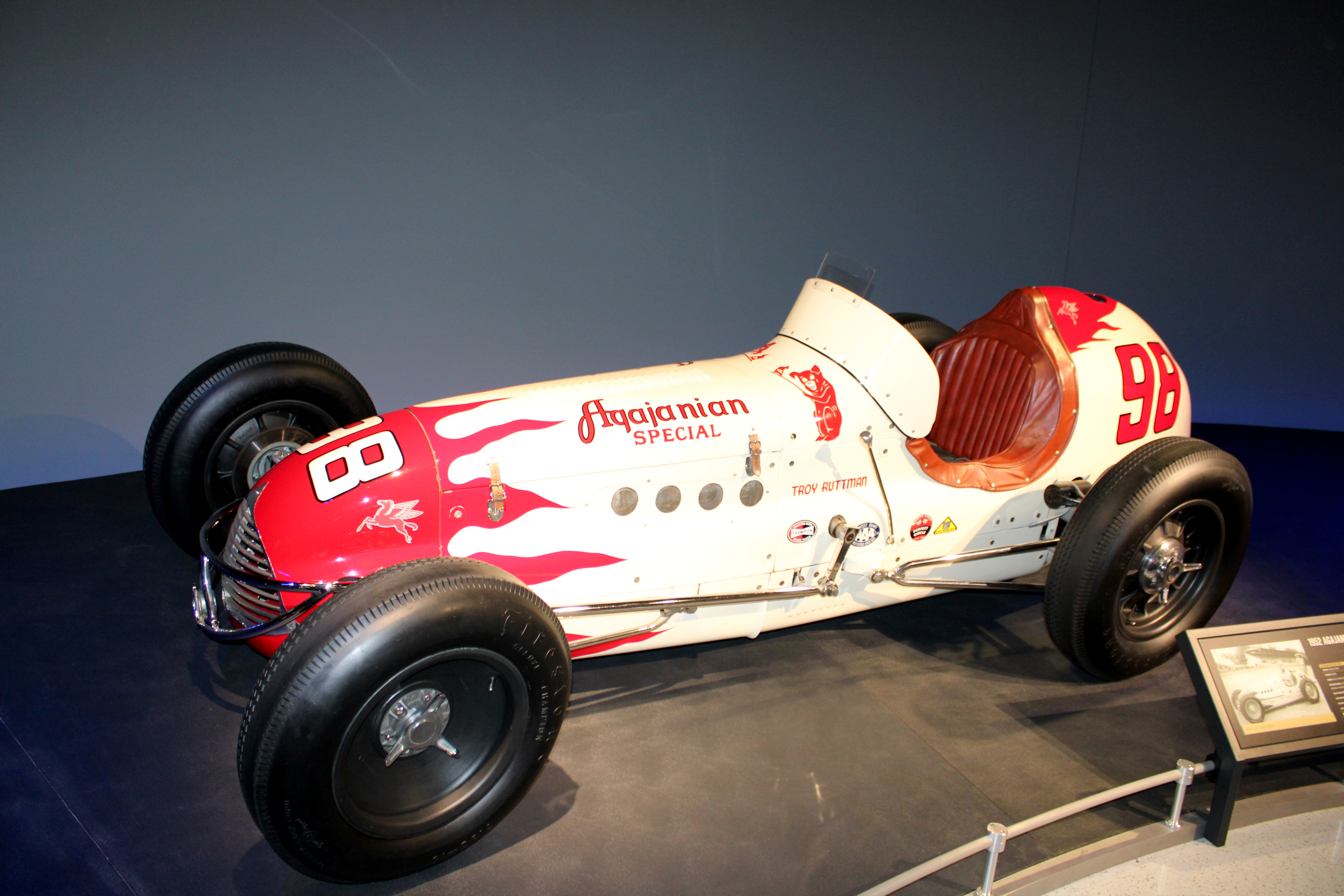
Ruttman's winning Kuzma from the 1952 Indianapolis 500

In California, Kuzma continued to build midget race cars. He was hired by J. C. Agajanian to build the Agajanian Special, which won the 1952 Indianapolis 500, driven by Troy Ruttman. A. J. Foyt won the Indianapolis 500 twice driving Kuzma's cars, and Mario Andretti won in one of his cars in 1969. Kuzma also rebuilt race cars. In 1968, he bought a farm along with his wife Edna.

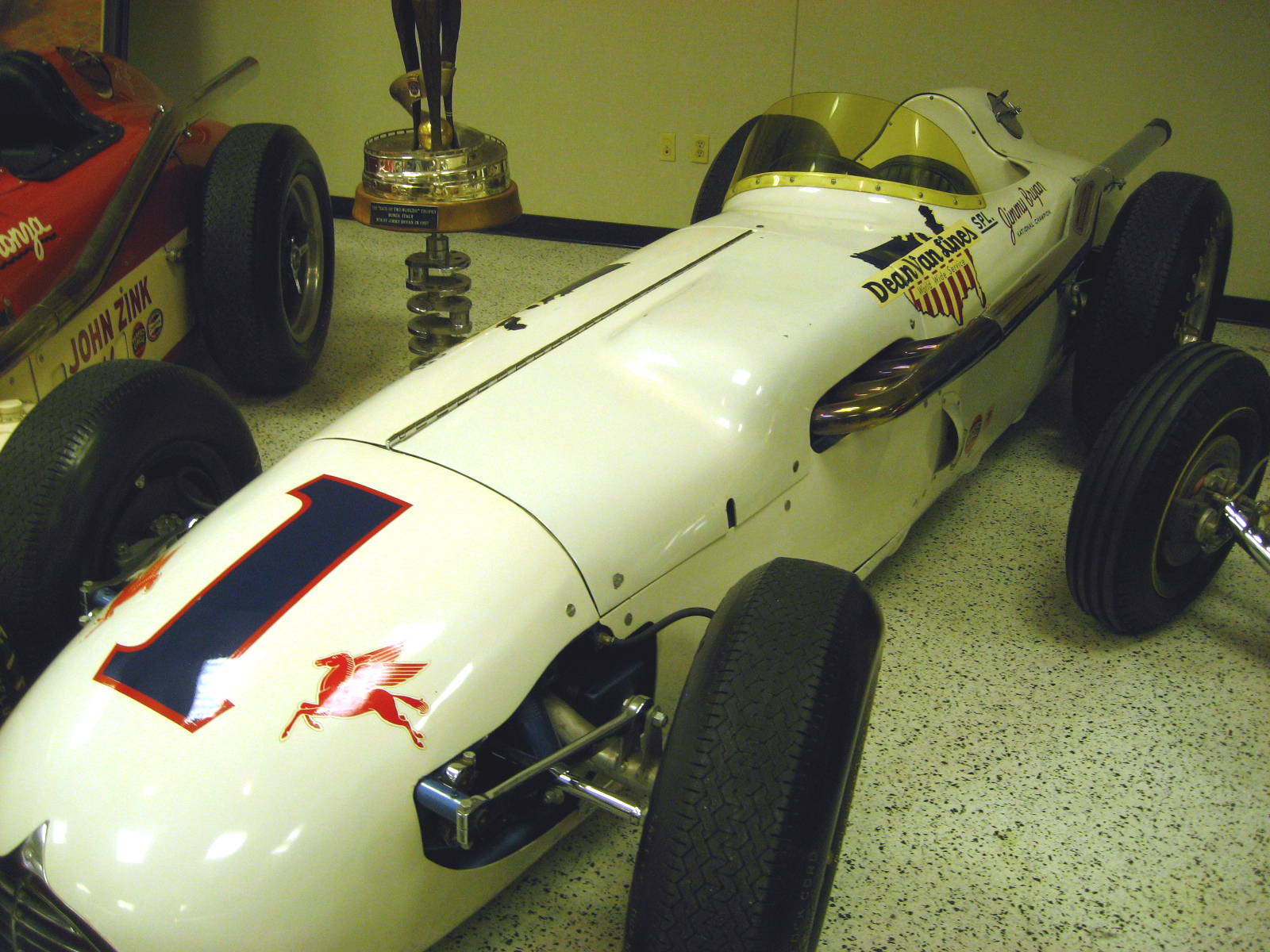
A Kuzma-Offenhauser driven by Jimmy Bryan, which won the 1957 Race of Two Worlds

Kuzma died on October 12, 1996 of kidney failure in Tigard, Oregon, at the age of 85. In 2003, he was posthumously honored in the Indianapolis Motor Speedway Museum.

=== Select Indianapolis 500 results ===
Kuzma cars competed in the FIA World Championship (Indianapolis 500 only) from 1951 to 1960. They won the 1952 Indianapolis 500 with Troy Ruttman.

Note: all cars were fitted with Offenhauser engines.

Season	Driver	Grid	Classification	Points	Note	Race Report
1951	Walt Faulkner	14	Ret		Engine	Report
1952	Troy Ruttman	7	1	8		Report
1953	Tony Bettenhausen	6	9		Accident	Report
1953	Manny Ayulo	4	13		Engine	Report
1953	Bob Sweikert	29	Ret		Suspension	Report
1953	Pat Flaherty	24	Ret		Accident	Report
1953	Chuck Stevenson	16	Ret		Fuel Leak	Report
1954	Jimmy Bryan	3	2	6		Report
1954	Chuck Stevenson	5	12			Report
1954	Manny Ayulo	22	13			Report
1955	Johnny Thomson	33	4	3		Report
1955	Duane Carter	18	11			Report
1955	Jimmy Bryan	11	Ret		Fuel Pump	Report
1955	Rodger Ward	30	Ret		Accident	Report
1956	Bob Sweikert	10	6			Report
1956	Gene Hartley	22	11			Report
1956	Eddie Johnson	32	15			Report
1956	Billy Garrett	29	16			Report
1956	Jimmy Bryan	19	19			Report
1956	Johnny Thomson	18	Ret		Spun Off	Report
1957	Jimmy Bryan	15	3	4		Report
1957	Johnny Thomson	11	12			Report
1957	Chuck Weyant	25	14			Report
1957	Eddie Sachs	2	Ret		Fuel Leak	Report
1958	Johnnie Tolan	30	13			Report
1958	Dempsey Wilson	32	Ret		Fire	Report
1958	A. J. Foyt	12	Ret		Spun Off	Report
1958	Eddie Sachs	18	Ret		Transmission	Report
1958	Art Bisch	28	Ret		Accident	Report
1959	A. J. Foyt	17	10			Report
1959	Gene Hartley	9	11			Report
1959	Eddie Sachs	2	Ret		Spun Off	Report
1959	Al Keller	28	Ret		Engine	Report
1959	Bill Cheesbourg	30	Ret		Magneto	Report
1960	Duane Carter	27	12			Report
1960	Bill Homeier	31	13			Report
