= Sam Hanks =

American racing driver (1914–1994)

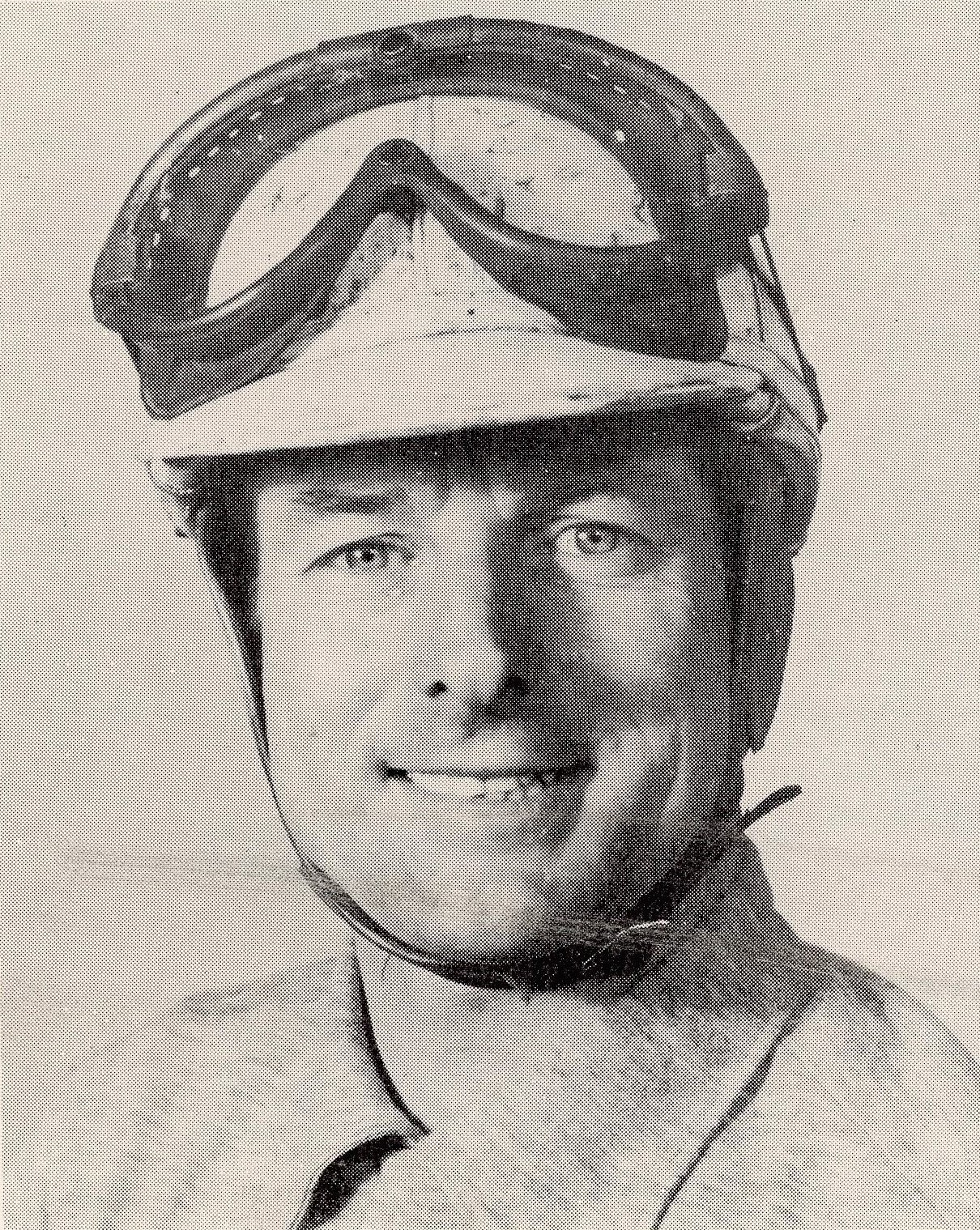
- Hanks, circa 1957
- Born: Samuel Dwight Hanks; July 13, 1914 Columbus, Ohio, U.S.
- Died: June 27, 1994 (aged 79) Pacific Palisades, California, U.S.

Championship titles
- AAA West Coast Midget Car (1946); AAA National Midget Car (1949); AAA Championship Car (1953); Major victories Indianapolis 500 (1957)

Champ Car career
- 43 races run over 14 years
- Best finish: 1st (1953)
- First race: 1940 Indianapolis 500 (Indianapolis)
- Last race: 1957 Indianapolis 500 (Indianapolis)
- First win: 1953 Springfield 100 (Springfield)
- Last win: 1957 Indianapolis 500 (Indianapolis)
Wins	Podiums	Poles
4	17	1

Formula One World Championship career
- Active years: 1950–1957
- Team(s): Kurtis Kraft, Salih
- Entries: 8
- Championships: 0
- Wins: 1
- Podiums: 4
- Career points: 20
- Pole positions: 0
- Fastest laps: 0
- First entry: 1950 Indianapolis 500
- First win: 1957 Indianapolis 500
- Last entry: 1957 Indianapolis 500

Samuel Dwight Hanks (July 13, 1914 – June 27, 1994) was an American racing driver who won the 1957 Indianapolis 500. He was a barnstormer, and raced midget and Championship cars.

== Racing career ==
Hanks was born in Columbus, Ohio and lived in Alhambra, California from the age of six. He attended Alhambra High School.

Hanks won his first championship in 1937 on the West Coast in the American Midget Association (AMA). He barnstormed the country, racing on the board tracks at Soldier Field in Chicago. Hanks reportedly won the first two board track races at Soldier Field in 1939. He won the 1940 VFW Motor City Speedway championship in Detroit. During the Second World War, Hanks served in the Army Air Corps.

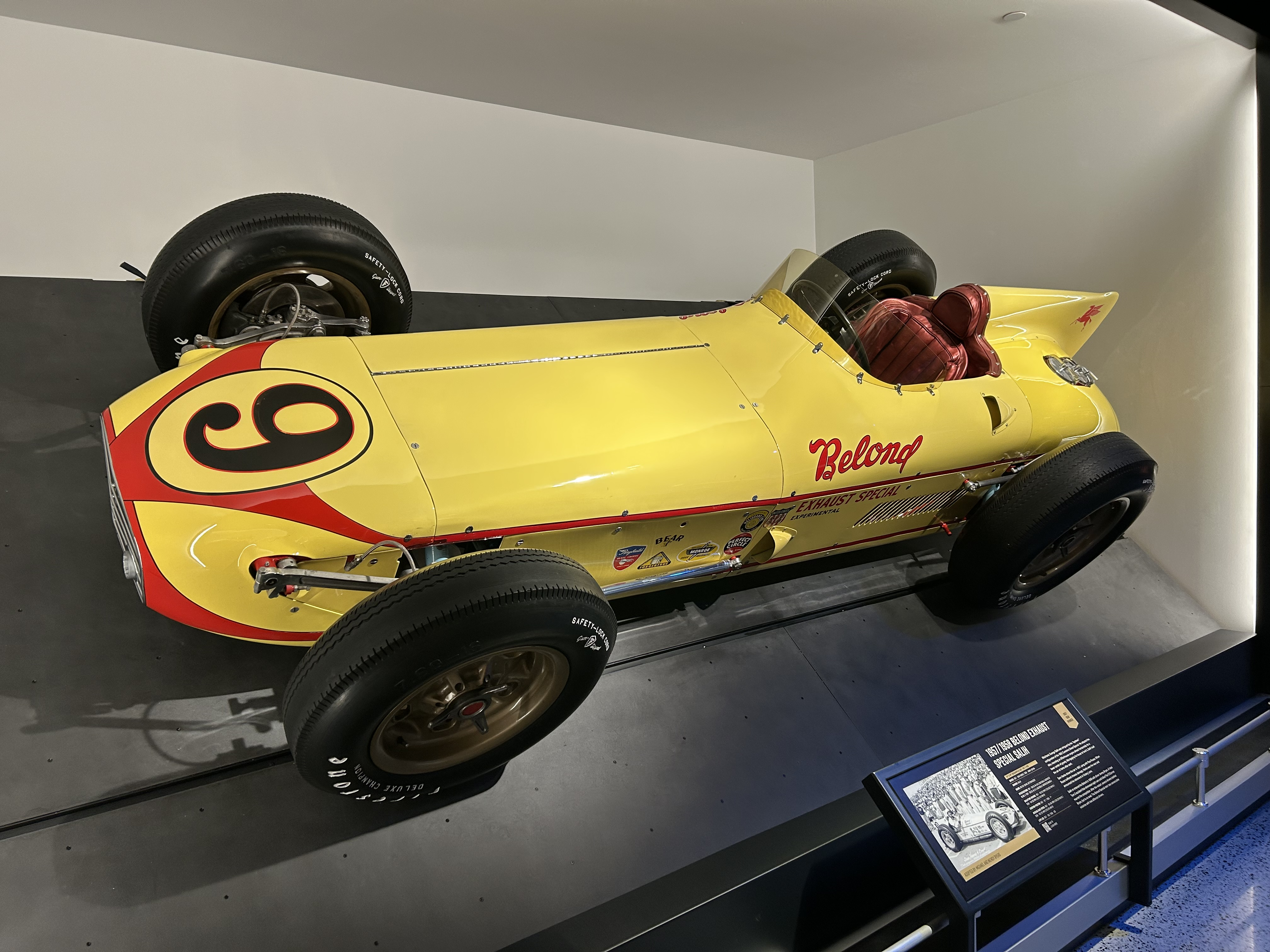
Hanks' winning car from the 1957 Indianapolis 500

After World War II, Hanks captured the 1946 United Racing Association (URA) Blue Circuit Championship. He won the 1947 Night before the 500 midget car race. He was the 1949 AAA National Midget champion. He won the 1953 AAA National Championship in the Bardahl Special. He won the 1956 Pacific Coast championship in the USAC Stock Cars.

Hanks considered retiring following the 1956 Indianapolis 500, but agreed to return for the 1957 race at the urging of car owner George Salih. 1957 was his 13th appearance in the 500, although in 1941, he merely was credited with finishing 33rd despite not racing, he had been injured in a practice crash the day before the race and withdrew. In his twelfth race where he raced on the track, he finally won, setting a record for the most tries before becoming a winner at Indy and announced his retirement from racing in Victory Circle (Tony Kanaan would win his first Indy in his 12th Indy 500 appearance in 2013). He did not stop racing immediately following his victory, however, but completed his contract to run a stock car for the remainder of the 1957 season.

=== World Drivers' Championship career ===
The AAA/USAC-sanctioned Indianapolis 500 was included in the FIA World Drivers' Championship from 1950 through 1960. Drivers competing at Indianapolis during those years were credited with World Drivers' Championship participation, and were eligible to score WDC points alongside those which they may have scored towards the AAA/USAC National Championship.

Hanks participated in eight World Drivers' Championship races at Indianapolis. He won once, and finished in the top three four times. He scored 20 World Drivers' Championship points.

== Television appearance ==
Hanks portrayed himself in the episode "The Comedians" of the CBS situation comedy Mr. Adams and Eve, starring Ida Lupino and Howard Duff. The episode aired on November 8, 1957.

== Later life ==
Hanks drove the pace car at the Indianapolis 500 from 1958 to 1963.

Hanks is believed to be the only Indianapolis 500 driver to participate in the race before World War II, serve in the war effort, then return to race again after the war. It has also been conjectured that Hanks may have been a distant relative to Abraham Lincoln.

Having experienced ill health for three years, Hanks died at his home in Pacific Palisades, California on June 27, 1994, aged 79.

== Awards and honors ==
Hanks has been inducted into the following halls of fame:

- Auto Racing Hall of Fame (1981)
- National Midget Auto Racing Hall of Fame (1984)
- Michigan Motor Sports Hall of Fame (1984)
- National Sprint Car Hall of Fame (1998)
- Motorsports Hall of Fame of America (2000)
- West Coast Stock Car/Motorsports Hall of Fame (2005)
- Alhambra High School Hall of Fame

Hanks has been awarded the following honors:

- Automotive Hall of Fame Distinguished Service Citation (1971)

== Motorsports career results ==
=== AAA/USAC Championship Car results ===
Year	1	2	3	4	5	6	7	8	9	10	11	12	13	14	15	Pos	Points
1946	INDY; 31	LAN	ATL	ISF	MIL	GOS										-	0
1947	INDY; DNQ	MIL	LAN	ATL	BAI	MIL	GOS	MIL	PIK	SPR	ARL					-	0
1948	ARL	INDY; 26	MIL	LAN	MIL	SPR	MIL	DUQ	ATL	PIK	SPR	DUQ				-	0
1949	ARL	INDY; 30	MIL; DNQ	TRE	SPR	MIL; DNQ	DUQ; DNQ	PIK	SYR	DET	SPR	LAN	SAC; DNQ	DMR; DNP		-	0
1950	INDY; 30	MIL; DNQ	LAN	SPR	MIL	PIK	SYR	DET	SPR	SAC	PHX	BAY; 2	DAR			23rd	240
1951	INDY; 12	MIL	LAN	DAR	SPR	MIL	DUQ; 5	DUQ; 3	PIK	SYR; DNQ	DET; 5	DNC; 10	SJS; DNQ	PHX	BAY	16th	421.4
1952	INDY; 3	MIL; DNQ	RAL; 18	SPR; 3	MIL; 14	DET; DNQ	DUQ; 2	PIK	SYR; 12	DNC; 4	SJS; 5	PHX; 2				3rd	1,390
1953	INDY; 3	MIL; 10	SPR; 2	DET; 4	SPR; 1	MIL; 22	DUQ; 1	PIK	SYR; 4	ISF; 5	SAC; 3	PHX; 3				1st	1,659.5
1954	INDY; 20	MIL; DNQ	LAN; 3	DAR; 8	SPR; 7	MIL; 6	DUQ; 1	PIK	SYR	ISF; 3	SAC; 15	PHX; 5	LVG; DNQ			8th	858.5
1955	INDY; 19	MIL	LAN	SPR	MIL	DUQ	PIK	SYR	ISF	SAC	PHX; DNQ					-	0
1956	INDY; 2	MIL	LAN	DAR	ATL	SPR	MIL	DUQ	SYR	ISF	SAC	PHX				9th	800
1957	INDY; 1	LAN	MIL	DET	ATL	SPR	MIL	DUQ	SYR	ISF	TRE	SAC	PHX			9th	1,000

- 1946 table only includes results of the six races run to "championship car" specifications. Points total includes the 71 races run to "big car" specifications.

=== Indianapolis 500 results ===
Year	Car	Start	Qual	Rank	Finish	Laps	Led	Retired
1940	28	14	123.064	13	13	192	0	Flagged
1941	28	33	118.211	32	33	0	0	DNS
1946	32	3	124.762	7	31	18	0	Oil line
1948	76	15	124.266	19	26	34	0	Clutch
1949	18	23	127.809	17	30	20	0	Oil leak
1950	23	25	131.593	13	30	42	0	Oil pressure
1951	25	12	132.998	21	12	135	0	SpunT3
1952	18	5	135.736	14	3rd	200	0	Running
1953	3	9	137.531	5	3rd*	200	3	Running
1954	1	10	137.994	25	20	191	1	Spun FS
1955	8	6	140.187	6	19	134	0	Transmission
1956	4	13	142.051	21	2nd	200	0	Running
1957	9	13	142.812	6	1st	200	136	Running
Totals						1566	140	

Starts	13
Poles	0
Front Row	1
Wins	1
Top 5	4
Top 10	4
Retired	8

* Shared drive with Duane Carter

Preceded by Pat Flaherty	Indianapolis 500 Winner; 1957	Succeeded by Jimmy Bryan
