= 1956 Indianapolis 500 =

American motor race

40th Indianapolis 500
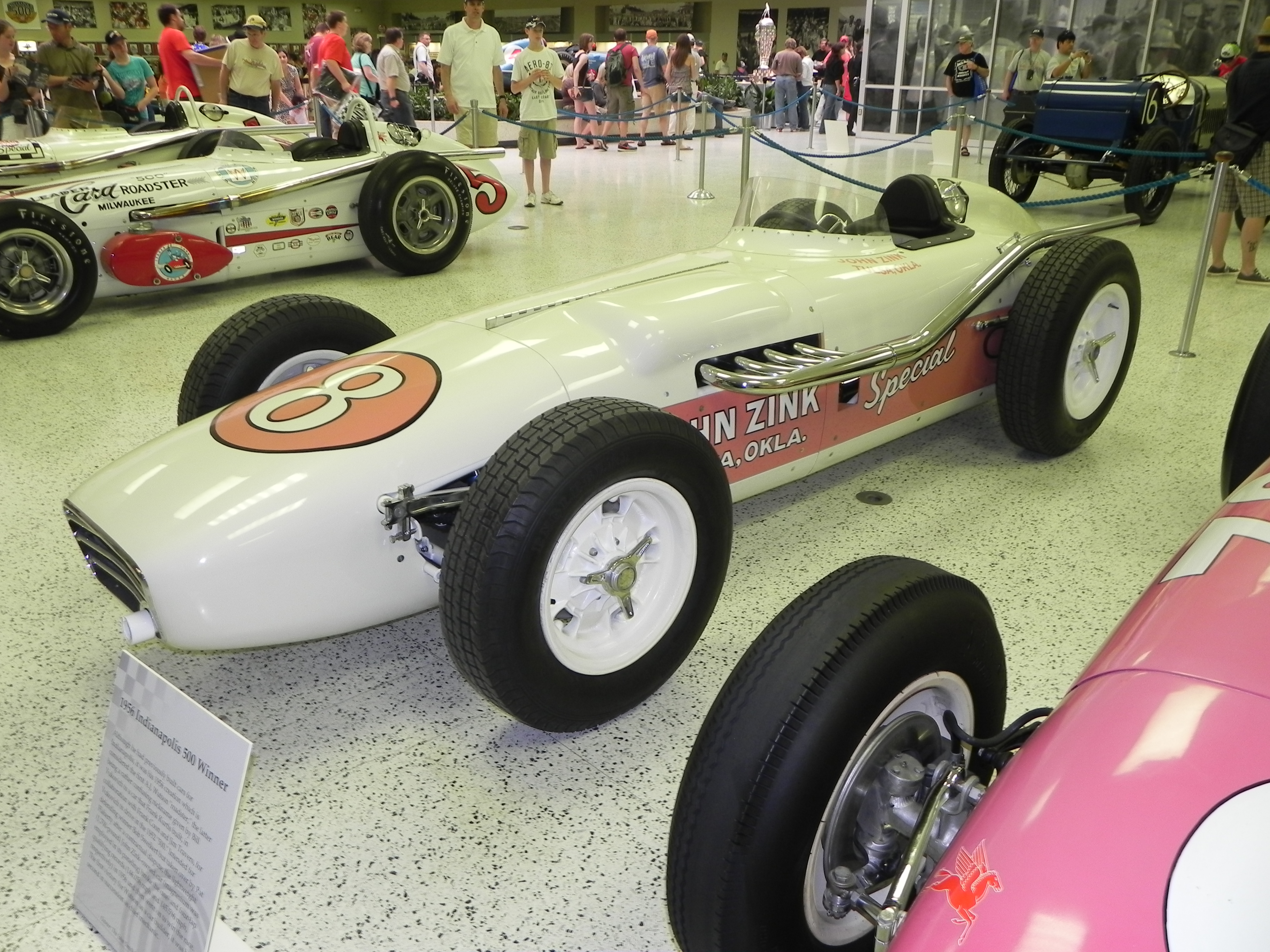

Indianapolis Motor Speedway

Indianapolis 500
- Sanctioning body: USAC
- Date: May 30, 1956
- Winner: Pat Flaherty
- Winning team: John Zink
- Winning Chief Mechanic: A. J. Watson
- Time of race: 3:53:28.84
- Average speed: 128.490 mph (206.785 km/h)
- Pole position: Pat Flaherty
- Pole speed: 145.596 mph (234.314 km/h)
- Most laps led: Pat Flaherty – 127 laps

Pre-race ceremonies
- Pace car: DeSoto Fireflite
- Pace car driver: L. Irving Woolson
- Starter: Bill Vanderwater
- Honorary referee: Herman Teetor
- Estimated attendance: 125,000-150,000

Chronology
Previous	Next
1955	1957

The 40th International 500-Mile Sweepstakes was held at the Indianapolis Motor Speedway on Wednesday, May 30, 1956. The event was part of the 1956 USAC National Championship Trail and was also race 3 of 8 in the 1956 World Championship of Drivers. The 1956 race was the first to be governed by the United States Automobile Club. The AAA withdrew from auto racing the previous August after a succession of incidents, including the Le Mans disaster and the fatal crash of Bill Vukovich during the 1955 race. Another change was made to the track that would have an immediate effect on the racing. The vast majority of the circuit was paved over in asphalt. A short stretch approximately 600 yards in length was left brick along the mainstretch. Speeds were expected to climb, and qualifying records were expected to be shattered during time trials.

The 1956 race is also known in Indy 500 lore as "Cagle's Miracle". Torrential rains pummeled the Speedway in the days leading up to the race. The track was full of standing water, access tunnels were completely flooded, and the infield was a muddy quagmire. The conditions threatened to postpone or outright cancel the race. Speedway superintendent Clarence Cagle supervised a massive cleanup effort, in which hundreds of thousands of gallons of water were pumped out of the tunnels and out of the infield. Cagle and his crew worked non-stop for 48 hours straight, some without sleep, and had the track ready just in time for race morning.

The race was slowed by a then-record eleven yellow caution light periods which totaled 1 hour, 11 minutes, and 15 seconds. The race was described by veteran sportswriters as "a series of sprint races between yellow lights". Pat Flaherty led a total of 127 laps en route to victory; taking the lead for good on lap 76. Sam Hanks - the popular veteran still searching for his first "500" victory - came home second, just 20 seconds behind. Hanks charged during the second half, but the numerous cautions stymied his chances to catch up to much less pass Flaherty. No less than twelve cars were involved in crashes or spins, including Dick Rathmann, who took the checkered flag to finish 5th, only to wreck in turn 1 on his cool down lap. Blown tires were the culprit for several of the incidents.

== Time trials ==
=== Saturday May 19 ===
Pole Day attracted a record crowd of 125,000 spectators. With the new asphalt surface, new track records were expected. Pat Flaherty won the pole position with a new one-lap track record of 146.056 mph and a new four-lap track record of 145.596 mph. A total of ten drivers would qualify faster than the old track record from 1954. Jim Rathmann and Pat O'Connor rounded out the front row.

Two cars suffered spins, Bob Christie and Jack Turner. Neither drivers were injured, and both would ultimately make the field. Ed Elisian waved off twice before making the field on his third and final attempt. By the end of the day, the field was filled to 17 cars.

=== Sunday May 20 ===
The second day of Time Trials was held on Sunday May 20. Twelve cars completed qualifying attempts, and the field was filled to 29 cars. Johnny Thomson (145.549 mph) was the fastest driver of the day. Thomson's speed was the second-fastest in the entire field, just 0.08 seconds slower than polesitter Pat Flaherty's time. At the end of the first weekend of time trials, there were only four spots left open in the grid.

=== Saturday May 26 ===
The third day of Time Trials was scheduled for Saturday May 26. Rain washed out all track activity for the day.

=== Sunday May 27 ===
The fourth and final day of Time Trials was scheduled for Sunday May 27. USAC officials announced Sunday morning that a minimum of two hours would be made available for qualifying. Eighteen cars lined up intending to make a qualifying attempt, however, rain persisted throughout the day. Six cars were able to take to the track, and five completed runs. The field was filled to 33 cars, with one car (Eddie Sachs) bumped. Eddie Johnson, the last car to make it out, completed his run in the rain.

One of the drivers not able to qualify was Giuseppe "Nino" Farina. He was unable to get his Bardahl-Ferrari up to speed, and he did not make a qualifying attempt.

Qualifying had lasted only 57 minutes before more rains came. With 12 cars still waiting in line, USAC officials announced that they would extended qualifying beyond the 6 o'clock gun in order to allow those cars a chance. Around 7:30 p.m., the skies opened up, and any chance to continue qualifying before sunset was lost. After a late-night meeting, USAC announced that they would re-open qualifying on Monday morning at 8 a.m. The track would be available for exactly 63 minutes (to fulfill the two hours they promised on Sunday morning). Jean Marcenac, chief mechanic for the Novi team, threatened to withdraw the already-qualified car of Paul Russo in protest of the decision. He claimed that the officials miscalculated the time needed for all 12 cars to get a fair shot; and that his team's other driver (Eddie Russo) had virtually no chance to make it to the front of the line.

The issue became moot as torrential rains flooded the Speedway during Sunday night and into Monday. The extra qualifying session was cancelled, and the field was set. On Carburetion Day (Tuesday May 29), rain had finally stopped, allowing a brief, 45-minute practice session. Meanwhile, parts of the facility were badly flooded, and the infield was a muddy quagmire. With the race scheduled for Wednesday, track superintendent Clarence Cagle oversaw a massive clean-up effort.

== Starting grid ==
Row	Inside		Middle		Outside	
1	8	(United States) Pat Flaherty	24	(United States) Jim Rathmann	7	(United States) Pat O'Connor
2	73	(United States) Dick Rathmann	99	(United States) Tony Bettenhausen	98	(United States) Johnnie Parsons W
3	47	(United States) Fred Agabashian	29	(United States) Paul Russo	5	(United States) Andy Linden
4	1	(United States) Bob Sweikert W	53	(United States) Troy Ruttman W	15	(United States) Johnny Boyd
5	4	(United States) Sam Hanks	10	(United States) Ed Elisian	19	(United States) Rodger Ward
6	48	(United States) Jimmy Daywalt	49	(United States) Ray Crawford	88	(United States) Johnny Thomson
7	2	(United States) Jimmy Bryan	89	(United States) Keith Andrews	26	(United States) Jimmy Reece
8	82	(United States) Gene Hartley	14	(United States) Bob Veith R	54	(United States) Jack Turner R
9	57	(United States) Bob Christie R	16	(United States) Don Freeland	12	(United States) Al Herman
10	55	(United States) Al Keller	41	(United States) Billy Garrett R	27	(United States) Cliff Griffith
11	34	(United States) Johnnie Tolan R	81	(United States) Eddie Johnson	64	(United States) Duke Dinsmore

R Indianapolis 500 rookie
W Indianapolis 500 winner

=== Alternates ===
- First alternate: Eddie Sachs R (#58)
- Second alternate: none

=== Failed to Qualify - Waiting in line when qualifying ended ===
- Marshall Teague (#3, #47)
- Eddie Russo (#10, #27, #33)
- Mike Magill R (#74)
- Shorty Templeman (#46)
- Tony Bonadies R (#25)
- Len Duncan (#51)
- Earl Motter R (#9, #41)
- Johnny Kay R (#35)
- Danny Kladis (#91)
- Jim McWithey R (#77)
- Bill Cheesbourg R (#84, #87)

=== Failed to Qualify ===
- Dempsey Wilson R (#22, #79) – Incomplete run
- Johnny Baldwin R (#91)
- Jimmy Davies (#31)
- Giuseppe "Nino" Farina R (#9)
- Elmer George R (#78)
- Ernie McCoy
- Duke Nalon (#31)
- Roy Newman R (#74)
- Cal Niday
- Dickie Reese R (#87)
- Gig Stephens R (#85)
- Leroy Warriner R (#93)
- Chuck Weyant (#22) - Injured
- Marvin Pifer R (#75) - Practice crash
- Len Sutton R (#62) - Practice crash
- Buddy Cagle R (#81) - Wrecked rookie test
- Edgar Elder R (#41) - Did not finish rookie test
- Jay Abney R (#87) - Entry declined
- George Amick R (#33) - Entry declined, failed physical

== Race summary ==
=== Start ===
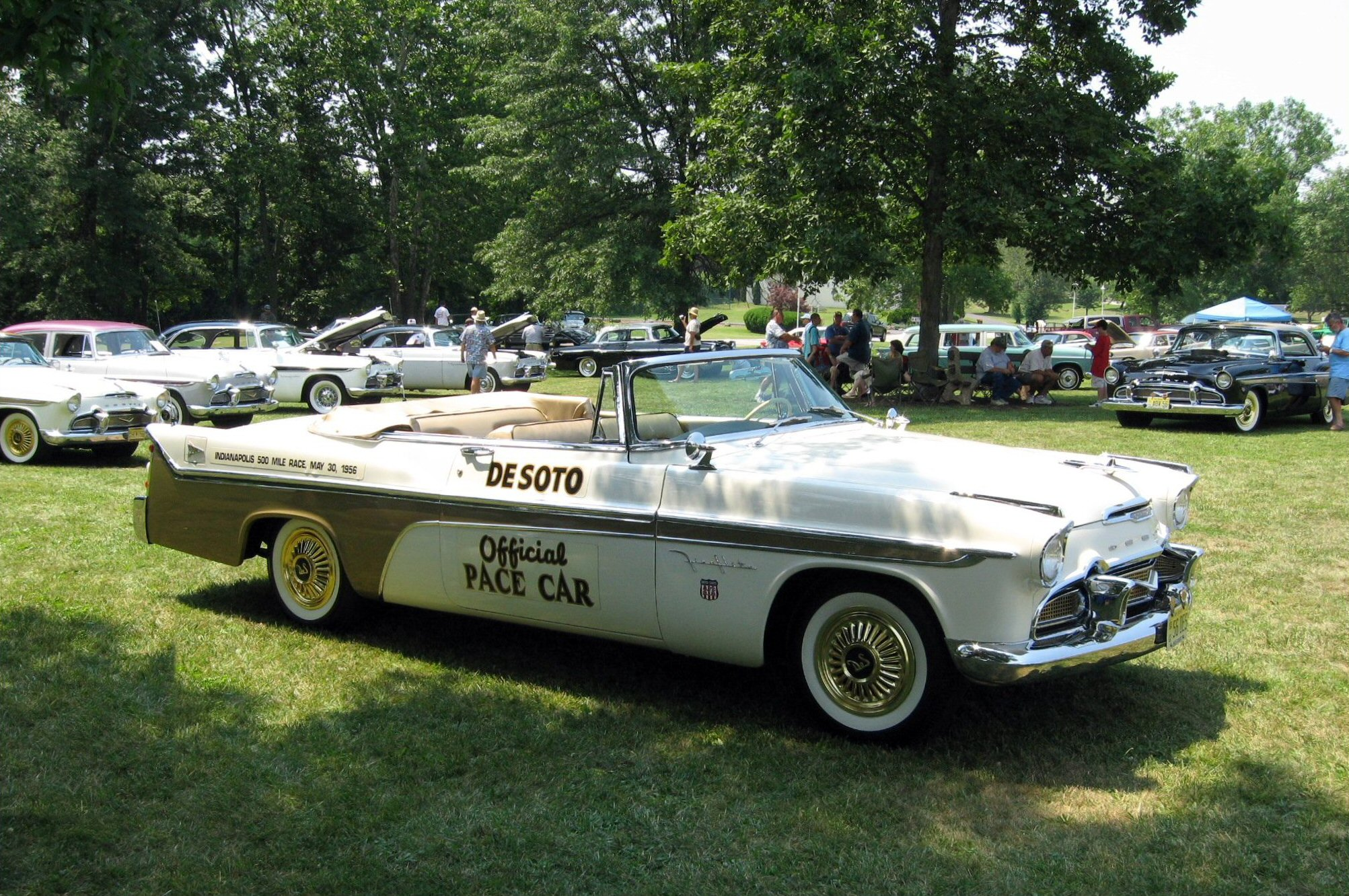
1956 DeSoto pace car

After torrential rains and flooding throughout the week, track crews had worked diligently for more than two days to clean up the grounds. Rumors of a postponement or an outright cancellation were unfounded. Showers fell overnight, but ceased by the time the gates opened at 5 a.m., and the facility was ready to go. Race day dawned sunny and the track was dry. Tony Hulman gave the command to start engines at 10:56 a.m., and the field pulled away behind the DeSoto pace car.

At the start, Jim Rathmann grabbed the lead going into turn one from the middle of the front row. Pole winner Pat Flaherty followed in second, and Pat O'Connor third. Down the backstretch, O'Connor moved into second, followed by Tony Bettenhausen. Flaherty slipped to fourth. Rathmann completed the first lap at a record speed of 138.867 mph. On lap 4, O'Connor took the lead in turn three. The race was already unfolding as ultra-competitive, as the top four to five cars were running close together on the track and jockeying for position. Jimmy Daywalt pulled into the pits with magneto failure. His crew went to work to get him back in the race. On lap 11, Paul Russo in the Novi machine now led, with O'Connor second, and Flaherty third. Russo set a blistering pace, averaging 142.255 mph for the first twenty laps (50 miles), a new race record. Russo also set the fastest lap of the race on lap 19 (144.416 mph).

=== First half ===
On lap 22, Paul Russo was still leading, but going into turn one, he violently blew a right rear tire. The car broke into a spin, and crashed into the outside wall. Russo was not seriously injured. He climbed from the car and ran to the infield grass. The remnants of the tire flew into the grandstands, and two spectators suffered minor injuries. The first yellow caution period of the day came out, with Pat O'Connor now in the lead. Under the caution, another crash occurred. Johnny Thomson lost control at the south end of the mainstretch, hitting the inside pit wall, and swerving out into the path of other cars. Johnnie Tolan, Keith Andrews, Sam Hanks and Troy Ruttman also became involved, with Ruttman spinning out and coming to a rest in the infield in turn one. The most serious injury was to a pit crew member, who suffered a broken leg when Thomson's car careened towards the pits. The yellow light would stay on for over 15 minutes to clear the track and clean up an oil spill caused by the accident. Tolan, Hanks, and Andrews would continue, but Thomson and Ruttman were out of the race.

The green came back out on lap 31. Pat O'Connor led, with Pat Flaherty close behind. The two drivers swapped the lead multiple times over the next several laps. At the 40-lap mark (100 miles), the top five was Flaherty, O'Connor, Johnnie Parsons, Tony Bettenhausen, and Jim Rathmann. The second yellow came out when Ray Crawford spun at the north end of the mainstretch. After a series of pit stops by the leaders, Johnnie Parsons now led. Don Freeland moved into second, then took the lead when Parsons made his pit stop on lap 72.

Al Herman's car locked up the rear wheels and crashed near the start/finish line on lap 75. It brought out the third yellow of the afternoon. Freeland and Bob Sweikert, running 1st-2nd, came into the pits during the yellow. Tony Bettenhausen suffered a small fire in the pits, but it was quickly extinguished and he was able to rejoin the race. When the green came back out on lap 88, Pat Flaherty was now in front.

Don Freeland did a spin in turn two on lap 96, but was able to drive the car back to the pits. The yellow light was on for about two laps. At the halfway point, Pat Flaherty led, with Sam Hanks second, and Bob Sweikert third. Andy Linden pulled into the pits with the car smoking, and he was forced to drop out with an oil leak.

=== Second half ===
Tire problems were befalling numerous drivers. Officials from Firestone believed that the high track temperature was responsible for the many tire failures. Lee Wallard, observing the race on the radio network, felt that the drivers were racing too hard and were wearing out their tires. He conjectured that some drivers were unwilling to pit for new tires because they did not want to give up valuable track position. Keith Andrews, as-such, reportedly blew a right-front tire, and spun on the mainstretch. He later dropped out with transmission failure.

Pat Flaherty continued to lead, with Bob Sweikert second, and Sam Hanks third. All three cars were on the lead lap. But on lap 130, Sweikert shredded a right-rear tire in turn two. He brushed the outside wall down the backstretch, but was able to limp back to the pit area on the rim. He lost a lot of time, but he was able to get back in the race. Under the ensuing yellow, Flaherty came in for a pit stop for fuel and the crew changed his right-rear tire. The stop lasted 37 seconds, and he came back out still holding the lead.

At the 150-lap mark (350 miles), Flaherty led with Freeland second, and Hanks third. Jimmy Daywalt crashed hard on the leader's lap 149. A small fire broke out, and the car came to rest against the wall at the exit of turn two. With the field slowed once again under the yellow, Flaherty's lead was about 30 seconds.

The green light came back out on lap 159, but it was short-lived. Tony Bettenhausen blew a right-rear tire and crashed in the south shortchute. The yellow would stay on for another seven minutes. After running in the top ten most of the day, Jim Rathmann's car began smoking noticeably. After a number of laps off the pace, he pulled into the garage area on lap 176 with engine failure due to low oil pressure.

With the green back on for lap 166, Sam Hanks began to charge and started to cut into Flaherty's lead. Hanks had trimmed the deficit to about 18 seconds when Eddie Russo (driving Ed Elisian's car) stalled out on the track. The yellow light was on for two minutes.

=== Finish ===
With twenty laps to go, Flaherty continued to lead, with Hanks solidly in second, and Freeland third. Flaherty's lead was back up to about 26 seconds. Running in fourth place with just 13 laps to go, Pat O'Connor dropped out with magneto failure. In the final ten laps, Hanks was unable to close the gap. Pat Flaherty took the checkered flag and won by a margin of 20.45 seconds over Sam Hanks. Don Freeland finished third, and Johnnie Parsons fourth. Dick Rathmann, (who had spun earlier), crossed the finish line to finish fifth, only to crash in turn one on his cool-down lap. Rathmann initially feared he still had one lap to go, but when scoring serials were checked and settled after the race, it was confirmed he had completed all 200 laps and officially placed 5th.

Flaherty, driving for the John Zink team, notably notched the first Indy 500 victory for the famous Watson roadster. In his 12th attempt, veteran Sam Hanks was still searching for his elusive first Indy victory. Flaherty was the last driver to win the "500" wearing a t-shirt. All subsequent winners have worn flame retardant uniforms. Flaherty also sported a green shamrock on his helmet, eschewing longtime Indy superstitions against using the color green. Flaherty claimed that shortly after he crossed the finish line, his throttle linkage broke, preventing him taking any extra "insurance" laps, as many drivers were known to do at the time.

- Source: The Indianapolis News, The Indianapolis Star, The Star Press, The Dispatch

== Box score ==
Finish	Grid	No.	Driver	Constructor	Qualifying		Laps	Status	Points	
Finish	Grid	No.	Driver	Constructor	Speed	Rank	Laps	Status	USAC	WDC
1	1	8	(United States) Pat Flaherty	Watson-Offenhauser	145.59	1	200	128.490 mph	1,000	8
2	13	4	(United States) Sam Hanks	Kurtis Kraft-Offenhauser	142.05	21	200	+20.45	800	6
3	26	16	(United States) Don Freeland	Phillips-Offenhauser	141.69	22	200	+1:30.23	700	4
4	6	98	(United States) Johnnie Parsons W	Kurtis Kraft-Offenhauser	144.14	7	200	+3:25.69	600	3
5	4	73	(United States) Dick Rathmann	Kurtis Kraft-Offenhauser	144.47	6	200	+4:21.81	500	2
6	10	1	(United States) Bob Sweikert W	Kuzma-Offenhauser	143.03	12	200	+5:35.05	400	
7	23	14	(United States) Bob Veith R	Kurtis Kraft-Offenhauser	142.53	16	200	+6:25.63	300	
8	15	19	(United States) Rodger Ward	Kurtis Kraft-Offenhauser	141.17	27	200	+6:32.31	250	
9	21	26	(United States) Jimmy Reece	Lesovsky-Offenhauser	142.88	14	200	+6:38.31	200	
10	30	27	(United States) Cliff Griffith	Stevens-Offenhauser	141.47	24	199	-1 Lap	150	
11	22	82	(United States) Gene Hartley	Kuzma-Offenhauser	142.84	15	196	-4 Laps	100	
12	7	42	(United States) Fred Agabashian	Kurtis Kraft-Offenhauser	144.06	8	196	-4 Laps	50	
13	25	57	(United States) Bob Christie R	Kurtis Kraft-Offenhauser	142.23	20	196	-4 Laps		
14	28	55	(United States) Al Keller	Kurtis Kraft-Offenhauser	141.19	26	195	-5 Laps		
15	32	81	(United States) Eddie Johnson	Kuzma-Offenhauser	139.09	32	195	-5 Laps		
16	29	41	(United States) Billy Garrett R	Kuzma-Offenhauser	140.55	30	194	-6 Laps		
17	33	64	(United States) Duke Dinsmore	Kurtis Kraft-Offenhauser	138.53	33	191	-9 Laps		
18	3	7	(United States) Pat O'Connor	Kurtis Kraft-Offenhauser	144.98	4	187	Magneto		
19	19	2	(United States) Jimmy Bryan	Kuzma-Offenhauser	143.74	9	185	-15 Laps		
20	2	24	(United States) Jim Rathmann	Kurtis Kraft-Offenhauser	145.12	3	175	Engine		
21	31	34	(United States) Johnnie Tolan R	Kurtis Kraft-Offenhauser	140.06	31	173	Engine		
22	5	99	(United States) Tony Bettenhausen	Kurtis Kraft-Offenhauser	144.60	5	160	Accident		
23	14	10	(United States) Ed Elisian (Eddie Russo Laps 124–160)	Kurtis Kraft-Offenhauser	141.38	25	160	Brakes		
24	16	48	(United States) Jimmy Daywalt	Kurtis Kraft-Offenhauser	140.97	28	134	Accident		
25	24	54	(United States) Jack Turner R	Kurtis Kraft-Offenhauser	142.39	18	131	Engine		
26	20	89	(United States) Keith Andrews	Kurtis Kraft-Offenhauser	142.97	13	94	Transmission		
27	9	5	(United States) Andy Linden	Kurtis Kraft-Offenhauser	143.05	11	90	Oil Leak		
28	27	12	(United States) Al Herman	Kurtis Kraft-Offenhauser	141.61	23	74	Accident		
29	17	49	(United States) Ray Crawford	Kurtis Kraft-Offenhauser	140.88	29	49	Accident		
30	12	15	(United States) Johnny Boyd	Kurtis Kraft-Offenhauser	142.33	19	35	Oil Leak		
31	11	53	(United States) Troy Ruttman W	Kurtis Kraft-Offenhauser	142.48	17	22	Spun Off		
32	18	88	(United States) Johnny Thomson	Kuzma-Offenhauser	145.54	2	22	Spun Off		
33	8	29	(United States) Paul Russo	Kurtis Kraft-Novi	143.54	10	21	Accident		1^{1}

Note: Relief drivers in parentheses

W Former Indianapolis 500 winner

R Indianapolis 500 Rookie

All entrants utilized Firestone tires.

^1 – 1 point for fastest lead lap

=== Race statistics ===
Lap Leaders
Laps	Leader
1–3	Jim Rathmann
4–10	Pat O'Connor
11–21	Paul Russo
22–40	Pat O'Connor
41	Pat Flaherty
42–44	Pat O'Connor
45	Pat Flaherty
46–55	Pat O'Connor
56–71	Johnnie Parsons
72–75	Don Freeland
76–200	Pat Flaherty

Total laps led
Driver	Laps
Pat Flaherty	127
Pat O'Connor	39
Johnnie Parsons	16
Paul Russo	11
Don Freeland	4
Jim Rathmann	3

Yellow Lights: 1 hour, 11 minutes, 15 seconds
Laps*	Reason
22–32	Paul Russo crash in turn 1 Johnny Thomson crash on frontstretch Andrews, Ruttman spin in turn 1 (15:45)
50–54	Ray Crawford spin on mainstretch (8:00)
75–88	Al Herman crash on mainstretch (approx. 20 minutes)
96–97	Don Freeland spin in turn 2 (approx. 1 min.)
105–106	Keith Andrews spun in turn 4 (approx. 1 min.)
115–119	Jimmy Bryan spin in southchute (approx. 8 mins.)
130–131	Bob Sweikert blew tire, hit wall in turn 2 (approx. 1 min.)
149–158	Jimmy Daywalt crash in turn 2 (7:40)
161–165	Tony Bettenhausen crash in turn 2 (7:25)
179–180	Eddie Russo stalled on track Dick Rathmann spin in northchute (2:00)
Extra time	Dick Rathmann crash in turn 1
* – Approximate lap counts

== Broadcasting ==
=== Radio ===
The race was carried live on the IMS Radio Network. Sid Collins served as chief announcer. The broadcast was carried by over 280 affiliates, as well as Armed Forces Radio. The broadcast came on-air at 10:45 a.m. local time, fifteen minutes prior to the start of the race. This was the final broadcast based out of the old wooden Pagoda, which was demolished after the race. Guests in the booth included senator William E. Jenner, L. Irving Woolson (DeSoto), L.L. "Tex" Colbert (Chrysler), and USAC competition director Duane Carter.

This was also the final year to have only two turn reporters ("south turns" and "north turns"). Beginning in 1957, the crew would be expanded to have one reporter in each of the four turns. Lee Wallard, the 1951 winner, joined the broadcast as guest commentator. Wallard visited the booth several times at periodic intervals to offer color commentary and observations.

Indianapolis Motor Speedway Radio Network
Booth Announcers	Turn Reporters	Pit reporters
Chief Announcer: Sid Collins; Analyst: Charlie Brockman; Guest commentator: Lee Wallard	South turns: Bill Frosch; Backstretch: Bernie Herman; North turns: Jim Shelton	Luke Walton (north pits); Greg Smith (south pits); Bob Rhodes (garages)

== World Drivers' Championship ==
1956 Indianapolis 500
Race 3 of 9 in the 1956 Formula One season
← Previous race	Next race →

Race details
- Date: May 30, 1956
- Location: Indianapolis Motor Speedway; Speedway, Indiana
- Course: Permanent racing facility
- Course length: 4.023 km (2.500 miles)
- Distance: 200 laps, 804.672 km (500.000 miles)

=== Background ===
The Indianapolis 500 was included in the FIA World Championship of Drivers from 1950 through 1960. The race was sanctioned by AAA through 1955, and then by USAC beginning in 1956. At the time the new world championship was announced and first organized by the CSI, the United States did not yet have a Grand Prix. Indianapolis Motor Speedway vice president and general manager Theodore E. "Pop" Meyers lobbied that the Indianapolis 500 be selected as the race to represent the country and to pay points towards the world championship.

Drivers competing at the Indianapolis 500 in 1950 through 1960 were credited with participation in and earned points towards the World Championship of Drivers. However, the machines competing at Indianapolis were not necessarily run to Formula One specifications and regulations. The drivers also earned separate points (on a different scale) towards the respective AAA or USAC national championships. No points, however, were awarded by the FIA towards the World Constructors' Championship.

=== Summary ===
The 1956 Indianapolis 500 was round 3 of 8 on the 1956 World Championship. The event, however, failed to attract interest from any of the regular competitors on the Grand Prix circuit. Former World Champion Giuseppe Farina entered, but struggled to get his car up to speed, and he was unable to make a qualifying attempt. Race winner Pat Flaherty earned 8 points towards the World Championship. Despite not competing in any of the other World Championship events, Flaherty finished fifth in the final season standings, the highest of any Indianapolis 500 race winner throughout the 11 years the race was on the WDC calendar.

==== World Drivers' Championship standings after the race ====
	Pos	Driver	Points
	1	(France) Jean Behra	10
	2	(Argentina) Juan Manuel Fangio	9
	3	(United Kingdom) Stirling Moss	8
22	4	(United States) Pat Flaherty	8
21	5	(United States) Sam Hanks	6

- Note: Only the top five positions are included.

== See also ==
- 1956 USAC Championship Car season

Previous race: 1956 Monaco Grand Prix	FIA Formula One World Championship; 1956 season	Next race: 1956 Belgian Grand Prix
Previous race: 1955 Indianapolis 500; Bob Sweikert	1956 Indianapolis 500; Pat Flaherty	Next race: 1957 Indianapolis 500; Sam Hanks
