= Keith Andrews (racing driver) =

American racing driver (1920–1957)

- Born: Keith Phillip Andrews; June 15, 1920 Denver, Colorado, U.S.
- Died: May 15, 1957 (aged 36) Speedway, Indiana, U.S.

Championship titles
- 1954 Pikes Peak International Hill Climb Winner

Champ Car career
- 10 races run over 8 years
- Years active: 1948, 1950, 1952–1957
- Best finish: 21st (tie) – 1954
- First race: 1950 Pikes Peak Hill Climb (Pikes Peak)
- Last race: 1956 Rex Mays Classic (Milwaukee)
- First win: 1954 Pikes Peak Hill Climb (Pikes Peak)
Wins	Podiums	Poles
1	2	0

Formula One World Championship career
- Active years: 1955–1957
- Team(s): Schroeder, Kurtis Kraft
- Entries: 3 (2 starts)
- Championships: 0
- Wins: 0
- Podiums: 0
- Career points: 0
- Pole positions: 0
- Fastest laps: 0
- First entry: 1955 Indianapolis 500
- Last entry: 1957 Indianapolis 500

Keith Phillip Andrews (June 15, 1920 – May 15, 1957) was an American racecar driver. He was killed after crashing his car during practice for the 1957 Indianapolis 500.

== Death ==
Giuseppe Farina was the only European driver on the entry list for the 1957 Indy 500, however, he did not attempt to qualify. Farina had difficulty getting his car up to speed, and had experienced handling problems. On May 15, Andrews stepped into Farina's car for a test run, but crashed. Down the frontstretch, Andrews began to slide, and when he attempted to correct, the car backed into the inside wall separating the pit area. Andrews was crushed to death between the cowl and the fuel tank, but no fire broke out. Farina withdrew after Andrews was killed, with no backup car to use.

== Racing record ==
=== Complete AAA/USAC Championship Car results ===
Year	Team	1	2	3	4	5	6	7	8	9	10	11	12	13	Pos	Points	Ref
1948	Stephens	ARL	INDY	MIL	LAN	MIL	SPR	MIL	DUQ	ATL	PIK; DNS	SPR	DUQ		NC	0	
1950		INDY	MIL	LAN	SPR	MIL	PIK; 27	SYR	DET	SPR	SAC	PHX	BAY	DAR	NC	0	
1952	Syer Brothers	INDY	MIL	RAL	SPR	MIL	DET	DUQ	PIK; 8	SYR					38th	50	
1952											DNC; DNQ	SJS	PHX		38th	50	
1953	Syer-Hal	INDY	MIL	SPR	DET	SPR	MIL	DUQ	PIK; 2	SYR	ISF	SAC	PHX		27th	160	
1954	Joe Hunt Magneto	INDY	MIL	LAN	DAR	SPR	MIL	DUQ	PIK; 1	SYR	ISF	SAC; 10	PHX	LVG	21st	230	
1955	McDaniel	INDY; 20	MIL	LAN	SPR	MIL	DUQ								35th	80	
1955	Joe Hunt Magneto							PIK; 6	SYR	ISF	SAC; 15	PHX; DNQ			35th	80	
1956	Harry Dunn	INDY; 26	MIL; 12	LAN	DAR	ATL	SPR	MIL	DUQ	SYR	ISF	SAC	PHX		35th	10	
1957	Giuseppe Farina	INDY; DNQ	LAN	MIL	DET	ATL	SPR	MIL	DUQ	SYR	ISF	TRE	SAC	PHX	NC	0	

=== Indianapolis 500 results ===
Year	Car	Start	Qual	Rank	Finish	Laps	Led	Retired
1955	31	28	136.049	28	20	120	0	Ignition
1956	89	20	142.976	13	26	94	0	Spun T4
Totals						214	0	

Starts	2
Poles	0
Front Row	0
Wins	0
Top 5	0
Top 10	0
Retired	2

=== Complete Formula One World Championship results ===
(key)

Year	Entrant	Chassis	Engine	1	2	3	4	5	6	7	8	WDC	Points
1955	John McDaniel	Schroeder	Offenhauser L4	ARG	MON	500; 20	BEL	NED	GBR	ITA		NC	0
1956	Harry Dunn	Kurtis Kraft 500B	Offenhauser L4	ARG	MON	500; 26	BEL	FRA	GBR	GER	ITA	NC	0
1957	Giuseppe Farina	Kurtis Kraft 500G	Offenhauser L4	ARG	MON	500; DNQ	FRA	GBR	GER	PES	ITA	NC	0

Preceded by Eugenio Castellotti	Formula One fatal accidents May 15, 1957	Succeeded by Pat O'Connor
