= 1956 USAC Championship Car season =

Sports season

- USAC National Championship Trail

Season
- Races: 12
- Start date: May 30
- End date: November 12

Awards
- National champion: (United States) Jimmy Bryan
- Indianapolis 500 winner: (United States) Pat Flaherty

The 1956 USAC Championship Car season consisted of 12 races, beginning in Speedway, Indiana, on May 30 and concluding in Phoenix, Arizona, on November 12. This was the first year the National Championship was sanctioned by the United States Automobile Club (USAC), which replaced the American Automobile Association (AAA) after the withdrawal of AAA from all forms of racing after the 1955 season.

There were also three non-championship events. The National Champion was Jimmy Bryan and the Indianapolis 500 winner was Pat Flaherty. Flaherty was unable to race after the Springfield race as he was severely injured in a crash during the race which essentially ended his full time racing career. The defending series champion Bob Sweikert was killed on June 17th during a Sprint Car race at Salem Speedway that was not part of the national championship.

== Schedule and results ==
Rnd	Date	Race name	Track	Location	Type	Pole position	Winning driver
1	May 30	(United States) International 500 Mile Sweepstakes^{A}	Indianapolis Motor Speedway	Speedway, Indiana	Paved	(United States) Pat Flaherty	(United States) Pat Flaherty
2	June 10	(United States) Rex Mays Classic	Wisconsin State Fair Park Speedway	West Allis, Wisconsin	Paved	(United States) Johnny Boyd	(United States) Pat Flaherty
3	June 24	(United States) Langhorne 100	Langhorne Speedway	Langhorne, Pennsylvania	Dirt	(United States) Billy Garrett	(United States) George Amick
4	July 4	(United States) Pee Dee 200	Darlington Raceway	Darlington, South Carolina	Paved	(United States) Andy Linden	(United States) Pat O'Connor
NC	July 4	(United States) Pikes Peak Auto Hill Climb	Pikes Peak Highway	Pikes Peak, Colorado	Hill	(United States) Slim Roberts^{B}	(United States) Bobby Unser
5	July 14	(United States) Atlanta 100	Lakewood Speedway	Atlanta, Georgia	Dirt	(United States) Bob Veith	(United States) Eddie Sachs
NC	July 22	(United States) Indianapolis Sweepstakes	Williams Grove Speedway	Mechanicsburg, Pennsylvania	Dirt	(United States) Ed Elisian	(United States) Jimmy Bryan
NC	August 12	(United States) Dayton 25	Dayton Speedway	Dayton, Ohio	Paved	(United States) Pat O'Connor	(United States) Ed Elisian
6	August 19	(United States) Springfield 100	Illinois State Fairgrounds	Springfield, Illinois	Dirt	(United States) Rex Easton	(United States) Jimmy Bryan
7	August 26	(United States) Milwaukee 250	Wisconsin State Fair Park Speedway	West Allis, Wisconsin	Paved	(United States) Johnny Boyd	(United States) Jimmy Bryan
8	September 3	(United States) Ted Horn Memorial 100	DuQuoin State Fairgrounds	Du Quoin, Illinois	Dirt	(United States) Johnny Thomson	(United States) Jimmy Bryan
9	September 8	(United States) Syracuse 100	Syracuse Mile	Syracuse, New York	Dirt	(United States) Earl Motter	(United States) Tony Bettenhausen
10	September 15	(United States) Hoosier Hundred	Indiana State Fairgrounds	Indianapolis, Indiana	Dirt	(United States) Jud Larson	(United States) Jimmy Bryan
11	October 21	(United States) Golden State 100	California State Fairgrounds	Sacramento, California	Dirt	(United States) Jud Larson	(United States) Jud Larson
12	November 12	(United States) Bobby Ball Memorial	Arizona State Fairgrounds	Phoenix, Arizona	Dirt	(United States) George Amick	(United States) George Amick

Paved/Dirt Oval
Road Course/Hill Climb
Non-championship race

^A Indianapolis 500 was USAC-sanctioned and counted towards the 1956 FIA World Championship of Drivers title.
^B No pole is awarded for the Pikes Peak Hill Climb, in this schedule on the pole is the driver who started first. No lap led was awarded for the Pikes Peak Hill Climb, however, a lap was awarded to the drivers that completed the climb.

== Final points standings ==
Pos	Driver	INDY (United States)	MIL1 (United States)	LHS (United States)	DAR (United States)	LAK (United States)	SPR (United States)	MIL2 (United States)	DQSF (United States)	SYR (United States)	ISF (United States)	CSF (United States)	ASF (United States)	Pts
1	(United States) Jimmy Bryan	19	4	6	8		1	1	1	2	1	3	2	1860
2	(United States) Pat Flaherty	**1**	1	14	5	5	18							1500
3	(United States) Don Freeland	3	6	7	10		2	24	17	11	9	2	13	1280
4	(United States) George Amick	DNP	DNQ	1	4	13	DNQ	6	5	5	12	13	**1**	1050
5	(United States) Jimmy Reece	9	7	9	12	7		2	9	DNQ	DNQ	6	3	1040
6	(United States) Johnny Boyd	30	**5**		3		7	**5**	11	4	11	8	6	980
7	(United States) Bob Veith	7	10	10	DNS	**6**	15	8	4	17	7	4	8	903
8	(United States) Rodger Ward	8	DNP	DNS	19	16	6	3	DNQ	10	3	16	19	862
9	(United States) Sam Hanks	2												800
10	(United States) Johnny Thomson	32	2	18	9	3	10	14	**2**	3	16	DNP		710
11	(United States) Pat O'Connor	18	11	DNQ	1	17	5	21	DNQ	13	2	15	DNQ	680
12	(United States) Eddie Sachs	DNQ			21	1	3	4	DNQ	12	DNQ		DNQ	650
13	(United States) Johnnie Parsons	4	17					11	DNQ	DNP		DNQ		650
14	(United States) Al Keller	14	9	3	DNS	2	4	12		16	5			585
15	(United States) Bob Sweikert	6	3											540
16	(United States) Dick Rathmann	5	21	15	15		DNQ	25		DNQ	DNQ	9	DNQ	540
17	(United States) Jack Turner	25	13	11	2	20	17	7	12	DNQ	DNQ	DNQ		500
18	(United States) Ed Elisian	23	DNQ	4	6	18	DNQ	22	13	6	DNQ	7	16	420
19	(United States) Gene Hartley	11	8	2	22	11		16	DNQ	DNP	6			410
20	(United States) Elmer George		18	8	7	19	DNQ	20	6	18	14	5	7	410
21	(United States) Andy Linden	27	DNQ	12	**13**	8	8	23	7	9	8	11	4	400
22	(United States) Jud Larson RY										**4**	**1**	DNQ	320
23	(United States) Jim Rathmann	20	19		11	4	DNQ	15	3	DNQ	15			300
24	(United States) Tony Bettenhausen	22					DNS	DNS	8	1	18	14	9	290
25	(United States) Johnnie Tolan	21	DNQ					10	DNQ			10	5	205
26	(United States) Earl Motter	DNQ			17	9	DNQ	9	14	**7**	13			200
27	(United States) Cliff Griffith	10	DNQ					13						150
28	(United States) Mike Magill	DNQ		5			DNQ				10			130
29	(United States) Billy Garrett R	16	14	**13**	23	10	12	17	DNQ	8	DNQ	DNQ		90
30	(United States) Jim McWithey R	DNQ	DNQ	16		15	9	DNQ	DNQ		DNQ	DNQ	11	60
31	(United States) Don Branson R						11	26	10	15	DNQ			50
32	(United States) Fred Agabashian	12												50
33	(United States) Art Bisch R											17	10	30
34	(United States) Bill Cheesbourg R	DNQ		DNQ	14		16	DNQ	DNQ	DNQ	DNQ	12	14	10
35	(United States) Keith Andrews	26	12											10
36	(United States) Dempsey Wilson R	DNQ										DNQ	12	10
37	(United States) Bob Carpenter R					12								10
-	(United States) Rex Easton		15				**13**		DNQ					0
-	(United States) Bob Christie R	13												0
-	(United States) Jimmy Daywalt	24					DNQ		15	14	DNQ			0
-	(United States) Eddie Russo	DNS		17	18	14				DNQ				0
-	(United States) Roy Graham R						14			DNQ				0
-	(United States) Eddie Johnson	15	DNQ											0
-	(United States) Mel McGaughy											DNQ	15	0
-	(United States) Shorty Templeman	DNQ	16					19	DNQ					0
-	(United States) Ken Gottschalk R		DNQ	DNQ	16		DNQ			DNP	DNQ			0
-	(United States) Charles Musselman			DNQ					16	DNQ				0
-	(United States) Tommy Hinnershitz									DNQ	17		17	0
-	(United States) Duke Dinsmore	17			DNQ			18		DNP				0
-	(United States) Van Johnson R								DNQ	DNQ	DNP		18	0
-	(United States) Jimmy Davies	DNQ							18		DNQ			0
-	(United States) Len Sutton	DNQ										18		0
-	(United States) Troy Ruttman	31	20		DNS									0
-	(United States) Gene Force				20									0
-	(United States) Danny Kladis		22											0
-	(United States) Al Herman	28	DNQ	DNQ						DNS				0
-	(United States) Ray Crawford	29									DNQ	DNQ	DNQ	0
-	(United States) Paul Russo	33												0
–	(United States) Chuck Weyant	DNQ					DNQ	DNQ			DNQ			0
-	(United States) Johnny Kay	DNQ	DNQ						DNQ					0
-	(United States) Leroy Warriner	DNQ						DNQ			DNQ			0
-	(United States) Marvin Pifer	DNQ									DNQ			0
-	(United States) Bud Randall						DNQ						DNQ	0
-	(United States) Jay Abney	DNQ												0
-	(United States) Johnny Baldwin	DNQ												0
-	(United States) Tony Bonadies	DNQ												0
-	(United States) Buddy Cagle	DNQ												0
-	(United States) Len Duncan	DNQ												0
-	(United States) Edgar Elder	DNQ												0
-	(Italy) Giuseppe Farina	DNQ												0
-	(United States) Ernie McCoy	DNQ												0
-	(United States) Roy Newman	DNQ												0
-	(United States) Cal Niday	DNQ												0
-	(United States) Dickie Reese	DNQ												0
-	(United States) Gig Stephens	DNQ												0
-	(United States) Marshall Teague	DNQ												0
-	(United States) Dick Fraizer			DNQ										0
-	(United States) Paul Howe						DNQ							0
-	(United States) Chuck Rodee								DNQ					0
-	(United States) Speed McFee									DNQ				0
-	(United States) Roger McCluskey											DNQ		0
Pos	Driver	INDY (United States)	MIL1 (United States)	LHS (United States)	DAR (United States)	LAK (United States)	SPR (United States)	MIL2 (United States)	DQSF (United States)	SYR (United States)	ISF (United States)	CSF (United States)	ASF (United States)	Pts

Color	Result
Gold	Winner
Silver	2nd place
Bronze	3rd place
Green	4th & 5th place
Light Blue	6th-10th place
Dark Blue	Finished (Outside Top 10)
Purple	Did not finish (Ret)
Red	Did not qualify (DNQ)
Brown	Withdrawn (Wth)
Black	Disqualified (DSQ)
White	Did not start (DNS)
Blank	Did not participate (DNP)
Blank	Not competing

**In-line notation**
**Bold**	Pole position
Italics	Ran fastest race lap
*	Led most race laps
RY Rookie of the Year
R Rookie

== General references ==
- Åberg, Andreas. "USAC National Championship 1956". Driver Database. Archived from the original on September 8, 2012.
- "1956 USAC National Championship Trail". ChampCarStats.com. Archived from the original on October 10, 2008.
- Harms, Phil. "1956 Championship Driver Summary" (PDF). Motorsport.com. Archived from the original (PDF) on August 10, 2012.
- http://media.indycar.com/pdf/2011/IICS_2011_Historical_Record_Book_INT6.pdf (p. 282-283)

== See also ==
- 1956 Indianapolis 500
- 1956 USAC Stock Car Series
