= Kupiec =

Kupiec (Polish for merchant) is a surname. Notable people with the surname include:

- Aniela Kupiec (1920–2019), Polish poet
- Ewa Kupiec (born 1964), Polish pianist
- Magdalena Kupiec (born 1976), Polish swimmer

Other meanings:

- Kupiec (video game), a 1993 Polish video game
