= Johnnie Tolan =

American racing driver (1917–1986)

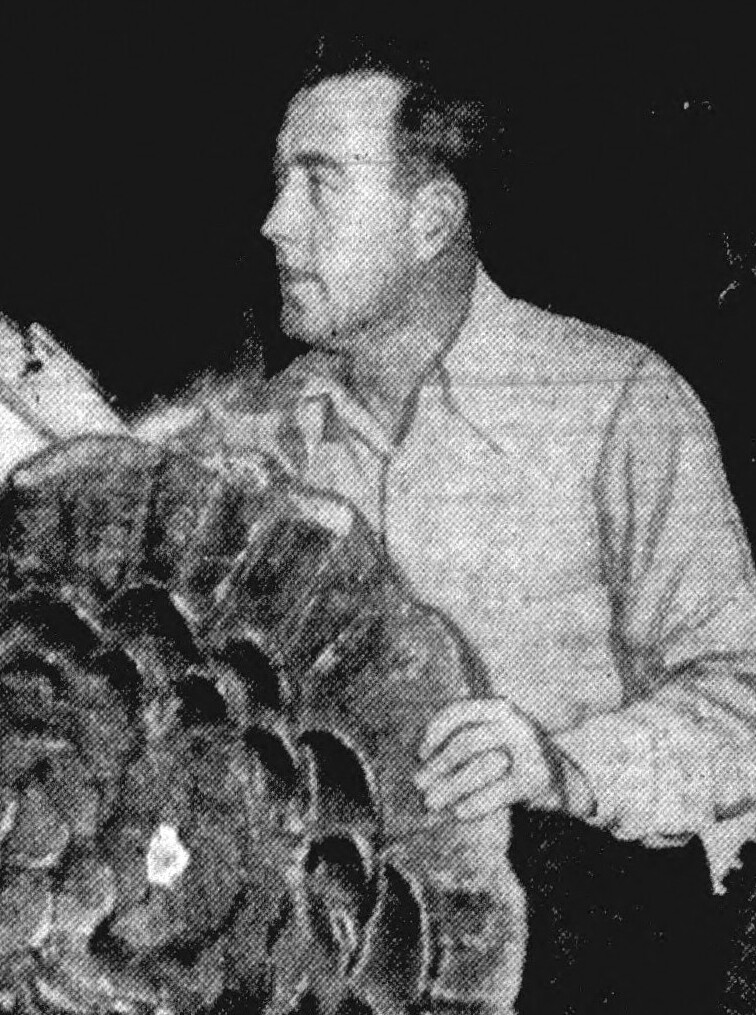
- Tolan in 1950
- Born: October 22, 1917; Victor, Colorado, U.S.
- Died: June 6, 1986 (aged 68); Redondo Beach, California, U.S.

Formula One World Championship career
- Nationality: (United States) American
- Active years: 1951, 1953–1954, 1956–1959
- Team(s): Kuzma, Kurtis Kraft, Lesovsky
- Entries: 7 (3 starts)
- Championships: 0
- Wins: 0
- Podiums: 0
- Career points: 0
- Pole positions: 0
- Fastest laps: 0
- First entry: 1951 Indianapolis 500
- Last entry: 1959 Indianapolis 500

Johnnie Tolan (October 22, 1917 – June 6, 1986 in Redondo Beach, California) was an American racecar driver.

== Racing career ==
Tolan won 45 midget car races in 1946, and won the Rocky Mountain Midget Racing Association championship. Tolan repeated his championship in 1947, and scored 47 wins. He had 27 feature wins in 1948.

Tolan captured the 1950 AAA Midwest championship. He captured his first National Midget championship in 1952, as well as the Midwest championship. He won the 1953 Night Before the 500 midget car race.

Tolan competed at the Indianapolis 500 in 1956, 1957, and 1958. His best finish was thirteenth in 1958.

Tolan traveled with Bob Tattersall and Jimmy Davies to Australia in 1964. Tolan suffered career ending back injuries at the Sydney Showgrounds.

Tolan had a ritual at each midget racing event. He would smoke a cigarette during warmups. He would flip the cigarette toward the starting line on his first high speed lap. He believed that he would have a successful night if he hit the mark.

== Career award ==
- Tolan was inducted in the National Midget Auto Racing Hall of Fame in 1988.

== Indy 500 results ==
| Year | Car | Start | Qual | Rank | Finish | Laps | Led | Retired |
|---|---|---|---|---|---|---|---|---|
| 1956 | 34 | 31 | 140.061 | 31 | 21 | 173 | 0 | Flagged |
| 1957 | 28 | 31 | 139.884 | 30 | 20 | 138 | 0 | Clutch |
| 1958 | 19 | 30 | 142.309 | 31 | 13 | 200 | 0 | Running |
| Totals | | | | | | 511 | 0 | |

| Starts | 3 |
| Poles | 0 |
| Front Row | 0 |
| Wins | 0 |
| Top 5 | 0 |
| Top 10 | 0 |
| Retired | 1 |

== World Championship career summary ==
The Indianapolis 500 was included in the FIA World Championship from 1950 to 1960. Drivers racing at Indy during that period earned World Championship points and participation recognition. Tolan competed in three World Championship races but did not score any World Championship points.
