= Pat Flaherty (racing driver) =

American racing driver (1926–2002)

- Born: George Francis Flaherty; January 6, 1926 Glendale, California, U.S.
- Died: April 9, 2002 (aged 76) Oxnard, California, U.S.

Championship titles
- Major victories Indianapolis 500 (1956)

Champ Car career
- 18 races run over 9 years
- Best finish: 2nd (1956)
- First race: 1950 Indianapolis 500 (Indianapolis)
- Last race: 1963 Rex Mays Classic (Milwaukee)
- First win: 1955 Milwaukee 250 (Milwaukee)
- Last win: 1956 Rex Mays Classic (Milwaukee)
Wins	Podiums	Poles
3	4	1

NASCAR Cup Series career
- 1 race run over 1 year
- First race: 1951 Motor City 250 (Detroit)
Wins	Top tens	Poles
0	0	0

Formula One World Championship career
- Active years: 1950, 1953 – 1956, 1959
- Team(s): Kurtis Kraft, Watson
- Entries: 7 (5 starts)
- Championships: 0
- Wins: 1
- Podiums: 1
- Career points: 8
- Pole positions: 1
- Fastest laps: 0
- First entry: 1950 Indianapolis 500
- First win: 1956 Indianapolis 500
- Last entry: 1959 Indianapolis 500

George Francis "Pat" Flaherty (January 6, 1926 – April 9, 2002) was an American racing driver who won the Indianapolis 500 in 1956.

== Driving career ==
=== Early career ===
Flaherty began racing track roadsters in 1946, and in 1948 relocated to the Midwest to compete in Andy Granatelli's Hurricane Hot Rod Association.

=== Championship car career ===
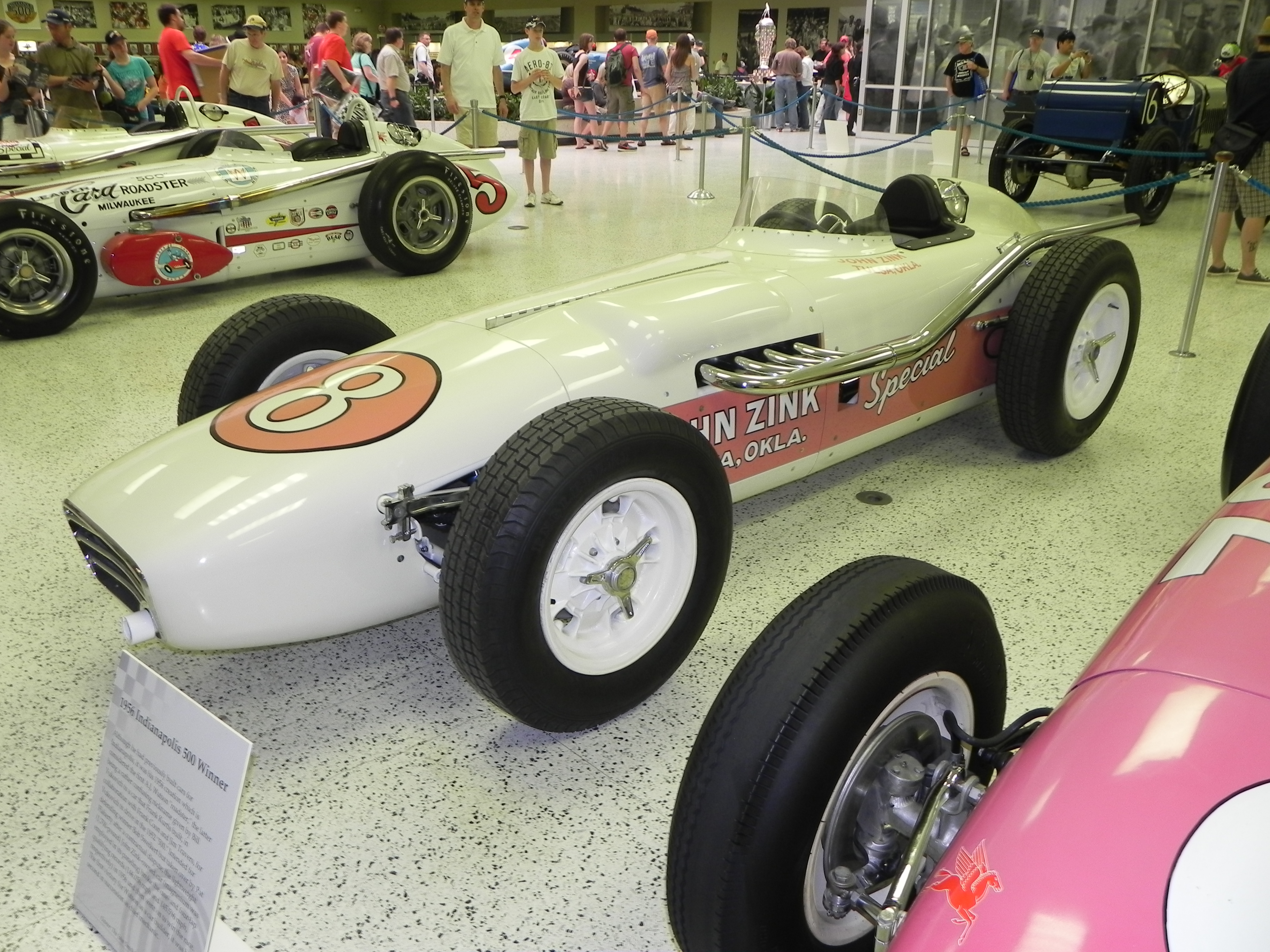
Flaherty's winning car from the 1956 Indianapolis 500

Flaherty drove in the AAA and USAC Championship Car series, racing in the 1950, 1953–1956, 1958–1959, and 1963 seasons with 19 starts, including the Indianapolis 500 races in 1950, 1953, 1955, 1956, and 1959. He finished in the top-ten nine times, with victories in 1955 and 1956 at Milwaukee as well as the 1956 Indianapolis 500. Born in Glendale, California, Flaherty died in Oxnard, California.

=== World Drivers' Championship career ===
The AAA/USAC-sanctioned Indianapolis 500 was included in the FIA World Drivers' Championship from 1950 through 1960. Drivers competing at Indianapolis during those years were credited with World Drivers' Championship points and participation in addition to those which they received towards the AAA/USAC National Championship.

Flaherty participated in five World Drivers' Championship races at Indianapolis. He started on the pole once, won once, and accumulated eight World Drivers' Championship points.

== Injury and later life ==
After winning the 1956 Indianapolis 500, Flaherty was severely injured in a race car crash less than three months later, which prevented him from racing at the 1957 500. Flaherty successfully raced pigeons for over twenty years after he retired from auto racing. He also built and publicised a portable go-kart track where he would race against all-comers.

== Awards and honors ==
Flaherty has been inducted into the following halls of fame:

- Auto Racing Hall of Fame (2006)

== Motorsports career results ==
=== AAA/USAC Championship Car results ===
Year	1	2	3	4	5	6	7	8	9	10	11	12	13	14	Pos	Points
1949	ARL	INDY; DNQ	MIL	TRE	SPR	MIL	DUQ	PIK	SYR	DET	SPR	LAN	SAC	DMR	-	0
1950	INDY; 10	MIL	LAN	SPR	MIL	PIK	SYR	DET	SPR	SAC	PHX	BAY	DAR		33rd	103.5
1953	INDY; 22	MIL	SPR	DET	SPR	MIL	DUQ	PIK	SYR	ISF	SAC	PHX			-	0
1954	INDY; DNS	MIL	LAN	DAR	SPR	MIL; 12	DUQ; DNQ	PIK	SYR	ISF; DNQ	SAC	PHX	LVG		51st	20
1955	INDY; 10	MIL; 3	LAN	SPR	MIL; 1	DUQ	PIK	SYR	ISF; DNQ	SAC	PHX				8th	790
1956	INDY; 1	MIL; 1	LAN; 14	DAR; 5	ATL; 5	SPR; 18	MIL	DUQ	SYR	ISF	SAC	PHX			2nd	1,500
1958	TRE	INDY; DNQ	MIL	LAN	ATL	SPR	MIL; 16	DUQ	SYR	ISF	TRE	SAC	PHX		-	0
1959	DAY; 9	TRE; 17	INDY; 19	MIL; 19	LAN	SPR	MIL	DUQ	SYR	ISF	TRE	SAC	PHX		43rd	40
1963	TRE	INDY	MIL; 21	LAN	TRE; DNQ	SPR	MIL	DUQ	ISF	TRE; DNQ	SAC	PHX			-	0

=== Indianapolis 500 results ===
Year	Car	Start	Qual	Rank	Finish	Laps	Led	Retired
1950	59	11	129.608	30	10	135	0	Running
1953	77	24	135.668	27	22	115	0	Crash NC
1954	38	-	-	-	Ret*	110	0	Crash
1955	89	12	140.149	8	10	200	0	Running
1956	8	1	145.596	1	1st	200	127	Running
1959	64	18	142.399	21	19	162	11	Crash FS
Totals						812	138	

Starts	5
Poles	1
Front Row	1
Wins	1
Top 5	1
Top 10	3
Retired	2

* Shared drive with Jim Rathmann

Preceded by Bob Sweikert	Indianapolis 500 Winner; 1956	Succeeded by Sam Hanks
