= Jimmy Bryan =

American racing driver (1926–1960)

- Born: James Ernest Bryan; January 28, 1926 Phoenix, Arizona, U.S.
- Died: June 19, 1960 (aged 34) Langhorne, Pennsylvania, U.S.

Championship titles
- AAA / USAC Championship Car (1954, 1956, 1957); Major victories Race of Two Worlds (1957); Indianapolis 500 (1958)

Champ Car career
- 62 races run over 10 years
- Best finish: 1st (1954, 1956, 1957)
- First race: 1952 Indianapolis 500 (Indianapolis)
- Last race: 1960 Langhorne 100 (Langhorne)
- First win: 1953 Golden State 100 (Sacramento)
- Last win: 1958 Indianapolis 500 (Indianapolis)
Wins	Podiums	Poles
19	32	3

Formula One World Championship career
- Active years: 1951 – 1960
- Team(s): Lesovsky, Kurtis Kraft, Schroeder, Kuzma, Salih
- Entries: 10 (9 starts)
- Championships: 0
- Wins: 1
- Podiums: 3
- Career points: 18
- Pole positions: 0
- Fastest laps: 0
- First entry: 1951 Indianapolis 500
- First win: 1958 Indianapolis 500
- Last entry: 1960 Indianapolis 500

James Ernest Bryan (January 28, 1926 – June 19, 1960) was an American racing driver. Well-known for his habit of racing with an unlit cigar, Bryan was a three-time National Champion, and won the Indianapolis 500 in 1958. In Europe he is well-known for winning the 1957 Race of Two Worlds.

== Early life ==
Bryan was born on January 28, 1926, in Phoenix, Arizona, to Reginald Louis, a baker, and Pauline (née Wainwright).

== Driving career ==
=== Championship car career ===
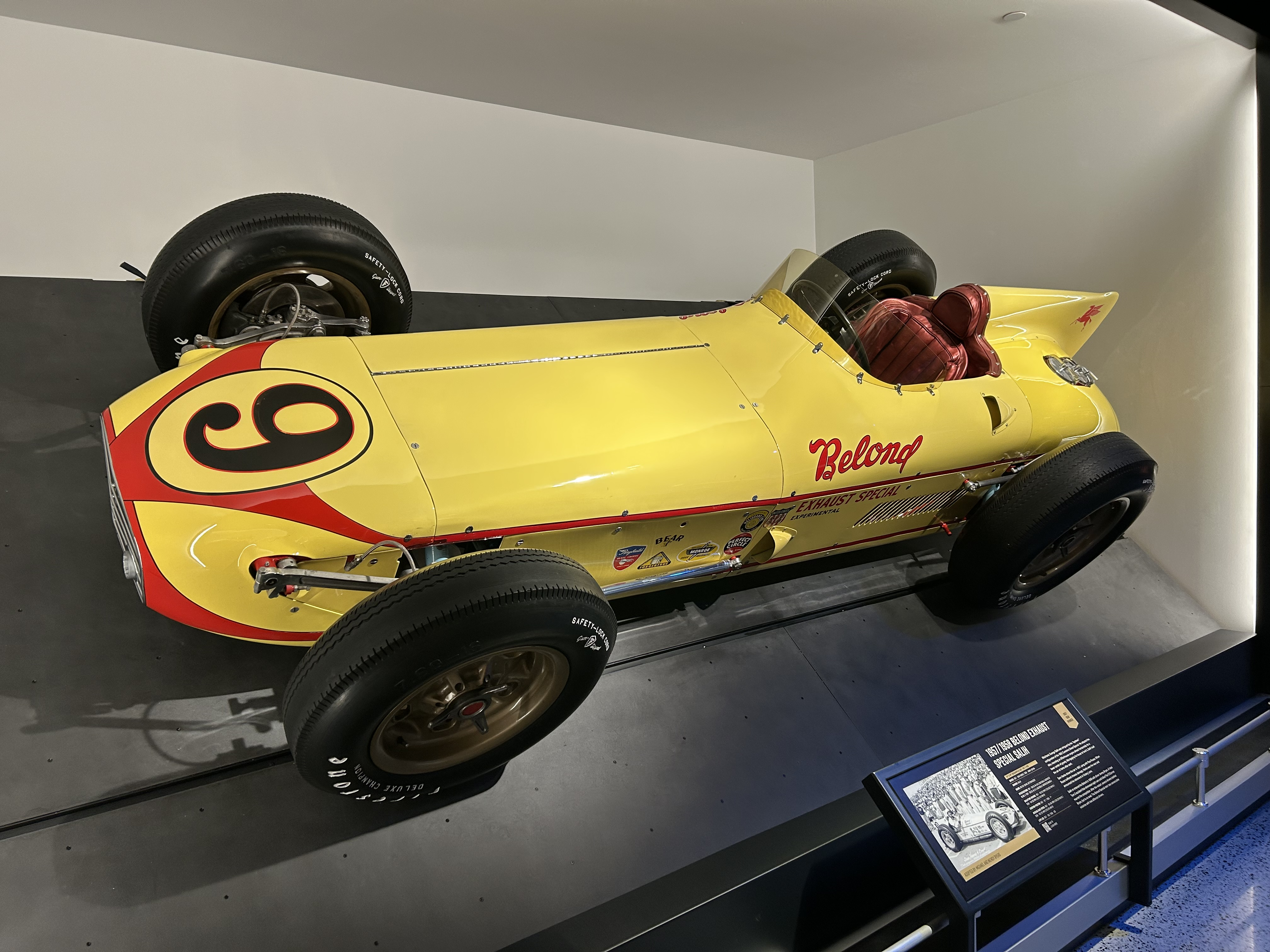
Bryan's winning car from the 1958 Indianapolis 500 - later repainted to look as it did when Sam Hanks drove the vehicle to victory in the 1957 event

Bryan drove in the AAA and USAC Championship Car series, racing in the 1952–1960 seasons with 72 starts, including each year's Indianapolis 500 race. He finished in the top ten 54 times, with 23 victories.

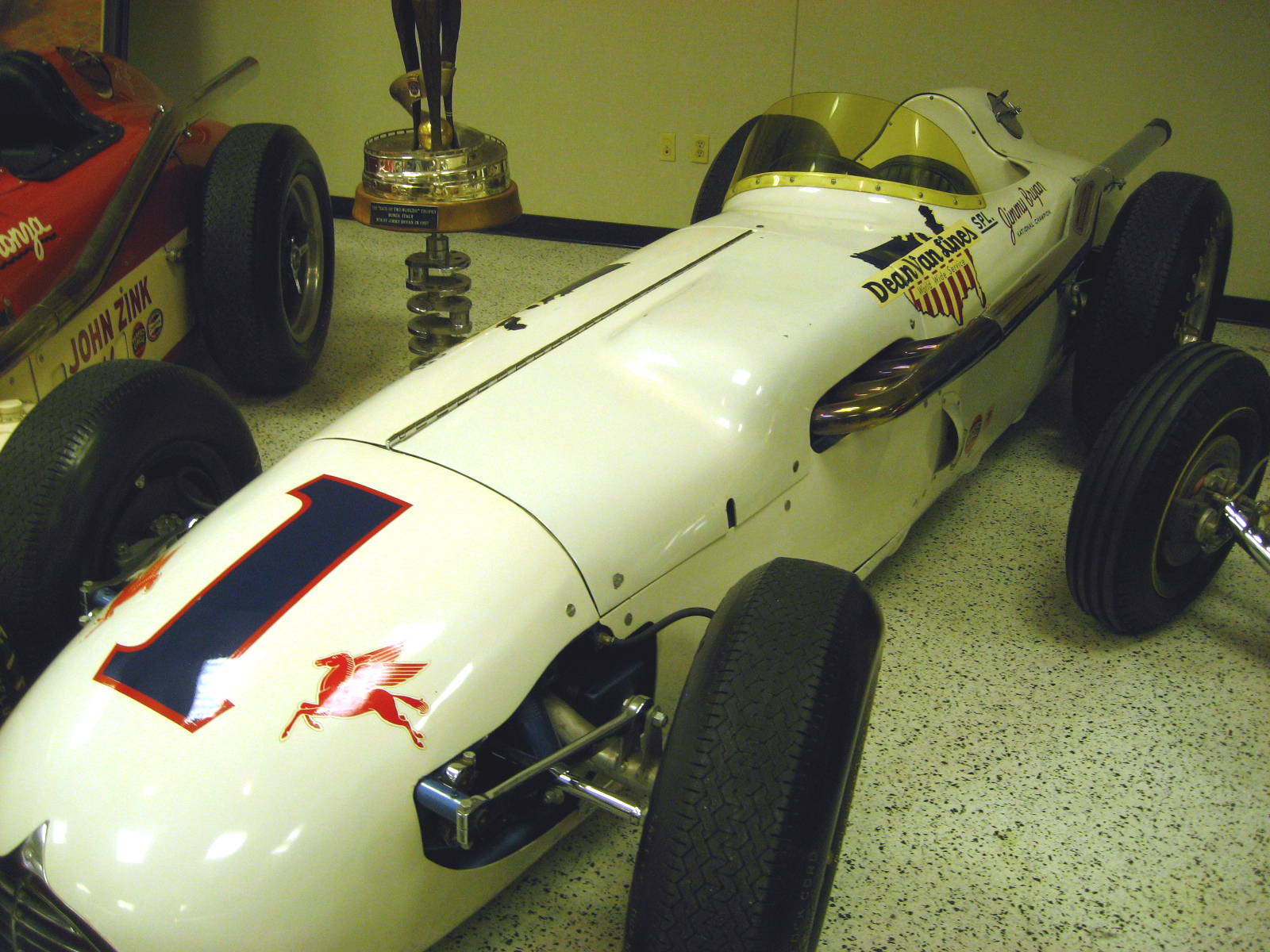
Jimmy Bryan's Kuzma-Offenhauser, known as the Dean Van Lines Special

Bryan won the 1958 Indianapolis 500 and the 1954 AAA and 1956 and 1957 USAC National Championship. During his 1957 championship season, Bryan also won the inaugural running of the Race of Two Worlds at Autodromo Nazionale Monza, Italy.

=== World Drivers' Championship career ===
The AAA/USAC-sanctioned Indianapolis 500 was included in the FIA World Drivers' Championship from 1950 through 1960. Drivers competing at Indianapolis during those years were credited with World Drivers' Championship points and participation in addition to those which they received towards the AAA/USAC National Championship.

Bryan participated in nine World Drivers' Championship races at Indianapolis. He won once, finished in the top three three times, and accumulated 18 World Drivers' Championship points.

== Death and legacy ==
The trophy awarded to Jimmy Bryan for winning the Race of Two Worlds in 1957

Bryan died after a crash in a Championship car race at Langhorne Speedway in 1960, on the same day that two drivers were killed in the Belgian Grand Prix, making the day one of the most tragic in racing history. For many years, one of the two Championship races at the Phoenix International Raceway was traditionally called the Jimmy Bryan Memorial. He was also memorialized in a song by Harry Weger titled "The Ballad of Jimmy Bryan". Bryan is buried in Phoenix's Greenwood/Memory Lawn Mortuary & Cemetery.

== Awards and honors ==
Bryan has been inducted into the following halls of fame:

- Arizona Sports Hall of Fame (1964)
- Auto Racing Hall of Fame (1973)
- National Sprint Car Hall of Fame (1994)
- Motorsports Hall of Fame of America (1999)
- International Motorsports Hall of Fame (2001)
- National Midget Auto Racing Hall of Fame

== Motorsports career results ==
=== AAA/USAC Championship Car results ===
AAA National Championship
Year	1	2	3	4	5	6	7	8	9	10	11	12	13	14	15	Pos	Points
1951	INDY; DNQ	MIL	LAN	DAR	SPR	MIL	DUQ	DUQ	PIK	SYR	DET	DNC	SJS	PHX	BAY	-	0
1952	INDY; 6	MIL	RAL	SPR; DNQ	MIL	DET	DUQ	PIK	SYR	DNC	SJS; 9	PHX; 14				15th	440
1953	INDY; 14	MIL; 2	SPR; 8	DET; 3	SPR; 15	MIL; 10	DUQ; 7	PIK	SYR; 17	ISF; 11	SAC; 1	PHX; 15				9th	621.4
1954	INDY; 2	MIL; DNS	LAN; 1	DAR; 3	SPR; 12	MIL; 3	DUQ; 3	PIK	SYR; 4	ISF; 1	SAC; 1	PHX; 1	LVG; 1			1st	2,630
1955	INDY; 24	MIL; 4	LAN; 1	SPR; 1	MIL; 23	DUQ; 1	PIK	SYR; 2	ISF; 1	SAC; 1	PHX; 1					2nd	1,480
USAC National Championship Trail
1956	INDY; 19	MIL; 4	LAN; 6	DAR; 8	ATL	SPR; 1	MIL; 1	DUQ; 1	SYR; 2	ISF; 1	SAC; 3	PHX; 2				1st	1,860
1957	INDY; 3	LAN; DNQ	MIL; 19	DET; 1	ATL; 13	SPR; 7	MIL; 22	DUQ; 18	SYR; 4	ISF; 2	TRE; 8	SAC; 2	PHX; 1			1st	1,650
1958	TRE	INDY; 1	MIL	LAN	ATL	SPR	MIL	DUQ	SYR	ISF	TRE	SAC	PHX			6th	1,000
1959	DAY	TRE	INDY; 33	MIL	LAN	SPR	MIL	DUQ	SYR	ISF	TRE	SAC	PHX			-	0
1960	TRE	INDY; 19	MIL; DNQ	LAN; 18	SPR	MIL	DUQ	SYR	ISF	TRE	SAC	PHX				-	0

=== Indianapolis 500 results ===
Year	Car	Start	Qual	Rank	Finish	Laps	Led	Retired
1952	77	21	134.142	27	6	200	0	Running
1953	8	31	135.506	29	14	183	0	Flagged
1954	9	3	139.665	4	2nd	200	46	Running
1955	1	11	140.160	7	24	90	31	Fuel Pump
1956	2	19	143.741	9	19	185	0	Flagged
1957	1	15	141.188	17	3rd	200	0	Running
1958	1	7	144.185	8	1st	200	139	Running
1959	6	20	142.118	24	33	1	0	Clutch
1960	10	10	144.532	13	19	152	0	Fuel Pump
Totals						1411	216	

Starts	9
Poles	0
Front Row	1
Wins	1
Top 5	3
Top 10	4
Retired	3

=== FIA World Drivers' Championship results ===
(key)

Year	Entrant	Chassis	Engine	1	2	3	4	5	6	7	8	9	10	11	WDC	Points
1951	Viking Trailer	Lesovsky	Offenhauser L4	SUI	500; DNQ	BEL	FRA	GBR	GER	ITA	ESP				NC	0
1952	Peter Schmidt	Kurtis Kraft 3000	Offenhauser L4	SUI	500; 6	BEL	FRA	GBR	GER	NED	ITA				NC	0
1953	Blakely Oil	Schroeder	Offenhauser L4	ARG	500; 14	NED	BEL	FRA	GBR	GER	SUI	ITA			NC	0
1954	Dean Van Lines	Kuzma Indy Roadster	Offenhauser L4	ARG	500; 2	BEL	FRA	GBR	GER	SUI	ITA	ESP			10th	6
1955	Dean Van Lines	Kuzma Indy Roadster	Offenhauser L4	ARG	MON	500; 24	BEL	NED	GBR	ITA					NC	0
1956	Dean Van Lines	Kuzma Indy Roadster	Offenhauser L4	ARG	MON	500; 19	BEL	FRA	GBR	GER	ITA				NC	0
1957	Dean Van Lines	Kuzma Indy Roadster	Offenhauser L4	ARG	MON	500; 3	FRA	GBR	GER	PES	ITA				16th	4
1958	Belond AP / George Salih	Salih Indy Roadster	Offenhauser L4	ARG	MON	NED	500; 1	BEL	FRA	GBR	GER	POR	ITA	MOR	13th	8
1959	Belond AP / George Salih	Salih Indy Roadster	Offenhauser L4	MON	500; 33	NED	FRA	GBR	GER	POR	ITA	USA			NC	0
1960	Metal-Cal	Salih Indy Roadster	Offenhauser L4	ARG	MON	500; 19	NED	BEL	FRA	GBR	POR	ITA	USA		NC	0

Preceded by Sam Hanks	Indianapolis 500 Winner; 1958	Succeeded by Rodger Ward
