= 1957 Indianapolis 500 =

American motor race

41st Indianapolis 500
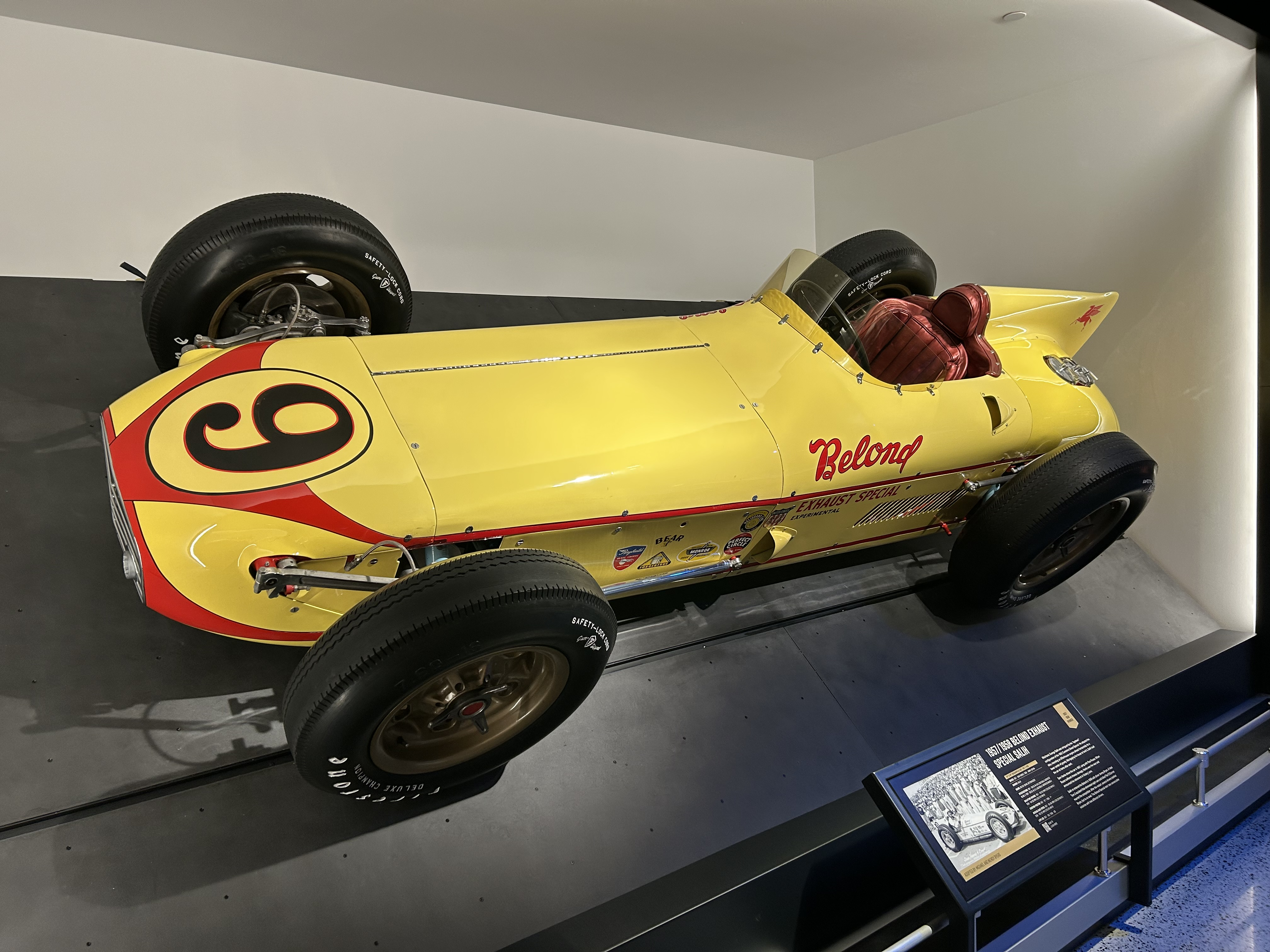

Indianapolis Motor Speedway

Indianapolis 500
- Sanctioning body: USAC
- Date: May 30, 1957
- Winner: Sam Hanks
- Winning Entrant: George Salih
- Winning Chief Mechanic: George Salih & Howard Gilbert
- Winning time: 3:41:14.25
- Average speed: 135.601 mph (218.229 km/h)
- Pole position: Pat O'Connor
- Pole speed: 143.948 mph (231.662 km/h)
- Most laps led: Sam Hanks (136)

Pre-race
- Pace car: Mercury Turnpike Cruiser
- Pace car driver: F. C. Reith
- Starter: Bill Vanderwater
- Honorary referee: Louis H. Schwitzer
- Estimated attendance: 170,000

Chronology
Previous	Next
1956	1958

The 41st International 500-Mile Sweepstakes was held at the Indianapolis Motor Speedway on Thursday, May 30, 1957. The event was part of the 1957 USAC National Championship Trail and it was the third race of the eight-race 1957 World Championship of Drivers.

Sam Hanks won the Indianapolis 500 in his thirteenth attempt, the most such by any 500 winner. (Note: The 1941 Indianapolis 500 is included as a race competed by Hanks in the thirteen, but in that race, he had gotten into an accident one day before the race. It was decided to list him as a "DNS" in 33rd place. As such, 1957 was his 12th Indy 500 where he took laps; only Tony Kanaan, who won in 2013 in his 12th Indy 500 race, has matched Hanks.) He retired from competition at Indy in victory lane. Contrary to popular belief, Hanks did not completely retire from racing until the end of the year. He skipped the Race of Two Worlds when his entrant withdrew, but competed in USAC Stock Car events later in the year, winning the event at Trenton, and finished third in points championships for 1957.

Hanks received a record $103,844 purse, the first driver to win a $100,000 single-race payday. The total race purse was also a record, over $300,000 for the first time.

Hanks won the race in George Salih's "Lay-down Offy". The Offenhauser engine was mounted on its side and shifted off-center. This was done in order to lower the center of gravity, reduce frontal area, and counterbalance the body roll in the turns. The car that Hanks drove for the win in 1957 would win back-to-back Indy 500s, with Jimmy Bryan piloting the very same chassis to victory again in 1958.

== Track improvements ==
For 1957, the Speedway introduced a new state-of-the-art pit lane and brand new Master Control Tower to house broadcasting as well as timing and scoring. For the first time, the pit area was separated from the mainstretch by an inside wall. The pit lane was paved in concrete (the mainstretch remained brick), while a grass strip went the length of the pit road to accommodate pit crew sign board men. Flagging duties would be done from a station on the grass strip at the start/finish line, and eventually a small wooden platform would be constructed for the flagman to stand atop. USAC officials also stationed themselves on the new grass parapet (which would be removed after the 1993 race when the parapet was narrowed and paved with concrete, and pit road become asphalt except for the pit boxes).

For the 1957 race, the field lined up in the pit area single-file, rather than the traditional eleven rows of three on the racing surface. On the pace lap, the field assembled into position, and was aligned for the green flag. By 1957, the field was now being taken around for two warm-up laps (one "parade" lap, and one "pace" lap), an increase over the single lap used previously. This single-file grid practice would eventually lead to confusion, and was utilized for only two years.

== Practice and time trials ==
Time trials was scheduled for four days, but the second day was rained out. Rain affected practice days as well.

Giuseppe Farina was the only European driver on the entry list for the race, however, he did not attempt to qualify. Farina had difficulty getting his car up to speed, and had experienced handling problems. On May 15, his teammate Keith Andrews stepped into his car for a test run, but crashed. Down the frontstretch, Andrews began to slide, and when he attempted to correct, the car backed into the inside wall separating the pit area. Andrews was crushed to death between the cowl and the fuel tank, but no fire broke out. Farina withdrew after Andrews was killed, with no backup car to use.

=== Saturday May 18 – Pole Day time trials ===
Pat O'Connor qualified for the pole position. Showers delayed qualifying for nearly four hours, and at other points during the afternoon. A total of only nine cars completed runs.

O'Connor's speed of 143.948 mph was not a track record. Troy Ruttman was on the track, and after a lap of over 144 mph, rain forced him to abort the attempt. He was able to get back out to the track, but had to settle for a speed of only 142.772 mph.

The first rookie to make the field was Elmer George, the husband of Mari Hulman George, and son-in-law of Speedway president Tony Hulman.

=== Sunday May 19 – Second day time trials ===
The second day scheduled for qualifying was rained out.

=== Saturday May 25 – Third day time trials ===
Paul Russo (144.817 mph) was the fastest driver of the day, in one of the Novi Specials. Russo was the fastest qualifier in the field, as his speed was faster than the pole position time from the previous weekend.

=== Sunday May 26 – Fourth day time trials ===
Rain and winds plagued the final day of time trials. Twenty three cars entered the day looking to fill the final 11 positions. A total of 43 attempts were made, with 9 cars bumped.

Tony Bettenhausen (142.439 mph) was the fastest driver of the day, driving one of the 500 hp Novi Specials. Bill Cheesbourg needed two cars to make the field. His first attempt was too slow. But late in the day, he got in Cliff Griffith's car, and at a speed of 141.565 mph, bumped Johnnie Parsons from the lineup.

== Qualifying results ==
=== Grid ===
Row	Inside			Middle			Outside		
1	12	(United States)	Pat O'Connor; Sumar Special; Chapman Root; Kurtis 500G, Offenhauser; 143.948 mph (231.662 km/h)	88	(United States)	Eddie Sachs R Peter Schmidt Special; Peter Schmidt; Kuzma, Offenhauser; 143.872 mph (231.540 km/h)	52	(United States)	Troy Ruttman W John Zink Special; John Zink; Watson, Offenhauser; 142.772 mph (229.769 km/h)
2	14	(United States)	Fred Agabashian; Bowes Seal Fast Special; George Bignotti; Kurtis 500G, Offenhauser; 142.557 mph (229.423 km/h)	6	(United States)	Johnny Boyd; Bowes Seal Fast Special; George Bignotti; Kurtis 500G, Offenhauser; 142.102 mph (228.691 km/h)	5	(United States)	Jimmy Reece; Hoyt Machine Special; Fred Sommer; Kurtis 500C, Offenhauser; 142.006 mph (228.537 km/h)
3	83	(United States)	Ed Elisian; McNamara Special; Lee Elkins; Kurtis 500C, Offenhauser; 141.777 mph (228.168 km/h)	16	(United States)	Al Keller; Bardahl/Clancy Special; Pat Clancy; Kurtis 500G, Offenhauser; 141.398 mph (227.558 km/h)	23	(United States)	Elmer George R Travelon Trailer Special; Ernest Ruiz; Kurtis 500B, Offenhauser; 140.729 mph (226.481 km/h)
4	54	(United States)	Paul Russo; Novi Auto Air Conditioner Special; Novi Racing Corp; Kurtis 500F, Novi SC; 144.817 mph (233.060 km/h)	10	(United States)	Johnny Thomson; D-A Lubricant Special; Racing Associates; Kuzma, Offenhauser; 143.529 mph (230.988 km/h)	73	(United States)	Andy Linden; McNamara/Veedol Special; Lee Elkins; Kurtis 500G, Offenhauser; 143.244 mph (230.529 km/h)
5	9	(United States)	Sam Hanks; Belond Exhaust Special; George Salih; Salih, Offenhauser; 142.812 mph (229.834 km/h)	22	(United States)	Gene Hartley; Massaglia Hotels Special; Hart Fullerton; Lesovsky, Offenhauser; 141.271 mph (227.354 km/h)	1	(United States)	Jimmy Bryan; Dean Van Lines Special; Al Dean; Kuzma R, Offenhauser; 141.188 mph (227.220 km/h)
6	7	(United States)	Bob Veith; Bob Estes Special; Bob Estes; Phillips, Offenhauser; 141.016 mph (226.943 km/h)	18	(United States)	Johnnie Parsons W Sumar Special; Chapman Root; Kurtis 500G, Offenhauser; 140.784 mph (226.570 km/h)	77	(United States)	Mike Magill R Dayton Steel Foundry Special; George Walther; Kurtis 500G, Offenhauser; 140.411 mph (225.970 km/h)
7	19	(United States)	Jack Turner; Bardahl Special; Pat Clancy; Kurtis 500G, Offenhauser; 140.367 mph (225.899 km/h)	43	(United States)	Eddie Johnson; Chapman Special; Harry Allen Chapman; Kurtis 500G, Offenhauser; 140.171 mph (225.583 km/h)	3	(United States)	Don Freeland; Ansted Rotary; Ansted-Thompson Racing; Kurtis 500D, Offenhauser; 139.649 mph (224.743 km/h)
8	27	(United States)	Tony Bettenhausen; Novi Auto Air Conditioner Special; Novi Racing Corp. Kurtis 500F, Novi SC; 142.439 mph (229.233 km/h)	31	(United States)	Bill Cheesbourg R Schildmeier Seal Line Special; J.S. Donaldson; Kurtis 500G, Offenhauser; 141.565 mph (227.827 km/h)	8	(United States)	Rodger Ward; Wolcott Fuel Injection Special; Roger Wolcott; Lesovsky, Offenhauser SC; 141.321 mph (227.434 km/h)
9	82	(United States)	Chuck Weyant; Central Excavating Special; Pete Salemi; Kurtis 500C, Offenhauser; 141.105 mph (227.086 km/h)	55	(United States)	Eddie Russo; Sclavi & Amos Special; Fred Sclavi; Kurtis 500C, Offenhauser; 140.862 mph (226.695 km/h)	92	(United States)	Don Edmunds R McKay Special; Roy McKay; Kurtis 500G, Offenhauser; 140.449 mph (226.031 km/h)
10	48	(United States)	Marshall Teague; Sumar Special; Chapman Root; Kurtis 500C, Offenhauser; 140.329 mph (225.838 km/h)	57	(United States)	Jimmy Daywalt; Helse Special; H.H. Johnson; Kurtis 500C, Offenhauser; 140.203 mph (225.635 km/h)	89	(United States)	Al Herman; Dunn Engineering Special; Harry Dunn; Dunn, Offenhauser; 140.007 mph (225.319 km/h)
11	28	(United States)	Johnnie Tolan; Greenman-Casale Special; Lysle Greenman; Kuzma, Offenhauser; 139.884 mph (225.121 km/h)	26	(United States)	Jim Rathmann; Chiropractic Special; Lindsey Hopkins; Epperly, Offenhauser; 139.806 mph (224.996 km/h)	95	(United States)	Bob Christie; Jones & Maley Special; Jones & Maley; Kurtis 500C, Offenhauser; 139.779 mph (224.952 km/h)

=== First alternate ===
#33 - Billy Garrett
Federal Engineering Special
Kurtis 500E, Offenhauser

=== Failed to qualify ===
#4 - George Amick R Federal Engineering Special; Snowberger, Offenhauser; Too slow	#62 - Keith Andrews; Farina Special; Kurtis 500G, Offenhauser; Fatal accident	#82 - Johnny Baldwin R Central Excavating Special; Kurtis 500C, Offenhauser; Did not qualify
#45 - Bill Cheesbourg; Las Vegas Club Special; Kurtis 500G, Offenhauser; Too slow, Qualified #31	#15 - Tony Bonadies R Ray Brady Special; Kurtis 500C, Offenhauser; Practice accident	#81 - Tony Bonadies R Central Excavating Special; Kuzma D, Offenhauser; Too slow
#59 - Bud Clemons R Chiropractic Special; Shilala Offenhauser; Too slow	#49 - Ray Crawford; Meguiar Mirror Glaze Special; Kurtis 500G, Offenhauser; Too slow	#32 - Jimmy Davies; Anderson Special; Kurtis 500D, Offenhauser; Too slow
#62 - Giuseppe Farina R Farina Special; Kurtis 500G, Offenhauser; Crashed by K. Andrews	#71 - Johnny Fedricks R Gdula Special; Kurtis 500C, Offenhauser; Did not qualify	#64 - Gene Force; Shannon Brothers Special; Watts, Offenhauser; Too slow
#58 - Andy Furci R Ray Brady Special; Schroder D, Offenhauser; Did not qualify	#31 - Cliff Griffith; Seal Line Special; Kurtis 500G, Offenhauser; Did not qualify	#43 - Van Johnson R Chapman Special; Kurtis 500G, Offenhauser; Did not qualify
#72 - Danny Kladis; Morgan Engineering Special; Maserati, Maserati SC; Too slow	#84 - Danny Kladis; Safety Auto Glass Special; Mercedes, Jaguar; Too slow	#25 - Jud Larson R John Zink Special; Watson, Offenhauser; Too slow
#34 - Jim McWithey R Federal Engineering Special; Kurtis 500D, Offenhauser; Qualifying accident	#32 - Cal Niday; Trio Brass Foundry Special; Kurtis 500D, Offenhauser; Did not qualify	#98 - Johnnie Parsons W Agajanian Special; Kuzma, Offenhauser; Too slow
#92 - Leroy Warriner R McKay Special; Kurtis 500G, Offenhauser; Did not qualify	#42 - Dempsey Wilson R Martin Special; Curtis, Offenhauser; Too slow	

R = Indianapolis 500 rookie
W = Former Indianapolis 500 winner

== Race summary ==
=== First half ===
On the backstretch during the pace lap, Elmer George hit the back of Eddie Russo's car, putting both cars out of the race before the start. Only 31 cars took the green flag.

Polesitter Pat O'Connor took the lead at the start and led the first four laps. Troy Ruttman led laps 5–6. O'Connor re-took the lead for laps 7–9, but Ruttman led laps 10–11, until blowing the engine. Paul Russo took the lead on lap 12, and in the first twelve laps there had already been four lead changes between three drivers.

=== Second half ===
Sam Hanks took the lead for the final time on lap 135.

== Box score ==
Finish	Grid	No.	Driver	Chassis	Engine	Laps	Status	Points	
Finish	Grid	No.	Driver	Chassis	Engine	Laps	Status	USAC	WDC
1	13	9	(United States) Sam Hanks	Salih	Offenhauser	200	135.601 mph	1000	8
2	32	26	(United States) Jim Rathmann	Epperly	Offenhauser	200	+21.46	800	7^{1}
3	15	1	(United States) Jimmy Bryan	Kuzma R	Offenhauser	200	+2:13.97	700	4
4	10	54	(United States) Paul Russo	Kurtis 500F	Novi SC	200	+2:56.86	600	3
5	12	73	(United States) Andy Linden	Kurtis 500G	Offenhauser	200	+3:14.27	500	2
6	5	6	(United States) Johnny Boyd	Kurtis 500G	Offenhauser	200	+4:35.27	400	
7	28	48	(United States) Marshall Teague	Kurtis 500C	Offenhauser	200	+4:45.58	300	
8	1	12	(United States) Pat O'Connor	Kurtis 500G	Offenhauser	200	+5:33.15	250	
9	16	7	(United States) Bob Veith	Phillips	Offenhauser	200	+6:17.11	200	
10	14	22	(United States) Gene Hartley	Lesovsky	Offenhauser	200	+7:10.12	150	
11	19	19	(United States) Jack Turner	Kurtis 500G	Offenhauser	200	+7:56.07	100	
12	11	10	(United States) Johnny Thomson	Kuzma	Offenhauser	199	-1 Lap	50	
13	33	95	(United States) Bob Christie	Kurtis 500C	Offenhauser	197	-3 Laps		
14	25	82	(United States) Chuck Weyant	Kurtis 500C	Offenhauser	196	-4 Laps		
15	22	27	(United States) Tony Bettenhausen	Kurtis 500F	Novi SC	195	-5 Laps		
16	17	18	(United States) Johnnie Parsons W	Kurtis 500G	Offenhauser	195	-5 Laps		
17	21	3	(United States) Don Freeland	Kurtis 500D	Offenhauser	192	-8 Laps		
18	6	5	(United States) Jimmy Reece	Kurtis 500C	Offenhauser	182	Throttle		
19	27	92	(United States) Don Edmunds R	Kurtis 500G	Offenhauser	170	Spun Off		
20	31	28	(United States) Johnnie Tolan	Kuzma	Offenhauser	138	Clutch		
21	30	89	(United States) Al Herman	Dunn	Offenhauser	111	Accident		
22	4	14	(United States) Fred Agabashian	Kurtis 500G	Offenhauser	107	Fuel Leak		
23	2	88	(United States) Eddie Sachs R	Kuzma	Offenhauser	105	Fuel Leak		
24	18	77	(United States) Mike Magill R	Kurtis 500G	Offenhauser	101	Accident		
25	20	43	(United States) Eddie Johnson	Kurtis 500G	Offenhauser	93	Wheel Bearing		
26	23	31	(United States) Bill Cheesbourg R	Kurtis 500G	Offenhauser	81	Fuel Leak		
27	8	16	(United States) Al Keller	Kurtis 500G	Offenhauser	75	Accident		
28	29	57	(United States) Jimmy Daywalt	Kurtis 500C	Offenhauser	53	Accident		
29	7	83	(United States) Ed Elisian	Kurtis 500C	Offenhauser	51	Timing gear		
30	24	8	(United States) Rodger Ward	Lesovsky	Offenhauser SC	27	Supercharger		
31	3	52	(United States) Troy Ruttman W	Watson	Offenhauser	13	Oil leak		
32	26	55	(United States) Eddie Russo	Kurtis 500C	Offenhauser	0	Accident		
33	9	23	(United States) Elmer George R	Kurtis 500B	Offenhauser	0	Accident		

W Former Indianapolis 500 winner

R Indianapolis 500 Rookie

All entrants utilized Firestone tires.

^1 – Includes 1 point for fastest lead lap.

=== Race statistics ===
Lap Leaders
Laps	Leader
1–4	Pat O'Connor
5–6	Troy Ruttman
7–9	Pat O'Connor
10–11	Troy Ruttman
12–35	Paul Russo
36–48	Sam Hanks
49–53	Johnny Thomson
54–110	Sam Hanks
111–134	Jim Rathmann
135–200	Sam Hanks

Total laps led
Driver	Laps
Sam Hanks	136
Jim Rathmann	24
Paul Russo	24
Pat O'Connor	7
Johnny Thomson	5
Troy Ruttman	4

Yellow Lights: 31 minutes, 41 seconds
Laps*	Reason
54–66	Jimmy Daywalt crash in turn 3 (12:45)
76–80	Al Keller crash in turn 1 (5:35)
110–119	Al Herman, Mike Magill crash in turn 4 (10:45)
170–171	Don Edmunds spin in turn 3 (2:35)
* – Approximate lap counts

=== Race notes ===
- Fastest Lead Lap: Jim Rathmann – 1:02.75
- Sam Hanks was the only driver in the field using the British made Lodge Spark Plugs. The other 32 drivers all had the American Champion brand installed.
- Dick Rathmann qualified, but was mugged the night before the race. He was replaced in the car by Johnnie Parsons.
- First Indianapolis 500 starts for Eddie Sachs, Mike Magill, Bill Cheesbourg, and Elmer George.
- Only Indianapolis 500 start for Don Edmunds.
- Last Indianapolis 500 starts for Sam Hanks, Andy Linden, Marshall Teague, and Fred Agabashian.

== Broadcasting ==
=== Radio ===
The race was carried live on the IMS Radio Network. Sid Collins served as chief announcer. The broadcast was carried by 302 affiliates, including Latin America. It reached 46 states and DC. The broadcast came on-air at 10:45 a.m. local time, fifteen minutes prior to the start of the race. For the fifth years, the network featured announcers from the five major radio stations in Indianapolis (WISH, WIRE, WIBC, WFBM, and WISH). For 1957, the crew was expanded to eleven, with three new remote reporting locations. For the first time, there would be a reporter in each of the four turns, and a third pit reporter was added to help cover the recently lengthened pit lane. In addition, the booth announcers moved into the newly constructed Master Control Tower along the frontstretch.

Charlie Brockman conducted the winner's interview in victory lane.

Indianapolis Motor Speedway Radio Network
Booth Announcers	Turn Reporters	Pit reporters
Chief Announcer: Sid Collins; Driver Expert/garages: Floyd Davis; Statistician: Charlie Brockman	Turn 1: Bill Frosch; Turn 2: Bob Rhodes; Backstretch: Bernie Herman; Turn 3: Robin Bright; Turn 4: Jim Shelton	Luke Walton; Greg Smith; Gordon Graham; Charlie Brockman (victory lane)

== World Drivers' Championship ==
1957 Indianapolis 500
Race 3 of 8 in the 1957 Formula One season
← Previous race	Next race →

Race details
- Date: May 30, 1957
- Location: Indianapolis Motor Speedway; Speedway, Indiana
- Course: Permanent racing facility
- Course length: 4.023 km (2.500 miles)
- Distance: 200 laps, 804.672 km (500.000 miles)

=== Background ===
The Indianapolis 500 was included in the FIA World Championship of Drivers from 1950 through 1960. The race was sanctioned by AAA through 1955, and then by USAC beginning in 1956. At the time the new world championship was announced and first organized by the CSI, the United States did not yet have a Grand Prix. Indianapolis Motor Speedway vice president and general manager Theodore E. "Pop" Meyers lobbied that the Indianapolis 500 be selected as the race to represent the country and to pay points towards the world championship.

Drivers competing at the Indianapolis 500 in 1950 through 1960 were credited with participation in and earned points towards the World Championship of Drivers. However, the machines competing at Indianapolis were not necessarily run to Formula One specifications and regulations. The drivers also earned separate points (on a different scale) towards the respective AAA or USAC national championships. No points, however, were awarded by the FIA towards the World Constructors' Championship.

=== Summary ===
The 1957 Indianapolis 500 was round 3 of 8 on the 1957 World Championship. The event, however, failed to attract interest from any of the regular competitors on the Grand Prix circuit. For the second year in a row, former World Champion Giuseppe Farina entered, but again struggled to get his car up to speed. He eventually withdrew after his teammate Keith Andrews was killed in a crash testing the car. Race winner Sam Hanks earned 8 points towards the World Championship. Despite not competing in any of the other World Championship events, Hanks finished eighth in the final season standings.

==== World Drivers' Championship standings after the race ====
	Pos	Driver	Points
	1	(Argentina) Juan Manuel Fangio	17
28	2	(United States) Sam Hanks	8
27	3	(United States) Jim Rathmann	7
2	4	(France) Jean Behra	6
2	5	(United Kingdom) Tony Brooks	6

- Note: Only the top five positions are included.

==== USAC National Championship Trail standings after the race ====
Rank	Driver	Points
1	Sam Hanks	1000
2	Jim Rathmann	800
3	Jimmy Bryan	700
4	Paul Russo	600
5	Andy Linden	500

- Note: Only the top five positions are included.

== Gallery ==
1957 pace car

== Notes ==
Previous race: 1957 Monaco Grand Prix	FIA Formula One World Championship; 1957 season	Next race: 1957 French Grand Prix
Previous race: 1956 Indianapolis 500; Pat Flaherty	1957 Indianapolis 500; Sam Hanks	Next race: 1958 Indianapolis 500; Jimmy Bryan
Preceded by 130.840 mph (1954 Indianapolis 500)	Record for the Indianapolis 500 fastest average speed 135.601 mph	Succeeded by 135.875 mph (1959 Indianapolis 500)
