= 1963 Tony Bettenhausen 200 =

Race details
- 7th round of the 1963 USAC Championship Car season
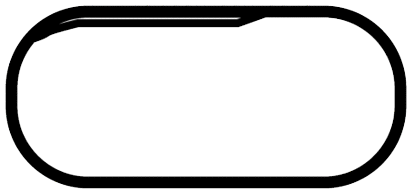
- Date: August 18, 1963
- Official name: 17th Tony Bettenhausen 200
- Location: The Milwaukee Mile; West Allis, Wisconsin
- Course: Permanent racing facility 1 mi / 1.609 km
- Distance: 200 laps 200 mi / 321.8 km
- Weather: Temperatures reaching up to 73 °F (23 °C); wind speeds approaching 22 mph (35 km/h)

Pole position
- Driver: (United Kingdom) Jim Clark (Team Lotus)
- Time: 32.93 (109.323 mph / 175.902 km/h)

Podium
- First: (United Kingdom) Jim Clark (Team Lotus)
- Second: (United States) A. J. Foyt (Sheraton-Thompson)
- Third: (United States) Dan Gurney (Team Lotus)

The 1963 Tony Bettenhausen 200 was the seventh round of the 1963 USAC Championship Car season, held on August 18, 1963, at the 1-mile (1.6 km) Milwaukee Mile, in West Allis, Wisconsin.

The race was the first American Championship Car race won by a rear-engined car. Jim Clark and Team Lotus had finished second at the 1963 Indianapolis 500 after a controversy surrounding the lack of a black flag for winner Parnelli Jones, whose car was leaking oil. Colin Chapman and Team Lotus decided to return to Champ Car competition at Milwaukee and Trenton later in the year. The rear-engined Lotuses dominated practice and qualifying, breaking the track record by over a second. In the race, Clark led all 200 laps and lapped the entire field, save for second place A. J. Foyt. Clark's teammate Dan Gurney finished third, battling a misfire.

Although a rear-engined car would not win the Indianapolis 500 until 1965, the win signaled a shift in Champ Car design. The last win for a front-engined roadster on a paved track was the opening round of the 1965 season at Phoenix, barely a year and a half after Clark's Milwaukee victory.

== Qualifying ==
Clark, Gurney, Foyt, and Jones broke the previous qualifying record set in 1961 by Don Branson at 34.09 sec (105.62 mph / 169.94 km/h).

== Race result ==
Pos	No.	Driver	Team/Sponsor	Car	Laps	Time/Retired	Grid	Laps Led	Points
1	92	(United Kingdom) Jim Clark	Lotus Powered by Ford	Lotus-Ford	200	1:54:53.098	1	200	400
2	2	(United States) A. J. Foyt	Sheraton-Thompson	Trevis-Offenhauser	200	Finished	3	0	320
3	93	(United States) Dan Gurney	Lotus Powered by Ford	Lotus-Ford	199	+ 1 Lap	2	0	280
4	1	(United States) Rodger Ward	Kaiser Aluminum	Watson-Offenhauser	199	+ 1 Lap	14	0	240
5	10	(United States) Chuck Hulse	Dean Van Lines	Ewing-Offenhauser	197	+ 3 Laps	6	0	200
6	14	(United States) Roger McCluskey	Konstant Hot	Watson-Offenhauser	197	+ 3 Laps	15	0	160
7	46	(United States) Johnny Rutherford	Racing Associates	Turner-Chevrolet	196	+ 3 Laps	9	0	120
8	38	(United States) Jim Hurtubise	Konstant Hot	Philipp-Offenhauser	195	+ 5 Laps	13	0	100
9	29	(United States) Bobby Grim	Vita Fresh Orange Juice	Kuzma-Offenhauser	195	+ 5 Laps	16	0	80
10	4	(United States) Don Branson	Leader Card 500	Watson-Offenhauser	194	+ 6 Laps	11	0	60
11	8	(United States) Jim McElreath	Jim Forbes Racing	Watson-Offenhauser	194	+ 6 Laps	23	0	40
12	20	(United States) Len Sutton	Leader Card 500	Watson-Offenhauser	193	+ 7 Laps	20	0	20
13	86	(United States) Bob Veith	Racing Associates	Porter-Offenhauser	193	+ 7 Laps	8	0	
14	27	(United States) Troy Ruttman	Dayton Steel Wheel	Watson-Offenhauser	190	+ 10 Laps	17	0	
15	61	(United States) Bob Mathouser	Federal Engineering	Kurtis-Offenhauser	189	+ 11 Laps	24	0	
16	26	(United States) Bob Wente	Morcroft	Trevis-Offenhauser	187	+ 13 Laps	21	0	
17	89	(United States) Jack Conely	J & E Engineering	Dunn-Offenhauser	174	+ 26 Laps	26	0	
18	81	(United States) Bud Tingelstad	Gabriel Shocker	Kuzma-Offenhauser	160	Magneto	20	0	
19	21	(United States) Johnny White	Pfrommer Trucking	Meskowski-Offenhauser	157	Blown engine	10	0	
20	53	(United States) Chuck Rodee	Spirit of St. Louis	Watson-Offenhauser	67	Oil line	25	0	
21	37	(Canada) Ed Kostenuk	City of Victoria	Kurtis-Offenhauser	64	Water hose	18	0	
22	5	(United States) Bobby Marshman	Econo Car Rental	Epperly-Offenhauser	56	Differential	12	0	
23	98	(United States) Parnelli Jones	Agajanian/Willard Battery	Watson-Offenhauser	42	Brakes	4	0	
24	9	(United States) Eddie Sachs	Bryant Heating & Cooling	Watson-Offenhauser	37	Overheating	22	0	
25	45	(United States) Al Miller	Bardahl	Watson-Offenhauser	27	Wrecked	7	0	
26	35	(United States) Lloyd Ruby	Gabriel Shocker	Trevis-Offenhauser	11	Engine	5	0	
DNS	33	(United States) Ralph Liguori	Concannon	Kurtis-Offenhauser	-	DNS	-	0	
DNS	95	(United States) Bob MacLean	Mitchell Gallas	Kurtis-Offenhauser	-	DNS	-	0	
DNS	66	(United States) Mickey Shaw	Lil-Beanie	Meskowski-Chevrolet	-	DNS	-	0	

== Standings after the race ==
National Championship standings

Pos	Driver	Points
1	(United States) A. J. Foyt	2000
2	(United States) Rodger Ward	1450
3	(United States) Parnelli Jones	1330
4	(United Kingdom) Jim Clark	1200
5	(United States) Jim McElreath	975

- Note: Only the top five positions are included.
