= George Salih =

American auto racing builder (1914–1984)

- Born: George Frank Salih; May 12, 1914; San Francisco, California, U.S.
- Died: February 8, 1984 (aged 69); Los Angeles, California, U.S.
- Occupation: Auto racing builder

George Frank Salih (May 12, 1914 – February 8, 1984) was an American auto racing designer and crew chief, winning three Indianapolis 500s. As a crew chief he saw victory in 1951 with Lee Wallard, in 1957 with Sam Hanks, and in 1958 with Jimmy Bryan. Salih's 1957 and 1958 victories were won using an innovative chassis of his own design.

== Designer of the Salih "lie down" chassis ==
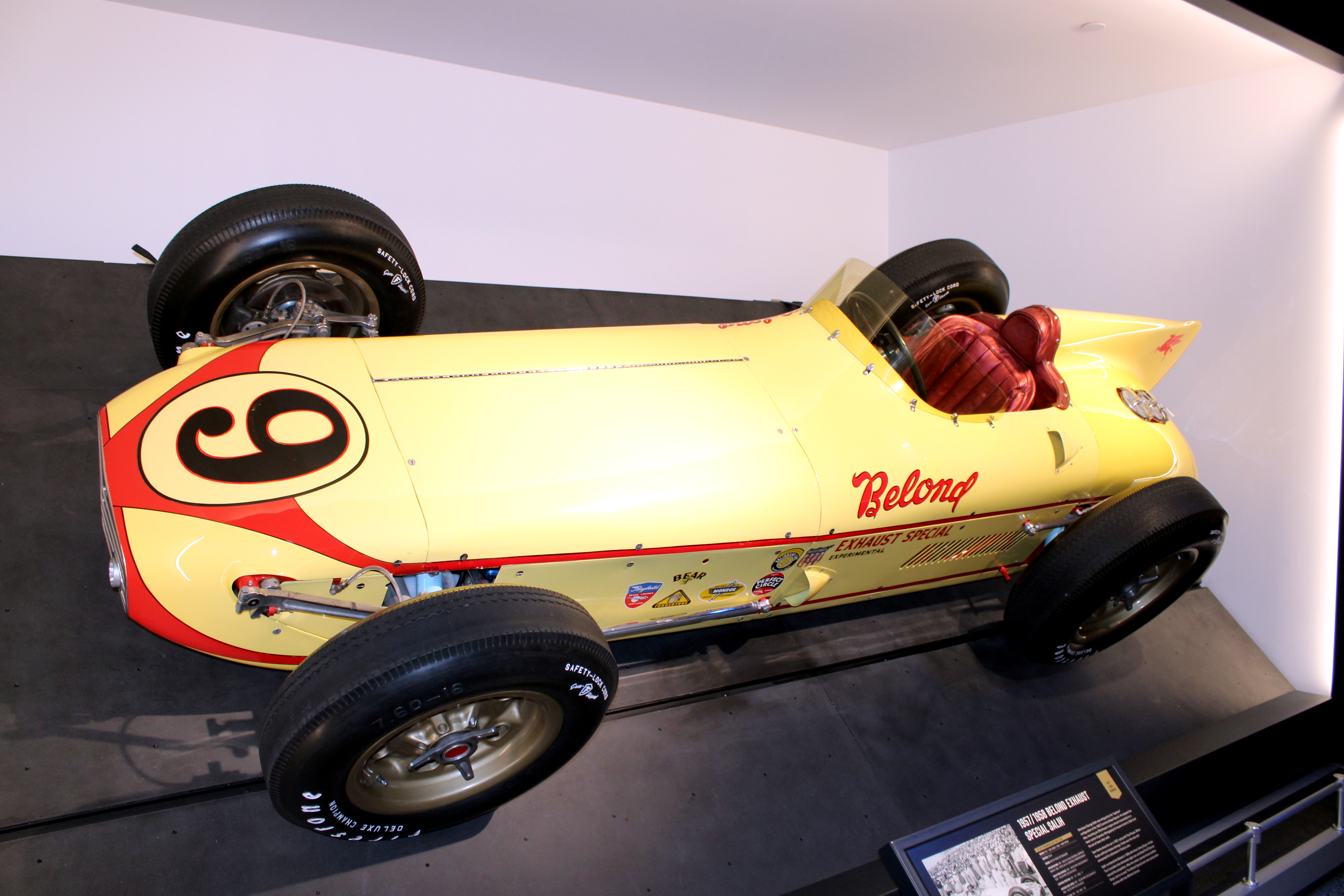
Salih's innovative design won the 1957 and 1958 Indianapolis 500s

During 1956 and early 1957, Salih developed an innovative design allowing the traditional Offenhauser used in Indy car racing to "lie down." The lay-down design offered a lower center of gravity, and enabled Salih's design to sustain higher cornering speeds around the Indianapolis Motor Speedway. Unable to interest any team owners with his unusual design, Salih eventually decided to finance the construction of the car himself, placing him and his family into a vulnerable financial position.

Salih's design was constructed with assistance from builder Quin Epperly. Epperly agreed to fabricate the body and fuel tanks for Salih's chassis at a reduced cost. In return, Epperly would be allowed to construct and sell similar lay-down chassis of modified design, known as Epperly lay-downs. Salih convinced veteran driver Sam Hanks, 1953 AAA National Champion, to drive the car at Indianapolis. Salih entered the car, hoping to sell it before the race. When no interest was forthcoming, Salih was forced to bear the full cost of ownership, placing him close to bankruptcy.

During the race, Hanks steadily moved through the field; taking the lead after the first quarter of race, he led most of the rest of the way. After winning the race, Hanks promptly retired from open-wheel competition. Salih's winnings as the owner saved him from bankruptcy, and enabled him to finance the car for 1958. That year of the race saw several other entries of a lay-down design. Jimmy Bryan drove Salih's car to a repeat victory.

After a poor finish in the 1959 race, Salih had a new chassis constructed for the 1960 Indianapolis 500. While the new chassis included several modifications to his original design, it achieved only modest success at the speedway.

== Select Indianapolis 500 results ==
Season	Driver	Grid	Classification	Note	Race Report
1957	Sam Hanks	13	1		Report
1958	Jimmy Bryan	7	1		Report
1959	Jimmy Bryan	20	33	Engine	Report
1960	Jimmy Bryan	10	19	Fuel system	Report
1961	Chuck Stevenson	28	6		Report
1962	Johnny Boyd	28	10		Report
1963	Johnny Boyd	27	32	Oil leak	Report
