= 1960 USAC Championship Car season =

Sports season

- USAC National Championship Trail

Season
- Races: 12
- Start date: April 10
- End date: November 20

Awards
- National champion: (United States) A. J. Foyt
- Indianapolis 500 winner: (United States) Jim Rathmann

The 1960 USAC Championship Car season consisted of 12 races, beginning in Trenton, New Jersey on April 10 and concluding in Phoenix, Arizona on November 20. There were also two non-championship events at Langhorne, Pennsylvania, and Pikes Peak, Colorado. This was the final year that the Indianapolis 500 was a part of the Formula One World Championship. The USAC National Champion was A. J. Foyt and the Indianapolis 500 winner was Jim Rathmann. Foyt also scored the first four victories of his career, which was four out of the final six races of the season which helped catapult him to his first series championship. Three time USAC/AAA National Champion (1954, 1956, 1957), and 1958 Indianapolis 500 winner Jimmy Bryan, was killed in a first lap accident during the Langhorne 100 at Langhorne Speedway driving Rodger Ward's car as he refused to drive in that race; he was 34 years old.

== Schedule and results ==
Rnd	Date	Race name	Track	Location	Type	Pole position	Winning driver
1	April 10	(United States) Trenton 100	Trenton International Speedway	Trenton, New Jersey	Paved	(United States) Johnny Thomson	(United States) Rodger Ward
NC	April 13	(United States) Langhorne 100	Langhorne Speedway	Langhorne, Pennsylvania	Dirt	(United States) Don Branson	(United States) Don Branson
2	May 30	(United States) International 500 Mile Sweepstakes^{A}	Indianapolis Motor Speedway	Speedway, Indiana	Paved	(United States) Eddie Sachs	(United States) Jim Rathmann
3	June 5	(United States) Rex Mays Classic	Milwaukee Mile	West Allis, Wisconsin	Paved	(United States) Lloyd Ruby	(United States) Rodger Ward
4	June 19	(United States) Langhorne 100	Langhorne Speedway	Langhorne, Pennsylvania	Dirt	(United States) Don Branson	(United States) Jim Hurtubise
NC	July 4	(United States) Pikes Peak Auto Hill Climb	Pikes Peak Highway	Pikes Peak, Colorado	Hill	(United States) Al Unser^{B}	(United States) Bobby Unser
5	August 20	(United States) Springfield 100	Illinois State Fairgrounds	Springfield, Illinois	Dirt	(United States) Don Branson	(United States) Jim Packard
6	August 28	(United States) Milwaukee 200	Milwaukee Mile	West Allis, Wisconsin	Paved	(United States) Rodger Ward	(United States) Len Sutton
7	September 5	(United States) Ted Horn Memorial	DuQuoin State Fairgrounds	Du Quoin, Illinois	Dirt	(United States) Don Branson	(United States) A. J. Foyt
8	September 10	(United States) Syracuse 100	Syracuse Mile	Syracuse, New York	Dirt	(United States) Johnny Thomson	(United States) Bobby Grim
9	September 17	(United States) Hoosier Hundred	Indiana State Fairgrounds	Indianapolis, Indiana	Dirt	(United States) Rodger Ward	(United States) A. J. Foyt
10	September 25	(United States) Trenton 100	Trenton International Speedway	Trenton, New Jersey	Paved	(United States) Don Branson	(United States) Eddie Sachs
11	October 30	(United States) Golden State 100	California State Fairgrounds	Sacramento, California	Dirt	(United States) Don Branson	(United States) A. J. Foyt
12	November 20	(United States) Bobby Ball Memorial	Arizona State Fairgrounds	Phoenix, Arizona	Dirt	(United States) Bob Cleberg	(United States) A. J. Foyt

Paved/Dirt Oval
Road Course/Hill Climb
Non-championship race

^A Indianapolis 500 was USAC-sanctioned and counted towards the 1960 FIA World Championship of Drivers title.
^B No pole is awarded for the Pikes Peak Hill Climb, in this schedule on the pole is the driver who started first. No lap led was awarded for the Pikes Peak Hill Climb, however, a lap was awarded to the drivers that completed the climb.

== Final points standings ==
Pos	Driver	TRE1 (United States)	INDY (United States)	MIL1 (United States)	LHS (United States)	SPR (United States)	MIL2 (United States)	DQSF (United States)	SYR (United States)	ISF (United States)	TRE2 (United States)	CSF (United States)	ASF (United States)	Pts
1	(United States) A. J. Foyt	4	25	2	16	17	2	1	3	1	3	1	1	1680
2	(United States) Rodger Ward	1	2	1		DNQ	**21**	16	18	**14**	2	17	10	1390
3	(United States) Don Branson	22	4	22	**15**	**7**	19	**8**	12	4	**4**	**3**	4	1220
4	(United States) Jim Rathmann		1	DNQ			18				21			1000
5	(United States) Tony Bettenhausen	2	23	4	DNQ	15	14	2	2	2	6	5	16	940
6	(United States) Gene Force	5	28	7	3	DNQ	5	12	16	3	9	6	7	830
7	(United States) Johnny Thomson	**20**	5	18	DNQ	9	23	9	**4**	5				800
8	(United States) Len Sutton	18	30	3		8	1	DNQ	DNQ	7	5	10	DNQ	780
9	(United States) Lloyd Ruby		7	**6**	11	4	17	6	7	DNQ	8	DNQ	13	710
10	(United States) Jim Packard	6	DNQ	DNQ	2	1	6	5	13	18	20			700
11	(United States) Paul Goldsmith		3											700
12	(United States) Eddie Sachs	8	**21**	5	13	2	20	4	11	13	1	DNQ		650
13	(United States) Wayne Weiler	7	24	21	DNQ	5	7	DNQ	DNQ	19	7	11	3	500
14	(United States) Bobby Grim	10	16	19	8	18	DNQ	7	1	16	DNQ	9	5	480
15	(United States) Eddie Johnson		6	DNQ	DNQ	DNQ	11	DNQ	DNQ	DNQ	22			440
16	(United States) Jim Hurtubise	17	18	11	1	10	26	13	15	12	13	14	2	420
17	(United States) Dick Rathmann		31	10	10		3	DNQ		DNQ	10			370
18	(United States) Parnelli Jones RY			16	6	DNQ	13	18	6	17	19	2	DNQ	333
19	(United States) Roger McCluskey R			DNQ	5	13	DNQ	15	DNQ	6	11	4	DNQ	320
20	(United States) Al Farmer	11	DNQ	DNQ	4	16	25	3	DNQ	15	DNQ	DNQ	11	300
21	(United States) Elmer George				DNQ	3		14	8	DNQ		13	6	270
22	(United States) Ernie Koch R					14	9	DNQ	5	DNQ	12	7	DNQ	250
23	(United States) Bob Veith		8	14					DNP					250
24	(United States) Don Freeland	21	22	DNQ		DNQ	4		DNS					240
25	(United States) Bud Tingelstad R		9	DNQ			DNQ		DNQ	DNQ	14	12	DNQ	210
26	(United States) Jim McWithey	3	29	DNQ	14		12	DNQ			15			160
27	(United States) Shorty Templeman		17	13		DNQ	10	10	9	9			DNQ	157
28	(United States) Bob Christie		10											150
29	(United States) Chuck Stevenson		15	20	DNQ	6	24	17	DNP	8				130
30	(United States) Dempsey Wilson		33	DNQ	DNQ	DNQ	8	DNQ	17	DNQ	18	DNQ	DNQ	100
31	(United States) Red Amick	DNQ	11	DNQ	17									100
32	(United States) Jack Rounds		DNQ	DNQ	7	11			DNP			18		80
33	(United States) Chuck Hulse		DNQ					11	10	11	17	DNQ	17	70
34	(United States) Jack Turner		DNQ	8			15		DNQ	DNQ				50
35	(United States) Bruce Jacobi R		DNP	DNQ			DNQ			DNQ	DNQ		8	50
36	(United States) A. J. Shepherd R											8	DNQ	50
37	(United States) Bill Homeier		13	DNQ	9	12	DNQ	DNQ	DNS			DNS		50
38	(United States) Duane Carter		12	DNQ										50
39	(United States) Johnny Boyd		27	9			22	DNQ		DNQ				40
40	(United States) Gig Stephens	9	DNQ											40
41	(United States) Don Davis R											DNQ	9	40
42	(United States) Lee Drollinger	12	DNQ			DNQ		DNQ	DNQ	10		15	14	40
43	(United States) Jiggs Peters				12	DNQ			DNQ	DNP	16			10
44	(United States) Bob Cleberg		DNQ	DNQ		DNQ			DNQ	DNQ	DNQ		**12**	10
45	(United States) Bill Cheesbourg	DNQ	DNQ	12	DNQ		DNQ			DNQ				10
-	(United States) Chuck Arnold	13	DNQ		DNQ	DNQ		DNQ	DNP		DNQ			0
-	(United States) Gene Hartley	19	14	DNQ										0
-	(United States) Al Herman	14	32											0
-	(United States) Harold Leep R					DNQ	DNQ	DNQ	14					0
-	(United States) Bill Hyde											DNQ	15	0
-	(United States) Len Duncan	15												0
-	(United States) Nelson Stacy R			15										0
-	(United States) Chuck Rodee		DNQ	17			16				DNQ			0
-	(United States) Danny Jones R											16	18	0
-	(United States) Ralph Liguori	16								DNQ				0
-	(United States) Jimmy Bryan		19	DNQ	18									0
-	(United States) Troy Ruttman		20	DNQ										0
-	(United States) Eddie Russo		26											0
-	(United States) Ebb Rose		DNQ	DNQ			DNQ		DNS		DNQ			0
-	(United States) Tommy Copp			DNQ			DNQ			DNQ	DNQ	DNQ		0
-	(United States) Jimmy Davies			DNQ			DNQ	DNQ		DNQ				0
-	(United States) Norm Hall		DNQ	DNQ			DNQ					DNQ		0
-	(United States) Johnny Tolan		DNQ	DNQ			DNQ							0
-	(United States) Paul Russo		DNQ			DNQ		DNQ						0
-	(Canada) Bob McLean	DNQ					DNQ		DNP					0
-	(United States) Johnny Coy								DNP	DNQ	DNQ			0
-	(United States) Russ Congdon		DNQ	DNQ										0
-	(United States) Cliff Griffith		DNQ	DNQ										0
-	(United States) Tony Romit	DNQ			DNQ									0
-	(United States) Mike Magill		DNQ		DNQ									0
-	(United States) Bob Tattersall							DNQ		DNQ				0
-	(United States) Mike McGreevy											DNQ	DNQ	0
-	(United States) Jim Hemmings								DNP	DNQ				0
-	(United States) George Constantine	DNQ												0
-	(United States) Jimmy Daywalt		DNQ											0
-	(United States) Duke Dinsmore		DNQ											0
-	(United States) Jack Ensley		DNQ											0
-	(United States) Bob Gregg		DNQ											0
-	(United States) Eddie Jackson		DNQ											0
-	(United States) Al Keller		DNQ											0
-	(United States) Marvin Pifer		DNQ											0
-	(United States) Bob Wente		DNQ											0
-	(United States) Chuck Weyant		DNQ											0
-	(United States) Wib Spalding						DNQ							0
-	(United States) Bobby Marshman										DNQ			0
-	(United States) Cliff Spalding											DNQ		0
-	(United States) Don Horvath												DNQ	0
-	(United States) Foster Campbell		DNP											0
-	(United States) Leon Clum		DNP											0
Pos	Driver	TRE1 (United States)	INDY (United States)	MIL1 (United States)	LHS (United States)	SPR (United States)	MIL2 (United States)	DQSF (United States)	SYR (United States)	ISF (United States)	TRE2 (United States)	CSF (United States)	ASF (United States)	Pts

Color	Result
Gold	Winner
Silver	2nd place
Bronze	3rd place
Green	4th & 5th place
Light Blue	6th-10th place
Dark Blue	Finished (Outside Top 10)
Purple	Did not finish (Ret)
Red	Did not qualify (DNQ)
Brown	Withdrawn (Wth)
Black	Disqualified (DSQ)
White	Did not start (DNS)
Blank	Did not participate (DNP)
Blank	Not competing

**In-line notation**
**Bold**	Pole position
Italics	Ran fastest race lap
*	Led most race laps
RY Rookie of the Year
R Rookie

== See also ==
- 1960 Indianapolis 500
