= Eppers =

Eppers is a surname. Notable people with the surname include:

- Charles Eppers (1919–1999), American politician from Iowa
- Otto Eppers (1893–1955), American cartoonist and illustrator

== See also ==
- Epperly (disambiguation)
- Epper (surname)
