= 1960 Indianapolis 500 =

American motor race

44th Indianapolis 500
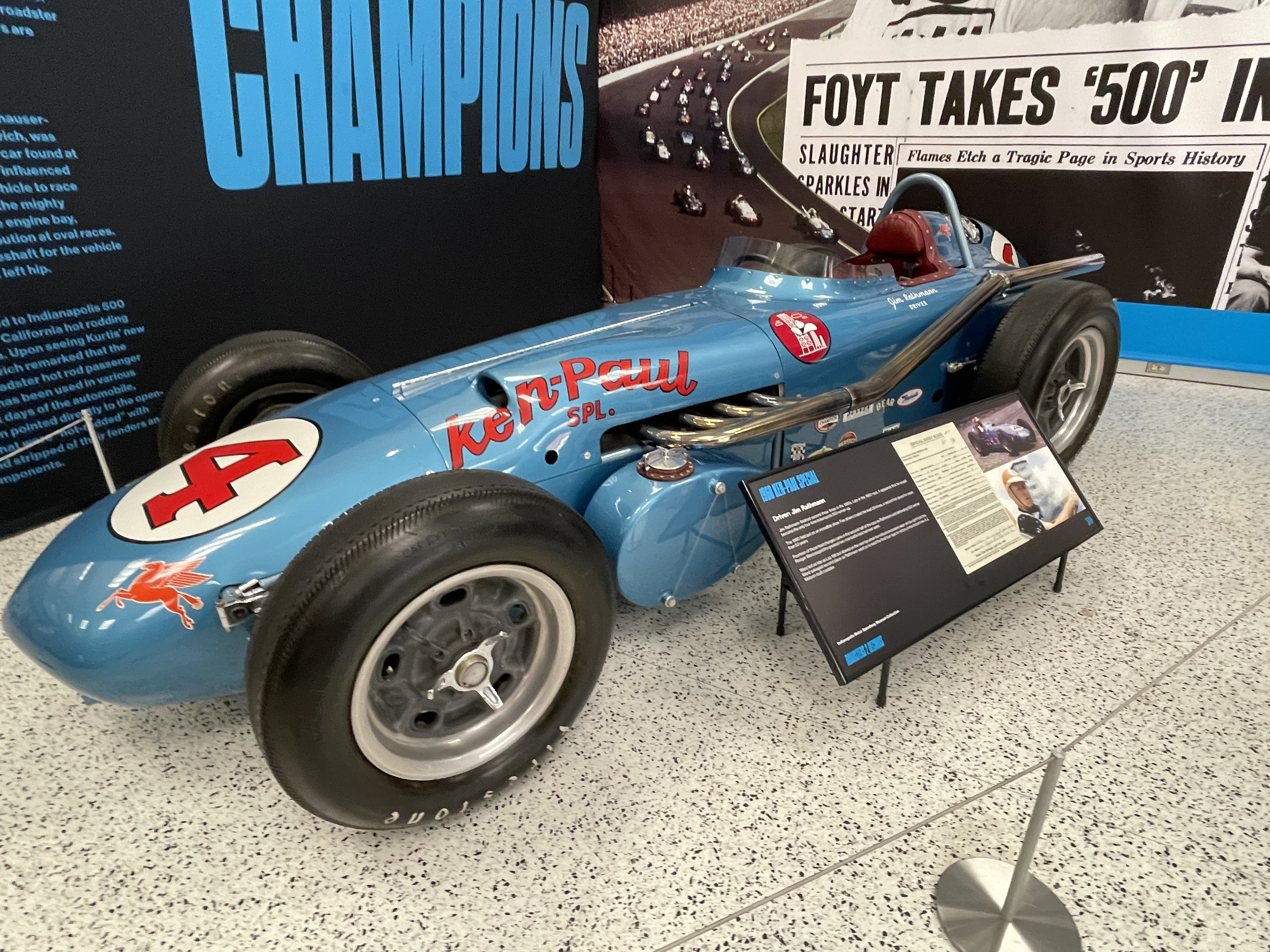

Indianapolis Motor Speedway

Indianapolis 500
- Sanctioning body: United States Auto Club
- Season: 1960 USAC National Championship; 1960 Formula One season
- Date: May 30, 1960
- Winner: Jim Rathmann
- Winning team: Ken-Paul
- Winning Chief Mechanic: Takeo "Chickie" Hirashima
- Time of race: 3:36:11.36
- Average speed: 138.767 mph (223.324 km/h)
- Pole position: Eddie Sachs
- Pole speed: 146.592 mph (235.917 km/h)
- Most laps led: Jim Rathmann (100)

Pre-race ceremonies
- Pace car: Oldsmobile
- Pace car driver: Sam Hanks
- Starter: Bill Vanderwater
- Honorary referee: Raymond Firestone
- Estimated attendance: 200,000

Chronology
| Previous | Next |
|---|---|
| 1959 | 1961 |

The 1960 Indianapolis 500 (officially the 44th International 500-Mile Sweepstakes) was a United States Auto Club (USAC)-sanctioned open-wheel race that was held on May 30, 1960, at the Indianapolis Motor Speedway in Speedway, Indiana. It was the second race of the 1960 USAC National Championship, the third race in Formula One's 1960 World Championship for Drivers, and the 44th running of the event.

Often regarded as the greatest two-man duel in Indianapolis 500 history, the 1960 race saw a then-record 29 lead changes (a record that stood until 2012). Jim Rathmann and Rodger Ward battled out nearly the entire second half. Rathmann took the lead for good on lap 197 after Ward was forced to slow down with a worn out tire. Rathmann's margin of victory of 12.75 seconds was the second-closest finish in Indy history at the time.

The inaugural 500 Festival Open Invitation was held at the Speedway Golf Course in the four days leading up to the race.

== Time trials ==
Time trials was scheduled for four days, but the third day was rained out.

- Saturday May 14 – Pole Day time trials
  - Eddie Sachs set a track record of 146.592 mph to win the pole position.
- Sunday May 15 – Second day time trials
- Saturday May 21 – Third day time trials
  - The third day of time trials was rained out.
- Sunday May 22 – Fourth day time trials
  - Jim Hurtubise nearly broke the elusive and much-anticipated 150 mph barrier. Hurtubise's four-lap qualifying average of 149.056 mph featured a new one-lap record of 149.601 mph (on lap 3), to establish himself as the fastest qualifier in the field.

After Carburetion tests, Dempsey Wilson replaced Jimmy Daywalt as the driver for the #23 entry, and the car was moved to the rear of the starting grid.

== Starting grid ==
| Row | Inside | | Middle | | Outside | |
|---|---|---|---|---|---|---|
| 1 | 6 | (United States) Eddie Sachs | 4 | (United States) Jim Rathmann | 1 | (United States) Rodger Ward W |
| 2 | 97 | (United States) Dick Rathmann | 9 | (United States) Len Sutton | 28 | (United States) Troy Ruttman W |
| 3 | 22 | (United States) Eddie Johnson | 7 | (United States) Don Branson | 65 | (United States) Chuck Stevenson |
| 4 | 10 | (United States) Jimmy Bryan W | 73 | (United States) Don Freeland | 98 | (United States) Lloyd Ruby R |
| 5 | 8 | (United States) Johnny Boyd | 38 | (United States) Bob Christie | 32 | (United States) Wayne Weiler R |
| 6 | 5 | (United States) A. J. Foyt | 3 | (United States) Johnny Thomson | 2 | (United States) Tony Bettenhausen |
| 7 | 26 | (United States) Shorty Templeman | 37 | (United States) Gene Force | 14 | (United States) Bobby Grim |
| 8 | 27 | (United States) Red Amick | 56 | (United States) Jim Hurtubise R | 48 | (United States) Gene Hartley |
| 9 | 44 | (United States) Bob Veith | 99 | (United States) Paul Goldsmith | 17 | (United States) Duane Carter |
| 10 | 18 | (United States) Bud Tingelstad R | 46 | (United States) Eddie Russo | 76 | (United States) Al Herman |
| 11 | 39 | (United States) Bill Homeier | 16 | (United States) Jim McWithey | 23 | (United States) Dempsey Wilson |

R Indianapolis 500 rookie
W Indianapolis 500 winner

=== Alternates ===
- First alternate: Chuck Rodee R (#89)

=== Failed to qualify ===
- Chuck Arnold (#21)
- Foster Campbell R (#62) – Entry declined, not enough experience
- Bill Cheesbourg (#45)
- Bob Cleberg R (#61)
- Leon Clum R (#95) – Entry declined, not enough experience
- Russ Congdon R (#79)
- Jimmy Daywalt (#23) – Raced by Dempsey Wilson
- Duke Dinsmore (#95)
- Lee Drollinger R (#58)
- Jack Ensley R (#17)
- Cotton Farmer R (#31, #69)
- Cliff Griffith (#29)
- Norm Hall R (#31, #39, #92)
- Chuck Hulse R (#43, #69)
- Eddie Jackson R (#62) – Entry declined, not enough experience
- Bruce Jacobi R (#95) – Entry declined, not enough experience
- Al Keller (#35, #57)
- Mike Magill (#77)
- Jim Packard R (#71)
- Marvin Pifer R (#87)
- Ebb Rose R (#41)
- Jack Rounds R (#52)
- Paul Russo (#31, #47, #49)
- Gig Stephens R (#21)
- Johnnie Tolan (#24)
- Jack Turner (#25, #31)
- Bob Wente R (#95) – Did not finish rookie test
- Chuck Weyant (#87, #88)

== Spectator fatalities ==
Two spectators in the infield, Fred H. Linder, 36, of Indianapolis, and William C. Craig, 37, of Zionsville, were killed, and as many as 82 were injured, when a homemade scaffolding collapsed. Approximately 125–130 patrons had paid a small fee ($5–$10) to view the race from the 30-foot tall scaffolding, erected by a private individual (Wilbur Shortridge Jr.) and not the Speedway – a practice that was allowed at the time. The structure was partially anchored to a pick-up truck, and situated in the infield of turn three. Over the years, the private scaffold platforms had become a popular fixture at the Speedway, with often many located around the massive infield. They were not sponsored by the track, and at times, the track management would attempt to curtail the practice, with safety in mind. However, enforcement was inconsistent, and they were not banned outright prior to 1960.

During the parade lap as the field drove by, the people on the platform began to lean and wave at the cars, which caused the scaffolding to become unstable. It soon tipped forward and fell to the ground, crushing people who were underneath the structure, and the 125–130 people who were on it either fell or jumped to the ground. Linder and Craig were pronounced dead of broken necks, and over 80 were injured, about 22 seriously.

After the accident, the Speedway banned "bootleg" homemade scaffolds at the track, a rule that still exists to this day. The track management was scrutinized by the state fire marshal and other officials for allowing the scaffolds to be constructed without permits, inspections, or any sort of safety rules. Other reports even criticized spectators who witnessed the tragedy and did little to offer help, whereas many in attendance were totally unaware of the accident. Johnny Rutherford, who was attending the race for the first time as a spectator, claims to have witnessed the accident. In addition, his future wife Betty Hoyer, a student nurse, attended to the scene.

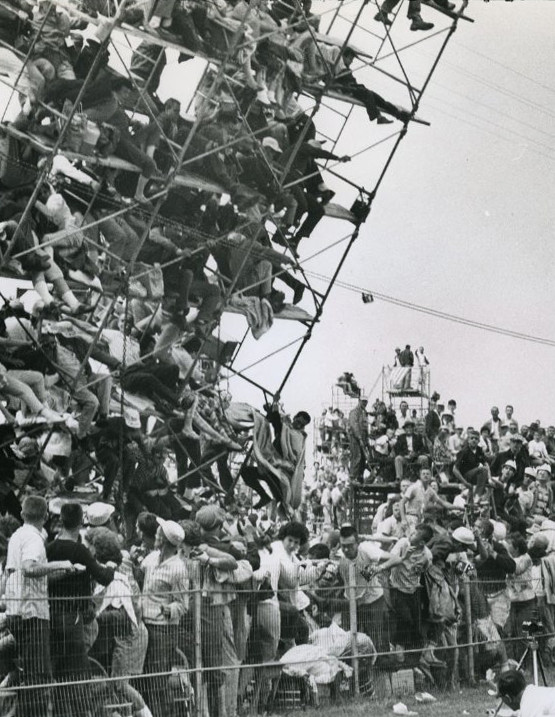
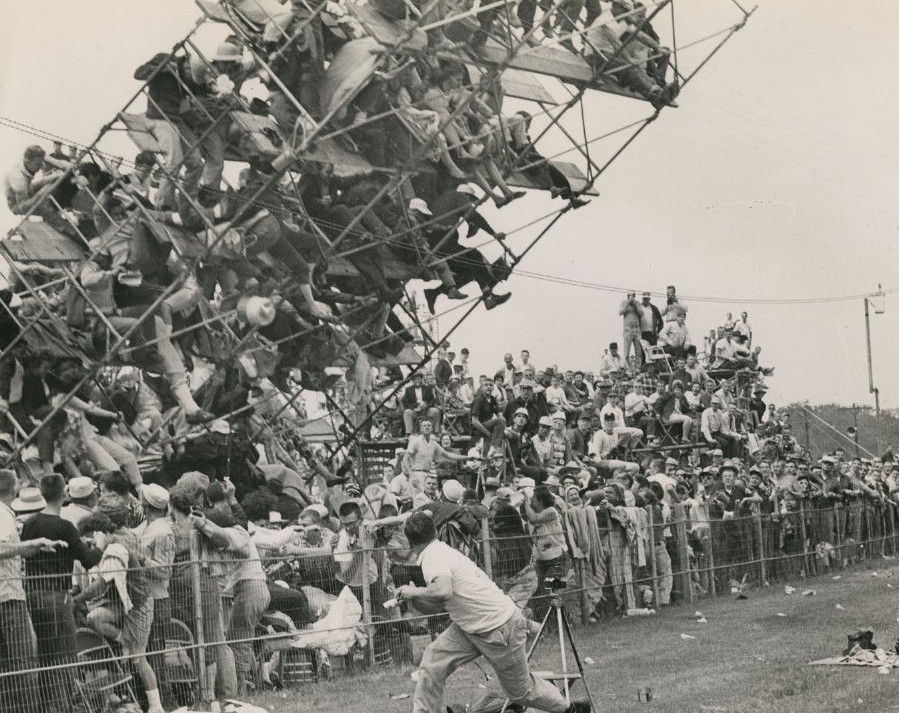
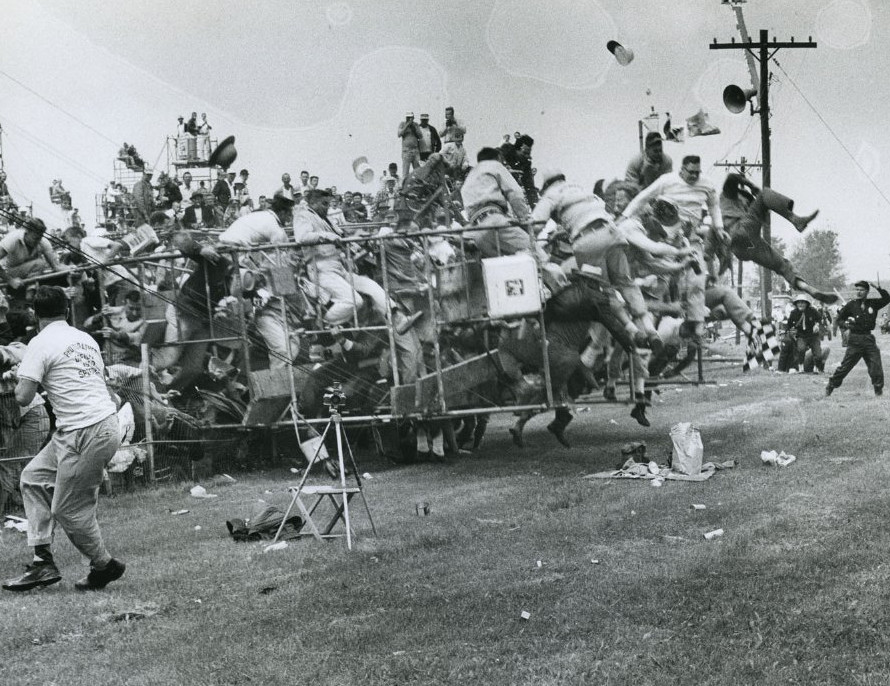
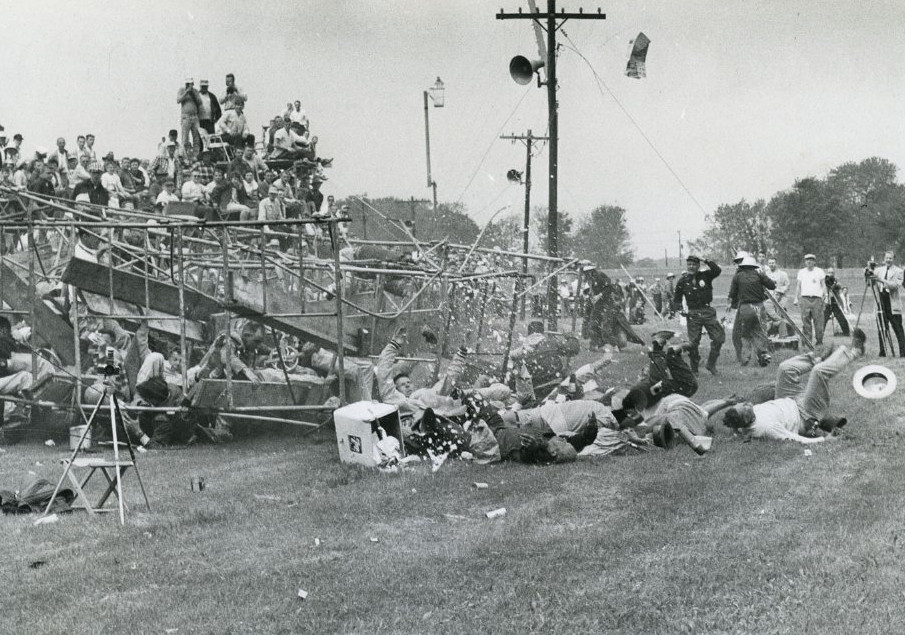
The scaffold collapse was captured in a prize-winning series of images by Indianapolis News photographer J. Parke Randall

== Race recap ==
=== First half ===
The race started out with four contenders in the first half. Rodger Ward took the lead on lap 1 from the outside of the front row. Ward led the first lap. But polesitter Eddie Sachs took the lead on lap 2. Two laps later, Ward was back in front, and the record-setting number of lead changes was already under way. Troy Ruttman and Jim Rathmann also took turns at the front.

The first caution came out on lap 47 when Duane Carter spun in turn 3. He did not hit the wall, and came to a rest in the infield grass. Carter was able to continue. Moments later, Don Branson came into the pits, but came in too hot. He lost control and did a half spin, tagging the pit wall. The crew jumped out of the way, and no one was injured. The damage was minimal, and Branson was able to continue.

On lap 66, Jim McWithey came into the pits without any brakes. He brushed the inside pit wall trying to slow the car down, but failed to stop. He continued through the pit lane and finally came to rest in the infield grass in turn 1. On lap 88 Eddie Russo hit the wall exiting turn two, and slid down the backstretch. Russo was taken to the hospital for a scalp wound and a concussion. During the yellow for Russo's crash, Wayne Weiler brushed the wall in turn two. His car suffered suspension damage, and he dropped out after 103 laps.

The green came back out on lap 100, but almost immediately, the yellow light was back on. Chuck Stevenson spun in the south short-chute exiting the pits. Stevenson was able to continue in the race. It was the fourth and final yellow light period of the afternoon. The green came back out for good on lap 110.

Rodger Ward stalled his engine twice during his first pit stop. Going into the race, Ward was concerned over a novice crew member assigned to change one of the tires. After the new crew member proved up to the task, Ward said he embarrassingly was the one who ruined the stop, and cost himself considerable track position. After getting back on the track, he started charging to catch up to the front of the field. Shortly after the halfway point, Eddie Sachs and Troy Ruttman would both drop out of the race, ultimately leaving Rathmann and Ward to battle it out in front.

=== Second half ===
On about lap 124, Tony Bettenhausen came in for a routine pit stop. He complained of a smoking engine, but returned to the track. One lap later, he was back in the pits with a fire and a blown engine. Bettenhausen was unhurt, but hoisted himself out of the cockpit as it was coasting to stop in the pits to avoid getting burned. The safety crew extinguished the fire and no one was injured.

In the second half, Rodger Ward had caught up to Jim Rathmann, with Johnny Thomson close behind in third. Rathmann and Ward swapped the lead several times, meanwhile Ward was hoping that the pace would slow down, in order to save his tires to the end. After stalling in the pits earlier, the hard charge Ward made to get back to the front was a concern. He feared that he had worn out his tires prematurely. Ward was aware of Rathmann's tendencies as a driver, and allowed Rathmann to pass him for the lead. Rathmann had a reputation for charging hard to take the lead, but once he was in the lead, he would often back the pace down. Ward's prediction came true, but it was at the expense of losing ground to third place. Johnny Thomson was now catching up. Thomson's day was not without incident, however. He blew a right rear tire around lap 145; but it occurred as he was already pulling into his pit stall for a routine pit stop.

Ward and Rathmann came in for their final scheduled pit stops on lap 148. Ward's crew had him out first, with Rathmann right behind.

With 48 laps to go, three cars were on the lead lap. Rathmann now led Ward, and Thomson was just ten second behind in third place. With Thomson closing in on the leaders, Ward and Rathmann started charging again, racing each other hard, swapping the lead several times between themselves. Thomson narrowed the deficit to about 8 seconds, but on lap 172 his engine started losing power. He slowed and wound up nursing his car to a 5th-place finish.

=== Finish ===
Inside ten laps to go, Rodger Ward seemed to have the faster car, and he took the lead on lap 194. He was less than six laps from victory. Having won in 1959, it would have been his second-consecutive victory. A few moments later though, Ward observed the cords in his right front tire showing, and he backed off the pace. Jim Rathmann took the lead for good on lap 197, and pulled away for victory. Due to Ward's extensive experience as a tire tester for Firestone, he was able to nurse his car to the finish line without pitting to change the bad tire. He finished second place, about 12 seconds behind Rathmann. Despite winning twice in his career (1959 and 1962), Rodger Ward often considered this race his personal best.

Paul Goldsmith charged from 26th starting position to finish 3rd, holding off 4th place Don Branson by about a car length.

== Box score ==
| Finish | Grid | No. | Driver | Constructor | Qualifying | | Laps | Status | Points | |
| Finish | Grid | No. | Driver | Constructor | Speed | Rank | Laps | Status | USAC | WDC |
|---|---|---|---|---|---|---|---|---|---|---|
| 1 | 2 | 4 | (United States) Jim Rathmann | Watson-Offenhauser | 146.37 | 4 | 200 | 138.767 mph | 1,000 | 8 |
| 2 | 3 | 1 | (United States) Rodger Ward W | Watson-Offenhauser | 145.56 | 5 | 200 | +12.75 | 800 | 6 |
| 3 | 26 | 99 | (United States) Paul Goldsmith | Epperly-Offenhauser | 142.78 | 27 | 200 | +3:07.30 | 700 | 4 |
| 4 | 8 | 7 | (United States) Don Branson | Phillips-Offenhauser | 144.75 | 11 | 200 | +3:07.98 | 600 | 3 |
| 5 | 17 | 3 | (United States) Johnny Thomson | Lesovsky-Offenhauser | 146.44 | 3 | 200 | +3:11.35 | 500 | 2 |
| 6 | 7 | 22 | (United States) Eddie Johnson | Trevis-Offenhauser | 145.00 | 10 | 200 | +4:10.61 | 400 | 1 |
| 7 | 12 | 98 | (United States) Lloyd Ruby R | Watson-Offenhauser | 144.20 | 15 | 200 | +4:25.59 | 300 | |
| 8 | 25 | 44 | (United States) Bob Veith | Meskowski-Offenhauser | 143.36 | 23 | 200 | +5:17.48 | 250 | |
| 9 | 28 | 18 | (United States) Bud Tingelstad R | Trevis-Offenhauser | 142.35 | 29 | 200 | +8:19.91 | 200 | |
| 10 | 14 | 38 | (United States) Bob Christie | Kurtis Kraft-Offenhauser | 143.63 | 19 | 200 | +8:40.28 | 150 | |
| 11 | 22 | 27 | (United States) Red Amick | Epperly-Offenhauser | 143.08 | 26 | 200 | +11:10.58 | 100 | |
| 12 | 27 | 17 | (United States) Duane Carter | Kuzma-Offenhauser | 142.63 | 28 | 200 | +11:17.20 | 50 | |
| 13 | 31 | 39 | (United States) Bill Homeier | Kuzma-Offenhauser | 141.24 | 32 | 200 | +12:10.71 | | |
| 14 | 24 | 48 | (United States) Gene Hartley | Kurtis Kraft-Offenhauser | 143.89 | 16 | 196 | -4 Laps | | |
| 15 | 9 | 65 | (United States) Chuck Stevenson | Watson-Offenhauser | 144.66 | 12 | 196 | -4 Laps | | |
| 16 | 21 | 14 | (United States) Bobby Grim | Meskowski-Offenhauser | 143.15 | 25 | 194 | -6 Laps | | |
| 17 | 19 | 26 | (United States) Shorty Templeman | Kurtis Kraft-Offenhauser | 143.85 | 17 | 191 | Clutch | | |
| 18 | 23 | 56 | (United States) Jim Hurtubise R | Christensen-Offenhauser | 149.05 | 1 | 185 | Engine | | |
| 19 | 10 | 10 | (United States) Jimmy Bryan W | Salih-Offenhauser | 144.53 | 13 | 152 | Fuel System | | |
| 20 | 6 | 28 | (United States) Troy Ruttman W | Watson-Offenhauser | 145.36 | 8 | 134 | Axle | | |
| 21 | 1 | 6 | (United States) Eddie Sachs | Ewing-Offenhauser | 146.59 | 2 | 132 | Magneto | | |
| 22 | 11 | 73 | (United States) Don Freeland | Kurtis Kraft-Offenhauser | 144.35 | 14 | 129 | Magneto | | |
| 23 | 18 | 2 | (United States) Tony Bettenhausen | Watson-Offenhauser | 145.21 | 9 | 125 | Engine | | |
| 24 | 15 | 32 | (United States) Wayne Weiler R | Epperly-Offenhauser | 143.51 | 20 | 103 | Accident | | |
| 25 | 16 | 5 | (United States) A. J. Foyt | Kurtis Kraft-Offenhauser | 143.46 | 22 | 90 | Clutch | | |
| 26 | 29 | 46 | (United States) Eddie Russo | Kurtis Kraft-Offenhauser | 142.20 | 30 | 90 | Accident | | |
| 27 | 13 | 8 | (United States) Johnny Boyd | Epperly-Offenhauser | 143.77 | 18 | 77 | Engine | | |
| 28 | 20 | 37 | (United States) Gene Force | Kurtis Kraft-Offenhauser | 143.47 | 21 | 74 | Brakes | | |
| 29 | 32 | 16 | (United States) Jim McWithey | Epperly-Offenhauser | 140.37 | 33 | 60 | Brakes | | |
| 30 | 5 | 9 | (United States) Len Sutton | Watson-Offenhauser | 145.44 | 7 | 47 | Engine | | |
| 31 | 4 | 97 | (United States) Dick Rathmann | Watson-Offenhauser | 145.54 | 6 | 42 | Brakes | | |
| 32 | 30 | 76 | (United States) Al Herman | Ewing-Offenhauser | 141.83 | 31 | 34 | Clutch | | |
| 33 | 33 | 23 | (United States) Dempsey Wilson | Kurtis Kraft-Offenhauser | 143.21 | 24 | 11 | Magneto | | |

W Former Indianapolis 500 winner

R Indianapolis 500 Rookie

All entrants utilized Firestone tires.

=== Race statistics ===
Lap Leaders
| Laps | Leader |
|---|---|
| 1 | Rodger Ward |
| 2–3 | Eddie Sachs |
| 4–18 | Rodger Ward |
| 19–24 | Troy Ruttman |
| 25–37 | Jim Rathmann |
| 38–41 | Rodger Ward |
| 42–51 | Eddie Sachs |
| 52–56 | Troy Ruttman |
| 57–61 | Eddie Sachs |
| 62–69 | Jim Rathmann |
| 70–72 | Eddie Sachs |
| 73–74 | Jim Rathmann |
| 75 | Eddie Sachs |
| 76–85 | Jim Rathmann |
| 86–95 | Johnny Thomson |
| 96–122 | Jim Rathmann |
| 123–127 | Rodger Ward |
| 128–141 | Jim Rathmann |
| 142–146 | Rodger Ward |
| 147 | Jim Rathmann |
| 148–151 | Rodger Ward |
| 152–162 | Jim Rathmann |
| 163–169 | Rodger Ward |
| 170 | Jim Rathmann |
| 171–177 | Rodger Ward |
| 178–182 | Jim Rathmann |
| 183–189 | Rodger Ward |
| 190–193 | Jim Rathmann |
| 194–196 | Rodger Ward |
| 197–200 | Jim Rathmann |

Total laps led
| Driver | Laps |
|---|---|
| Jim Rathmann | 100 |
| Rodger Ward | 58 |
| Eddie Sachs | 21 |
| Troy Ruttman | 11 |
| Johnny Thomson | 10 |

Yellow Lights: 4 for 29 minutes, 7 seconds
| Laps* | Reason |
|---|---|
| 45–46 | Duane Carter spin in turn 3 (1:15) |
| 47 | Don Branson spin in pits (0:54) |
| 88–100 | Eddie Russo crash in turn 2 (13:07) |
| 101–110 | Chuck Stevenson spin in shouthchute (13:51) |
* – Approximate lap counts

== Race notes ==
- Fastest Lead Lap: Jim Rathmann – 1:01.59
- The 1960 Indianapolis 500 was the final 500 which featured a 33-car field consisting of all front-engined cars.
- The weather on race day would reach a high of 75 °F (24 °C) with wind speeds up to 15 miles per hour (24 km/h). Climate historians would consider this to be the "traditional" climate for an Indianapolis 500 race.
- Despite some published claims that it was Smokey Yunick, the race-winning chief mechanic for Rathmann was Takeo "Chickie" Hirashima.
- Final Indianapolis 500 start for Jimmy Bryan. He would fall out of the race after completing 152 laps due to a fuel system problem. He died on June 19 after being involved in a crash during the championship race at Langhorne.

== World Drivers' Championship ==
1960 Indianapolis 500
Race 3 of 10 in the 1960 Formula One season
| ← Previous race | Next race → |

Race details
- Date: May 30, 1960
- Location: Indianapolis Motor Speedway; Speedway, Indiana
- Course: Permanent racing facility
- Course length: 4.023 km (2.500 miles)
- Distance: 200 laps, 804.672 km (500.000 miles)

=== Background ===
The Indianapolis 500 was included in the FIA World Championship of Drivers from 1950 through 1960. The race was sanctioned by AAA through 1955, and then by USAC beginning in 1956. At the time the new world championship was announced and first organized by the CSI, the United States did not yet have a Grand Prix. Indianapolis Motor Speedway vice president and general manager Theodore E. "Pop" Meyers lobbied that the Indianapolis 500 be selected as the race to represent the country and to pay points towards the world championship.

Drivers competing at the Indianapolis 500 in 1950 through 1960 were credited with participation in and earned points towards the World Championship of Drivers. However, the machines competing at Indianapolis were not necessarily run to Formula One specifications and regulations. The drivers also earned separate points (on a different scale) towards the respective AAA or USAC national championships. No points, however, were awarded by the FIA towards the World Constructors' Championship.

=== Summary ===
The 1960 Indianapolis 500 was round 3 of 10 on the 1960 World Championship. The event, however, failed to attract interest from any of the regular competitors on the Grand Prix circuit, particularly since it was held the day after the Monaco Grand Prix. Race winner Jim Rathmann earned 8 points towards the World Championship. Despite not competing in any of the other World Championship events, he finished eighth in the final season standings. This would be the final time the Indianapolis 500 paid points towards the World Championship of Drivers.

==== World Drivers' Championship standings after the race ====
| | Pos | Driver | Points |
|---|---|---|---|
| | 1 | (New Zealand) Bruce McLaren | 14 |
| | 2 | (United Kingdom) Stirling Moss | 8 |
| 31 | 3 | (United States) Jim Rathmann | 8 |
| 1 | 4 | (United Kingdom) Cliff Allison | 6 |
| 29 | 5 | (United States) Rodger Ward | 6 |

- Notes: Only the top five positions are included.

== Broadcasting ==
=== Radio ===
The race was carried live on the IMS Radio Network. Sid Collins served as chief announcer. Fred Agabashian served as "driver expert" for the second year. After the race, Luke Walton reported from victory lane.

For the first time, the network reached South Africa via tape-delay rebroadcasts.

Indianapolis Motor Speedway Radio Network
| Booth Announcers | Turn Reporters | Pit/garage reporters |
|---|---|---|
| Chief Announcer: Sid Collins; Driver expert: Fred Agabashian; Statistician: Charlie Brockman | Turn 1: Bill Frosh; Turn 2: John Peterson; Backstretch: Bernie Herman; Turn 3: Lou Palmer; Turn 4: Jim Shelton | Greg Smith (north); Jack Shapiro (center); Luke Walton (south) |

| Previous race: 1960 Monaco Grand Prix | FIA Formula One World Championship; 1960 season | Next race: 1960 Dutch Grand Prix |
| Previous race: 1959 Indianapolis 500; Rodger Ward | 1960 Indianapolis 500; Jim Rathmann | Next race: 1961 Indianapolis 500; A. J. Foyt |
| Preceded by 135.875 mph (1959 Indianapolis 500) | Record for the Indianapolis 500 fastest average speed 138.767 mph | Succeeded by 139.130 mph (1961 Indianapolis 500) |
