= Epperly =

Epperly may refer to:

- Epperly, West Virginia, United States, an unincorporated community in Raleigh County
- Mount Epperly, in Antarctica

== People ==
- Al Epperly (1918–2003), American baseball player
- Bruce G. Epperly (born 1953), American theologian
- Jillian Mai Thi Epperly (born c. 1973/4), creator of Jilly Juice
- Quin Epperly (1913–2001), American race car builder
