= Eddie Russo =

American racing driver (1923–2012)

- Born: Edward Leon Russo; November 19, 1923 Chicago, Illinois, U.S.
- Died: October 14, 2012 (aged 88) King, Wisconsin, U.S.

Champ Car career
- 18 races run over 9 years
- Best finish: 24th (1955)
- First race: 1952 Milwaukee 200 (Milwaukee)
- Last race: 1960 Indianapolis 500 (Indianapolis)
Wins	Podiums	Poles
0	0	1

Formula One World Championship career
- Active years: 1954–1960
- Team(s): Kurtis Kraft, Pawl, Epperly, Kuzma
- Entries: 7 (4 starts)
- Championships: 0
- Wins: 0
- Podiums: 0
- Career points: 0
- Pole positions: 0
- Fastest laps: 0
- First entry: 1954 Indianapolis 500
- Last entry: 1960 Indianapolis 500

Edward Leon Russo (November 19, 1923 – October 14, 2012) was an American racing driver.

Russo won the midget car track championship at Raceway Park in Chicago in 1950. He competed in the AAA and USAC Championship Car series in the 1952-1957 and 1960 seasons, with 21 career starts, including three times in the Indianapolis 500. Russo finished in the top-ten five times, with his best finish in 1955 at Langhorne.

== World Drivers' Championship career ==
The AAA/USAC-sanctioned Indianapolis 500 was included in the FIA World Drivers' Championship from 1950 through 1960. Drivers competing at Indianapolis during those years were credited with World Drivers' Championship participation, and were eligible to score WDC points alongside those which they may have scored towards the AAA/USAC National Championship.

Russo participated in four World Drivers' Championship races at Indianapolis. His best finish was 22nd place, and he scored no World Drivers' Championship points.

== Personal life ==
Russo's father, Joe, and his uncle, Paul, also raced Indy cars.

Russo served in the U.S. Marine Corps during the Second World War, the Korean War, and the Vietnam War. Raised in Kenosha, he was a long-time resident of Racine. He died at the Wisconsin Veterans Home, where he had lived since 2005.

== Motorsports career results ==
=== Indianapolis 500 results ===
Year	Car	Start	Qual	Rank	Finish	Laps	Led	Retired
1955	37	13	140.116	9	22	112	0	Ignition
1956*	10	-	-	-	23	37	0	Brakes
1957	55	26	140.862	20	32	0	0	Crash BS
1960	46	29	142.203	30	26	84	0	Crash T2
Totals						233	0	

Starts	3
Poles	0
Front Row	0
Wins	0
Top 5	0
Top 10	0
Retired	3

* shared drive with Ed Elisian
