= Wayne Ewing =

American auto racing builder

- Ewing (bottom) with A. J. Watson
- Born: Albert Wayne Ewing; March 27, 1927; Terre Haute, Indiana, U.S.
- Died: February 12, 1986 (aged 58); Los Angeles, California, U.S.
- Occupation: Auto racing builder

Albert Wayne Ewing (March 27, 1927 – February 12, 1986) was an American race car builder. Ewing started as engineer on drag-racers, before joining as a metal-working engineer on the Indy car team assembled by A. J. Watson. Ewing occasionally branched out as an independent builder, and his cars competed in several Indianapolis 500s. Notably, Eddie Sachs qualified on the pole for the 1960 Indianapolis 500 driving a Ewing-constructed car.

== Select Indianapolis 500 results ==
Season	Driver	Grid	Classification	Points	Note	Race report
1950	Jimmy Davies	27	17			Report
1960	Eddie Sachs	1	21		Magneto	Report
1960	Al Herman	30	32		Clutch	Report
