= Jim Rathmann =

American racing driver (1928–2011)

- Born: Royal Richard Rathmann; July 16, 1928 Alhambra, California, U.S.
- Died: November 23, 2011 (aged 83) Melbourne, Florida, U.S.

Championship titles
- Major victories Race of Two Worlds (1958); Indianapolis 500 (1960)

Champ Car career
- 38 races run over 14 years
- Best finish: 2nd (1957)
- First race: 1949 Indianapolis 500 (Indianapolis)
- Last race: 1963 Indianapolis 500 (Indianapolis)
- First win: 1957 Milwaukee 200 (Milwaukee)
- Last win: 1960 Indianapolis 500 (Indianapolis)
Wins	Podiums	Poles
3	7	1

NASCAR Cup Series career
- 3 races run over 3 years
- Best finish: 89th (1950)
- First race: 1949 Race 4 (Langhorne)
- Last race: 1951 Motor City 250 (Detroit)
Wins	Top tens	Poles
0	0	0

Formula One World Championship career
- Active years: 1950, 1952 – 1960
- Team(s): Wetteroth, Kurtis Kraft, Moore, Epperly, Watson
- Entries: 10
- Championships: 0
- Wins: 1
- Podiums: 4
- Career points: 29
- Pole positions: 0
- Fastest laps: 2
- First entry: 1950 Indianapolis 500
- First win: 1960 Indianapolis 500
- Last entry: 1960 Indianapolis 500

Royal Richard "Jim" Rathmann (July 16, 1928 – November 23, 2011), was an American racing driver who competed primarily in Championship Cars. Rathmann is best known for winning the Indianapolis 500 in 1960, emerging victorious after a race-long duel with Rodger Ward – as recently as 2023, a panel of fans and historians voted Rathmann's victory as the greatest '500' of all time. In Europe he is well-known for winning the 1958 Race of Two Worlds.

Rathmann and his older brother swapped names while teenagers. As a 16-year-old going by the name of Dick Rathmann, he wanted to start racing. To enter races, he borrowed his older brother's I.D. and assumed the identity of "Jim Rathmann." The name change stuck for life in public circles.

== Driving career ==
=== Championship Car career ===
Rathmann drove in the AAA and USAC Championship Car series in the 1949–1950 and 1952–1963 seasons with 38 starts, including the Indianapolis 500 during each of those seasons. He had two victories in addition to his Indianapolis 500 win, including the USAC Daytona 100.

Rathmann also participated in the two runnings of the Race of Two Worlds at Monza, Italy, winning the 1958 race, a non-championship event.

==== 1960 Indianapolis 500 victory ====
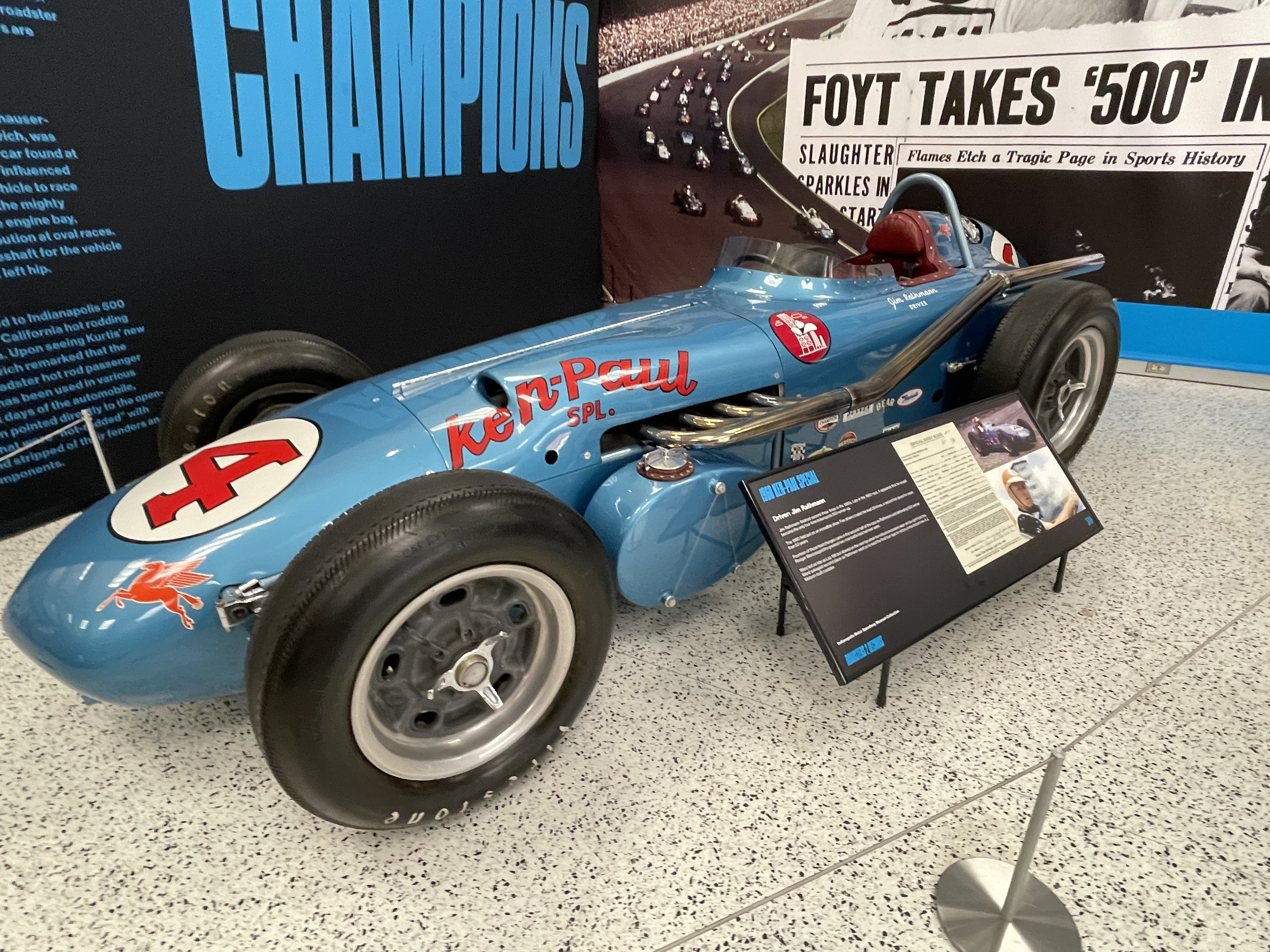
Rathmann's winning car from the 1960 Indianapolis 500

Starting in the middle of the first row, Rathmann ran in the front the entire race. From the midway point on, Rathmann and fellow driver Rodger Ward were locked in a neck and neck duel for first. Tire wear became an issue as the race wore on and Rathmann was able to keep his wheels fresh long enough to outrace Ward to the finish. The race featured the most recorded lead changes in Indianapolis 500 history, and has often been considered the greatest Indianapolis 500 ever run.

=== Stock car career ===
Rathmann competed in three NASCAR races from 1949 to 1951, competing in one race during each of those years. He debuted in 1949 at Langhorne, dropping out with mechanical issues. In 1950, Rathmann raced at the prestigious Daytona Beach Road Course. Starting 17th in this event, Rathmann finished 12th. In his final race in 1951, Rathmann started ninth at Detroit, but dropped out with mechanical issues.

=== World Drivers' Championship career ===
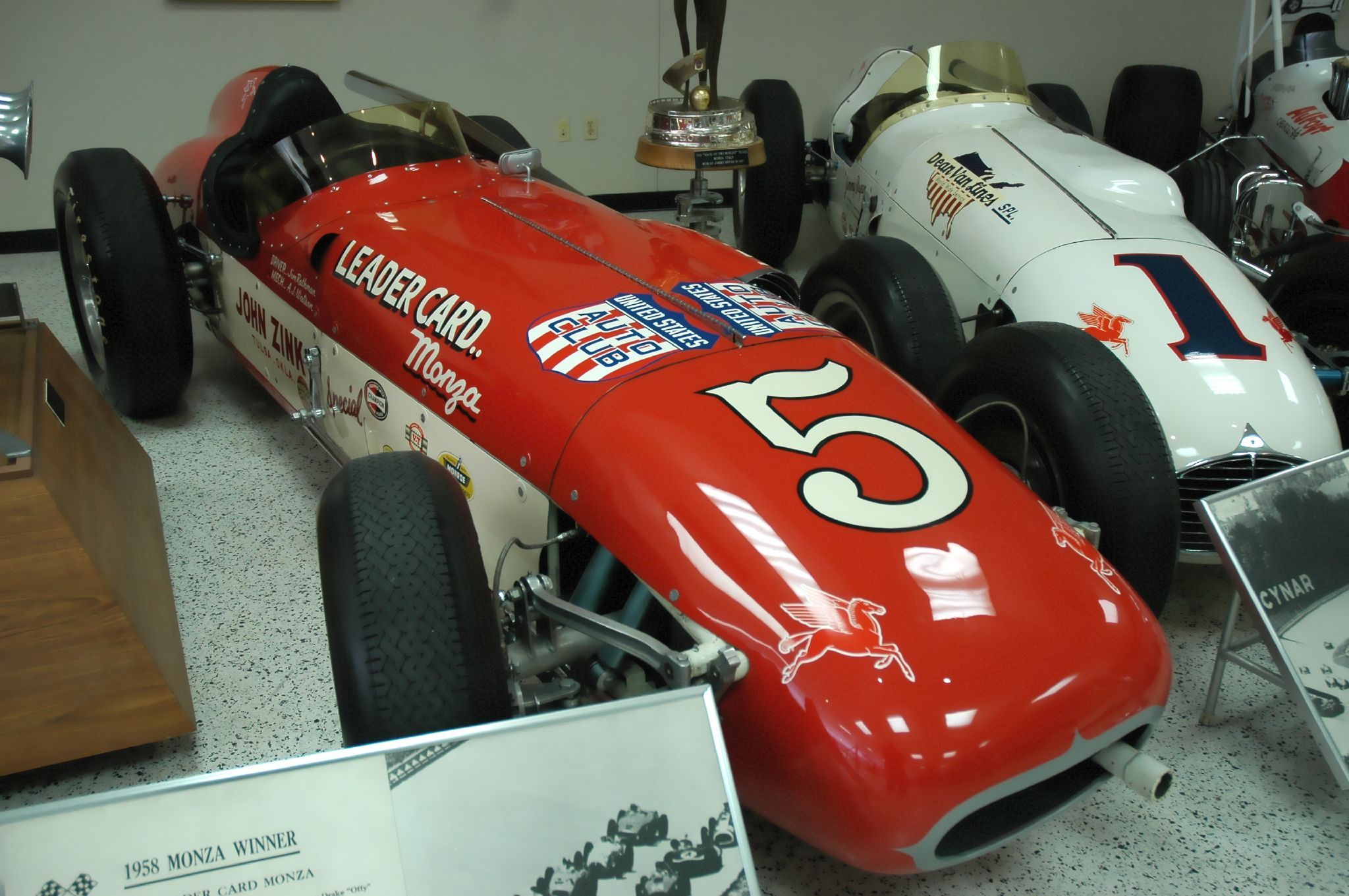
Rathmann's Watson-Offenhauser, in which he won the Race of Two Worlds in Monza, Italy.

The AAA/USAC-sanctioned Indianapolis 500 was included in the FIA World Drivers' Championship from 1950 through 1960. Drivers competing at Indianapolis during those years were credited with World Drivers' Championship points and participation in addition to those which they received towards the AAA/USAC National Championship.

Rathmann participated in ten World Drivers' Championship races at Indianapolis. He won once, finished in the top three four times, recorded two fastest laps, and accumulated 29 World Drivers' Championship points. Rathmann's points total is the largest number of World Drivers' Championship points earned by a driver competing solely in the Indianapolis 500.

== Post-racing career ==
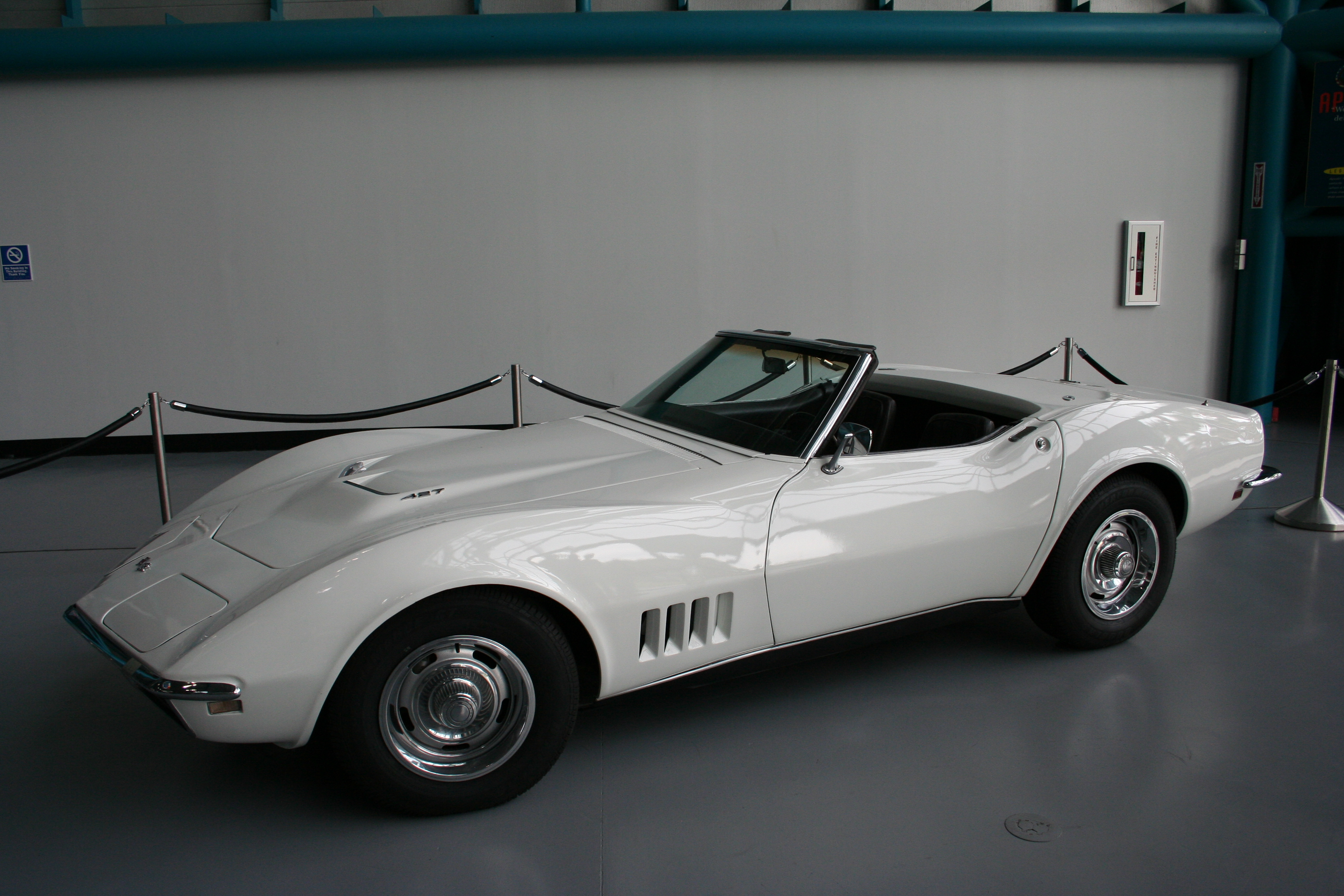
Astronaut Alan Shepard's Corvette on display at the Kennedy Space Center

Rathmann later owned a Chevrolet-Cadillac dealership in Melbourne, Florida, where he befriended astronauts Alan Shepard, Gus Grissom, and Gordon Cooper. Rathmann convinced GM President Ed Cole to set up a program which supplied each astronaut with a pair of new cars each year. Most chose a family car for their wives and a Corvette for themselves. Alan Bean recalls Corvettes lined up in the parking lot outside the astronaut offices at the Johnson Space Center in Houston, and friendly races between Shepard and Grissom along the Florida beach roads.

After retiring from the car business, Rathmann lived with his wife, Mary Kay, in Indialantic, Florida.

== Death ==
During the decades after his victory, Rathmann was a regular visitor to the Indianapolis Motor Speedway during May each year. He drove the pace car several times. However, he missed the 100th-anniversary celebration in 2011 due to failing health.

Rathmann died on November 23, 2011. He had reportedly suffered a seizure at his home days earlier and died at a hospice center in Melbourne, Florida.

== Awards and honors ==
Rathmann has been inducted into the following halls of fame:

- Florida Sports Hall of Fame (1978)
- Auto Racing Hall of Fame (1993)
- Motorsports Hall of Fame of America (2007)

== Motorsports career results ==
=== AAA/USAC Championship Car results ===
Year	1	2	3	4	5	6	7	8	9	10	11	12	13	14	Pos	Points
1949	ARL	INDY; 11	MIL	TRE	SPR	MIL	DUQ	PIK	SYR	DET	SPR	LAN	SAC	DMR; DNQ	39th	100
1950	INDY; 24	MIL	LAN	SPR	MIL	PIK	SYR	DET	SPR	SAC	PHX	BAY	DAR		-	0
1952	INDY; 2	MIL; 10	RAL; 4	SPR; DNQ	MIL; DNQ	DET	DUQ; 18	PIK	SYR; 18	DNC; DNQ	SJS	PHX			6th	1,070
1953	INDY; 7	MIL	SPR	DET	SPR	MIL	DUQ	PIK	SYR	ISF	SAC	PHX			26th	169.5
1954	INDY; 28	MIL	LAN	DAR; 27	SPR	MIL	DUQ	PIK	SYR	ISF	SAC	PHX	LVG		-	0
1955	INDY; 14	MIL; 20	LAN	SPR	MIL	DUQ	PIK	SYR	ISF	SAC	PHX				-	0
1956	INDY; 20	MIL; 19	LAN	DAR; 11	ATL; 4	SPR; DNQ	MIL; 15	DUQ; 3	SYR; DNQ	ISF; 15	SAC	PHX			23rd	300
1957	INDY; 2	LAN	MIL; 5	DET	ATL	SPR	MIL; 1	DUQ	SYR	ISF	TRE; 6	SAC; 12	PHX; 6		2nd	1,470
1958	TRE	INDY; 5	MIL; 7	LAN	ATL	SPR	MIL; 23	DUQ	SYR	ISF	TRE	SAC	PHX		14th	560
1959	DAY; 1	TRE; 4	INDY; 2	MIL; DNQ	LAN	SPR	MIL; 4	DUQ	SYR	ISF	TRE	SAC	PHX		4th	1,154.8
1960	TRE	INDY; 1	MIL; DNQ	LAN	SPR	MIL; 18	DUQ	SYR	ISF	TRE; 21	SAC	PHX			4th	1,000
1961	TRE; DNQ	INDY; 30	MIL; DNQ	LAN	MIL	SPR	DUQ	SYR; DNQ	ISF	TRE	SAC	PHX			-	0
1962	TRE	INDY; 9	MIL	LAN	TRE	SPR	MIL	LAN	SYR	ISF	TRE	SAC	PHX		19th	200
1963	TRE	INDY; 24	MIL	LAN	TRE	SPR	MIL	DUQ	ISF	TRE	SAC	PHX			-	0

=== Indianapolis 500 results ===
Year	Car	Start	Qual	Rank	Finish	Laps	Led	Retired
1949	68	21	126.516	29	11	175	0	Flagged
1950	76	28	129.959	24	24	122	0	Flagged
1952	59	10	136.343	7	2nd	200	0	Running
1953	2	25	135.666	28	7	200	1	Running
1954	38	28	138.228	21	28	110	0	Crash T4
1955	33	20	138.707	24	14	191	0	Flagged
1956	24	2	145.120	3	20	175	3	Rings
1957	26	32	139.806	31	2nd	200	24	Running
1958	2	20	143.147	15	5	200	0	Running
1959	16	3	144.433	4	2nd	200	19	Running
1960	4	2	146.371	4	1st	200	100	Running
1961	4	11	145.413	13	30	48	6	Magneto
1962	44	23	146.610	21	9	200	0	Running
1963	16	29	147.838	32	24	99	0	Magneto
Totals						2320	153	

Starts	14
Poles	0
Front Row	3
Wins	1
Top 5	5
Top 10	7
Retired	4

=== FIA World Drivers' Championship results ===
(key) (Races in italics indicate fastest lap)

Year	Entrant	Chassis	Engine	1	2	3	4	5	6	7	8	9	10	11	WDC	Points
1950	Pioneer Auto Repair	Wetteroth	Offenhauser L4	GBR	MON	500; 24	SUI	BEL	FRA	ITA					NC	0
1952	Grancor-Wynn's Oil	Kurtis Kraft 3000	Offenhauser L4	SUI	500; 2	BEL	FRA	GBR	GER	NED	ITA				10th	6
1953	Travelon Trailer	Kurtis Kraft 500B	Offenhauser L4	ARG	500; 7	NED	BEL	FRA	GBR	GER	SUI	ITA			NC	0
1954	Bardahl	Kurtis Kraft 500C	Offenhauser L4	ARG	500; 28	BEL	FRA	GBR	GER	SUI	ITA	ESP			NC	0
1955	Belond Miracle Power	Epperly	Offenhauser L4	ARG	MON	500; 14	BEL	NED	GBR	ITA					NC	0
1956	Hopkins	Kurtis Kraft 500C	Offenhauser L4	ARG	MON	500; 20	BEL	FRA	GBR	GER	ITA				NC	0
1957	Chiropractic	Epperly Indy Roadster	Offenhauser L4	ARG	MON	500; 2	FRA	GBR	GER	PES	ITA				10th	7
1958	Leader Card 500 Roadster	Epperly Indy Roadster	Offenhauser L4	ARG	MON	NED	500; 5	BEL	FRA	GBR	GER	POR	ITA	MOR	21st	2
1959	Simoniz	Watson Indy Roadster	Offenhauser L4	MON	500; 2	NED	FRA	GBR	GER	POR	ITA	USA			11th	6
1960	Ken-Paul	Watson Indy Roadster	Offenhauser L4	ARG	MON	500; 1	NED	BEL	FRA	GBR	POR	ITA	USA		8th	8

Preceded by Rodger Ward	Indianapolis 500 Winner; 1960	Succeeded by A. J. Foyt
