= Wayne Weiler =

American racing driver (1934–2005)

- Born: Wayne Alois Weiler; December 9, 1934 Phoenix, Arizona, U.S.
- Died: October 13, 2005 (aged 70) Phoenix, Arizona, U.S.

Champ Car career
- 19 races run over 4 years
- Years active: 1958–1961
- Best finish: 13th – 1960
- First race: 1958 Golden State 100 (Sacramento)
- Last race: 1961 Rex Mays Classic (Milwaukee)
Wins	Podiums	Poles
0	1	1

Formula One World Championship career
- Active years: 1960
- Team: Epperly
- Entries: 1
- Championships: 0
- Wins: 0
- Podiums: 0
- Career points: 0
- Pole positions: 0
- Fastest laps: 0
- First entry: 1960 Indianapolis 500

Wayne Alois Weiler (December 9, 1934 in Phoenix, Arizona – October 13, 2005 in Phoenix, Arizona) was an American racecar driver.

Weiler started as a dirt track driver in Arizona in 1951. He drove in the USAC Championship Car series from 1958 to 1961 with 19 starts. He finished in the top-ten ten times, with his best finish in third position, in 1960 at Phoenix.

Weiler competed in the Indianapolis 500 race in 1960 and 1961, with a best finish of 15th in 1961.

Weiler suffered a severe accident in a USAC sprint car race in Terre Haute, Indiana on June 11, 1961. Despite many erroneous reports stating the accident ended his career, he returned to race, just not nationally or in USAC any longer. He raced primarily in Arizona and in midgets, from the late 1960s through 1973. He remained active as an owner and manager in auto racing up until his death.

Weiler died at age 70 from a heart attack.

== Indy 500 results ==
Year	Car	Start	Qual	Rank	Finish	Laps	Led	Retired
1960	32	15	143.512	20	24	103	0	Crash T2
1961	15	12	145.349	14	15	147	0	Wheel Bearing
Totals						250	0	

Starts	2
Poles	0
Front Row	0
Wins	0
Top 5	0
Top 10	0
Retired	2

== World Championship career summary ==
The Indianapolis 500 was part of the FIA World Championship from 1950 through 1960. Drivers competing at Indy during those years were credited with World Championship points and participation. Wayne Weiler participated in one World Championship race but scored no World Championship points.
