= Chuck Stevenson =

American racing driver (1919–1995)

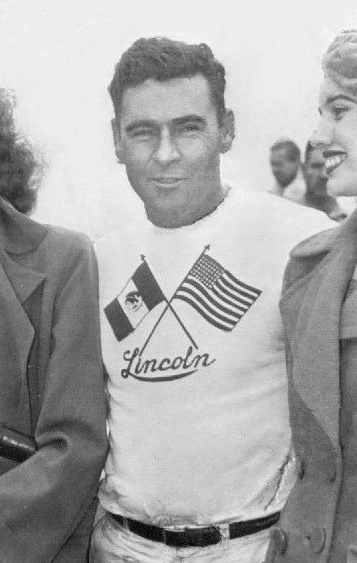
- Stevenson in 1952
- Born: Charles Joseph Stevenson; October 15, 1919 Sidney, Montana, U.S.
- Died: August 21, 1995 (aged 75) Benson, Arizona, U.S.

Championship titles
- AAA Championship Car (1952)

Champ Car career
- 53 races run over 15 years
- Best finish: 1st (1952)
- First race: 1949 Milwaukee 200 (Milwaukee)
- Last race: 1965 Indianapolis 500 (Indianapolis)
- First win: 1952 Milwaukee 200 (Milwaukee)
- Last win: 1954 Rex Mays Classic (Milwaukee)
Wins	Podiums	Poles
4	12	3

NASCAR Cup Series career
- 2 races run over 2 years
- Best finish: 94th (1956)
- First race: 1955 LeHi 300 (Lehi)
- Last race: 1956 Race 3 (Willow Springs)
- First win: 1956 Race 3 (Willow Springs)
Wins	Top tens	Poles
1	1	0

Formula One World Championship career
- Active years: 1951 – 1954, 1960
- Team(s): Marchese, Kurtis Kraft, Kuzma, Watson
- Entries: 5
- Championships: 0
- Wins: 0
- Podiums: 0
- Career points: 0
- Pole positions: 0
- Fastest laps: 0
- First entry: 1951 Indianapolis 500
- Last entry: 1960 Indianapolis 500

Charles Joseph Stevenson (October 15, 1919 – August 21, 1995) was an American racing driver who competed in various disciplines of motorsport. He is best known for winning the AAA National Championship in 1952. Stevenson also had two class victories in the Carrera Panamericana and won a NASCAR Grand National event.

== Early life ==
Charles Joseph Stevenson was born in Sidney, Montana on October 15, 1919, to Joseph Charles, a rancher, and Blanche (née Williams). The family later relocated to Fresno, California.

== Championship Car career ==
Stevenson drove in the AAA and USAC Championship Car series, racing in the 1949–1954, 1960–1961, and 1963–1965 seasons with 54 starts, including the Indianapolis 500 races in 1951–1954, 1960–1961, and 1963–1965. He finished in the top-ten 37 times, with four victories, two of them coming during the 1952 season when he won the AAA National Championship.

== Non-Championship Car career ==
=== Carrera Panamericana ===
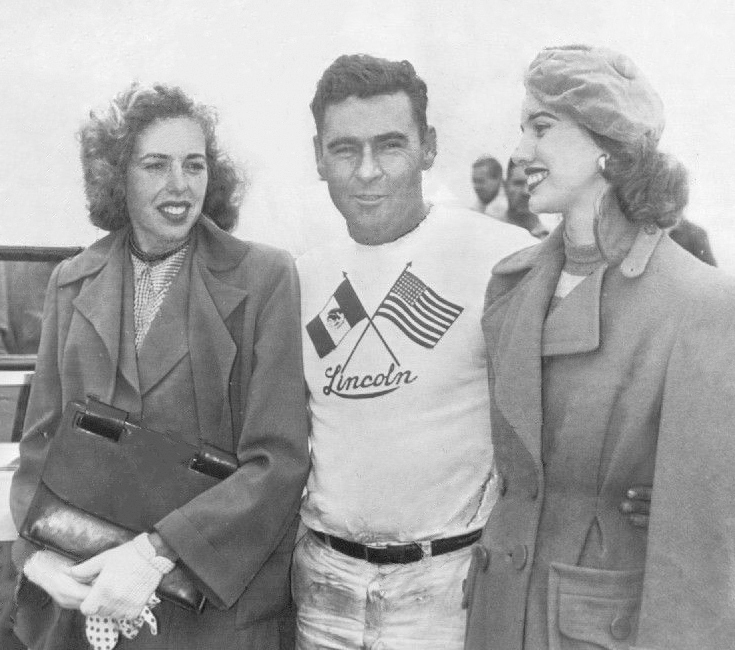
Stevenson after his class victory in the 1952 Carrera Panamericana

In 1951, Stevenson drove a Nash-Healey course (pace) car that was supplied by the Mexican Nash automobile importer in the grueling 2,000-mile (3,219 km) Carrera Panamericana race. This endurance event is described as one of the most dangerous automobile races of any type in the world, and Stevenson had to be ahead of the racers to ensure the way was clear. In both 1952 and 1953, Stevenson won the sedan class driving a "well-prepared" Lincoln Capri. He is the only two-time winner in the history of the Carrera Panamericana.

=== Stock car career ===
Stevenson participated in no less than 40 AAA and USAC Stock Car events, finishing in the top-five no less than 14 times.

Stevenson also competed in two NASCAR events, picking up a win at Willow Springs Raceway in 1956 driving a Ford.

=== World Drivers' Championship career ===
The AAA/USAC-sanctioned Indianapolis 500 was included in the FIA World Drivers' Championship from 1950 through 1960. Drivers competing at Indianapolis during those years were credited with World Drivers' Championship points and participation in addition to those which they received towards the AAA/USAC National Championship.

Stevenson participated in five World Drivers' Championship races at Indianapolis. His best finish was a 12th place, and he accumulated zero World Drivers' Championship points.

== Later life ==
Stevenson died in Benson, Arizona on August 21, 1995.

== Awards and honors ==
Stevenson has been inducted into the following halls of fame:

- Fresno Athletic Hall of Fame (1963)
- West Coast Stock Car/Motorsports Hall of Fame (2011)
- National Midget Auto Racing Hall of Fame

== Motorsports career results ==
=== AAA/USAC Championship Car results ===
Year	1	2	3	4	5	6	7	8	9	10	11	12	13	14	15	16	17	18	19	20	21	22	23	24	25	26	27	28	Pos	Points
1949	ARL	INDY	MIL	TRE	SPR	MIL; 14	DUQ	PIK	SYR	DET	SPR; 4	LAN	SAC	DMR															34th	120
1950	INDY	MIL; DNS	LAN; 3	SPR; DNQ	MIL; 20	PIK	SYR	DET; 6	SPR; 3	SAC; 4	PHX; 4	BAY; 19	DAR; 6																8th	760
1951	INDY; 20	MIL; DNQ	LAN	DAR; 9	SPR; 5	MIL; 6	DUQ; 10	DUQ; 4	PIK	SYR; 9	DET	DNC; DNP	SJS	PHX	BAY														14th	538
1952	INDY; 18	MIL; 6	RAL; 6	SPR; 5	MIL; 1	DET; 3	DUQ; 1	PIK	SYR; 7	DNC; 2	SJS; 7	PHX; 6																	1st	1,440
1953	INDY; 29	MIL; 15	SPR; 6	DET; DNQ	SPR; 3	MIL; 1	DUQ; 9	PIK	SYR; 18	ISF; DNQ	SAC; 9	PHX																	8th	745
1954	INDY; 12	MIL; 1	LAN	DAR; 29	SPR; 2	MIL; 2	DUQ; 2	PIK	SYR	ISF	SAC	PHX	LVG																7th	861.5
1960	TRE	INDY; 15	MIL; 20	LAN; DNQ	SPR; 6	MIL; 24	DUQ; 17	SYR; DNP	ISF; 8	TRE	SAC	PHX																	29th	130
1961	TRE	INDY; 6	MIL	LAN	MIL	SPR	DUQ	SYR	ISF	TRE	SAC	PHX																	14th	400
1962	TRE	INDY; DNQ	MIL	LAN	TRE	SPR	MIL	LAN	SYR	ISF	TRE	SAC	PHX																-	0
1963	TRE	INDY; 21	MIL; DNQ	LAN	TRE	SPR	MIL	DUQ	ISF	TRE	SAC	PHX																	-	0
1964	PHX; DNQ	TRE	INDY; 28	MIL; 6	LAN	TRE	SPR	MIL	DUQ	ISF	TRE	SAC	PHX																35th	80
1965	PHX	TRE	INDY; 25	MIL; DNQ	LAN; DNQ	PIP	TRE	IRP	ATL	LAN	MIL	SPR	MIL	DUQ	ISF	TRE	SAC	PHX											-	0
1966	PHX	TRE	INDY; DNQ	MIL	LAN	ATL	PIP	IRP	LAN	SPR	MIL	DUQ	ISF	TRE	SAC	PHX													-	0
1967	PHX	TRE	INDY; DNQ	MIL	LAN	PIP	MOS	MOS	IRP	LAN	MTR	MTR	SPR	MIL	DUQ	ISF	TRE	SAC	HAN	PHX	RIV								-	0
1968	HAN	LVG	PHX	TRE	INDY; DNQ	MIL	MOS	MOS	LAN	PIP	CDR	NAZ	IRP	IRP	LAN	LAN	MTR	MTR	SPR	MIL	DUQ	ISF	TRE	SAC	MCH	HAN	PHX	RIV	-	0

=== Indianapolis 500 results ===
Year	Car	Start	Qual	Rank	Finish	Laps	Led	Retired
1951	8	19	133.764	14	20	93	0	Engine
1952	16	11	136.142	9	18	187	0	Flagged
1953	97	16	136.560	14	29	42	0	Fuel Leak
1954	98	5	138.776	13	12	199	0	Flagged
1960	65	9	144.665	12	15	196	0	Flagged
1961	18	28	145.191	16	6	200	0	Running
1963	45	22	148.386	23	21	110	0	Valve
1964	95	29	150.830	29	28	2	0	Crash FS
1965	88	26	154.275	30	25	50	0	Piston
Totals						1079	0	

Starts	9
Poles	0
Front Row	0
Wins	0
Top 5	0
Top 10	1
Retired	5
