= Epner (surname) =

Epner is a surname. Notable people with the surname include:

- Eero Epner (born 1978), Estonian art historian and playwright
- Johan Epner (1893–?), Estonian politician

== See also ==
- Epper (surname)
