= Jim Packard =

American racing driver (1931–1960)

- Born: James Russell Packard, Jr. July 23, 1931 Hendersonville, North Carolina, U.S.
- Died: October 1, 1960 (aged 29) Fairfield, Illinois, U.S.

Champ Car career
- 22 races run over 3 years
- Years active: 1958–1960
- Best finish: 10th – 1960
- First race: 1958 Springfield 100 (Springfield)
- Last race: 1960 Trenton 100 (Trenton)
- First win: 1960 Springfield 100 (Springfield)
Wins	Podiums	Poles
1	2	0

James Russell Packard Jr. (September 23, 1931 – October 1, 1960) was a racing driver from Hendersonville, North Carolina who competed in the USAC Championship Car series. He made 22 starts and registered a single win in August 1960 at the Illinois State Fairgrounds Racetrack, however he was killed in an accident during a midget race in Fairfield, Illinois on October 1 of that year. He attempted to qualify for the Indianapolis 500 in 1959 and 1960, but wrecked his car in practice in 1959 and failed to make the field the following year.

== Complete USAC Championship Car results ==
Year	1	2	3	4	5	6	7	8	9	10	11	12	13	Pos	Points
1958	TRE	INDY	MIL	LAN	ATL	SPR; 14	MIL; DNQ	DUQ; 12	SYR; DNQ	ISF; 12	TRE; DNQ	SAC; 7	PHX; DNQ	29th	80
1959	DAY; 10	TRE; 11	INDY; DNQ	MIL; 14	LAN; 11	SPR; 13	MIL; 20	DUQ; DNQ	SYR; 15	ISF; 18	TRE; 21	SAC; 8	PHX; DNQ	37th	120
1960	TRE; 6	INDY; DNQ	MIL; DNQ	LAN; 2	SPR; 1	MIL; 6	DUQ; 5	SYR; 13	ISF; 18	TRE; 20	SAC	PHX		10th	700
