= Epperly, West Virginia =

Unincorporated community in West Virginia, United States

Epperly
- Unincorporated community
- Location within the state of West Virginia Epperly (the United States)
- Coordinates: 37°40′20″N 81°14′31″W
- Country: United States
- State: West Virginia
- County: Raleigh
- Elevation: 2,470 ft (750 m)
- Time zone: UTC-5 (Eastern (EST))
  - Summer (DST): UTC-4 (EDT)
- GNIS ID: 1554408

Epperly is an unincorporated community located in Raleigh County, West Virginia.
