= Epper (surname) =

Epper is a surname. Notable people with the surname include:

- Gary Epper (1944–2007), American stunt performer
- Jeannie Epper (1941–2024), American stunt performer and actress
- Tony Epper (1938–2012), American actor and stunt performer

== See also ==
- Epner (surname)
- Esper (name)
