= Al Herman =

American racing driver

- Born: March 15, 1926
- Died: June 18, 1960 (aged 33)

Formula One World Championship career
- Nationality: (United States) American
- Active years: 1953–1960
- Team(s): Kuzma, Kurtis Kraft, Ewing, Dunn
- Entries: 8 (5 starts)
- Championships: 0
- Wins: 0
- Podiums: 0
- Career points: 0
- Pole positions: 0
- Fastest laps: 0
- First entry: 1953 Indianapolis 500
- Last entry: 1960 Indianapolis 500

Homer Gerald "Al" Herman (March 15, 1926 – June 18, 1960) was an American racecar driver.

== Biography ==
Born in Topton, Pennsylvania, Herman died in West Haven, Connecticut as a result of injuries sustained in a midget car crash at the West Haven Speedway. Herman was involved in a multi-car crash on the first lap of the feature race and his car rolled. He drove in the American Automobile Association (AAA) and United States Automobile Club (USAC) Championship Car series, racing in the 1955-1957 and 1959–1960 seasons with 11 starts, including the Indianapolis 500 races in each of those years. He finished in the top ten 3 times, with his best finish in 7th position, in the 1955 Indianapolis 500, earning him Rookie of the Year.

Herman married June C. Hereth. He lived in Kuhnsville, Pennsylvania. He was buried in Ziegels Union Cemetery in Breinigsville, Pennsylvania.

== Indianapolis 500 results ==
Year	Car	Start	Qual	Rank	Finish	Laps	Led	Retired
1955	71	16	139.811	15	7	200	0	Running
1956	12	27	141.610	23	28	74	0	Crash FS
1957	89	30	140.007	29	21	111	0	Crash FS
1959	89	23	141.939	29	13	200	0	Running
1960	76	30	141.838	31	32	34	0	Clutch
Totals						619	0	

Starts	5
Poles	0
Front Row	0
Wins	0
Top 5	0
Top 10	1
Retired	3

== World Championship career summary ==
The Indianapolis 500 was part of the FIA World Championship from 1950 through 1960. Drivers competing at Indy during those years were credited with World Championship points and participation. Herman participated in five World Championship races. He started on the pole 0 times, won 0 races, set 0 fastest laps, and finished on the podium 0 times. He accumulated a total of 0 championship points.

Sporting positions
Preceded by Larry Crockett	Indianapolis 500; Rookie of the Year; 1955	Succeeded by Bob Veith
