= Dempsey Wilson =

American racecar driver (1927–1971)

- Born: March 11, 1927
- Died: April 23, 1971 (aged 44)

Formula One World Championship career
- Nationality: (United States) American
- Active years: 1956–1960
- Team(s): Kuzma, Kurtis Kraft, Silnes
- Entries: 5 (2 starts)
- Championships: 0
- Wins: 0
- Podiums: 0
- Career points: 0
- Pole positions: 0
- Fastest laps: 0
- First entry: 1956 Indianapolis 500
- Last entry: 1960 Indianapolis 500

Dempsey Cothrien Wilson (March 11, 1927 – April 23, 1971) was an American racecar driver.

Wilson was born in Los Angeles, California. He began his racing career on Southern California short tracks, racing roadsters, then midgets and stock cars. He drove in the USAC Championship Car series, racing in the 1956, 1958–1965, and 1968–1969 seasons with 32 starts, including the Indianapolis 500 races in 1958, 1960, 1961, and 1963. He finished in the top-ten four times, with his best finish in eighth position in 1960 at Milwaukee. Outside of racing, Wilson owned a business called "Dempsey Wilson Racing Cams," which refurbished camshafts. He died in Duarte, California, at City of Hope after a long battle with mesothelioma.

== Indianapolis 500 results ==
Year	Car	Start	Qual	Rank	Finish	Laps	Led	Retired
1958	59	32	143.272	13	15	151	0	Clutch pedal
1960	23	33	143.215	24	33	11	0	Magneto
1961	35	31	144.202	31	16	145	0	Fuel Pump
1963	29	30	147.832	33	11	200	0	Running
Totals						507	0	

Starts	4
Poles	0
Front Row	0
Wins	0
Top 5	0
Top 10	0
Retired	3

== World Championship career summary ==
The Indianapolis 500 was part of the FIA World Championship from 1950 through 1960. Drivers competing at Indy during those years were credited with World Championship points and participation. Wilson participated in two World Championship races but scored no World Championship points.
