= Dunn Engineering =

American auto racing team

Dunn Engineering was an auto racing team which participated in Championship car racing from 1956 through 1964. The team was owned by engineer Harold Dunn, and based in Detroit, Michigan.

Their participation in the Indianapolis 500 during the second half of the 1950s took place while the race was part of the FIA World Drivers' Championship. Dunn chassis were powered by Offenhauser engines, and were driven by Pat Flaherty, Al Keller, Chuck Weyant and Al Herman. The team's best result at Indianapolis was tenth in 1955.

The team's last notable result came at the Milwaukee Mile, during the 1963 Rex Mays Classic. Unheralded driver Jack Conely drove the Dunn car from the rear of the field to the front twice, after spinning out multiple times.
