= Johnny Boyd =

American racing driver (1926–2003)

- Born: John Gibson Boyd; August 19, 1926 Fresno, California, U.S.
- Died: October 26, 2003 (aged 77) Fresno, California, U.S.

Champ Car career
- 55 races run over 15 years
- Years active: 1952, 1954–1967
- Best finish: 6th – 1956
- First race: 1954 Langhorne 100 (Langhorne)
- Last race: 1966 Hoosier Grand Prix (IRP)
Wins	Podiums	Poles
0	5	3

Formula One World Championship career
- Active years: 1955–1960
- Team(s): Kurtis Kraft, Epperly
- Entries: 6
- Championships: 0
- Wins: 0
- Podiums: 1
- Career points: 4
- Pole positions: 0
- Fastest laps: 0
- First entry: 1955 Indianapolis 500
- Last entry: 1960 Indianapolis 500

Johnny Boyd (August 19, 1926 – October 26, 2003) was an American racecar driver.

== Racing career ==
Born in Fresno, California, Boyd drove in the AAA and USAC Championship Car series from 1954 to 1966 with 56 starts. He finished in the top-ten 31 times, with his best finish in second position, in 1959 at Milwaukee.

Boyd qualified for the Indianapolis 500 for the first time in 1955 but finished 29th after being involved in an accident that killed driver Bill Vukovich. In a dozen starts, his best race was in 1958, when he led 18 laps and finished 3rd. In total, he finished in the top-ten at the 500 five times.

After 1949, Boyd had become close friends with Bob Sweikert of Hayward, California when he met him on the California racing circuit. The two often raced together, and Boyd qualified for entry in the 1955 Indianapolis 500 when Sweikert helped him overcome mechanical handling problems in Boyd's car. Sweikert won the race that day, but was overshadowed by the death of Vukovich. Boyd also raced against Sweikert in 1956 at Indy, but Sweikert was killed several weeks later in a Sprint car race.

Boyd retired as a driver after failing to qualify for the Indy 500 and Milwaukee race in 1967. He died of cancer at age 77 in his hometown of Fresno.

== Awards ==
In 1966, Boyd was inducted into the Fresno County Athletic Hall of Fame. He was named to the National Midget Auto Racing Hall of Fame in 2010.

== Indianapolis 500 results ==
Year	Car	Start	Qual	Rank	Finish	Laps	Led	Retired
1955	39	26	136.981	26	29	53	0	Crash BS
1956	15	12	142.337	19	30	35	0	Engine trouble
1957	6	5	142.102	10	6	200	0	Running
1958	9	8	144.023	9	3	200	18	Running
1959	33	11	142.812	16	6	200	0	Running
1960	8	13	143.770	18	27	77	0	Piston
1961	41	20	144.092	32	21	105	0	Clutch
1962	38	28	147.047	14	10	200	0	Running
1963	23	27	148.038	29	32	12	0	Oil Leak
1964	88	13	151.835	18	5	200	0	Running
1965	14	29	155.172	19	13	140	0	Gearbox
1966	28	14	159.384	21	22	5	0	Crash T1
Totals						1427	18	

Starts	12
Poles	0
Front Row	0
Wins	0
Top 5	2
Top 10	5
Retired	7

== Complete Formula One World Championship results ==
(key)

Year	Entrant	Chassis	Engine	1	2	3	4	5	6	7	8	9	10	11	WDC	Points
1955	Sumar / Chapman Root	Kurtis Kraft 500D	Offenhauser L4	ARG	MON	500; 29	BEL	NED	GBR	ITA					NC	0
1956	Bowes Seal Fast / Bignotti	Kurtis Kraft 500E	Offenhauser L4	ARG	MON	500; 30	BEL	FRA	GBR	GER	ITA				NC	0
1957	Bowes Seal Fast / Bignotti	Kurtis Kraft 500G	Offenhauser L4	ARG	MON	500; 6	FRA	GBR	GER	PES	ITA				NC	0
1958	Bowes Seal Fast Racing	Kurtis Kraft 500G	Offenhauser L4	ARG	MON	NED	500; 3	BEL	FRA	GBR	GER	POR	ITA	MOR	16th	4
1959	Bowes Seal Fast / Bignotti	Epperly Indy Roadster	Offenhauser L4	MON	500; 6	NED	FRA	GBR	GER	POR	ITA	USA			NC	0
1960	Bowes Seal Fast Racing	Epperly Indy Roadster	Offenhauser L4	ARG	MON	500; 27	NED	BEL	FRA	GBR	POR	ITA	USA		NC	0
