= Chuck Weyant =

American racecar driver (1923–2017)

- Born: April 3, 1923; St. Mary's, Ohio, U.S.
- Died: January 23, 2017 (aged 93)

Formula One World Championship career
- Nationality: (United States) American
- Active years: 1952, 1954–1955, 1957–1959
- Team(s): Kurtis Kraft, Kuzma, Dunn, Silnes, Koehnle
- Entries: 6 (4 starts)
- Championships: 0
- Wins: 0
- Podiums: 0
- Career points: 0
- Pole positions: 0
- Fastest laps: 0
- First entry: 1955 Indianapolis 500
- Last entry: 1959 Indianapolis 500

Chuck Weyant (April 3, 1923 – January 23, 2017) was an American racecar driver. He was born in St. Mary's, Ohio.

Until his death, Weyant was the oldest living Indianapolis 500 veteran. He died on January 24, 2017, at the age of 93.

== Midget cars ==
Weyant came from a racing family. He started out racing against his brother and father in the early 1940s before the US joined World War II. He had his first win in 1947 after the war. Weyant won track titles at Charleston and Belleville, Illinois. The finished in the top 25 in the National points battle nine times between 1951 and 1971. He won at least 64 feature events, including 13 National events. One of his greatest victories was the 1955 Hut Hundred at the Terre Haute Action Track.

== Championship cars ==
Weyant raced in the AAA and USAC Championship Car series in the 1952–1959 seasons, with 21 career starts, including the 1955 and 1957-1959 Indianapolis 500 races. He finished in the top-ten five times, with his best finish in eighth position in 1954 at Las Vegas and in 1959 at Milwaukee.

== Career awards ==
- Weyant was inducted in the National Midget Auto Racing Hall of Fame.

== Indianapolis 500 results ==
Year	Car	Start	Qual	Rank	Finish	Laps	Led	Retired
1955	41	25	138.063	25	12	196	0	Flagged
1957	82	25	141.105	18	14	196	0	Flagged
1958	89	29	142.608	29	24	38	0	Crash T4
1959	47	29	141.950	28	28	45	0	Crash T3
Totals						475	0	

Starts	4
Poles	0
Front Row	0
Wins	0
Top 5	0
Top 10	0
Retired	2

== World Championship career summary ==
The Indianapolis 500 was part of the FIA World Championship from 1950 through 1960. Drivers competing at Indy during those years were credited with World Championship points and participation. Weyant participated in four World Championship races but scored no World Championship points.
