= Jim McWithey =

American racing driver

- Born: July 4, 1927
- Died: February 1, 2009 (aged 81)

Formula One World Championship career
- Nationality: (United States) American
- Active years: 1956-1960
- Team(s): Kurtis Kraft, Epperly, Snowberger, Schroeder
- Entries: 5 (2 starts)
- Championships: 0
- Wins: 0
- Podiums: 0
- Career points: 0
- Pole positions: 0
- Fastest laps: 0
- First entry: 1956 Indianapolis 500
- Last entry: 1960 Indianapolis 500

James Robert McWithey (July 4, 1927 – February 1, 2009) was an American racecar driver. He was born in Grammer, Indiana.

McWithey raced in the USAC Championship Car series in the 1956, 1957, 1959 and 1960 seasons, with 20 career starts, including the 1959 and 1960 Indianapolis 500 races. He finished in the top-ten nine times, with his best finish in third position in 1960 at Trenton. His best season was 1959, when he placed fourth three times and also won dirt track sprint car features at Terre Haute, and Williams Grove. He died in February 2009 in Gainesville, Georgia, aged 81.

== Indy 500 results ==
Year	Car	Start	Qual	Ranking	Finish	Laps	Led	Retired
1959	58	33	141.215	33	16	200	0	Running
1960	16	32	140.378	33	29	60	0	Brakes
Totals						260	0	

Starts	2
Poles	0
Front Row	0
Wins	0
Top 5	0
Top 10	0
Retired	1

== Complete Formula One World Championship results ==
(key)

Year	Entrant	Chassis	Engine	1	2	3	4	5	6	7	8	9	10	WDC	Points
1959	Ray Brady	Kurtis-Kraft	Offenhauser	MON	500; 16	NED	FRA	GBR	GER	POR	ITA	USA		NC	0
1960	Hoover Motor Express	Epperly	Offenhauser	ARG	MON	500; 29	NED	BEL	FRA	GBR	POR	ITA	USA	NC	0
