= Quin Epperly =

American auto racing builder (1913–2001)

- Born: Quincy David Epperly; March 3, 1913; Floyd, Virginia, U.S.
- Died: January 7, 2001 (aged 87); San Luis Obispo, California, U.S.
- Occupation: Auto racing builder

Quincy David Epperly (March 3, 1913 – January 7, 2001) was an American race car builder. He was known for constructing roadsters in the 'lay down' style first pioneered by George Salih.

== Biography ==
Epperly was born in Floyd, Virginia, to John Wesley and Iowa Texas Epperly. After completing a correspondence course in "Theory of Aircraft Construction", Epperly moved to Southern California in 1940 to work for Lockheed and Pacific Airmotive. During the Second World War, he joined the Coast Guard Reserve to spend evenings after work on watch at the Wilmington Coast Guard Patrol Base.

=== Indy car racing ===
In the late 1940s, Epperly went to work for Frank Kurtis building racing car bodies; this led to a lifelong career in the racing business.

During the mid-1950s, Epperly opened his own shop in Lawndale, California, and in 1957 he assisted chassis designer George Salih in the construction of a radical approach in racing car design which placed a four-cylinder Offenhauser engine on its side, rather than in the upright position, as was the usual custom for the Indianapolis roadsters of that era. Called the "lay down Offy," it allowed for better high-speed aerodynamics and oval-track weight distribution.

Salih had expended almost all of his finances in designing and constructing the chassis framework. In exchange for a large discount on fabricating the bodywork for Salih's design, Epperly was allowed to construct and sell his own variants of the lay-down design. While Salih would only have two chassis built to his designs, Epperly's lay-down chassis would be common at Indianapolis from 1958 onwards.

Epperly's cars competed in five FIA World Championship races - the 1955, 1957, 1958, 1959 and 1960 Indianapolis 500; he performed bodywork on the race winner in 1957 and 1958.

=== Drag racing ===
Epperly also built the body for the first Spirit of America land speed racer, out of his shop in Gardena, California.

Epperly worked with Nye Frank and Craig Breedlove on the dragster Spirit II in 1964, and with Frank on the Flying Wedge streamliner dragster built for Don Prudhomme in 1971.

== Later work ==
A notable restoration by Epperly was the engine for the Cooper Type 54-Climax, which, in the hands of Jack Brabham, began the "rear engine revolution" at Indianapolis. The restoration earned the car the coveted Monterey Cup at the 1991 Monterey Historic races, when, driven again by Brabham, it performed perfectly. It later traveled to the Festival of Speed at Goodwood in 1993, to Australia in 1995 for the CART Surfer's Paradise race, to Michigan International Raceway in 1996 for the U.S. 500 (where demonstration laps at around 140 mph were made), and to the California Speedway in 1997 for the Marlboro 500.

Epperly's last major project was to complete the body restoration of his own Demler Special #99 in 1998. The Demler had finished second in the 1958 Indianapolis 500.

== Select Indianapolis 500 results ==
Season	Driver	Grid	Classification	Points	Note	Race Report
1955	Jim Rathmann	20	14			Report
1957	Jim Rathmann	32	2	7		Report
1958	George Amick	25	2	6		Report
1958	Tony Bettenhausen	9	4	4		Report
1958	Jim Rathmann	20	5	2		Report
1959	Tony Bettenhausen	15	4	3		Report
1959	Paul Goldsmith	16	5	2		Report
1959	Johnny Boyd	11	6			Report
1960	Paul Goldsmith	26	3	4		Report
1960	Red Amick	22	11			Report
1960	Wayne Weiler	15	24		Accident	Report
1960	Johnny Boyd	13	27		Engine	Report
1960	Wayne Weiler	15	24		Accident	Report
1960	A. J. Foyt	16	25		Epperly modified Kurtis Chassis-Clutch	Report
1960	Jim McWithey	32	29		Brakes	Report
