= A. J. Watson =

American auto racing builder

- Born: Abraham Jacob Watson; May 8, 1924; Mansfield, Ohio, U.S.
- Died: May 12, 2014 (aged 90); Indianapolis, Indiana, U.S.
- Occupations: Auto racing builder Auto racing mechanic

Abraham Jacob Watson (May 8, 1924 – May 12, 2014) was an American race car builder and chief mechanic. Competing from 1949 through 1984 in the Indianapolis 500, he won the race six times as a car builder. Rodger Ward won 18 races driving Watson cars.

== Biography ==
=== Early life ===
Watson was born in Mansfield, Ohio. He served in the United States Army Air Forces during the Second World War, training as a B-17 navigator. He would not see deployment before the war's end.

=== Motorsports career ===
Resettling in southern California, Watson came to Indianapolis in 1948 but missed the race. He returned the following year with a home-built car that failed to qualify. For the next 11 years, his cars not only qualified but were leaders in many years.

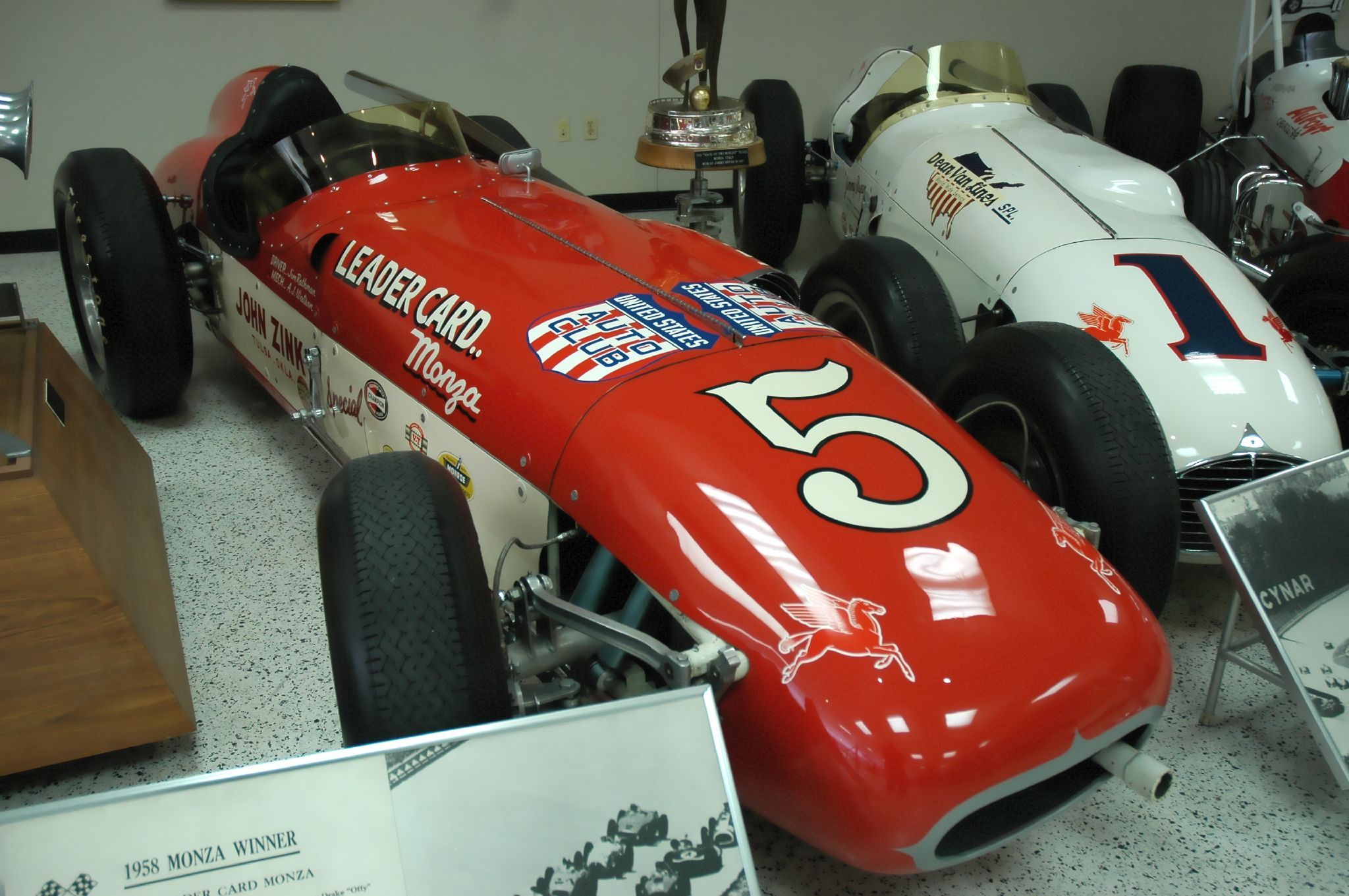
A 1958 Watson-Offenhauser which won the Race of Two Worlds in Monza, Italy

From 1955 to 1958, Watson was associated with the John Zink team, and from 1959 on with Bob Wilke. Watson's first win as a car builder came in 1956 when Pat Flaherty drove the John Zink entry to victory in that year's Indianapolis 500. Watson had won the previous year as a crew chief for Bob Sweikert. Watson's cars dominated the race through 1964. Although he continued entering cars for another two decades, he was never able to regain the commanding position of his heyday.

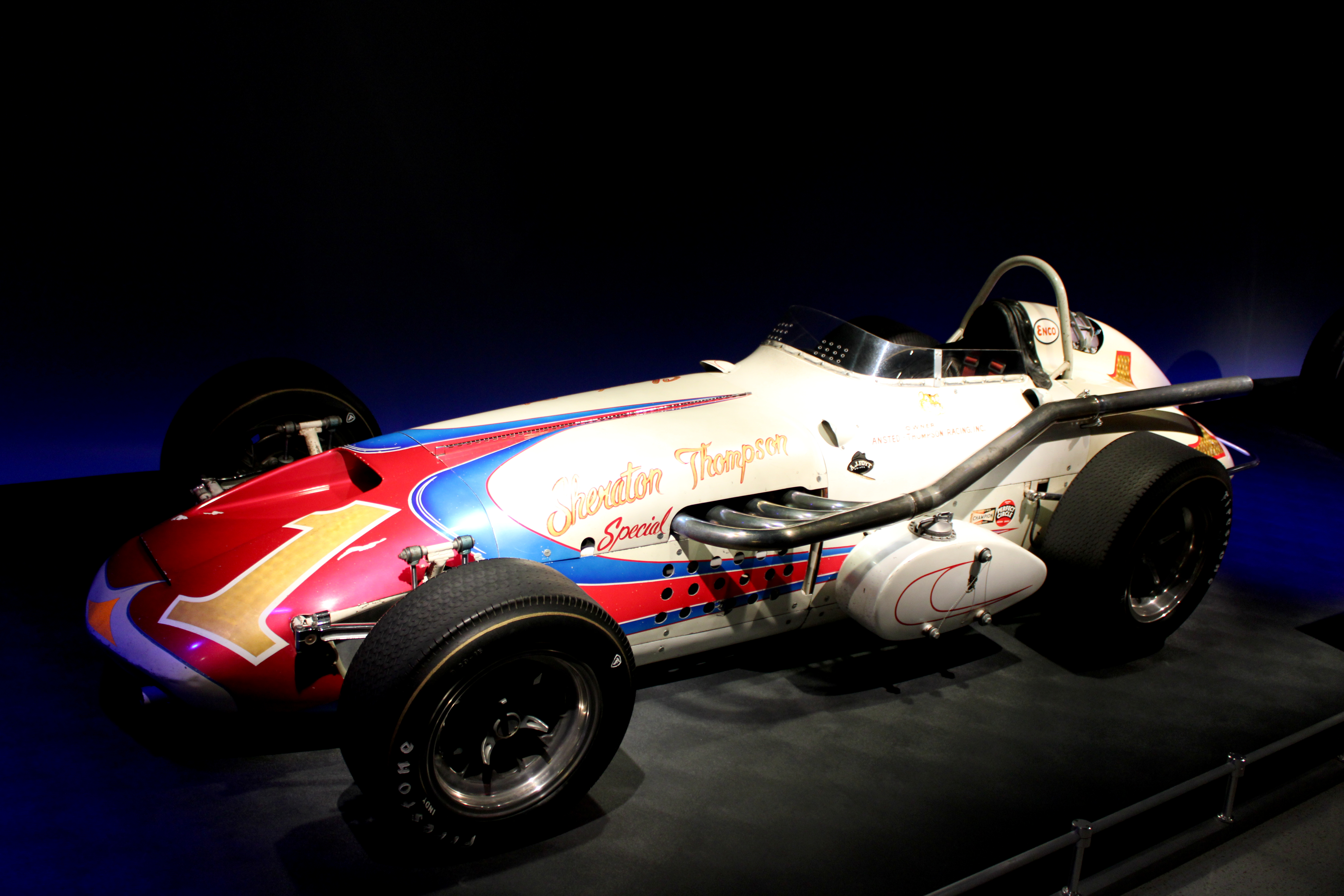
Image of the winning car of the 1964 Indianapolis 500 (A.J. Foyt)

In 1964, with many teams following Lotus's example and moving to rear-engined "funny cars", Watson built a pair of vehicles based on Rolla Vollstedt's successful car. These worked reasonably well, but could not reproduce the success Watson had with his front-engined "roadsters". He built monocoque rear-engined cars in 1966 and 1967 with ever-decreasing success.

From 1969 until 1977, Watson ran Eagles and then built a small series of highly derivative new "Watson" cars in 1977, 1978 and again in 1982 based on Lightning and March designs before retiring. He was frequently listed on the Indianapolis 500 entry sheet as the "race strategist" for PDM Racing, though his role with the team was largely honorary.

=== Personal life ===
For many years, Watson and his family would spend the racing season in Indiana, and the off-season in California. Eventually the family located to Speedway, Indiana permanently.

Watson died in Indianapolis, Indiana on May 12, 2014.

== Awards and honors ==
- Watson was inducted in the National Sprint Car Hall of Fame in 1993.
- Watson was inducted in the Motorsports Hall of Fame of America in 1996.
