= 1962 USAC Championship Car season =

Sports season

- USAC National Championship Trail

Season
- Races: 13
- Start date: April 8
- End date: November 18

Awards
- National champion: (United States) Rodger Ward
- Indianapolis 500 winner: (United States) Rodger Ward

The 1962 USAC Championship Car season consisted of 13 races, beginning in Trenton, New Jersey on April 8 and concluding in Phoenix, Arizona on November 18. There was also one non-championship event at Pikes Peak, Colorado. The USAC National Champion and Indianapolis 500 winner was Rodger Ward. Hugh Randall was killed in the first Langhorne 100 at Langhorne Speedway; he was 29 years old.

== Schedule and results ==
Rnd	Date	Race name	Track	Location	Type	Pole position	Winning driver
1	April 8	(United States) Trenton 100	Trenton International Speedway	Trenton, New Jersey	Paved	(United States) Don Davis	(United States) A. J. Foyt
2	May 30	(United States) International 500 Mile Sweepstakes	Indianapolis Motor Speedway	Speedway, Indiana	Paved	(United States) Parnelli Jones	(United States) Rodger Ward
3	June 10	(United States) Rex Mays Classic	Milwaukee Mile	West Allis, Wisconsin	Paved	(United States) A. J. Foyt	(United States) A. J. Foyt
4	July 1	(United States) Langhorne 100	Langhorne Speedway	Langhorne, Pennsylvania	Dirt	(United States) Jim Hurtubise	(United States) A. J. Foyt
NC	July 4	(United States) Pikes Peak Auto Hill Climb	Pikes Peak Highway	Pikes Peak, Colorado	Hill	(United States) Bobby Unser^{A}	(United States) Bobby Unser
5	July 22	(United States) Trenton 150	Trenton International Speedway	Trenton, New Jersey	Paved	(United States) A. J. Foyt	(United States) Rodger Ward
6	August 19	(United States) Tony Bettenhausen Memorial	Illinois State Fairgrounds	Springfield, Illinois	Dirt	(United States) Roger McCluskey	(United States) Jim Hurtubise
7	August 20	(United States) Tony Bettenhausen 200	Milwaukee Mile	West Allis, Wisconsin	Paved	(United States) Bobby Marshman	(United States) Rodger Ward
8	August 26	(United States) Langhorne 100	Langhorne Speedway	Langhorne, Pennsylvania	Dirt	(United States) A. J. Foyt	(United States) Don Branson
-	September 3	(United States) Ted Horn Memorial	DuQuoin State Fairgrounds	Du Quoin, Illinois	Dirt	Cancelled because of rain	
9	September 8	(United States) Syracuse 100	Syracuse Mile	Syracuse, New York	Dirt	(United States) Parnelli Jones	(United States) Rodger Ward
10	September 15	(United States) Hoosier Hundred	Indiana State Fairgrounds	Indianapolis, Indiana	Dirt	(United States) Parnelli Jones	(United States) Parnelli Jones
11	September 23	(United States) Trenton 200	Trenton International Speedway	Trenton, New Jersey	Paved	(United States) A. J. Foyt	(United States) Don Branson
12	October 28	(United States) Golden State 100	California State Fairgrounds	Sacramento, California	Dirt	(United States) A. J. Foyt	(United States) A. J. Foyt
13	November 18	(United States) Bobby Ball Memorial	Arizona State Fairgrounds	Phoenix, Arizona	Dirt	(United States) Parnelli Jones	(United States) Bobby Marshman

- The Ted Horn Memorial was rained out, and a suitable alternative date was not found.

Paved/Dirt Oval
Road Course/Hill Climb
Non-championship race

^A No pole is awarded for the Pikes Peak Hill Climb, in this schedule on the pole is the driver who started first. No lap led was awarded for the Pikes Peak Hill Climb, however, a lap was awarded to the drivers that completed the climb.

== Final points standings ==
Pos	Driver	TRE1 (United States)	INDY (United States)	MIL1 (United States)	LHS1 (United States)	TRE2 (United States)	SPR (United States)	MIL2 (United States)	LHS2 (United States)	DQSF (United States)	SYR (United States)	ISF (United States)	TRE3 (United States)	CSF (United States)	ASF (United States)	Pts
1	(United States) Rodger Ward	3	1	4		1	17	1		C	1	5	5			2460
2	(United States) A. J. Foyt	1	23	**1**	1	**7**	7	2	**4**	C	2	16	**4**	**1**	2	1950
3	(United States) Parnelli Jones	2	**7**	2	2	4	2	9	3	C	**15**	**1**	19	5	**4**	1760
4	(United States) Don Branson	4	12	17	4	2	3	25	1	C	7	2	1	2	8	1700
5	(United States) Bobby Marshman	10	5	12	5	21	4	**3**	9	C	13	6	3	15	1	1581
6	(United States) Jim Hurtubise	6	13	3	**3**	5	1	21	2	C	4	8	9	4	5	1340
7	(United States) Len Sutton	7	2	15				20			DNP		2	10	9	1250
8	(United States) Jim McElreath	16	6	14	7	6	5	5	7	C	10	3	8	14	DNQ	1210
9	(United States) Eddie Sachs	18	3	21		15		4					7			1060
10	(United States) Don Davis	**5**	4	8	17	3										960
11	(United States) Lloyd Ruby		8	19			6	22		C	11	13	6	8	3	700
12	(United States) Roger McCluskey	8	16	5	14	DNQ	**15**	6	5	C	6	4	21	18	6	690
13	(United States) Ronnie Duman	19	DNQ	6	6	10	DNQ	8	10	C	9	10	20	DNQ		405
14	(United States) Allen Crowe	DNQ	31	10	10	8	DNQ	10	12	C	5	14				305
15	(United States) Troy Ruttman		18	DNQ				13		C	3	DNQ	13	6	7	280
16	(United States) Bud Tingelstad	21	15	7		9		7		C	DNQ	DNQ		DNQ	DNQ	240
17	(United States) Chuck Hulse	22	21	DNQ	13	13		26	6	C	DNQ	7	10	13	10	230
18	(United States) Elmer George	DNQ	17	18	DNQ	DNQ	10	17	DNQ		18	18		3	16	229
19	(United States) Jim Rathmann		9													200
20	(United States) Johnny Boyd		10													150
21	(United States) Shorty Templeman	9	11	16			13	18								140
22	(United States) Al Farmer	DNQ	DNQ	DNQ	8		14	24	8	C	16	DNQ	18	16	DNQ	100
23	(United States) Bobby Grim		19				8					11	11			97
24	(United States) Bob Mathouser		DNQ	DNQ	16	17	18	DNQ	13		8	DNQ	12		DNQ	83
25	(United States) Johnny Rutherford RY											15	14	7	11	80
26	(United States) Bruce Jacobi	11	DNQ	DNQ	9	12										75
27	(United States) Bobby Marvin R	17		DNQ			9	15	11	C	17	17		DNQ	12	70
28	(United States) Ernie Koch						DNQ	DNQ	16	C	12	9	22	11	17	70
29	(United States) Chuck Rodee		32	11				11								60
30	(United States) Chuck Booth R													9	15	40
31	(United States) Bob Veith		33	9				23				DNQ				40
32	(United States) Don Freeland		DNQ			11										30
33	(United States) Bill Cheesbourg		DNQ	DNQ	12	DNQ		12					17			30
34	(United States) Jiggs Peters	DNQ				23	11	DNQ	15		DNQ		24			20
35	(United States) Red Riegel				11											20
36	(United States) Keith Rachwitz		DNQ	13		Wth	12		14	C		DNQ		DNQ	DNQ	10
37	(United States) Ralph Liguori		DNQ		18	22	DNQ		17	C		12		17	13	10
38	(United States) Colby Scroggin R													12	14	10
39	(United States) Dempsey Wilson	12	DNQ													10
-	(United States) Roy Graham	13	DNQ													0
-	(United States) Leroy Neumayer	DNQ			15	14	16	DNQ				DNQ				0
-	(United States) Jack Conely R		DNQ	22		19		14		C			16			0
-	(United States) Al Miller R		DNQ				DNQ				14	DNQ				0
-	(United States) Chuck Arnold	14	DNQ									DNQ				0
-	(United States) Ebb Rose		14													0
-	(Canada) Ed Kostenuk R		DNQ	DNQ		DNQ		DNQ					15			0
-	(United States) Johnny Coy	15	DNQ										DNQ			0
-	(United States) Dick Rathmann	20	24	DNQ	DNS	18		16								0
-	(United States) Bob Christie		30	DNQ		16										0
-	(United States) Art Malone R													DNQ	18	0
-	(United States) Jack Turner		29					19				DNQ	23			0
-	(United States) Eddie Johnson		25	20												0
-	(United States) Jim Hemmings	DNQ	DNQ	DNQ	DNQ	20	DNQ									0
-	(United States) Dan Gurney R		20													0
-	(United States) Jimmy Daywalt		22													0
-	(United States) Bill Randall	DNQ				24										0
-	(United States) Paul Goldsmith		26													0
-	(United States) Gene Hartley		27													0
-	(United States) Paul Russo		28	DNQ												0
-	(United States) Curtis Turner						DNQ		DNS							0
-	(United States) Herb Hill		DNQ	DNQ				DNQ								0
-	(United States) Gig Stephens		DNQ			DNQ			DNQ							0
-	(United States) Hugh Randall	DNQ		DNQ					DNQ							0
-	(United States) Duane Carter		DNQ	DNQ												0
-	(United States) Tommy Copp		DNQ	DNQ												0
-	(United States) Mike McGreevy		DNQ	DNQ												0
-	(United States) Ray Brown	DNQ														0
-	(United States) Leon Clum		DNQ													0
-	(United States) Russ Congdon		DNQ													0
-	(United States) Chuck Daigh		DNQ													0
-	(United States) Jack Ensley		DNQ													0
-	(United Kingdom) Jack Fairman		DNQ													0
-	(United States) Cliff Griffith		DNQ													0
-	(United States) Norm Hall		DNQ													0
-	(United States) Chuck Stevenson		DNQ													0
-	(United States) Chuck Weyant		DNQ													0
-	(United States) Carl Williams										DNQ					0
-	(United States) George Morris											DNQ				0
-	(United States) Buzz Rose													DNQ		0
-	(United States) Bobby Unser													DNQ		0
-	(United States) Ray Wearne													DNQ		0
-	(United States) Howard Osborn														DNQ	0
Pos	Driver	TRE1 (United States)	INDY (United States)	MIL1 (United States)	LHS1 (United States)	TRE2 (United States)	SPR (United States)	MIL2 (United States)	LHS2 (United States)	DQSF (United States)	SYR (United States)	ISF (United States)	TRE3 (United States)	CSF (United States)	ASF (United States)	Pts

Color	Result
Gold	Winner
Silver	2nd place
Bronze	3rd place
Green	4th & 5th place
Light Blue	6th-10th place
Dark Blue	Finished (Outside Top 10)
Purple	Did not finish (Ret)
Red	Did not qualify (DNQ)
Brown	Withdrawn (Wth)
Black	Disqualified (DSQ)
White	Did not start (DNS)
Blank	Did not participate (DNP)
Blank	Not competing

**In-line notation**
**Bold**	Pole position
Italics	Ran fastest race lap
*	Led most race laps
RY Rookie of the Year
R Rookie

== See also ==
- 1962 Indianapolis 500
