= 1963 USAC Championship Car season =

Sports season

- USAC National Championship Trail

Season
- Races: 12
- Start date: April 21
- End date: November 17

Awards
- National champion: (United States) A. J. Foyt
- Indianapolis 500 winner: (United States) Parnelli Jones

The 1963 USAC Championship Car season consisted of 12 races, beginning in Trenton, New Jersey on April 21 and concluding in Phoenix, Arizona on November 17. There was also one non-championship event at Pikes Peak, Colorado. The USAC National Champion was A. J. Foyt, and the Indianapolis 500 winner was Parnelli Jones. Jim Clark's win at Milwaukee in August marked the first win for a rear-engined car in Champ Car competition.

== Schedule and results ==
Rnd	Date	Race name	Track	Location	Type	Pole position	Winning driver
1	April 21	(United States) Trenton 100	Trenton International Speedway	Trenton, New Jersey	Paved	(United States) Lloyd Ruby	(United States) A. J. Foyt
2	May 30	(United States) International 500 Mile Sweepstakes	Indianapolis Motor Speedway	Speedway, Indiana	Paved	(United States) Parnelli Jones	(United States) Parnelli Jones
3	June 9	(United States) Rex Mays Classic	Milwaukee Mile	West Allis, Wisconsin	Paved	(United States) Johnny Boyd	(United States) Rodger Ward
4	June 23	(United States) Langhorne 100	Langhorne Speedway	Langhorne, Pennsylvania	Dirt	(United States) Jim Hurtubise	(United States) A. J. Foyt
NC	July 4	(United States) Pikes Peak Auto Hill Climb	Pikes Peak Highway	Pikes Peak, Colorado	Hill	(United States) Bobby Unser^{A}	(United States) Bobby Unser
5	July 28	(United States) Trenton 150	Trenton International Speedway	Trenton, New Jersey	Paved	(United States) A. J. Foyt	(United States) A. J. Foyt
6	August 17	(United States) Tony Bettenhausen Memorial	Illinois State Fairgrounds	Springfield, Illinois	Dirt	(United States) A. J. Foyt	(United States) Rodger Ward
7	August 18	(United States) Tony Bettenhausen 200	Milwaukee Mile	West Allis, Wisconsin	Paved	(United Kingdom) Jim Clark	(United Kingdom) Jim Clark
8	September 2	(United States) Ted Horn Memorial	DuQuoin State Fairgrounds	Du Quoin, Illinois	Dirt	(United States) Rodger Ward	(United States) A. J. Foyt
9	September 14	(United States) Hoosier Hundred	Indiana State Fairgrounds	Indianapolis, Indiana	Dirt	(United States) Rodger Ward	(United States) Rodger Ward
10	September 22	(United States) Trenton 200	Trenton International Speedway	Trenton, New Jersey	Paved	(United Kingdom) Jim Clark	(United States) A. J. Foyt
11	October 27	(United States) Golden State 100	California State Fairgrounds	Sacramento, California	Dirt	(United States) Rodger Ward	(United States) Rodger Ward
12	November 17	(United States) Bobby Ball Memorial	Arizona State Fairgrounds	Phoenix, Arizona	Dirt	(United States) Johnny Rutherford	(United States) Rodger Ward

Paved/Dirt Oval
Road Course/Hill Climb
Non-championship race

^A No pole is awarded for the Pikes Peak Hill Climb, in this schedule on the pole is the driver who started first. No lap led was awarded for the Pikes Peak Hill Climb, however, a lap was awarded to the drivers that completed the climb.

== Final points standings ==
Pos	Driver	TRE1 (United States)	INDY (United States)	MIL1 (United States)	LHS (United States)	TRE2 (United States)	SPR (United States)	MIL2 (United States)	DQSF (United States)	ISF (United States)	TRE3 (United States)	CSF (United States)	ASF (United States)	Pts
1	(United States) A. J. Foyt	1	3	4	1	**1**	**2**	2	1	3	1	2	8	2950
2	(United States) Rodger Ward	18	4	1		3	1	4	**2**	**1**	26	**1**	1	2210
3	(United States) Jim McElreath	4	6	5	2	8	6	11	7	5	4	3	3	1655
4	(United States) Parnelli Jones	2	**1**	DNQ	4	22	8	23	6	18	22	12	4	1540
5	(United States) Don Branson	17	5	17	DNS	12	3	10	5	2	5	6	7	1352
6	(United Kingdom) Jim Clark RY		2					**1**			**21**			1200
7	(United States) Chuck Hulse	22	8	3	12	6	DNQ	5	3	15	19	16	2	1020
8	(United States) Roger McCluskey	8	15	18	10	7	4	6	11	6	18	5	5	750
9	(United States) Jim Hurtubise	3	22	19	**3**	4	17	8	8	10	24	11		660
10	(United States) Johnny Rutherford	10	29	20	7	16	5	7	10	4	6	17	**11**	640
11	(United States) Troy Ruttman	5	12	DNQ		5		14			3			580
12	(United States) Dan Gurney		7					3			16			580
13	(United States) Bud Tingelstad		28	15		9	11	18	12		2	13	6	490
14	(United States) Bobby Grim		25	11		2		9		11		8	10	440
15	(United States) Bobby Marshman	6	16	7	5	19	15	22	4	DNQ	20	18	18	323
16	(United States) Lloyd Ruby	**19**	19	12		24	9	26	17	8	8	4	16	320
17	(United States) Johnny White R						7	19	9	7	7	9	15	320
18	(United States) Ronnie Duman	9	DNQ	10	6	10	16			9				235
19	(United States) Al Miller		9	22	DNQ	DNQ		25		DNQ				200
20	(United States) Len Sutton	7	DNQ	6		21	12	12	13	DNQ		DNQ		170
21	(United States) Eddie Sachs	15	17	2		DNQ		24			23			160
22	(United States) Dempsey Wilson		11	DNQ		DNQ					10			160
23	(United States) Dick Rathmann		10	DNQ										150
24	(United States) Bob Harkey R		DNQ	DNQ	9	17	13		DNQ	14	9	15	DNQ	120
25	(United States) Bobby Unser		33				18					7	9	100
26	(United States) Bob Mathouser	11	DNQ	DNQ	11	11		15	DNQ		15	DNQ	14	70
27	(United States) Colby Scroggin	13	DNQ	8	DNQ					17			17	50
28	(United States) Ralph Liguori		DNQ	16	8	15	14	DNQ	18	16	DNQ			50
29	(United States) Jack Conely		DNQ	9				17						40
30	(Canada) Ed Kostenuk		DNQ	DNQ				21			11			40
31	(United States) Arnie Knepper R				13	DNQ	10		14					30
32	(United States) Chuck Booth											10	DNQ	30
33	(United States) Eddie Johnson		20								12			20
34	(United States) Sonny Helms R									13			12	10
35	(United States) Curtis Turner R	12	DNQ											10
36	(United States) Jerry Daniels R									12				10
-	(United States) Bob Veith		26	13				13						0
-	(United States) Jerry Weld R							DNQ	16	DNQ	14	DNQ	13	0
-	(United States) Chuck Rodee		DNQ					20		DNQ	13			0
-	(United States) Bruce Jacobi		DNQ		DNQ	13			DNQ	DNQ	DNQ			0
-	(United States) Bob Christie		13	DNQ										0
-	(United States) Johnny Boyd		32	**14**										0
-	(United States) Billy Cantrell R									DNQ		14	DNQ	0
-	(United States) Mel Kenyon R					14							DNQ	0
-	(United States) Jiggs Peters	14												0
-	(United States) Ebb Rose		14											0
-	(United States) Mickey Shaw R	20				18	DNQ	DNQ	15	DNQ	25			0
-	(United States) Bob Wente R		DNQ			DNQ		16			17			0
-	(United States) Allen Crowe	16	27											0
-	(United States) Paul Goldsmith		18											0
-	(United States) Art Malone		31	DNQ		20								0
-	(United States) Al Farmer	21	Wth			23	DNQ		DNQ					0
-	(United States) Pat Flaherty			21		DNQ					DNQ			0
-	(United States) Chuck Stevenson		21	DNQ										0
-	(United States) Duane Carter		23											0
-	(United States) Jim Rathmann		24											0
-	(United States) Elmer George		30									DNQ		0
-	(United States) Jimmy Davies		DNQ	DNQ						DNQ		DNQ	DNQ	0
-	(United States) Ed Hoyle	DNQ		DNQ		DNQ					DNQ			0
-	(Canada) Bob McLean						DNQ	DNQ	DNQ					0
-	(United States) Bobby Hogle								DNQ	DNQ		DNQ		0
-	(United States) Gig Stephens	DNQ	DNQ											0
-	(United States) Masten Gregory		DNQ	DNQ										0
-	(United States) Paul Russo		DNQ	DNQ										0
-	(United States) Bill Cheesbourg		DNQ								DNQ			0
-	(United States) George Morris					DNQ					DNQ			0
-	(United States) Tommy Copp									DNQ		DNQ		0
-	(United States) Ray Crawford		DNQ											0
-	(United States) Jimmy Daywalt		DNQ											0
-	(United States) Chuck Engle		DNQ											0
-	(United States) Don Freeland		DNQ											0
-	(United States) Cliff Griffith		DNQ											0
-	(United States) Norm Hall		DNQ											0
-	(United States) Gene Hartley		DNQ											0
-	(United Kingdom) Graham Hill		DNQ											0
-	(United States) Junior Johnson		DNQ											0
-	(United States) Bill Krause		DNQ											0
-	(United States) Keith Rachwitz		DNQ											0
-	(Mexico) Pedro Rodríguez		DNQ											0
-	(United States) Joe Sostilio		DNQ											0
-	(United States) Jack Turner		DNQ											0
-	(United States) Red Amick										DNQ			0
-	(United States) Howard Osborn											DNQ		0
-	(United States) Wally Talbot											DNQ		0
-	(United States) Curly Boyd												DNQ	0
-	(United States) Dee Jones												DNQ	0
Pos	Driver	TRE1 (United States)	INDY (United States)	MIL1 (United States)	LHS (United States)	TRE2 (United States)	SPR (United States)	MIL2 (United States)	DQSF (United States)	ISF (United States)	TRE3 (United States)	CSF (United States)	ASF (United States)	Pts

Color	Result
Gold	Winner
Silver	2nd place
Bronze	3rd place
Green	4th & 5th place
Light Blue	6th-10th place
Dark Blue	Finished (Outside Top 10)
Purple	Did not finish (Ret)
Red	Did not qualify (DNQ)
Brown	Withdrawn (Wth)
Black	Disqualified (DSQ)
White	Did not start (DNS)
Blank	Did not participate (DNP)
Blank	Not competing

**In-line notation**
**Bold**	Pole position
Italics	Ran fastest race lap
*	Led most race laps
RY Rookie of the Year
R Rookie

== Notes ==
- Åberg, Andreas. "USAC National Championship 1963". Driver Database. Archived from the original on September 10, 2012.
- "1963 USAC National Championship Trail". ChampCarStats.com. Archived from the original on February 24, 2012.
- http://media.indycar.com/pdf/2011/IICS_2011_Historical_Record_Book_INT6.pdf (p. 268-269)

== See also ==
- 1963 Indianapolis 500
