= 1961 USAC Championship Car season =

Sports season

- USAC National Championship Trail

Season
- Races: 12
- Start date: April 9
- End date: November 19

Awards
- National champion: (United States) A. J. Foyt
- Indianapolis 500 winner: (United States) A. J. Foyt

The 1961 USAC Championship Car season consisted of 12 races, beginning in Trenton, New Jersey on April 9 and concluding in Phoenix, Arizona on November 19. There was also one non-championship event at Pikes Peak, Colorado. The USAC National Champion and Indianapolis 500 winner was A. J. Foyt. The season was marred by the deaths of 1951 and 1958 season champion Tony Bettenhausen at the Indianapolis Motor Speedway and Al Keller at Phoenix.

== Schedule and results ==
Rnd	Date	Race name	Track	Location	Type	Pole position	Winning driver
1	April 9	(United States) Trenton 100	Trenton International Speedway	Trenton, New Jersey	Paved	(United States) Tony Bettenhausen	(United States) Eddie Sachs
2	May 30	(United States) International 500 Mile Sweepstakes	Indianapolis Motor Speedway	Speedway, Indiana	Paved	(United States) Eddie Sachs	(United States) A. J. Foyt
3	June 4	(United States) Rex Mays Classic	Milwaukee Mile	West Allis, Wisconsin	Paved	(United States) Dick Rathmann	(United States) Rodger Ward
4	June 18	(United States) Langhorne 100	Langhorne Speedway	Langhorne, Pennsylvania	Dirt	(United States) Al Keller	(United States) A. J. Foyt
NC	July 4	(United States) Pikes Peak Auto Hill Climb	Pikes Peak Highway	Pikes Peak, Colorado	Hill	(United States) Bobby Unser^{A}	(United States) Bobby Unser
5	August 20	(United States) Tony Bettenhausen 200	Milwaukee Mile	West Allis, Wisconsin	Paved	(United States) Don Branson	(United States) Lloyd Ruby
6	August 21	(United States) Tony Bettenhausen Memorial	Illinois State Fairgrounds	Springfield, Illinois	Dirt	(United States) Parnelli Jones	(United States) Jim Hurtubise
7	September 4	(United States) Ted Horn Memorial	DuQuoin State Fairgrounds	Du Quoin, Illinois	Dirt	(United States) Jim Hurtubise	(United States) A. J. Foyt
8	September 9	(United States) Syracuse 100	Syracuse Mile	Syracuse, New York	Dirt	(United States) Rodger Ward	(United States) Rodger Ward
9	September 16	(United States) Hoosier Hundred	Indiana State Fairgrounds	Indianapolis, Indiana	Dirt	(United States) A. J. Foyt	(United States) A. J. Foyt
10	September 24	(United States) Trenton 100	Trenton International Speedway	Trenton, New Jersey	Paved	(United States) Eddie Sachs	(United States) Eddie Sachs
11	October 29	(United States) Golden State 100	California State Fairgrounds	Sacramento, California	Dirt	(United States) Shorty Templeman	(United States) Rodger Ward
12	November 19	(United States) Bobby Ball Memorial	Arizona State Fairgrounds	Phoenix, Arizona	Dirt	(United States) Al Keller	(United States) Parnelli Jones

Paved/Dirt Oval
Road Course/Hill Climb
Non-championship race

^A No pole is awarded for the Pikes Peak Hill Climb, in this schedule on the pole is the driver who started first. No lap led was awarded for the Pikes Peak Hill Climb, however, a lap was awarded to the drivers that completed the climb.

== Final points standings ==
Pos	Driver	TRE1 (United States)	INDY (United States)	MIL1 (United States)	LHS (United States)	MIL2 (United States)	SPR (United States)	DQSF (United States)	SYR (United States)	ISF (United States)	TRE2 (United States)	CSF (United States)	ASF (United States)	Pts
1	(United States) A. J. Foyt	5	1	22	1	3	2	1	18	**1**	14	12	15	2150
2	(United States) Eddie Sachs	1	**2**	Wth	3	5	DNS	3	DNQ	DNQ	**1**	DNQ	6	1760
3	(United States) Rodger Ward	18	3	1		19	6	17	**1**	17	3	1	2	1680
4	(United States) Shorty Templeman		4	DNQ		10	5	2	2	5	16	**16**	12	1190
5	(United States) Al Keller		5	2	**15**	12	18	5	4	16	5	18	**17**	1000
6	(United States) Jim Hurtubise	2	22	5	8	7	1	**18**	3	18	2	14	DNS	939
7	(United States) Len Sutton	DNQ	19	4		2	10	9	9	4	11	4	8	860
8	(United States) Bobby Marshman RY	17	7	19	11	15	9	8	7	2	19	3	11	769
9	(United States) Parnelli Jones	15	12		2	23	**11**	12	5	12	9	2	1	750
10	(United States) Dick Rathmann	4	13	**3**	6	4	3	DNQ		10	20			750
11	(United States) Lloyd Ruby		8	21		1	16	16	11	DNQ	18	DNQ		670
12	(United States) Don Branson	16	33	6	14	**24**	15	6	17	8	4	7	3	530
13	(United States) Elmer George	8		8	4	DNQ	8	14	6	15		6	9	470
14	(United States) Chuck Stevenson		6											400
15	(United States) Roger McCluskey	6	27	17	5	DNQ		15	8	14	7	11	7	370
16	(United States) A. J. Shepherd	11	26	DNQ		6	4	7	15	DNQ				360
17	(United States) Chuck Hulse	12	DNQ	14	18	17	13	4	DNQ	6	6	DNQ	14	302
18	(United States) Jim McElreath R									3	21	10	4	290
19	(United States) Al Farmer	DNQ	DNQ	DNQ	16		7	13	16	DNQ	DNQ	5	5	260
20	(Australia) Jack Brabham R		9											200
21	(United States) Johnny Boyd		21	7		8			DNQ		15			160
22	(United States) Norm Hall R		10	DNQ		DNQ						DNQ		150
23	(United States) Troy Ruttman	3	20	16										140
24	(United States) Don Davis		29	DNQ	13	13	14	10	12	13	8	8	DNQ	140
25	(United States) Ronnie Duman R		DNQ	15	DNS	11	DNQ	DNQ	10	DNQ	13	9	DNQ	128
26	(United States) Bob Christie		17	20		9					10			110
27	(United States) Gene Hartley		11											100
28	(United States) Red Riegel R	DNQ			7		DNQ		DNQ	DNQ	DNQ	13	18	60
29	(United States) Ralph Liguori			DNQ		DNQ				7	DNQ	DNQ	DNQ	60
30	(United States) Len Duncan	7												60
31	(United States) Jiggs Peters	9			12		DNQ		DNQ	DNQ	DNQ			50
32	(United States) Danny Jones		DNQ						14	9	DNQ			40
33	(United States) Don Freeland		DNQ	9		DNQ								40
34	(United States) Allen Crowe R					16	17		13	DNQ	12	DNQ	10	40
35	(United States) Bruce Jacobi	14	DNQ	DNQ	10									30
36	(United States) Wayne Weiler	DNQ	15	10										30
37	(United States) Bob Cleberg	10	DNQ	DNQ	DNQ									30
38	(United States) Rex Easton	DNQ		DNQ	9		DNQ							22
39	(United States) Bud Tingelstad		DNQ	DNQ		14	DNQ	11	DNQ	DNQ	DNQ	DNQ		20
40	(United States) Eddie Johnson		18	11		DNQ					DNQ			20
41	(United States) Bob Mathouser R								DNQ	11	DNQ	DNQ		20
42	(United States) Dempsey Wilson		16	12		20	DNQ	DNQ	DNQ			15	DNQ	10
43	(United States) Jack Turner		25			21	12		DNQ	DNQ				10
-	(United States) Bill Cheesbourg		28	13							DNQ		DNQ	0
-	(United States) Don Horvath R	13										DNQ		0
-	(United States) Leroy Neumayer R											DNQ	13	0
-	(United States) Paul Goldsmith		14	18										0
-	(United States) Keith Rachwitz R											DNQ	16	0
-	(United States) Jack Rounds	20	DNQ		17									0
-	(United States) Bob Veith		DNQ			25					17			0
-	(United States) Ray Wearne R			DNQ								17	DNQ	0
-	(United States) Leon Clum R		DNQ	DNQ		18				DNQ	DNQ			0
-	(United States) Tony Bettenhausen	**19**	DNQ											0
-	(United States) Tommy Copp R	21		DNQ										0
-	(United States) Johnny Coy R	22			DNQ						22			0
-	(United States) Ernie Koch			DNQ	DNQ	22	DNQ							0
-	(United States) Ebb Rose R		23			26								0
-	(United States) Cliff Griffith		24											0
-	(United States) Jim Rathmann	DNQ	30	DNQ					DNQ					0
-	(United States) Jimmy Daywalt		31											0
-	(United States) Bobby Grim		32				DNQ	DNQ	DNQ	DNQ				0
-	(United States) Beau Clerke	DNQ		DNQ	DNQ		DNQ	DNQ	DNQ	DNQ		DNQ		0
-	(United States) Jim McWithey		DNQ	DNQ		DNQ				DNQ			DNQ	0
-	(United States) Jim Hemmings					DNQ		DNQ	DNQ		DNQ			0
-	(United States) Harry Beck		DNP			DNQ				DNQ	DNQ			0
-	(United States) Tony Bonadies	DNQ		DNQ		DNQ								0
-	(United States) Vern Harriman								DNQ	DNQ	DNQ			0
-	(United States) Ray Crawford		DNQ									DNQ	DNQ	0
-	(United States) Bill Randall	DNQ	DNQ											0
-	(Canada) Bert Brooks		DNQ	DNQ										0
-	(United States) Jack Conely			DNQ		DNQ								0
-	(Canada) Ed Kostenuk							DNQ	DNQ					0
-	(United States) Chuck Arnold		DNQ								DNQ			0
-	(United States) Al Pombo											DNQ	DNQ	0
-	(United States) Tony Romit	DNQ												0
-	(United States) Duane Carter		DNQ											0
-	(United States) Russ Congdon		DNQ											0
-	(United States) Jack Ensley		DNQ											0
-	(United States) Mike Magill		DNQ											0
-	(United States) Chuck Rodee		DNQ											0
-	(United States) Paul Russo		DNQ											0
-	(United States) Bud Sterrett		DNQ											0
-	(United States) Bob Wente		DNQ											0
-	(United States) Chuck Weyant		DNQ											0
-	(United States) Cliff Spalding			DNQ										0
-	(United States) Ray Brown										DNQ			0
-	(United States) Hal Rettberg										DNQ			0
-	(United States) Bill Hyde											DNQ		0
-	(United States) Russ Long											DNQ		0
-	(United States) Jimmy Davies												DNQ	0
Pos	Driver	TRE1 (United States)	INDY (United States)	MIL1 (United States)	LHS (United States)	MIL2 (United States)	SPR (United States)	DQSF (United States)	SYR (United States)	ISF (United States)	TRE2 (United States)	CSF (United States)	ASF (United States)	Pts

Color	Result
Gold	Winner
Silver	2nd place
Bronze	3rd place
Green	4th & 5th place
Light Blue	6th-10th place
Dark Blue	Finished (Outside Top 10)
Purple	Did not finish (Ret)
Red	Did not qualify (DNQ)
Brown	Withdrawn (Wth)
Black	Disqualified (DSQ)
White	Did not start (DNS)
Blank	Did not participate (DNP)
Blank	Not competing

**In-line notation**
**Bold**	Pole position
Italics	Ran fastest race lap
*	Led most race laps
RY Rookie of the Year
R Rookie

== See also ==
- 1961 Indianapolis 500
