= 1961 Indianapolis 500 =

American motor race

45th Indianapolis 500
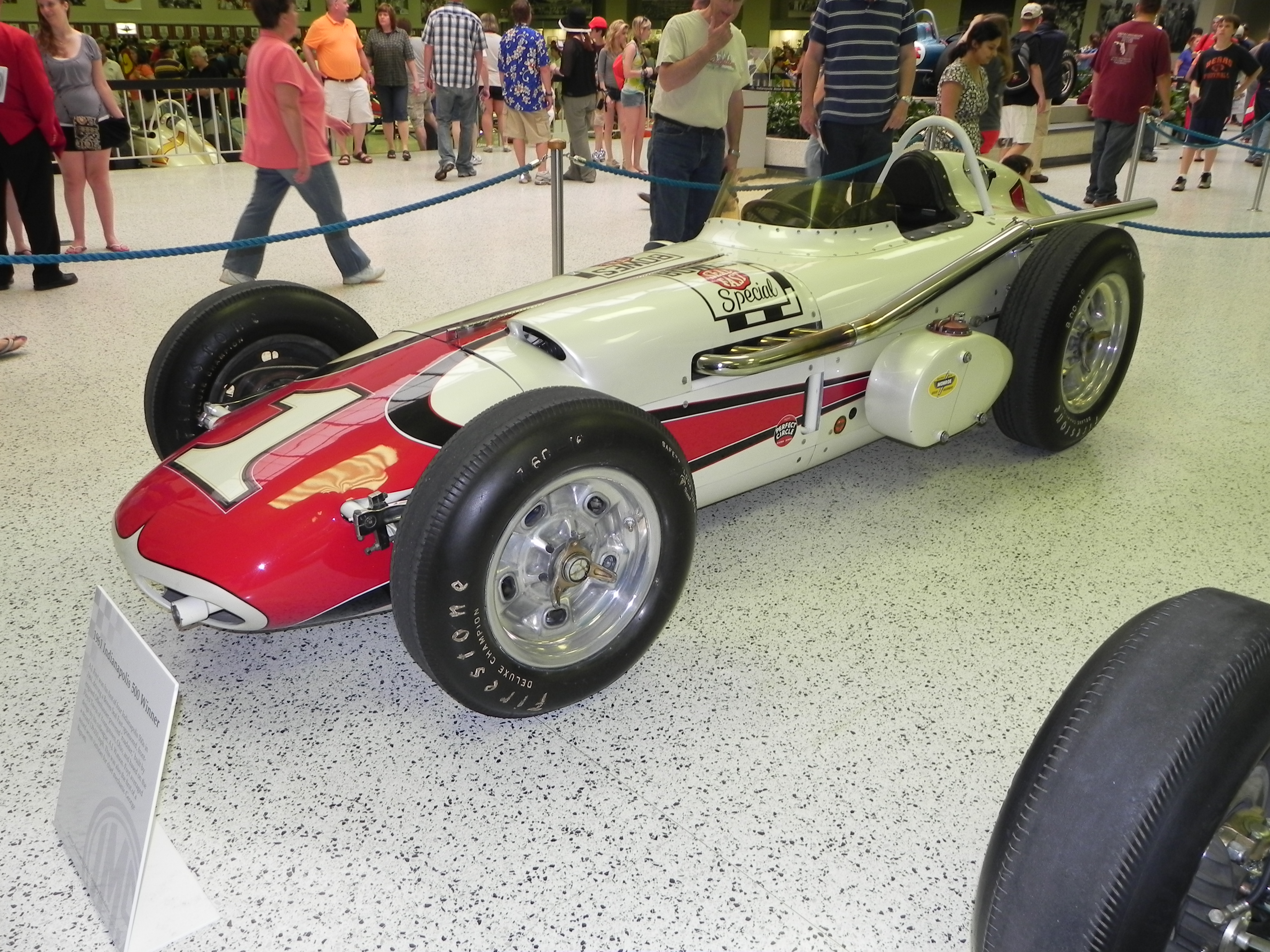

Indianapolis Motor Speedway

Indianapolis 500
- Sanctioning body: USAC
- Season: 1961 USAC season
- Date: May 30, 1961
- Winner: A. J. Foyt
- Winning team: Bignotti-Bowes Racing Associates
- Winning Chief Mechanic: George Bignotti
- Time of race: 3:35:37.49
- Average speed: 139.130 mph (223.908 km/h)
- Pole position: Eddie Sachs
- Pole speed: 147.481 mph (237.348 km/h)
- Fastest qualifier: Eddie Sachs
- Rookie of the Year: Bobby Marshman & Parnelli Jones (co-winners)
- Most laps led: A. J. Foyt (71)

Pre-race ceremonies
- National anthem: Purdue Band
- "Back Home Again in Indiana": Mel Torme
- Starting command: Tony Hulman
- Pace car: Ford Thunderbird
- Pace car driver: Sam Hanks
- Starter: Bill Vanderwater
- Honorary referee: Raymond Firestone
- Estimated attendance: 300,000

Chronology
Previous	Next
1960	1962

The 45th International 500-Mile Sweepstakes was held at the Indianapolis Motor Speedway in Speedway, Indiana on Tuesday, May 30, 1961. For the first time since 1949, the Indianapolis 500 was not recognized on the World Championship calendar. The race celebrated the 50th anniversary of the first Indy 500 in 1911.

Eddie Sachs and A. J. Foyt were battling for 1st-2nd in the latter stages of the race. On Foyt's final scheduled pit stop, his crew was unable to properly engage the fuel mechanism, and his car did not take on a full load of fuel. Foyt returned to the track, and was pulling away from Sachs. Foyt's car was running faster due to the light fuel load, but his crew signaled him that he would be unable to make it to the finish without another pit stop. The crew borrowed a fuel feed mechanism from Len Sutton's team, and signaled Foyt to the pits.

Foyt gave up the lead on lap 184 for a splash-and-go. That handed the lead to Sachs, who was now leading by 25 seconds. With three laps to go, the warning tread showed on Sachs' rear tire and Sachs decided to play it safe. Rather than nurse the car around, he pitted to replace the worn tire on lap 197. Foyt took the lead with three laps to go and won his first (of four) Indy 500 by a margin of 8.28 seconds.

A notable story included the appearance of two-time defending Formula One World Champion Jack Brabham from Australia, who drove the race in a low-slung, British built Cooper powered by a Coventry Climax engine. Dubbed the "British Invasion," it would be the first notable post-war appearance of a rear-engined car, and within five years the rear-engined revolution would take over the Speedway. The venerable front-engined roadsters with their larger and more powerful engines were much faster down the long straights, but the superior handling of Brabham's Cooper in the corners kept his car competitive. Brabham qualified 17th at 145.144 mph and drove the car to a respectable 9th-place finish, completing all 200 laps.

Five months after the race in October 1961, the front straight of the track was paved over with asphalt, and thus the entire track was now paved in asphalt and only a single yard of bricks at the start/finish line was left exposed from the original 1909 brick surface. The remainder of the original 3,200,000 bricks now lie underneath the asphalt surface. This meant that the 1961 race was the last 500 in which cars raced on the original bricks other than those at the start/finish line.

== Practice and time trials ==
Nicknamed the "Tinley Park Express," Tony Bettenhausen, Sr. was killed in a crash during a practice run on May 12. He was testing a car for Paul Russo. It was determined that an anchor bolt fell off the front radius rod support, permitting the front axle to twist and mis-align the front wheels when the brakes were applied. The car plunged into the outside wall, then rode along the top, snapping fence poles and tearing segments of the catch fence. The car came to rest upside-down on top of the outside wall, and Bettenhausen was killed instantly. Before the time trials Bettenhausen had been the favorite to become the first driver to break the 150 mph barrier at the Speedway.

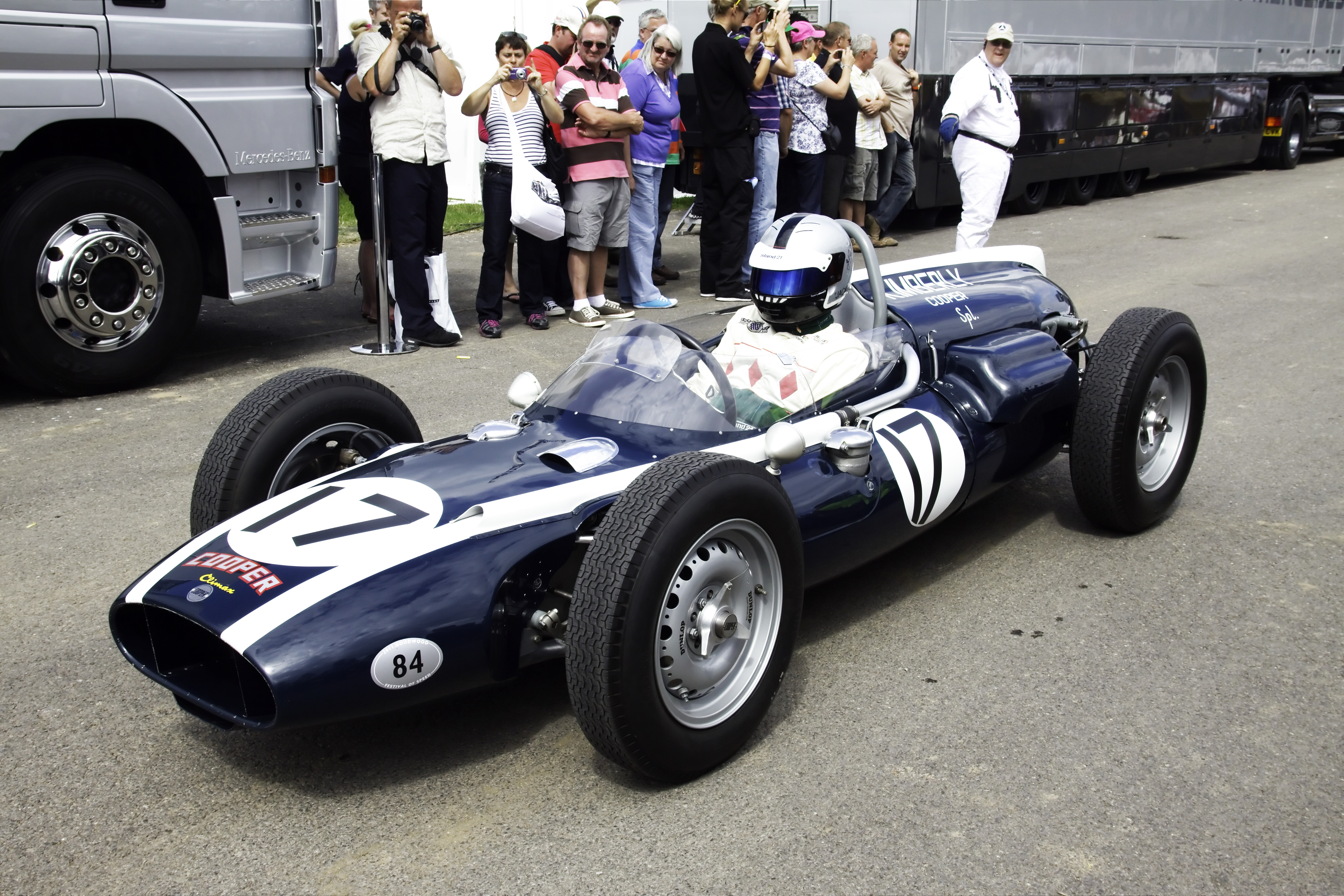
The rear-engined Cooper T54 with which dual and reigning World F1 Drivers' Champion Jack Brabham placed ninth. Jack and the Cooper are credited with starting the rear-engine revolution at Indianapolis

Time trials was scheduled for four days:

- Saturday May 13 – Pole Day time trials
- Sunday May 14 – Second day time trials
- Saturday May 20 – Third day time trials
- Sunday May 21 – Fourth day time trials

Eddie Sachs sat on the pole with an average speed of 147.481 mph (237.348 km/h).

== Starting grid ==
Row	Inside		Middle		Outside	
1	12	(United States) Eddie Sachs	3	(United States) Don Branson	99	(United States) Jim Hurtubise
2	2	(United States) Rodger Ward W	98	(United States) Parnelli Jones R	97	(United States) Dick Rathmann
3	1	(United States) A. J. Foyt	8	(United States) Len Sutton	14	(United States) Bill Cheesbourg
4	33	(United States) Eddie Johnson	4	(United States) Jim Rathmann W	15	(United States) Wayne Weiler
5	17	(Australia) Jack Brabham R	73	(United States) A. J. Shepherd R	28	(United States) Gene Hartley
6	32	(United States) Bob Christie	10	(United States) Paul Goldsmith	7	(United States) Shorty Templeman
7	86	(United States) Ebb Rose R	41	(United States) Johnny Boyd	45	(United States) Jack Turner
8	52	(United States) Troy Ruttman W	55	(United States) Jimmy Daywalt	16	(United States) Bobby Grim
9	5	(United States) Lloyd Ruby	19	(United States) Al Keller	83	(United States) Don Davis R
10	18	(United States) Chuck Stevenson	22	(United States) Roger McCluskey R	26	(United States) Cliff Griffith
11	35	(United States) Dempsey Wilson	34	(United States) Norm Hall R	31	(United States) Bobby Marshman R

R Indianapolis 500 rookie
W Indianapolis 500 winner

=== Alternates ===
- First alternate: Paul Russo (#21, #24)

=== Failed to qualify ===
- Chuck Arnold (#62)
- Harry Beck R (#95) – Entry declined, lack of experience
- Tony Bettenhausen (#15, #24) – Fatal accident
- Bert Brooks R (#79)
- Duane Carter (#61, #64)
- Bob Cleberg R (#6)
- Leon Clum R (#77)
- Russ Congdon R (#69)
- Ray Crawford (#94)
- Ronnie Duman R (#43)
- Jack Ensley R (#84)
- Cotton Farmer R (#23)
- Don Freeland (#27, #47)
- Chuck Hulse R (#37)
- Danny Jones R (#47)
- Ralph Ligouri R (#75)
- Mike Magill (#82)
- Jim McWithey (#29)
- Bill Randall R (#95)
- Chuck Rodee R (#89)
- Jack Rounds R (#44, #87)
- Bud Tingelstad (#54)
- Bob Veith (#23, #25, #44, #85)
- Bob Wente R (#88)
- Chuck Weyant (#88)

== Box score ==
Finish	Start	No	Name	Chassis	Engine	Tire	Qual	Laps	Status
1	7	1	(United States) A. J. Foyt	Trevis	Offenhauser	F	145.903	200	139.130 mph
2	1	12	(United States) Eddie Sachs	Ewing	Offenhauser	F	147.481	200	+8.28
3	4	2	(United States) Rodger Ward W	Watson	Offenhauser	F	146.187	200	+55.19
4	18	7	(United States) Shorty Templeman	Meskowski	Offenhauser	F	144.341	200	+3:33.35
5	26	19	(United States) Al Keller	Phillips	Offenhauser	F	146.157	200	+4:54.45
6	28	18	(United States) Chuck Stevenson	Salih	Offenhauser	F	145.191	200	+5:22.96
7	33	31	(United States) Bobby Marshman R	Epperly	Offenhauser	F	144.293	200	+5:43.28
8	25	5	(United States) Lloyd Ruby	Epperly	Offenhauser	F	146.909	200	+6:49.65
9	13	17	(Australia) Jack Brabham R	Cooper	Coventry Climax	D	145.144	200	+8:03.37
10	32	34	(United States) Norm Hall R	Kurtis Kraft	Offenhauser	F	144.555	200	+8:04.90
11	15	28	(United States) Gene Hartley	Trevis	Offenhauser	F	144.817	198	Flagged
12	5	98	(United States) Parnelli Jones R	Watson	Offenhauser	F	146.080	192	Flagged
13	6	97	(United States) Dick Rathmann	Watson	Offenhauser	F	146.033	164	Fuel Pump
14	17	10	(United States) Paul Goldsmith	Lesovsky	Offenhauser	F	144.741	160	Connecting Rod
15	12	15	(United States) Wayne Weiler	Watson	Offenhauser	F	145.349	147	Wheel Bearing
16	31	35	(United States) Dempsey Wilson	Kuzma	Offenhauser	F	144.202	145	Fuel Pump
17	16	32	(United States) Bob Christie	Kurtis Kraft	Offenhauser	F	144.782	132	Piston
18	10	33	(United States) Eddie Johnson	Kuzma	Offenhauser	F	145.843	127	Crash T4
19	8	8	(United States) Len Sutton	Watson	Offenhauser	F	145.897	110	Clutch
20	22	52	(United States) Troy Ruttman W	Watson	Offenhauser	F	144.799	105	Clutch
21	20	41	(United States) Johnny Boyd	Watson	Offenhauser	F	144.092	105	Clutch
22	3	99	(United States) Jim Hurtubise	Epperly	Offenhauser	F	146.306	102	Piston
23	19	86	(United States) Ebb Rose R	Porter	Offenhauser	F	144.338	93	Rod
24	30	26	(United States) Cliff Griffith	Elder	Offenhauser	F	145.038	55	Piston
25	21	45	(United States) Jack Turner	Kurtis Kraft	Offenhauser	F	144.904	52	Crash FS
26	14	73	(United States) A. J. Shepherd R	Christensen	Offenhauser	F	144.954	51	Crash FS
27	29	22	(United States) Roger McCluskey R	Moore	Offenhauser	F	145.068	51	Crash FS
28	9	14	(United States) Bill Cheesbourg	Kuzma	Offenhauser	F	145.873	50	Crash FS
29	27	83	(United States) Don Davis R	Trevis	Offenhauser	F	145.349	49	Crash FS
30	11	4	(United States) Jim Rathmann W	Watson	Offenhauser	F	145.413	48	Magneto
31	23	55	(United States) Jimmy Daywalt	Kurtis Kraft	Offenhauser	F	144.219	27	Brake Line
32	24	16	(United States) Bobby Grim	Watson	Offenhauser	F	144.029	26	Piston
33	2	3	(United States) Don Branson	Epperly	Offenhauser	F	146.843	2	Bent Valves

W Former Indianapolis 500 winner

R Indianapolis 500 Rookie

=== Race statistics ===
Lap Leaders
Laps	Leader
1–35	Jim Hurtubise
36–41	Jim Rathmann
42–44	Parnelli Jones
45–51	Eddie Sachs
52–75	Parnelli Jones
76–83	A. J. Foyt
84–88	Troy Ruttman
89	A. J. Foyt
90–94	Troy Ruttman
95–124	A. J. Foyt
125–137	Eddie Sachs
138	A. J. Foyt
139–141	Eddie Sachs
142–146	A. J. Foyt
147–151	Eddie Sachs
152–160	A. J. Foyt
161–167	Rodger Ward
168–169	Eddie Sachs
170–183	A. J. Foyt
184–197	Eddie Sachs
198–200	A. J. Foyt

Total laps led
Driver	Laps
A. J. Foyt	71
Eddie Sachs	44
Jim Hurtubise	35
Parnelli Jones	27
Troy Ruttman	10
Rodger Ward	7
Jim Rathmann	6

Yellow Lights: 2 for 33 minutes, 2 seconds
Laps*	Reason
52–67	Davis, Shepherd, Turner, McCluskey, Cheesebourg crash mainstretch (25:12)
129–136	Eddie Johnson crash turn four (7:50)
* – Approximate lap counts

Tire participation chart
Supplier	No. of starters
Firestone	32*
Dunlop	1
* – Denotes race winner

== Track worker fatality ==
John Masariu, 38, father of 6, of Danville, Indiana was serving as a member of the fire/safety crew. On the 127th lap of the race, driver Eddie Johnson spun out in turn 4, but did not suffer significant damage and he was not injured. A small fire broke out on the car. A safety fire truck went to his aid. John Masariu, who was the principal of Ben Davis Junior High and was serving as a safety worker, fell or jumped off the back of the fire truck. A moment later, the truck driven by James (Johnny) Williams accidentally backed over him, and he was injured fatally.

== Broadcasting ==
=== Radio ===
The race was carried live on the IMS Radio Network. Sid Collins served as chief announcer with Fred Agabashian serving as "driver expert" The broadcast represented the 10th anniversary of the network, which was formed in 1952. This was Mike Ahern's first year on the network. This was Ahern's only year in Turn 2.

The broadcast was heard on over 450 affiliates, including Armed Forces Radio. The broadcast reached all 50 U.S. states. The race reached approximately 100 million listeners worldwide.

Indianapolis Motor Speedway Radio Network
Booth Announcers	Turn Reporters	Pit/garage reporters
Chief Announcer: Sid Collins; Driver expert: Fred Agabashian; Statistician: Charlie Brockman	Turn 1: Bill Frosh; Turn 2: Mike Ahern R Backstretch: Bernie Herman; Turn 3: Lou Palmer; Turn 4: Jim Shelton	Jack Shapiro (north pits); Luke Walton (center pits); Johny Peterson (south pits)

=== Television ===
The race itself was not televised. However, ABC Sports showed highlights of time trials on Wide World of Sports.

== Gallery ==
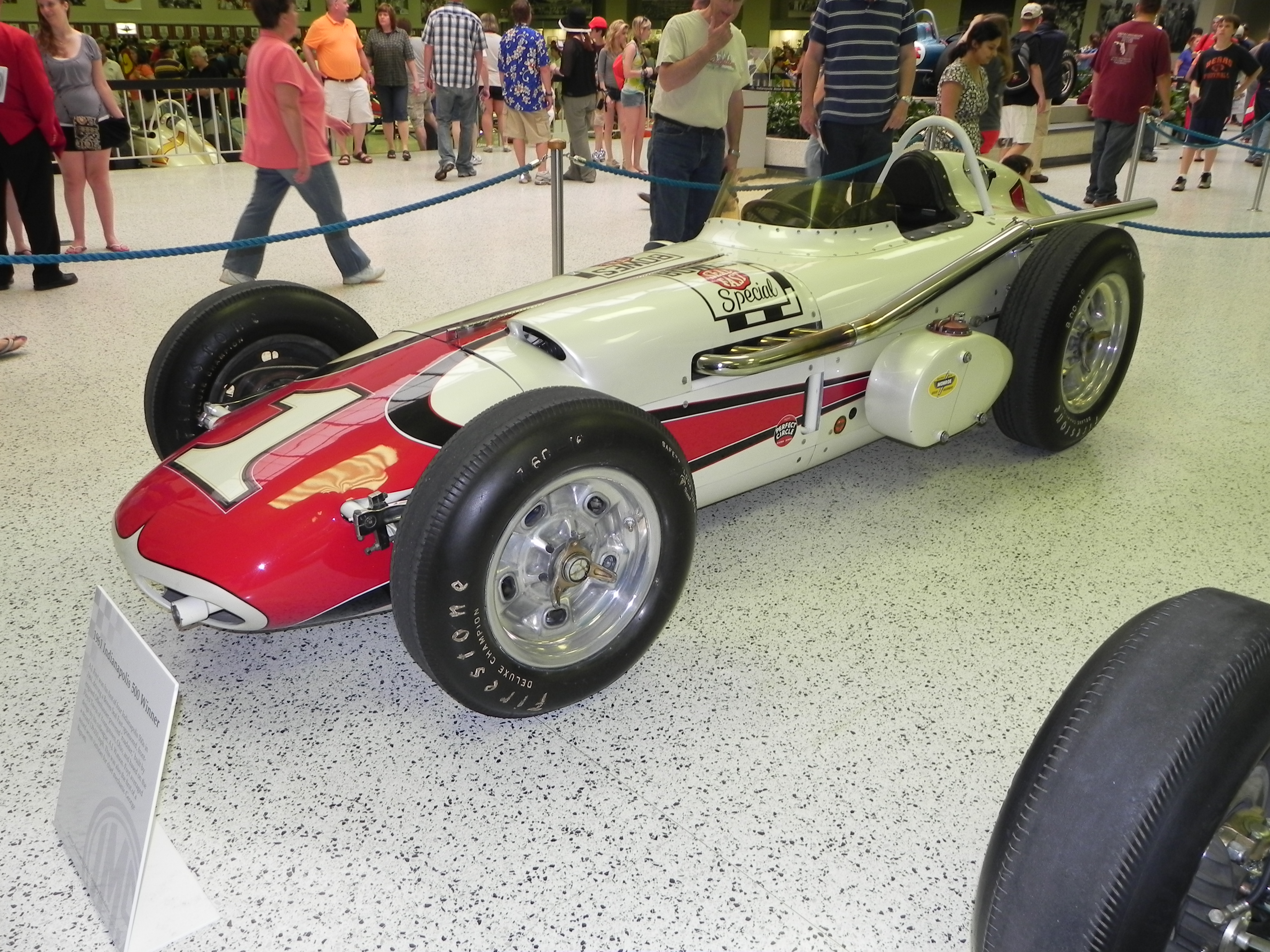
1961 winning car

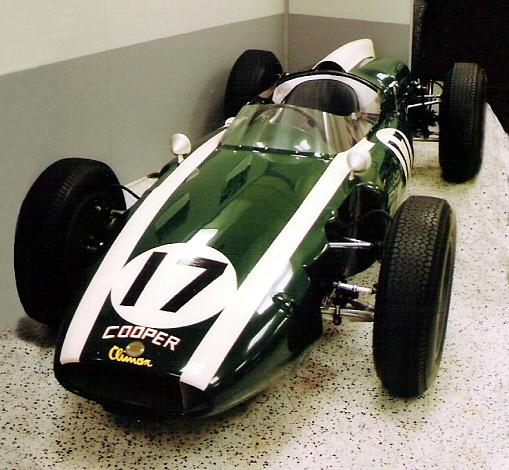
Replica of Jack Brabham's 1961 Cooper-Climax T54

== Notes ==
=== Works cited ===
- Indianapolis 500 History: Race & All-Time Stats - Official Site
- 1961 Indianapolis 500 Radio Broadcast, Indianapolis Motor Speedway Radio Network

Previous race: 1961 Trenton 100	USAC Championship Car; 1961 season	Next race: 1961 Rex Mays Classic
Previous race: 1960 Indianapolis 500	Indianapolis 500	Next race: 1962 Indianapolis 500
Preceded by 138.767 mph (1960 Indianapolis 500)	Record for the Indianapolis 500 fastest average speed 139.130 mph	Succeeded by 140.293 mph (1962 Indianapolis 500)
