= T54 =

T54 may refer to:

== Tanks ==
- T-54, a Soviet tank
- T54 (American tank), a prototype American tank

== Automobiles ==
- Cooper T54, a British racing car
- Lola T54, a British racing car
- Tatra 54, a Czechoslovak automobile

== Other uses ==
- T54 (classification), a disability sport classification
- T54 (road), a former trunk road in Ireland
- Textron T-54A Marlin II, a U.S. Navy version of the Beechcraft Super King Air 260 aircraft
