= Cooper T54 =

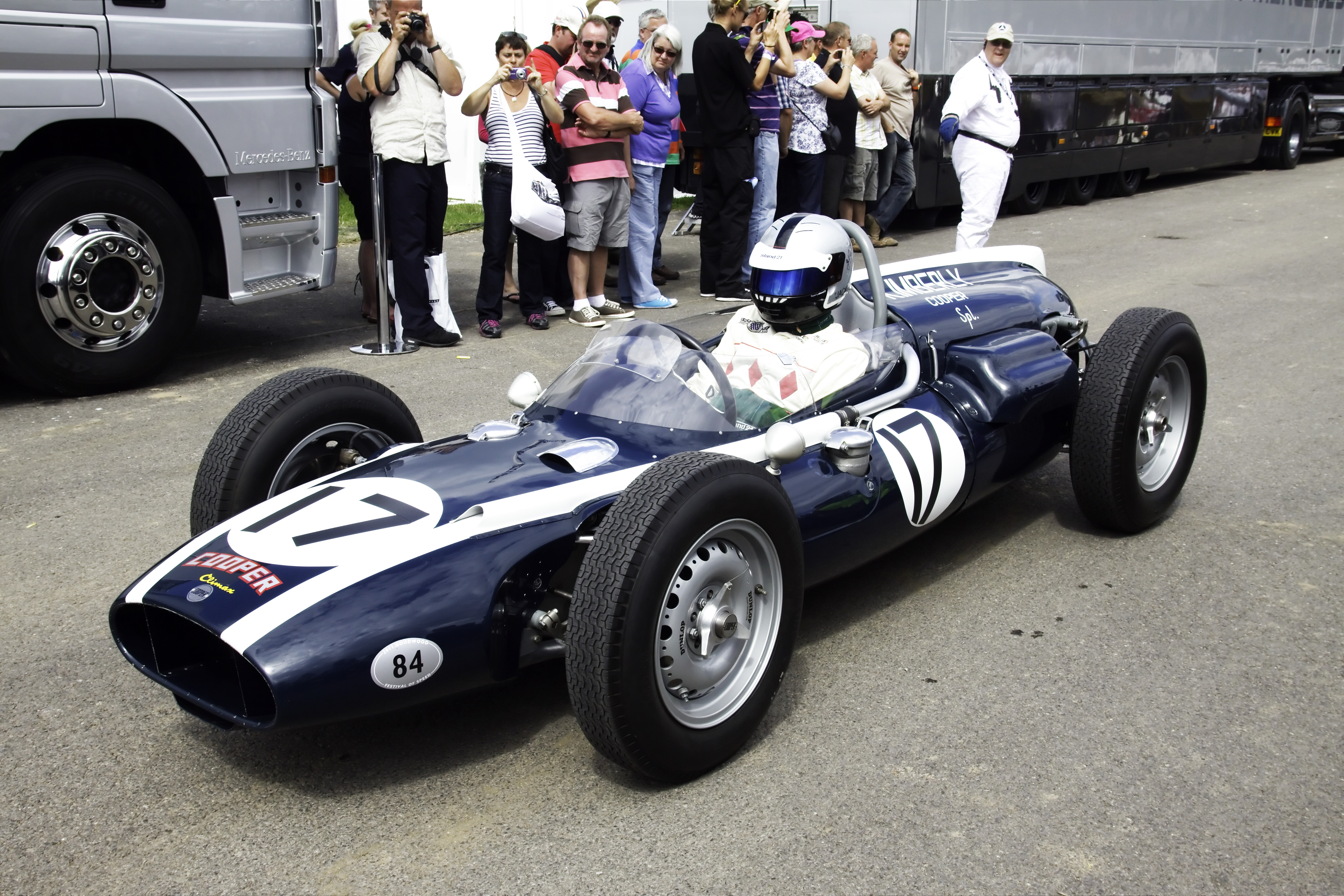
- Category: U.S.A.C. IndyCar

Technical specifications
- Engine: Coventry Climax FPF 2.75 L (167.8 cu in); 8-valve, DOHC L4, naturally-aspirated, mid-mounted
- Transmission: 5-speed manual

Competition history
- Debut: 1961 Indianapolis 500

The Cooper T54 is a rear-engined open-wheel race car chassis, designed, developed, and built by Cooper, for U.S.A.C. Indy car racing, between 1961 and 1963. It was powered by a 250 hp (190 kW) 2.75 L (168 cu in) Coventry Climax FPF four-cylinder, but later used an Aston Martin six-cylinder engine, installed by automotive mechanic and engineer Joe Huffaker, after the car had been by Jim Kimberly to Kjell Qvale. After competing in IndyCar racing, it competed in a variety of different motorsports, including sprint car racing, where it was powered by larger Ford, Buick, and Chevrolet V8 engines.

== History ==
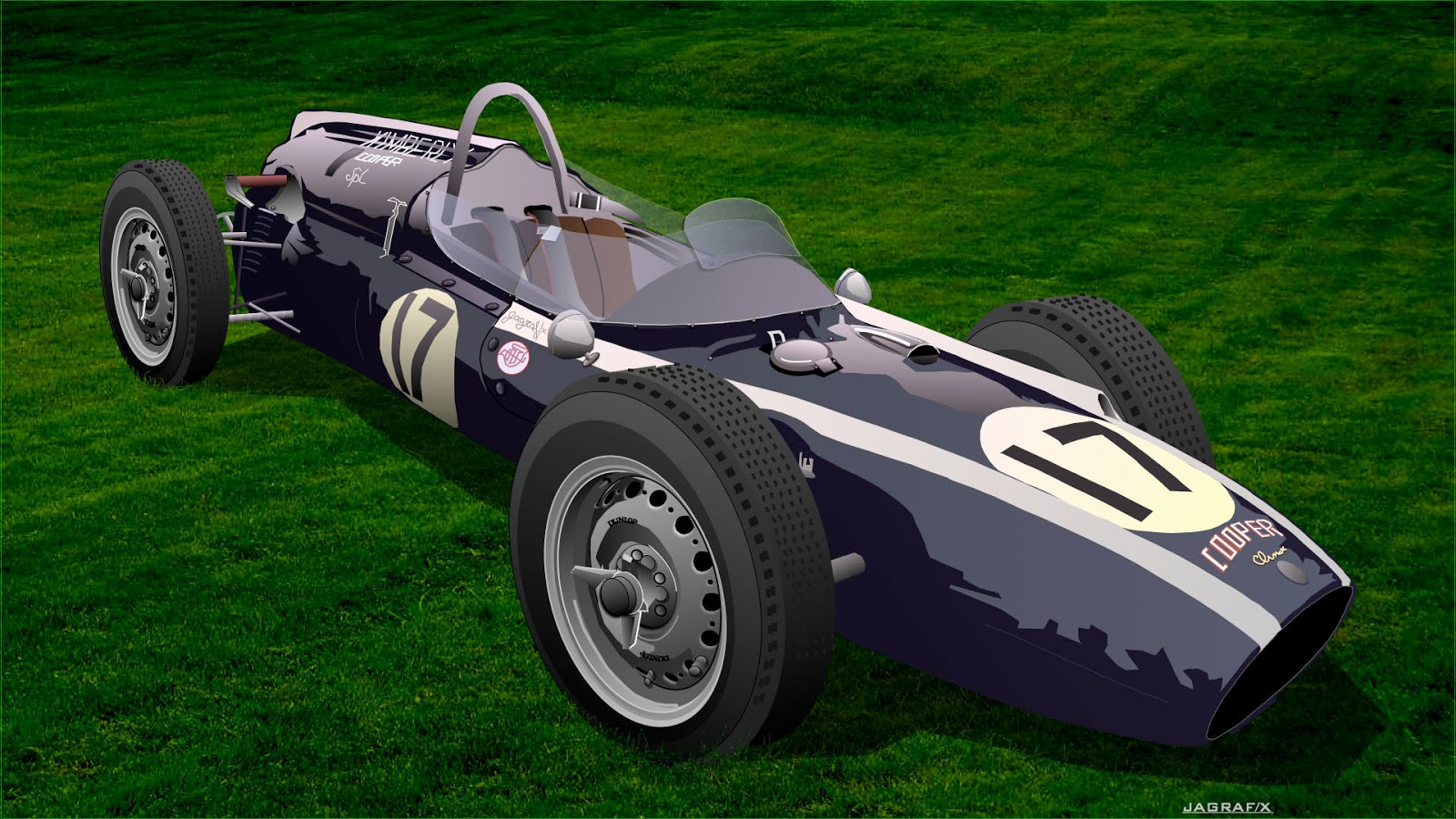
Cooper-Climax T54 used by Jack Brabham in the 1961 Indianapolis 500

In 1961, Brabham entered the famous Indianapolis 500 oval race for the first time in a modified version of the Formula One Cooper. It had a 2.7-litre Climax engine producing 268 bhp (200 kW; 272 PS) compared to the 4.4-litre, 430 bhp (321 kW; 436 PS) Offenhauser engines used by the front-engined roadsters driven by all the other entrants. Jack qualified a respectable 17th at 145.144 mp/h (pole winner Eddie Sachs qualified at 147.481 mp/h), and while the front-engined roadsters were much faster on the long front and back straights, the rear-engined Cooper's superior handling through the turns and the shorter north and south sections kept the reigning World Champion competitive. Brabham ran as high as third before finishing ninth, completing all 200 laps. Although most of the doubters in the American Indycar scene claimed that rear-engine cars were for drivers who like to be pushed around, as Brabham put it, it "triggered the rear-engined revolution at Indy" and within five years most of the cars that raced at Indianapolis would be rear-engined.

In 1963, Pedro Rodríguez entered the Indianapolis, in an Aston Martin-powered Cooper T54, but failed to qualify.
