= Trenton 150 =

- Venue: Trenton International Speedway
- First race: 1946
- Last race: 1979
- Most wins (driver): A. J. Foyt (12)
- Most wins (team): Sheraton-Thompson (9)
- Most wins (manufacturer): Chassis: Eagle (6); Engine: Offenhauser (35)

The Trenton 150 was an American Championship Car race held at Trenton International Speedway from 1946 until 1979. In most years, two races were held: one in April, and one in September. Race lengths varied between 100, 150, 200, or 300 miles. The first four editions were held on a dirt track.

== Race winners ==
Season	Date	Race title	Winning driver	Chassis	Engine	Team
AAA National Championship — 1-mile (1.6 km) dirt oval
1946	May 5	Eastern Inaugural Trophy Sweepstakes	Joie Chitwood	?	Offy	Peters
1946	May 30		Johnny Shackleford	?	Offy	Nyquist
1946	September 29		Joie Chitwood	?	Offy	Nyquist
1947–1948: Not held
1949	June 19	Trenton 100	Myron Fohr	Marchese	Offy	Marchese
1950–1956: Not held
USAC National Championship — 1-mile (1.6 km) paved oval
1957	September 29	Trenton 100	Pat O'Connor	Kuzma	Offy	Chapman Root
1958	March 30	Trenton 100	Len Sutton	Kuzma	Offy	Central Excavating
1958	September 28	Trenton 100	Rodger Ward	Lesovsky	Offy	Wolcott
1959	April 19	Race of Champions	Tony Bettenhausen	Kuzma	Offy	Central Excavating
1959	September 27	Trenton 100	Eddie Sachs	Meskowski	Offy	Competition Engineering
1960	April 10	Trenton 100	Rodger Ward	Watson	Offy	Leader Card Racing
1960	September 25	Trenton 100	Eddie Sachs	Kuzma	Offy	Dean Van Lines
1961	April 9	Trenton 100	Eddie Sachs	Ewing	Offy	Dean Van Lines
1961	September 24	Trenton 100	Eddie Sachs	Kuzma	Offy	Dean Van Lines
1962	April 8	Trenton 100	A. J. Foyt	Meskowski	Offy	George Bignotti
1962	July 22	Trenton 150	Rodger Ward	Watson	Offy	Leader Card Racing
1962	September 22	Trenton 200	A. J. Foyt	Trevis	Offy	Sheraton-Thompson
1963	April 21	Trenton 100	A. J. Foyt	Meskowski	Offy	Sheraton-Thompson
1963	July 28	Trenton 150	A. J. Foyt	Trevis	Offy	Sheraton-Thompson
1963	September 22	Trenton 200	A. J. Foyt	Trevis	Offy	Sheraton-Thompson
1964	April 19	Trenton 100	A. J. Foyt	Watson	Offy	Sheraton-Thompson
1964	July 19	Trenton 150	A. J. Foyt	Watson	Offy	Sheraton-Thompson
1964	September 27	Trenton 200	Parnelli Jones	Lotus	Ford	Team Lotus
1965	April 25	Trenton 100	Jim McElreath	Brabham	Offy	Zink-Urschel
1965	July 18	Trenton 150	A. J. Foyt	Lotus	Ford	Sheraton-Thompson
1965	September 26	Trenton 200	A. J. Foyt	Lotus	Ford	Sheraton-Thompson
1966	April 24	Trenton 150	Rodger Ward	Lola	Offy	Mecom Racing
1966	September 25	Trenton 200	Mario Andretti	Brawner Hawk	Ford	Dean Van Lines
1967	April 23	Trenton 150	Mario Andretti	Brawner Hawk	Ford	Dean Van Lines
1967	September 24	Trenton 200	A. J. Foyt	Coyote	Ford	Sheraton-Thompson
1968	April 21	Trenton 150	Bobby Unser	Eagle	Offy	Rislone
1968	September 22	Trenton 200	Mario Andretti	Brawner	Offy	Brawner-Andretti Racing Team
USAC National Championship — 1.5-mile (2.4 km) paved dog-leg oval
1969	July 19	Trenton 200	Mario Andretti	Brawner Hawk	Ford	STP Oil Treatment
1969	September 21	Trenton 300	Mario Andretti	Brawner Hawk	Ford	STP Oil Treatment
1970	April 26	Trenton 200	Lloyd Ruby	Laycock	Offy	Gene White Racing
1970	October 3	Trenton 300	Al Unser	Colt	Ford	Vel’s Parnelli Jones Racing
1971	April 25	Trenton 200	Mike Mosley	Watson	Ford	G. C. Murphy
1971	October 3	Marlboro 300	Bobby Unser	Eagle	Offy	All American Racers
1972	April 23	Trentonian 200	Gary Bettenhausen	McLaren	Offy	Penske Racing
1972	September 24	Trenton 300	Bobby Unser	Eagle	Offy	All American Racers
1973	April 15	Trentonian Split 300	A. J. Foyt	Coyote	Foyt	Gilmore Racing
1973	April 15	Trentonian Split 300	Mario Andretti	Parnelli	Offy	Parnelli Jones Racing
1973	September 23	Trenton 200	Gordon Johncock	Eagle	Offy	Patrick Racing
1974	April 7	Trentonian 200	Bobby Unser	Eagle	Offy	All American Racers
1974	September 22	Trenton 300	A. J. Foyt	Coyote	Foyt	Gilmore Racing
1974	September 22	Trenton 300	Bobby Unser	Eagle	Offy	All American Racers
1975	April 6	Trenton 200	A. J. Foyt	Coyote	Foyt	Gilmore Racing
1975	April 27	World Series of Auto Racing^{A}	Johnny Rutherford	McLaren	Offy	McLaren Cars
1975	September 21	Trenton 150	Gordon Johncock	Wildcat	DGS	Patrick Racing
1976	May 2	Trenton 200	Johnny Rutherford	McLaren	Offy	McLaren Racing
1976	August 15	Trenton 200	Gordon Johncock	Wildcat	DGS	Patrick Racing
1977	April 30	Trenton 200	Wally Dallenbach	Wildcat	DGS	Patrick Racing
1978	April 23	Gabriel 200	Gordon Johncock	Wildcat	DGS	Patrick Racing
1978	September 23	Machinist Union 150	Mario Andretti	Penske	Cosworth	Penske Racing
CART National Championship — 1.5-mile (2.4 km) paved dog-leg oval
1979	June 10	Trenton Twin Indy	Bobby Unser	Penske	Cosworth	Team Penske
1979	June 10	Trenton Twin Indy	Bobby Unser	Penske	Cosworth	Team Penske
1979	August 19	Ditzler 150	Rick Mears	Penske	Cosworth	Penske Racing

^A Non-championship event
