= Don Freeland =

American racing driver (1925–2007)

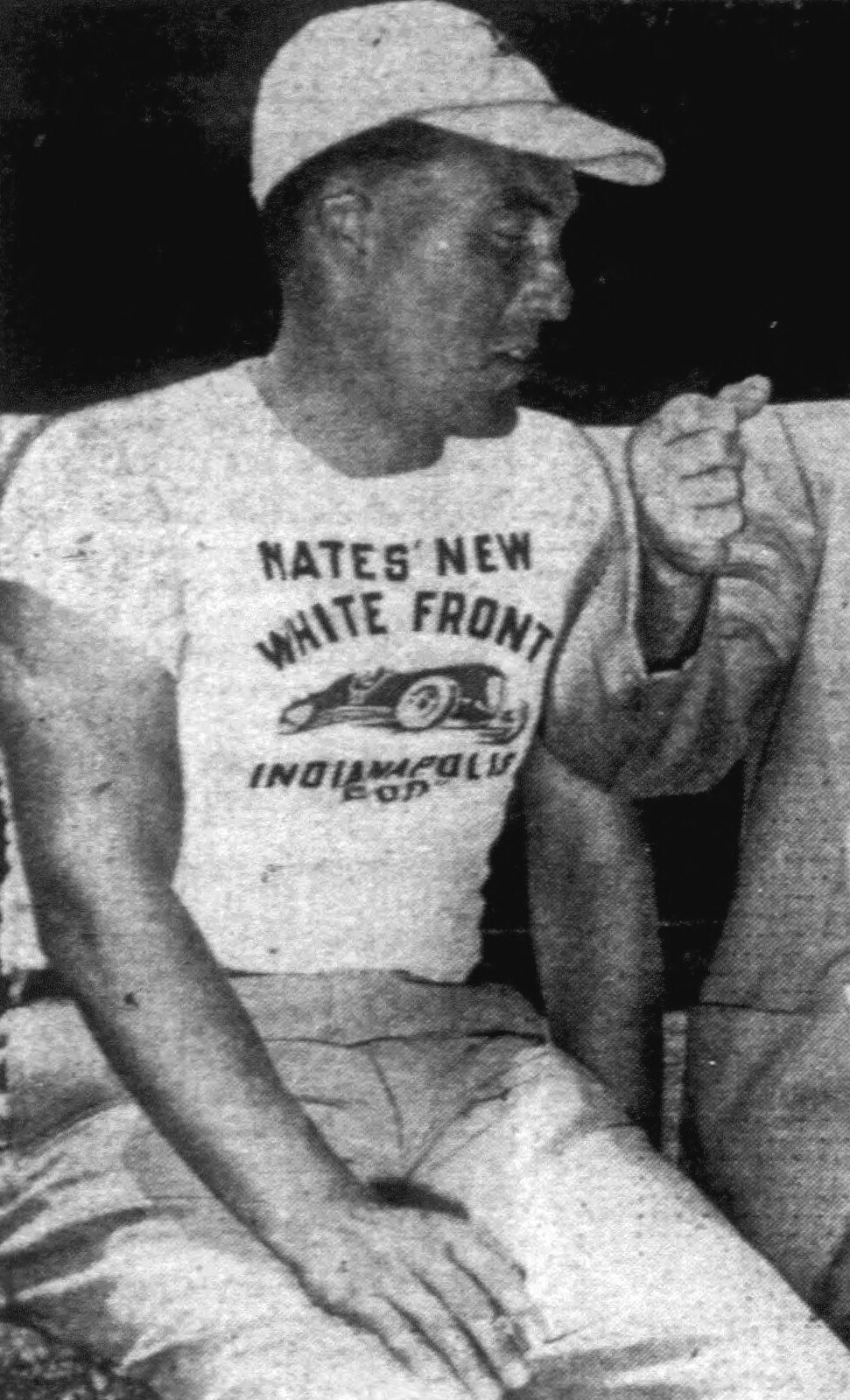
- Freeland in 1953
- Born: Donald Lloyd Freeland; March 25, 1925 Los Angeles, California, U.S.
- Died: November 2, 2007 (aged 82) San Diego, California, U.S.

Champ Car career
- 70 races run over 12 years
- Years active: 1952–1963
- Best finish: 3rd – 1956
- First race: 1952 Syracuse 100 (Syracuse)
- Last race: 1962 Trenton 150 (Trenton)
Wins	Podiums	Poles
0	10	4

Formula One World Championship career
- Active years: 1953–1960
- Team(s): Phillips, Kurtis Kraft, Watson
- Entries: 8
- Championships: 0
- Wins: 0
- Podiums: 1
- Career points: 4
- Pole positions: 0
- Fastest laps: 0
- First entry: 1953 Indianapolis 500
- Last entry: 1960 Indianapolis 500

Don Freeland (March 25, 1925 – November 2, 2007) was an American racecar driver who is best known for competing in the Indianapolis 500 eight times.

Born in Los Angeles, California, Freeland served in the Navy as a mechanic during World War II. After the war, he began racing. He raced in the AAA and USAC Championship Car series from 1952 to 1962, with 76 career starts. He finished in the top-ten 41 times, with a best finish of second place occurring three times.

Freeland competed in the Indy 500 each year from 1953 to 1960. He appeared headed for a second-place finish in 1955 before a transmission failure ended his day 22 laps prior to the end of the race. He came back with a best Indy finish of third the next year. He also finished in the top-ten in 1954 and 1958.

Freeland died in San Diego, California at age 82.

== Complete AAA/USAC Championship Car results ==
Year	1	2	3	4	5	6	7	8	9	10	11	12	13	Pos	Points
1952	INDY	MIL	RAL	SPR	MIL	DET	DUQ	PIK	SYR; 6	DNC; 14	SJS	PHX		33rd	80
1953	INDY; 27	MIL; 16	SPR; 3	DET; DNQ	SPR; 7	MIL; 5	DUQ; 12	PIK	SYR; 3	ISF; 4	SAC; 17	PHX; 6		7th	750
1954	INDY; 7	MIL; 9	LAN; 9	DAR; 18	SPR; 3	MIL; 9	DUQ; 17	PIK	SYR; 2	ISF; DNQ	SAC; DNS	PHX; DNQ	LVG; DNQ	10th	760
1955	INDY; 15	MIL; 12	LAN; 3	SPR	MIL; 12	DUQ; 18	PIK	SYR; 13	ISF; 6	SAC; 6	PHX; 16			14th	315.2
1956	INDY; 3	MIL; 6	LAN; 7	DAR; 10	ATL	SPR; 2	MIL; 24	DUQ; 17	SYR; 11	ISF; 9	SAC; 2	PHX; 13		3rd	1.280
1957	INDY; 17	LAN; 13	MIL; DNQ	DET; 8	ATL; 6	SPR; 8	MIL; 15	DUQ	SYR; 12	ISF; 16	TRE	SAC; DNQ	PHX; 14	24th	190
1958	TRE	INDY; 7	MIL; DNQ	LAN; 6	ATL	SPR; 3	MIL; 21	DUQ; 9	SYR; 18	ISF; 16	TRE; 14	SAC; DNQ	PHX	13th	560
1959	DAY	TRE	INDY; 22	MIL; 8	LAN; 8	SPR; 9	MIL; 3	DUQ; 15	SYR; 17	ISF; 7	TRE	SAC	PHX	11th	480
1960	TRE; 21	INDY; 22	MIL; DNQ	LAN	SPR; DNQ	MIL; 4	DUQ	SYR; DNS	ISF	TRE	SAC	PHX		24th	240
1961	TRE	INDY; DNQ	MIL; 9	LAN	MIL; DNQ	SPR	DUQ	SYR	ISF	TRE	SAC	PHX		33rd	40
1962	TRE	INDY; DNQ	MIL	LAN	TRE; 11	SPR	MIL	LAN	SYR	ISF	TRE	SAC	PHX	32nd	30
1963	TRE	INDY; DNQ	MIL	LAN	TRE	SPR	MIL	DUQ	ISF	TRE	SAC	PHX		-	0

== Indy 500 results ==
Year	Car	Start	Qual	Rank	Finish	Laps	Led	Retired
1953	38	15	136.867	12	27	76	0	Crash T4
1954	7	6	138.339	17	7	200	0	Running
1955	12	21	139.866	14	15	178	3	Transmission
1956	16	26	141.699	22	3	200	4	Running
1957	3	21	139.649	33	17	192	0	Flagged
1958	26	13	143.033	17	7	200	0	Running
1959	15	25	143.056	14	22	136	0	Valve spring
1960	73	11	144.352	14	22	129	0	Magneto
Totals						1311	7	

Starts	8
Poles	0
Front Row	0
Wins	0
Top 5	1
Top 10	3
Retired	4

== World Championship career summary ==
The Indianapolis 500 was part of the FIA World Championship from 1950 through 1960. Drivers competing at Indy during those years were credited with World Championship points and participation. Freeland participated in eight World Championship races. He started on the pole 0 times, won 0 races, set 0 fastest laps, and finished on the podium one time He accumulated a total of four championship points.
