= Shorty Templeman =

American racing driver (1919–1962)

- Born: Clark Thomas Templeman; August 12, 1919 Pueblo, Colorado, U.S.
- Died: August 24, 1962 (aged 43) Marion, Ohio, U.S.

Champ Car career
- 42 races run over 9 years
- Years active: 1954–1962
- Best finish: 4th – 1961
- First race: 1954 Bobby Ball Memorial (ASF)
- Last race: 1962 Tony Bettenhausen 200 (Milwaukee)
Wins	Podiums	Poles
0	2	3

Formula One World Championship career
- Active years: 1955–1956, 1958–1960
- Team(s): Kurtis Kraft, Hillegass, Trevis
- Entries: 5 (3 starts)
- Championships: 0
- Wins: 0
- Podiums: 0
- Career points: 0
- Pole positions: 0
- Fastest laps: 0
- First entry: 1955 Indianapolis 500
- Last entry: 1960 Indianapolis 500

Clark Thomas "Shorty" Templeman (August 12, 1919 in Pueblo, Colorado – August 24, 1962 in Marion, Ohio) was an American racecar driver.

== Championship car ==
Templeman drove in the AAA and USAC Championship Car series, racing in the 1954-1962 seasons with 42 starts, including the Indianapolis 500 races in 1955, 1958, and 1960–1962. He finished in the top-ten 16 times, with his best finish in second position, in 1961 at both DuQuoin and Syracuse. His best Indy finish was fourth in 1961.

== Midget car ==
Templeman won five Washington state and three Oregon midget state championships. Templeman won all three Night Before the 500 midget car features at the 16th Street Speedway in Indianapolis in 1956. Templeman won the first three USAC National Midget Series champions when he won titles in 1956, 1957, and 1958.

Templeman died as a result of injuries sustained in a midget car crash at the Marion County, Ohio Fairgrounds track.

== Career awards ==
- He was inducted in the National Sprint Car Hall of Fame in 1984.
- He was inducted in the National Midget Auto Racing Hall of Fame in the inaugural class of 1984.

== Indianapolis 500 results ==
Year	Car	Start	Qual	Rank	Finish	Laps	Led	Retired
1955	81	31	135.014	31	18	142	0	Stalled
1958	83	23	142.817	21	19	116	0	Brakes
1960	26	19	143.856	17	17	191	0	Flagged
1961	7	18	144.341	27	4	200	0	Running
1962	4	6	149.050	6	11	200	0	Running
Totals						849	0	

Starts	5
Poles	0
Front Row	0
Wins	0
Top 5	1
Top 10	1
Retired	2

== World Championship career summary ==
The Indianapolis 500 was part of the FIA World Championship from 1950 through 1960. Drivers competing at Indy during those years were credited with World Championship points and participation. Templeman participated in three World Championship races but scored no World Championship points.
