= Bob Cleberg =

American racing driver (1929–2018)

- Born: Robert Andrew Cleberg; May 28, 1929 Milwaukee, Wisconsin, U.S.
- Died: July 28, 2018 (aged 89) Oregon, Wisconsin, U.S.

Champ Car career
- 4 races run over 3 years
- Best finish: 37th (1961)
- First race: 1959 Bobby Ball Memorial (Phoenix)
- Last race: 1961 Trenton 100 (Trenton)
Wins	Podiums	Poles
0	0	1

Robert Andrew Cleberg (May 28, 1929 – July 28, 2018) was an American racing driver.

== Biography ==
Cleberg competed in several Indy car races from the 1959 through 1961 USAC Championship Car seasons. He completed rookie testing for the 1960 Indianapolis 500, drawing media coverage for completing the protocol in a vehicle he had flipped a day earlier. Despite this, Cleberg was unable to qualify for the event. He won the pole for the 1960 Bobby Ball Memorial, the final event of the season, held in Phoenix, Arizona.
