= Floyd Trevis =

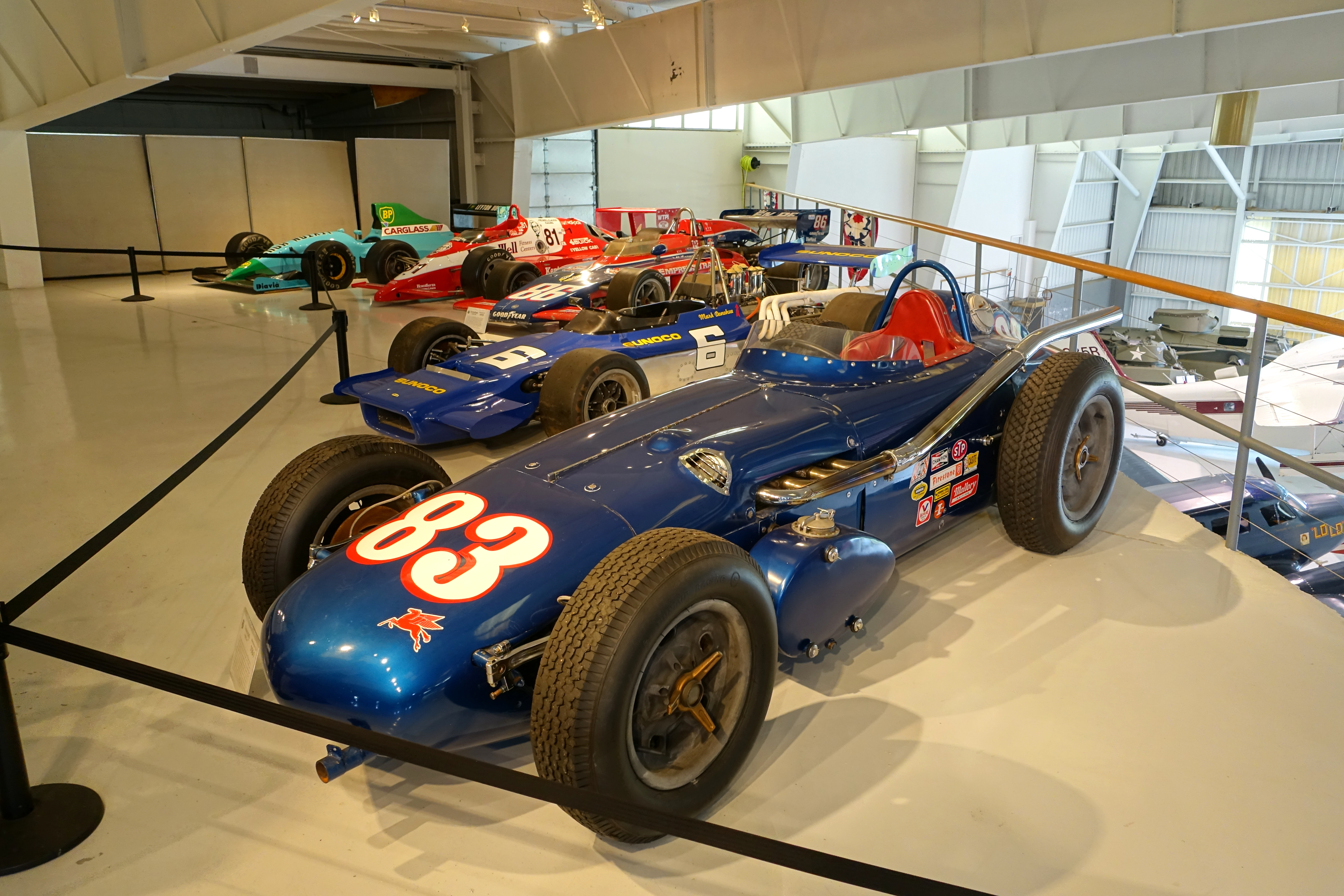
Trevis Indy Car, 1961

Floyd Trevis of Youngstown, Ohio was an American builder of racing cars and sprint cars. Cars built by Trevis competed in FIA World Championship (Indy 500 only) and USAC events from 1951 to 1961.

As a builder of sprint cars, Trevis provided the vehicles for a great number of champions. One of his most successful cars was the 1971 sprinter #29 known as "Old Blue" which scored a total of 146 feature wins.

== World Championship Indy 500 results ==
| Season | Driver | Grid | Classification | Points | Note | Race Report |
|---|---|---|---|---|---|---|
| 1951 | Bill Vukovich | 20 | Ret | | Oil Leak | Report |
| 1952 | Eddie Johnson | 24 | 16 | | | Report |
| 1955 | Eddie Johnson | 32 | 13 | | | Report |
| 1955 | Shorty Templeman | 31 | Ret | | Transmission | Report |
| 1960 | Eddie Johnson | 7 | 6 | 1 | | Report |
| 1960 | Bud Tingelstad | 28 | 9 | | | Report |

== Other Indy 500 results ==
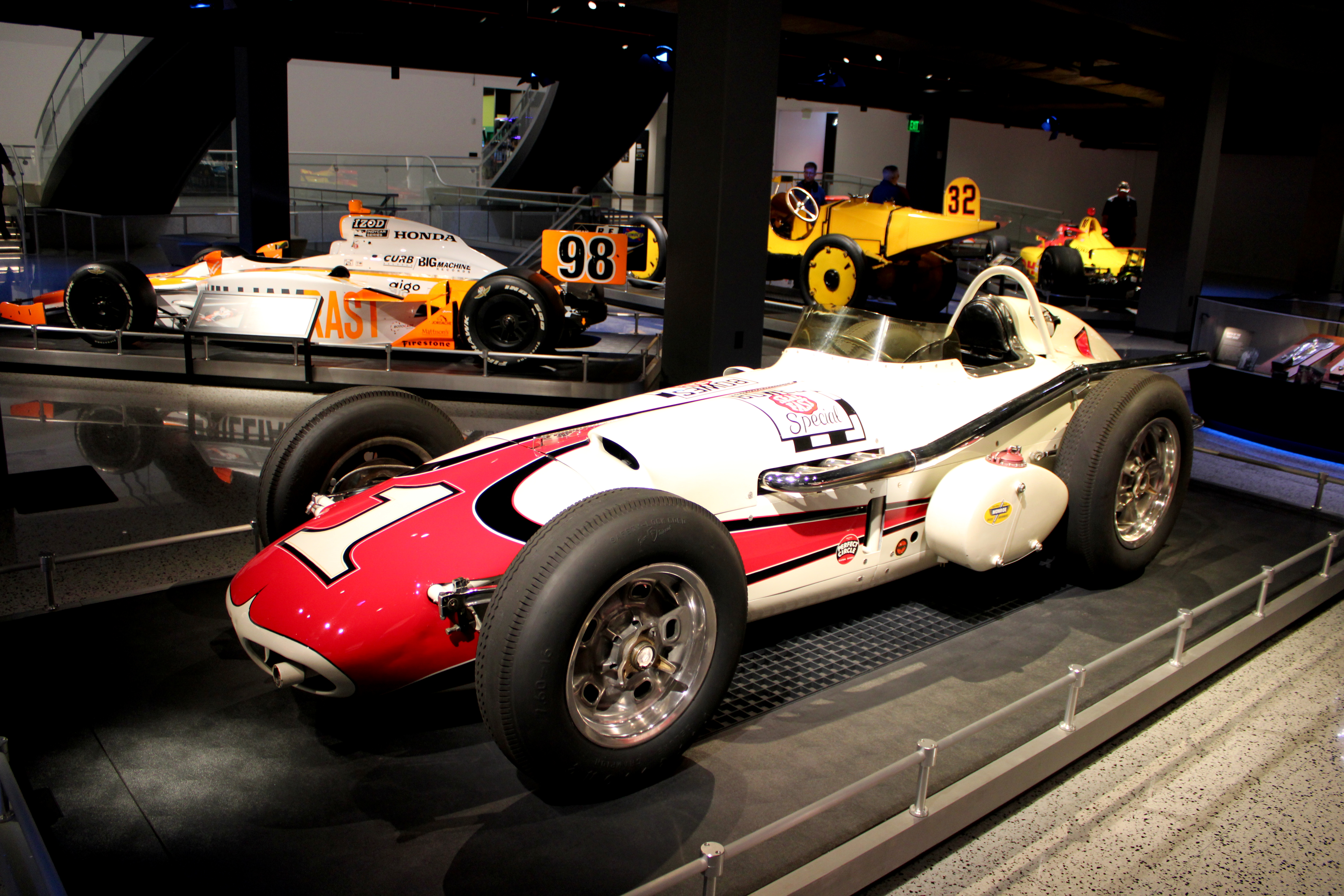
A. J. Foyt's 1961 Bowes Seal Fast Special Trevis on display at the Indianapolis Motor Speedway Museum

| Season | Driver | Engine | Start | Finish | Note | Race Report |
|---|---|---|---|---|---|---|
| 1961 | A. J. Foyt | Offenhauser | 7 | 1 | | Report |
