= Don Davis (racing driver) =

American racing driver (1933–1962)

- Born: Donald Lee Davis; December 18, 1933 Tucson, Arizona, U.S.
- Died: August 8, 1962 (aged 28) Dayton, Ohio, U.S.

Champ Car career
- 15 races run over 4 years
- Years active: 1959–1962
- Best finish: 10th – 1962
- First race: 1960 Bobby Ball Memorial (ASF)
- Last race: 1962 Trenton 150 (Trenton)
Wins	Podiums	Poles
0	1	1

Donald Lee Davis (December 18, 1933 – August 8, 1962) was an American racecar driver.

Born in Tucson, Arizona, Davis died in Dayton, Ohio as a result of injuries suffered in a sprint car race at New Bremen Speedway. He drove in the USAC Championship Car series, racing in the 1960-1962 seasons with 15 starts, including the 1961 and 1962 Indianapolis 500 races. He finished in the top-ten eight times, with his two best finishes in third at Trenton and in fourth at Indianapolis, both in 1962. Davis served in the Korean War.

== Indy 500 results ==
Year	Car	Start	Qual	Rank	Finish	Laps	Led	Retired
1961	83	27	145.349	15	29	49	0	Crash
1962	27	12	147.209	12	4	200	0	Running
Totals						249	0	

Starts	2
Poles	0
Front Row	0
Wins	0
Top 5	1
Top 10	1
Retired	1
