= Al Keller =

American racing driver (1920–1961)

- Born: Alvah August Keller; April 11, 1920 Alexander, New York, U.S.
- Died: November 19, 1961 (aged 41) Phoenix, Arizona, U.S.

NASCAR Cup Series career
- 29 races run over 6 years
- Best finish: 32nd (1949)
- First race: 1949 Race 4 (Langhorne)
- Last race: 1956 Race 9 (Lakewood)
- First win: 1954 Race 5 (Savannah)
- Last win: 1954 International 100 (Linden Airport)
Wins	Top tens	Poles
2	12	1

Champ Car career
- 31 races run over 8 years
- Years active: 1954–1961
- Best finish: 5th – 1961
- First race: 1954 Syracuse 100 (Syracuse)
- Last race: 1961 Bobby Ball Memorial (ASF)
Wins	Podiums	Poles
0	4	2

Formula One World Championship career
- Active years: 1955–1960
- Team(s): Kurtis Kraft, Kuzma
- Entries: 6 (5 starts)
- Championships: 0
- Wins: 0
- Podiums: 0
- Career points: 0
- Pole positions: 0
- Fastest laps: 0
- First entry: 1955 Indianapolis 500
- Last entry: 1960 Indianapolis 500

Alvah August Keller (April 11, 1920 – November 19, 1961) was an American racecar driver.

== NASCAR ==
Keller participated in the NASCAR Strictly Stock/Grand National series from 1949 to 1956 with 29 career starts. He won two races during the 1954 season and was the first driver in the history of NASCAR's top division to have won a race in a foreign-built car. Keller won the 1954 Grand National road-race at the Linden Airport in New Jersey, driving a Jaguar owned by big band leader Paul Whiteman. He also won by a two-lap margin at Oglethorpe Speedway in 1954.

== IndyCar ==
In 1954, Keller began a transition to Championship Cars. He drove in the AAA and USAC Champ Car series, racing in the 1954-1959 and 1961 seasons with 32 starts, including the Indianapolis 500 six times. He was involved in the crash that killed Bill Vukovich in 1955. He finished in the top-ten 13 times, with a best finish of second two times (Atlanta in 1956, and Milwaukee in 1961). His best Indy 500 finish was fifth in 1961.

== Death ==
Keller died as a result of injuries sustained in a Champ Car crash at the Arizona State Fairgrounds track.

== Indianapolis 500 results ==
Year	Car	Start	Qual	Rank	Finish	Laps	Led	Retired
1955	42	22	139.551	17	27	54	0	Crash BS
1956	55	28	141.193	26	14	195	0	Flagged
1957	16	8	141.398	14	27	75	0	Crash T1
1958	52	21	142.931	19	11	200	0	Running
1959	57	28	142.057	27	18	163	0	Piston
1961	19	26	146.157	6	5	200	0	Running
Totals						887	0	

Starts	6
Poles	0
Front Row	0
Wins	0
Top 5	1
Top 10	1
Retired	3
