= Hugh Randall =

American racing driver

Hugh Grant Randall (October 31, 1933 – July 1, 1962) was an American racing driver from Louisville, Kentucky.

Randall was a veteran sprint car racer who attempted to venture into American Championship Car Racing in 1962.

In the spring and summer of 1962, Randall failed to qualify for races at Trenton Speedway and the Milwaukee Mile.

In July of that same year, Randall arrived at Langhorne Speedway, again attempting to make his Championship debut. His #46 entry failed to qualify, but he stayed around for the race attempting to serve as a substitute or relief driver. The #63 Vargo Special was started by Bob Mathouser who pulled in after 60 laps due to poor handling. Elmer George got in the car and drove seventeen laps but was also dissatisfied with the car's handling. That led Randall to attempt to take over the reins. On his third lap behind the wheel the car caught a rut and vaulted end over end and landed upside-down, pinning Randall, who ultimately died of a broken neck.

The Vargo Special car that Randall died in was also the car in which Dick Linder and Van Johnson had been killed in racing crashes.

Elmer George later relieved Bobby Marshman in that same Langhorne race and drove Marshman's car to a fifth-place finish.
