= Eddie Johnson (racing driver) =

American racecar driver

- Born: February 10, 1919
- Died: June 30, 1974 (aged 55)

Formula One World Championship career
- Nationality: (United States) American
- Active years: 1952–1960
- Team(s): Trevis, Kurtis Kraft, Turner, Pawl, Kuzma
- Entries: 9
- Championships: 0
- Wins: 0
- Podiums: 0
- Career points: 1
- Pole positions: 0
- Fastest laps: 0
- First entry: 1952 Indianapolis 500
- Last entry: 1960 Indianapolis 500

Eddie Johnson (February 10, 1919 – June 30, 1974) was an American race car driver.

Born in Richmond, Virginia, Johnson grew up in Los Angeles, where he was a high school acquaintance of 1950 Indianapolis 500 winner Johnnie Parsons. He drove in the AAA and USAC Championship Car series, racing in the 1950–1952 and 1955–1966 seasons with 33 starts, including the Indianapolis 500 races in all of those years but the first two. He finished in the top-ten nine times, with his best finish in third position, in 1959 at Trenton. Late in his career, Johnson frequently came to Indianapolis without an assigned car only to be signed on to a team which needed a driver to put a struggling car in the race. In 1965, Johnson became the last person on the track in the Indianapolis 500 mile race with a naturally aspirated Offenhauser in a roadster. Johnson was flagged to finish in tenth place.

Johnson died in a plane crash near Cleveland, Ohio. The National Transportation Safety Board ruled the probable cause was pilot error, specifically attempting to fly visually in unsuitable weather and structurally overloading the airplane.

== Indianapolis 500 results ==
Year	Car	Start	Qual	Rank	Finish	Laps	Led	Retired
1952	81	24	133.973	30	16	193	0	Flagged
1953*	2	-	-	-	7	?	?	Running
1954**	2	-	-	-	22	?	?	Retirement
1955	83	32	134.449	32	13	196	0	Flagged
1956	81	32	139.093	32	15	195	0	Flagged
1957	43	20	140.171	28	25	93	0	Wheel bearing
1958	61	26	142.670	26	9	200	0	Running
1959	19	8	144.000	9	8	200	0	Running
1960	22	7	145.003	10	6	200	0	Running
1961	33	10	145.843	12	18	127	0	Crash T4
1962	32	18	146.592	23	25	38	0	Magneto
1963	88	21	148.509	22	20	112	0	Crash BS
1964	84	24	152.905	11	26	6	0	Fuel Pump
1965	23	28	153.998	32	10	195	0	Flagged
1966	54	29	158.898	28	7	175	0	Stalled
Totals						1930	0	

Starts	13
Poles	0
Front Row	0
Wins	0
Top 5	0
Top 10	5
Retired	6

* shared drive with Jim Rathmann
** shared drive with Rodger Ward

- During his Indy career, Johnson drove 4,825 miles without leading a lap. Only Chet Miller and Dick Simon completed more laps at Indianapolis without leading a lap.

== World Championship career summary ==
The Indianapolis 500 was part of the FIA World Championship from 1950 through 1960. Drivers competing at Indy during those years were credited with World Championship points and participation. Johnson participated in nine World Championship races and scored one World Championship point.
