= Bert Brooks =

Canadian racecar driver (1920–1968

Bert Brooks (March 20, 1920 – September 2, 1968) was a Canadian racecar driver, who was born in Fredericton, New Brunswick.

Brooks made two attempts in 1961 for USAC Championship Car races, including the 1961 Indianapolis 500, failing to qualify because of his slow times.

Brooks was a sprint car racer on the east coast of the U.S., racing and capturing wins in Pennsylvania and New York.
