= Rodger Ward =

American racing driver (1921–2004)

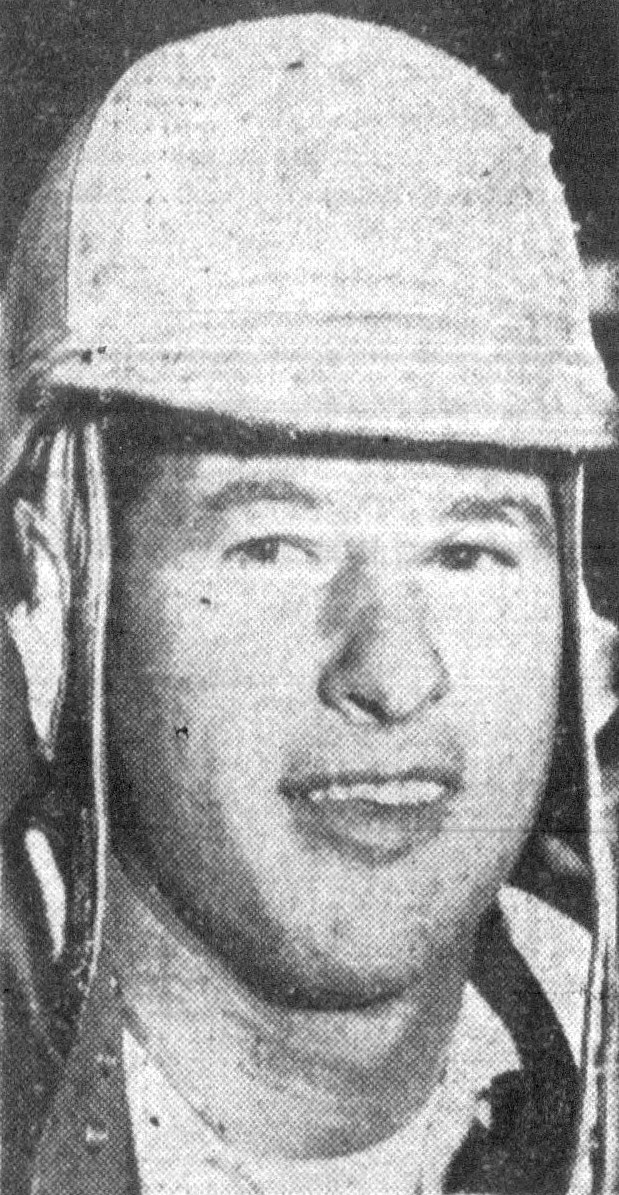
- Ward, circa 1950
- Born: Rodger Morris Ward; January 10, 1921 Beloit, Kansas, U.S.
- Died: July 5, 2004 (aged 83) Anaheim, California, U.S.

Championship titles
- AAA Stock Car (1951); USAC Championship Car (1959, 1962); Major victories Indianapolis 500 (1959, 1962)

Champ Car career
- 150 races run over 17 years
- Best finish: 1st (1959, 1962)
- First race: 1950 Phoenix 100 (Phoenix)
- Last race: 1966 Indianapolis 500 (Indianapolis)
- First win: 1953 Springfield 100 (Springfield)
- Last win: 1966 Trenton 150 (Trenton)
Wins	Podiums	Poles
26	47	11

NASCAR Cup Series career
- 3 races run over 2 years
- First race: 1963 Daytona Qualifier #2 (Daytona)
- Last race: 1964 Motor Trend 500 (Riverside)
Wins	Top tens	Poles
0	0	0

Formula One World Championship career
- Nationality: (United States) American
- Active years: 1951 – 1960, 1963
- Team(s): Bromme, Kurtis Kraft, Pawl, Kuzma, Lesovsky, Watson, Lotus
- Entries: 12
- Championships: 0
- Wins: 1
- Podiums: 2
- Career points: 14
- Pole positions: 0
- Fastest laps: 0
- First entry: 1951 Indianapolis 500
- First win: 1959 Indianapolis 500
- Last entry: 1963 United States Grand Prix

Rodger Morris Ward (January 10, 1921 – July 5, 2004) was an American racing driver best known for his open-wheel career. He is generally regarded as one of the finest drivers of his generation, and is best known for winning two National Championships, and two Indianapolis 500s, both in 1959 and 1962. He also won the AAA National Stock Car Championship in 1951.

== Early life ==
Ward was born in Beloit, Kansas, the son of Ralph and Geneva (née Banta) Ward. By 1930, the family had moved to California. He died in Anaheim, California.

Ward's father owned an auto wrecking business in Los Angeles. Rodger was 14 years old when he built a Ford hot rod. He was a P-38 Lightning fighter pilot in World War II. He enjoyed flying so much he thought of making it his career. He began to fly B-17 Flying Fortress and was so good he was retained as an instructor. After the war he was stationed in Wichita Falls, Texas when a quarter mile dirt track was built.

== Driving career ==
=== Midget car career ===
Ward began racing midget cars in 1946 after he was discharged from the Army. He finished poorly. His skills improved in 1947 and by 1948 he won the San Diego Grand Prix. He raced in an Offenhauser in 1949 and won several races.

Ward shocked the midget car racing world when he broke Offenhauser motor's long winning streak by using Vic Edelbrock's Ford 60 "shaker" motor at Gilmore Stadium on August 10, 1950. The motor was one of the first to feature nitromethane for fuel. Ward and Edelbrock went to the Orange Show Stadium the following night and won again.

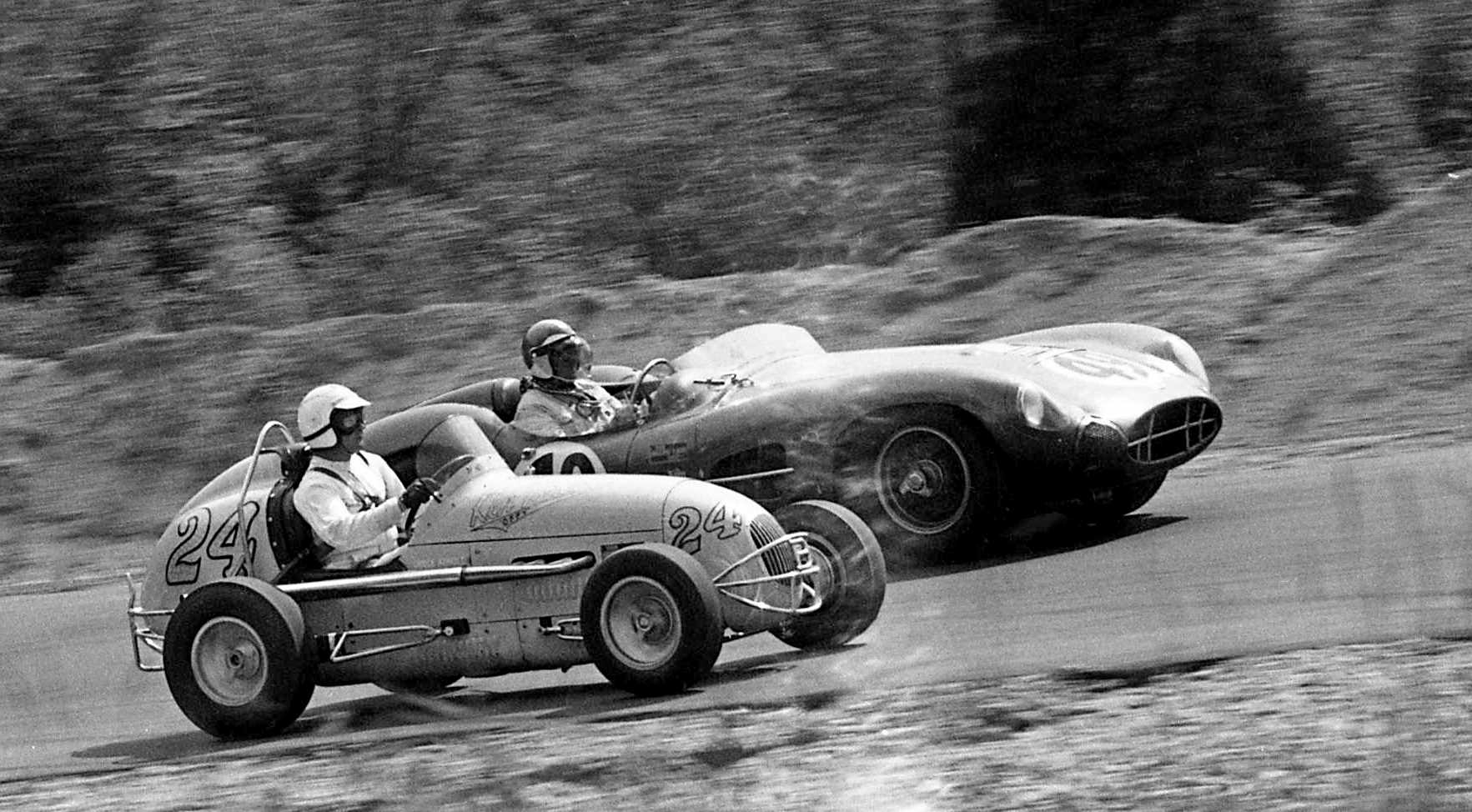
Ward (24) battles George Constantine at Lime Rock Park

Ward drove Ken Brenn's Offy midget July 25, 1959 to beat the top expensive and exotic sports cars in a Formula Libre race at Lime Rock Park. Midget cars were normally considered competitive for oval tracks only before that time. Later that year, Ward entered the United States Grand Prix for Formula One cars with the midget car, under the false belief that it was much quicker through the turns, a fact he found not true at the beginning of practice. He eventually retired from the race after twenty laps with a mechanical failure.

=== Stock Car career ===
Ward participated in the AAA and later USAC Stock Car divisions. He started no less than 66 races, winning seven, and finishing in the top-five no less than 29 times. He won the AAA National Stock Car title in 1951. Ward made a handful of NASCAR starts, his first being an attempt the 1963 Daytona 500, where he finished 27th in his qualifying race due to an engine issues and failed to make the race. He also competed in the Atlanta 500 at Atlanta International Raceway, finishing 27th due to engine issues, and in the 1964 Motor Trend 500 at Riverside International Raceway, finishing 38th due to transmission issues. Ward competed in two NASCAR Winston West Series races in 1974, finishing 22nd at Altamont Speedway due to overheating issues and seventeenth in the following race at Clovis Speedway due to transmission issues.

=== Championship car career ===
Ward's AAA Stock Car championship gave him an opportunity for a rookie test at the 1951 Indianapolis 500. He passed the test and qualified for the race. He finished 34 laps before his car suffered a broken oil line. He finished 130 laps in the 1952 Indianapolis 500 before the oil pressure failed. His 1953 Indianapolis 500 ended after 170 laps, and his 1954 Indianapolis 500 ended after his car stalled on the backstretch. He completed all of the laps for the first time in 1956, finishing eighth.

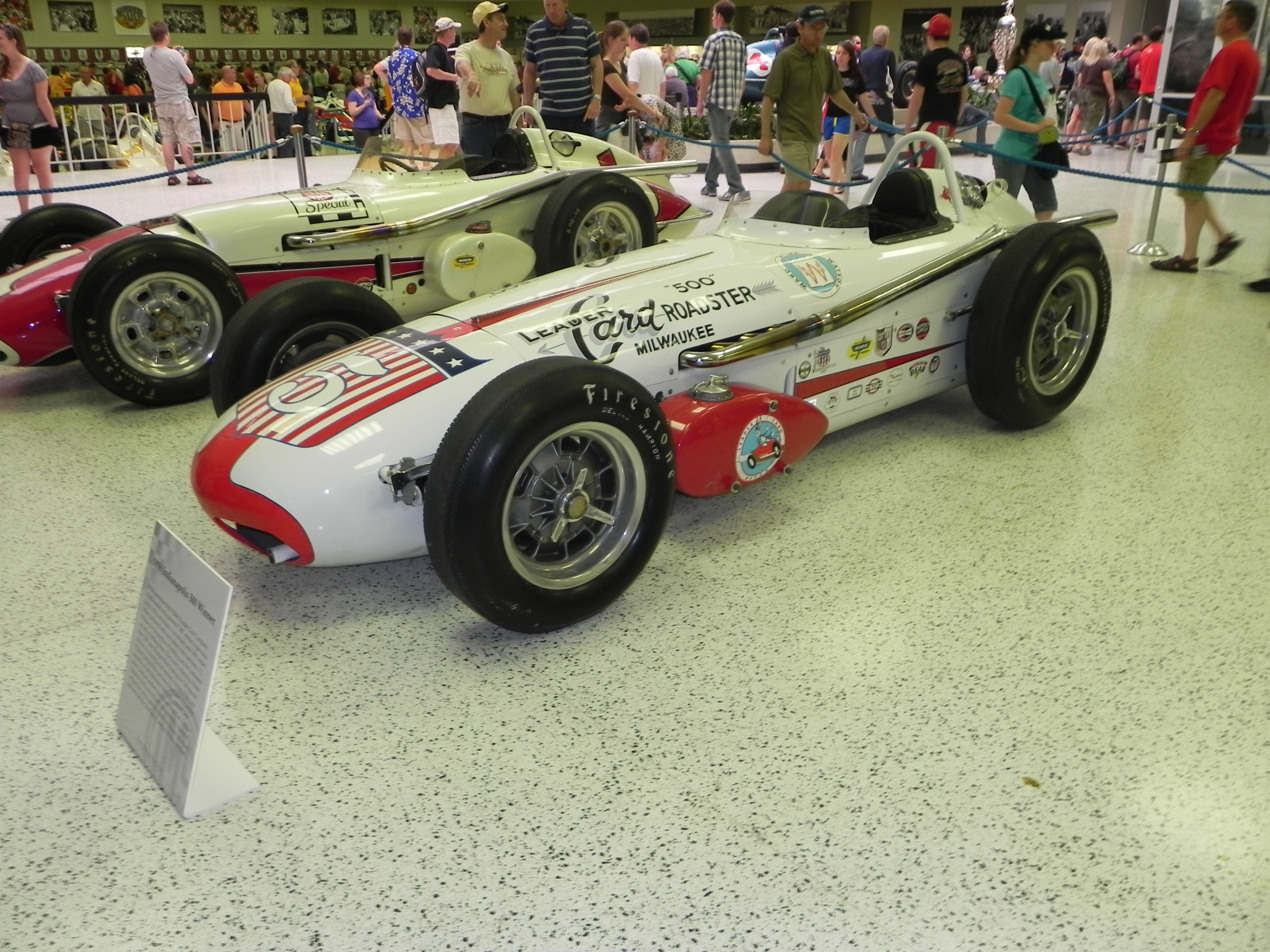
Ward's winning car from the 1959 Indianapolis 500

In 1959, Ward joined the Leader Card Racers team with owner Bob Wilke and mechanic A. J. Watson; forming what was known as the "3 W's". Ward won his first Indianapolis 500. He won the USAC National Championship with victories at Milwaukee, DuQuoin and the Indy Fairgrounds. His 1959 season ended by competing in the only United States Grand Prix held at Sebring Raceway.

Ward battled Jim Rathmann for the lead in the 1960 Indianapolis 500. In one of the epic duels in Indy 500 history, Ward and Rathmann exchanged the lead 14 times before Ward slowed on lap 197 to nurse his frayed right front tire to the finish. Rathmann, also struggling with worn-out tires after such a furious pace, took the lead on lap 197 and the two drivers limped home in what is still regarded as one of the greatest duels for the win in Indianapolis 500 history.

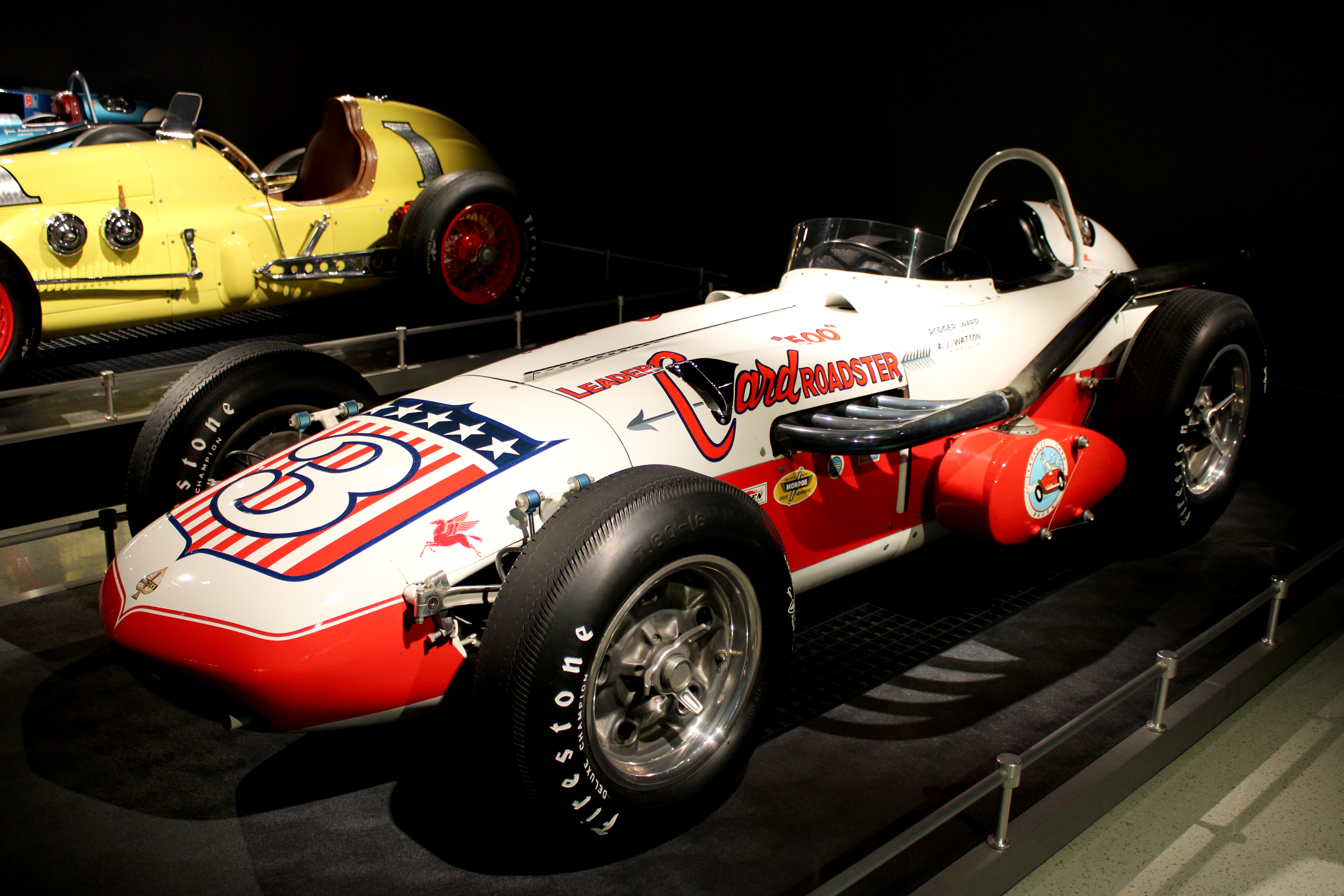
Ward's winning car from the 1962 Indianapolis 500

Ward took the lead at the 1962 Indianapolis 500 at lap 126 and led the rest of the race. He also won the season championship that year.

In the midst of the Lotus-Ford rear-engine invasion in 1964, car owner/chief mechanic A. J. Watson built the first rear-engined Watson, mated to the four-cam Ford. But the night before the 1964 Indianapolis 500, Ward and Watson made a highly uncharacteristic strategic error. Going against the strong recommendation (read: orders) from Ford to use gasoline fuel instead of the cooler-burning but more powerful methanol/gasoline. The car was fast, but the jetting mistake left Ward having to pit every 20 laps for fuel. Later Ward calculated that he had spent two minutes less on the track than winner A. J. Foyt, yet only lost the race by approximately one minute.

In addition, the horrific second-lap accident, in which his friends Dave MacDonald and Eddie Sachs both perished in a fiery, gasoline-fueled wreck, left an indelible impression on Ward. After a difficult month of May, 1965, Ward suffered the embarrassment of failing to qualify. Ward left the Leader Card team mid-season and joined Mecom Racing team owned by John W. Mecom Jr. In 1966 Ward won the second race of the season at Trenton driving a supercharged Offy powered Lola.

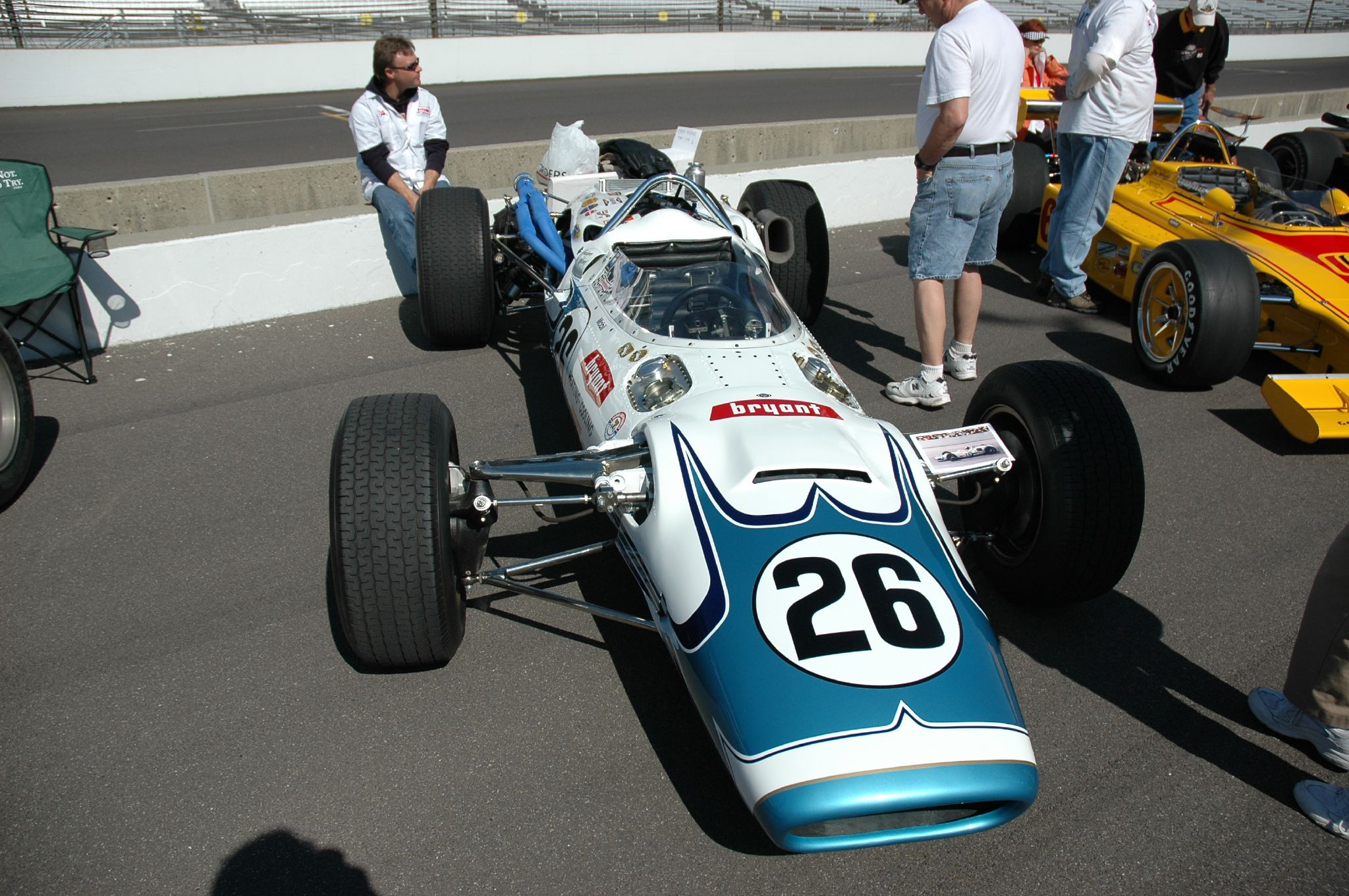
The Lola-Offenhauser that Ward drove in his final Championship Car race, the 1966 Indianapolis 500

For his Indianapolis 500 effort, Ward drove the same car but retired while running 15th with handling problems listed as the cause. The fact that late race attrition reduced the race to only five cars would have provided him a good finish as long as he was running and in fact he had been faster than the winner. Ward had parked a running car 74 laps into the race and was considering his future. At the banquet, Ward stood at the podium and made a painful announcement to the crowd: "I always said I'd quit racing when it stopped being fun," he said. He paused as he wiped away tears. "Today it wasn't fun anymore." He had 26 victories in his 150 starts between 1950 and 1966, and he finished in the top ten in more than half of his starts.

=== World Drivers' Championship career ===
The AAA/USAC-sanctioned Indianapolis 500 was included in the FIA World Drivers' Championship from 1950 through 1960. Drivers competing at Indianapolis during those years were credited with World Drivers' Championship points and participation in addition to those which they received towards the AAA/USAC National Championship.

Ward participated in ten World Drivers' Championship races at Indianapolis. He was also among a small number of USAC/Indianapolis drivers to start an FIA-sanctioned World Drivers' Championship event during the 1950-1960 period - competing for Leader Card Racers in the 1959 United States Grand Prix.

Ward also participated in the 1963 United States Grand Prix. During his World Drivers' Championship career, Ward won once, finished in the top three twice, and accumulated 14 World Drivers' Championship points.

== Post-racing career ==
Ward retired to be a commentator for ABC's Wide World of Sports for NASCAR and Indycars from 1965 to 1970. From 1980-1985, he served as a driver expert for the Indianapolis Motor Speedway Radio Network, before retiring in Tustin, California. With the help of the Mattioli Family, Ward helped design the Pocono Raceway in Long Pond, Pennsylvania. A unique course that resulted in a triangle shape, he designed the track after five corners of tracks he liked to race at, Trenton, Indianapolis, and Milwaukee. The track is still popular today.

In later years, Ward served as public relations director for the new Ontario Motor Speedway, and later managed the Circus Circus unlimited hydroplane team. He died on July 5, 2004, aged 83.

Ward also appeared on the TV show To Tell the Truth in 1962.

== Awards and honors ==
Ward has been inducted into the following halls of fame:

- Auto Racing Hall of Fame (1981)
- International Motorsports Hall of Fame (1992)
- Motorsports Hall of Fame of America (1995)
- National Midget Auto Racing Hall of Fame (1995)
- West Coast Stock Car/Motorsports Hall of Fame (2003)

== Motorsports career results ==
=== AAA/USAC Championship Car results ===
Year	1	2	3	4	5	6	7	8	9	10	11	12	13	14	15	16	17	18	Pos	Points
1950	INDY	MIL	LAN	SPR	MIL	PIK	SYR	DET	SPR	SAC	PHX; 10	BAY	DAR						47th	30
1951	INDY; 27	MIL; 5	LAN; 13	DAR; DNS	SPR; DNQ	MIL	DUQ	DUQ	PIK	SYR	DET	DNC; 8	SJS; 17	PHX; 10	BAY; 17				30th	192
1952	INDY; 23	MIL; DNQ	RAL; 9	SPR; DNQ	MIL; 7	DET; 16	DUQ	PIK	SYR; 13	DNC; DNQ	SJS; 18	PHX; 9							23rd	240
1953	INDY; 16	MIL; 18	SPR; 1	DET; 1	SPR; 17	MIL; 6	DUQ; DNQ	PIK	SYR; 7	ISF; 8	SAC; 13	PHX; 18							11th	540.2
1954	INDY; 22	MIL; 10	LAN; 16	DAR; DNQ	SPR; 15	MIL; 26	DUQ; 11	PIK	SYR; 18	ISF; 9	SAC; 13	PHX; DNQ	LVG; 4						23rd	210
1955	INDY; 28	MIL; DNQ	LAN; 9	SPR; DNQ	MIL; 24	DUQ; DNQ	PIK	SYR; 9	ISF; 14	SAC	PHX; 6								17th	252.2
1956	INDY; 8	MIL; DNP	LAN; DNS	DAR; 19	ATL; 16	SPR; 6	MIL; 3	DUQ; DNQ	SYR; 10	ISF; 3	SAC; 16	PHX; 19							8th	862
1957	INDY; 30	LAN; DNQ	MIL; 1	DET; 16	ATL; 16	SPR; 1	MIL; 18	DUQ; 3	SYR; 18	ISF; 13	TRE; 20	SAC; 1	PHX; 13						11th	740
1958	TRE; 11	INDY; 20	MIL; 19	LAN; DNQ	ATL; 7	SPR; 16	MIL; 1	DUQ; 4	SYR; 4	ISF; 3	TRE; 1	SAC; 16	PHX; 5						5th	1,160
1959	DAY; 2	TRE; 2	INDY; 1	MIL; 13	LAN	SPR; 18	MIL; 1	DUQ; 1	SYR; 3	ISF; 1	TRE; 18	SAC; 3	PHX; 17						1st	2,400
1960	TRE; 1	INDY; 2	MIL; 1	LAN	SPR; DNQ	MIL; 21	DUQ; 16	SYR; 18	ISF; 14	TRE; 2	SAC; 17	PHX; 10							2nd	1,390
1961	TRE; 18	INDY; 3	MIL; 1	LAN	MIL; 19	SPR; 6	DUQ; 17	SYR; 1	ISF; 17	TRE; 3	SAC; 1	PHX; 2							3rd	1,680
1962	TRE; 3	INDY; 1	MIL; 4	LAN	TRE; 1	SPR; 17	MIL; 1	LAN	SYR; 1	ISF; 5	TRE; 5	SAC	PHX						1st	2,460
1963	TRE; 18	INDY; 4	MIL; 1	LAN	TRE; 3	SPR; 1	MIL; 4	DUQ; 2	ISF; 1	TRE; 26	SAC; 1	PHX; 1							2nd	2,210
1964	PHX; 5	TRE; 18	INDY; 2	MIL; 13	LAN	TRE; 7	SPR; 15	MIL; 2	DUQ; 13	ISF; 2	TRE; 4	SAC; 4	PHX; 2						2nd	2,128
1965	PHX; 11	TRE; 20	INDY; DNQ	MIL; 22	LAN; DNQ	PIP	TRE; DNQ	IRP; 24	ATL	LAN	MIL; 22	SPR	MIL; 23	DUQ	ISF	TRE; 23	SAC	PHX; 15	48th	30
1966	PHX; 2	TRE; 1	INDY; 15	MIL	LAN	ATL	PIP	IRP	LAN	SPR	MIL	DUQ	ISF	TRE	SAC	PHX			15th	540

=== Indianapolis 500 results ===
Year	Car	Start	Qual	Rank	Finish	Laps	Led	Retired
1951	48	25	134.867	7	27	34	0	Oil line
1952	34	22	134.139	28	23	130	0	Oil pressure
1953	92	10	137.468	6	16	177	0	Stalled
1954	12	16	139.297	8	22	172	0	Engine
1955	27	30	135.049	30	28	53	0	Crash BS
1956	19	15	141.171	27	8	200	0	Running
1957	8	24	141.321	15	30	27	0	Supercharger
1958	8	11	143.266	14	20	93	0	Fuel pump
1959	5	6	144.035	7	1st	200	130	Running
1960	1	3	145.560	5	2nd	200	58	Running
1961	2	4	146.187	5	3rd	200	7	Running
1962	3	2	149.371	2	1st	200	66	Running
1963	1	4	149.800	6	4	200	0	Running
1964	2	3	156.406	3	2nd	200	0	Running
1965	2	DNQ						Too Slow
1966	26	13	159.468	19	15	74	0	Handling
Totals						2160	261	

Starts	15
Poles	0
Front Row	3
Wins	2
Top 5	6
Top 10	7
Retired	8
Did not qualify	1

- Ward's finishes from 1959 to 1963 and 1960 to 1964 rank as the best and second best five-race finishing streaks in Indianapolis 500 history.

=== FIA World Drivers' Championship results ===
(key)

Year	Entrant	Chassis	Engine	1	2	3	4	5	6	7	8	9	10	11	WDC	Points
1951	L & B Bromme	Bromme	Offenhauser	SUI	500; 27	BEL	FRA	GBR	GER	ITA	ESP				NC	0
1952	Federal Auto Associates	Kurtis Kraft 4000	Offenhauser	SUI	500; 23	BEL	FRA	GBR	GER	NED	ITA				NC	0
1953	M. A. Walker	Kurtis Kraft	Offenhauser	ARG	500; 16	NED	BEL	FRA	GBR	GER	SUI	ITA			NC	0
1954	R. N. Sabourin	Pawl	Offenhauser	ARG	500; 22	BEL	FRA	GBR	GER	SUI	ITA	ESP			NC	0
1955	E. R. Casale	Kuzma	Offenhauser	ARG	MON	500; 28	BEL	NED	GBR	ITA					NC	0
1956	Ed Walsh	Kurtis Kraft 500C	Offenhauser	ARG	MON	500; 8	BEL	FRA	GBR	GER	ITA				NC	0
1957	Roger Wolcott	Lesovsky	Offenhauser	ARG	MON	500; 30	FRA	GBR	GER	PES	ITA				NC	0
1958	Roger Wolcott	Lesovsky	Offenhauser	ARG	MON	NED	500; 20	BEL	FRA	GBR	GER	POR	ITA	MOR	NC	0
1959	Leader Cards Inc.	Watson	Offenhauser	MON	500; 1										10th	8
1959	Leader Cards Inc.	Kurtis Kraft	Offenhauser			NED	FRA	GBR	GER	POR	ITA	USA; Ret			10th	8
1960	Leader Cards Inc.	Watson	Offenhauser	ARG	MON	500; 2	NED	BEL	FRA	GBR	POR	ITA	USA		12th	6
1963	Reg Parnell Racing	Lotus 24	BRM V8	MON	BEL	NED	FRA	GBR	GER	ITA	USA; Ret	MEX	RSA		NC	0

Preceded by Jimmy Bryan	Indianapolis 500 Winner; 1959	Succeeded by Jim Rathmann
Preceded by A. J. Foyt	Indianapolis 500 Winner; 1962	Succeeded by Parnelli Jones

Sporting positions
Preceded by Jay Frank	AAA Stock Car Champion; 1951	Succeeded by Marshall Teague
