= Pawl (constructor) =

Racing car constructor

Pawl was an American racing car constructor, who competed in three rounds of the FIA World Championship - the 1951, 1954 and 1955 Indy 500.

== FIA World Championship Indy 500 results ==
Season	Driver	Grid	Classification	Points	Note	Race Report
1951	Jimmy Davies	27	Ret		Axle	Report
1954	Rodger Ward	16	Ret		Retirement	Report
1955	Eddie Russo	13	Ret		Ignition	Report
