= A. J. Shepherd =

American racing driver

- Full name: Alvin Junior Shepherd
- Born: June 11, 1926 Chester, Arkansas, United States
- Died: May 8, 2005 (aged 78) Miami, Oklahoma, United States

USAC Championship Car
- Years active: 1960–1961
- Starts: 7
- Wins: 0
- Poles: 0
- Best finish: 4th (1961, Springfield)

Previous series
- 1950s: IMCA and CRA

Alvin Junior "A. J." Shepherd (June 11, 1926 – May 8, 2005) was an American race car driver.

== Career ==
Born in Chester, Arkansas, Shepherd drove in the USAC Championship Car series, racing in the 1960–1961 seasons with seven starts, including the 1961 Indianapolis 500. He finished in the top-ten four times, with his best finish in fourth position, in 1961 at Springfield. He finished 26th in his only race at Indy. He also raced in the IMCA circuit in the 1950s, and CRA California.

== Death ==
Shepherd died in Miami, Oklahoma after living much of his life in Wichita, Kansas.
