= Howard J. Osborn =

Central Intelligence Agency officer and member of Watergate scandal

- Born: Howard Jenkins Osborn; March 8, 1918; New Jersey, U.S.
- Died: May 14, 1984 (aged 66); Arlington County, Virginia, U.S.
- Occupation: Former Central Intelligence Agency Director of Security
- Known for: The Pennington Matter
- Military career
- Branch: United States Army
- Rank: Major
- Unit: United States Army Reserve

Howard J. Osborn was a former director of security at the Central Intelligence Agency who was forced to resign because he withheld documents from the FBI and the Watergate Congressional Committee. He withheld a memorandum detailing a visit by Lee R. Pennington, Jr. to the residence of Watergate burglar James W. McCord, Jr. shortly after the Watergate break-in. At McCord's home, Pennington witnessed McCord's wife burning documents which might have shown a link between McCord and the CIA.

== Early life and education ==
Osborn was born in New Jersey on March 6, 1918, the son of Eugene Chester Osborn and Jessie Everett Turner Osborn. In 1922, the family moved to Hamburg, New York, where Osborn attend school and graduated from Hamburg High School with classmate E. Howard Hunt in 1936. Osborn attended the University of Michigan and graduated from Virginia Polytechnic Institute.

== Career ==
=== World War II ===
Osborn was commissioned US Army 2nd Lieutenant at Fort Monroe in Hampton, Virginia, on July 22, 1941. He served 5 years and was discharged as a Major in 1946.

=== CIA career ===
Osborn was employed by the CIA for 27 years, from 1947 to 1974. He was Director of Security from July 1, 1964, until March 8, 1974, when he went on sick leave and retired the following December 31. Most of Osborn's work at the CIA is shrouded in the CIA's veil of secrecy. Some of his activities have been revealed through release of documents and his testimony at congressional hearings.

==== Oleg Penkovsky ====
In a May 23, 1963, Memo to the deputy director of Plans, Osborn, then Chief of the SR (Soviet-Russian) Division, wrote regarding Oleg Penkovsky: "we have concluded that there is no possibility that this case represents planned deception, build-up for deception, fabrication, or double agent activity. Rather it represents the most serious penetration of Soviet officialdom ever accomplished and one that will hurt them for years to come." Penkovsky had been supplying American and British intelligence officials with information for 18 months from April 1961 to October 1962 when he was arrested, tried and executed on May 16, 1963.

==== Call to Richard Helms ====
On the night of the Watergate burglary, Osborn called CIA Director Richard Helms at home to inform him that five men had been arrested in a break-in at the Democratic Party National Headquarters at the Watergate. He told Helms that the group included James McCord who had retired from the CIA two years prior and had been supervised by Osborn when McCord was employed at the CIA. He also told Helms that former CIA officer Howard Hunt was involved in some way, this was before the police knew Hunt was involved.

==== Pennington matter ====
Lee R. Pennington, Jr., an old family friend of the Ruth and James McCord, visited the McCord home shortly after the Watergate scandal. There he witnessed Ruth McCord burning documents which he thought might have linked the CIA to Watergate. He reported the incident to his CIA bosses and a CIA memo was written. Osborn withheld the memo about the Pennington visit from the CIA report which was furnished to the United States Senate Watergate Committee. The Pennington memo was eventually provided to the committee and Osborn was forced to retire over the matter.

==== Rockefeller Commission ====
On February 17, 1975, Osborn testified for three hours behind a closed door session of the United States President's Commission on CIA Activities within the United States, known as the Rockefeller Commission.

Osborn's remarks have never been made public, however, CIA Director William Colby has acknowledged that Osborn's Office of Security was responsible for inserting agents into dissident organizations to gather information relating to plans for demonstrations, pickets, protests or break-ins. Another operation under Osborn's security office involved surreptitious entry into the homes and offices of agency employees and former employees suspected of security violations.

==== HTLINGUAL ====
From 1952 to 1973, the CIA was involved in a mail opening project called HTLINGUAL. On October 21, 1975, Osborn voluntarily appeared before the US Senate Select Committee investigating Intelligence activities, known as the Church Committee, with regards to mail opening. In his testimony, Osborn revealed that the CIA was not only removing letters from the Post Office for photocopying and examining the exteriors of the letters, it also opened some of the mail without the Post Office's knowledge, and had at least on one occasion, opened and copied a letter to an unnamed US Congressman. These operations were being conducted in New York City and San Francisco. Osborn acknowledged that he knew what the CIA was doing was illegal.

== Personal life ==
Osborn married Elizabeth Erskine of Oakland, California on December 12, 1942, in Westport, Connecticut. They had three children, a daughter and two sons.

== Death ==
Osborn died May 14, 1984, from lung cancer and is buried in Arlington National Cemetery.
