= Cliff Griffith =

American racing driver (1916–1996)

- Born: Clifton Reign Griffith; February 6, 1916 Nineveh, Indiana, U.S.
- Died: January 23, 1996 (aged 79) Rochester, Indiana, U.S.

Champ Car career
- 18 races run over 12 years
- Years active: 1950–1954, 1956–1957, 1960–1964
- Best finish: 19th – 1951
- First race: 1950 Springfield 100 (Springfield)
- Last race: 1961 Indianapolis 500 (Indianapolis)
Wins	Podiums	Poles
0	0	1

Formula One World Championship career
- Active years: 1950–1954, 1956–1957
- Team(s): Kurtis Kraft, Stevens, Miller
- Entries: 7 (3 starts)
- Championships: 0
- Wins: 0
- Podiums: 0
- Career points: 0
- Pole positions: 0
- Fastest laps: 0
- First entry: 1950 Indianapolis 500
- Last entry: 1957 Indianapolis 500

Cliff Griffith (February 6, 1916 in Nineveh, Indiana – January 23, 1996 in Rochester, Indiana) was an American racecar driver.

Griffith served in the United States Army during the Second World War.

Griffith drove in the AAA and USAC Championship Car series, racing in the 1950–1952, 1956 and 1961 seasons with 19 starts, including the Indianapolis 500 races in each of those years except 1950. He finished in the top-ten eight times, with his best finish in fourth position, in 1950 at Springfield. His best Indy finish was ninth in 1952.

Prior to joining USAC, Griffith won a pair of championships on the Midwest Dirt Track Racing Association circuit behind the wheel of Hector Honore's legendary sprint car known as the "Black Deuce".

== Indy 500 results ==
Year	Car	Start	Qual	Rank	Finish	Laps	Led	Retired
1951	23	18	133.839	13	28	30	0	Rear axle
1952	22	9	136.617	6	9	200	0	Running
1956	27	30	141.471	24	10	199	0	Flagged
1961	26	30	145.038	19	24	55	0	Piston
Totals						484	0	

Starts	4
Poles	0
Front Row	0
Wins	0
Top 5	0
Top 10	2
Retired	2

== World Championship career summary ==
The Indianapolis 500 was part of the FIA World Championship from 1950 through 1960. Drivers competing at Indy during those years were credited with World Championship points and participation. Griffith participated in three World Championship races. He started on the pole 0 times, won 0 races, set 0 fastest laps, and finished on the podium 0 times. He accumulated a total of 0 championship points.
