= Ed Kostenuk =

Canadian racing driver

Ed Kostenuk (October 12, 1925 in Victoria, British Columbia – September 2, 1997) was a former USAC IndyCar racecar driver.

Kostenuk made six starts from 1962 to 1964 with a best finish of eleventh place. He failed to qualify for the 1962 Indianapolis 500.

== See also ==
- List of Canadians in Champ Car
