= Ebb Rose =

American racing driver (1925–2007)

- Born: Jesse Ethelbert Rose; February 27, 1925; Houston, Texas, U.S.
- Died: August 27, 2007 (aged 82); Houston, Texas, U.S.
- Occupations: Race car driver, businessman

Jesse Ethelbert "Ebb" Rose (February 27, 1925, Houston, Texas – August 27, 2007) was an American race car driver from Texas. He was also a rancher, a mechanic, a pilot, and a rodeo rider, alongside career in business.

Rose was from Houston, the son of J. H. Rose Jr. and Lauretta Ruth Moore Rose. His father founded a trucking company, which Rose took over later in life. He raced in the USAC Championship Car series in the 1961–1963 seasons, with four career starts, including the 1961–1963 Indianapolis 500 races. His best finish at Indy was in 14th position in both 1962 and 1963. Outside his career in sports, Rose owned a car dealership in Houston. He also owned a horse ranch in New Mexico.

He married Gloria Jean Allen Rose in 1942, and had three children; his only son Jesse died in 1992, his daughter Jeanene died in 1995, and his wife died in 2003; he died in 2007, in Houston.

== Indy 500 results ==
Year	Chassis	Engine	Start	Finish
1960	Moore	Offy	Failed to qualify	
1961	Porter	Offy	19th	23rd
1962	Porter	Offy	32nd	14th
1963	Watson	Offy	32nd	14th
1965	Philipp	Offy	Practice crash	
1967	Mallard	Offy	Practice crash	
