= Norm Hall =

American racecar driver

Norm Hall (May 14, 1926 – March 11, 1992), was an American racecar driver.

Born in San Francisco, California, Hall died in Pittsboro, Indiana. He drove in the USAC Championship Car series, racing in the 1961, 1964, and 1965 seasons, with 17 career starts, including the Indianapolis 500 races in 1961 and 1964. He finished in the top-ten eight times, with his best finish in fifth position twice in 1965, both at Trenton.
