= 1963 Indianapolis 500 =

American motor race

47th Indianapolis 500
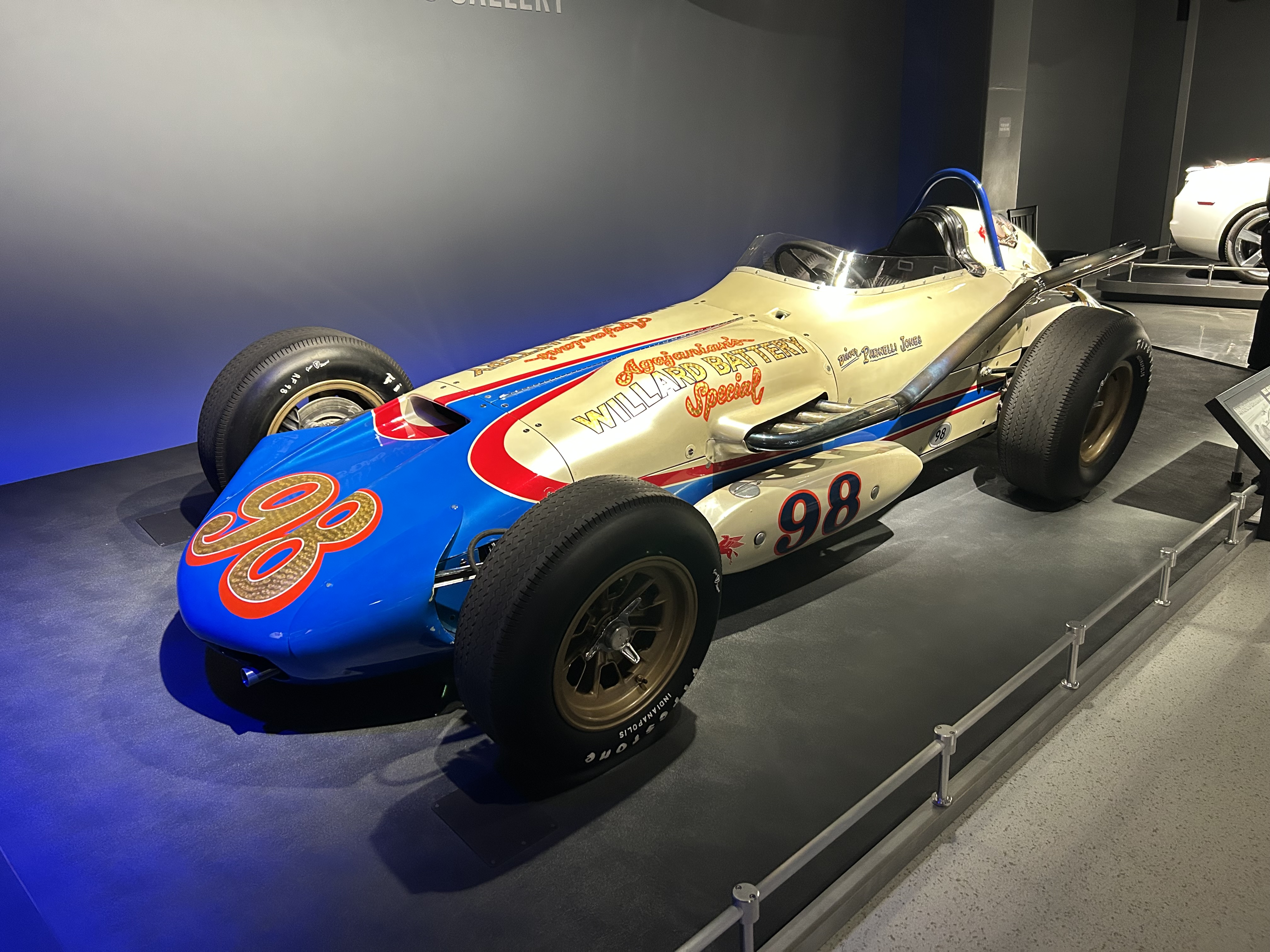

Indianapolis Motor Speedway

Indianapolis 500
- Sanctioning body: USAC
- Season: 1963 USAC season
- Date: May 30, 1963
- Winner: Parnelli Jones
- Winning team: Agajanian Racing Enterprises
- Winning Chief Mechanic: Johnny Pouelsen
- Time of race: 3:29:35.20
- Average speed: 143.137 mph (230.357 km/h)
- Pole position: Parnelli Jones
- Pole speed: 151.153 mph (243.257 km/h)
- Fastest qualifier: Parnelli Jones
- Rookie of the Year: Jim Clark
- Most laps led: Parnelli Jones (167)

Pre-race ceremonies
- National anthem: Purdue Band
- "Back Home Again in Indiana": Brian Sullivan
- Starting command: Tony Hulman
- Pace car: Chrysler 300
- Pace car driver: Sam Hanks
- Starter: Pat Vidan
- Honorary referee: Baxter F. Ball
- Estimated attendance: 250,000

Chronology
Previous	Next
1962	1964

The 47th International 500-Mile Sweepstakes was held at the Indianapolis Motor Speedway in Speedway, Indiana on Thursday, May 30, 1963. Rufus Parnelli Jones took his only Indy 500 win. This win was controversial because his car (nicknamed "Calhoun") spewed oil from a cracked overflow tank for many laps, which allegedly caused at least one driver to spin and crash. USAC officials put off black-flagging Jones after car owner J. C. Agajanian ran down pit lane and convinced them that the oil leak was below the level of a known crack and would not leak any further. Lotus owner Colin Chapman, whose English-built, rear-engined Lotus-Ford finished second in the hands of Scotsman Jim Clark, accused USAC officials of being biased in favor of the American driver and car.

The non-black flagging of Jones remains controversial. Many, including Chapman and writer Brock Yates, believed that officials would have black flagged Jones if an American driver and car had been in second place instead of Clark in the British built Lotus. Goodyear arrived at the track and supplied tires for some entries, but participated only in practice. No cars used Goodyear tires during time trials or the race itself. It was the first time since about 1921 that Goodyear attempted to compete at Indy. Goodyear had last won the race in 1919.

== Time trials ==
Time trials was scheduled for four days.

- Saturday May 18 – Pole Day time trials
  - A huge crowd came on Pole Day to see potential records with some speculating there would be speeds over 152 MPH, but windy and gusty conditions kept speeds down. Dan Gurney's practice crash created problems for the Lotus team and required Gurney to later qualify and race the team's spare car. Jim McElreath was the first qualifier but all eyes were on Parnelli Jones who went out third and set the early pace with a track record of 151.153 MPH, including a one lap track record of 151.847 which would turn out to be enough for the pole. Several wave-offs followed before Jim Hurtubise, driving a popular Novi, and Don Branson filled out the front row with runs over 150 MPH. Jim Clark qualified fifth fastest in the Lotus-Ford. The day ended with 1962 winner Rodger Ward qualifying 4th fastest and 7 cars having qualified for the race.
- Sunday May 19 – Second day time trials
  - Better Conditions on the second day saw increased track activity. The morning practice saw Jack Turner involved in a bad crash, he suffered third degree burns and announced his retirement later that day while in Methodist Hospital. A. J. Foyt set the pace with a run of 150.615 after having waived his run on pole day with other big name drivers such as Dan Gurney, Eddie Sachs and Paul Goldsmith also qualifying. Duane Carter and Masten Gregory qualified two of Mickey Thompson's radical “rollerskate” cars while Pedro Rodriguez, driving an Aston Martin powered Cooper, was slowest in the field. At the end of the day there were 18 cars qualified, 5 of which qualified over 150 MPH.
- Saturday May 25 – Third day time trials
  - The third day of qualifying was very busy with 31 cars in line at the start of the day. Rookie Bobby Unser, driving a Novi was the first to qualify and would end up being the fastest of the day. Other big names to qualify during the day included Lloyd Ruby, Jim Rathmann, Dick Rathmann, and Len Sutton with a slow run in a Leader Card entry. Bud Tingelstad filled the field to 33 cars and the day concluded with Johnny Rutherford bumping Pedro Rodriguez and Bob Christie bumping Chuck Rodee.
- Sunday May 26 – Fourth day time trials
  - The final day of qualifying opened with 16 cars preparing to qualify and Ebb Rose on the bubble. Heavy winds meant few cars went out early in the day before Troy Ruttman bumped Rose in mid afternoon and Al Miller, in a third Mickey Thompson car, bumped Len Sutton with the fastest run of the day. In the final half hour Ralph Liguori just bumped Masten Gregory but immediately found himself on the bubble. Len Sutton then set a near identical time to Liguori's and, while officials were figuring out if Sutton had bumped Liguori, Ebb Rose went out in A. J. Foyt's backup car and went even faster, eliminating both Sutton and Liguori. As time expired Masten Gregory went out in another Thompson car but was unable to bump Dempsey Wilson.

== Starting grid ==
Row	Inside		Middle		Outside	
1	98	(United States) Parnelli Jones	56	(United States) Jim Hurtubise	4	(United States) Don Branson
2	1	(United States) Rodger Ward W	92	(United Kingdom) Jim Clark R	8	(United States) Jim McElreath
3	5	(United States) Bobby Marshman	2	(United States) A. J. Foyt W	99	(United States) Paul Goldsmith
4	9	(United States) Eddie Sachs	10	(United States) Chuck Hulse	93	(United States) Dan Gurney
5	35	(United States) Allen Crowe	14	(United States) Roger McCluskey	83	(United States) Duane Carter
6	6	(United States) Bobby Unser R	22	(United States) Dick Rathmann	65	(United States) Bob Christie
7	52	(United States) Lloyd Ruby	26	(United States) Bobby Grim	88	(United States) Eddie Johnson
8	45	(United States) Chuck Stevenson	75	(United States) Art Malone R	86	(United States) Bob Veith
9	54	(United States) Bud Tingelstad	37	(United States) Johnny Rutherford R	23	(United States) Johnny Boyd
10	21	(United States) Elmer George	16	(United States) Jim Rathmann W	29	(United States) Dempsey Wilson
11	84	(United States) Al Miller R	32	(United States) Ebb Rose	17	(United States) Troy Ruttman W

R Indianapolis 500 rookie
W Indianapolis 500 winner

=== Alternates ===
- First alternate: Len Sutton (#7, #47)

=== Failed to qualify ===
- Bill Cheesbourg (#27)
- Jack Conely R (#89)
- Ray Crawford (#47)
- Jimmy Davies (#63)
- Jimmy Daywalt (#25)
- Ronnie Duman R (#15)
- Chuck Engle R (#77)
- Cotton Farmer R (#25) – Withdrew, injured
- Don Freeland (#62)
- Masten Gregory R (#82)
- Cliff Griffith (#72)
- Norm Hall (#61)
- Bob Harkey R (#31)
- Gene Hartley – Retired
- Graham Hill R (#83)
- Bruce Jacobi R (#29, #31)
- Junior Johnson R (#73) – Did not finish rookie orientation
- Ed Kostenuk R (#37)
- Bill Krause R (#82)
- Ralph Liguori R (#3)
- Bob Mathouser R (#3)
- Keith Rachwitz R
- Chuck Rodee (#25, #38)
- Pedro Rodríguez R (#48)
- Paul Russo (#53)
- Colby Scroggin R (#73)
- Joe Sostilio R (#62)
- Gig Stephens R
- Curtis Turner R (#12)
- Jack Turner (#44) – Wrecked practice; retired
- Bob Wente R

== Race details ==
=== Start ===
Parnelli Jones started from the pole position, and at the start, led the field into turn one. A fierce duel broke out in the opening laps. Jim Hurtubise, who started in the middle of the front row, caught up to Jones down the backstretch, and passed him for the lead. Hurtubise led at the stripe at the completion of lap 1. On lap 2, Jones caught up to Hurtubise again, and took the lead back in turn four, and led lap 2. Hurtubise dove down to re-take the lead in turn one, but Jones was able to slip by and hold the position.

On lap 3, Bobby Unser swerved to avoid running into the car of Dick Rathmann. Unser spun out and crashed into the wall in turn one. The yellow light would stay on for nearly ten minutes to clean up a gasoline spill caused by the wreck. Jones continued to lead, and when the green flag came back out on lap 10, he pulled out to a sizable margin.

=== First half ===
With Jones ahead, Hurtubise was running second, holding off Roger McCluskey and Bobby Marshman in 3rd-4th. Hurtubise held off their challenge for many laps, his powerful Novi engine blasting down the long straights. By lap 40, however, McCluskey and Marshman finally got by Hurtubise. Jones was all alone though, ahead by over 20 seconds.

On lap 46, the yellow came out for a crash by Bud Tingelstad in turn two. At the same time, Allen Crowe lost a wheel and crashed in turn 1. Still under the caution light on lap 50, Jim McElreath and Bobby Marshman spun in the pit area. They avoided a major mishap and made no contact. They got to their pit stalls, and rejoined the race.

Leader Parnelli Jones made his first pit stop on lap 62. As the other leaders pitted one by one, Jim Clark and Dan Gurney (driving the Lotus 29-Ford rear-engined machines) worked their way to the front of the field. The venerable front engine roadsters were expected to make 2–3 pits stops each, while the rear-engined Lotus machines were planning on only one pit stop for fuel. Tire wear was a concern for the heavy roadsters, but the Lotus team was hoping to go the whole way without changing any tires. Clark passed Roger McCluskey for the lead on lap 68.

With Clark and Gurney running 1st-2nd, Parnelli Jones was running third. Despite having already pitted, Jones remarkably was only about 18 seconds behind. The superior handling the rear-engined machines enjoyed in the corners was still somewhat trumped by the higher top speed the front-engined roadsters achieved down the long straights.

It was around lap 80 that observers began to see oil smoke intermittently trailing Parnelli Jones' car. Jim Clark made his lone scheduled pit stop on lap 95, taking on fuel and changing three tires (the rarely-worn left-front was left in place). His stop was timed at 33 seconds. That gave the lead back to Jones, who now enjoyed a 37-second margin. Dan Gurney in the other Lotus, however, had a worn out right-rear tire, and his pit stop dragged on for 42 seconds. Gurney went a lap down and dropped to 9th place.

Jim Hurtubise, an early contender who started slipping in the standings due to handling issues, dropped out at the halfway point with an oil leak.

=== Second half ===
Jim McElreath spun in the pits, brushed the wall, and lost a wheel. He was able to get to his pit stall, and was able to rejoin the race.

Just after the 120-lap mark, Eddie Johnson spun about three-fourths the way down the backstretch, likely due to hitting an oil slick. He spun to the inside, and crashed into the inside wall. Under the yellow light on lap 125, Parnelli Jones made his second pit stop, taking advantage of the caution. After a 27-second pit stop, he came out of the pits still in the lead, and lost minimal ground.

With 50 laps to go, Parnelli Jones had a 43-second lead over second place Jim Clark, and A. J. Foyt was in third. All other cars were at least one lap down. Dan Gurney had worked his way back up to 4th, Roger McCluskey was running 5th, followed by Eddie Sachs, Rodger Ward, Jim McElreath, Don Branson, and Bobby Marshman filling out the top ten.

At around lap 160, Duane Carter blew an engine in turn one, bringing out the yellow light. Leader Parnelli Jones took advantage of the yellow once again, and ducked into the pits. He changed tires in 20 seconds, and was back out on the track. His once commanding lead, however, was down to only 10 seconds. The Lotus team of Jim Clark and Dan Gurney were now running 2nd and 4th, respectively, and the question remained if they would both be able to go the distance without another pit stop to change tires.

When the green came back out, Jim Clark began steadily closing the gap behind Parnelli Jones. With 25 laps to go, Jones' lead was down to only 5–6 seconds. Meanwhile, Dan Gurney was forced to the pits with a worn out right-rear tire. A couple laps later, he was back in the pits to change the right-front, and Gurney fell out of contention for the victory. He wound up 7th at the finish.

=== Finish ===
In the closing laps, Eddie Sachs spun on two occasions, once on lap 179, then again in turn three on about lap 189, the second time hitting the wall and losing a wheel. The second spin was the impetus of a controversy that embroiled over the next few minutes.

With about twenty laps to go, USAC officials were growing increasingly concerned with the sight of smoke venting from the leader's car. Parnelli Jones had been visibly leaking oil for some time due to a horizontal crack in the external oil tank at the rear of the car. Some observers were reporting the smoke was more intense, particularly in the turns, and that dripping oil was making the track slick, which led to Eddie Sach's crash in turn three. USAC chief steward Harlan Fengler was contemplating displaying the black flag to Jones, which would have sent him to the pits for consultation, and almost certainly deny him any chance at victory.

J. C. Agajanian, the owner of the Jones entry, immediately confronted Harlan Fengler and Henry Banks in a heated exchange at the start/finish line. Colin Chapman of the Lotus team also rushed over to join the discussion, arguing for Clark's case, and that Jones should be disqualified for leaking oil. Agajanian argued that the leak was minor, and had ceased once it dropped below the level of the crack. He also quipped that other cars on the track were leaking worse, without recourse. The confrontation went on for several minutes on the grass parapet by the starter's stand, and USAC ultimately decided not to black flag Jones.

The green light came back on for lap 193, and Jones quickly pulled out to a 21-second lead. After Clark had narrowed the gap significantly, Jones was again holding a commanding lead. Parnelli Jones stayed in front and led to the finish. With the white flag waving, third place Roger McCluskey was running right with Jones down the mainstretch. The two cars were dicing through some traffic, and McCluskey spun out and came to a rest in turn three, bringing out a last-lap yellow flag. Jones narrowly skirted by the incident on the outside unscathed, and cruised to victory. Jim Clark come home second, and A. J. Foyt finished third.

=== Post-race ===
The day after the race, Eddie Sachs and Parnelli Jones got into an argument, and exchanged fists over the oil leak controversy. Chief steward Harlan Fengler explained his decision not to black flag Jones, citing that the leak had subsided, and that so few laps were left, that he didn't want to "take this race away from a man on a snap judgement."

The Lotus team, while unhappy with the perceived favoritism offered to the American participants, ultimately declined to protest. They acknowledged Jones' clear superiority in the event. In addition, Ford officials recognized that a victory through disqualification of Clark's biggest competitor would not be well received by the American public.

== Box score ==
Finish	Start	No	Name	Chassis	Engine	Qual	Laps	Status
1	1	98	(United States) Parnelli Jones	Watson	Offenhauser	151.153	200	143.137 mph
2	5	92	(United Kingdom) Jim Clark R	Lotus	Ford	149.750	200	+33.84
3	8	2	(United States) A. J. Foyt W	Trevis	Offenhauser	150.615	200	+1:21.97
4	4	1	(United States) Rodger Ward W	Watson	Offenhauser	149.800	200	+3:02.45
5	3	4	(United States) Don Branson	Watson	Offenhauser	150.188	200	+3:22.74
6	6	8	(United States) Jim McElreath	Watson	Offenhauser	149.744	200	+3:23.10
7	12	93	(United States) Dan Gurney	Lotus	Ford	149.019	200	+4:35.26
8	11	10	(United States) Chuck Hulse	Ewing	Offenhauser	149.340	200	+4:35.90
9	31	84	(United States) Al Miller R	Thompson	Chevrolet	149.613	200	+5:25.64
10	17	22	(United States) Dick Rathmann	Watson	Offenhauser	149.130	200	+6:28.73
11	30	29	(United States) Dempsey Wilson	Watson	Offenhauser	147.832	200	+6:54.08
12	33	17	(United States) Troy Ruttman W	Kuzma	Offenhauser	148.374	200	+7:25.09
13	18	65	(United States) Bob Christie	Christensen	Offenhauser	149.123	200	+10:49.82
14	32	32	(United States) Ebb Rose	Watson	Offenhauser	148.545	200	+17:05.25
15	14	14	(United States) Roger McCluskey	Watson	Offenhauser	148.680	198	Spun T3
16	7	5	(United States) Bobby Marshman	Epperly	Offenhauser	149.458	196	Rear End
17	10	9	(United States) Eddie Sachs	Watson	Offenhauser	149.570	181	Crash T3
18	9	99	(United States) Paul Goldsmith	Watson	Offenhauser	150.163	149	Crankshaft
19	19	52	(United States) Lloyd Ruby	Watson	Offenhauser	149.123	126	Crash T4
20	21	88	(United States) Eddie Johnson	Watson	Offenhauser	148.509	112	Crash BS
21	22	45	(United States) Chuck Stevenson	Watson	Offenhauser	148.386	110	Valve
22	2	56	(United States) Jim Hurtubise	Kurtis Kraft	Novi	150.257	102	Oil Leak
23	15	83	(United States) Duane Carter	Thompson	Chevrolet	148.002	100	Rod
24	29	16	(United States) Jim Rathmann W	Watson	Offenhauser	147.838	99	Magneto
25	20	26	(United States) Bobby Grim	Trevis	Offenhauser	148.717	79	Oil Leak
26	24	86	(United States) Bob Veith	Epperly	Offenhauser	148.289	74	Valve
27	13	35	(United States) Allen Crowe	Trevis	Offenhauser	148.877	47	Crash T1
28	25	54	(United States) Bud Tingelstad	Epperly	Offenhauser	148.227	46	Crash T2
29	26	37	(United States) Johnny Rutherford R	Watson	Offenhauser	148.063	43	Transmission
30	28	21	(United States) Elmer George	Lesovsky	Offenhauser	147.893	21	Handling
31	23	75	(United States) Art Malone R	Kurtis Kraft	Novi	148.343	18	Clutch
32	27	23	(United States) Johnny Boyd	Salih	Offenhauser	148.038	12	Oil Leak
33	16	6	(United States) Bobby Unser R	Kurtis Kraft	Novi	149.421	2	Crash T1

W Former Indianapolis 500 winner

R Indianapolis 500 Rookie

All entrants utilized Firestone tires.

=== Race statistics ===
Lap Leaders
Laps	Leader
1	Jim Hurtubise
2–63	Parnelli Jones
64–67	Roger McCluskey
68–95	Jim Clark
96–200	Parnelli Jones

Total laps led
Driver	Laps
Parnelli Jones	167
Jim Clark	28
Roger McCluskey	4
Jim Hurtubise	1

Yellow Lights: 7 for 42 minutes, 14 seconds
Laps*	Reason
2–10	Bobby Unser crash in turn 1 (9 minutes, 41 seconds)
46–53	Tinglestad crash in turn 1 (9 minutes, 32 seconds); Crowe crash in turn 2
65	Duane Carter brushed wall in turn 2 (2 minutes, 5 seconds)
121–128	Eddie Johnson crash on backstretch (5 minutes); Lloyd Ruby spun in turn 4
160	Duane Carter smoking in turn 1
179	Eddie Sachs spun in turn 2 (1 minutes 1 second)
190–192	Eddie Sachs crash in turn 4 (6 minutes, 19 seconds)
200	Roger McCluskey spin in turn 2 (<1 minute)
* – Approximate lap counts

== Race notes ==
- NASCAR driver Junior Johnson practiced, but did not qualify. Curtis Turner passed a rookie test, but crashed in practice.
- The Lotus-Ford machines of Jim Clark and Dan Gurney are the last two cars ever to race in the Indy 500 utilizing carburetors (Weber). All other cars in the field, and all other cars since, have utilized fuel injection.

== Broadcasting ==
=== Radio ===
The race was carried live on the IMS Radio Network. Sid Collins served as chief announcer. Fred Agabashian served as "driver expert."

Lou Palmer, who had debuted in 1958, moved from turn three to the pit area, replacing John Peterson, where he would remain for 25 years. Palmer also took over the duty of the winner's interview in victory lane. Mike Ahern returned to the broadcast after a year absence, and took over the turn three location. This was the last year with Charlie Brockman as Statistician, and also the last year with Bernie Herman on the Backstretch.

The radio affiliate count topped 700 stations worldwide.

Indianapolis Motor Speedway Radio Network
Booth Announcers	Turn Reporters	Pit/garage reporters
Chief Announcer: Sid Collins; Driver expert: Fred Agabashian; Statistician: Charlie Brockman	Turn 1: Bill Frosh; Turn 2: Howdy Bell; Backstretch: Bernie Herman; Turn 3: Mike Ahern; Turn 4: Jim Shelton	Jack Shapiro (north); Luke Walton (center); Lou Palmer (south)

=== Television ===
For the third year, a few minutes of race highlights were telecast on ABC's "Wide World Of Sports".

== Gallery ==
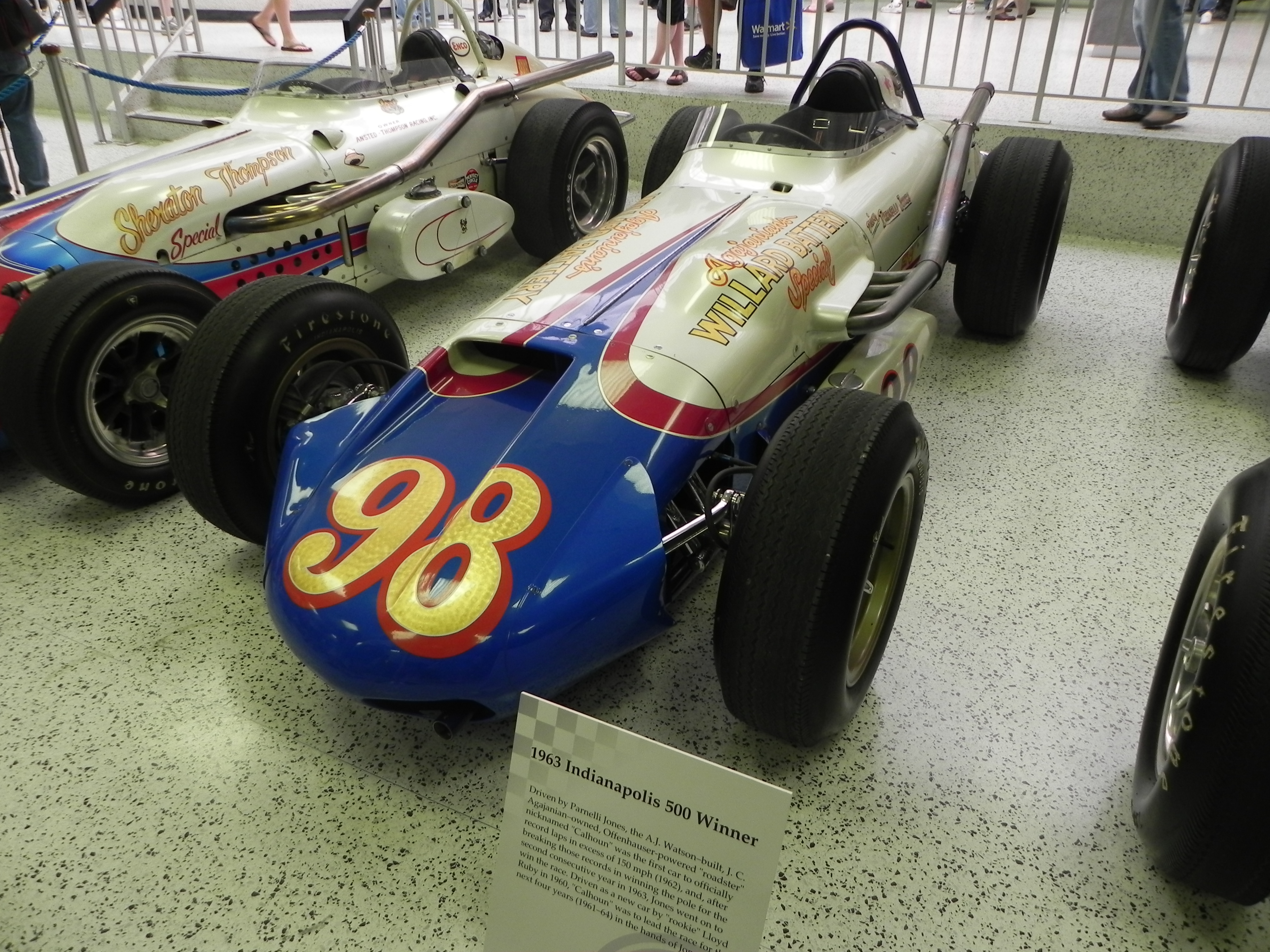
1963 winning car

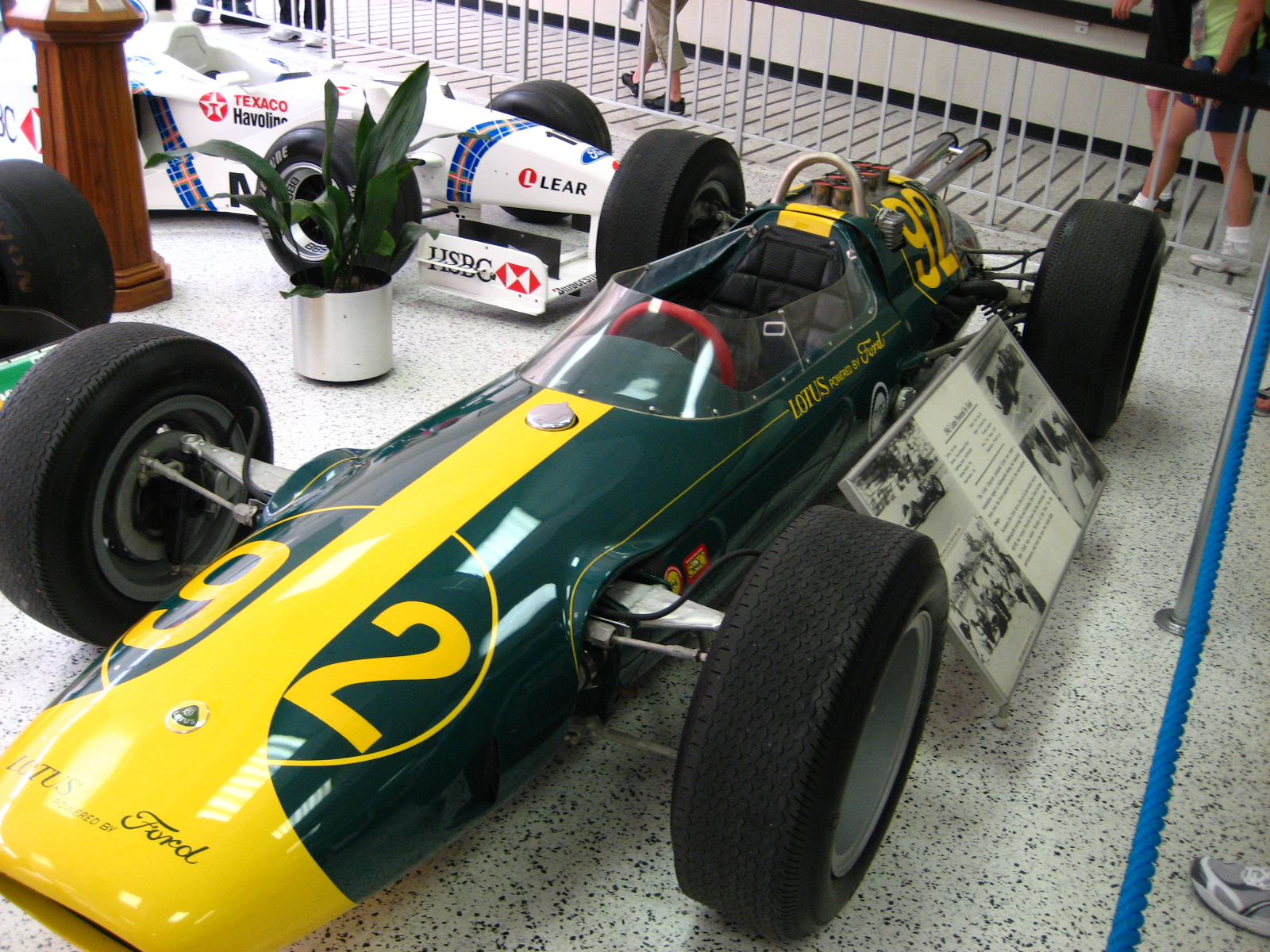
Jim Clark's 1963 Lotus 29

== Notes ==
=== Works cited ===
- Indianapolis 500 History: Race & All-Time Stats - Official Site

1962 Indianapolis 500; Rodger Ward	1963 Indianapolis 500; Parnelli Jones	1964 Indianapolis 500; A. J. Foyt
Preceded by 140.293 mph (1962 Indianapolis 500)	Record for the fastest average speed 143.137 mph	Succeeded by 147.350 mph (1964 Indianapolis 500)
