= 1962 Indianapolis 500 =

American motor race

46th Indianapolis 500
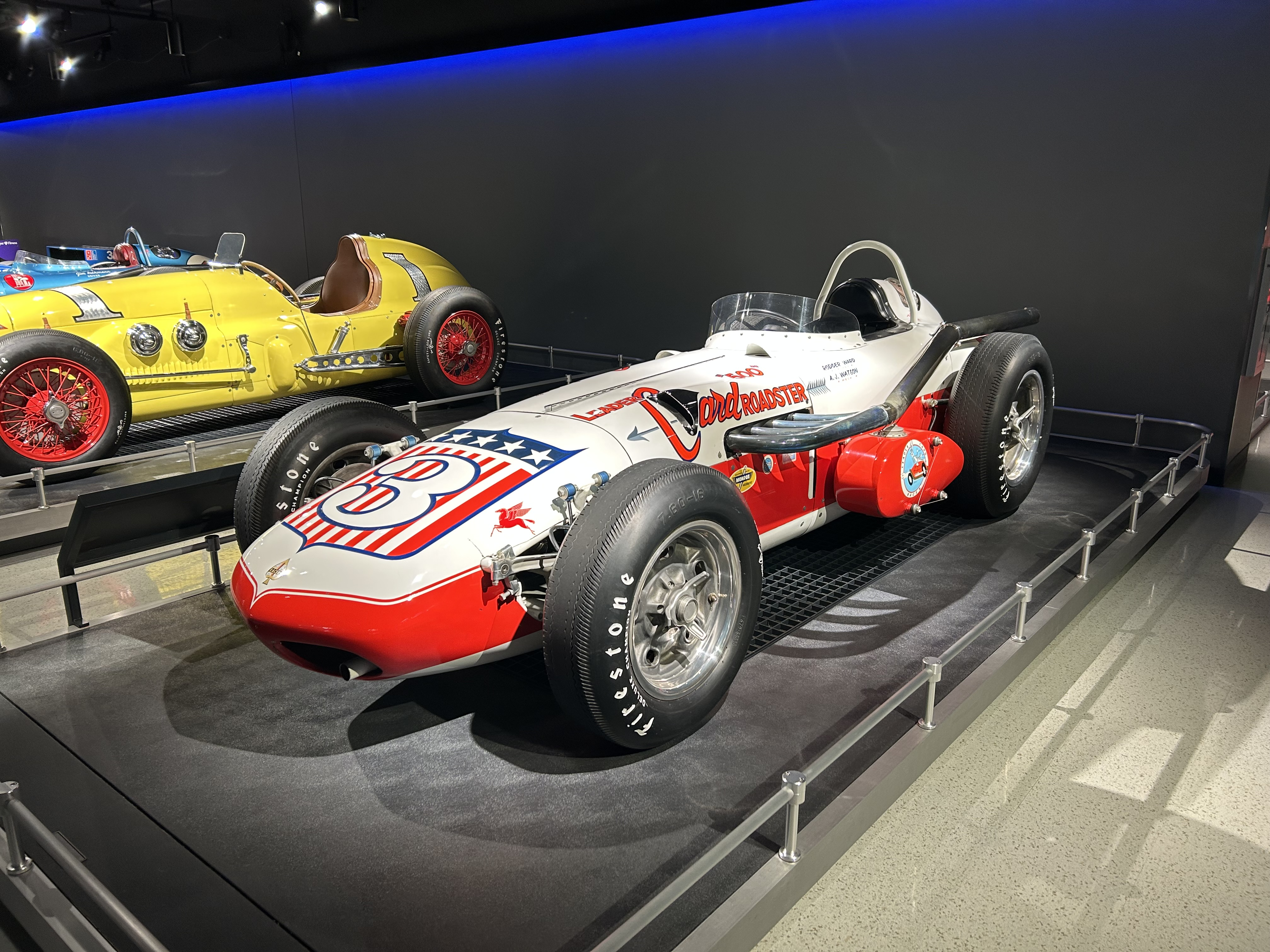

Indianapolis Motor Speedway

Indianapolis 500
- Sanctioning body: USAC
- Season: 1962 USAC season
- Date: May 30, 1962
- Winner: Rodger Ward
- Winning team: Leader Card Racers
- Winning Chief Mechanic: A. J. Watson
- Time of race: 3:33:50.33
- Average speed: 140.293 mph (225.780 km/h)
- Pole position: Parnelli Jones
- Pole speed: 150.370 mph (241.997 km/h)
- Fastest qualifier: Parnelli Jones
- Rookie of the Year: Jim McElreath
- Most laps led: Parnelli Jones (120)

Pre-race ceremonies
- National anthem: Purdue Band
- "Back Home Again in Indiana": C. David Cochard
- Starting command: Tony Hulman
- Pace car: Studebaker Lark Daytona Convertible
- Pace car driver: Sam Hanks
- Starter: Pat Vidan
- Honorary referee: Robert A. Stranahan, Jr.
- Estimated attendance: 230,000

Chronology
Previous	Next
1961	1963

The 46th International 500-Mile Sweepstakes was held at the Indianapolis Motor Speedway in Speedway, Indiana on Wednesday, May 30, 1962.

A historic pole day saw Parnelli Jones break the 150 mph (240 km/h) barrier in qualifying. Rodger Ward and Len Sutton finished 1st-2nd for Leader Card Racers.

The 1962 Indy 500 marked the final 500 wherein the entire 33-car field consisted of U.S.-born participants. It was also the first race held with the track surface paved entirely in asphalt, with just the ceremonial single yard of bricks exposed at the start/finish line.

== Race schedule ==
For 1962, the Opening Day of practice was shifted back to Saturday April 28. Time trials were held on the second and third weekends of May, allowing the 500 Festival Open Invitation golf tournament the entire fourth weekend of May. Bump Day was held May 20, ten days prior to the race. Carburetion Day, the final day of practice was held Monday May 28, along with the 500 Festival Parade later that evening.

Race schedule — April/May 1962
Sun	Mon	Tue	Wed	Thu	Fri	Sat
22	23	24	25	26	27	28; Practice
29; Practice	30; Practice	1 Practice	2 Practice	3 Practice	4 Practice	5 Practice
6 Practice	7 Practice	8 Practice	9 Practice	10; Practice	11; Practice	12; Pole Day
13; Time Trials	14; Practice	15; Practice	16; Practice	17; Practice	18; Practice	19; Time Trials
20; Bump Day	21	22	23; Pro-Am	24; 500 Open	25; 500 Open	26; 500 Open
27; 500 Open	28; Carb Day	29; Meeting	30; Indy 500	31; Banquet		

Color	Notes
Green	Practice
Dark Blue	Time trials
Silver	Race day
Blank	No track activity

== Time trials ==
Time trials were scheduled for four days.

- Saturday May 12 – Pole Day time trials
  - Len Sutton was the first driver to make an assault on the track record. His fourth lap of 149.900 mph was a new one-lap track record.
  - Parnelli Jones became the first driver to break the 150 mph barrier. His first lap was run at 150.729 mph, a new all-time one-lap track record. All four of his laps were over 150 mph, and his four-lap average came in at 150.370 mph. Jones was rewarded by having 150 silver dollars poured into his helmet by Phil Hedback of Bryant Heating & Cooling.
- Sunday May 13 – Second day time trials
  - The 13th proved to be an unlucky day for Norm Hall, whose previous crash in car #25 left him unscathed, but today, he spun the #41 Forbes Special on the Southwest Turn, hit the wall backward, and was severely injured, including a fractured left leg and possible skull fracture. Jim Rathmann and Troy Ruttman were both flagged off by their crews after they failed to get sufficient speed to qualify. Eddie Sachs could not reach an acceptable speed and a new engine was ordered for his Dean-Autolite Special machine. Dan Gurney left for Holland to compete in the Dutch Grand Prix. Qualifiers this day were Eddie Johnson #32 at 146.592 and Bob Veith #96 at 146.157.
- Saturday May 19 – Third day time trials
- Sunday May 20 – Fourth day time trials

== Starting grid ==
Row	Inside		Middle		Outside	
1	98	(United States) Parnelli Jones	3	(United States) Rodger Ward W	54	(United States) Bobby Marshman
2	7	(United States) Len Sutton	1	(United States) A. J. Foyt W	4	(United States) Shorty Templeman
3	15	(United States) Jim McElreath R	34	(United States) Dan Gurney R	17	(United States) Roger McCluskey
4	5	(United States) Bud Tingelstad	14	(United States) Don Branson	27	(United States) Don Davis
5	9	(United States) Dick Rathmann	62	(United States) Paul Russo	18	(United States) Bobby Grim
6	19	(United States) Chuck Hulse R	21	(United States) Elmer George	32	(United States) Eddie Johnson
7	96	(United States) Bob Veith	88	(United States) Gene Hartley	67	(United States) Chuck Rodee R
8	83	(United States) Allen Crowe R	44	(United States) Jim Rathmann W	12	(United States) Lloyd Ruby
9	45	(United States) Jack Turner	53	(United States) Paul Goldsmith	2	(United States) Eddie Sachs
10	38	(United States) Johnny Boyd	91	(United States) Jim Hurtubise	26	(United States) Troy Ruttman W
11	29	(United States) Bob Christie	86	(United States) Ebb Rose	79	(United States) Jimmy Daywalt

R Indianapolis 500 rookie
W Indianapolis 500 winner

=== Alternates ===
- First alternate: Dempsey Wilson (#31)
- Second alternate: Ronnie Duman R (#28)

=== Failed to qualify ===
- Chuck Arnold (#23, #37, #46, #47, #77)
- Duane Carter (#72)
- Bill Cheesbourg (#35, #59, #88)
- Leon Clum R (#6, #23)
- Jack Conely R (#89)
- Russ Congdon R
- Tommy Copp R (#58)
- Johnny Coy R (#68, #92)
- Chuck Daigh R (#35)
- Jack Ensley R (#95)
- Jack Fairman R (#32, #78)
- Don Freeland (#36)
- Roy Graham R (#55)
- Norm Hall (#25, #41)
- Jim Hemmings R (#65, #94)
- Herb Hill R (#69) – Entry declined
- Bruce Jacobi R (#22)
- Ed Kostenuk R (#37)
- Ralph Ligouri R (#68)
- Bob Mathouser R (#43)
- Mike McGreevey R (#46)
- Al Miller R (#64)
- Keith Rachwitz R (#33)
- Gig Stephens R (#61)
- Chuck Stevenson (#16)
- Chuck Weyant

== Race recap ==
=== First half ===
Parnelli Jones took the lead at the start, and led the first 59 laps. The first incident on the track occurred on lap 17. A four-car crash in turn four involved Jack Turner, Bob Christie, Allen Crowe, and Chuck Rodee. A lengthy yellow light period was needed to clean up the incident.

=== Second half ===
Rodger Ward led the final 31 laps en route to victory. It was his second 500 win, after winning also in 1959. His Leader Cards teammate Len Sutton finished second, accomplishing the first team "sweep" of 1st-2nd since the Blue Crown team did it in 1947 and 1948.

After dominating much of the early race, Parnelli Jones, who started on the pole and led 120 laps, finished 7th. Jones chances for victory faded around the lap 125 mark when he lost his brakes. Unable to easily bring his car to a halt during pit stops, his crew put out tires so he could bump up against them or ride over them in order to help stop the car.

== Box score ==
Finish	Start	No	Name	Chassis	Engine	Qual	Laps	Status
1	2	3	(United States) Rodger Ward W	Watson	Offenhauser	149.371	200	140.293 mph
2	4	7	(United States) Len Sutton	Watson	Offenhauser	149.328	200	+11.52
3	27	2	(United States) Eddie Sachs	Ewing	Offenhauser	146.431	200	+19.93
4	12	27	(United States) Don Davis	Lesovsky	Offenhauser	147.209	200	+48.13
5	3	54	(United States) Bobby Marshman	Epperly	Offenhauser	149.347	200	+2:18.94
6	7	15	(United States) Jim McElreath R	Kurtis Kraft	Offenhauser	149.025	200	+2:31.69
7	1	98	(United States) Parnelli Jones	Watson	Offenhauser	150.370	200	+2:42.85
8	24	12	(United States) Lloyd Ruby	Watson	Offenhauser	146.520	200	+3:16.00
9	23	44	(United States) Jim Rathmann W	Watson	Offenhauser	146.610	200	+5:16.72
10	28	38	(United States) Johnny Boyd	Salih	Offenhauser	147.047	200	+5:46.86
11	6	4	(United States) Shorty Templeman	Watson	Offenhauser	149.050	200	+7:00.13
12	11	14	(United States) Don Branson	Epperly	Offenhauser	147.312	200	+7:00.90
13	29	91	(United States) Jim Hurtubise	Watson	Offenhauser	146.963	200	+7:18.61
14	32	86	(United States) Ebb Rose	Porter	Offenhauser	146.336	200	+10:02.37
15	10	5	(United States) Bud Tingelstad	Phillips	Offenhauser	147.753	200	+11:14.70
16	9	17	(United States) Roger McCluskey	Watson	Offenhauser	147.759	168	Spun T2
17	17	21	(United States) Elmer George (Paul Russo Laps 53–126) (A. J. Foyt Laps 127–147)	Lesovsky	Offenhauser	146.092	147	Engine
18	30	26	(United States) Troy Ruttman W	Kuzma	Offenhauser	146.765	140	Piston
19	15	18	(United States) Bobby Grim	Trevis	Offenhauser	146.604	96	Oil Leak
20	8	34	(United States) Dan Gurney R	Thompson	Buick	147.886	92	Rear End
21	16	19	(United States) Chuck Hulse R	Kurtis Kraft	Offenhauser	146.377	91	Fuel Pump
22	33	79	(United States) Jimmy Daywalt	Kurtis Kraft	Offenhauser	146.318	74	Transmission
23	5	1	(United States) A. J. Foyt W	Trevis	Offenhauser	149.074	69	Lost wheel
24	13	9	(United States) Dick Rathmann	Watson	Offenhauser	147.161	51	Magneto
25	18	32	(United States) Eddie Johnson	Trevis	Offenhauser	146.592	38	Magneto
26	26	53	(United States) Paul Goldsmith	Epperly	Offenhauser	146.437	26	Magneto
27	20	88	(United States) Gene Hartley (Bill Cheesbourg Laps 21–23)	Watson	Offenhauser	146.969	23	Steering
28	14	62	(United States) Paul Russo	Watson	Offenhauser	146.687	20	Piston
29	25	45	(United States) Jack Turner	Kurtis Kraft	Offenhauser	146.496	17	Crash FS
30	31	29	(United States) Bob Christie	Kurtis Kraft	Offenhauser	146.341	17	Crash FS
31	22	83	(United States) Allen Crowe R	Watson	Offenhauser	146.831	17	Crash FS
32	21	67	(United States) Chuck Rodee R	Christensen	Offenhauser	146.969	17	Crash FS
33	19	96	(United States) Bob Veith	Elder	Offenhauser	146.157	12	Engine

Note: Relief drivers in parentheses

W Former Indianapolis 500 winner

R Indianapolis 500 Rookie

All entrants utilized Firestone tires.

=== Race statistics ===
Lap Leaders
Laps	Leader
1–59	Parnelli Jones
60–61	A. J. Foyt
62–64	Roger McCluskey
65–125	Parnelli Jones
126–160	Rodger Ward
161–169	Len Sutton
170–200	Rodger Ward

Total laps led
Driver	Laps
Parnelli Jones	120
Rodger Ward	66
Len Sutton	9
Roger McCluskey	3
A. J. Foyt	2

Yellow Lights: 5 for 38 minutes, 18 seconds
Laps*	Reason
18–33	Turner, Christie, Crowe, Rodee crash in turn 4 (18:44)
37–38	Shorty Templeman spin fronstretch (2:09)
60–62	Bobby Grim (1:39)
75–81	A. J. Foyt lost wheel (6:50)
168	Roger McCluskey spin turn 2 (9:27)
* – Approximate lap counts

== Broadcasting ==
=== Radio ===
The race was carried live on the IMS Radio Network. Sid Collins served as chief announcer. Fred Agabashian served as "driver expert." Newcomer Howdy Bell joined the crew, serving as a turn reporter. It was his first of over 40 years with the network. Turn reporter Mike Ahern, who debuted on the radio crew a year earlier, missed the 1962 race due to being in the Army. He would return in 1963.

Indianapolis Motor Speedway Radio Network
Booth Announcers	Turn Reporters	Pit/garage reporters
Chief Announcer: Sid Collins; Driver expert: Fred Agabashian; Statistician: Charlie Brockman	Turn 1: Bill Frosh; Turn 2: Howdy Bell R Backstretch: Bernie Herman; Turn 3: Lou Palmer; Turn 4: Jim Shelton	Jack Shapiro (north); Luke Walton (center); John Peterson (south)

=== Television ===
Highlights of the time trials were shown on ABC's "Wide World Of Sports".

== Gallery ==
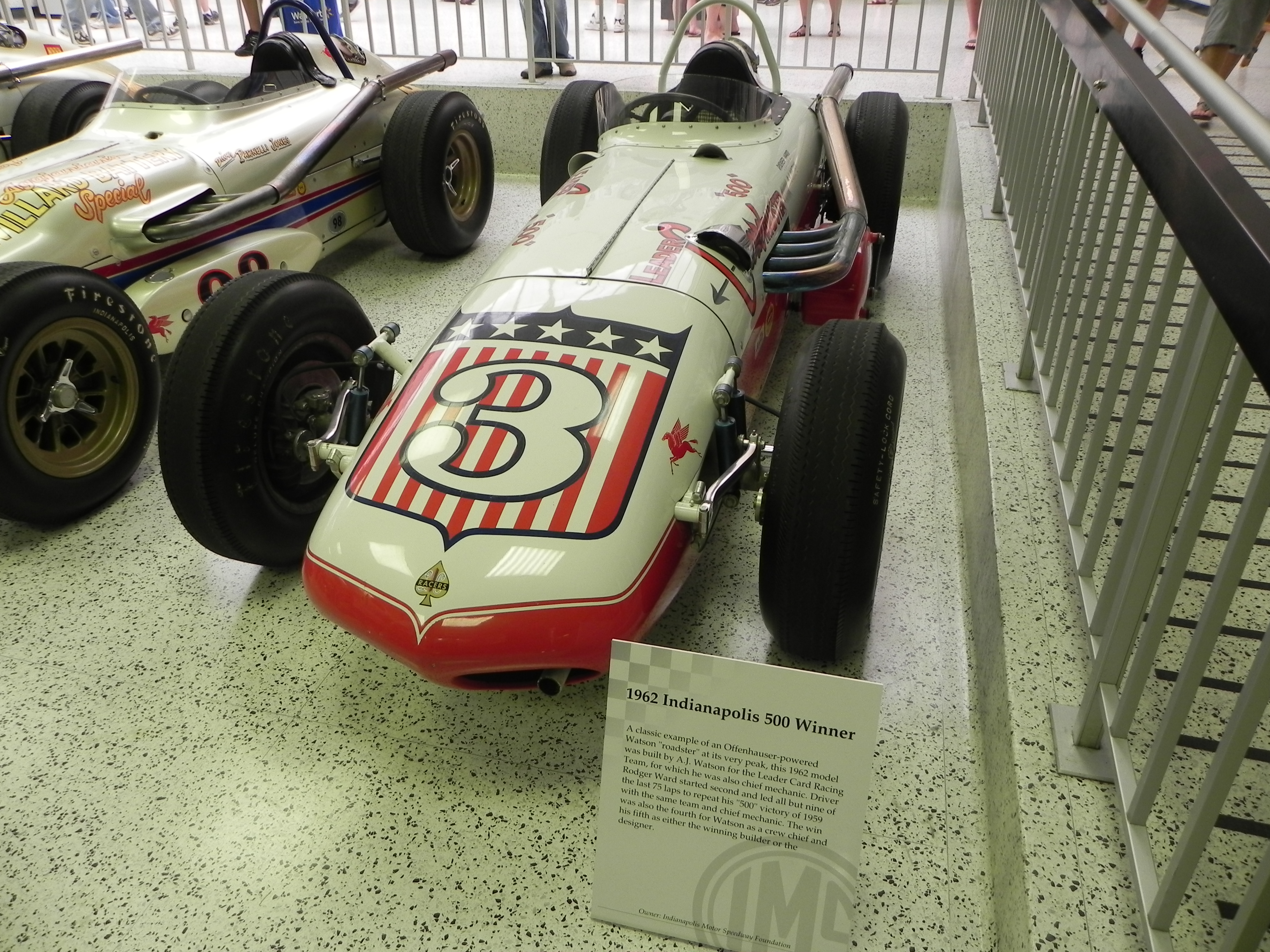
1962 winning car (Ward)

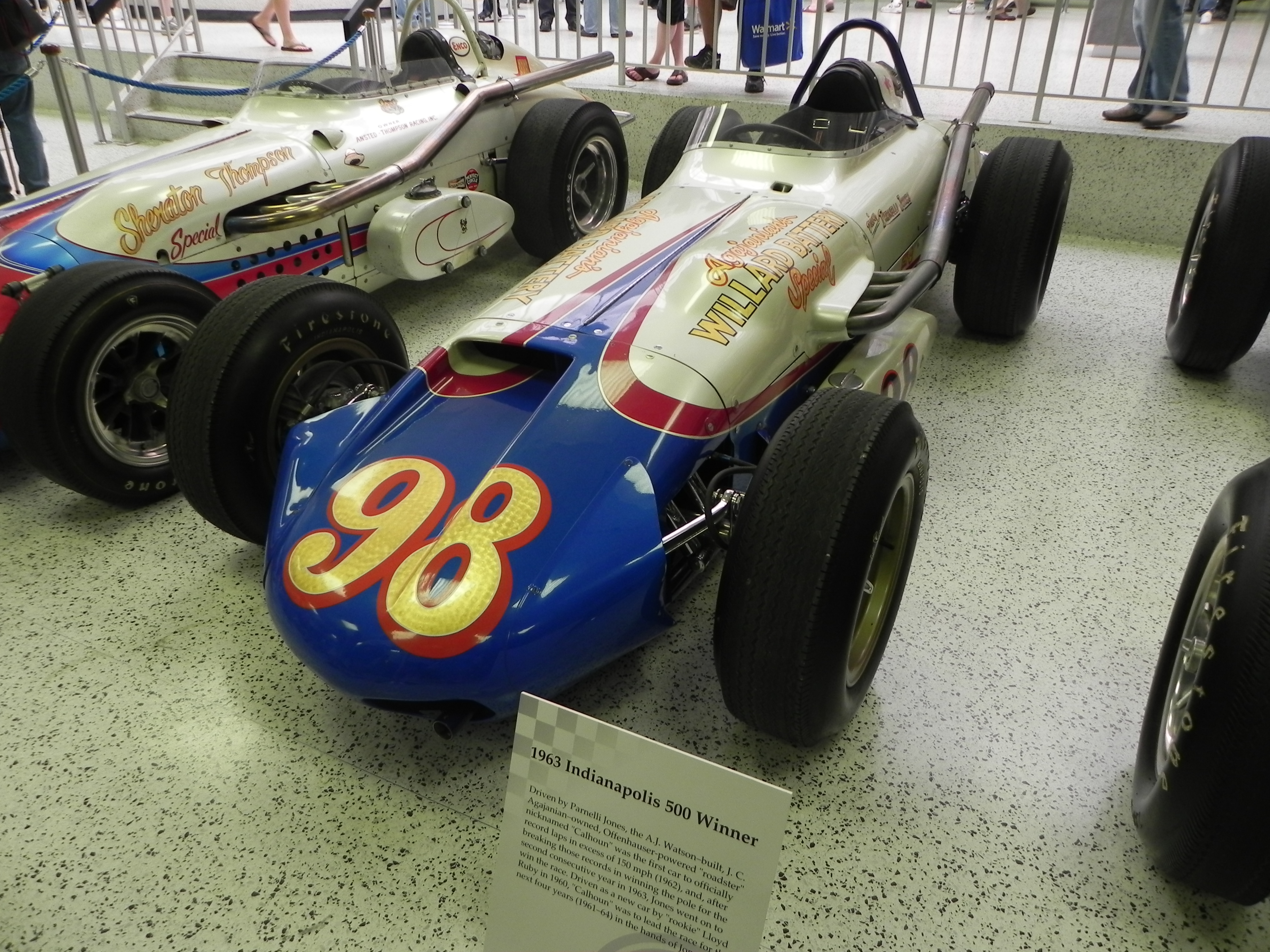
1962 pole position winning car (Jones)

== Notes ==
=== Works cited ===
- Indianapolis 500 History: Race & All-Time Stats - Official Site
- 1962 Indianapolis 500 at RacingReference.info (Relief driver statistics)
- 1962 Indianapolis 500 Radio Broadcast, Indianapolis Motor Speedway Radio Network

1961 Indianapolis 500; A. J. Foyt	1962 Indianapolis 500; Rodger Ward	1963 Indianapolis 500; Parnelli Jones
Preceded by 139.130 mph (1961 Indianapolis 500)	Record for the fastest average speed 140.293 mph	Succeeded by 143.137 mph (1963 Indianapolis 500)
