= Troy Ruttman =

American racing driver (1930–1997)

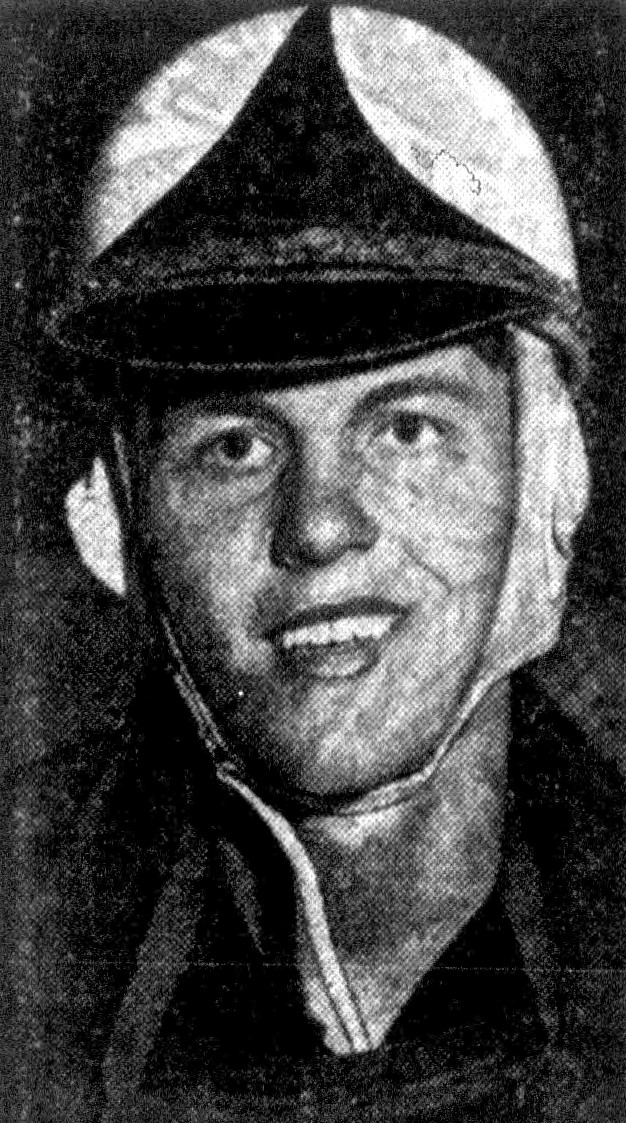
- Ruttman, circa 1951
- Born: Troy Lynn Ruttman; March 11, 1930 Mooreland, Oklahoma, U.S.
- Died: May 19, 1997 (aged 67) Lake Havasu City, Arizona, U.S.

Championship titles
- AAA Midwest Big Car (1951); Major victories Indianapolis 500 (1952)

Champ Car career
- 49 races run over 15 years
- Best finish: 2nd (1952)
- First race: 1949 Arlington 100 (Arlington)
- Last race: 1964 Trenton 150 (Trenton)
- First win: 1952 Indianapolis 500 (Indianapolis)
- Last win: 1952 Raleigh 200 (Raleigh)
Wins	Podiums	Poles
2	6	2

NASCAR Cup Series career
- 7 races run over 3 years
- Best finish: 49th (1962)
- First race: 1962 Atlanta 500 (Atlanta)
- Last race: 1964 Motor Trend 500 (Riverside)
Wins	Top tens	Poles
0	5	0

Formula One World Championship career
- Nationality: (United States) American
- Active years: 1950 – 1958, 1960
- Team(s): Lesovsky, Kurtis Kraft, Kuzma, Watson, Maserati
- Entries: 12 (8 starts)
- Championships: 0
- Wins: 1
- Podiums: 1
- Career points: 9.5
- Pole positions: 0
- Fastest laps: 0
- First entry: 1950 Indianapolis 500
- First win: 1952 Indianapolis 500
- Last entry: 1960 Indianapolis 500

Troy Lynn Ruttman (March 11, 1930 – May 19, 1997) was an American racing driver. He is best known for winning the 1952 Indianapolis 500 - at the age of 22 years and 80 days, Ruttman remains the youngest ever winner of the event. Competing since the age of 15, he had a remarkably successful early career, winning several regional and AAA-sanctioned championships.

Troy's younger brother Joe Ruttman also became a racing driver.

== Driving career ==
=== Early career ===
In 1945, at age 15, Ruttman entered his family's car into a roadster race held in San Bernardino, California, winning the event. He won 19 of the 21 events staged there that season. By 1947, he was the California Roadster Association (CRA) roadster champion. He also won his first five midget car races that season. In 1948 he repeated as the CRA roadster champion, United Racing Association Blue Circuit (Offy) championship, and 23 midget car events.

=== Sprint car career ===
In May 1949, Ruttman left California for the AAA Sprint and Championship car circuits of the Midwest. He won three AAA Sprint Car championships over the next three and a half seasons. He competed in 51 midget races, winning 16 and placing in the top-three 28 times.

=== Championship car career ===
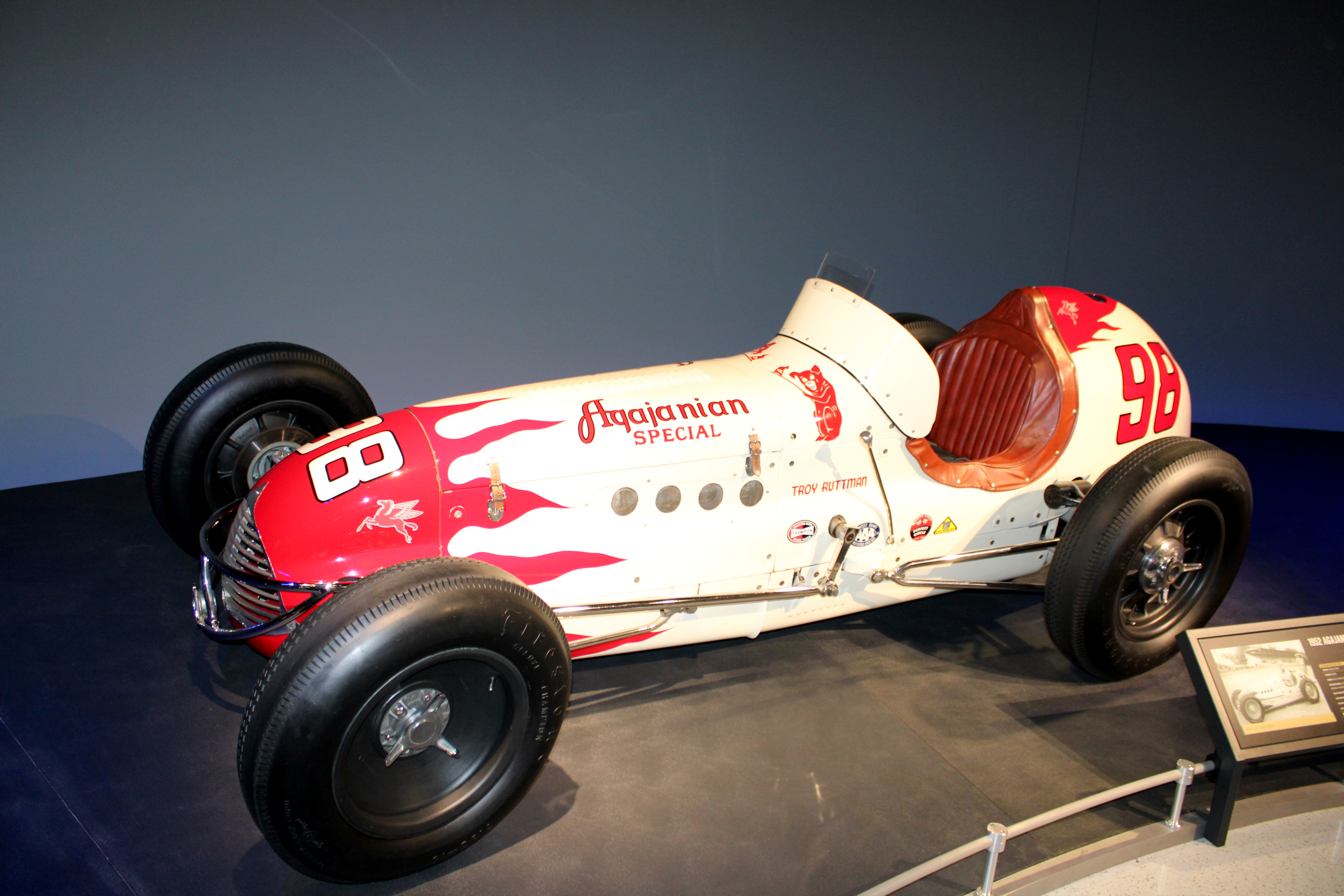
Ruttman's winning car from the 1952 Indianapolis 500

Ruttman drove in the AAA and USAC Championship Car series, racing in the 1949–1952, 1954, 1956–1957 and 1960–1964 seasons with 58 starts, including the Indianapolis 500 races during 1949–1952, 1954, 1956–1957, and 1960–1964. His best championship finish was as runner-up to Chuck Stevenson for the 1952 National Championship.

Ruttman's victory in the 1952 Indianapolis 500 made him the youngest winner of the event.

An injury during a sprint car crash in August 1952 sidelined Ruttman for one and a half racing seasons. Ruttman returned in 1954 on a greatly reduced schedule, never attaining the same level of success. He had not been diligent during his recovery, gaining weight, and spending time partying - a competitor remarked that Ruttman was a case of "too much, too young."

=== Stock car career ===
Ruttman won the 1956 USAC Stock Car Short Track Division title. Ruttman also competed in seven races in the NASCAR Grand National Series from 1962 to 1964, finishing in the top-ten five times. His best finish was third in the 1963 race at Riverside International Raceway, running behind Dan Gurney and A. J. Foyt.

=== World Drivers' Championship career ===
The AAA/USAC-sanctioned Indianapolis 500 was included in the FIA World Drivers' Championship from 1950 through 1960. Drivers competing at Indianapolis during those years were credited with World Drivers' Championship points and participation in addition to those which they received towards the AAA/USAC National Championship.

Ruttman participated in seven World Drivers' Championship races at Indianapolis. He was also the first of a small number of USAC/Indianapolis drivers to start an FIA-sanctioned World Drivers' Championship event during the 1950-1960 period - competing for Scuderia Centro Sud in the 1958 French Grand Prix. During his World Drivers' Championship career, Ruttman won once, and he accumulated 9.5 World Drivers' Championship points.

Ruttman's victory in the 1952 Indianapolis 500 earned him the distinction of being the youngest driver to win a round of the World Drivers' Championship, an honor he held until Fernando Alonso won the 2003 Hungarian Grand Prix.

== Retirement and death ==
After concluding his racing career at the age of 34, Ruttman relocated to Plymouth, Michigan, operating a motorcycle and snowmobile dealership.

Ruttman died as a result of lung cancer on May 19, 1997, at Lake Havasu City, Arizona, just a month before the long planned "Troy Ruttman Day" in his hometown of Mooreland, Oklahoma.

== Awards and honors ==
Ruttman has been inducted into the following halls of fame:

- Michigan Motor Sports Hall of Fame (1982)
- Auto Racing Hall of Fame (1992)
- National Sprint Car Hall of Fame (1993)
- West Coast Stock Car/Motorsports Hall of Fame (2002)
- National Midget Auto Racing Hall of Fame (2003)
- Motorsports Hall of Fame of America (2005)
- United States Auto Club (USAC) Hall of Fame (2018)

== Motorsports career results ==
=== AAA/USAC Championship Car results ===
Year	1	2	3	4	5	6	7	8	9	10	11	12	13	14	15	Pos	Points
1949	ARL; 8	INDY; 12	MIL; 18	TRE	SPR	MIL	DUQ	PIK	NYS	DET	SPR	LAN	SAC; 3	DMR; 12		21st	250
1950	INDY; 15	MIL; 17	LAN; 10	SPR; DNQ	MIL; 13	PIK	SYR; 14	DET; 11	SPR	SAC; 12	PHX; 17	BAY; 15	DAR; 18			41st	46
1951	INDY; 23	MIL	LAN	DAR	SPR; 6	MIL	DUQ	DUQ	PIK	SYR	DET	DNC	SJS; 15	PHX	BAY	39th	80
1952	INDY; 1	MIL; DNQ	RAL; 1	SPR; 12	MIL	DET	DUQ	PIK	SYR	DNC	SJS	PHX				2nd	1,410
1953	INDY; Wth	MIL	SPR	DET	SPR	MIL	DUQ	PIK	SYR	ISF	SAC	PHX				-	0
1954	INDY; 4	MIL; 7	LAN	DAR; 15	SPR	MIL	DUQ	PIK	SYR	ISF	SAC	PHX	LVG			15th	447
1955	INDY; DNQ	MIL	LAN	SPR	MIL	DUQ	PIK	SYR	ISF	SAC	PHX					-	0
1956	INDY; 31	MIL; 20	LAN	DAR; DNS	ATL	SPR	MIL	DUQ	SYR	ISF	SAC	PHX				-	0
1957	INDY; 31	LAN	MIL; 10	DET	ATL	SPR	MIL; 25	DUQ	SYR	ISF	TRE	SAC	PHX			36th	30
1958	TRE	INDY; DNQ	MIL	LAN	ATL	SPR	MIL	DUQ	SYR	ISF	TRE	SAC; 14	PHX; DNP			-	0
1960	TRE	INDY; 20	MIL; DNQ	LAN	SPR	MIL	DUQ	SYR	ISF	TRE	SAC	PHX				-	0
1961	TRE; 3	INDY; 20	MIL; 16	LAN	MIL	SPR	DUQ	SYR	ISF	TRE	SAC	PHX				23rd	140
1962	TRE	INDY; 18	MIL; DNQ	LAN	TRE	SPR	MIL; 13	LAN	SYR; 3	ISF; DNQ	TRE; 13	SAC; 6	PHX; 7			15th	280
1963	TRE; 5	INDY; 12	MIL; DNQ	LAN	TRE; 5	SPR	MIL; 14	DUQ	ISF	TRE; 3	SAC	PHX				11th	580
1964	PHX	TRE	INDY; 18	MIL; 4	LAN	TRE; 8	SPR	MIL; Wth	DUQ	ISF	TRE	SAC	PHX			26th	160

=== Indianapolis 500 results ===
Year	Car	Start	Qual	Rank	Finish	Laps	Led	Retired
1949	64	18	125.945	32	12	151	0	Flagged
1950	55	24	131.912	9	15	130	0	Flagged
1951	98	6	132.314	25	23	78	0	Bearing
1952	98	7	135.364	18	1st	200	44	Running
1954	34	11	137.736	31	4	200	0	Running
1956	53	11	142.484	17	31	22	0	Spun FS
1957	52	3	142.772	7	31	13	4	Overheating
1960	28	6	145.366	8	20	134	11	Rear End Gear
1961	52	22	144.799	23	20	105	10	Clutch
1962	26	30	146.765	19	18	140	0	Piston
1963	17	33	148.374	24	12	200	0	Running
1964	14	18	151.292	24	18	99	0	Spun T3
Totals						1472	69	

Starts	12
Poles	0
Front Row	1
Wins	1
Top 5	2
Top 10	2
Retired	7

=== FIA World Drivers' Championship results ===
(key)

Year	Entrant	Chassis	Engine	1	2	3	4	5	6	7	8	9	10	11	WDC	Points
1950	Bowes Racing Inc.	Lesovsky	Offenhauser Straight-4	GBR	MON	500; 15	SUI	BEL	FRA	ITA					NC	0
1951	Christopher J.C. Agajanian	Kurtis Kraft 2000	Offenhauser Straight-4	SUI	500; Ret	BEL	FRA	GBR	GER	ITA	ESP				NC	0
1952	Christopher J.C. Agajanian	Kuzma	Offenhauser Straight-4	SUI	500; 1	BEL	FRA	GBR	GER	NED	ITA				7th	8
1953	Travelon Trailer	Kurtis Kraft 500B	Offenhauser Straight-4	ARG	500; DNQ	NED	BEL	FRA	GBR	GER	SUI	ITA			NC	0
1954	Eugene A Casaroll	Kurtis Kraft 500A	Offenhauser Straight-4	ARG	500; 4^{†}	BEL	FRA	GBR	GER	SUI	ITA	ESP			23rd=	1.5
1955	Novi Racing	Kurtis Kraft	Novi Straight-8s	ARG	MON	500; DNQ	BEL	NED	GBR	ITA					NC	0
1956	John Zink	Kurtis Kraft 500C	Offenhauser Straight-4	ARG	MON	500; Ret	BEL	FRA	GBR	GER	ITA				NC	0
1957	John Zink	Watson	Offenhauser Straight-4	ARG	MON	500; Ret	FRA	GBR	GER	PES	ITA				NC	0
1958	Christopher J.C. Agajanian	Kuzma	Offenhauser Straight-4	ARG	MON	NED	500; DNQ	BEL							NC	0
1958	Scuderia Centro Sud	Maserati 250F	Maserati Straight-6						FRA; 10	GBR	GER; DNS	POR	ITA	MOR	NC	0
1960	John Zink	Watson	Offenhauser Straight-4	ARG	MON	500; Ret	NED	BEL	FRA	GBR	POR	ITA	USA		NC	0

- † = Shared drive

Awards
Preceded by Lee Wallard	Indianapolis 500 Winner; 1952	Succeeded by Bill Vukovich
Records
Preceded by José Froilán González; 27 years, 228 days (1950 Monaco GP)	Youngest driver to start a Formula One race 20 years, 80 days (1950 Indianapolis 500)	Succeeded by Ricardo Rodríguez; 19 years, 208 days (1961 Italian GP)
Preceded by José Froilán González; 28 years, 282 days (1951 British GP)	Youngest Grand Prix race winner 22 years, 80 days (1952 Indianapolis 500)	Succeeded by Fernando Alonso; 22 years, 26 days (2003 Hungarian GP)
Preceded by José Froilán González; 28 years, 269 days (1951 French GP)	Youngest driver to score a podium position in Formula One; 22 years, 80 days (1952 Indianapolis 500)	Succeeded by Bruce McLaren; 21 years, 322 days (1959 British GP)
Preceded by Bobby Ball; 25 years, 276 days (1951 Indianapolis 500)	Youngest driver to score points in Formula One; 22 years, 80 days (1952 Indianapolis 500)	Succeeded by Bruce McLaren; 21 years, 253 days (1959 Monaco GP)
