= Paul Goldsmith =

Paul Goldsmith may refer to:

- Paul Goldsmith (racing driver)
- Paul Goldsmith (politician)

== See also ==
- Paul Goldschmidt
