= Bob Christie (racing driver) =

American racing driver (1924–2009)

- Born: April 4, 1924
- Died: June 1, 2009 (aged 85); Grants Pass, Oregon

Formula One World Championship career
- Nationality: (United States) American
- Active years: 1954–1960
- Team(s): Kuzma, Kurtis Kraft, Lesovsky
- Entries: 7 (5 starts)
- Championships: 0
- Wins: 0
- Podiums: 0
- Career points: 0
- Pole positions: 0
- Fastest laps: 0
- First entry: 1954 Indianapolis 500
- Last entry: 1960 Indianapolis 500

Bob Christie (April 4, 1924 – June 1, 2009) was an American racecar driver. Christie raced in the USAC Championship Car series in the 1956-1963 seasons, with 15 career starts, including every Indianapolis 500 race in that span. He finished in the top-ten five times, with his best finish in third position in 1959 at Daytona. He died in Grants Pass, Oregon.

== Indianapolis 500 results ==
Year	Car	Start	Qual	Rank	Finish	Laps	Led	Retired
1956	57	25	142.236	20	13	196	0	Flagged
1957	95	33	139.779	32	13	197	0	Flagged
1958	65	17	142.253	33	14	189	0	Spun T3
1959	65	24	143.244	13	25	109	0	Rod bolt
1960	38	14	143.638	19	10	200	0	Running
1961	32	16	144.782	24	17	132	0	Piston
1962	29	31	146.341	29	30	17	0	Crash FS
1963	52	18	149.123	16	19	126	0	Crash T4
Totals						1166	0	

Starts	8
Poles	0
Front Row	0
Wins	0
Top 5	0
Top 10	1
Retired	5

== Complete Formula One World Championship results ==
(key)

Year	Entrant	Chassis	Engine	1	2	3	4	5	6	7	8	9	10	11	WDC	Points
1954	Christy	Lesovsky	Offenhauser L4	ARG	500; DNQ	BEL	FRA	GBR	GER	SUI	ITA	ESP			NC	0
1955	Dean Van Lines	Kuzma Indy Roadster	Dodge V8	ARG	MON	500; DNQ	BEL	NED	GBR	ITA					NC	0
1956	Helse / H.H. Johnson	Kurtis Kraft 500D	Offenhauser L4	ARG	MON	500; 13	BEL	FRA	GBR	GER	ITA				NC	0
1957	Jones & Maley Cars	Kurtis Kraft 500C	Offenhauser L4	ARG	MON	500; 13	FRA	GBR	GER	PES	ITA				NC	0
1958	Federal Engineering	Kurtis Kraft 500C	Offenhauser L4	ARG	MON	NED	500; 14	BEL	FRA	GBR	GER	POR	ITA	MOR	NC	0
1959	Federal Engineering	Kurtis Kraft 500C	Offenhauser L4	MON	500; 25	NED	FRA	GBR	GER	POR	ITA	USA			NC	0
1960	Federal Engineering	Kurtis Kraft 500C	Offenhauser L4	ARG	MON	500; 10	NED	BEL	FRA	GBR	POR	ITA	USA		NC	0
