= Paul Goldsmith (racing driver) =

American racing driver (1925–2024)

- Goldsmith in 1964
- Born: October 2, 1925 Parkersburg, West Virginia, U.S.
- Died: September 6, 2024 (aged 98) Munster, Indiana, U.S.

Championship titles
- USAC Stock Car (1961, 1962); Major victories AMA Daytona 200 (1953); NASCAR Daytona Beach (1958)

AAA/USAC Stock Car career
- Years active: 1954, 1958, 1960–1963, 1965–1967
- Starts: 85
- Championships: 2
- Wins: 26
- Podiums: 44
- Poles: 25
- Best finish: 1st in 1961, 1962

NASCAR Cup Series career
- 127 races run over 11 years
- Best finish: 5th (1966)
- First race: 1956 Race 9 (Lakewood)
- Last race: 1969 Yankee 600 (Michigan)
- First win: 1956 Race 47 (Langhorne)
- Last win: 1966 Volunteer 500 (Bristol)
Wins	Top tens	Poles
9	59	8

Champ Car career
- 8 races run over 7 years
- Best finish: 10th (1959)
- First race: 1958 Indianapolis 500 (Indianapolis)
- Last race: 1963 Indianapolis 500 (Indianapolis)
Wins	Podiums	Poles
0	1	0

Formula One World Championship career
- Active years: 1958–1960
- Team(s): Kurtis Kraft, Epperly
- Entries: 3
- Championships: 0
- Wins: 0
- Podiums: 1
- Career points: 6
- Pole positions: 0
- Fastest laps: 0
- First entry: 1958 Indianapolis 500
- Last entry: 1960 Indianapolis 500

Paul Edward Goldsmith (October 2, 1925 – September 6, 2024) was an American racing driver. During his career he raced motorcycles, stock cars, and Indianapolis cars, achieving success in each discipline.

Goldsmith won the USAC Stock Car national championship in 1961 and 1962, driving a Pontiac for Ray Nichels. Earlier in his career, he was a successful motorcycle racer within the AMA circuit, capturing the Daytona 200 for Harley-Davidson in 1953. In 1958, driving a Pontiac for Smokey Yunick, Goldsmith won the final NASCAR stock car race on the Daytona Beach road course.

At the time of his death, Goldsmith was the oldest living former driver to have competed in the FIA World Drivers' Championship, as well as the oldest living veteran of the Indianapolis 500; he and A. J. Foyt were the last living competitors from the 1958 Indianapolis 500.

== Early life ==
Born on October 2, 1925, in Parkersburg, West Virginia, Goldsmith relocated to Detroit, Michigan, with his family at an early age.

During the Second World War, Goldsmith served in the United States Merchant Marine. After the war, he worked full-time at a Chrysler plant in Detroit. He co-owned a service station in Royal Oak, Michigan, until 1952.

== Motorcycle career ==
Goldsmith began riding motorcycles soon after the end of the Second World War. His racing career began by accident in 1946, while spectating an event at Partington Pastures in Sterling Heights, Michigan. A lower number of riders appeared than had been expected, and Goldsmith was invited to participate, finishing third. He soon began competing locally every weekend.

Goldsmith would race Harley-Davidsons throughout his cycling career, possibly inspired by Leo Anthony, a Michigan-born rider at the peak of his career in 1946. During 1947, Goldsmith earned the backing of leading Detroit Harley-Davidson dealer Earl Robinson. Teaming up with Robinson's chief mechanic, Boots Carnegie, Goldsmith campaigned throughout the county fair circuit of the Midwest. By 1948, Goldsmith had achieved Expert rating from the AMA. In March of that year, he competed in his first Daytona 200, finishing in fifth position.

In 1950, Goldsmith increasingly ran among the leaders. His first Class C podium came at Strawberry Hill Raceway, near Richmond, Virginia, where he finished third in a 10-mile race. During the year, Goldsmith scored two further podiums – third place in a 20-mile event at Bay Meadows, in San Mateo, California; and third in a 5-mile national at the Iowa State Fairgrounds. During the 1951 season, Goldsmith repeated his performance at Strawberry Hill. He later finished second at the Iowa State Fairgrounds, the best finish of his career up to that point. Goldsmith scored his third and final podium of the season in an 8-mile national at Williams Grove Speedway, in Mechanicsburg, Pennsylvania.

=== Harley–Davidson relationship, and AMA success ===
In 1952, Goldsmith competed until midway though the season before scoring his first podium of the year, a third place in the Class C National Championship event, a 25-mile race held at the Illinois State Fairgrounds. The following week, Goldsmith scored the first victory of his career, winning at the Milwaukee Mile, close to the headquarters of Harley-Davidson. In the 15-mile event, extended four extra laps due to a caution, Goldsmith beat Ernie Beckman to the flag. Two weeks later, he finished second in a 5-mile event at the Indiana State Fairgrounds. During the season Goldsmith was hired to compete directly for Harley-Davidson. Offered the new KR model, he disliked the handling, and continued competing on an older WR while working on the handling and tuning of the KR model in order to bring it up to speed.

For the opening race of the 1953 season, the Daytona 200 on the Daytona Beach road course, Goldsmith entered riding the newly developed Harley-Davidson KR-TT road-racing variant of the KR model introduced the season before. While in Daytona Beach, Goldsmith would work on his cycles at the race shop owned by famed local racer Marshall Teague. It was on one such occasion that Goldsmith first met and began consulting famed local mechanic Henry "Smokey" Yunick, going on to impress him with his racing style and work ethic. Goldsmith prepared diligently for the event, fine-tuning his engine and testing repeatedly on local roads.

On March 14, starting in the second row, Goldsmith took the lead on the first lap heading into the North turn, before being passed by John Hicks on the back stretch. By the ninth lap, Goldsmith had settled into third place, behind the Triumphs of Hicks and Ed Kretz. For the duration of the event, Goldsmith would adhere to a remarkably consistent pace; his lap times for the duration of the 48-lap event on the 4.1 mile course varied by less than three seconds of one another. On the tenth lap, a serious accident occurred, which bunched up the field, allowing Kretz and Goldsmith to pass Hicks. On lap 21, shortly before the midpoint of the race, Goldsmith passed Kretz for the lead heading into the north turn. Goldsmith would run the remainder of the event unchallenged, setting a new record time of 94.45 MPH. His victory was Harley-Davidson's first at the event since 1940.

Goldsmith followed up his victory at Daytona with a third place at the Ohio State Fairgrounds 10-mile event. At Dodge City Raceway, in Dodge City, Kansas, Goldsmith had built up a two-mile lead by the quarter mark of a 200-mile event, before running out of gas. Later in 1953, he won a 100-mile event at the grueling Langhorne Speedway cinder track. Goldsmith was voted the AMA Most Popular Rider of the Year for his efforts during the season.

During the 1954 Daytona 200, Goldsmith again took the lead on the opening lap before settling into a consistent pace, running second behind Joe Leonard. Goldsmith inherited the lead on the eighth lap, as Leonard dropped out with a mechanical issue. On the following lap, coming out of the South turn onto the beach, Goldsmith got caught up in the surf, ending his race. That season, the first in which the AMA applied a championship point system, Goldsmith took a victory in the Charity Newsies, a 10-mile national at the Ohio State Fairgrounds half mile. He also finished second at the San Mateo 20-mile event, and took third place at a 5-mile event at Portland Meadows in Portland, Oregon. Goldsmith finished second on the half mile oval at the Meade County Fairgrounds' 5-mile event in Sturgis, South Dakota. Goldsmith finished the season second in the AMA National point standings, behind Leonard, his former pupil. During the season Goldsmith continually finished in points and prize-paying positions.

In 1955, Goldsmith won his final AMA event, an 8-mile competition at Illiana Speedway, in Schererville, Indiana. He was frequently racing stock cars by this time. He recorded the final national podium of his career, a third at the Milwaukee Mile 9-mile event on August 27, 1955. Goldsmith finished the season eighth in points. Sometime before the 1956 AMA season, Goldsmith signed with Yunick to race Chevrolets during the 1956 NASCAR Grand National season. Goldsmith would soon leave motorcycle competition, pressured to run only stock cars by General Motors.

Goldsmith's final event of his motorcycle career was the 1956 Daytona 200. Goldsmith recalled afterwards that, "Ed Cole was on my fanny pretty good for riding. He told me I shouldn't be riding the bikes but driving full time for Chevy." Goldsmith said he "hated" giving up motorcycle racing, but made the decision because auto racing was "much bigger than Harley-Davidson."

== Stock car career ==
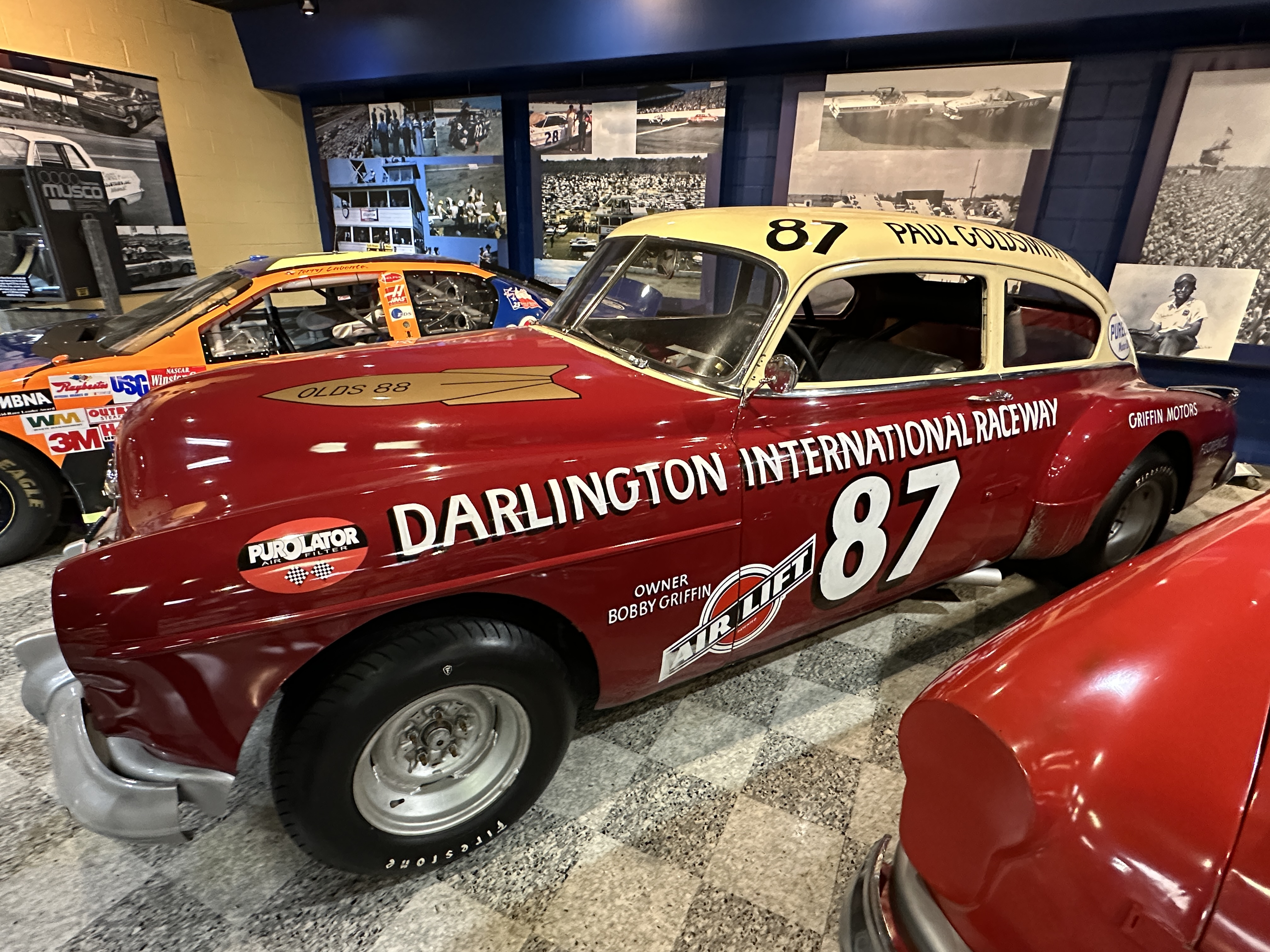
An Oldsmobile 88 driven by Goldsmith at the Darlington Raceway

Goldsmith first began racing automobiles in 1950, competing in regional events. He experienced quick success, winning his first ever event driving a modified Ford roadster, in a race in Detroit. Later, he won a 250-mile stock car event held during the 1953 Michigan State Fair. After initially being scored in second place, a later review of the scoring tape revealed Goldsmith the true winner. Goldsmith competed in his first top-level automobile race during 1954, a AAA Stock Car national championship race at the Milwaukee Mile. Starting 22nd in a field of 38, Goldsmith finished in 21st place.

=== Early NASCAR career (1956–1958) ===
During the 1956 Daytona Speedweeks, Goldsmith was competing in that year's Daytona 200 when he interacted with Yunick. Goldsmith had previously impressed Yunick by acing an improvised series of tests developed by Yunick. Yunick would offer prospective drivers a bit of candy from a snake nut can. Yunick later wrote in his autobiography, "[Goldsmith] caught the son-of-a-bitch snake coming out of the can. I've never seen anybody else that could catch it, even knowing what was going on." Yunick then asked Goldsmith to drive him around a race course set up on the Titusville-Cocoa Airport, located south of Daytona Beach. By Yunick's recollection, Goldsmith's performance lapping the course, as well as in a third test designed to gauge reflexes under braking, exceeded that of the previous record holders of Yunick's tests.

Yunick offered Goldsmith a ride driving his Chevrolet on the NASCAR Grand National circuit. Goldsmith's first appearance came on March 25 at Lakewood Speedway. Starting seventh, Goldsmith was involved in an accident on the 36th lap, ending the race 23rd. During the Southern 500 that year, Goldsmith started and finished the race in the top-five. The next event at Langhorne saw Goldsmith considered a dark horse, due to his strong performance at Darlington, and his previous motorcycling experience at Langhorne. Starting on the outside of the front row, Goldsmith dominated the 300 mile event. Leading 182 of 300 laps, Goldsmith beat runner-up Lee Petty by a seven-lap margin. In addition to his victory, Goldsmith recorded three other top-five finishes in nine races during 1956.

After continuing with Chevrolet for the first few rounds of the 1957 season, Yunick switched to Ford following the Daytona Beach race. Competing with them for the first several months of the season, their factory-backing was cut off after the Automobile Manufacturers Association (AMA) instituted a ban on factory programs in June, in response to increasing public concern over highway safety. During the 1957 Southern 500 held on September 2 at Darlington Raceway, which he had been favored by many to win, Goldsmith sustained serious injuries in an accident which also seriously injured Fonty Flock and killed Bobby Myers. Running for Yunick and occasionally Pete DePaolo, Goldsmith would finish the season with four wins and six other top-five finishes in 25 events that season. Most notable was the Raleigh 250, run on July 4.

In 1958, Goldsmith was the winner of the final Grand National race at the famous Daytona Beach Road Course. His victory would make him the only racer to win the Daytona Beach road course both in a stock car and on a motorcycle. Driving a Pontiac in the event, he led the race from start to finish. A few weeks later, Goldsmith quit the NASCAR circuit, motivated by a desire to race in the Indianapolis 500, sanctioned by the United States Auto Club (USAC).

=== Association with Ray Nichels ===
Goldsmith's win at Daytona had attracted the attention of Semon Knudsen, the general manager of GM's Pontiac division. Knudsen, seeking to change Pontiac's stodgy image with the public, had recently hired Ray Nichels, until recently an Indianapolis car mechanic, to begin building Pontiac into a performance brand. That fall, Knudsen arranged a meeting between Nichels and Goldsmith, after which the latter was hired to be Nichels' Pontiac development driver.

Working well together, Nichels soon hired Goldsmith directly, where he replaced Pat O'Connor as Nichels' Firestone test driver. Goldsmith would begin putting in thousands of miles of testing at the Indianapolis Motor Speedway and Southwestern track. For most of 1958 and 1959, Goldsmith's commitment to break into the Indianapolis establishment, and later his business commitments with Nichels meant he had little time for a robust racing schedule, competing in only a handful of Automobile Racing Club of America (ARCA) sanctioned stock car events in the Midwest.

=== USAC career (1960–1965) ===
==== 1960 ====
Goldsmith returned to racing in 1960, competing on the USAC circuit. While he recorded four poles, and finished near the front with regularity, he did not reach victory lane until the final race of the season, in Dayton. Taking the lead from Don White on the opening lap, Goldsmith dominated the event, leading from flag to flag, and only briefly being challenged by Tony Bettenhausen. Goldsmith earned a significant bonus for laps lead during the event, which took place on his 33rd birthday. The conclusion of the season saw Goldsmith and Nichels finish second in points, a significant margin behind the champion, Norm Nelson. In addition to his earnings from the Indianapolis 500, Goldsmith's prize money accrued during the Stock Car season saw him finish sixth overall among earners of all USAC-sanctioned series.

==== 1961 ====
Goldsmith opened the 1961 season with a victory in the Jimmy Bryan Memorial, held in Phoenix. Starting on the pole, Goldsmith was challenged by Rodger Ward during the early stages, before taking the lead for good on the 21st lap. In DuQuoin, Goldsmith, again on pole, dueled again with Ward, before taking the lead for good on the 63rd lap as Ward bobbled. At the 250-mile event at the Milwaukee Mile on September 17, the most prestigious event of the season, Goldsmith had a difficult race. Dropping out on lap 60, he took over teammate Len Sutton's car, only to drop out again on lap 130. Taking over the year-old Pontiac of Whitey Johnson, Goldsmith was able to fight to a leader lap finish of fifth place. In the final race of the season, at Trenton, Goldsmith came from behind to win the race as well as the championship, edging out Nelson, who finished fourth, for the title. Goldsmith won the 1961 USAC Stock Car national championship, with seven poles, ten wins, 16 top-five finishes in 19 races.

==== 1962 ====
Goldsmith again started strong for 1962. In a two-heat event at Riverside to open the season, Dan Gurney was disqualified from the first for lightening of his car. Goldsmith won the second heat over Gurney, and was declared the overall winner. Goldsmith won his second consecutive road-course event, the Peterborough Invitational Trophy at Circuit Mont-Tremblant, in Canada. The 250-mile event consisted again of two heats. The combined highest average time of the two heats determined the winner. Goldsmith finished second behind Ward in the first heat, and beat Ward in the second. His combined time was two-seconds faster. He won the USAC championship in 1962 with six poles, eight wins, and 15 top-five finishes in 20 races.

==== 1963 ====
Goldsmith and Nichels did not record as much success during the 1963 season, which saw Nichels Engineering transition from Pontiac to Plymouth factory support. Although they recorded three wins during the season, they also skipped several events, and suffered numerous mechanical DNFs. The end of the season saw Goldsmith seemingly ranked ninth in the points standings. In 1963, Goldsmith, in a Pontiac Tempest, won the non-championship NASCAR Challenge Cup at Daytona International Speedway, lapping a Ferrari 250 GTO multiple times.

==== Suspension from USAC ====
While a USAC regular, Goldsmith and Nichels occasionally participated in NASCAR-sanctioned events. Due to compete in the 1963 NASCAR season-ending Golden State 400 at Riverside on November 6, USAC informed Goldsmith's team at the end of October that USAC would not permit their drivers to participate in the event, despite it having an FIA-affiliation. This effective ban lead to all USAC drivers, except Goldsmith, to withdraw. Goldsmith, who later claimed never to have been notified directly by USAC, declared that as an employee of his team and Plymouth, he intended to uphold his obligation to compete.

Goldsmith did not participate in the original day of qualifying, instead setting his time during a last chance session on November 3. His time broke the recent track record set by Dan Gurney during the main qualifying session held on October 31. Despite being the quickest of all drivers, Goldsmith was forced to start from the middle of the field. Gurney, along with fellow USAC drivers A. J. Foyt, Parnelli Jones, Roger Penske, and Rodger Ward did not compete in the event. During the race, Goldsmith was taken out on the 42nd lap after being hit by Bob Bondurant.

The day following the race, Henry Banks, USAC official and a former driver, announced that Goldsmith had been suspended by USAC for a period of one year, and stripped him of his points earned during 1963. Goldsmith threatened to relocate to Mexico, which he claimed would allow him to compete as an FIA-licensed foreign driver. USAC responded by affirming that such an action would lead to no change in Goldsmith's status. Goldsmith and Nichels were soon rumored to compete in NASCAR during the 1964 Grand National season.

==== 1965 ====
Although Goldsmith's USAC suspension had expired in November 1964, it was March 23, 1965, before Goldsmith returned to Indianapolis for reinstatement, receiving his driver's card directly from Banks. Goldsmith and Nichels returned to the USAC Stock Car circuit for the second race of the season – the Yankee 300 at the Indianapolis Raceway Park (IRP) road course – edging out Parnelli Jones for pole position. Goldsmith fell to 15th place during the opening lap, after going off-course at the first turn. He finished in second behind the winner, Norm Nelson. At the IRP oval two races later, Goldsmith won over Nelson, driving the 150-mile event without pitting. Goldsmith won three more races heading into the final race of the season, but lost the championship to Norm Nelson during the final event of the season.

== Championship Car career ==
Goldsmith competed in eight races in the USAC Championship Car series, between 1958 and 1963 with six of those starts in the Indianapolis 500. He finished in the top five twice at Indianapolis, following up a fifth-place finish in 1959 with a third in 1960.

== World Drivers' Championship career ==
The AAA/USAC-sanctioned Indianapolis 500 was included in the FIA World Drivers' Championship from 1950 through 1960. Drivers competing at Indianapolis during those years were credited with World Drivers' Championship participation, and were eligible to score WDC points alongside those which they may have scored towards the AAA/USAC National Championship.

Goldsmith participated in three World Drivers' Championship races at Indianapolis. He finished in the top three once, and scored six World Drivers' Championship points.

== Personal life ==
During his racing career, Goldsmith became one of the first drivers to become a pilot, often flying to and from races. After his retirement from driving, flying primarily a Cessna 421, he transported engines and parts to and from races.

For several decades following racing, Goldsmith owned a series of ranches and restaurants.

Goldsmith remained an active pilot and worker, and was the owner-operator of the Griffith-Merrillville Airport in Griffith, Indiana.

Goldsmith died in Munster, Indiana, on September 6, 2024, at the age of 98.

== Awards and honors ==
Goldsmith has been inducted into the following halls of fame:

- Michigan Motorsports Hall of Fame (1986)
- Motorcycle Hall of Fame (1999)
- Motorsports Hall of Fame of America (2008)
- Indianapolis Motor Speedway Hall of Fame (2016)
- USAC Hall of Fame (2018)

== Motorsports career results ==
=== Indianapolis 500 results ===
Year	Car	Start	Qual	Rank	Finish	Laps	Led	Retired
1958	31	16	142.744	24	30	0	0	Crash T3
1959	99	16	142.670	19	5	200	0	Running
1960	99	26	142.783	27	3	200	0	Running
1961	10	17	144.741	25	14	160	0	Connecting Rod
1962	53	26	146.437	26	26	26	0	Magneto
1963	99	9	150.163	5	18	149	0	Crankshaft
Totals						735	0	

Starts	6
Poles	0
Front Row	0
Wins	0
Top 5	2
Top 10	2
Retired	4

Sporting positions
Preceded by Norm Nelson	USAC Stock Car Champion; 1961–1962	Succeeded by Don White
