= Elmer George =

American racing driver (1928–1976)

- Born: Elmer Ray George; July 5, 1928 Hockerville, Oklahoma, U.S.
- Died: May 31, 1976 (aged 47) Terre Haute, Indiana, U.S.

Champ Car career
- 58 races run over 11 years
- Years active: 1954–1964
- Best finish: 10th – 1957
- First race: 1955 Golden State 100 (Sacramento)
- Last race: 1963 Indianapolis 500 (Indianapolis)
- First win: 1957 Syracuse 100 (Syracuse)
Wins	Podiums	Poles
1	4	1

Formula One World Championship career
- Active years: 1955, 1957–1958
- Team(s): Kuzma, Kurtis Kraft, Schroeder
- Entries: 3 (1 start)
- Championships: 0
- Wins: 0
- Podiums: 0
- Career points: 0
- Pole positions: 0
- Fastest laps: 0
- First entry: 1955 Indianapolis 500
- Last entry: 1958 Indianapolis 500

Elmer Ray George (July 15, 1928 – May 31, 1976) was an American race car driver.

Born in Hockerville, Oklahoma, George died in Terre Haute, Indiana. He drove in the AAA and USAC Championship Car series, racing in the 1956–1963 seasons with 64 starts, including the Indianapolis 500 races in 1957, 1962, and 1963.

George finished in the top-ten 36 times, with one victory, in 1957 at Syracuse.

George was also the 1957 USAC Sprint Car Series champion.

== 1962 Bobby Ball Memorial race ==
On November 18, 1962, George suffered cuts and a left shoulder injury in a USAC Champ Car race held at the Arizona State Fairgrounds. Having hit another car's bumper, George lost control of his HOW Special, hit the guard rail before the grandstand, slid and headed towards the stands where he broke through a chain-link fence, landing upside down. 22 spectators were injured as a result.

== Personal ==
George was married to Mari Hulman George, daughter of Tony Hulman, owner of the Indianapolis Motor Speedway. Elmer and Mari had three daughters and one son, Tony George, founder of the Indy Racing League, and Ex-CEO of the Indianapolis Motor Speedway. Elmer had two children from a previous marriage, Joseph F. George and Carolyn Coffey.

During the late 1960s and early 1970s, George was the director of the Indianapolis Motor Speedway Radio Network.

On May 3, 1976, Mari filed for divorce. On the day of the 1976 Indianapolis 500 (May 30, 1976), Elmer George argued by telephone with Guy Trolinger, a horse trainer at the family farm near Terre Haute, and Mari's alleged boyfriend. After the race, George drove to the farm, broke into the house and confronted Trolinger, then around 1:00 a.m., gunfire broke out, and George was shot and killed as a result of multiple gunshot wounds. A grand jury ruled that Trolinger killed George in self-defense, as George was armed and also discharged his firearm during the confrontation, at which point the charges were dropped.

== Award ==
George was inducted in the National Sprint Car Hall of Fame in 2005.

== Complete AAA/USAC Championship Car results ==
Year	1	2	3	4	5	6	7	8	9	10	11	12	13	Pos	Points
1954	INDY	MIL	LAN	DAR	SPR	MIL	DUQ	PIK	SYR	ISF; DNQ	SAC	PHX	LVG	-	0
1955	INDY; DNQ	MIL	LAN	SPR	MIL	DUQ	PIK	SYR	ISF	SAC; 7	PHX; DNQ			37th	60
1956	INDY	MIL; 18	LAN; 8	DAR; 7	ATL; 19	SPR; DNQ	MIL; 20	DUQ; 6	SYR; 18	ISF; 14	SAC; 5	PHX; 7		20th	410
1957	INDY; 33	LAN; 17	MIL; 7	DET; 5	ATL; 15	SPR; 6	MIL; 6	DUQ; 4	SYR; 1	ISF; 6	TRE; 21	SAC; 10	PHX; 16	10th	830
1958	TRE; 12	INDY; DNQ	MIL; 17	LAN; 13	ATL; 8	SPR; 2	MIL; DNQ	DUQ; DNS	SYR; 16	ISF; 10	TRE; DNQ	SAC; 17	PHX; 8	19th	300
1959	DAY; 6	TRE; 6	INDY; DNQ	MIL; DNQ	LAN; 5	SPR	MIL	DUQ	SYR	ISF	TRE	SAC	PHX	25th	233
1960	TRE	INDY	MIL	LAN; DNQ	SPR; 3	MIL	DUQ; 14	SYR; 8	ISF; DNQ	TRE	SAC; 13	PHX; 6		21st	270
1961	TRE; 8	INDY	MIL; 8	LAN; 4	MIL; DNQ	SPR; 8	DUQ; 14	SYR; 6	ISF; 15	TRE	SAC; 6	PHX; 9		13th	470
1962	TRE; DNQ	INDY; 17	MIL; 18	LAN; DNQ	TRE; DNQ	SPR; 10	MIL; 17	LAN; DNQ	SYR; 18	ISF; 18	TRE	SAC; 3	PHX; 16	18th	229
1963	TRE	INDY; 30	MIL	LAN	TRE	SPR	MIL	DUQ	ISF	TRE	SAC; DNQ	PHX		-	0
1964	PHX	TRE	INDY; DNQ	MIL	LAN	TRE	SPR	MIL	DUQ	ISF	TRE	SAC	PHX	-	0

== Indianapolis 500 results ==
Year	Car	Start	Qual	Rank	Finish	Laps	Led	Retired
1957	23	9	140.729	22	33	0	0	Crash BS
1962	21	17	146.092	33	17	146	0	Engine
1963	21	28	147.893	31	30	21	0	Handling
Totals						167	0	

Starts	3
Poles	0
Front Row	0
Wins	0
Top 5	0
Top 10	0
Retired	3

== World Championship career summary ==
The Indianapolis 500 was part of the FIA World Championship from 1950 through 1960. Drivers competing at Indy during those years were credited with World Championship points and participation. George participated in the 1957 Indianapolis 500, his only World Championship race. He finished 33rd and did not accumulate any championship points.
