= Kurtis Kraft 500 =

Series of open-wheel race cars

Kurtis Kraft 500B Kurtis Kraft 500C Kurtis Kraft 500F Kurtis Kraft 500G
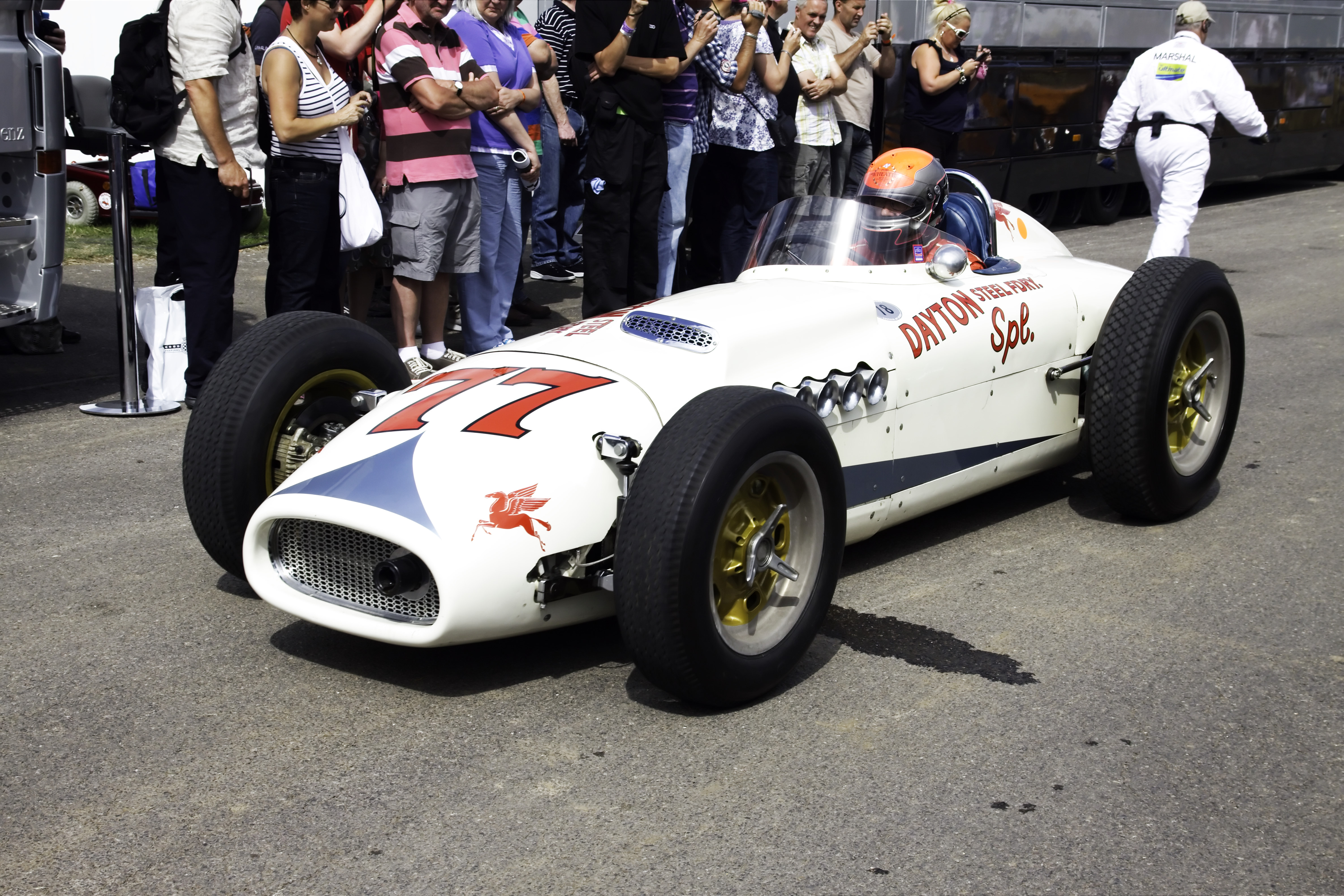
- Category: AAA/U.S.A.C. IndyCar

Technical specifications
- Chassis: Steel tube frame, aluminum body
- Suspension: Leading/trailing link torsion bar suspension
- Wheelbase: 96.5–98 in (2,451–2,489 mm)
- Engine: Offenhauser 255–270 cu in (4.2–4.4 L) 16-valve, DOHC I4 naturally-aspirated FR; Novi 183 cu in (3.0 L) 16-valve, 90° DOHC V8 supercharged FR FR
- Transmission: Offenhauser 2/3-speed manual
- Power: 325–480 hp (242–358 kW) @ 6000 rpm, 340 lb⋅ft (461 N⋅m) torque (Offenhauser engine); 450–734 hp (336–547 kW) @ 8000 rpm (Novi engine)
- Weight: 1,500–1,919 lb (680.4–870.4 kg)
- Tires: Firestone

Competition history

The Kurtis Kraft 500B, 500C, 500F, and 500G, are a series of open-wheel race cars, designed, developed and built by Kurtis Kraft, for AAA and U.S.A.C. Indy car racing, between 1948 and 1960.
