= Chuck Rodee =

American racing driver

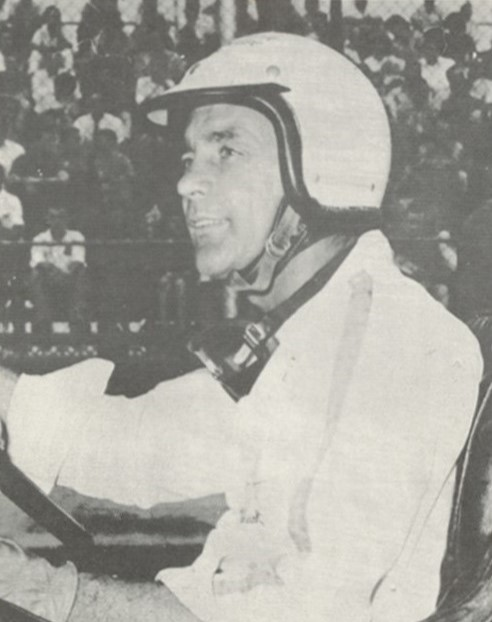
Rodee, circa 1963

Chuck Rodee (born Charles Joseph Rodeghier; September 8, 1927 – May 14, 1966) was an American racecar driver who died while attempting to qualify for the 1966 Indianapolis 500.

== Midget car racing career ==
Rodee won the Fort Wayne Indoor midget car title in 1955 at the 1/10 mile cement track, and finished third in the USAC National Midget championship. He repeated with Fort Wayne championships in 1957 and 1958. He collected his fourth track championship in 1966 before his death. He finished second in the 1956 USAC National Midget points, and third in 1965.

== Championship car career ==
Rodee drove in the USAC Championship Car series, racing in the 1957, 1958, 1960, and 1962–1965 seasons. He finished in the top-ten four times, with his best finish in fifth position in 1965 at Atlanta. He had 16 career starts, including the Indianapolis 500 races in 1962 and 1965. He finished in 32nd in 1962 after crashing to avoid Jack Turner, and 28th in 1965.

== Death ==
Rodee died while attempting to qualify for the 1966 Indianapolis 500. He spun on a second lap warm-up and backed the car into the wall exiting Turn 1. The impact appeared minor but the rigid chassis transferred virtually the entire force of the crash to the driver. Rodee suffered a ruptured aorta and lapsed into a coma. He was pronounced dead after emergency surgery failed to save him.

== Career award ==
- Rodee was inducted in the National Midget Auto Racing Hall of Fame.

== Indianapolis 500 results ==
Year	Car	Start	Qual	Rank	Finish	Laps	Led	Retired
1962	88	21	146.969	16	27	23	0	Steering
1965	19	30	154.546	25	28	28	0	Rear End
Totals						51	0	

Starts	2
Poles	0
Front Row	0
Wins	0
Top 5	0
Top 10	0
Retired	2

== See also ==
- List of Indianapolis fatalities
