= Len Sutton =

American racing driver (1925–2006)

- Born: Lenard Dale Sutton; August 9, 1925 Aims, Oregon, U.S.
- Died: December 4, 2006 (aged 81) Portland, Oregon, U.S.

Champ Car career
- 74 races run over 11 years
- Years active: 1955–1965
- Best finish: 7th – 1961, 1962
- First race: 1955 Golden State 100 (Sacramento)
- Last race: 1965 Langhorne 100 (Langhorne)
- First win: 1958 Trenton 100 (Trenton)
- Last win: 1960 Milwaukee 200 (Milwaukee)
Wins	Podiums	Poles
3	8	1

Formula One World Championship career
- Active years: 1956, 1958–1960
- Team(s): Lesovsky, Kurtis Kraft, Watson, Kuzma
- Entries: 4 (3 starts)
- Championships: 0
- Wins: 0
- Podiums: 0
- Career points: 0
- Pole positions: 0
- Fastest laps: 0
- First entry: 1956 Indianapolis 500
- Last entry: 1960 Indianapolis 500

Len Sutton (August 9, 1925 – December 3, 2006) was an American racecar driver. He is best known for finishing second at the 1962 Indianapolis 500.

== Early racing career ==
A lifelong resident of Portland, Oregon, Sutton became involved in auto racing after serving in the Navy during World War II. He spun out in the first corner on his first lap at a dirt track. Sutton won Oregon Racing Association championships in 1949, 1950, 1954, and 1955. He flipped his car to avoid cattle during the 1954 Carrera Panamericana road race (now Baja 1000). He was in a body cast for four months. He also won midget car racing championships in Portland before he headed east to become a national touring driver.

== National circuits ==
Sutton raced in the AAA and USAC Championship Car series from 1955 to 1965, with 76 career starts, 43 top-ten finishes, and 3 victories.

Sutton completed his rookie test for the Indianapolis 500 in 1956. He flipped his car while attempting 140 miles per hour for the 1957 Indianapolis 500. He slide upside down with his helmet scraping the asphalt for nearly 1000 feet (300 m). A report in the following day's Indianapolis News said "Sutton was at first believed dead by observers on the scene." His injuries included broken shoulder, serious abrasions on his back, and a fractured skull. He returned to Indianapolis the following year and made his first start in the event. That year, he finished 32nd after being eliminated in a multi-car accident during the first lap. He competed in the 500 six more times and had his best result in 1962. After starting the race fourth, he led nine laps and finished second behind his teammate Rodger Ward. The next year, he set an unofficial Indianapolis Motor Speedway record when he went over 155 miles per hour (249 km/h) during a tire test.

Known for his versatility as a driver, Sutton also competed in roadsters, midgets, sprint cars, and stock cars. He finished 31st in the 1963 Daytona 500. Sutton decided to retire from driving during a 1965 race at Langhorne Speedway. Fellow competitor Mel Kenyon was severely burned in the race.

== Broadcaster after retirement and death ==
After retiring from driving, Sutton went into broadcasting and was a member of the Indianapolis Motor Speedway Radio Network for many years.

Sutton died at his home in Portland at the age of 81 after a long battle with cancer.

== Awards ==
- Sutton was inducted in the West Coast Stock Car Hall of Fame in 2005
- Sutton was a member of the Oregon Sports Hall of Fame
- Sutton was named to the National Midget Auto Racing Hall of Fame in 2009

== Complete AAA/USAC Championship Car results ==
Year	1	2	3	4	5	6	7	8	9	10	11	12	13	14	15	16	17	18	Pos	Points
1955	INDY	MIL	LAN	SPR	MIL	DUQ	PIK	SYR	ISF	SAC; 17	PHX; 17								-	0
1956	INDY; DNQ	MIL	LAN	DAR	ATL	SPR	MIL	DUQ	SYR	ISF	SAC; 18	PHX							-	0
1957	INDY	LAN	MIL	DET	ATL	SPR; DNQ	MIL; 19	DUQ; 7	SYR; 17	ISF; 4	TRE; 4	SAC; DNQ	PHX; 17						16th	300
1958	TRE; 1	INDY; 32	MIL; 11	LAN; 9	ATL; 4	SPR; 9	MIL; 9	DUQ; 6	SYR; DNQ	ISF; DNQ	TRE; 8	SAC; DNQ	PHX; 9						11th	670
1959	DAY; 20	TRE; 16	INDY; 32	MIL; 10	LAN; 14	SPR; 1	MIL; 19	DUQ; 4	SYR; 8	ISF; 5	TRE; 22	SAC; 16	PHX; 11						9th	520
1960	TRE; 18	INDY; 30	MIL; 3	LAN	SPR; 8	MIL; 1	DUQ; DNQ	SYR; DNQ	ISF; 7	TRE; 5	SAC; 10	PHX; DNQ							8th	780
1961	TRE; DNQ	INDY; 19	MIL; 4	LAN	MIL; 2	SPR; 10	DUQ; 9	SYR; 9	ISF; 4	TRE; 11	SAC; 4	PHX; 8							7th	860
1962	TRE; 7	INDY; 2	MIL; 15	LAN	TRE	SPR	MIL; 20	LAN	SYR; DNP	ISF	TRE; 2	SAC; 10	PHX; 9						7th	1,250
1963	TRE; 7	INDY; DNQ	MIL; 6	LAN	TRE; 21	SPR; 12	MIL; 12	DUQ; 13	ISF; DNQ	TRE	SAC; DNQ	PHX							20th	170
1964	PHX; 22	TRE	INDY; 15	MIL; 2	LAN	TRE; 10	SPR; 5	MIL; DNQ	DUQ; 11	ISF; 8	TRE; 15	SAC	PHX; DNQ						17th	338
1965	PHX	TRE	INDY; 12	MIL; 21	LAN; 7	PPR	TRE; DNQ	IRP	ATL	LAN	MIL	ISF	MIL	DSF	INF	TRE	SAC	PHX	35th	110

== Indianapolis 500 results ==
Year	Car	Start	Qual	Rank	Finish	Laps	Led	Retired
1958	68	27	142.653	27	32	0	0	Crash T3
1959	8	22	142.107	26	32	34	0	Crash T1
1960	9	5	145.443	7	30	47	0	Piston
1961	8	8	145.897	10	19	110	0	Clutch
1962	7	4	149.328	4	2	200	9	Running
1964	66	8	153.813	9	15	140	0	Magneto
1965	16	12	156.121	13	12	177	0	Flagged
Totals						708	9	

Starts	7
Poles	0
Front Row	0
Wins	0
Top 5	1
Top 10	1
Retired	5

== World Championship career summary ==
The Indianapolis 500 was part of the FIA World Championship from 1950 through 1960. Drivers competing at Indy during those years were credited with World Championship points and participation. Sutton participated in three World Championship races but scored no World Championship points.
