= Christensen (constructor) =

Racing car constructor

Christensen was a racing car constructor. Christensen cars competed in two rounds of the FIA World Championship - the 1959 and 1960 Indianapolis 500 races. They raced at Indy until 1963, the year in which they had their best result, 13th position with Bob Christie at the wheel.

== World Championship Indy 500 results ==
Season	Driver	Grid	Classification	Points	Note	Race Report	Reference
1959	Jack Turner	14	Ret		Fuel Leak	Report	
1960	Jim Hurtubise	23	Ret		Engine	Report	
