= Allen Crowe =

American racing driver (1928–1963)

- Born: Nowember 12, 1928
- Died: June 2, 1963; New Bremen Speedway
- Cause of death: Died from injuries sustained in a sprint car race
- Awards: Allen Crowe Memorial at Illinois State Fairgrounds Racetrack

Allen Moreland Crowe (November 12, 1928 – June 2, 1963) was an American race car driver.

Born in Springfield, Illinois, Crowe died in New Bremen, Ohio, from injuries sustained in a sprint car race at New Bremen Speedway. He drove in the USAC Championship Car series, racing in the 1961–1963 seasons with 15 starts, including the 1962 and 1963 Indianapolis 500 races. He finished in the top-ten six times, with his best finish in fifth position in 1962 at Syracuse.

The ARCA Menards Series 100-mile (160 km) race at the Illinois State Fairgrounds Racetrack is named in his memory.
