= Jack Turner (racing driver) =

American racecar driver

- Born: February 12, 1920; Seattle, Washington, U.S.
- Died: September 12, 2004 (aged 84); Renton, Washington, U.S.

Formula One World Championship career
- Nationality: (United States) American
- Active years: 1956–1960
- Team(s): Christensen, Kurtis Kraft, Lesovsky
- Entries: 5 (4 starts)
- Championships: 0
- Wins: 0
- Podiums: 0
- Career points: 0
- Pole positions: 0
- Fastest laps: 0
- First entry: 1956 Indianapolis 500
- Last entry: 1960 Indianapolis 500

John Ellsworth Turner Jr (February 12, 1920 Seattle, Washington – September 12, 2004 Renton, Washington) was an American racecar driver. He was nicknamed "Cactus Jack." He served in the South Pacific during the Second World War.

== Midget car career ==
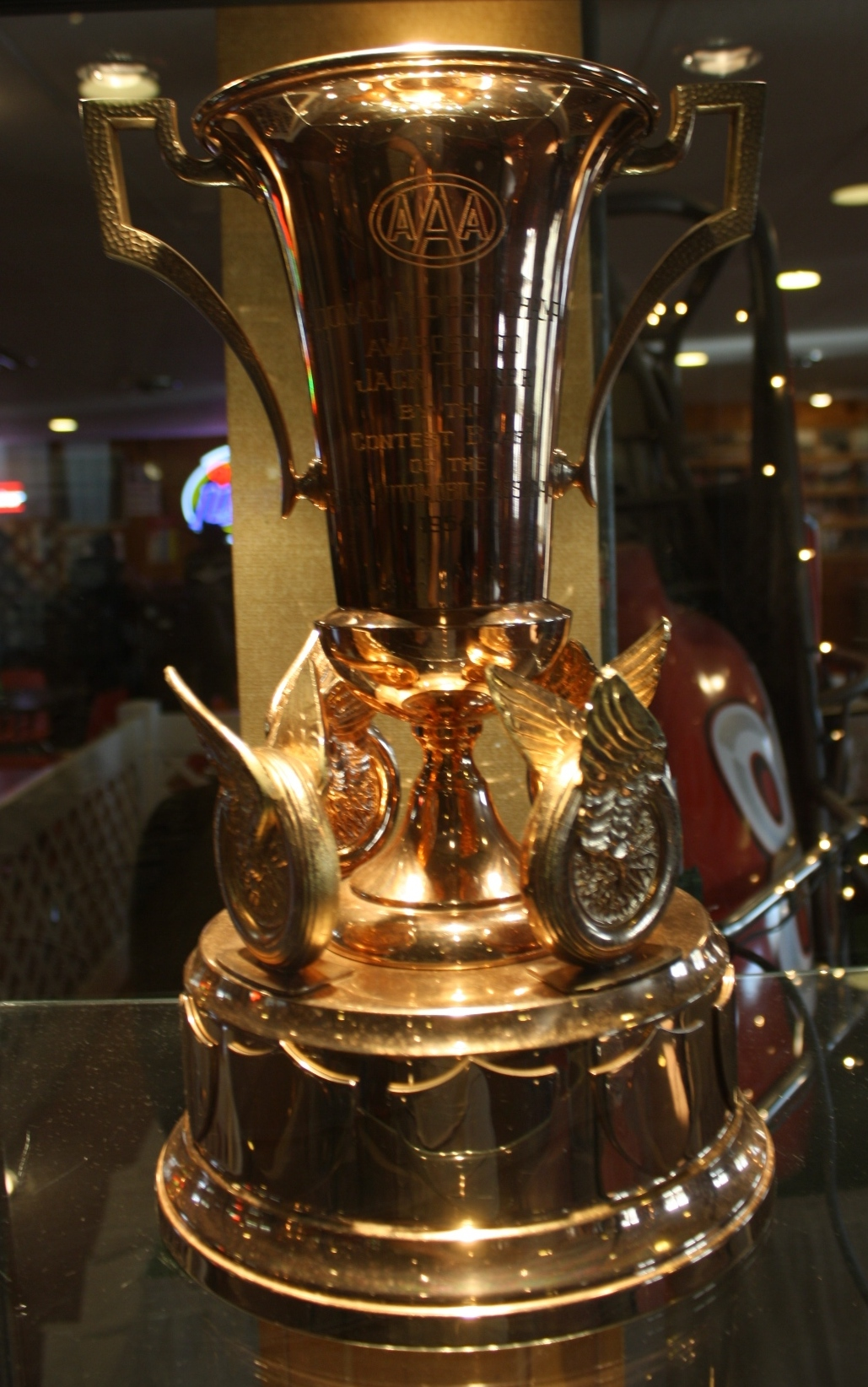
1954 AAA National Midget trophy

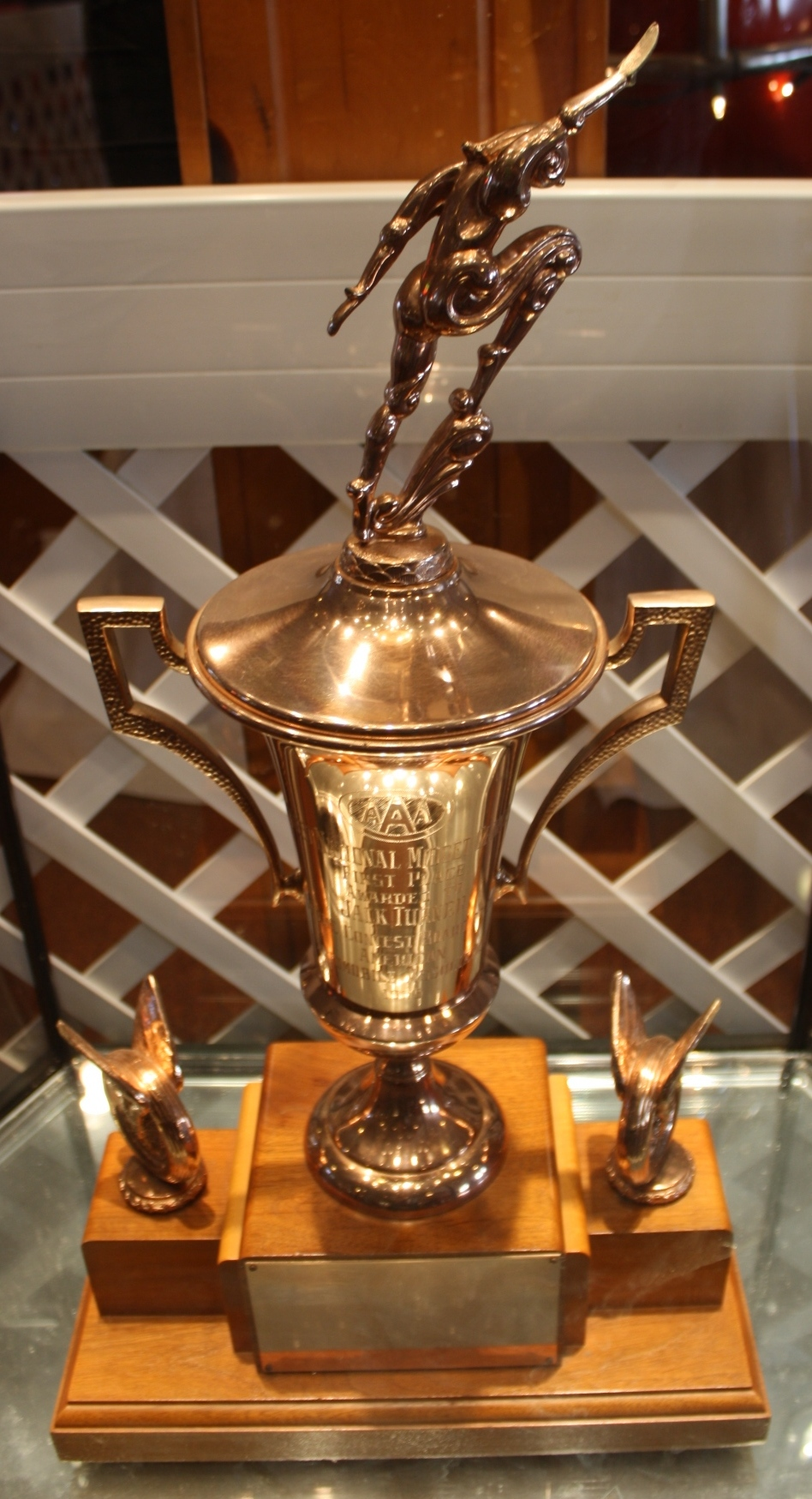
1955 AAA National Midget trophy

Turner became the first two-time AAA National Midget champion when he won the 1954 and 1955 championships. Turner scored no wins in 1954 despite competing at the entire circuit, and won the championship on consistent high finishes. He won six features in 1955. He also had 14 National USAC wins in his career.

== Champ car ==
Turner drove in the AAA and USAC Championship Car series, racing in the 1955–1962 seasons with 35 starts, including the Indianapolis 500 races in 1956-1959 and 1961–1962. He finished in the top-ten 35 times, with his best finish in second position in 1956 at Darlington. He retired from racing after flipping his car during a practice run at Indy in 1963. It was his third flip in three years at the track: first down the main straightaway in 1961, second he broke his pelvis at the head of the frontstretch, and third he crushed a vertebra.

== Career award ==
Turner was inducted into the National Midget Auto Racing Hall of Fame in the inaugural 1984 class.

== Indy 500 results ==
Year	Car	Start	Qual	Rank	Finish	Laps	Led	Retired
1956	54	24	142.394	18	25	131	0	Engine trouble
1957	19	19	140.367	25	11	200	0	Running
1958	25	10	143.438	12	25	21	0	Fuel pump
1959	24	14	143.478	11	27	47	0	Fuel tank
1961	45	21	144.904	21	25	52	0	Crash FS
1962	45	25	146.496	25	29	17	0	Crash FS
Totals						468	0	

Starts	6
Poles	0
Front Row	0
Wins	0
Top 5	0
Top 10	0
Retired	5

== World Championship career summary ==
The Indianapolis 500 was part of the FIA World Championship from 1950 through 1960. Drivers competing at Indy during those years were credited with World Championship points and participation. Turner participated in four World Championship races but scored no World Championship points.
