= Lesovsky =

Racing car constructor

Lesovsky was a racing car constructor. Lesovsky roadsters competed in the Indy 500 from 1949 to 1963.

== World Championship Indy 500 results ==
Season	Driver	Grid	Classification	Points	Note	Race Report
1950	George Connor	4	8			Report
1950	Troy Ruttman	24	15			Report
1951	George Connor	21	Ret		Transmission	Report
1952	Duane Carter	6	4	3		Report
1952	Henry Banks	12	19			Report
1952	Manny Ayulo	28	20			Report
1953	Duane Carter	27	Ret	2	Ignition	Report
1956	Jimmy Reece	21	9			Report
1957	Gene Hartley	14	10			Report
1957	Rodger Ward	24	Ret		Compressor	Report
1958	Jack Turner	10	Ret		Fuel Pump	Report
1958	Rodger Ward	11	Ret		Magneto	Report
1959	Johnny Thomson	1	3	4		Report
1959	Len Sutton	22	Ret		Accident	Report
1960	Johnny Thomson	17	5	2		Report
