= Novi engine =

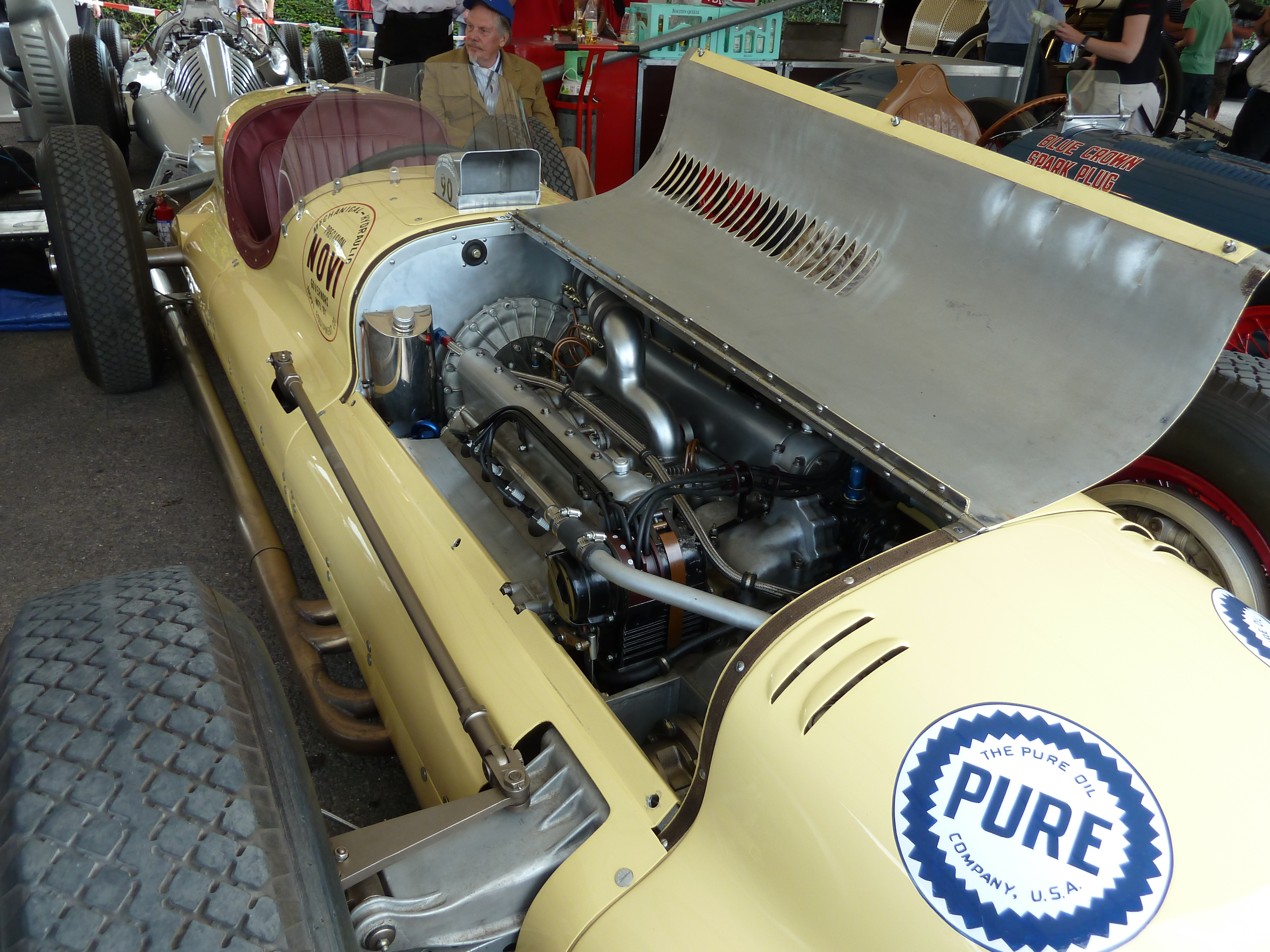

Overview
- Production: 1941–1966

Layout
- Configuration: V8, supercharged, 90° cylinder angle
- Displacement: 181 cu in (2.966 L)
- Cylinder bore: 3.185 in (80.9 mm)
- Piston stroke: 2.84 in (72.1 mm)
- Cylinder block material: Cast iron
- Cylinder head material: Cast iron
- Valvetrain: 16-valve, DOHC, two-valves per cylinder

Combustion
- Fuel system: Carburetors
- Fuel type: Gasoline
- Oil system: Dry sump

Output
- Power output: 550–837 hp (410–624 kW)

Dimensions
- Dry weight: 470–585 lb (213–265 kg)

The Novi engine is an American dual overhead cam supercharged V8 engine used in racing cars in the Indianapolis 500 from 1941 to 1966. Designed by Bud Winfield and Leo Goossen, it was built by Fred Offenhauser.

== Early years ==
The Novi was first used in 1941 at the Indianapolis 500 under the "Winfield" name; it produced over 450 hp (340 kW), an amazing output for the time. It was fitted to a 1935 frame built for a Miller engine, but its power made the vehicle very difficult to handle.

After World War II, the Novi was used again in 1946 in the Indianapolis 500, developed with 510 horsepower and fitted in a more advanced Kurtis Kraft front-drive chassis. It performed well in a car driven by Ralph Hepburn, who set the track record and led the field for 44 laps. Drivers such as Paul Russo and Duke Nalon later drove cars powered by the engine at notable speeds, but did not win. In 1949, Nalon's Novi was involved in a spectacular crash; his car hit the wall in turn three, rupturing the gasoline tank and creating a wall of fire most of the way through the turn.

The engine's crowd-pleasing sound was caused by its gear-driven centrifugal supercharger, which turned at more than five (5.35) times the crankshaft speed, giving it a scream at full power. The engine's four camshafts and oversized-valve design also contributed to an exhaust noise much louder than other engines of its period, resulting in a deep-bass roar. The whole Novi package became legendary; it was known for being dangerously powerful, especially after racing veterans Hepburn and Chet Miller both died, in 1948 and 1953, respectively, driving the vehicles powered by Novi engines in practice.

== Rise to competitiveness ==
After years of haggling, Frank Kurtis finally convinced Novi owner Lew Welch to switch to a rear-drive chassis design that would be much more competitive than the increasingly obsolete front-drive chassis. Kurtis designed the new Novi, which featured a prominent tail fin and has been described as the most beautiful roadster ever seen at Indianapolis.

In 1956, Paul Russo qualified in eighth position. The second Novi car, driven by Jimmy Davies, failed to qualify due to technical complications on the last day. During the race, Russo quickly gained an early lead in the new finned Novi. Russo led the Indianapolis 500 from laps 11 to 21. At that point, a tire blew in the south-west corner, throwing Russo and the Novi into the wall and out of the race.

In 1957, a new sponsor financed two Novi-powered cars, now re-branded as the Automobile Air Conditioner specials. Driven by Russo and Tony Bettenhausen, both cars qualified. Russo finished fourth, and Bettenhausen finished fifteenth.

The cars returned in 1958, driven by Russo (#15) and Bill Cheesbourg (#54). During practice, Juan Manuel Fangio, a five time Grand Prix world champion driver, drove the #54 Novi while he was classified as a "rookie" at the Brickyard. Speculation coursed through the pits that the world's most famous driver would drive the legendary Novi in the race, but he did not.

In a later interview, Fangio described his experience with the Novi and its owner,

Mr. Welch wanted me to test the Novi and I liked to do it; and I found that I could not be in conditions to drive any other new car (in spite of which Mr. Welch offered him an important amount of money to qualify and race his Novi). I did several laps at 135mph as an average, and I enjoyed them a lot, especially when I noticed Paul Russo was also in the track at the same time, with a similar car.

Eyewitnesses to Fangio's Novi test noted that Fangio gained perceptibly on Russo, who could not pull away from the "rookie" driver on his first outing in a car that was deemed difficult to drive. Fangio described his shakedown cruise in the Novi,

I went out to the track only once with the Novi. I did about 10 laps and I was glad to find that the other driver of the team (Russo) could not pass me, nor even close the gap. The Novi was the only V8 engine in Indianapolis by then. It had a mechanical turbine and the power came suddenly at high revs, so being a difficult car to stop, like all the ones that used compressors. Even if the British Racing Motors V16 had a 16-cylinders engine, the Novi reminded me of that one for sure. The high power at high revs was hard on the tires, and it was very difficult to drive at Indianapolis because we had to accelerate while turning.

Following what he described as frustrations with the other car he had been offered (the #77 Offenhauser-powered roadster) and the bureaucratic complications arising from sponsors and team contracts that prevented him from driving the Novi, Fangio left Indianapolis. In July, he drove in the 1958 French Grand Prix, then retired. Welch's failure to land Fangio as his driver meant the Novi lost what could have been its best chance for an outright win at Indianapolis that year. In the 500, Cheesbourg finished tenth overall and Russo finished eighteenth.

In 1959 and 1960, two Novis were entered but their drivers failed to qualify. Russo and Dempsey Wilson were the drivers.

== Later years ==
Colorful car owner Andy Granatelli purchased the rights to the Novi before the 1961 racing season. Granatelli's team put the Novi's distinctive shriek back into action from 1961 to 1965, developing a four-wheel-drive version in 1964 in an attempt to effectively harness the extreme power of the notorious engine. Its notable drivers during this period were Jim Hurtubise, Art Malone, and Bobby Unser. The Novi engine was last used at Indy in 1966.

Despite never powering a Championship Car race winner, few engines have become as famous in automobile racing as the Novi.

The final STP-version of the Novi V8 had a revised two-stage centrifugal supercharger and was 2,741.29 cc (2.74 L, 167.28 cid) with bore and stroke of 81.28 mm × 66.04 mm (3.200 in × 2.600 in). At about 140 in Hg (~54 psi), an immense power output of 837 bhp (624 kW) at 8,200 rpm was achieved. This is equal to 305 bhp/liter (5.0 bhp/cu.in) and a brake mean effective pressure (bmep) of 483 lb/sq.in.

== Sources ==
- Ludvigsen, Karl (2001). Novi V-8: Indy Cars 1941-1965. Iconographix.
