= 1969 Indianapolis 500 =

American motor race

53rd Indianapolis 500
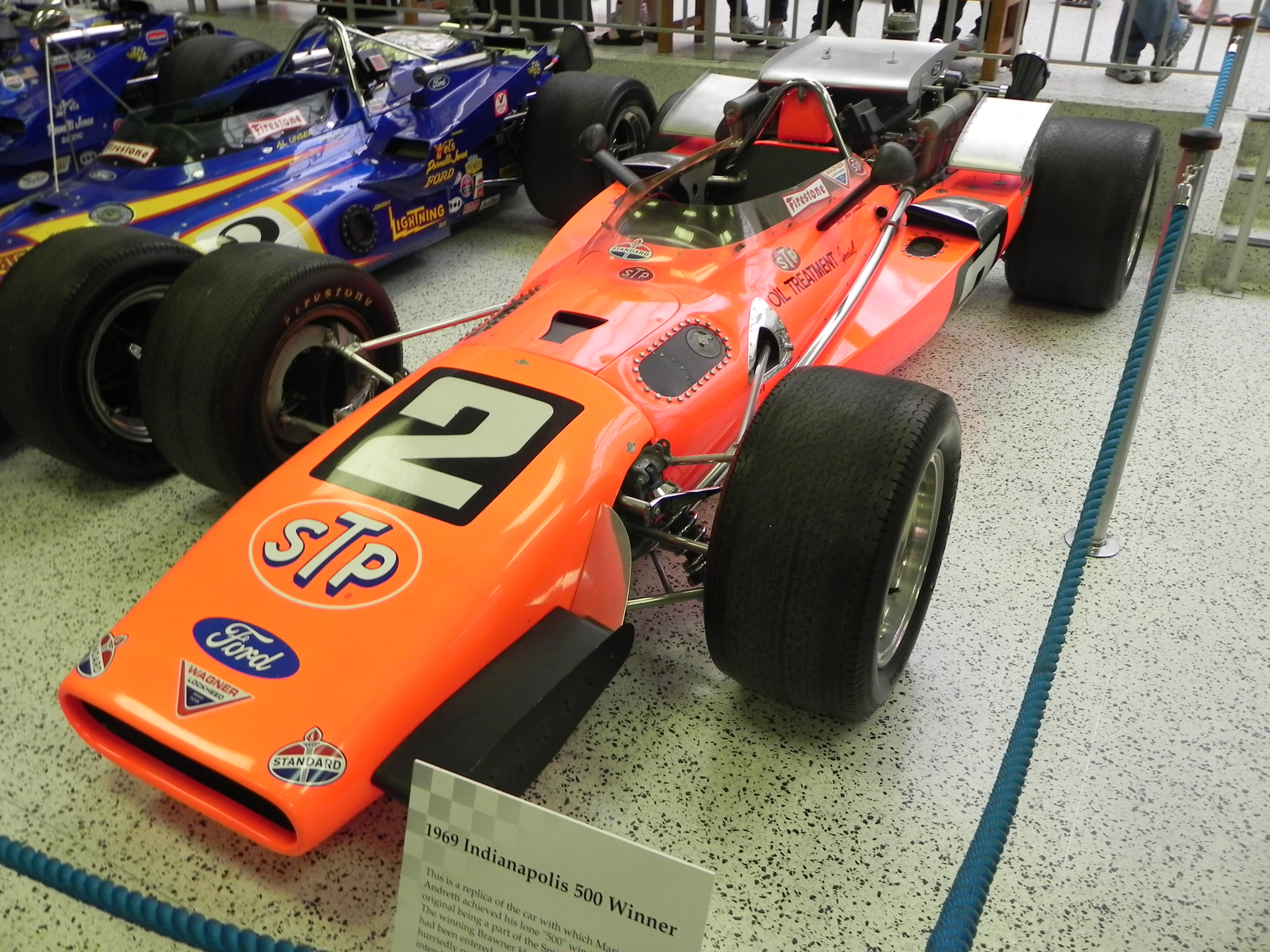

Indianapolis Motor Speedway

Indianapolis 500
- Sanctioning body: USAC
- Season: 1969 USAC season
- Date: May 30, 1969
- Winner: Mario Andretti
- Winning team: Andy Granatelli
- Winning Chief Mechanic: Clint Brawner & Jim McGee
- Time of race: 3:11:14.71
- Average speed: 156.867 mph (252.453 km/h)
- Pole position: A. J. Foyt
- Pole speed: 170.568 mph (274.503 km/h)
- Fastest qualifier: Foyt
- Rookie of the Year: Mark Donohue
- Most laps led: Mario Andretti (116)

Pre-race ceremonies
- National anthem: Purdue Band
- "Back Home Again in Indiana": Mack H. Shultz
- Starting command: Tony Hulman
- Pace car: Chevrolet Camaro SS
- Pace car driver: Jim Rathmann
- Starter: Pat Vidan
- Estimated attendance: 275,000

Television in the United States
- Network: ABC's Wide World of Sports
- Announcers: Jim McKay, Rodger Ward

Chronology
Previous	Next
1968	1970

The 53rd International 500 Mile Sweepstakes was an auto race held at the Indianapolis Motor Speedway in Speedway, Indiana on Friday, May 30, 1969. It was the third round of the 1969 USAC Championship Car season. Polesitter A. J. Foyt led the race in the early stages, looking to become the first four-time winner of the 500. Near the halfway point, however, a lengthy pit stop to repair a broken manifold put him many laps down. Despite a hard-charging run towards the end, Foyt wound up managing only an eighth-place finish. Lloyd Ruby, a driver with a hard-luck reputation at the Speedway, was leading the race just after the midpoint. During a pit stop on lap 105, he accidentally pulled away with the fueling hose still attached. A hole was ripped in the fuel tank, and Ruby was out of the race. The incident put Mario Andretti in the lead for the rest of the way.

Mario Andretti led 116 laps total and won for car owner Andy Granatelli. Andretti's victory capped off an up-and-down month of May. He entered the month as a favorite, but during practice, he crashed his primary car, a radical four-wheel-drive Lotus. Andretti suffered burns but was able to qualify a back-up car in the middle of the front row. Mario Andretti's 1969 Indy 500 win is the lone victory at the race for the storied Andretti racing family. As of 2026, no Andretti has won the Indianapolis 500 since. Likewise, it was a triumphant first victory for owner Granatelli, after a long presence at Indianapolis - and a long string of disappointments, first with Novis, and then with the Turbines. Andretti, nursing an overheating engine, crossed the finish line about two laps ahead of second place Dan Gurney.

While Foyt and Andretti qualified 1st-2nd, Leon Duray "Jigger" Sirois's pit crew inadvisably waved off his qualifying run on pole day. It would go down in history as one of the most famous gaffes in Indy history.

After five drivers were killed at the Speedway in the decade of the 1960s, the month of May 1969 was relatively clean, with no major injuries. The only injuries for the month were during two practice crashes. Mario Andretti suffered burns to his face, and Sammy Sessions, who suffered a fractured knee cap. Al Unser actually suffered the most serious injury of the month, when he crashed his personal motorcycle in the infield. He suffered a broken leg the night before time trials was to begin, and had to sit out the race. Bud Tingelstad served as his replacement in the Vel's Parnelli Jones Racing entry.

The car in which Andretti won the 1969 Indy 500 is owned by the Smithsonian, while a replica has occasionally been on display at the Indianapolis Motor Speedway Museum.

== Rule changes ==
For 1969, not a single front-engined car managed to qualify for the race, and ultimately, one would never do so again. All 33 cars in the field were rear-engined piston-powered machines. After the famous near-miss failures of the controversial STP Granatelli Turbine machines in 1967 and 1968, USAC imposed additional restrictions that effectively rendered them uncompetitive. The annulus inlet was further reduced from 15.999 in^{2} to 11.999 in^{2}, and the Granatelli team abandoned the project. USAC stopped short of an outright ban on turbine cars, and it was not the last time one would be entered. However, a turbine car would never manage to qualify for the race again.

By 1969, USAC had slowly begun to relax the rules regarding wings. While bolt-on wings were still not allowed, similar devices such as airfoils and spoilers were permitted, as long as they were an integral part of the bodywork. Several cars arrived at the track with a myriad of aerodynamic devices.

Goodyear arrived at the track in 1969 with a new, low-profile, wider tire.

== Race schedule ==
The 1969 race was the most recent Indy 500 scheduled for a Friday; the Uniform Monday Holiday Act was implemented in 1971 and Memorial Day became a three-day holiday weekend (Saturday–Monday) annually. Only one other subsequent year (1973) would the race be scheduled for a weekday. In 1970–1972, the race was scheduled for a Saturday, and beginning in 1974, the race has been scheduled for a Sunday.

Race schedule – May, 1969
Sun	Mon	Tue	Wed	Thu	Fri	Sat
				1 Opening Day	2 Practice	3 Practice
4 Practice	5 Practice	6 Practice	7 Practice	8 Practice	9 Practice	10; Practice
11; Practice	12; Practice	13; Practice	14; Practice	15; Practice	16; Practice	17; Pole Day
18; Time Trials	19; Practice	20; Practice	21; Practice	22; Practice	23; Practice	24; Time Trials
25; Bump Day	26	27	28; Carb Day; Parade	29; Meeting	30; Indy 500	31; Banquet

Color	Notes
Green	Practice
Dark Blue	Time trials
Silver	Race day
Red	Rained out*
Blank	No track activity

* Includes days where track
activity was significantly
limited due to rain

== Practice and time trials ==
The track opened on May 1 to light activity for the first few days. By Tuesday May 6, activity had picked up, and the top drivers were lapping in the 165 mph range. On Wednesday May 7, A. J. Foyt turned a lap of 169.237 mph, establishing himself as the top driver during the first week of practice.

During the second week of practice, Mario Andretti took over the speed chart. On Monday May 12, he ran a lap of 170.197 mph, then followed it up on Wednesday May 14 with a lap of 171.657 mph. Al Unser was close behind with a lap of 169.141 mph.

On Thursday May 15, A. J. Foyt joined the "170 mph" club with a lap of 170.875 mph. By the end of the week, three drivers were over 170. Roger McCluskey posed a 170.283 mph on Friday May 16, the day before time trials was scheduled to begin. Through two weeks, though, no drivers had topped Joe Leonard's track record of 171.959 mph set in 1968.

=== Saturday May 17 – Jigger Sirois ===
Pole day was scheduled for Saturday May 17 from 11 a.m. to 6 p.m. However, rain threatened to wash out the afternoon. At the time, the qualifying rules were a bit unclear and they did not necessarily provide extensions for or lay out provisions in case of a rain delay or a rain stoppage during the pole position round. Only cars that made an attempt before the rains came (and before the track was scheduled to close at 6 o'clock) would be eligible for the pole position. Rookie Leon Duray "Jigger" Sirois drew the #1 spot in the qualifying order.

At 4:12 p.m., the track was dry and finally opened for qualifying. Sirois took to the track for his first qualifying attempt (of three permitted). He completed his first three laps at:

- Lap 1 – 161.783 mph
- Lap 2 – 162.279 mph
- Lap 3 – 160.542 mph

On his fourth and final lap, his pit crew – seemingly dissatisfied with the run thus far – displayed the yellow flag and waved off the run. The qualifying attempt was aborted, and Sirois returned to the pits. At the time, the rules were strict in that once a car received the checkered flag to complete a qualifying attempt, no further attempts were permitted - regardless of how many attempts were left of the allotted three. Arnie Knepper was the second car in line, and pulled away for his warm up laps. Rain began to fall again before Knepper even saw the green flag. The track was then closed for the day.

That evening, Al Unser Sr., who had won the season opener at Phoenix, took to the infield to pass the time during the rain delay. He climbed on his motorcycle, and started riding around with Parnelli Jones. In a small jump over a ditch, he toppled and the kickstand came down and pierced his left leg. He suffered a compound fracture to his left tibia, and was taken to the hospital. Unser was put in a cast, and was sidelined for a month and a half.

=== Sunday May 18 ===
Rain washed out time trials for the second day in a row. It was the first time in modern history that the entire first weekend of time trials was lost due to rain. Pole qualifying was rescheduled for Saturday May 24.

At 1:04 p.m., a few cars make it out on the track for practice, but that lasted for only 18 minutes. Heavy rain and a tornado watch in the area closed the track for the day.

It was quickly noticed by media and fans that had Jigger Sirois' crew not waved off his final lap on Saturday, he would have been the lone qualifier of the weekend and would have sat on the coveted provisional pole position for at least an entire week.

=== Saturday May 24 ===
After 23 days of waiting, and two rainouts, the field was finally ready to begin time trials. On Wednesday May 21, pole favorite Mario Andretti suffered a serious crash in turn four during a practice run. He suffered burns to his face, but no other serious injuries. His four-wheel drive Lotus machine was destroyed, and Andretti would have to qualify a back-up car.

A. J. Foyt won the pole position with a speed of 170.568 mph. A total of 25 cars completed runs. After his practice crash, Mario Andretti qualified the Brawner-Hawk for the middle of row one. Due to his facial burns, Mario asked his twin brother Aldo to stand in for him during the traditional front row photo session.

The news of Foyt winning the pole was relayed to the astronauts on Apollo 10.

=== Sunday May 25 ===
The field was filled to 33 cars with two cars bumped. For the first time in modern history, the field lined up coincidentally by speed from top-to-bottom. In the final hour, Jerry Grant blew his engine during his qualifying attempt. The track was oiled down badly, requiring a lengthy clean-up. After a delay of at least 24 minutes, qualifying resumed with several cars still in line, and time running out.

Jigger Sirois had already waved off his second attempt, then dropped a valve on his third and final attempt. As it ended up, Sirois's first attempt on May 17 would have been fast enough to qualify for the race (ranked 31st) and possibly, depending on interpretation of the rules, win the pole position. Sirois never managed to qualify at Indy in subsequent years, and became a source of popular folklore. After rain affected Pole Day again in 1970, the rules were amended such that all cars would have at least one opportunity to make a qualifying attempt for the pole position, even if Pole Day were to be rained out, delayed or halted for rain, and/or stretched into a second (or third) day.

Al Miller (156.440 mph) completed an attempt in a turbine machine, but was eventually bumped. He was poised to be the second alternate, but was disqualified due to an illegal air intake restrictor plate. At the 6 o'clock gun, Peter Revson bumped out Rick Muther, and the field was set. Bob Veith, who had brushed the wall on his previous qualifying attempt, was the first car left waiting in line.

== Starting grid ==
(W) = Former Indianapolis 500 winner; (R) = Indianapolis 500 rookie

Row	Inside		Middle		Outside	
1	6	(United States) A. J. Foyt W	2	(United States) Mario Andretti	1	(United States) Bobby Unser W
2	66	(United States) Mark Donohue R	12	(United States) Gordon Johncock	82	(United States) Roger McCluskey
3	38	(United States) Jim McElreath	67	(United States) LeeRoy Yarbrough	8	(United States) Gary Bettenhausen
4	48	(United States) Dan Gurney	44	(United States) Joe Leonard	40	(United States) Art Pollard
5	10	(United States) Jim Malloy	59	(United States) Sonny Ates R	84	(United States) George Snider
6	45	(United States) Ronnie Bucknum	36	(United States) Johnny Rutherford	15	(United States) Bud Tingelstad
7	22	(United States) Wally Dallenbach Sr.	4	(United States) Lloyd Ruby	29	(United States) Arnie Knepper
8	90	(United States) Mike Mosley	11	(United States) Sammy Sessions	9	(United States) Mel Kenyon
9	42	(New Zealand) Denny Hulme	98	(United States) Bill Vukovich II	62	(United States) George Follmer R
10	16	(United States) Bruce Walkup R	95	(Australia) Jack Brabham	57	(United States) Carl Williams
11	21	(United States) Larry Dickson	97	(United States) Bobby Johns	92	(United States) Peter Revson R

=== Alternates ===
- First alternate: Rick Muther R (#26)
- Second alternate: none (Al Miller's car was disqualified)

=== Failed to qualify ===
- Al Miller (#51, #71, #72, #75, #96) – Bumped; attempt was later disqualified due to illegal turbine air intake restrictor
- Jigger Sirois R (#14) – Wave off
- Jerry Grant (#17, #69, #78, #96) – Blown engine during qualifying attempt
- Bobby Grim (#16, #71, #89, #94) – Blown engine during qualifying attempt
- Bob Veith (#79, #90) – Hit wall during qualifying attempt
- Jim Hurtubise (#56) – Incomplete qualifying attempt
- Les Scott R (#34, #50, #89) – Wave off

- George Benson R (#89)
- Chuck Booth R (#51)
- Scott Carr R – Withdrew during rookie orientation
- Max Dudley R (#61)
- Cy Fairchild R (#51)
- Charlie Glotzbach R (#52)
- Bob Harkey (#14) – No refresher test
- Graham Hill (#70) – Withdrew
- Dee Jones R (#37, #51)
- Lothar Motschenbacher R
- Pat O'Reilly R (#51) – Driver declined, no license
- Johnny Parsons R
- Sam Posey R (#94)
- Jochen Rindt (#80) – Withdrew, injured
- Dave Strickland R (#34)
- Al Unser (#3, #15) – Withdrew, injured
- Roger West R (#75)
- Denny Zimmerman R (#67, #68)

== Race recap ==
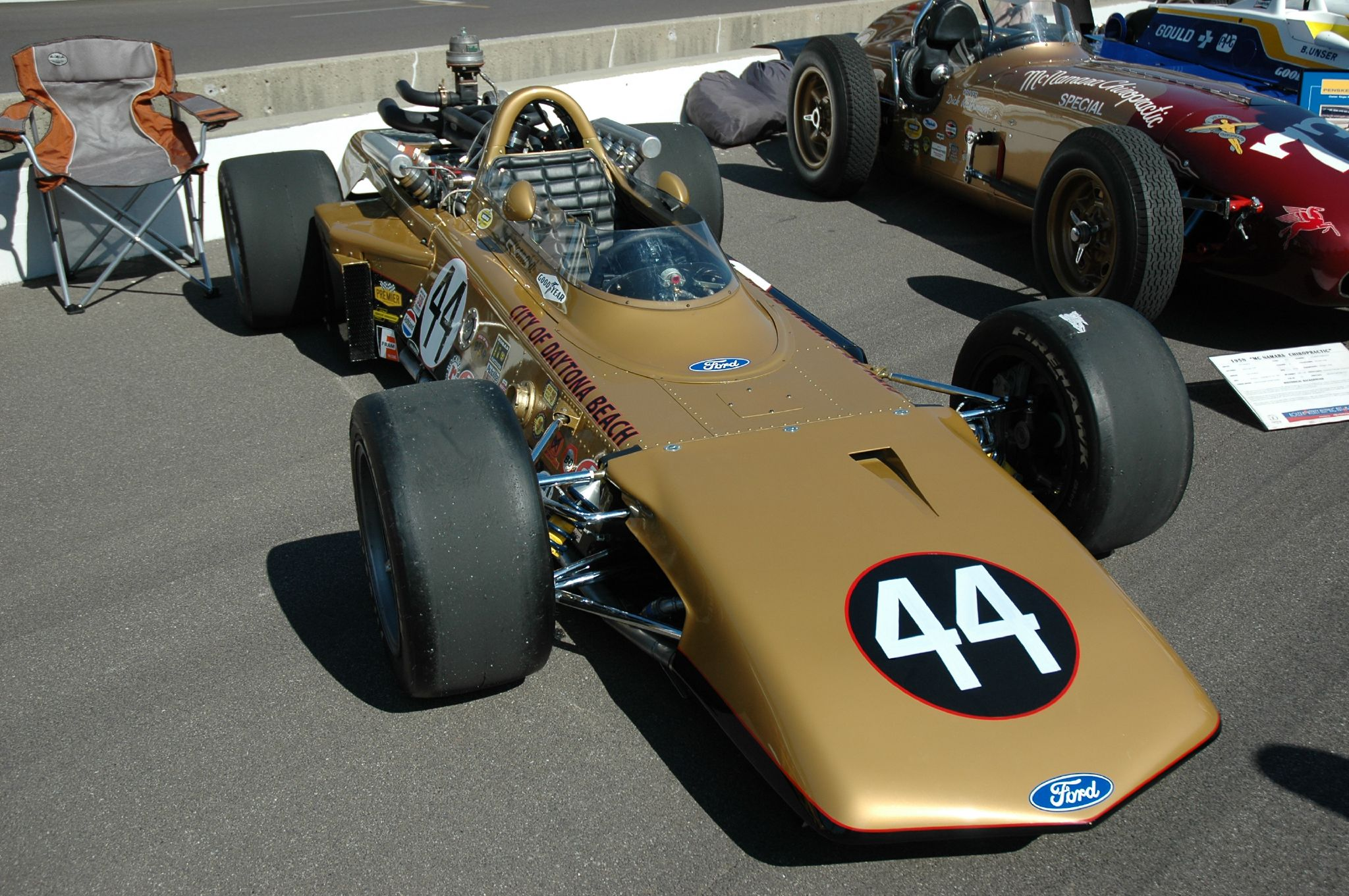
The Eagle driven to 6th place by Joe Leonard

=== Start ===
On the grid, LeeRoy Yarbrough's car failed to start, and the field pulled away, leaving him behind. On the pace lap, Yarbrough was able to get his car cranked, and frantically charged to catch up to the pack. He jockeyed to find his rightful starting position in row three, but managed only to make it mid-pack as the field took the green flag. Going into turn one, Mario Andretti took the lead from the middle of the front row, with polesitter A. J. Foyt following in second. Bruce Walkup, meanwhile, was out on the first lap with a transmission failure.

=== First half ===
Andretti led the first five laps, then Foyt took the lead going into turn one. One of the weaknesses of the turbocharged Fords used by Andretti (and several other top drivers) was overheating. So Andretti eased slightly and Foyt took over. Foyt would lead for 66 laps in the first half. The early stages of the race saw heavy attrition and a series of unscheduled pit stops. Several cars were out before lap 30, including Art Pollard, Ronnie Bucknum, Johnny Rutherford, and Jim McElreath, who had a fire as the car went down into turn one. McElreath was able to stop the car in turn 1 and got out uninjured, bringing out the first of only two yellow light periods. Retiring to the pits early was Gordon Johncock and Bobby Unser, as well as Jack Brabham, whose Repco-Brabham V8 engine would eventually suffer ignition failure.

The second of two yellow light periods came out on lap 87 when Arnie Knepper broke a suspension piece, causing him to crash in turn 4. He hit the outside wall and came to rest near the entrance to the pit area. Wally Dallenbach spun under the yellow and dropped out with a bad clutch.

On lap 99, A. J. Foyt headed to the pits with a split manifold. He spent over twenty minutes in the pits as the team made repairs. However, he did return to the race. With the Foyt team scrambling to diagnose A.J.'s troubles, the team neglected to signal George Snider to the pits, and Snider ran out of fuel on the track. Snider was eventually pushed back to the pits and rejoined the race, but he lost a considerable number of laps.

In the first half, Andy Granatelli's three-car effort was down to one as both Art Pollard and Carl Williams were out early. Mario Andretti was the only Granatelli car still running. After years of disappointment, including the frustrations of the turbines the past two years, Andretti was still in position to finally give Granatelli his first 500 victory.

=== Second half ===
After leading ten laps up to that point, Lloyd Ruby went into the pits on lap 105. As the team was refueling the car, Ruby started to pull away too soon, with the hose still attached. A large hole was ruptured in the side of the fuel tank, and all the fuel spilled out onto the pavement. Ruby was out of the race, leaving Mario Andretti alone in front.

On lap 150, Joe Leonard was black-flagged for leaking fluid. He made a long pit stop to replace a punctured radiator, returned to the race, and managed a 6th-place finish. A. J. Foyt, after returning from repairs, was now among the fastest cars on the track. His hard charging second half saw him finish in 8th place.

Mario Andretti dominated the second half, and won comfortably over second place Dan Gurney. But Andretti's race was not without incident. On one occasion, he nearly hit the wall in turn two. On his final pit stop, he knocked over chief mechanic Clint Brawner, and nearly stalled the engine as he was pushed away. His transmission fluid was low, the clutch was reportedly slipping, and despite an extra radiator added by Brawner behind the driver's seat after qualifying, engine temperature was overheating. Despite the complications, Andretti maintained over a full-lap lead late in the race and cruised to victory.

Car owner Andy Granatelli, who abandoned the turbine cars after the heartbreaks of 1967 and 1968, planted a famous kiss on Andretti's cheek in victory lane. There were no yellow lights during the second half, and the final 110 laps were run under green. Andretti ran the whole race without changing tires.

In victory lane, an emotional happy Mario stated:

"I wanted to win this race so bad that you can't believe it. I will be having to pinch myself for the rest of the night. I am happy for Andy and STP. This is my biggest win and it's awesome."

== Box score ==
The top four racers were allowed to complete the entire 500 mile race distance. Eight additional cars were running as of the race finish, but were flagged off the track not having completed the entire distance. Andretti's race completion time of 3:11:14.71 was the fastest ever as of 1969.

Finish	Start	Car No.	Name	Chassis	Engine	Tires	Qualifying Speed	Laps	Time/Retired
1	2	2	(United States) Mario Andretti	Brawner	Ford V-8	F	169.851	200	156.867 mph
2	10	48	(United States) Dan Gurney	Eagle	Ford-Weslake	G	167.341	200	+2:13.03
3	3	1	(United States) Bobby Unser W	Lola	Offenhauser	G	169.683	200	+3:26.74
4	24	9	(United States) Mel Kenyon	Gerhardt	Offenhauser	G	165.426	200	+5:53.61
5	33	92	(United States) Peter Revson R	Brabham	Repco-Brabham V8	G	160.851	197	Flagged (-3 laps)
6	11	44	(United States) Joe Leonard	Eagle	Ford V-8	G	167.240	193	Flagged (-7 laps)
7	4	66	(United States) Mark Donohue R	Lola	Offenhauser	G	168.903	190	Flagged (-10 laps)
8	1	6	(United States) A. J. Foyt W	Coyote	Ford V-8	G	170.568	181	Flagged (-19 laps)
9	31	21	(United States) Larry Dickson	Vollstedt	Ford V-8	G	163.014	180	Flagged (-20 laps)
10	32	97	(United States) Bobby Johns	Shrike	Offenhauser	F	160.901	171	Flagged (-29 laps)
11	13	10	(United States) Jim Malloy	Vollstedt	Offenhauser	G	167.092	165	Flagged (-35 laps)
12	23	11	(United States) Sammy Sessions	Finley	Offenhauser	G	165.434	163	Flagged (-37 laps)
13	22	90	(United States) Mike Mosley	Eagle	Offenhauser	G	166.113	162	Piston
14	6	82	(United States) Roger McCluskey	Coyote	Ford V-8	G	168.350	157	Split Header
15	18	15	(United States) Bud Tingelstad	Lola	Offenhauser	F	166.597	155	Engine
16	15	84	(United States) George Snider	Coyote	Ford V-8	G	166.914	152	Flagged
17	14	59	(United States) Sonny Ates R	Brabham	Offenhauser	G	166.968	146	Magneto
18	25	42	(New Zealand) Denis Hulme	Eagle	Ford V-8	G	165.092	145	Clutch
19	5	12	(United States) Gordon Johncock	Gerhardt	Offenhauser	G	168.626	137	Piston
20	20	4	(United States) Lloyd Ruby	Mongoose	Offenhauser	F	166.428	105	Fuel Tank
21	19	22	(United States) Wally Dallenbach Sr.	Eagle	Offenhauser	G	166.497	82	Clutch
22	21	29	(United States) Arnie Knepper	Cecil	Ford V-8	G	166.220	82	Crash T4
23	8	67	(United States) LeeRoy Yarbrough	Vollstedt	Ford V-8	G	168.075	65	Split Header
24	29	95	(Australia) Jack Brabham	Brabham	Repco-Brabham V8	G	163.875	58	Ignition
25	30	57	(United States) Carl Williams	Gerhardt	Offenhauser	F	163.265	50	Clutch
26	9	8	(United States) Gary Bettenhausen	Gerhardt	Offenhauser	G	167.777	35	Piston
27	27	62	(United States) George Follmer R	Gilbert	Ford V-8	F	164.286	26	Engine
28	7	38	(United States) Jim McElreath	Brawner	Offenhauser	G	168.224	24	Engine Fire
29	17	36	(United States) Johnny Rutherford	Eagle	Offenhauser	G	166.628	24	Oil Tank
30	16	45	(United States) Ronnie Bucknum	Eagle	Offenhauser	G	166.636	16	Piston
31	12	40	(United States) Art Pollard	Lotus	Offenhauser	F	167.123	7	Drive Line
32	26	98	(United States) Bill Vukovich II	Mongoose	Offenhauser	F	164.843	1	Rod
33	28	16	(United States) Bruce Walkup R	Gerhardt	Offenhauser	G	163.942	0	Transmission

W Former Indianapolis 500 winner

R Indianapolis 500 Rookie

=== Race statistics ===
Lap Leaders
Laps	Leader
1–5	Mario Andretti
6–51	A. J. Foyt
52–58	Wally Dallenbach
59–78	A. J. Foyt
79–86	Lloyd Ruby
87–102	Mario Andretti
103–105	Lloyd Ruby
106–200	Mario Andretti

Total laps led
Driver	Laps
Mario Andretti	116
A. J. Foyt	66
Lloyd Ruby	11
Wally Dallenbach	7

Yellow Lights: 2 for 14 minutes
Laps*	Reason
26–31	Jim McElreath engine fire in turn 1 (8 minutes)
88–93	Arnie Knepper crash (6 minutes)
* – Approximate lap counts

Tire participation chart
Supplier	No. of starters
Goodyear	25
Firestone	8*
* – Denotes race winner

== Broadcasting ==
=== Radio ===
The race was carried live on the IMS Radio Network. Sid Collins served as chief announcer and Len Sutton served as "driver expert." At the conclusion of the race, Lou Palmer reported from victory lane. The broadcast came on-air with a 30-minute pre-race.

The broadcast was carried on over 950 affiliates, including AFN, shortwave to troops in Vietnam, and the CBC. Foreign language translations were made in French, Italian, Spanish, and Portuguese. The broadcast was also carried in Mexico City on XEVIB. The broadcast reached an estimated 100 million listeners.

Among the many visitors to the booth were O. J. Simpson, Oscar Robertson, Earl McCullouch, Irv Fried (Langhorne), Wally Parks, Dale Drake, Sam Hanks, and Duke Nalon. For the second year in a row, Senator Birch Bayh visited the booth, along with his teenage son, future senator Evan Bayh who also for the second year in a row correctly predicted the winner of the race (Mario Andretti). Later in the race, Senator Vance Hartke also visited, accompanied by Secretary of Transportation John A. Volpe.

Indianapolis Motor Speedway Radio Network
Booth Announcers	Turn Reporters	Pit/garage reporters
Chief Announcer: Sid Collins; Driver expert: Len Sutton; Statistician: John DeCamp; Historian: Donald Davidson	Turn 1: Mike Ahern; Turn 2: Howdy Bell; Backstretch: Doug Zink; Turn 3: Ron Carrell; Turn 4: Jim Shelton	Chuck Marlowe (north pits); Luke Walton (center pits); Lou Palmer (south pits)

=== Television ===
The race was carried in the United States on ABC's Wide World of Sports. The broadcast aired on Saturday, June 7. Jim McKay anchored the broadcast with Rodger Ward as analyst and Chris Economaki as pit reporter.

The telecast featured a summary of time trials as well as pre-race interviews. During the race, McKay and Economaki served as roving pit reporters, and their interviews were edited into the final production.

The broadcast has re-aired on ESPN Classic starting in May 2011.

For the fifth year, a live telecast of the race was shown in theaters on a closed-circuit basis; once more, Charlie Brockman called the action.

ABC Television
Booth Announcers	Pit/garage reporters
Announcer: Jim McKay; Color: Rodger Ward	Chris Economaki

== Gallery ==
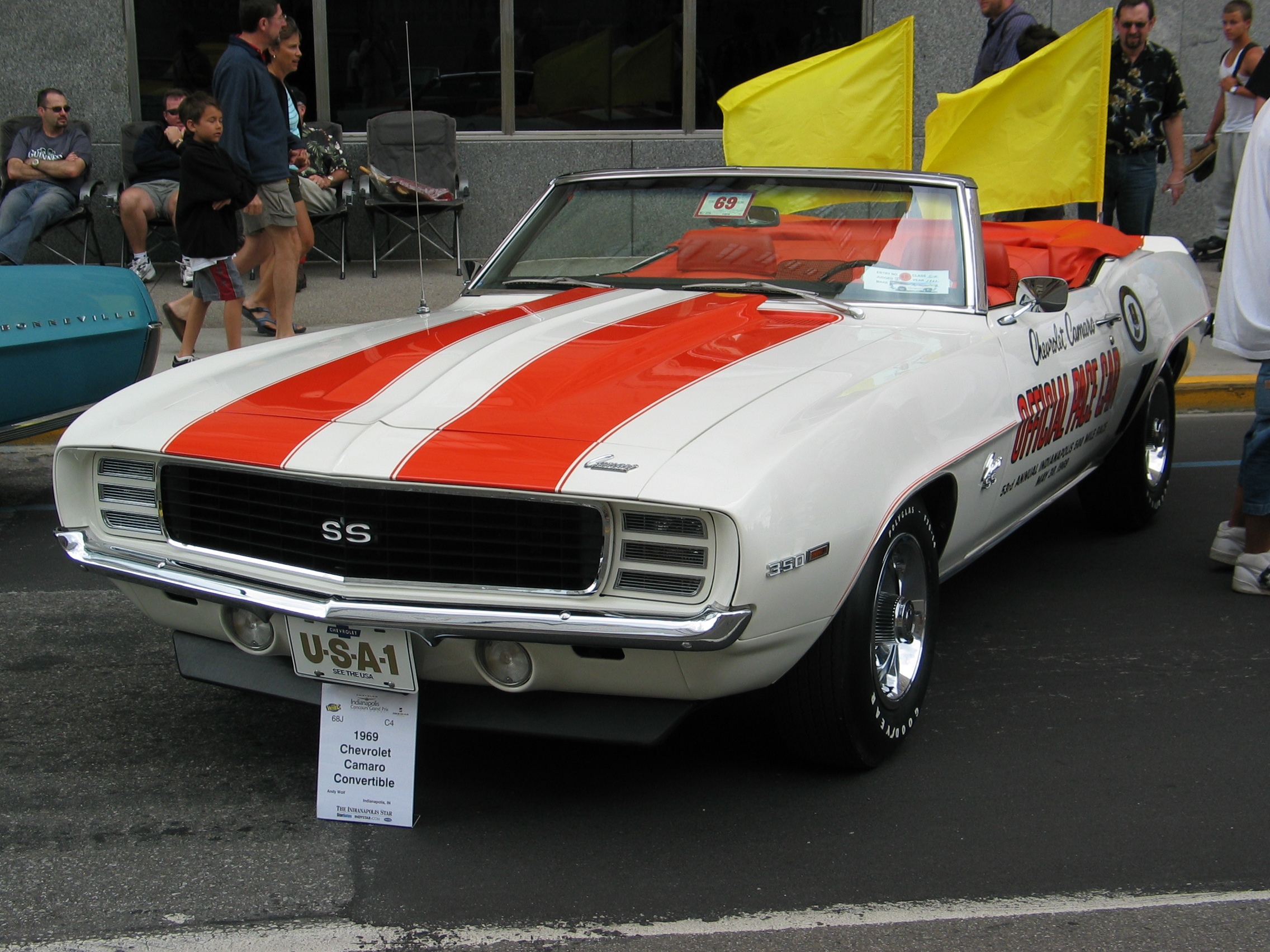
1969 Camaro pace car replica

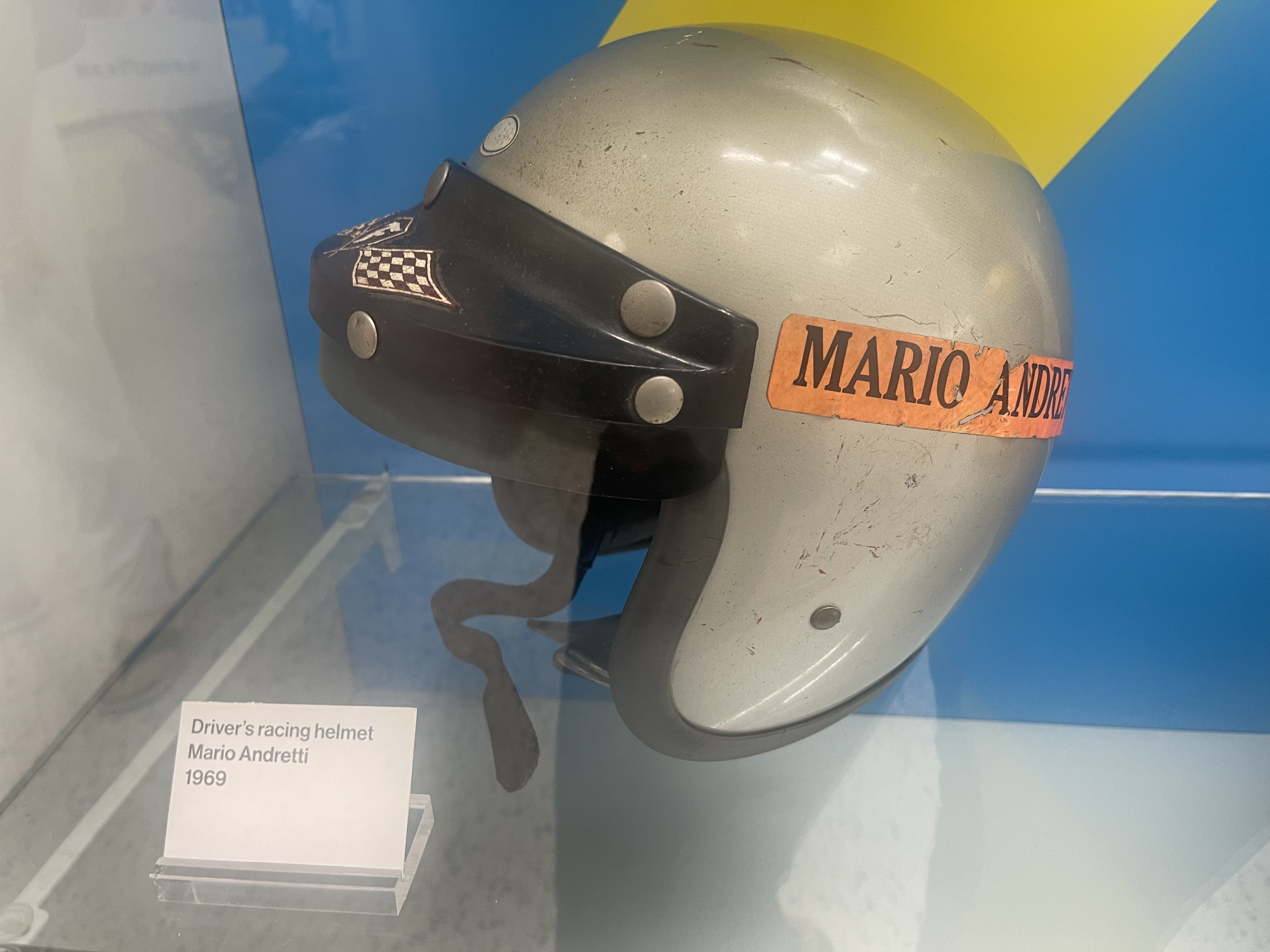
Mario Andretti's helmet he wore at the race on display at the Indianapolis Motor Speedway Museum.

== Notes ==
=== Works cited ===
- 1969 Indianapolis 500 Press Information - Daily Trackside Summary
- Indianapolis 500 History: Race & All-Time Stats - Official Site
- 1969 Indianapolis 500 Radio Broadcast, Indianapolis Motor Speedway Radio Network

1968 Indianapolis 500; Bobby Unser	1969 Indianapolis 500; Mario Andretti	1970 Indianapolis 500; Al Unser
Preceded by 152.882 mph (1968 Indianapolis 500)	Record for the fastest average speed 156.867 mph	Succeeded by 157.735 mph (1971 Indianapolis 500)
