= 1968 Indianapolis 500 =

American motor race

52nd Indianapolis 500
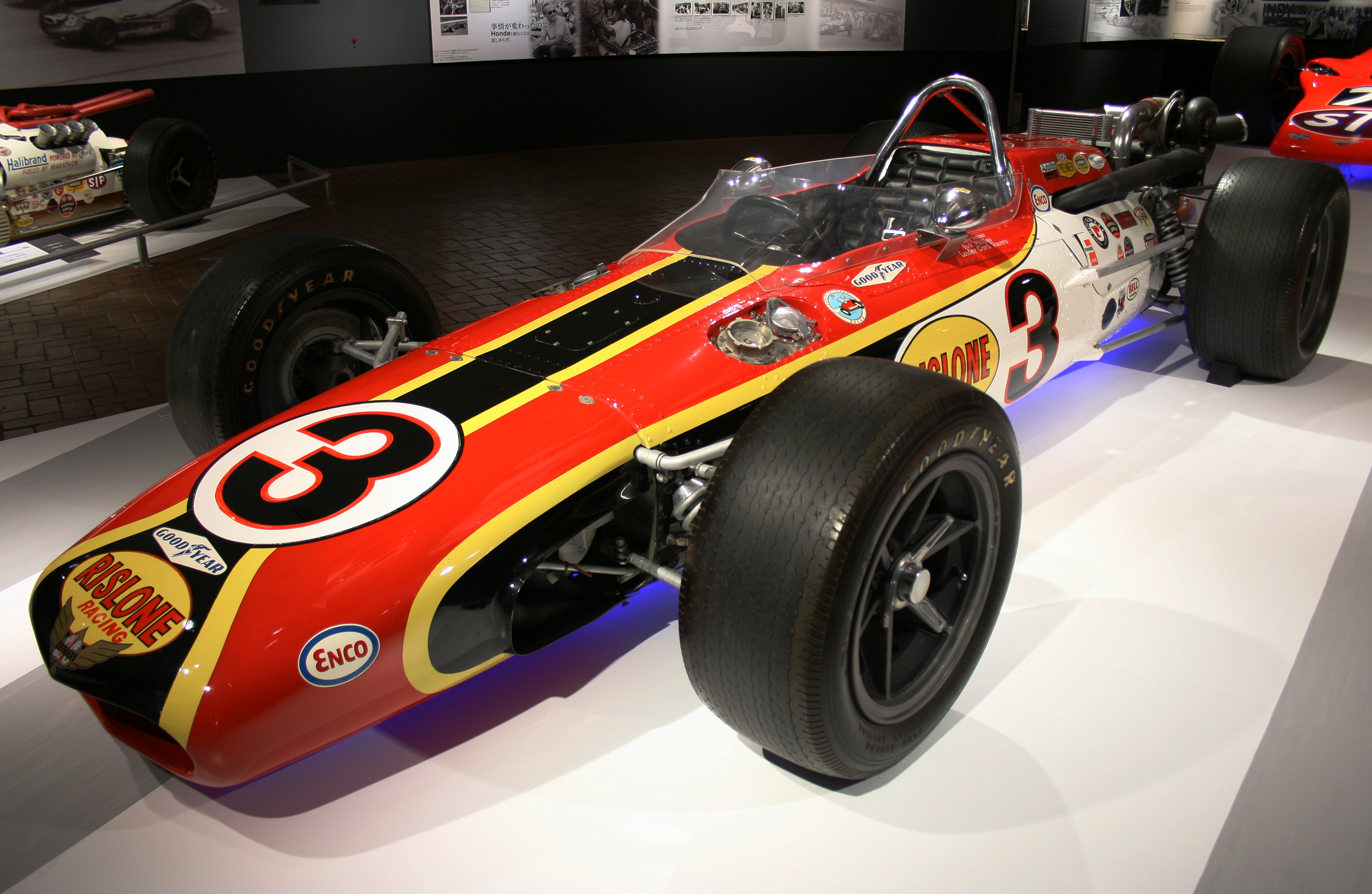

Indianapolis Motor Speedway

Indianapolis 500
- Sanctioning body: USAC
- Season: 1968 USAC season
- Date: May 30, 1968
- Winner: Bobby Unser
- Winning team: Leader Card Racers
- Winning Chief Mechanic: Jud Phillips
- Time of race: 3:16:13.76
- Average speed: 152.882 mph (246.040 km/h)
- Pole position: Joe Leonard
- Pole speed: 171.559 mph (276.097 km/h)
- Fastest qualifier: Joe Leonard
- Rookie of the Year: Bill Vukovich II
- Most laps led: Bobby Unser (127)

Pre-race ceremonies
- National anthem: Purdue Band
- "Back Home Again in Indiana": Richard O. Plothow
- Starting command: Tony Hulman
- Pace car: Ford Torino GT
- Pace car driver: William Clay Ford Sr.
- Starter: Pat Vidan
- Estimated attendance: 300,000

Television in the United States
- Network: ABC's Wide World of Sports
- Announcers: Jim McKay, Rodger Ward

Chronology
Previous	Next
1967	1969

The 52nd International 500 Mile Sweepstakes was held at the Indianapolis Motor Speedway in Speedway, Indiana on Thursday May 30, 1968. Bobby Unser won the first of his three Indy 500 victories (1968, 1975, 1981). This was the final Indianapolis 500 to feature a front-engined car in the starting field. Of the 33 cars, 32 were rear-engined machines (including three turbines). Jim Hurtubise's entry, which dropped out after only nine laps, was the last front-engine car to race in the 500. This was also the first 500 won by a turbocharged engine.

For the second year in a row, one of Andy Granatelli's STP Turbine-powered machines was leading late in the race, but once again, it failed within sight of victory. On lap 174, Lloyd Ruby's engine misfired allowing Joe Leonard to take the lead in the Lotus 56 Turbine. Leonard, however, suffered a flameout on the lap 191 restart, and rolled to a silent and shocking halt. Unser, in the venerable piston-powered Offenhauser, inherited the lead and won the race despite gear linkage trouble.

During the month, film crews were on hand to film various action shots and stock footage of the race proceedings to be used in the 1969 film Winning, starring Paul Newman.

With 9.25 inches (23.5 cm) of precipitation in the Indianapolis area in May, the 1968 race featured the wettest month on record for the Indy 500. Rain hampered practice and qualifying, but did not affect race day. This was the most recent Indy 500 scheduled for Thursday; the Uniform Monday Holiday Act was implemented in 1971 and Memorial Day became a three-day weekend (Saturday–Monday) every year. A day previously avoided, Sunday became the scheduled race day beginning in 1974.

== Race schedule ==
Time trials was scheduled for four days, but for the first time under the current schedule format, qualifying was carried over into a fifth day. Most of Bump Day (May 26) was rained out, and the track closed due to darkness with the field not yet filled to 33 cars. A special session was held Monday in order to complete the field.

Race schedule — May 1968
Sun	Mon	Tue	Wed	Thu	Fri	Sat
			1 Practice	2 Practice	3 Practice	4 Practice
5 Practice	6 Practice	7 Practice	8 Practice	9 Practice	10; Practice	11; Practice
12; Practice	13; Practice	14; Practice	15; Practice	16; Practice	17; Practice	18; Pole Day
19; Time Trials	20; Practice	21; Practice	22; Practice	23; Practice	24; Practice	25; Time Trials
26; Bump Day	27; Time Trials	28; Carb Day; Parade	29; Meeting	30; Indy 500	31; Banquet	

Color	Notes
Green	Practice
Dark Blue	Time trials
Silver	Race day
Red	Rained out*
Blank	No track activity

* Includes days where track
activity was significantly
limited due to rain

- The 500 Festival Parade was held Tuesday night, May 28.

== Practice and time trials ==
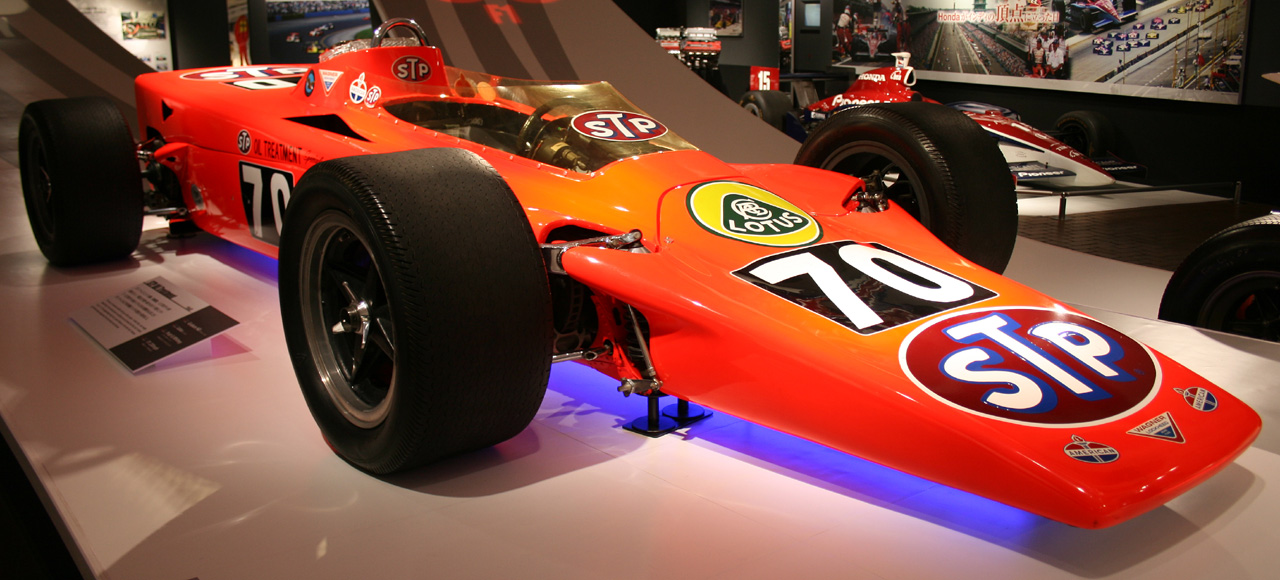
Graham Hill's 1968 Lotus 56 Turbine

The 1968 Indianapolis 500 was the second and ultimately the final year of participation by the controversial STP Granatelli Turbine machines. For 1968, the Pratt & Whitney turbine engine was installed in the Lotus 56 chassis, often known colloquially as the "Wedge Turbine," and sometimes affectionately as the "Doorstop." In a veiled effort to curtail the turbine's power output, USAC had imposed revised regulations regarding the maximum annulus inlet (reduced from 23.999 in^{2} to 15.999 in^{2}).

Another rule change dictated that cars were required to conduct three mandatory pit stops, up from two that were required from 1965 to 1967.

Mike Spence was fatally injured after a crash in turn one on May 7. A tire broke off his Lotus "Wedge" Turbine and struck him in the head. He died of his injuries a few hours after the accident after being taken to the hospital. Spence's death came one month after Jim Clark's fatal accident at Hockenheim. Clark was scheduled to drive one of the Lotus Wedge Turbines at Indy, and had tested one of the machines just prior to his death.

=== Pole Day Time trials – Saturday May 18 ===
Graham Hill, the 1966 winner, in the #70 STP Turbine, was first to qualify and set a new qualifying record. Later, his STP Lotus 56 teammate Joe Leonard in #60 won the pole position with a four-lap average speed of 171.559 mph (276.1 km/h). Despite the expected dominance of the Turbines, Bobby Unser put his turbocharged Offenhauser on the outside of the front row at a noteworthy 169.507 mph.

=== Second Day time trials – Sunday May 19 ===
Rain kept cars off the track most of the day. Only two cars were able to make an attempt, and only one was run to completion. At 5:45 p.m., the track was finally opened for qualifications, and Jochen Rindt was the lone qualifier at 164.144 mph (264.2 km/h), while Denny Hulme waved off as the 6 o'clock gun went off.

At the conclusion of the first weekend of time trials, the field was filled to 16 cars.

=== Third Day time trials – Saturday May 25 ===
Sixteen cars made a total of 24 attempts, and filled the field to 26 cars. High winds kept some cars off the track, and speeds were down from the previous weekend. Many cars waved off, and Mel Kenyon, at 165.191 mph (265.8 km/h), was the fastest of the day.

After qualifying, Ronnie Bucknum's car was disqualified for being twenty pounds (9 kg) underweight.

=== Fourth day time trials – Sunday May 26 ===
With the field filled to 25 cars (eight spots open), rain kept the cars off the track until late in the day. The final scheduled day of time trials ("Bump Day") was almost a complete wash out. The traditional 6 o'clock closing time came and went, and the track was still wet. Track crews continued to work, and the track opened for practice at 6:55 p.m. After the mandatory 30-minute practice session, the track opened for time trials at 7:31 p.m.

With overcast skies and darkness looming, three cars made attempts. Bill Puterbaugh and Bill Cheesbourg completed runs, while Bobby Johns spun on his second warm up lap. At that time, officials deemed the conditions unsafe due to darkness, and postponed the remainder of qualifying until Monday morning.

=== Time trials – Monday May 27 ===
For the first time since 1952, time trials were pushed into a fifth day. Officials ruled that all 25 cars that were in the starting field at 6 p.m. Sunday (May 26) were "locked in" and could not be bumped. In addition, all cars that were in line to qualify Sunday evening at 7:54 p.m. were eligible to make one qualifying attempt on Monday. Only cars that qualified after 6 p.m. on Sunday evening were subject to bumping (including Puterbaugh and Cheesbourg).

Ronnie Bucknum was reinstated to the field when it was determined that during his inspection, the scale used to weight the car was defective. With Bucknum's car back in the field, only seven spots were now available.

Though rain hampered the day, the qualifying was successfully completed on Monday. A frantic session saw two crashes (Bob Hurt and Rick Muther). Eighteen cars took to the track to fill the seven open spots. Both Puterbaugh and Cheesebourg were bumped, and Mike Mosley was the fastest of the day. Jim Hurtubise qualified his front-engined Mallard for 30th starting position. It would be the final front-engined car to qualify for the Indy 500.

== Qualification Chronology ==
Att #	Car #	Driver	Laps	Qual Speed	Rank	Start	Comment
Saturday May 18, 1968
1	70	Graham Hill	4	171.208	2	2	
2	25	Lloyd Ruby	4	167.613	5	5	
3	8	Roger McCluskey	4	166.976	7	7	
4	15	Mel Kenyon	2	—	—	—	Waved off
5	54	Wally Dallenbach	3	—	—	—	Waved off
6	3	Bobby Unser	4	169.507	3	3	
7	4	Gordon Johncock	3	—	—	—	Waved off
8	1	A. J. Foyt	4	166.821	8	8	
9	48	Dan Gurney	4	166.512	10	10	
10	27	Jim Malloy	4	165.032	15	14	
11	60	Joe Leonard	4	171.559	1	1	
12	4	Gordon Johncock	4	166.775	9	9	
13	82	Jim McElreath	4	165.512	13	13	
14	24	Al Unser	4	167.069	6	6	
15	2	Mario Andretti	4	167.691	4	4	
16	54	Wally Dallenbach	4	165.548	12	12	
17	56	Jim Hurtubise	1	—	—	—	Accident
18	78	Jerry Grant	4	164.782	16	15	
19	20	Art Pollard	4	166.297	11	11	
Sunday May 19, 1968
20	35	Jochen Rindt	4	164.144	20	16	
21	42	Denis Hulme	3	—	—	—	Waved off
Saturday May 25, 1968
22	21	Arnie Knepper	1	—	—	—	Accident
23	15	Mel Kenyon	3	—	—	—	Waved off
24	62	Bruce Walkup	3	—	—	—	
25	11	Gary Bettenhausen	4	163.562	22	22	
26	18	Johnny Rutherford	4	163.830	21	21	
27	45	Ronnie Bucknum	4	164.211	18	19	Disqualified 5/25; Reinstated 5/27; Bumps #88
28	88	Bob Harkey	3	—	—	—	Waved off
29	36	Larry Dickson	3	—	—	—	Waved off
30	59	Ronnie Duman	4	162.338	27	26	
31	98	Billy Vukovich II	4	163.510	23	23	
32	26	Bobby Johns	3	—	—	—	Waved off
33	14	Bob Hurt	3	—	—	—	Waved off
34	16	Bob Veith	4	163.495	24	24	
35	10	Bud Tingelstad	1	—	—	—	Pulled off
36	90	Mike Mosley	2	—	—	—	Waved off
37	6	Bobby Grim	4	162.866	25	25	
38	84	Carl Williams	2	—	—	—	Waved off
39	26	Bobby Johns	3	—	—	—	Waved off
40	10	Bud Tingelstad	4	164.444	17	18	
41	21	Arnie Knepper	3	—	—	—	Waved off
42	42	Denis Hulme	4	164.189	19	20	
43	15	Mel Kenyon	4	165.191	14	17	
44	84	Carl Williams	3	—	—	—	Waved off
45	36	Larry Dickson	3	—	—	—	Waved off
Sunday May 26, 1968
46	77	Bill Puterbaugh	4	157.301	—	—	Bumped by #84
47	22	Bill Cheesbourg	4	157.274	—	—	Bumped by #21
		Bobby Johns		157.274	—	—	Spun on second warm up lap
Monday May 27, 1968
48	88	Bob Harkey	4	159.915	—	—	Bumped by #45 reinstatement
49	90	Mike Mosley	4	162.449	26	27	
50	41	George Follmer	4	158.877	—	—	Bumped by #62
51	28	Rick Muther	2	—	—	—	Accident
52	94	Sam Sessions	4	162.118	31	31	
53	31	Sonny Ates	4	158.221	—	—	Bumped by #29
54	36	Larry Dickson	4	159.652	—	—	Bumped by #56
55	21	Arnie Knepper	4	161.900	32	32	Bumps #22
56	84	Carl Williams	4	162.232	29	29	Bumps #77
57	29	George Snider	4	162.264	28	28	Bumps #31
58	62	Bruce Walkup	4	160.514	—	—	Bumps #41; Bumped by #64
59	56	Jim Hurtubise	4	162.191	30	30	Bumps #36
60	32	Al Miller II	4	157.109	—	—	Too slow
61	71	Bob Harkey	4	156.257	—	—	Too slow
62	64	Larry Dickson	4	161.124	33	33	Bumps #88
63	76	Jerry Titus	4	154.540	—	—	Too slow

== Starting grid ==
Row	Inside		Middle		Outside	
1	60	(United States) Joe Leonard	70	(United Kingdom) Graham Hill W	3	(United States) Bobby Unser
2	2	(United States) Mario Andretti	25	(United States) Lloyd Ruby	24	(United States) Al Unser
3	8	(United States) Roger McCluskey	1	(United States) A. J. Foyt W	4	(United States) Gordon Johncock
4	48	(United States) Dan Gurney	20	(United States) Art Pollard	54	(United States) Wally Dallenbach Sr.
5	82	(United States) Jim McElreath	27	(United States) Jim Malloy R	78	(United States) Jerry Grant
6	35	(Austria) Jochen Rindt	15	(United States) Mel Kenyon	10	(United States) Bud Tingelstad
7	45	(United States) Ronnie Bucknum R	42	(New Zealand) Denny Hulme	18	(United States) Johnny Rutherford
8	11	(United States) Gary Bettenhausen R	98	(United States) Bill Vukovich II R	16	(United States) Bob Veith
9	6	(United States) Bobby Grim	59	(United States) Ronnie Duman	90	(United States) Mike Mosley R
10	84	(United States) Carl Williams	29	(United States) George Snider	56	(United States) Jim Hurtubise
11	94	(United States) Sammy Sessions R	21	(United States) Arnie Knepper	64	(United States) Larry Dickson

R Indianapolis 500 rookie
W Indianapolis 500 winner

=== Alternates ===
- First alternate: Bruce Walkup R (#59, #62)

=== Failed to qualify ===
- Otto Becker (#46) - Entry Declined
- Sonny Ates R (#19, #31)
- Rollie Beale R (#32, #88)
- Chuck Booth (#34) – Entered, did not drive
- Bill Cheesbourg (#22, #75, #81)
- Jim Clark – Withdrawn after his death on April 7
- George Follmer R (#28, #41, #42)
- Masten Gregory (#28, #95)
- Bob Harkey (#71, #77, #88)
- Chuck Hulse (#90) – Wrecked practice, retired
- Bob Hurt R (#11, #14, #36, #72, #81, #90)
- Bobby Johns (#17, #25)
- Dee Jones R (#34, #46)
- Ralph Ligouri R (#71, #77, #88)
- Bruce McLaren R (#66, #69)
- Al Miller (#9, #32)
- Rick Muther R (#22, #28)
- Danny Ongais R (#63) – Entry declined, lack of experience
- Henry Pens R (#17) – Entry declined, lack of experience
- Bill Puterbaugh R (#63, #71, #77)
- Les Scott R (#50) – Failed refresher test
- Mike Spence R (#30, #60) – Fatal accident
- Chuck Stevenson (#90) – Wrecked, retired
- Jackie Stewart (#20)
- Jerry Titus R (#50, #71, #75, #76)
- Greg Weld R (#17, #19, #30)
- Dempsey Wilson (#51, #63, #81)
- LeeRoy Yarbrough (#59, #62)

== Race Day ==
=== First half ===
At the drop of the green flag, Joe Leonard in the #60 STP Turbine took the lead, with Bobby Unser in second and Roger McCluskey up to third at the end of lap one. A fast pace was set over the first 100 miles, with no yellow caution lights. Bobby Unser took the lead for the first time on lap 8, and led most of the first half.

After only nine laps, Jim Hurtubise in the front-engined PepsiCo Frito-lay special had burned a piston, and was out, finishing 30th, the final front-engined "roadster" to race at lap at the 500. Also in the pits was Mario Andretti, who dropped out with a bad piston. Moments later, he hopped into the car of his teammate Larry Dickson, but that was also short-lived. That car also suffered a broken piston after 24 laps.

On lap 41, the caution flag flew for the first time. Al Unser Sr. made a routine pit stop, but a fire broke out in the turbocharger. He was able to return to the race, but after only one lap, he lost a wheel and hit the wall in turn one. Arnie Knepper and Gary Bettenhausen were also involved. After 200 miles (320 km), defending champion A. J. Foyt was out with a blown engine.

=== Second half ===
On lap 110, Graham Hill lost a wheel and smashed into the turn two wall, which brought out the second caution. It was the first of the three Granatelli Turbines to drop out of the race. On the restart, Bobby Unser took the lead, blowing by Joe Leonard, showing the traditional piston-powered engines were still a match for the powerful turbines.

On lap 127, Mel Kenyon and rookie Billy Vukovich II tangled in turn four. Both were able to re-enter the race, but Johnny Rutherford, while trying to slow down, was rear-ended by Jim McElreath. Mike Mosley also spun into the turn four grass trying to avoid the accident. Rutherford was out, but McElreath limped back to the pits where his crew repaired the nosecone.

When Bobby Unser made his last pit stop on lap 166, his gearshift linkage was broken, and the car was stuck in high gear. As he slowly left his pit, struggling to accelerate back to racing speed, both Leonard and Ruby passed him. Leonard now led in the Turbine. Ruby was up to second, but moments later on lap 178, Ruby was back in the pits with a faulty ignition coil. His crew was able to replace the coil, but the six-minute pit stop dropped him out of contention for the win.

With 19 laps to go, Joe Leonard led, with Bobby Unser back up to second. Carl Williams crashed on the backstretch, triggering a fire which brought out the yellow light. Under the caution, Leonard led, with Bobby Unser second, and Dan Gurney in third. For a brief moment, a controversy started brewing as Art Pollard (teammate to Joe Leonard), who was a couple laps down, was not keeping up with the caution pace. As a result, Bobby Unser was stuck behind him, and losing track position to Leonard.

=== Finish ===
After the cleanup, the green flag was given to the field at the start of lap 192. At that instant, both leader Joe Leonard and his teammate Art Pollard hesitated and instantly slowed with identical snapped fuel pump drive shafts. The turbine engines again failed in sight of the finish, stunning the racing fraternity. Bobby Unser swept by into the lead with Dan Gurney inheriting second place. With a nearly full-lap lead, Unser cruised over the final nine laps to win his first Indianapolis 500.

Cars using Goodyear tires swept the top four positions, and Goodyear won their second 500 in row. Officials allowed the top five cars to finish the full 500 miles, then flagged the rest of the field off the track. This would be the final 500 in which finishers were named to the prestigious Champion Spark Plug 100 mph Club. Unlike the 1967 race, the Turbine did not run away from the field in 1968. Bobby Unser led the most laps in the Offenhauser, but Joe Leonard spent most of the day on Unser's tail, in the top three. Graham Hill ran in the top five, but complained that he lacked speed down the long straights, and was running 4th when he wrecked. Art Pollard, in the third Turbine, spent most of the day in the top ten before the car quit, but was never really a factor for the win.

== Box score ==
Finish	Start	No	Name	Chassis	Engine	Tire	Qual	Laps	Status
1	3	3	(United States) Bobby Unser	Eagle	Offenhauser	G	169.507	200	152.882 mph
2	10	48	(United States) Dan Gurney	Eagle	Ford-Weslake	G	166.512	200	+53.80
3	17	15	(United States) Mel Kenyon	Gerhardt	Offenhauser	G	165.191	200	+4:48.62
4	20	42	(New Zealand) Denis Hulme	Eagle	Ford	G	164.189	200	+4:55.41
5	5	25	(United States) Lloyd Ruby	Mongoose	Offenhauser	F	167.613	200	+5:45.06
6	26	59	(United States) Ronnie Duman	Brabham	Offenhauser	G	162.338	200	Running
7	23	98	(United States) Bill Vukovich II R	Shrike	Offenhauser	F	163.510	198	Flagged
8	27	90	(United States) Mike Mosley R	Watson	Offenhauser	G	162.499	197	Flagged
9	31	94	(United States) Sammy Sessions R	Finley	Offenhauser	G	162.118	197	Flagged
10	25	6	(United States) Bobby Grim	Mongoose	Offenhauser	F	162.866	196	Flagged
11	24	16	(United States) Bob Veith	Gerhardt	Offenhauser	G	163.495	196	Flagged
12	1	60	(United States) Joe Leonard	Lotus	Pratt & Whitney	F	171.599	191	Fuel Shaft
13	11	20	(United States) Art Pollard	Lotus	Pratt & Whitney	F	166.297	188	Fuel Shaft
14	13	82	(United States) Jim McElreath	Coyote	Ford	G	165.327	179	Stalled
15	28	84	(United States) Carl Williams	Coyote	Ford	G	162.323	163	Crash BS
16	18	10	(United States) Bud Tingelstad	Gerhardt	Ford	G	164.444	158	Oil Pressure
17	12	54	(United States) Wally Dallenbach Sr.	Finley	Offenhauser	G	165.548	148	Engine
18	21	18	(United States) Johnny Rutherford	Eagle	Ford	G	163.830	125	Crash T4
19	2	70	(United Kingdom) Graham Hill W	Lotus	Pratt & Whitney	F	171.208	110	Crash T2
20	8	1	(United States) A. J. Foyt W	Coyote	Ford	G	166.821	86	Rear End
21	19	45	(United States) Ronnie Bucknum R	Eagle	Ford	G	164.211	76	Fuel Leak
22	14	27	(United States) Jim Malloy R	Vollstedt	Ford	F	165.032	64	Rear End
23	15	78	(United States) Jerry Grant	Eagle	Ford	G	164.782	50	Oil Leak
24	22	11	(United States) Gary Bettenhausen R	Gerhardt	Offenhauser	F	163.562	43	Accident T1
25	32	21	(United States) Arnie Knepper	Vollstedt	Ford	F	161.900	42	Accident T1
26	6	24	(United States) Al Unser	Lola	Ford	F	167.069	40	Crash T1
27	9	4	(United States) Gordon Johncock	Gerhardt	Offenhauser	G	166.775	37	Rear End
28	33	64	(United States) Larry Dickson (Mario Andretti Laps 14–24)	Brawner	Ford	F	161.124	24	Piston
29	7	8	(United States) Roger McCluskey	Eagle	Offenhauser	G	166.976	16	Oil Filter
30	30	56	(United States) Jim Hurtubise	Mallard	Offenhauser	F	162.191	9	Piston
31	29	29	(United States) George Snider	Mongoose	Ford	F	162.264	9	Oil Leak
32	16	35	(Austria) Jochen Rindt	Brabham	Repco-Brabham	G	164.144	5	Piston
33	4	2	(United States) Mario Andretti	Brawner	Ford	F	167.691	2	Piston

Note: Relief drivers in parentheses

W Former Indianapolis 500 winner

R Indianapolis 500 Rookie

=== Race statistics ===
Lap Leaders
Laps	Leader
1–7	Joe Leonard
8–56	Bobby Unser
57–89	Lloyd Ruby
90–112	Bobby Unser
113–119	Joe Leonard
120–165	Bobby Unser
166–174	Lloyd Ruby
175–191	Joe Leonard
192–200	Bobby Unser

Total laps led
Driver	Laps
Bobby Unser	127
Lloyd Ruby	42
Joe Leonard	31

Yellow Lights: 5 for 47 minutes
Laps*	Reason
41–51	Al Unser crash in turn 1 (12 minutes)
110–119	Graham Hill crash in turn 2 (10 minutes)
127–138	Vukovich brushed wall in turn 3 (12 minutes); Rutherford/Mosely spun in turn 4
158	Debris on frontstretch (1 minute)
183–191	Carl Williams crash in turn 2 (12 minutes)
* – Approximate lap counts

Tire participation chart
Supplier	No. of starters
Goodyear	19*
Firestone	14
* – Denotes race winner

== Race notes ==
- This was the fourth consecutive race victory for Bobby Unser in the 1968 season, he would go on the claim the National Championship.
- This would be the final Indy 500 documented by the popular Floyd Clymer 500 Mile Race yearbooks.
- 6th-place finisher Ronnie Duman would be killed ten days later at Milwaukee.
- Mike Spence was the third person with the surname of Spence (none of whom were related) to lose his life at the Speedway.

== Broadcasting ==
=== Radio ===
The race was carried live on the IMS Radio Network. Sid Collins served as chief announcer. Len Sutton served as "driver expert" for the third year. At the conclusion of the race, Lou Palmer reported from victory lane.

Pre-race coverage was 30 minutes. The entire on-air crew remained consistent from 1966 & 1967. The broadcast was carried by over 900 affiliates including 761 in the United States, Armed Forces Network, the CBC, and reached New Zealand and Australia for the first time. The broadcast had an estimated 100 million listeners worldwide.

Collins greeted numerous guests in the booth during the race. Among those who stopped by were Chuck Stevenson, Sam Hanks, J. C. Agajanian, former (and future) radio analyst Fred Agabashian, Duke Nalon, Pete DePaolo, Henry Banks, Tom Binford, Johnnie Parsons, and Johnny Boyd. Indiana Senator Vance Hartke visited the booth, escorting a delegation that included Secretary of Transportation Alan Boyd, FCC chairman Rosel H. Hyde, Utah Senator Frank Moss, and Jack Kauffmann (The Washington Star). Senator Birch Bayh also visited the booth, accompanied by his teenage son, future governor and future senator Evan Bayh, who was attending his first race. On the air, Evan correctly predicted Bobby Unser would win the race.

Indianapolis Motor Speedway Radio Network
Booth Announcers	Turn Reporters	Pit/garage reporters
Chief Announcer: Sid Collins; Driver expert: Len Sutton; Statistician: John DeCamp; Historian: Donald Davidson	Turn 1: Mike Ahern; Turn 2: Howdy Bell; Backstretch: Doug Zink; Turn 3: Ron Carrell; Turn 4: Jim Shelton	Chuck Marlowe (north); Luke Walton (center); Lou Palmer (south)

=== Television ===
The race was carried in the United States on ABC's Wide World of Sports. The broadcast was supposed to air on Saturday, June 8 but was postponed a week to Saturday June 15 due to the funeral that day of Senator Robert F. Kennedy. Jim McKay anchored the broadcast with Rodger Ward as analyst, and Chris Economaki as a pit reporter..

The race was shown live on MCA closed-circuit television in approximately 175 theaters across the United States. Charlie Brockman served as anchor.

== Gallery ==
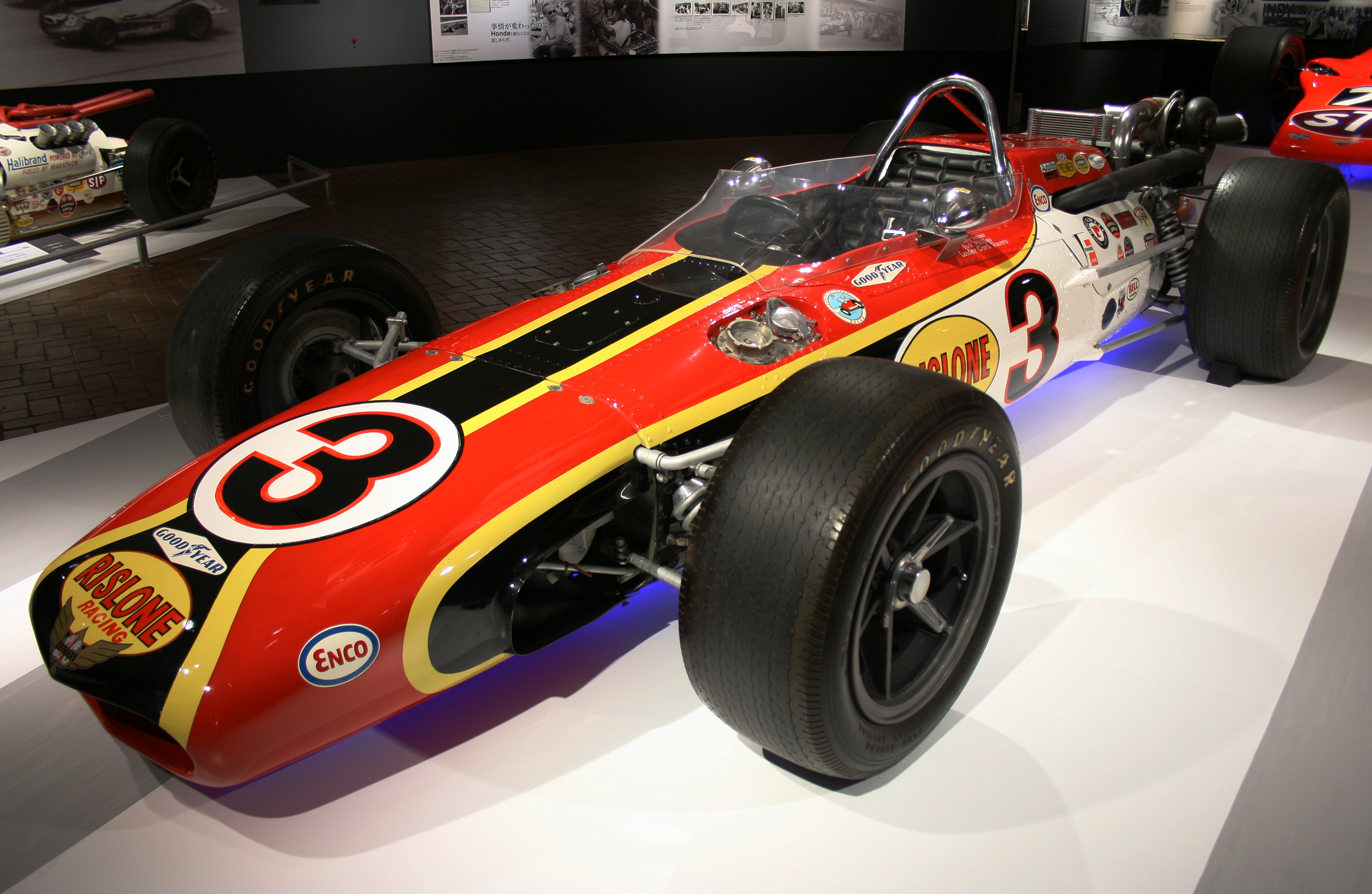
1968 winning car

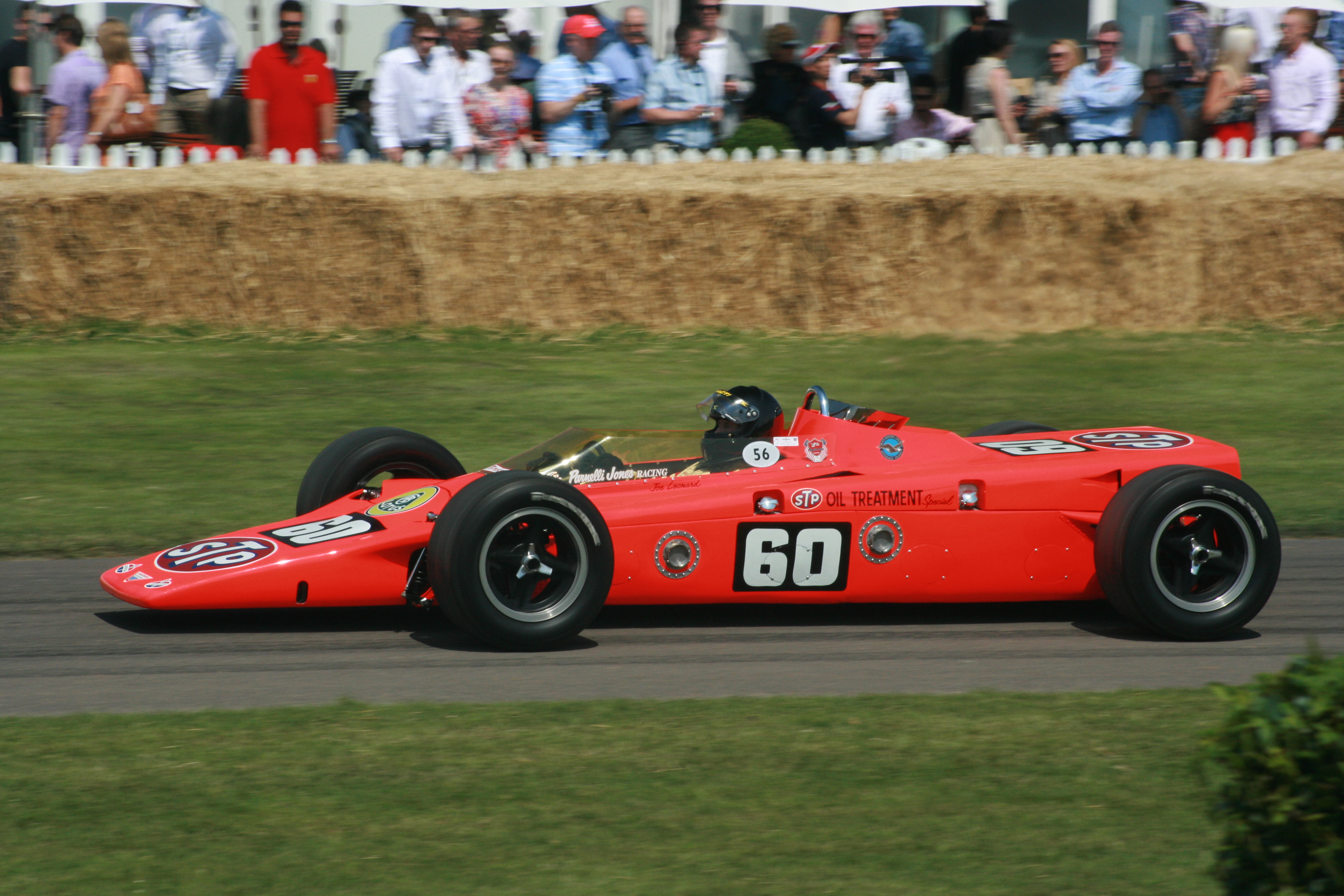
Joe Leonard's 1968 Lotus 56 Turbine

== Notes ==
=== Works cited ===
- Indianapolis 500 History: Race & All-Time Stats - Official Site
- 1968 Indianapolis 500 at RacingReference.info
- 1968 Indianapolis 500 Radio Broadcast, Indianapolis Motor Speedway Radio Network

1967 Indianapolis 500; A. J. Foyt	1968 Indianapolis 500; Bobby Unser	1969 Indianapolis 500; Mario Andretti
Preceded by 151.207 mph (1967 Indianapolis 500)	Record for the fastest average speed 152.882 mph	Succeeded by 156.867 mph (1969 Indianapolis 500)
