= 1967 Indianapolis 500 =

American motor race

51st Indianapolis 500
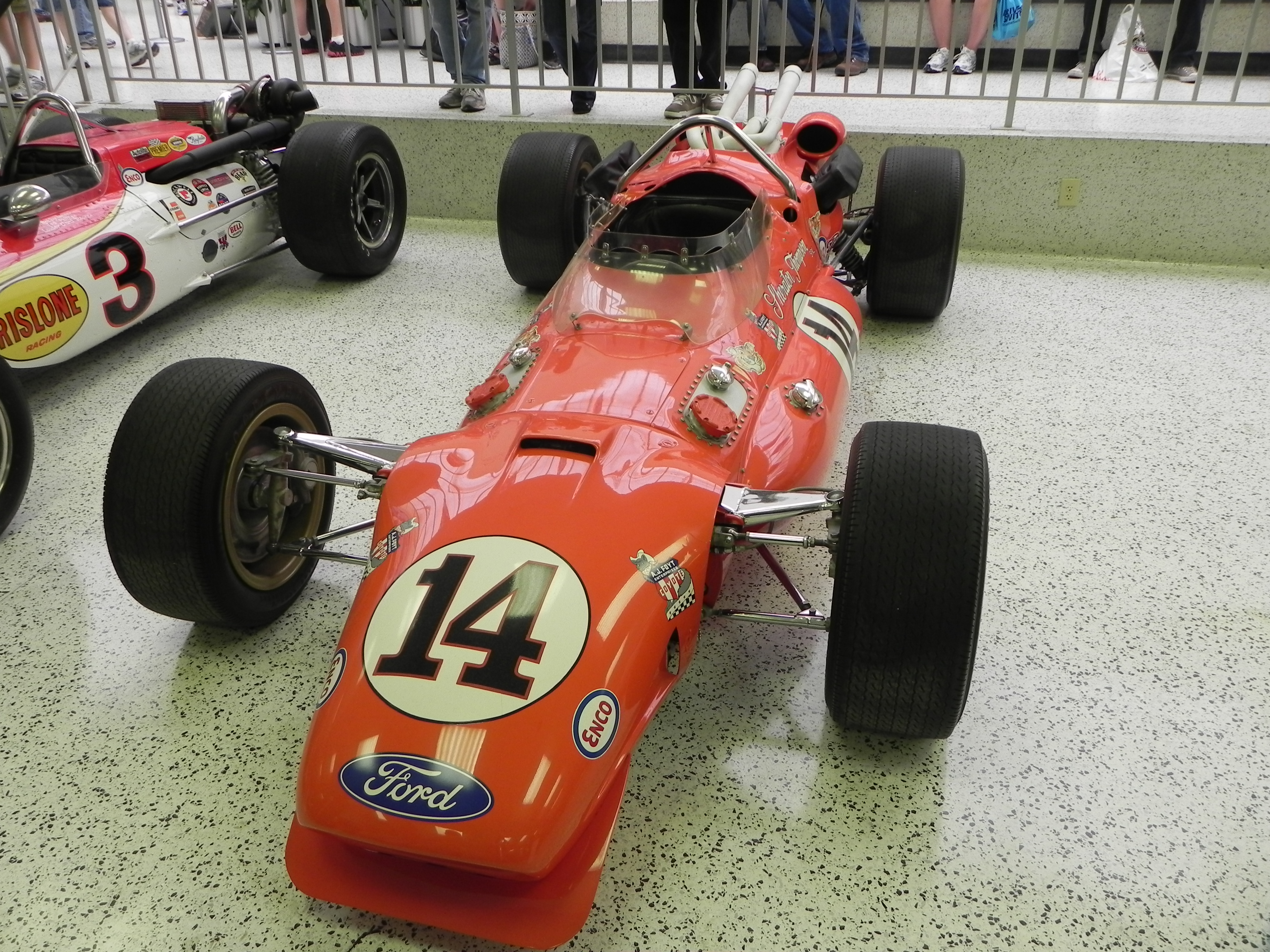

Indianapolis Motor Speedway

Indianapolis 500
- Sanctioning body: USAC
- Season: 1967 USAC season
- Date: May 30–31, 1967
- Winner: A. J. Foyt
- Winning Chief Mechanic: Tony Foyt Sr.
- Time of race: 3:18:24.22
- Average speed: 151.207 mph (243 km/h)
- Pole position: Mario Andretti
- Pole speed: 168.982 mph (272 km/h)
- Fastest qualifier: Mario Andretti
- Rookie of the Year: Denny Hulme
- Most laps led: Parnelli Jones (171)

Pre-race ceremonies
- National anthem: Purdue band
- "Back Home Again in Indiana": Russell J. Wunderlich
- Starting command: Tony Hulman
- Pace car: Chevrolet Camaro
- Pace car driver: Mauri Rose
- Starter: Pat Vidan
- Estimated attendance: 250,000 (Wed.); 175,000 (Thu.)

Television in the United States
- Network: ABC's Wide World of Sports
- Announcers: Jim McKay, Rodger Ward, Chris Economaki

Chronology
Previous	Next
1966	1968

The 51st International 500 Mile Sweepstakes was held at the Indianapolis Motor Speedway in Speedway, Indiana, over two days, Tuesday, May 30, and Wednesday, May 31, 1967. The race was dominated by Parnelli Jones in the radically new, four-wheel drive STP-Paxton Turbocar gas turbine entered by prolific car owner Andy Granatelli. With three laps to go, however, Jones coasted to a stop when a $6 transmission bearing failed. A. J. Foyt assumed the lead, and weaved his way through a pileup on the final lap, to win his third Indy 500 victory.

Foyt's victory was the first Indy 500 win for Goodyear tires since 1919. After leaving the sport in 1922, Goodyear returned to the sport in 1964, and in 1967, snapped Firestone's record of 43 consecutive Indy 500 wins.

The race was scheduled for Tuesday, May 30. The race started on time at 11:00 a.m. EST, but after only 18 laps, rain began to fall. The race was red-flagged, and the resumption was held at 10:00 a.m. the following day. Though temperatures on Wednesday were cool, skies were sunny, and the race was run to completion.

== Race schedule ==
The annual 500 Victory Banquet was scheduled for Wednesday May 31. After the race was postponed for rain, the banquet was still held as scheduled, which was just hours after the checkered flag fell.

Race schedule — April/May, 1967
Sun	Mon	Tue	Wed	Thu	Fri	Sat
23	24	25	26	27	28	29; Practice
30; Practice	1 Practice	2 Practice	3 Practice	4 Practice	5 Practice	6 Practice
7 Practice	8 Practice	9 Practice	10; Practice	11; Practice	12; Practice	13; Pole Day
14; Time Trials	15; Practice	16; Practice	17; Practice	18; Practice	19; Practice	20; Time Trials
21; Bump Day	22	23	24	25	26; Carb Day	27
28; Parade	29; Meeting	30; Indy 500	31; Indy 500			

Color	Notes
Green	Practice
Dark Blue	Time trials
Silver	Race day
Red	Rained out
Blank	No track activity

== Time trials ==
=== Pole day – Saturday May 13 ===
Going into time trials, Mario Andretti was the favorite for the pole position. On the final day of practice, he turned the fastest practice lap in Indy history at over 168 mph. Among the others that were expected to challenge for the front row were Roger McCluskey, A. J. Foyt, and Gordon Johncock. Parnelli Jones, driving the new Granatelli STP-Paxton Turbocar gas turbine was in the top ten of practice speeds, but never on top, and some in the garage area were accusing the team of sandbagging.

The first car out to qualify was Ronnie Duman. At about 2:30 p.m., Joe Leonard took over the provisional pole position with a run of 166.098 mph, a new track record. About an hour and a half later, Dan Gurney took over the pole with another record run of 167.224 mph. Gurney's time on top was short-lived, however, as Mario Andretti was the next car to make an attempt. Andretti set new 1-lap and 4-lap track records to win the pole position for the second year in a row. His third lap (169.779 mph) stood as the single lap record, and his four-lap average wound up at 168.982 mph.

At the end of the day, the field was filled to 25 cars. Later in the day, Gordon Johncock (166.559 mph) squeezed himself on to the front row, qualifying third. A. J. Foyt suffered mechanical trouble on his first attempt, and pulled off the course. Later on, he returned to the track to qualify in fourth starting position. Parnelli Jones in the Granatelli Turbine qualified 6th. As was noted by many other teams at the time, Jones qualified with a race day set-up, while the piston-powered entries practiced and qualified with "qualifying setups," including light fuel loads, lightened transmission components, higher-revving gear ratios, a percentage of "pop," or nitromethane in the fuel, and so on. The STP crew had Jones qualify with a straight race-day setup, including the use of standard fuel (aircraft-grade kerosene, in this case).

Pos	No.	Name	Speed (mph)	Notes
1	1	Mario Andretti	168.982	
2	74	Dan Gurney	167.224	
3	3	Gordon Johncock	166.559	
4	14	A. J. Foyt	166.289	
5	4	Joe Leonard	166.098	
6	40	Parnelli Jones	166.075	
7	25	Lloyd Ruby	165.229	
8	6	Bobby Unser	164.752	
9	5	Al Unser	164.594	
10	26	George Snider	164.256	
11	2	Jim McElreath	164.241	
12	39	Bobby Grim	164.084	
13	16	Art Pollard R	163.897	
14	15	Mel Kenyon	163.778	
15	53	Wally Dallenbach Sr. R	163.540	
16	31	Jim Clark	163.213	
17	98	Ronnie Duman	162.903	
18	19	Arnie Knepper	162.900	
19	45	Johnny Rutherford	162.859	
20	21	Cale Yarborough	162.830	
21	23	Larry Dickson	162.543	
—	78	Jerry Grant	162.352	Bumped by #81
—	43	Jackie Stewart	162.221	Bumped by #56
—	57	Bob Harkey	162.140	Bumped by #84
—	29	Bob Hurt R	161.261	Bumped by #23
—	27	Lucien Bianchi	—	Waved off
—	12	Roger McCluskey	—	Pulled off
—	14	A. J. Foyt	—	Pulled off
—	42	Richie Ginther R	—	Pulled off
—	82	Bob Christie	—	Pulled off
—	84	Bob Wente	—	Crash
—	41	Carl Williams	—	Waved off

=== Second day – Sunday May 14 ===
The second day of time trials was rained out.

Pos	No.	Name	Speed (mph)	Notes
—	—	—	—	Rained out

=== Third day – Saturday May 20 ===
The field filled to 33 cars after 23 attempts were made. Six cars were bumped including Jackie Stewart. Roger McCluskey, who was not able to qualify on pole day, was the fastest car of the afternoon (165.563 mph).

Pos	No.	Name	Speed (mph)	Notes
22	12	Roger McCluskey	165.563	
23	41	Carl Williams	163.696	
24	69	Denis Hulme	163.376	
25	10	Bud Tingelstad	163.228	Bumped #90
26	67	LeeRoy Yarbrough R	163.066	Bumped #23
27	8	Chuck Hulse	162.925	
28	46	Bob Veith	162.580	
—	27	Lucien Bianchi	162.484	Bumped by #42
—	56	Jim Hurtubise	162.411	Bumped #43; Bumped by #32
—	87	Jochen Rindt R	162.389	Bumped by #24
—	90	Pedro Rodriguez R	162.352	Bumped by #10
—	23	Ronnie Bucknum R	162.243	Bumped #29; Bumped by #67
—	84	Gary Congdon	161.783	Bumped #57; Bumped by #48
—	42	Richie Ginther R	—	Waved off
—	23	Ronnie Bucknum R	—	Waved off
—	56	Jim Hurtubise	—	Waved off
—	60	Mickey Shaw R	—	Waved off
—	71	Bobby Johns	—	Waved off
—	84	Gary Congdon	—	Waved off
—	47	Norm Brown R	—	Waved off
—	10	Bud Tingelstad	—	Pulled off
—	20	Masten Gregory	—	Waved off
—	24	Jackie Stewart	—	Waved off

=== Bump day – Sunday May 21 ===
Graham Hill and Jackie Stewart successfully bumped their way into the field. Jim Hurtubise tried to qualify using a front-engined car, but he was too slow.

Pos	No.	Name	Speed (mph)	Notes
29	24	Jackie Stewart	164.099	Bumped #87
30	42	Jerry Grant	163.808	Bumped #27
31	81	Graham Hill	163.317	Bumped #78
32	48	Jochen Rindt R	163.051	Bumped #84
33	32	Al Miller	162.602	Bumped #56
—	11	Jim Hurtubise	161.936	Too Slow
—	17	Bobby Johns	—	Waved off
—	85	Bill Cheesbourg	—	Waved off

== Starting grid ==
Row	Inside		Middle		Outside	
1	1	(United States) Mario Andretti	74	(United States) Dan Gurney	3	(United States) Gordon Johncock
2	14	(United States) A. J. Foyt W	4	(United States) Joe Leonard	40	(United States) Parnelli Jones W
3	25	(United States) Lloyd Ruby	6	(United States) Bobby Unser	5	(United States) Al Unser
4	26	(United States) George Snider	2	(United States) Jim McElreath	39	(United States) Bobby Grim
5	16	(United States) Art Pollard R	15	(United States) Mel Kenyon	53	(United States) Wally Dallenbach Sr. R
6	31	(United Kingdom) Jim Clark W	98	(United States) Ronnie Duman	19	(United States) Arnie Knepper
7	45	(United States) Johnny Rutherford	21	(United States) Cale Yarborough	22	(United States) Larry Dickson
8	12	(United States) Roger McCluskey	41	(United States) Carl Williams	69	(New Zealand) Denny Hulme R
9	10	(United States) Bud Tingelstad	67	(United States) Lee Roy Yarbrough R	8	(United States) Chuck Hulse
10	46	(United States) Bob Veith	24	(United Kingdom) Jackie Stewart	42	(United States) Jerry Grant
11	81	(United Kingdom) Graham Hill W	48	(Austria) Jochen Rindt R	32	(United States) Al Miller

R Indianapolis 500 rookie
W Indianapolis 500 winner

=== Alternates ===
- First alternate: Lucien Bianchi R (#27)

=== Failed to qualify ===
- Chris Amon R (#28)
- Chuck Arnold (#44)
- Lorenzo Bandini R (#32) – Withdrawn after he was killed in Monaco.
- Bob Bondurant R (#33, #88)
- Johnny Boyd (#66)
- Norm Brown R (#47)
- Ronnie Bucknum R (#23, #75)
- Bill Cheesbourg (#32)
- Bob Christie (#65, #82)
- Gary Congdon (#18, #19, #67, #76, #84, #90)
- Richie Ginther R (#42)
- Masten Gregory (#11, #20)
- Norm Hall (#50)
- Bob Harkey (#20, #57)
- Bob Hurt R (#29, #98)
- Jim Hurtubise (#11, #56, #83)
- Bruce Jacobi R (#33, #75, #77)
- Bobby Johns (#71, #76)
- Ralph Ligouri R (#35)
- Sam McQuagg R – Did not appear
- Don Meacham R (#62)
- Mike Mosley R (#91)
- Lothar Motschenbacher R (#57) – Entry declined, not in good standing with USAC
- Rick Muther R (#76) – Failed rookie orientation
- Peter Revson R (#33) – Entry declined, not in good standing with USAC
- Pedro Rodriguez R (#90)
- Vern Root R (#90)
- Ebb Rose (#83, #89)
- Les Scott R (#50)
- Sammy Sessions R (#11, #68, #75)
- Mickey Shaw R (#60)
- Al Smith R (#11, #75)
- Gig Stephens R (#36)
- Chuck Stevenson (#54)
- Don Thomas R (#73)
- Greg Weld R (#96)
- Bob Wente (#84)
- Dempsey Wilson (#11, #51)

== Race summary ==
=== Start (Tuesday) ===
The race started on Tuesday May 30 under threatening skies. At the start, polesitter Mario Andretti briefly took the lead into turn one. However, Jones swept to the outside from 6th starting position, and passed four cars in turn one. Exiting turn two, he dove below Andretti and took the lead down the backstretch. Jones ran the first lap at a record 154 mph, and started pulling out to a sizable lead.

On lap 3, LeeRoy Yarbrough spun in turn four, briefly bringing out the yellow. His car was not damaged, and he continued. After only a few laps, Mario Andretti pulled into the pits with mechanical troubles. The crew went to work on the car. On lap 18, rain began to fall, and the yellow light came on with Jones leading. On the 19th lap, the red flag came out and the race was halted at approximately 11:16 am. The rain continued most of the afternoon, and at about 4:15 p.m., officials postponed the conclusion until the next day. Scoring reverted to the completion of the 18th lap, and all cars were eligible for the resumption except Lloyd Ruby, who had already wheeled his car back to the garage with broken valves.

=== Restart (Wednesday) ===
Wednesday May 31 dawned cool but sunny and the race was resumed at 10:00 a.m. local time. George Snider fell ill overnight with a cold, and Lloyd Ruby, who had dropped out the day earlier, took over his car in relief for Wednesday. Two unscored warm-up laps were run behind the pace car, and the field of now 32 cars took the green flag to restart single-file. Jones continued where he left off and led on what was now the 19th lap.

=== First half ===
On lap 52, LeeRoy Yarbrough suffered his second spin in turn four in two days. This time he tangled with the leader Parnelli Jones. Jones went low to lap Yarbrough, but was pinched down on the apron and the two cars touched wheels. Both cars went spinning into the grass, but they were not damaged and both drivers drove away unscathed. Dan Gurney briefly took the lead after the incident, but gave it up after only two laps when he pitted.

The first half shaped up with Jones dominating in the Turbine, chased by Dan Gurney, A. J. Foyt, and Al Unser Sr., among others. On the leader's 65th lap, Mario Andretti lost a wheel in the exit of turn one. He came a stop in turn two and was out of the race with only 59 laps completed.

On his first pit stop on lap 80, Parnelli Jones escaped possible disaster as he began to pull away before the fuel hose was disengaged. The hose jerked and caused a spill, but Jones pulled away without damage and without a fire breaking out. A. J. Foyt slipped by to take the lead. Four laps later Foyt handed the lead back to Jones when he himself pitted.

Several cars were involved in a quick succession of crashes around the midway point. Art Pollard spun in turn three, but continued. Moments later, Carl Williams spun in front of Bob Veith as they diced through traffic in turn three. Veith's car suffered major damage to the nose, but both drivers were able to continue. Under the same yellow light, Wally Dallenbach wrecked into the inside wall of the mainstretch. Moments later, Cale Yarborough spun out in the north chute. Approaching the scene, Lloyd Ruby (in George Snider's car) spun out with LeeRoy Yarbrough, and both cars went sliding to the infield grass in turn four. Ruby's car hit the inside fence and was out. LeeRoy Yarbrough, after his third spin of the race, was also out. Cale Yarborough, however, got back in his car and continued. About three laps later, Johnny Rutherford wrecked on his own in turn two.

=== Second half ===
Parnelli Jones continued to dominate the race, but gave up the lead to A. J. Foyt for laps 131–149. Dan Gurney, a contender in the first half, dropped out on lap 160.

Arnie Knepper (engine), Jackie Stewart (engine), Cale Yarborough and Mel Kenyon (crash), all dropped out of the race. Jochen Rindt, who experienced a difficult month and a difficult race, dropped out with a broken valve. Rindt, apparently not impressed with the Speedway, said he was not interested in coming back, but he did return one additional time in 1968.

With about 7 laps left for the leaders, Gordon Johncock spun out, briefly bringing out the yellow. At this point, Parnelli Jones seemingly had the race wrapped up, holding nearly a full lap lead over second place A. J. Foyt. Third place Al Unser was more than two laps down. Shockingly, with only four laps to go, a $6 transmission bearing failed, and the Turbine quietly coasted to a stop near the entrance to pit lane. The STP Granatelli team was in disbelief as they ran to the car's aid.

A. J. Foyt drove by into first place with only four laps to go, but the drama was not yet over. On the final lap, Foyt was driving through turn four when a four-car crash broke out at the north end of the main straightaway. Foyt had a premonition of trouble (he later suggested that he had subconsciously noticed the crowd looking down the straightaway instead of at him) and backed off, and with savvy driving, weaved his way through the wreckage. He avoided the spinning cars and debris and took the checkered flag for his third win at Indianapolis. Foyt's winning speed of 151.207 mph (243.344 km/h) was a new record. The red and checkered flags immediately halted the race. Al Unser finished in second place for the first of three times in his career.

== Box score ==
Finish	Start	No	Name	Chassis	Engine	Tires	Qual	Laps	Status
1	4	14	(United States) A. J. Foyt W	Coyote	Ford	G	166.289	200	151.207 mph
2	9	5	(United States) Al Unser	Lola	Ford	F	164.594	198	Flagged
3	5	4	(United States) Joe Leonard	Coyote	Ford	G	166.098	197	Flagged
4	24	69	(New Zealand) Denis Hulme R	Eagle	Ford	G	163.376	197	Flagged
5	11	2	(United States) Jim McElreath	Moore	Ford	F	164.241	197	Flagged
6	6	40	(United States) Parnelli Jones W	Granatelli	Pratt & Whitney	F	166.075	196	Bearing
7	27	8	(United States) Chuck Hulse	Lola	Offenhauser	G	162.925	195	Crash FS
8	13	16	(United States) Art Pollard R	Gerhardt	Offenhauser	F	163.897	195	Flagged
9	8	6	(United States) Bobby Unser	Eagle	Ford	G	164.752	193	Flagged
10	23	41	(United States) Carl Williams	BRP	Ford	F	163.696	189	Crash FS
11	28	46	(United States) Bob Veith	Gerhardt	Offenhauser	G	162.580	189	Flagged
12	3	3	(United States) Gordon Johncock	Gerhardt	Ford	G	166.559	188	Spun T3
13	12	39	(United States) Bobby Grim	Gerhardt	Offenhauser	G	164.084	187	Crash FS
14	25	10	(United States) Bud Tingelstad	Gerhardt	Ford	F	163.228	182	Spun FS
15	21	22	(United States) Larry Dickson	Lotus	Ford	G	162.543	180	Spun FS
16	14	15	(United States) Mel Kenyon	Gerhardt	Offenhauser	G	163.778	177	Crash T3
17	20	21	(United States) Cale Yarborough	Vollstedt	Ford	F	162.830	176	Crash T3
18	29	24	(United Kingdom) Jackie Stewart	Lola	Ford	F	164.099	168	Engine
19	22	12	(United States) Roger McCluskey	Eagle	Ford	G	165.563	165	Engine
20	30	42	(United States) Jerry Grant	Eagle	Ford	G	163.808	162	Piston
21	2	74	(United States) Dan Gurney	Eagle	Ford	G	167.224	160	Piston
22	18	19	(United States) Arnie Knepper	Cecil	Ford	F	162.900	158	Engine
23	17	98	(United States) Ronnie Duman	Shrike	Offenhauser	F	162.903	154	Fuel trouble
24	32	48	(Austria) Jochen Rindt R	Eagle	Ford-Weslake	G	163.051	108	Valve
25	19	45	(United States) Johnny Rutherford	Eagle	Ford	G	162.859	103	Crash T2
26	10	26	(United States) George Snider (Laps 1–16) (United States) Lloyd Ruby (Laps 17–99)	Mongoose	Ford	F	164.256	99	Crash NC
27	26	67	(United States) LeeRoy Yarbrough R	Vollstedt	Ford	F	163.066	87	Crash NC
28	33	32	(United States) Al Miller	Gerhardt	Ford	F	162.602	74	Oil Cooler
29	15	53	(United States) Wally Dallenbach Sr. R	Huffaker	Offenhauser	G	163.540	73	Crash FS
30	1	1	(United States) Mario Andretti	Brawner	Ford	F	168.982	58	Lost wheel
31	16	31	(United Kingdom) Jim Clark W	Lotus	Ford	F	163.213	35	Piston
32	31	81	(United Kingdom) Graham Hill W	Lotus	Ford	F	163.317	23	Piston
33	7	25	(United States) Lloyd Ruby	Mongoose	Offenhauser	F	165.229	3	Valves

Note: George Snider completed laps 1–16 on Tuesday, but fell ill and was relieved by Lloyd Ruby on Wednesday for laps 17–99

W Former Indianapolis 500 winner

R Indianapolis 500 Rookie

=== Race statistics ===
Lap Leaders
Laps	Leader
1–51	Parnelli Jones
52–53	Dan Gurney
54–79	Parnelli Jones
80–83	A. J. Foyt
84–130	Parnelli Jones
131–149	A. J. Foyt
150–196	Parnelli Jones
197–200	A. J. Foyt

Total laps led
Driver	Laps
Parnelli Jones	171
A. J. Foyt	27
Dan Gurney	2

Yellow Lights: 10 for 64 minutes
Laps*	Reason
3–5	LeeRoy Yarbrough spin in turn 4 (2 minutes)
18	Rain (3 minutes; red flag)
52–53	LeeRoy Yarbrough & Parnelli Jones spin in turn 4 (3 minutes)
65–69	Mario Andretti lost wheel in turn 1 (6 minutes)
83–101	Carl Williams, Jerry Grant, Bob Veith spin in turn 3 (20 minutes); Wally Dallenbach hit wall on frontstretch Cale Yaborough spun in turn 3 LeeRoy Yarbrough & Lloyd Ruby spun turn 3
103–113	Johnny Rutherford crash in turn 2 (10 minutes)
132	Debris in turn 2 (1 minute)
165	Debris in turn 2 (1 minute)
184–191	Cale Yarborough & Mel Kenyon crash in turn 3
193–199	Gordon Johncock crash in turn 4
200	Grim, Hulse, Williams, Tinglestad, Dickson crash on frontstretch (<1 minute)
* – Approximate lap counts

Tire participation chart
Supplier	No. of starters
Goodyear	16*
Firestone	17
* – Denotes race winner

== Broadcasting ==
=== Radio ===
The race was carried live on the IMS Radio Network. Sid Collins served as chief announcer for the 16th year. It was Collins' 20th year overall with the crew. Len Sutton served as "driver expert" for the second year. At the conclusion of the race, Lou Palmer reported from victory lane.

The entire on-air crew remained consistent from 1966. The broadcast reached over 900 affiliates including Armed Forces Network, the CBC, and shortwave to Vietnam. The broadcast had an estimated 100 million listeners worldwide. The original broadcast on Tuesday May 30 came on air at 10:30 a.m. local time and was scheduled for four and a half hours, including a 30-minute pre-race segment. When the race was red flagged for rain, the network signed off at 11:45 a.m., and returned for brief weather updates at 12:15 p.m., 12:45 p.m., 1:15 p.m., 2:15 p.m., 3:15 p.m., 3:45 p.m., and 4:15 p.m., at which time the race was officially postponed. During the rain delay on Tuesday, guests to the booth included J. C. Agajanian, Rory Calhoun, as well as Lorne Greene and Michael Landon, both from the TV series Bonanza. Greene and Landon had been grand marshals for the 500 Festival Parade.

On Wednesday May 31, the broadcast came on air at 9:45 a.m. local time, leading up to the 10:00 a.m. resumption. All of the announcers and reporters from Tuesday returned to their assignments for Wednesday. Booth guests on Wednesday included Pete DePaolo, Jim Murray, Tom Harmon, and 500 Festival queen Janice Cruze Bretz. During the post-race, Sid Collins was presented with a Resolution passed by the California State Legislature from State Senator George Deukmejian and Lt. Governor Bob Finch honoring Collins' twentieth year serving on the network. After dropping out of the race with mechanical problems on lap 108, Jochen Rindt was interviewed by pit reporter Luke Walton. When asked what he thought of the "500", Rindt famously replied "not much". Walton followed up, asked if he planning to return. He flatly said "no".

For 1967, the flagship station changed from WIBC to WTHI in Terre Haute.

Indianapolis Motor Speedway Radio Network
Booth Announcers	Turn Reporters	Pit/garage reporters
Chief Announcer: Sid Collins; Driver expert: Len Sutton; Statistician: John DeCamp; Historian: Donald Davidson	Turn 1: Mike Ahern; Turn 2: Howdy Bell; Backstretch: Doug Zink; Turn 3: Ron Carrell; Turn 4: Jim Shelton	Chuck Marlowe (north); Luke Walton (center); Lou Palmer (south)

=== Television ===
The race was carried in the United States on ABC's Wide World of Sports. The broadcast aired on Saturday June 10. Jim McKay anchored the telecast for the first time, with analysts Rodger Ward and pit work from Chris Economaki. The opening featured a brief recap of time trials, followed by edited race coverage.

The broadcast has re-aired on ESPN Classic starting in May 2011.

The race was shown live on MCA closed-circuit television in approximately 150-175 theaters and venues across the United States. Charlie Brockman served as anchor. The feed was transmitted internationally to Europe utilizing the "Early Bird" satellite, and to Japan using the "Lani Bird" satellite. Due to the rain delay, coverage was not available to international viewers on Wednesday. Viewers at U.S. venues were able to watch the second day of coverage with rain checks.

ABC Television
Booth Announcers	Pit/garage reporters
Announcer: Jim McKay; Color: Rodger Ward	Chris Economaki

== Topics ==
- This race featured six former or eventual Formula One World Champions: Graham Hill, Jim Clark, Denis Hulme, Jochen Rindt, Jackie Stewart, Mario Andretti
- The NASCAR World 600 was held on Sunday May 28, and the Indy 500 was scheduled for Tuesday May 30. NASCAR driver LeeRoy Yarbrough skips Charlotte and races at Indy. He finishes 27th. Cale Yarborough becomes the first driver to compete in both races in the same year. He finished 41st at Charlotte and 17th at Indy.

== Gallery ==
NOTE: The revolutionary #40 STP Turbine in the photo taken in the Speedway Museum is actually a replica built from the blueprints (as is the replica of Parnelli Jones' 1963 #98 Indy 500-winning car): The actual #40 is in the Smithsonian's National Museum of American History.

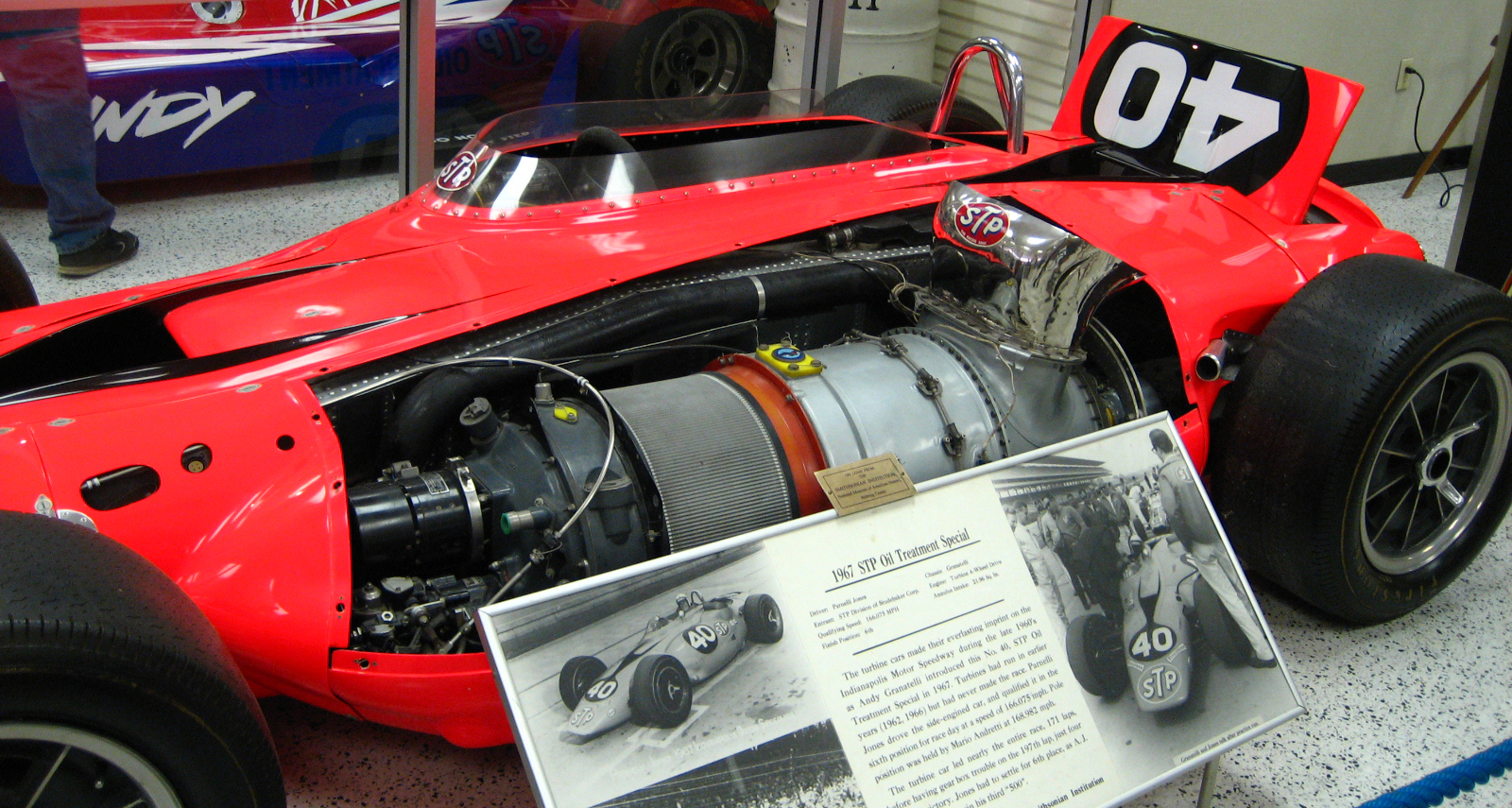
Gas turbine-'STP Oil Treatment Special'

== Notes ==
=== Works cited ===
- Indianapolis 500 History: Race & All-Time Stats - Official Site
- 1967 Indianapolis 500 Radio Broadcast, Indianapolis Motor Speedway Radio Network

1966 Indianapolis 500; Graham Hill	1967 Indianapolis 500; A. J. Foyt	1968 Indianapolis 500; Bobby Unser
Preceded by 150.686 mph (1965 Indianapolis 500)	Record for the fastest average speed 151.207 mph	Succeeded by 152.882 mph (1968 Indianapolis 500)
