= Carl Williams (racing driver) =

American racecar driver

Carl Williams (August 24, 1930 – February 24, 1973) was an American racecar driver.

Born in Grandview, Missouri, Williams was killed in a motorcycle accident in Kansas City. He drove in the USAC Championship Car series, racing in the 1965–1972 seasons, with 63 career starts, including the Indianapolis 500 in 1966–1970 and 1972. He finished in the top-ten 21 times, with his best finish in second position in 1970 at Springfield. He was married to Charlotte Williams and had two children, Linda and Cheryl and four grandchildren Kelli Searing, Melissa Searing, Tony Boyd and Lindsey Wollenberg.

== Indianapolis 500 results ==
Year	Car	Start	Qual	Rank	Finish	Laps	Led	Retired
1966	77	25	159.645	16	16	38	0	Valve
1967	41	23	163.696	18	10	189	0	Crash FS
1968	84	28	162.332	28	15	163	0	Crash BS
1969	57	30	163.265	30	25	50	0	Clutch
1970	75	19	166.590	18	9	197	0	Flagged
1972	95	22	180.469	24	29	52	0	Oil Cooler
Totals						651	0	

Starts	6
Poles	0
Front Row	0
Wins	0
Top 5	0
Top 10	2
Retired	5
