= Arnie Knepper =

American racing driver

Arnold A. "Arnie" Knepper (October 10, 1930 – June 6, 1992), was an American racecar driver.

Born in Belleville, Illinois, Knepper also died there from cancer. He drove in the USAC Championship Car series, racing in the 1963–1972 seasons, with 75 career starts and finished in the top ten 21 times. His best finishes were in 3rd position twice in 1966. He competed in the 1965-1969 Indianapolis 500 races, his top finish coming in 1965 when he came in 18th. Knepper earned a small place in Indianapolis lore when he crashed on the 87th lap of the 1969 Indianapolis 500, and instead of making the typical dash to trackside safety, stood up on his car and, facing 180-mph oncoming traffic, frantically waved his arms to warn oncoming drivers of the danger.

== Indianapolis 500 results ==
Year	Chassis	Engine	Start	Finish
1965	Kurtis Kraft	Offy	19th	18th
1966	Cecil	Ford	26th	29th
1967	Cecil	Ford	18th	22nd
1968	Vollstedt	Offy	32nd	25th
1969	Cecil	Ford	21st	22nd
1970	Gerhardt	Offy	Failed to qualify	
1971	Cecil	Ford	Failed to qualify	
1972	Eagle	Offy	Failed to qualify	
