= STP-Paxton Turbocar =

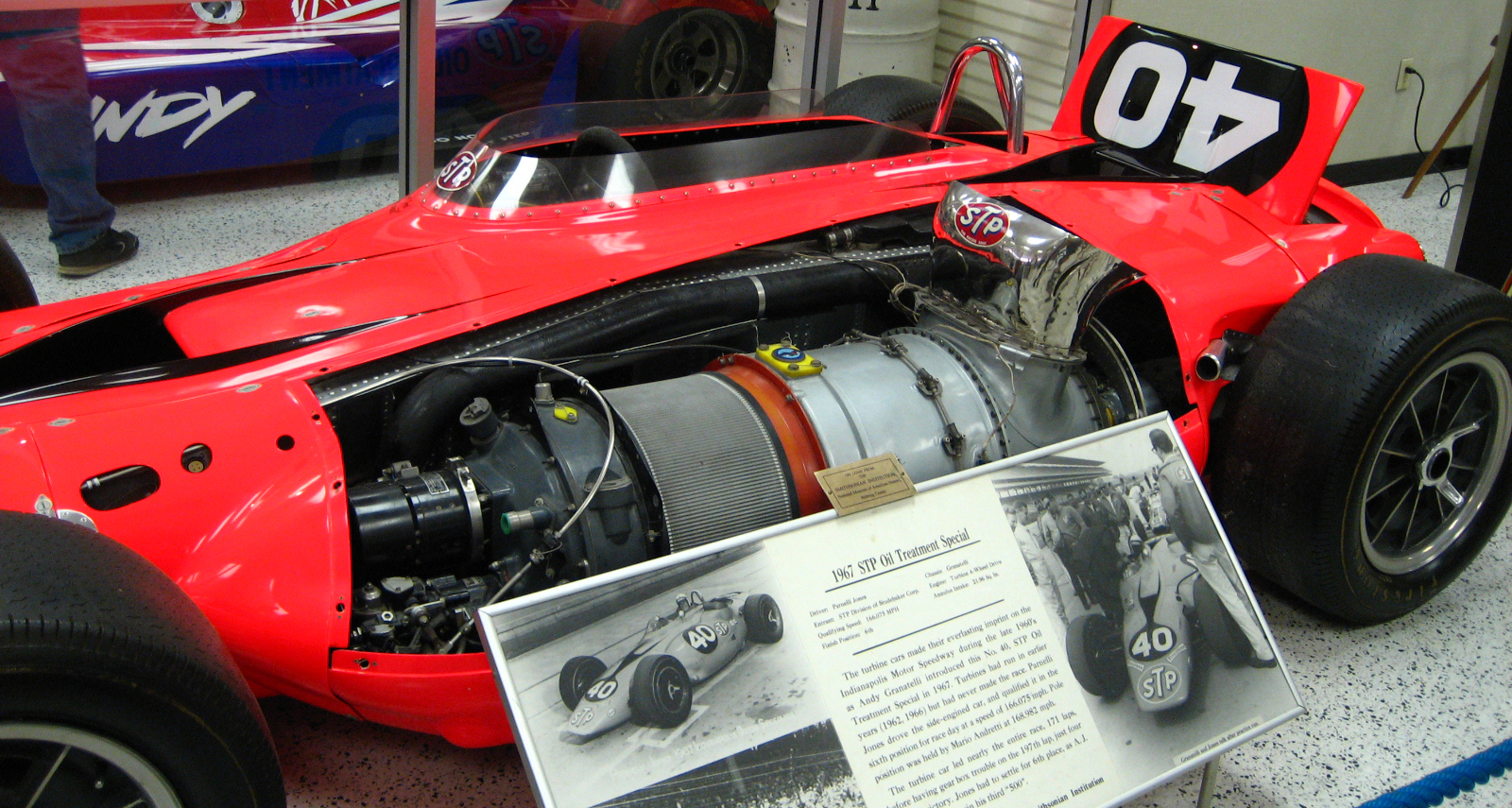
- Category: USAC Roadster
- Constructor: Granatelli
- Designers: Ken Wallis; Andy Granatelli

Technical specifications
- Chassis: Space frame
- Suspension (front): Double wishbone with coil spring
- Suspension (rear): Double wishbone with coil spring
- Engine: United Aircraft of Canada ST6B-62 gas turbine, mid-mounted
- Transmission: 1-speed
- Tires: Firestone

Competition history
- Notable entrants: (United States) STP Division of Studebaker Corp.
- Notable drivers: (United States) Parnelli Jones (United States) Joe Leonard
- Debut: 1967 Indianapolis 500
- Last season: 1968
Races	Wins	Poles	F/Laps
2	0	0	1

The STP-Paxton Turbocar was an American racing car, designed by Ken Wallis as the STP entry in the Indianapolis 500. Parnelli Jones drove it in the 1967 event. After leading for much of the race, a transmission failure with only eight miles left ended the run. It crashed during qualification for the 1968 race; the damage was not fixed and the car ended its career.

== History ==
Ken Wallis, a distant relative of Barnes Wallis, had developed a workable plan for harnessing a gas turbine to a race car. He first presented the idea to Dan Gurney, who passed on the idea. Wallis then offered the plan to Carroll Shelby and Shelby said (according to later court testimony), "Hogwash." Finally, Andy Granatelli of STP expressed interest in the concept. Wallis and his crew moved in with Andy's brother Joe at STP's Paxton division in Santa Monica, and they began work on the turbocar in January 1966. It was Granatelli who introduced a side-by-side concept — that is, putting the mid-mounted (relative to the wheelbase) engine at the driver's left (a similar idea, with the driver in an offset gondola on the left, had been used by Smokey Yunick several years earlier). Granatelli also added four-wheel drive to the design.

The aluminum frame of the car was badly warped during heat treating in early 1966, eliminating any possibility of the car racing in the 1966 Indianapolis 500. Work started over again and the car was ready for the 1967 Indianapolis 500. Parnelli Jones drove the car during tire testing in Phoenix early that year and was impressed with the car. He agreed to drive the car in the Indianapolis 500 after being offered $100,000 cash in a briefcase and half of any prize money he won.

Jones qualified the car at Indianapolis in sixth place at 166.075 mph (267.272 km/h). At the start of the race, he quickly took the lead and rarely relinquished it. However, with just 8 miles (13 km) left to go, he coasted into the pits with a transmission bearing failure. The car was refurbished and entered by STP in the 1968 Indianapolis 500. Driven by Joe Leonard, the car crashed into the turn four wall during practice and never raced again.

The car was originally donated to the Smithsonian Institution's National Museum of American History by the STP Corporation. There is an exact replica built from blueprints in the Indianapolis Motor Speedway Hall of Fame Museum. Curiously, rather than model this car Mattel chose to make a model of the similar "Shelby Turbine" which practiced at Indianapolis in 1968 as one of the popular Hot Wheels toy cars. The Lotus 56 used a modified version of the same engine and four-wheel drive in a more advanced wedge-shaped body with new USAC intake restrictions, but one car crashed in turn one during practice killing driver Mike Spence and the three entered into the race did not finish either; subsequently USAC banned turbines and four-wheel drive cars entirely.

== Design ==
The STP-Paxton Turbocar was built around an aluminum box-shaped backbone. The driver was seated on the right side of the backbone, while the engine, a Pratt & Whitney Canada ST6B-62 turbine engine, was mounted on the left side of the backbone. Though never successful as an automobile powerplant, the small aircraft engine it was based on would become one of the most popular turboprop aircraft engines in history. The engine drove a Ferguson four-wheel drive system, which transmitted the power to the wheels. A torque converter eliminated the need for a clutch pedal and gearshift. The engine idled at 54% of full throttle, which meant that the driver didn't even have to press the accelerator pedal to pull away; all he had to do was ease his foot off the brake pedal. A movable panel was mounted behind the cockpit, which acted as an airbrake. The suspension's coil springs were located inside the backbone and the suspension A-frames had airfoil cross-sections. The car weighed 1,750 pounds (790 kg), compared to the Indy minimum weight of 1,350 pounds (612 kg).

USAC had limited the engine intake area to 23.999 square inches (154.83 cm^{2}) to limit the turbine's power output, but the engine still produced 550 hp. However, drivers reported that it had a three-second throttle lag. In less than a month after the 1967 Indianapolis 500, USAC cut the allowable turbine air intake area from 23.999 to 15.999 square inches (103.22 cm^{2}) and imposed the ruling immediately, although it had been customary to give two years' notice of engine changes. With the reduced inlet area, the maximum lap speed that could be achieved was 161 mph (259 km/h).

== Later history ==
Television comedian Johnny Carson once drove the Turbine at the Indianapolis Motor Speedway during a private test session.

The cowling for the car was misplaced for over 20 years. It was found in 2007 in an office at the Smithsonian Institution.

Wallis went on to design a similar car for Carroll Shelby, who entered two cars for the 1968 Indianapolis 500, intending them to be driven by New Zealanders Denny Hulme and Bruce McLaren. However, the cars were withdrawn following Mike Spence's fatal crash while practicing in a Lotus 56, another turbine car. Shelby claimed he withdrew the cars for safety reasons, but they were actually withdrawn because changes in the Indianapolis 500 regulations had limited the ability of turbine-powered cars. Hulme competed in the race driving a car powered by a Ford Indy V8 engine, while McLaren failed to qualify.

The car on exhibit in the Speedway Museum is an exact replica of the actual car, which car owner STP Corporation donated to the Smithsonian Institution, built from the blueprints.

== See also ==
- Gas turbine
