= Bob Veith =

American racing driver (1924–2006)

- Born: Robert James Veith; November 1, 1924 Tulare, California, U.S.
- Died: March 29, 2006 (aged 81) Santa Rosa, California, U.S.

Champ Car career
- 55 races run over 16 years
- Years active: 1955–1970
- Best finish: 7th – 1956
- First race: 1955 Milwaukee 250 (Milwaukee)
- Last race: 1968 Indianapolis 500 (Indianapolis)
Wins	Podiums	Poles
0	1	1

Formula One World Championship career
- Active years: 1956–1960
- Team(s): Phillips, Kurtis Kraft, Moore, Meskowski
- Entries: 5
- Championships: 0
- Wins: 0
- Podiums: 0
- Career points: 0
- Pole positions: 0
- Fastest laps: 0
- First entry: 1956 Indianapolis 500
- Last entry: 1960 Indianapolis 500

Robert James Veith (November 1, 1924 – March 29, 2006) was an American racecar driver.

Veith drove in the AAA and USAC Championship Car series, racing from 1955 to 1968 with 63 starts. He finished in the top-ten 37 times, with a best finish of second twice, both in 1958.

Veith suffered bruises and abrasions in a practice crash at Daytona International Speedway on March 29, 1959. He was saved by the roll bar when sliding upside down. The accident was caused by the starter shaft, which had been left in the car.

Veith qualified for his first Indianapolis 500 in 1956, finishing seventh that year to win the Rookie of the Year award. After another top-ten finish the next year, he qualified fourth in 1958 but was knocked out of the race in a first lap accident that killed Pat O'Connor. He competed in the 500 eight more times, with his last start coming in 1968.

== Indianapolis 500 results ==
Year	Car	Start	Qual	Rank	Finish	Laps	Led	Retired
1956	14	23	142.535	16	7	200	0	Running
1957	7	16	141.016	19	9	200	0	Running
1958	14	4	144.881	4	26	1	0	Crash T3
1959	74	7	144.023	8	12	200	0	Running
1960	44	25	143.363	23	8	200	0	Running
1962	96	19	146.157	32	33	12	0	Engine
1963	86	24	148.289	26	26	74	0	Valve
1964	54	23	153.381	10	19	88	0	Piston
1965	54	10	156.427	11	24	58	0	Piston
1967	46	28	162.580	32	11	189	0	Flagged
1968	16	24	163.495	24	11	196	0	Flagged
Totals						1418	0	

Starts	11
Poles	0
Front Row	0
Wins	0
Top 5	0
Top 10	3
Retired	5

== World Championship career summary ==
The Indianapolis 500 was part of the FIA World Championship from 1950 through 1960. Drivers competing at Indy during those years were credited with World Championship points and participation. Veith participated in five World Championship races but scored no World Championship points.

Sporting positions
Preceded by Al Herman	Indianapolis 500; Rookie of the Year; 1956	Succeeded by Don Edmunds
