= Andy Granatelli =

American racing driver (1923–2013)

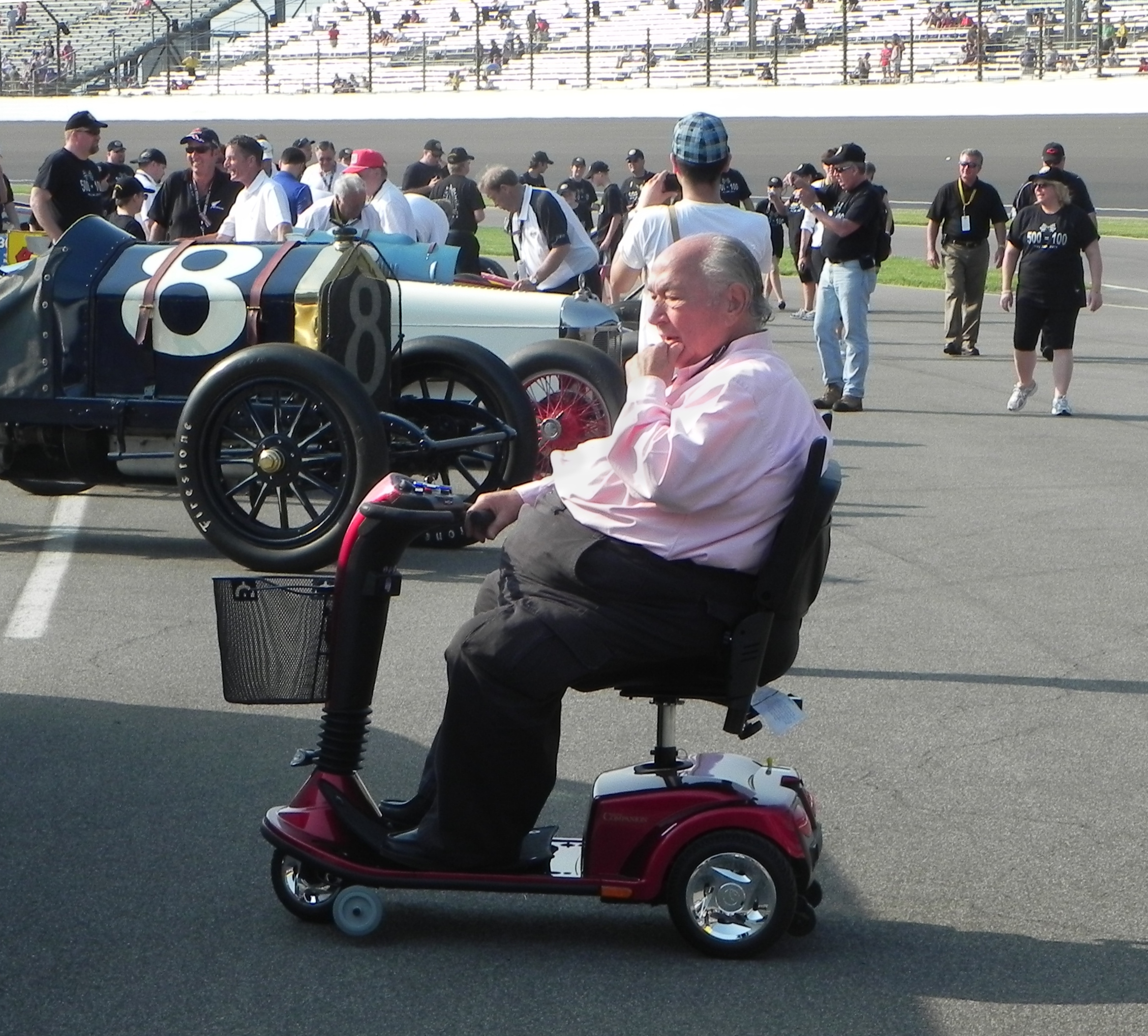
- Granatelli at the 2011 Indianapolis 500
- Born: March 18, 1923; Dallas, Texas, U.S.
- Died: December 29, 2013 (aged 90); Santa Barbara, California, U.S.
- Known for: CEO of motor oil company STP

Anthony "Andy" Granatelli (March 18, 1923 – December 29, 2013) was an American businessman, most prominent as the CEO of STP as well as a major figure in automobile racing events.

Granatelli was born in Dallas, Texas. Along with his brothers Vince and Joe, he first worked as an auto mechanic and "speed-shop" entrepreneur, modifying engines such as the flathead Ford into racing-quality equipment. During World War II, he became a promoter of automobile racing events, such as the Hurricane Racing Association (which combined racing opportunities for up-and-coming drivers with crowd-pleasing theatrics). Hurricane events, according to Granatelli in his autobiography They Call Me Mister 500, included drivers who were experts at executing—and surviving—roll-over and end-over-end crashes, and also an ambulance that not only got caught up into the race but also ejected a stretcher (with a dummy on it) into the way of the racers.

== Professional career ==
In 1946, the three brothers entered the first of several Indianapolis 500 races, as the Grancor racing team. They did their own mechanical work, and brought innovations like fully independent suspension, yet never made it to "Victory Lane". In 1948, Andy decided to try to qualify as a driver, and nearly did so, but a horrendous crash during his qualifying run ended that part of his career.

In the 1950s, in Chicago, Granatelli served as the promoter of auto races at Soldier Field, as well as at other venues.

Later in the 1950s, Granatelli and his brothers toured across the United States doing stunt shows with a rocket-powered car they built, using JATO rockets built for USAF. These actual events became the root of the Internet JATO Rocket Car non-myth that has persisted since the 1980s.

Granatelli became visible in the racing world in the 1960s as the spokesman for STP oil and gasoline treatment products, appearing on its television and radio advertisements as well as sponsoring race cars. He clad his pit crews in white coveralls with the oval STP logo scattered all over them, and once wore a suit jacket with the same STP-laden design. He made a cameo appearance in the 1968 Disney movie The Love Bug.

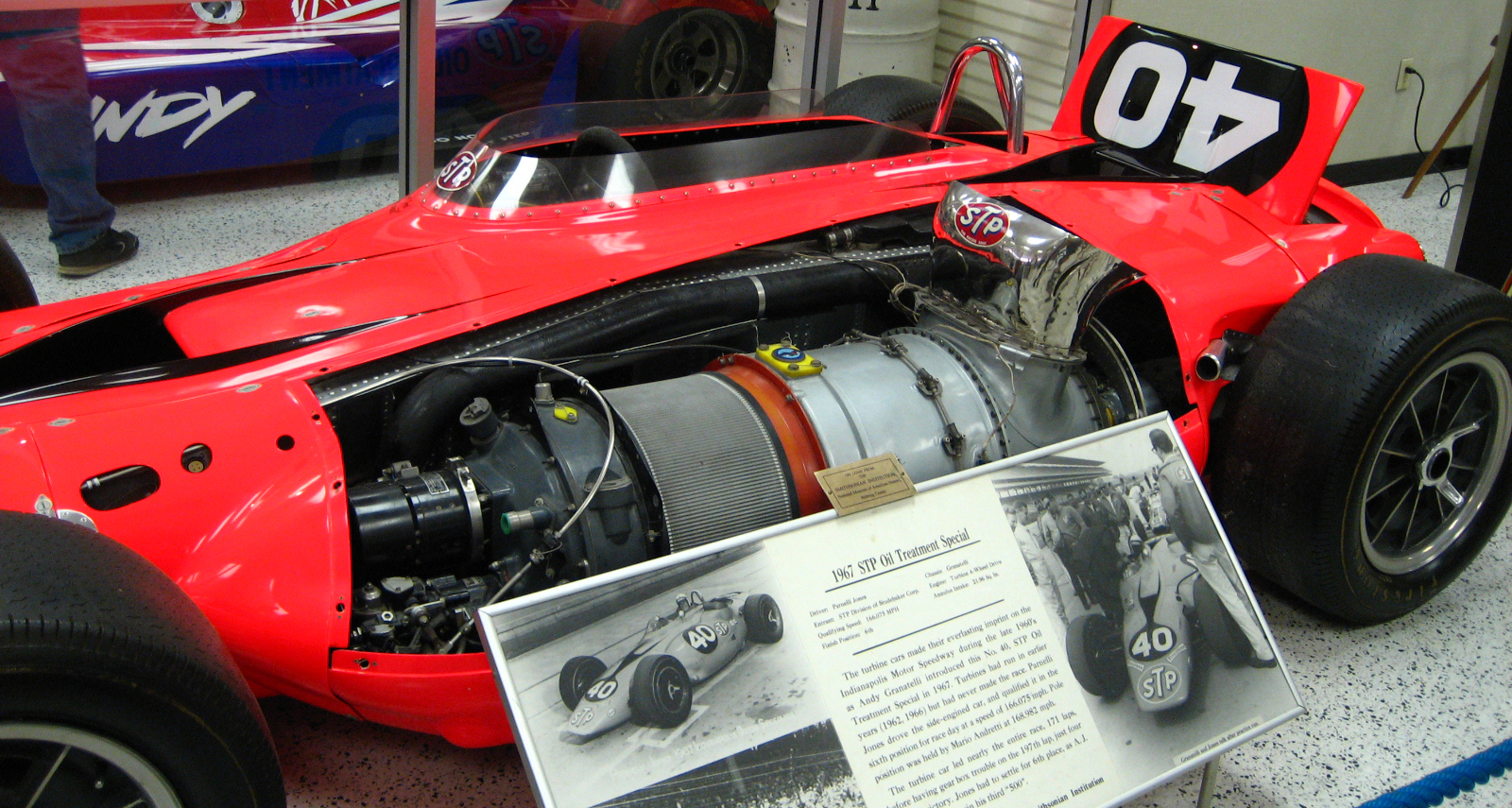
STP-Paxton Turbocar from the 1967 Indianapolis 500.

Granatelli's cars became a significant presence at the Indianapolis 500. While he first gained notoriety by re-introducing the Novi engine, his best known entries were his turbine-powered cars in 1967 and 1968. In both years, he saw probable race-winners fail near the end; Joe Leonard's breakdown in the Lotus 56 with 10 laps remaining in 1968 had been topped the previous year when Parnelli Jones, leading comfortably with just three laps to go, suffered the failure of a six dollar transmission bearing in the STP-Paxton Turbocar and retired, handing a sure victory to A. J. Foyt.

Granatelli was awarded as an Indianapolis 500 winner in 1969. After his innovative Lotus four-wheel drive car was destroyed in practice, his driver Mario Andretti, nursing the burns from the Lotus crash, won at the wheel of a year-old backup car. Before Andretti could be traditionally kissed in "Victory Lane" by the Queen of the "500 Festival", Granatelli got there first, and his kiss on Andretti's cheek became one of the 500's most memorable images. However, rumor is that the kiss began the infamous Indianapolis 500 curse that is named for Mario Andretti's family.

In 1973, Granatelli retired his USAC team, and STP became a sponsor of Patrick Racing. Gordon Johncock won the 1973 and 1982 Indianapolis 500 for the brand.

It was believed that Granatelli attended every Indianapolis 500, whether as a participant or as a spectator, from 1946–2012. He did not attend the race in 2013, and died later that year.

== Business ventures ==
Granatelli bought Tuneup Masters in 1976 for $300,000. He sold it for $60 million in 1989.

== Awards ==
Granatelli was inducted into the International Motorsports Hall of Fame in 1992 and the Motorsports Hall of Fame of America in 2001. Granatelli was inducted in the National Sprint Car Hall of Fame in 2011 and the National Midget Auto Racing Hall of Fame in 2013.

== Death ==
Granatelli died from congestive heart failure at the age of 90 on December 29, 2013 in Santa Barbara, California.

== Related reading ==
- Anthony (Andy) Granatelli They Call Me Mister 500. 1969

== Filmography ==
Year	Title	Role	Notes
1968	The Love Bug	Association President	
