= Sonny Ates =

American racing driver

- Born: March 28, 1935; Monroe, Louisiana, U.S.
- Died: October 25, 2010 (aged 75); Phoenix, Arizona, U.S.

Charles "Sonny" Ates (March 28, 1935 – October 25, 2010) was an American racecar driver.

== Biography ==
Ates was born in Monroe, Louisiana. He raced in the USAC Championship Car series in the 1968–1970 seasons, with 15 career starts, including the 1969 Indianapolis 500. He finished in the top-ten five times, with his best finish in fifth position in 1968 at Brooklyn.

Ates was one of the best Sprint Car racers during the 1960s and 1970s. He held the world speed record for a sprint car by being the fastest at the famed Winchester Speedway in Winchester, Indiana. He would often help new drivers find the right "groove" at that track.

Ates died in Phoenix, Arizona on October 25, 2010.
