= STP (motor oil company) =

American automotive products brand name

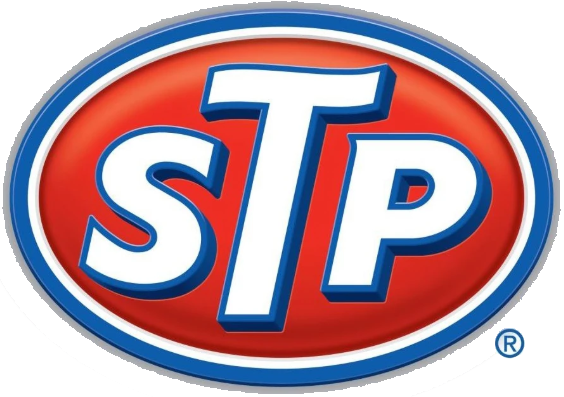

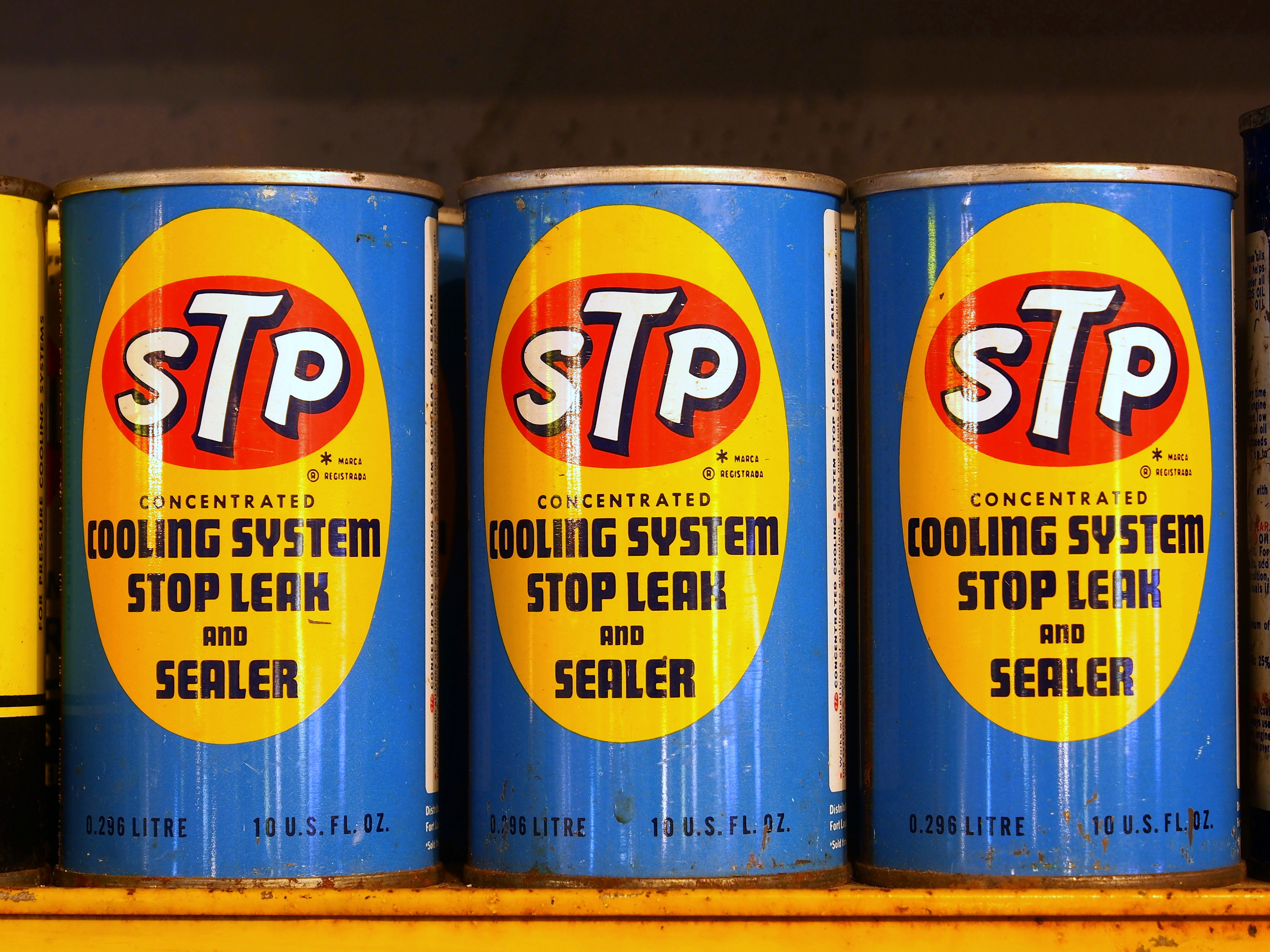
- STP cooling system stop-leak and sealer cans
- Product type: Automotive performance products
- Current owner: Energizer Holdings (2018–)
- Country: United States
- Introduced: 1954; 72 years ago
- Previous owners: See below
- Website: stp.com

STP is an American brand of automotive aftermarket products, especially lubricants. The range of STP products includes motor oil, oil and fuel aditives, and brake fluids.

The name STP began as an abbreviation of "Scientifically Treated Petroleum". The brand has been owned by Energizer Holdings since November 2018.

== History ==
=== Beginning and evolution ===
Chemical Compounds was founded in 1953 by three businessmen, Charles Dwight (Doc) Liggett, Jim Hill and Robert De Hart, with $3,000 in start-up capital in St. Joseph, Missouri. Their sole product was "STP Oil Treatment", which was first introduced in 1954; the name was derived from "Scientifically Treated Petroleum". In 1961, the company was acquired by the Studebaker-Packard Corporation.

Studebaker briefly tied STP into its advertising as an abbreviation for "Studebaker Tested Products". However, Studebaker-Packard CEO Sherwood Egbert felt that STP could one day outpace its parent company and recruited Andy Granatelli as the CEO of STP to help raise the product’s image. At the same time, Granatelli became the public face of STP, often wearing a white suit emblazoned with the red oval STP logo to races, distributing thousands of all-weather STP stickers. Granatelli ran two Novi specials at the 1964 Indianapolis 500. Jim Hurtubise and Bobby Unser were the drivers. An hour-long black and white film called Way of a Champion was made of the 1964 and 1965 races, centering on the Novis.

Studebaker exited the auto manufacturing and sales business in 1966 and launched new strategies to expand and develop its other corporate business units including the Studebaker petroleum division. Under the new Studebaker strategy, STP sales continued to grow. to the point where it was spun off into a publicly traded company in 1969. In 1976, it was acquired by Esmark, which was in turn purchased by Beatrice Foods in 1984. Beatrice sold STP to Union Carbide the next year. In 1986, Union Carbide's auto products, which included Prestone and Simoniz, were subject to a leveraged buyout. The resulting company, First Brands, was purchased by Clorox in 1998.

In the fall of 2006, STP fuel additives began being used in Marathon gasolines, likely to compete with Chevron's Techron additive.

In 2010, Clorox sold Armor All and STP to Avista Capital Partners. It named the business Armored AutoGroup. In April 2015, the Armored AutoGroup was acquired by Spectrum Brands. Energizer bought the Spectrum's auto care brands, including Armor All, A/C Pro and STP, for $1.25 billion in cash and stock.

=== Legal issues ===
In 1976, STP faced a consumer protection order that required it to have scientific backing for certain statements and prohibited making false claims. In 1978, it paid a $500,000 civil penalty over claims. In 1995, STP paid $888,000 to settle Federal Trade Commission charges of false advertising.

=== Brand owners ===
Company	Period	Ref.
Chemical Compounds	1953–1961	
Studebaker-Packard Corporation	1961–1976	
Esmark	1976–1984	
Beatrice Foods	1984–1985	
Union Carbide	1985–1986	
First Brands Corp.	1986–1998	
Clorox	1998–2010	
Avista Capital Partners	2010–2015	
Spectrum Brands	2015–2018	
Energizer Holdings	2018–present	

== Oil treatment ==
STP Oil Treatment contains zinc dithiophosphate as an anti-wear additive.

== Involvement in motor racing and sponsorships ==
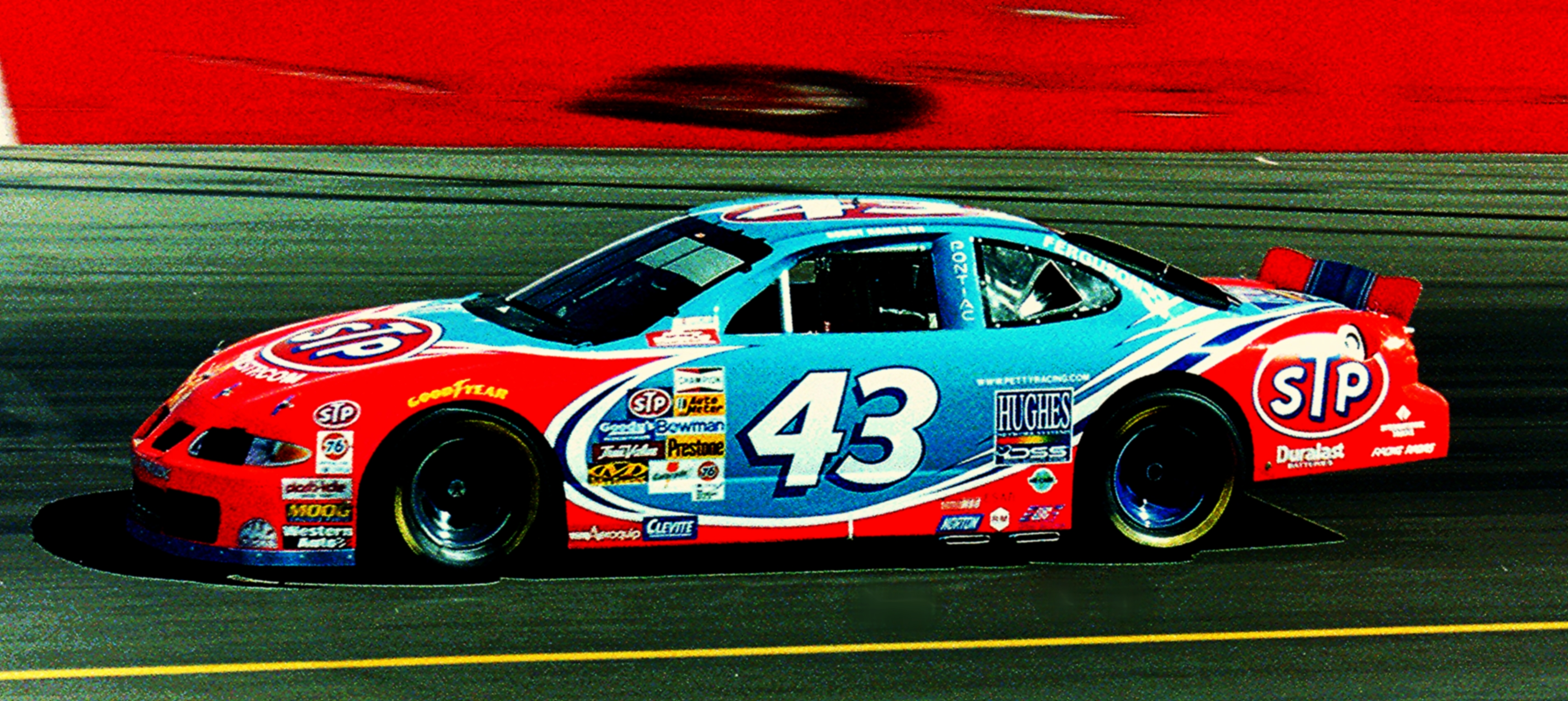
The #43 driven by Bobby Hamilton at Phoenix International Raceway

In 1970, STP CEO Andy Granatelli founded the STP Formula One Team. Mario Andretti was hired to drive. The team competed in a total of five races running a March Engineering chassis, their best result being a third place at the 1970 Spanish Grand Prix. In 1972 Granatelli agreed to sponsor NASCAR champion Richard Petty, but their deal almost fell apart before their first race. Granatelli insisted the car be STP day-glo red. Petty held out for his iconic Petty blue, and neither would budge. The resulting two-tone red and blue scheme became more famous than either color alone.

STP sponsored Petty through the end of his driving career in 1992, then Bobby Hamilton, and John Andretti in Petty Enterprises' famous #43. That partnership ended shortly after its acquisition by Clorox. STP and the Petty family hold the second-longest relationship in automobile racing history (1972–2000).

In August 2012, STP announced that it would be the title sponsor of the World of Outlaws Sprint Car Series in 2013.

On February 21, 2013, STP announced a return to NASCAR Sprint Cup Series sponsorship in a multi-year deal for the STP Gas Booster 500 starting April 7, 2013 at Martinsville Speedway along with a return as primary sponsor of the Richard Petty Motorsports No. 43 for the 2013 STP Gas Booster 500. STP also sponsored the Xfinity Series race STP 300 from 2011 to 2013 at Chicagoland Speedway.
