= Andretti curse =

Superstition in sports

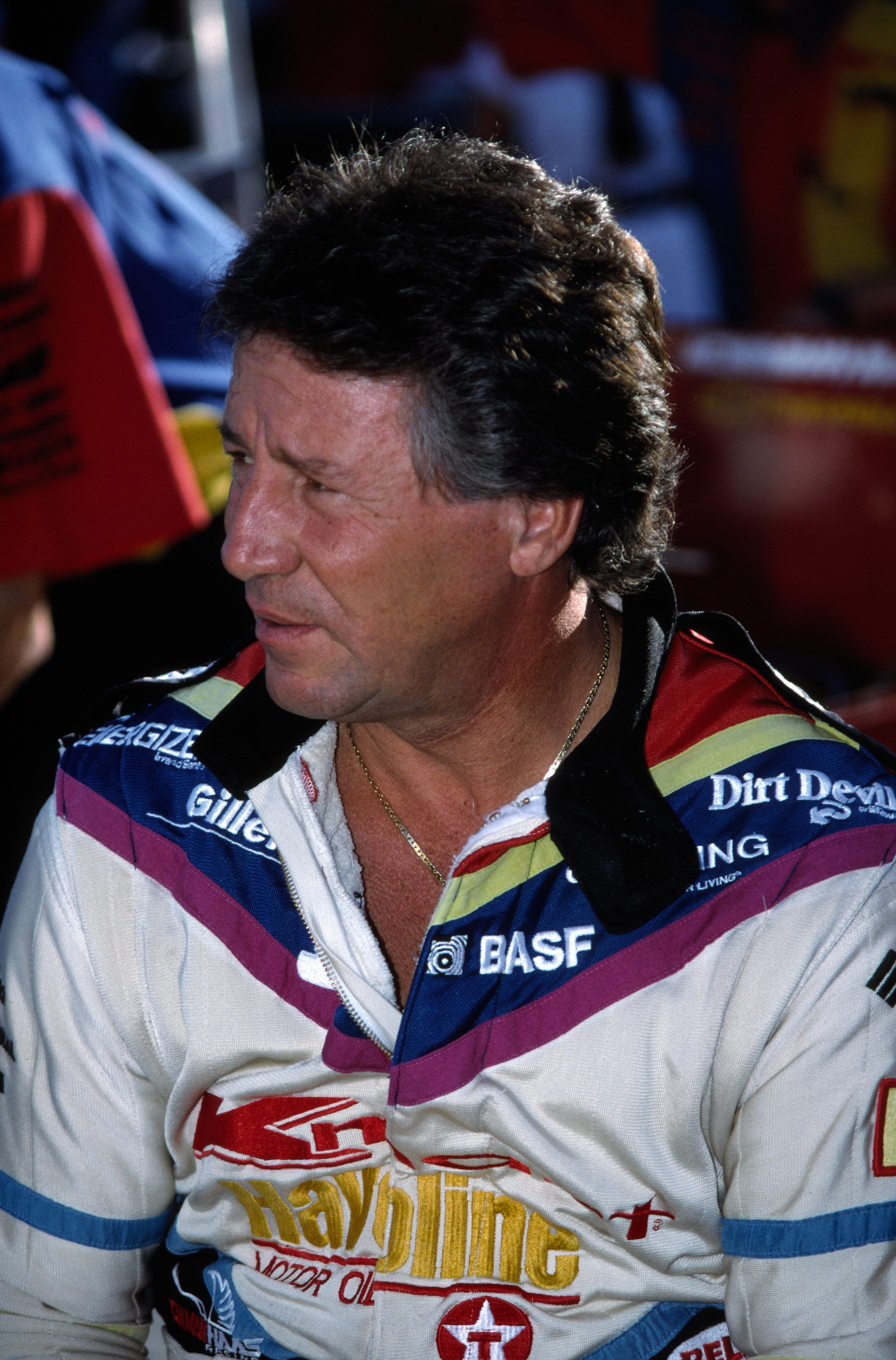
Family patriarch Mario Andretti

The Andretti Curse, sometimes referred to as Andretti Luck, is a sports-related curse in a string of bad luck the Andretti racing family has experienced in their efforts to win the Indianapolis 500 at Indianapolis Motor Speedway.

Patriarch Mario Andretti won the Indianapolis 500 in 1969. In victory lane, prolific car owner Andy Granatelli planted a kiss on the young Andretti's cheek. Following the win, despite a Hall of Fame career in Indy cars, Formula One, stock cars, and sports cars, Andretti never managed to win the race again before his retirement in 1994. The misfortune has extended to his sons Michael and Jeff, nephew John, and grandson Marco, totaling 80 starts. The reasons for defeat have included a bevy of mechanical failures, crashes, and a last-lap pass in 2006.

According to Robin Miller, the curse started in 1970 when Mario Andretti, Andy Granatelli, and Clint Brawner were involved in feud over the team. Partners Granatelli and Brawner split, and Andretti sided with Granatelli. Brawner's wife Kay supposedly cast a hex upon them, promising never would an Andretti ever again win the Indianapolis 500.

Success has not completely eluded the Andretti family. Michael Andretti won the Indianapolis 500 five times as a car owner of Andretti Autosport. The racing team, formerly known as Team Green also won the race in 1995, prior to Andretti's involvement. Mario, Michael, Jeff, and Marco were all winners of the Indy 500 Rookie of the Year award. Marco, meanwhile, is the only family member besides Mario to win a race of any kind at the Speedway, the Liberty Challenge for the Infiniti Pro Series on the combined road course at the Speedway in 2005.

== Mario Andretti ==
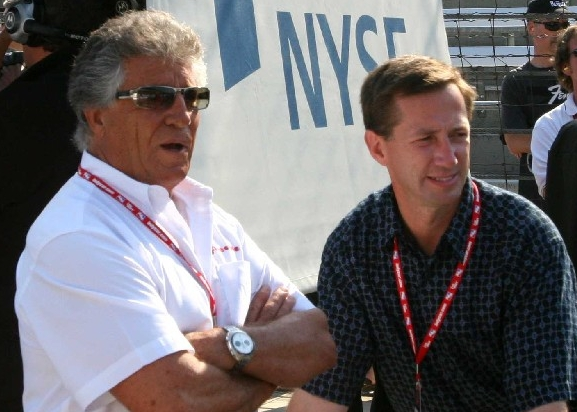
Mario Andretti (left) with his nephew John Andretti (right) at the 2007 Indy 500

Mario Andretti was the first of the Andretti family to experience success in the top levels of motorsports, going on to have a long and storied career. Mario became one of the most successful drivers of all time, winning four Indy car titles, the 1978 Formula One World Championship, and IROC VI. Andretti amassed 109 career wins on major circuits including, along with the aforementioned disciplines, wins in IMSA, USAC Stock Cars, and the NASCAR Daytona 500. He was the first driver to exceed 200 miles per hour while practicing for the 1977 Indianapolis 500.

In addition to his individual wins, Andretti has been enshrined in the Indianapolis Motor Speedway Hall of Fame, International Motorsports Hall of Fame, the Motorsports Hall of Fame of America, National Sprint Car Hall of Fame, Long Beach Walk of Fame, and Automotive Hall of Fame. He was named Driver of the Year three times, and Driver of the Quarter Century as well.

Mario competed 29 times in the Indianapolis 500, with only a single victory in 1969 to his credit, which occurred very early in his career. His unsuccessful quest for a second victory was documented by television, radio, media, and fans. A prevailing opinion in racing circles began to grow that a perceived bad luck "curse" had overcome him (and his family) at the Indianapolis Motor Speedway. Andretti himself said that "Lady Luck" seemed to be against him at times. Meanwhile, fellow "Brickyard" legends of his era (A. J. Foyt, Al Unser Sr., Al Unser Jr., Bobby Unser, Johnny Rutherford, Gordon Johncock, and Rick Mears) all racked up multiple Indy 500 wins. Andretti's perceived curse became such a popular "watercooler topic" during the month of May that some fans were known to have betting pools to guess which lap he would drop out of the race.

In 29 total starts, Andretti finished the full 500 miles just five times: his rookie year (1965), his lone victory (1969), his two runner-up finishes (1981 and 1985), and 1993.

=== Indianapolis 500 ===
1965: Mario Andretti made a solid debut at Indianapolis, qualifying 4th and finishing 3rd. On pole day, Mario was one of the first cars on the track and he delighted the crowd with a fast run of 158.849 mph. His fourth lap of 159.405 mph was a new one-lap track record at the time. Though his time sitting on the provisional pole position was short, he still managed to qualify for the inside of row two. On race day, Mario was running a strong third late in the race. He was even within striking distance of second place after Parnelli Jones began to sputter on the last lap while low on fuel. The third place debut cemented Mario as a new fan favorite at Indy. Mario was awarded the Rookie of the Year honors, receiving an almost unanimous 23 of 24 votes cast.

1966: In his second Indianapolis 500, Mario Andretti shattered the track record in time trials and earned his first pole position. Mario's four-lap average of 165.899 mph, however, was overshadowed by the fatal accident of Chuck Rodee less than a half hour later. On race day, starting up front was fortuitous, as Mario avoided the massive eleven-car pileup at the start. After the cleanup, the first five laps were run single-file under the yellow light after the crash, with polesitter Andretti as the lead car. Then Johnny Boyd's crash on lap 6 extended the yellow through lap 16. When the green flag came finally out on lap 17, Mario's engine was smoking and he lost power. Running slowly under the caution light for the extended period of time had apparently caused overheating. The engine broke a valve, and would drop out after only 27 laps. Due to the depleted field, he placed 18th.

1967: Mario Andretti became the fifth driver in Indy history to win back to back pole positions. His third lap (169.779 mph) was new one-lap track record. Striving to break the 170 mph barrier on his fourth and final lap, his car slipped, and he fell short. He still managed a record four-lap average of 168.982 mph, and won the pole by a comfortable margin. Meanwhile, Parnelli Jones in the STP Turbine qualified sixth. On race day (May 30), Mario took the lead into turn one, but by the exit of turn two, Parnelli Jones had blown by him in the Turbine powered car. After only 12 laps, Mario was forced to pit with a bad clutch. Moments later, rain began to fall, and the race was halted. The red flag allowed Mario's team to make repairs. The race restarted the following day (May 31) with Mario lined up 32nd, six laps down. Mario quickly began charging through the pack, passing many cars and posting some of the fastest laps of the race up to that point, On his 58th lap, he began to feel a vibration, and decided to slow down. A few seconds later, his right front wheel came off. He dropped out of the race and placed 30th. Despite 8 wins during the season, the poor finish at Indy likely cost Andretti the 1967 USAC Championship.

1968: On pole day, looking to become the first driver to win three consecutive poles, Mario Andretti qualified 4th, but not without all sorts of trouble. Twice the team had to wheel the car back to the garage with fouled spark plugs, then he burned a piston, requiring an engine change. Mario managed the inside of the second row (167.691 mph), but he could not get anywhere near the front row, all three of whom broke 170 mph. On race day, Mario suffered a stuck wastegate and piston failure on lap 2, and finished in last place. A few minutes later, he climbed into the car of his teammate, Larry Dickson to drive relief. He did not fare any better, as that car dropped out after 24 laps with a bad piston. For the second year in a row, a bad finish at Indy likely cost Mario the USAC Championship. He lost by only 11 points to Bobby Unser.

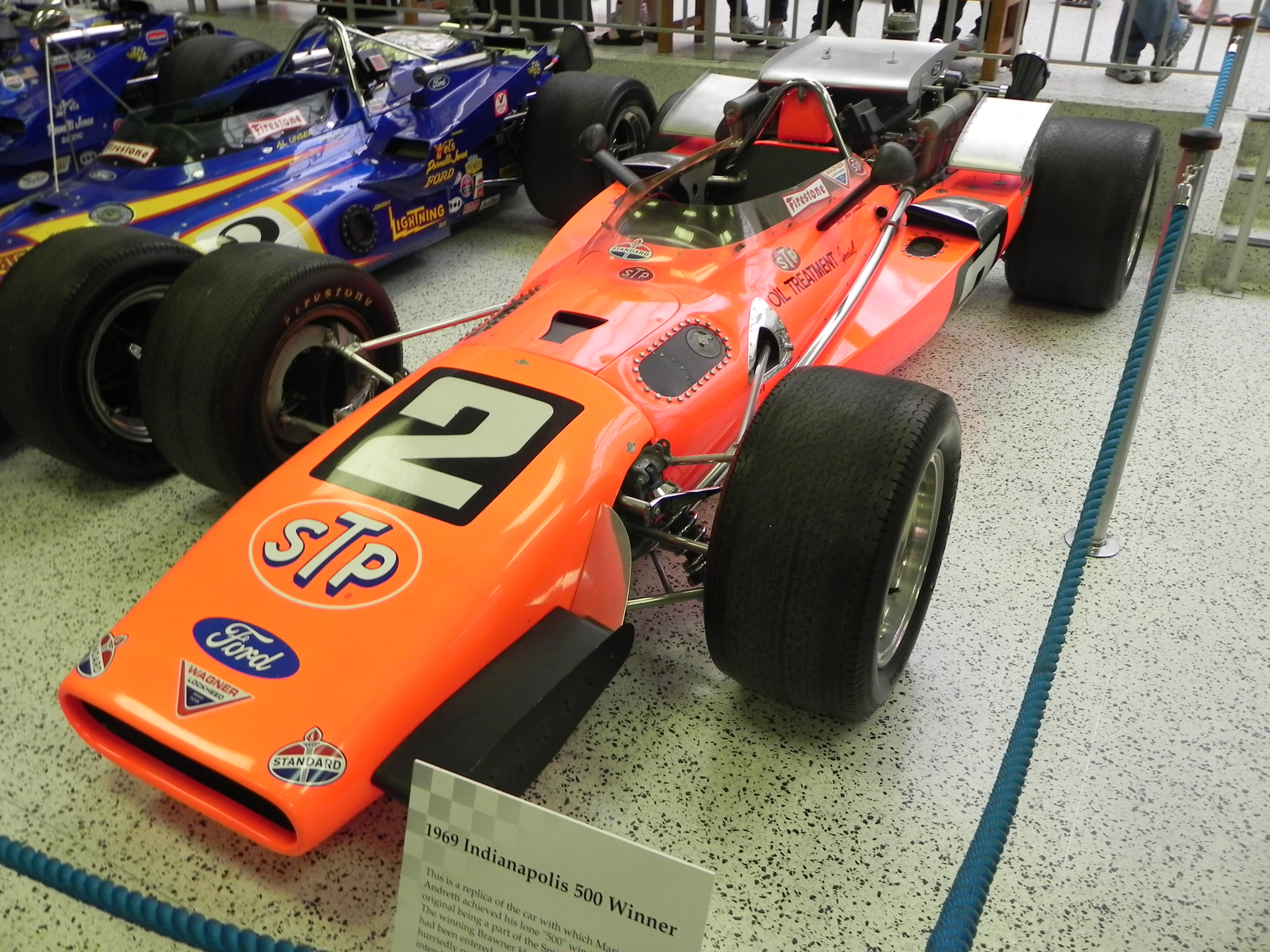
Mario Andretti's winning car at the 1969 Indianapolis 500.

1969: Mario Andretti's owner Al Dean (of the well-known Dean Vans Lines Specials) had died in 1967, and the team eventually became associated with Andy Granatelli for the 1969 season. Veteran chief mechanic Clint Brawner, along with younger up-and-coming mechanic Jim McGee were both still part of the effort. Granatelli had suffered heartbreaking misfortune in 1967 and 1968 with the Turbine-powered machines. In both years, his cars failed to finish within sight of victory. For 1969, he abandoned the Turbine program. During practice, Mario wrecked the revolutionary four-wheel drive Lotus, suffering burns to his face. The crash was caused by a right-rear hub failure. The team rolled out a back-up car, the year-old Brawner-Hawk. A week later, Mario qualified the Hawk in the middle of the front row. Due to his burns, his twin brother Aldo stood in for him for qualifying pictures. Despite the incident, serious concerns about overheating problems, and a gearbox losing oil, Mario went on to win the race in impressive fashion. Aldo, however, was not as fortunate, as less than three months later, he suffered a severely fractured face in a career-ending sprint car accident. In victory lane, an ecstatic Andy Granatelli rushed to greet his winner. After several years of heartbreak, he grabbed the victorious Mario and planted a kiss on his cheek. Mario went on to win the 1969 USAC Championship, his third title in five years.

1970: Following the 1969 victory, a feud erupted inside the team. For 1970 the team was sold outright to Andy Granatelli. Mario's chief mechanic, veteran Clint Brawner was promptly fired. Andretti and the younger, up-and-coming mechanic Jim McGee stayed on with Granatelli. It has been suggested that this ugly divorce within the team was the impetus of the curse, as allegedly, Brawner's wife Kay subsequently put a hex on Andretti. During a practice run on May 11, Mario Andretti crashed coming out of turn four. A universal joint yoke failed on his McNamara, and he hit the inside wall down the mainstretch. The car was badly damaged, but Andretti was unhurt. He would be forced to qualify in a back-up car. On pole day, gusty winds kept his speeds down, and with only 35 laps of practice in the car, he qualified for the dreaded "8-ball spot." (8th starting position was considered bad luck at the time; no driver had ever won the race from that grid position, and would not do so until 1985, see below). It was Andretti's worst qualifying result to-date. On race day, Andretti was attempting to become the first back-to-back winner since Bill Vukovich in 1953–1954. On about lap 31, Mario was forced to make an unscheduled pit stop due to loose bodywork. He rejoined the race, but lost many positions. Later on, he experienced handling problems with the right rear suspension, and had to make another unscheduled pit stop to change the right rear tire. It was not until lap 172 that his handling issues went away, but by then he was already a lap down and out of contention for the win. He led no laps, and finished in 6th place.

1971: On lap 12, Steve Krisiloff blew an engine, spewing oil on the track in turn three. Mel Kenyon spun in the oil, and crashed against the outside wall. Gordon Johncock and Mario Andretti came quickly upon scene. Johncock veered to miss Kenyon, and his car rode over top of Kenyon's car. Andretti spun trying to avoid the crash, and rammed into Johncock's car. Mario placed 30th.

1972: Mario Andretti joined the "Super Team" of Vel's Parnelli Jones Racing. Admittedly running a rich fuel mixture, the car ran out of fuel with 6 laps to go. Mario dropped to 8th place in the final standings.

1973: Rain delayed the start of the race, and at the start, a massive crash involving Salt Walther halted the race. Rain fell again, and two days later, the race finally got underway. Mario Andretti completed only 4 laps and dropped out with a bad piston. He placed 30th. Incidentally, Andy Granatelli, Mario's previous car owner, was the winning co-owner along with Pat Patrick. Andretti would later drive for Patrick in 1981–1982.

1974: Pole day was scheduled for Saturday May 11, but rain would interrupt the session. During practice, Mario Andretti was having trouble getting his Viceroy Parnelli up to speed, and considered switching to his backup car, an Eagle. At the qualifying draw, Mario picked 43rd in line for the Parnelli, but 21st in line for the Eagle, leading some to further conjecture he might try qualifying the Eagle. When rain closed the track for the day, Mario was left waiting in line, and had to wait until the second weekend of time trials to qualify. On the following Saturday, Mario rebounded, putting the Eagle in the middle of row two. On race day, Mario suffered yet another early drop out, completing only 2 laps. He dropped out with a bad valve, and placed 31st.

1975: Mario Andretti was racing full-time in Formula One in 1975, which created conflicts with the schedule at Indianapolis. Andretti missed pole day due as he was at Monaco, where he dropped out. Mario returned to qualify on the second weekend of time trials. He had the seventh-fastest speed, but as a third day qualifier, he would line up 27th. On race day, Mario suffered handling problems early on which sent him to the pits. While exiting the pits, the car stalled several times due to a clutch issue, and the crew had to pull the car back to its stall. The crew bled the clutch, which cost Mario nine minutes in the pits, and he lost several laps out on the track. On lap 68, a sudden mechanical failure sent his car crashing hard into the inside wall on the backstretch. Sid Collins, on the IMS Radio Network, even begun suggesting that bad luck had been following Andretti since his 1969 win. Mario skipped the Belgian Grand Prix to race at Indy.

1976: Mario Andretti was again running full-time in Formula One in 1976, but elects to race at Indianapolis once again, this time skipping Monaco. It was Mario's first of four starts with Penske Racing. The Belgian Grand Prix was the same weekend as pole day, therefore Mario was forced to qualify on the second weekend of time trials. Mario did not disappoint, posting the fastest qualifying speed of the month (189.404 mph), faster than polesitter Johnny Rutherford. However, as a third day qualifier, Mario would line up 19th. On race day, Mario charged to as high as 6th position, but slipped back and was not much of a factor after he started having handling problems. Mario was running a lap down in 8th place when the race was called for rain on lap 102.

1977: Another busy schedule saw Mario Andretti squeezing in Indianapolis during an off week of the Formula One schedule after Monaco. The weather cooperated on pole day, allowing Mario to qualify as scheduled, but engine issues prevented him from having a chance at the front row. After waving off his first attempt, Mario managed to qualify on the outside of row two. On race day, Mario dropped out after 47 laps with a broken header and placed 26th. In Formula One, however, Andretti placed 3rd in the championship. The World Champion in 1977 was Niki Lauda, despite Andretti having more wins that season.

1978: Mario squeezed in another attempt at Indianapolis during his full-time Formula One effort. Mario planned to qualify at Indianapolis during the first weekend of time trials (which was an off-week for Formula One). He was quickly up to speed during practice at Indy, running an "unofficial" track record of 203.482 mph. He went into the weekend as a favorite for the pole, but the first two days of time trials were rained out. He was forced to leave and go back to Europe for the Belgian Grand Prix. During the second weekend of time trials, Mike Hiss was drafted as a substitute, and qualified the car for Mario (he qualified 8th fastest). Mario himself won at Belgium. On race day, Mario got back in the cockpit and the car was moved to the back of the field due to the driver change. Only 19 laps into the race, Mario was forced to the pits due to a coil wire failure. He lost 8 laps while the team attempted to change spark plug wires. The team also believed they had suffered damaged valves. Mario was effectively out of contention very early on, and nursing a sour engine the rest of the day, he finished the race 15 laps down. However, he was able to make up for this by winning the 1978 Formula One World Championship after finishing third in 1977, behind South African Driver Jody Scheckter and Austrian driver Niki Lauda, who finished 2nd and 1st in 1977 respectively.

1979: The Monaco Grand Prix and Indianapolis were scheduled for the same day, therefore Mario was forced to skip the 1979 Indianapolis 500. It was the first time he had missed the race since arriving as a rookie in 1965. During the decade of the 1970s (1970–1979), Mario did not manage to lead a single lap in the 500.

1980: No date conflict in 1980 allowed Mario Andretti to return to Indianapolis again during a Formula One off-week. His results were much of the same though. After leading 10 laps early in the race, going into turn one on lap 71, the engine quit. Mario was running third at the time, but dropped out and finished 20th. It was his final start at Indy for car owner Roger Penske.

1981: Driving for Pat Patrick, Mario finished 2nd in the 1981 race, five seconds behind former teammate and winner Bobby Unser. In what would become one of the most controversial races in Indy history, Unser was stripped of the victory the following day when the official results were posted. Unser was penalized for passing cars under a caution flag, and Mario Andretti was declared the winner. It was (tentatively) Mario's long-awaited second Indy victory. Unser and his car owner Roger Penske protested the decision, and a lengthy and contentious appeals process dragged out through the summer. In October 1981, a USAC appeals panel voted to overturn the penalty, and restored Unser as the winner. Mario Andretti was reinstated back to second place, and his reign as a two-time winner of the 500 lasted only four months.

1982: Mario returned full-time to CART, remaining with Patrick racing. At the start, Mario was tangled up in the infamous crash triggered by Kevin Cogan replacing the then retired de facto defending champion Bobby Unser for car owner Roger Penske. Mario was out of the race before the green flag, while his Patrick Racing teammate Gordon Johncock went on to win by a margin of 0.16 seconds, the closest finish in Indy 500 history to that point against Cogan's teammate Rick Mears who had the fastest car all month long. Three minutes after the wreck, Andretti was heard saying "This is what happens when you have children doing a man's job up front." He got into a shoving match with Cogan.

1983: Mario Andretti joined the new Newman/Haas Racing team, with co-owners Carl Haas and Paul Newman. On lap 82, Johnny Parsons went too low in turn one, and spun in front of Mario. The two cars tangled, and both crashed hard into the outside wall. Neither driver was seriously injured. Mario placed 22nd, the second year in a row he was taken out in a crash.

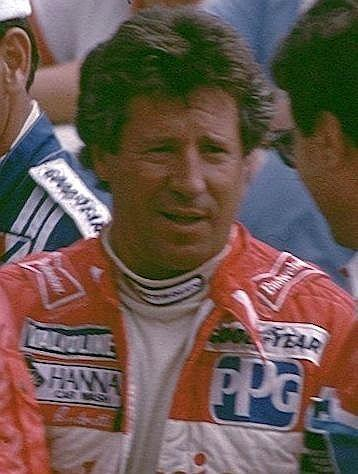
Andretti in 1984

1984: On his first qualifying lap, Mario set a one-lap track record, and appeared on his way to a front row starting position. On the fourth and final qualifying lap, his car quit coming off of turn four, and he coasted across the finish line. His average speed dropped to 6th on the starting grid, and he would line up behind his son Michael. On race day, Mario was in contention to win most of the afternoon, but a broken exhaust pipe was causing his engine to lose rpms. On lap 154, he came into the pits for a routine stop, but Josele Garza cut in front of him down the pit lane. The two cars made contact, and damaged Mario's nose cone. The car was too damaged to continue, and he was out of the race (17th finishing position).

1985: One of the most electrifying moments in Indy history came at the expense of Mario Andretti. Danny Sullivan, driving for car owner Roger Penske, passed Mario for the lead in turn one on the 120th lap, but immediately spun into a 360. Andretti somehow avoided contact and regained the lead, while Sullivan managed to keep the car off the wall and drove away. Both drivers pitted under the ensuing caution. About 20 laps later, Sullivan passed Mario again, this time cleanly, to go on for the win. Mario was a pre-race favorite, and had described the 1985 race as his "best chance to win" perhaps in his career, but managed only a disappointing, and somewhat distant, 2nd place. Sullivan broke a separate 68-year 'curse' by winning from the so-called "8 ball spot" (8th starting position), the first driver ever to do so. Mario failed to win himself from the dreaded 8-ball spot back in 1970. Earlier in the month, Mario was a favorite to win the pole position after a practice lap of 215.6 mph. On pole day morning, he turned a practice lap of 214 mph. But in time trials, he had to settle for a disappointing 211.576 mph run (good enough for 4th starting position). A stiff breeze in turn three, and a quick rise in temperature from the morning, slowed his run.

1986: Mario was among the favorites for the front row, but on the morning of pole day the car began suffering handling problems. His qualifying run was disappointing, as the car was loose. Mario managed to qualify 5th, and was beat by his son Michael who qualified 3rd. Four days later during a practice run, Mario badly wrecked the car in turn three. Something broke in the right rear, sending the car into a hard spin, and it hit the outside wall with the right side. Mario suffered lacerations to the left heel and abrasions to both knees, but no major injuries. The car was sent to England for repairs but it was too damaged to return in time. On race day, Mario drove a backup car, and was forced to move to the rear of the field. His day was over very early on as the car coasted to a halt on lap 9. He was towed to the pits where the crew changed the spark box and battery. The car still was lacking power, and he dropped out on lap 19, placing 32nd.

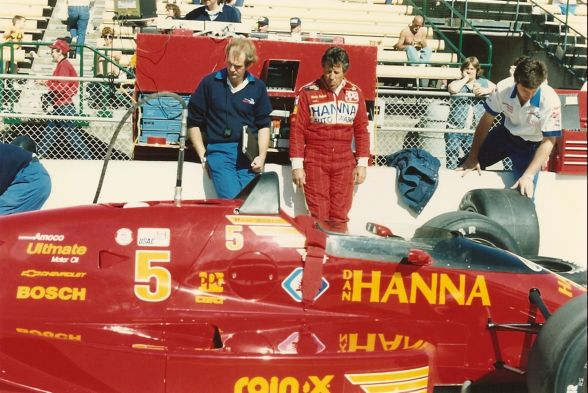
Mario Andretti waits by his car during a practice session at the 1987 Indianapolis 500.

1987: Mario dominated the 1987 event, and in fact, the entire month of May. He won the pole position, the pit stop contest, and led the daily practice speed chart nearly every day he took practice laps. Driving the new Ilmor Chevy Indy V-8, He led 170 of the first 177 laps, giving up the lead only during pit stop sequences. He had such a big lead that he backed off, but the reduced revs created a harmonic imbalance in the engine. A valve spring broke with only 23 laps to go, and the car coasted to a stop. It was considered one of his most shocking defeats. As a cruel ironic side note here, Roberto Guerrero inherited the lead after Mario went out, drove for Andy Granatelli's son Vince in an STP sponsored car, his final pitstop had problems with results of him finishing 2nd to Al Unser Sr. whose car owner was Roger Penske.

1988: Mario was the fastest driver during practice all week, leading the charts at 221.565 mph. On the morning of pole day, he drove a practice lap of 220.372 mph, second only to Rick Mears (222.827 mph). Mario drew the coveted first qualifying attempt, but his qualifying speed was curiously slow, inconsistent, and disappointing (214.692 mph). He claims to have hit a patch of oil-dry in turn four, which was laid down that morning due to a crash by Raul Boesel. On race day, his car was plagued with problems. About 30 laps into the race, a gearbox bearing failed and created an oil leak. A long pit stop was needed to make repairs. Later in the race, an ignition problem forced another series of long pit stops to change various electrical components. With the leaders passed lap 170, Mario was about 50 laps down when the team finally called the day quits with a dead engine. Mario was credited with 118 laps in 20th place.

1989: Mario Andretti qualified 5th and led the race on lap 35, but soon began experiencing mechanical issues. On lap 90, Mario was forced to the pits to diagnose a throttle problem. After a four-minute pit stop to make repairs, and after losing several laps, Mario returned to the track. Mario charged through the field, and found himself running 4th at the finish, albeit 7 laps down, which is considered an unusually large deficit for fourth place in the modern era. The 1989 race marked the first year he was teamed-up with his son Michael, who blew an engine while leading.

1990: In his milestone 25th Indy start, Mario Andretti was running as high as third until his second pit stop. He pitted on lap 46 with a punctured tire, but as he was exiting the pits, the caution flag came out, and he lost a lap. On lap 60, he dropped out with a blown engine, finishing 27th.

1991: Late in the race, Mario Andretti was running in the top five, although a few laps down. On lap 188, Mario's son Michael Andretti took the lead in dramatic fashion on a restart, passing Rick Mears who was driving for car owner Roger Penske, on the outside of turn one. One lap later, Mears pulled the same move, and re-took the lead for himself. Mears began to pull away, and Michael's hopes for victory began to fade. Suddenly Mario coasted to a stop at the entrance to the pits, bringing out the caution. A mild controversy emerged when observers speculated that Mario had stopped on purpose to help Michael. The field bunched up under the yellow, which gave Michael one last chance to challenge for the win. Mears held off Michael for the win, and the controversy eventually fizzled.

1992: At the start, Mario and his son Michael led the field into the first turn. Michael came around in first, and Mario already a somewhat distant second. On the 5th lap, a caution came out. Mario ducked into the pits with a misfire. After several pit stops, the problem was fixed and he returned to the track, but dropped down the standings a lap down. Later in the race, Mario pitted for tires, and cross-threaded a wheel nut. He was again shuffled down in the running order. A few moments later, on a restart, he crashed in turn four. He was among several front-runners to crash due to cold tires on the unusually cold afternoon. Mario suffered broken toes, and was taken to Methodist Hospital in downtown Indianapolis for surgery. A short time later, Mario's son Jeff shattered both of his legs in a terrible crash, and was also taken to the hospital. Both required considerable rehabilitation, although Jeff's was significantly more severe. Back at the track, Mario's other son Michael was dominating the race, and looked poised to win. However, with 11 laps to go, his car quit, and he was out of the race. Ironically, the rival Unser family prevailed over the dismayed Andrettis yet again, with Al Unser Jr. winning and Al Unser Sr. finishing third. In his autobiography Andretti, Mario described the day, which saw him laid up in a hospital bed, witnessing his youngest son's serious injury, and then woke up to hear the news that his other son Michael had lost, as the "worst day of my life."

1993: The 1993 race was Andretti's last notable run, and he had just come off a victory at Phoenix. On pole day, Andretti was the first car to complete a qualifying run, and sat on the provisional pole position. Mario's speed held up all afternoon, but with less than an hour to go, Arie Luyendyk topped his speed, and took the pole. On race day, Mario was a factor most of the afternoon, leading the most laps (72). While leading on lap 134, Mario was penalized for entering the pits while they were closed. A stop-and-go penalty dropped him only down to second place. In the final 50 laps, he began developing handling problems because of his tires, and slid down the standings to finish 5th behind eventual winner Emerson Fittipaldi who was driving for car owner Roger Penske. Fittipaldi's win ended two Indy jinxes: it was the first to come from the 9th starting position and the first win for car #4 in a year not ending with 0.

1994: Mario's last race at Indy. He entered with much fanfare through his "Arrivederci Mario" tour. His race was very short though, and he dropped out early due to mechanical problems.

2003: On April 23, 2003, in the lead up to the 2003 Indy 500, Mario took to the track for the first time in ten years in a major open wheel car. He participated in a test session for son Michael's AGR IndyCar team. One of the team's regular drivers, Tony Kanaan, suffered a radial fracture of his arm on April 15 a crash a week earlier at Motegi. If Kanaan was not cleared to drive in enough time, tentative plans were being prepared for Mario to qualify the car for him. He would turn the car over to Kanaan on race day. No plans had yet been made though for Mario to actually drive in the race.

During the test session, it was noted by many observers that despite his lack of experience in modern Indy cars (which had changed substantially since his retirement) and his advanced age (63), he quickly reached competitive speed. He was quickly over 212 mph, and looked "as if he had never been away." The success of the testing caused growing speculation during the afternoon that Mario may even attempt to qualify for the race.

With only 2 minutes left in the day, Kenny Bräck crashed in turn one, and the yellow light came one. Mario entered turn one at full speed, and struck debris on the track from Bräck's car. The object, identified by most as the rear wing, forced the nose of Mario's car to become airborne, and the car went into a rapid double reverse somersault at speeds exceeding 200 miles per hour. Television footage from the WTHR helicopter-cam showed that the car clipped the top of the debris fence, and was nearly high enough to go over it. The car fell back to the ground, slowed by its mid-air tumble, and slid to a stop. Luckily, the car landed right side up and Andretti walked away from the crash with very minor injuries.

Mario initially shrugged off the accident and still contemplated returning to qualify the car in May. A day later, however, he reconsidered, and has not climbed back into a race car in a competitive setting. This was Mario's last significant on-track activity at Indianapolis to date, aside from driving the IndyCar two-seater exhibition car.

Mario Andretti — Indianapolis 500 misfortunes
Description	Years
Crashes	1967 (lost wheel), 1969 (practice), 1970 (practice), 1971, 1975, 1982, 1983, 1986 (practice), 1992, 2003 (testing)
Mechanical/engine failure	1966, 1967, 1968, 1972 (ran out of fuel), 1973, 1974, 1977, 1980, 1984, 1987, 1988, 1990, 1991, 1994
Led most laps without winning	1985, 1987, 1993

From 1911 to 1968, the 2nd starting position statistically produced the most race winners (nine total), more than even the pole position (which had produced only seven at that time). In his lone 1969 victory, Mario drove car #2, from the 2nd starting position. It was the tenth time a driver had won the Indianapolis 500 from the 2nd starting position. It would take until the end of the twentieth century for another driver win from the 2nd starting position. In fact, few cars even managed to finish the race from the 2nd starting position during that period. As of 2018, only one driver (Juan Pablo Montoya in 2000) has won from the second starting position since Andretti did so in 1969.

=== 24 Hours of Le Mans ===
Mario Andretti's run of bad luck also extends to his many attempts at Le Mans, which began with his 1966 debut, sharing a Holman & Moody Ford MKII with Lucien Bianchi, as they had been at the top 10, their car dropped a valve at 10:30 pm, causing them to retire. Further bad luck continued for the 1967 race, as he was driving, his front brake locked, causing him to crash his Holman & Moody Ford MKIV at the Esses, his teammates, Jo Schlesser and Roger McCluskey driving MKIIB GT40s attempted to avoid Andretti's GT40 and crashed, but managed to avoid his car. McCluskey managed to pull Andretti to safety, which he had to be taken to hospital. Mario would not return to the French classic until the end of his F1 career in 1982 with an enormous fanfare, partnering with son Michael in a Mirage M12 Ford. Despite having qualified 9th place, the pair found their car being removed from the starting grid 80 minutes before the start of the race, as an official discovered an oil cooler that was mounted behind the gearbox, contravening the rules, despite managing to pass initial scrutineering four days prior. Despite protests and complaints, the Andretti's entry was removed altogether, replaced by a Porsche 924 Carrera GTR. Despite a formal complaint, team owner Harley Cluxton, who took over the Mirage name from original founder John Wyer, would never return to the race again.

Mario and Michael's return for the following year was more successful as they finished third as well as their return in 1988 with John Andretti which they finished 6th in a factory Porsche 962. Following Mario's retirement from full-time racing, he decided to return to Le Mans for another chance at adding a le Mans victory to his achievements in 1995. While showing potential to win the race, a number of disorganized mishaps, including being pulled over to the pits at the closing period while leading the race to clear grime off the car to make the sponsor's decal visible, resulted in a 2nd place. His efforts for the following years proved to be unsuccessful with a 13th place for 1996 and a DNF for 1997. His final appearance was in 2000 when he managed to finish 15th.

== Michael Andretti and Andretti Autosport ==
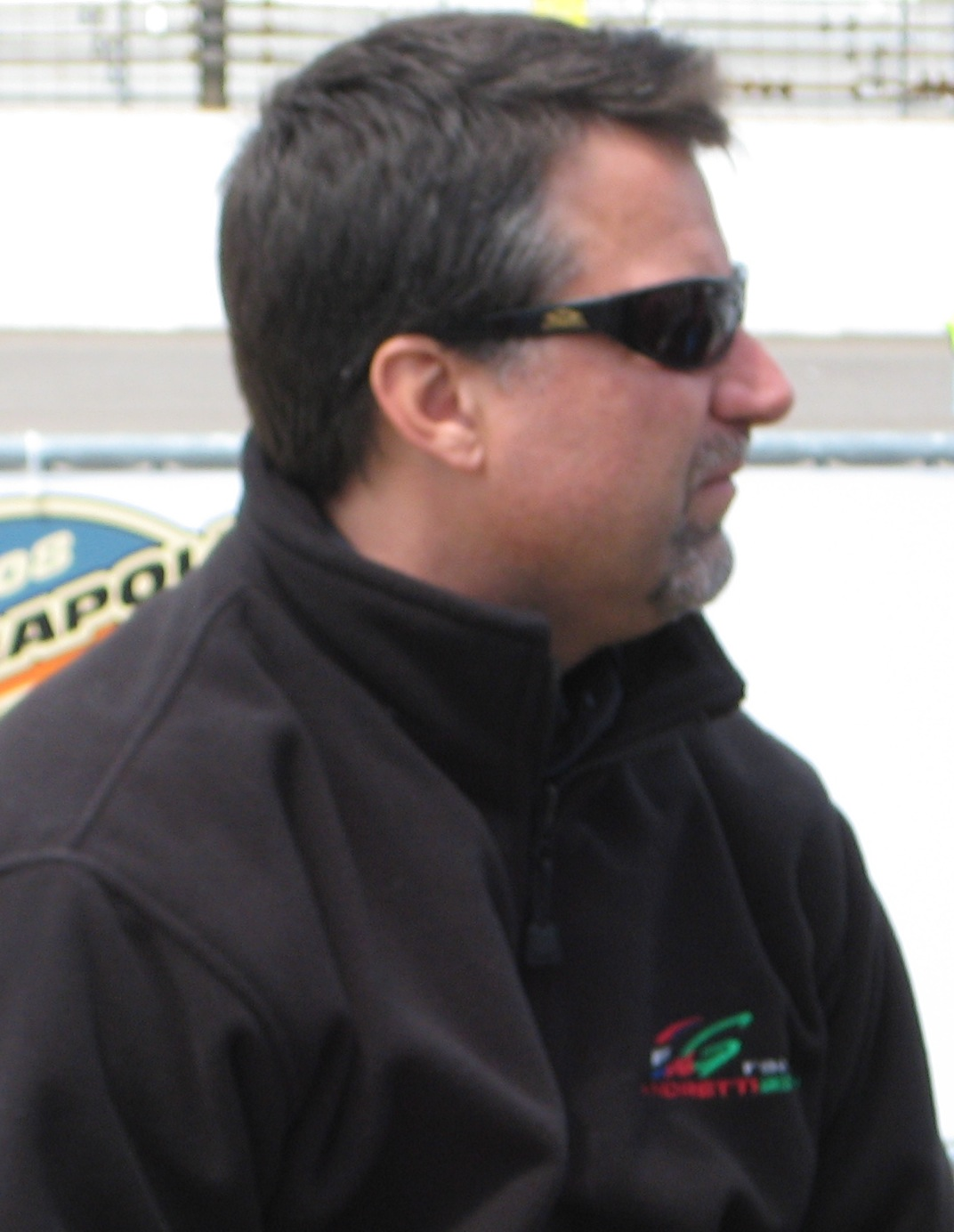
Andretti at the Indianapolis Motor Speedway in May 2008.

Michael is the son of Mario and has also suffered from the curse. Despite a successful racing career including a CART championship (1991), two wins at the Michigan 500, and a total of 42 Indy car wins, he was unsuccessful in 16 attempts at winning the Indianapolis 500. He has completed the most laps, as well as led the most laps, of any driver who has never won the famous race. He is considered by some the best driver never to have won. Unlike Mario, on average Michael seldom dropped out early, and was in contention numerous times. His career was peppered with more near-misses than out-and-out failures. Furthermore, the years he dropped out were almost exclusively due to mechanical failures; only once did he drop out from wall contact.

1984: Michael Andretti starts his career at Indianapolis on a positive note driving for Kraco Enterprises with crew chief Barry Green, starting 4th, finishing 5th and sharing the Rookie of the Year award with Roberto Guerrero.

1985: During practice on May 8, Michael blew an engine and spun in his own oil, crashing in turn one. He recovered to out-qualify his teammate Kevin Cogan, but both cars are mid-packers at best. On race day, Michael finished 8th, four laps down, not as good as his rookie debut. Later in the year, Michael and Cogan are involved in a helicopter crash, but survive.

1986: Michael out-qualifies his father Mario and starts on the outside of the front row. He proceeds to lead the first 42 laps, and is among the fastest cars on the track. A bad set of tires caused handling problems in the second half of the race and he is forced to pit early, slightly out-of-sequence with the other leaders. Right after he pit, a caution came out, and Michael fell a lap down. Back on the lead lap, and clinging to 4th position, just shy of being lapped, he is forced to the pits for a splash-and-go pit stop on lap 193. The caution came out moments later, he fell a lap down again, and dropped to 6th at the finish.

1987: Early on in the race, a pit fire halts his run. He ultimately drops out because a CV joint fails. Later in the year, Michael wins at the Michigan 500.

1988: With only a few laps remaining, a piece of bodywork falls off his car, bringing out the yellow, and forcing the race to finish under caution. Driving the now-aging Cosworth DFX proved to be a horsepower disadvantage, as Michael was unable to keep up with the Chevrolet Indy V-8's as well as the Buicks, particularly down the long straights. However, he still managed a 4th place, owing to the numerous yellows (14) which kept the field bunched up.

1989: Michael joins his father at Newman/Haas Racing. Michael qualifies in the pole round, but his time is disallowed for being 4.5 pounds underweight. He is forced to qualify as a second-day qualifier, and starts deep in the field. In one of his better races to date, Michael works his way to the lead in the second half. After leading 35 laps, his engine blew on the mainstretch just past the 400-mile mark. Despite losing at Indy again, in August, Michael wins his second Michigan 500.

1990: Early in the race, a brake fire causes Michael to lose considerable time in the pits. He eventually dropped out with a vibration.

1991: Michael leads 97 laps, later saying in 2011, "I really didn't think that anybody had anything for me at that point. I was ready to put Rick a lap down and his day would have been over, and I get a flat tire, so I had to come into the pits right away, and that's the thing that changed the race." With 18 laps to go, he leads Rick Mears by 15 seconds, but needs to make one final pit stop for fuel. A timely caution flag flies and he loses minimal ground as he pits under the yellow. On the ensuing restart with 13 laps to go, he makes a daring pass on the outside in turn one to grab the lead from Mears. On the very next lap, Mears steals the thunder as he makes exactly the same counter-move and quickly pulls out to a lead. Moments later, Michael's father Mario suddenly coasts to a stop at the entrance to the pits. The yellow flag flies again, and bunches up the field. Many accused Mario of stopping on purpose in a ploy to aid his son. Whatever the case, the point was moot as Mears, driving for car owner Roger Penske, pulls away to the victory. Michael settled for second, later saying in 2011, "I really thought that we had it cause we had dominated the race and I still til this day don't understand where Rick got that speed." This race was the first to feature four Andrettis, (Mario, Michael, Jeff, and John). Michael went on to win the 1991 CART championship.

1992: Michael dominates the 1992 race, leading 160 of the first 189 laps. With only 11 laps to go he was leading by over half a lap. His fuel pump suddenly failed and he coasted to a stop. He settles for 13th place. After the race, he visits his father and brother, both sent to the hospital.

1993: Michael sits out the 1993 event, due to his now ill-fated participation in Formula One.

1994: Michael returned to the CART series and Indianapolis for 1994 driving for car owner Chip Ganassi. On lap 41, he suffered a flat tire, and nearly crashed into the wall. He was forced to limp back to the pits to change tires, and lost a lap to the field. He ran the rest of the day off-sequence with the leaders, but climbed back up to the top five. He finished third on the track, but officials ruled that he passed cars illegally under a caution on lap 190. Officials were about to put out the black flag and issue him a stop-and-go penalty, but another caution came out for the crash of Stan Fox. The race ended up finishing under yellow, so USAC instead issued him a 1-lap penalty for the infraction. He dropped from 3rd to 6th in the final standings.

1995: While leading on the 77th lap, Michael approaches lap traffic and brushes the wall in turn four. His suspension is too damaged to continue, and he finishes 25th.

1996-2000: Due to the CART/IRL Open Wheel "Split", Michael Andretti did not compete at Indy. Meanwhile, he remained a top competitor on the CART circuit, finishing second in points in 1996, and winning at least one race per year over that time.

2001: Michael follows suit with other CART teams and returns to race at Indianapolis. He leads 16 laps, and is leading the race during a rain delay just beyond the halfway point. Had the race been halted due to the rain, he could have been declared the winner. The red flag, however, does not come out at the time and the race resumes. A punctured tire, and a minor collision in the pits with eventual winner Hélio Castroneves, driving for car owner Roger Penske, slow him down, and at the end of the day, Michael settles for 3rd place.

2002: Nearing the end of his full-time driving career, Michael is not much of a factor, starting 15th and finishing 7th.

2003: A highly publicized "final start" at Indianapolis sees Michael a race favorite. After financial troubles in CART, Michael purchased majority ownership of Team Green and renamed it Andretti Green Racing. After leading 28 laps, Michael drops out of his final race before the halfway point, much like his father in 1994.

2004: Now a full-time owner, Andretti's team quickly became one of the top organizations in the Indy Racing League, and proved to be very competitive at Indy. Rain shortens the 2004 race, however, and Andretti's team finds itself in a notable but frustrating result of finishing 2nd-3rd-4th.

2005: Andretti's team breaks through as Dan Wheldon wins. After Wheldon's win, Andretti tells the media, "No more curse" as he shares in the milk celebration. Sitting on the sidelines, however, proved to be motivating, and in December, Michael announced he would come out of retirement to race in 2006 with his son Marco. Wheldon would go on to win the 2005 IndyCar championship, but during the offseason, defected to rival Chip Ganassi Racing.

2006: In December 2005, Michael announced he would come out of retirement to race with his son Marco at Indy in 2006. Michael was an also-ran most of the day, but managed to stay on the lead lap all day. During a caution on lap 160, Michael (along with Sam Hornish Jr.) ducked in to the pits to top of his fuel, in hopes of going the rest of the race without another stop. After the leaders sequenced through yellow flag pit stops, Andretti remarkably inherited the lead on lap 194. The race went back to green with 4 laps to go with Michael leading, and his son Marco behind him in second place. A lap later, Michael is quickly overtaken by Marco, who appears on his way to victory in his first race. Michael attempts some mild blocking, in order to protect his son's lead, but he is quickly passed by Sam Hornish Jr., driving for long-time rival car owner Roger Penske, Marco ends up losing the lead on the final straightaway to the finish line, and the father and son Andrettis settle for 2nd and 3rd.

2007: In the wake of the 2006 near-miss, Michael returns for yet another encore, but experiences little success behind the wheel. He led one lap during a sequence of pit stops, but finished a lowly 13th. After the frustration, and in an effort to concentrate on his team cars, Michael announces he will again retire from driving. Meanwhile, the day was not a total disappointment, as Andretti-Green team driver Dario Franchitti was victorious. It was Michael Andretti's second Indy win as an owner. Franchitti went on to win the 2007 IndyCar championship, but just like Dan Wheldon two years earlier, defected to Ganassi - first as part of the Ganassi NASCAR team, then later with the IndyCar outfit.

2010: The Andretti Autosport team struggled during qualifying, but managed to put all five cars safely in the field. Tony Kanaan wrecked twice in two days, finally putting his car in the field in 32nd. On race day, Kanaan charged from the rear of the field to run as high as second, but wound up 11th. Andretti team cars had two cars finish in the top six.

2011: The entire five-car Andretti Autosport team struggled to get up to speed at Indy - the second year in a row that has occurred. After putting only one car in the field on pole day, the team was faced with finding enough speed to get its other four cars qualified. As bump day wound to its conclusion, team driver Mike Conway exhausted his three attempts and was too slow to qualify. Marco Andretti found himself on the bubble, and Ryan Hunter-Reay was the second slowest. Marco was ultimately bumped, but was able to make one last effect to qualify. However, Marco was faced with the situation of missing the race, or bumping out his teammate. When time trials closed, Marco was in and Hunter-Reay was out. A day later, a deal was made with Foyt Racing to put Hunter-Reay in as Foyt's second driver - a move that was deemed very unpopular by fans.

2013: After being out in front in contention throughout the entire race with three of their drivers, rookie Carlos Muñoz, defending Indycar Series Champion Ryan Hunter-Reay and Marco Andretti, all three still weren't able to surpass KV Racing Technology and former Andretti Autosport driver and 2004 Series Champion, Tony Kanaan, for the victory. This once again left Andretti Autosport for the second time after doing so in 2004, finishing 2nd-3rd-4th.

2014: Michael Andretti won his third Indy 500 as an owner with driver Ryan Hunter-Reay as Carlos Muñoz finished 4th and Rookie Of The Year, Kurt Busch finished 6th.

2016: Michael Andretti won his fourth Indy 500 as an owner with rookie driver Alexander Rossi. However once again, Carlos Muñoz unfortunately finished second. The second runner-up finish for him along with his third top-4 finish in just 4 attempts.

2017: Michael Andretti won his fifth Indy 500 as an owner with driver Takuma Sato. At the conclusion of the season, Sato departed Andretti Autosport and returned to Rahal Letterman Lanigan Racing after once driving for them in 2012.

Indianapolis 500 - Races involved in crashes

- 1985 (practice), 1995 (brushed wall)

Indianapolis 500 - Races suffering mechanical/engine failure

- 1987 (pit fire), 1989, 1990, 1992, 1994 (flat tire), 2003

Indianapolis 500 - Races leading the most laps without winning

- 1991, 1992

== Marco Andretti ==
Marco is the son of Michael and the grandson of Mario. He has qualified for the Indy 500 twenty times.

2005 Indy Pro Series: Marco's first trip to Indianapolis saw him finish 16th, two laps down, in the 2005 Freedom 100 for the Indy Pro Series. Marco achieved the first Andretti win at the Brickyard of any sort since 1969 by winning the 2005 Liberty Challenge Indy Pro Series race on the infield road course three weeks later.

2006: Marco joined his father's Andretti Green Racing IndyCar Series team for 2006. His first Indy 500 saw him narrowly miss a historic victory. A crash by Felipe Giaffone instigated a caution period on lap 191. Marco's father Michael took the lead on lap 194 under caution when cars ahead of him made pit stops. At this stage, Marco was immediately behind his father in second place. One lap after returning to green-flag racing, Marco put a passing move on his father and took the lead, seemingly on the way to victory. However Sam Hornish Jr., recovering from a penalty earlier in the race, was closing quickly.

Michael attempted to block Hornish as much as possible for his son, but Hornish got by and drove up behind Marco with 2 laps to go. Marco held Hornish off as long as possible, however Hornish managed a last gasp pass in the last 400 feet before the finish line winning by 0.0635 seconds. It was the second-closest finish in the history of the Indy 500, behind only the 1992 race. Many consider this to be the saddest event in Michael Andretti's racing history, with a father-son 1st-2nd finish being spoiled by Hornish, driving for long-time rival car owner Roger Penske.

Third-place finisher Michael had high praise for his son: "I felt so bad for Marco, but I'm so proud. He drove a hell of a race. I drove with him a hell of a lot in that race. He drove like a champion. He drove like he's been out there 10 years." But Marco wanted more: "Second's nothing," he said. Clearly, the disappointment has not softened. "I took a lot of criticism for my reaction then," he says. "But I don't see much value in second place. I'm still bothered by it. I never lifted. If I had put my foot down any more, it would have gone through the floorboard. It was all about speed at the end, and I have no idea how they [Hornish's team] could have put up the numbers they did on that last lap. It's still fishy." He is asked what the Hornish team could have done. "There are things," he says. With that, the topic, still obviously a bad memory, is closed. August 20, 2020, "When I lost the 500 in 2006 you saw me mad because I knew that it's possible that 15 years later I'm talking to you guys and I haven't won one yet, so that's why I was so mad cause it's a tough place, I mean last year (2019) I had the worst race of my career and here we are we can win it."

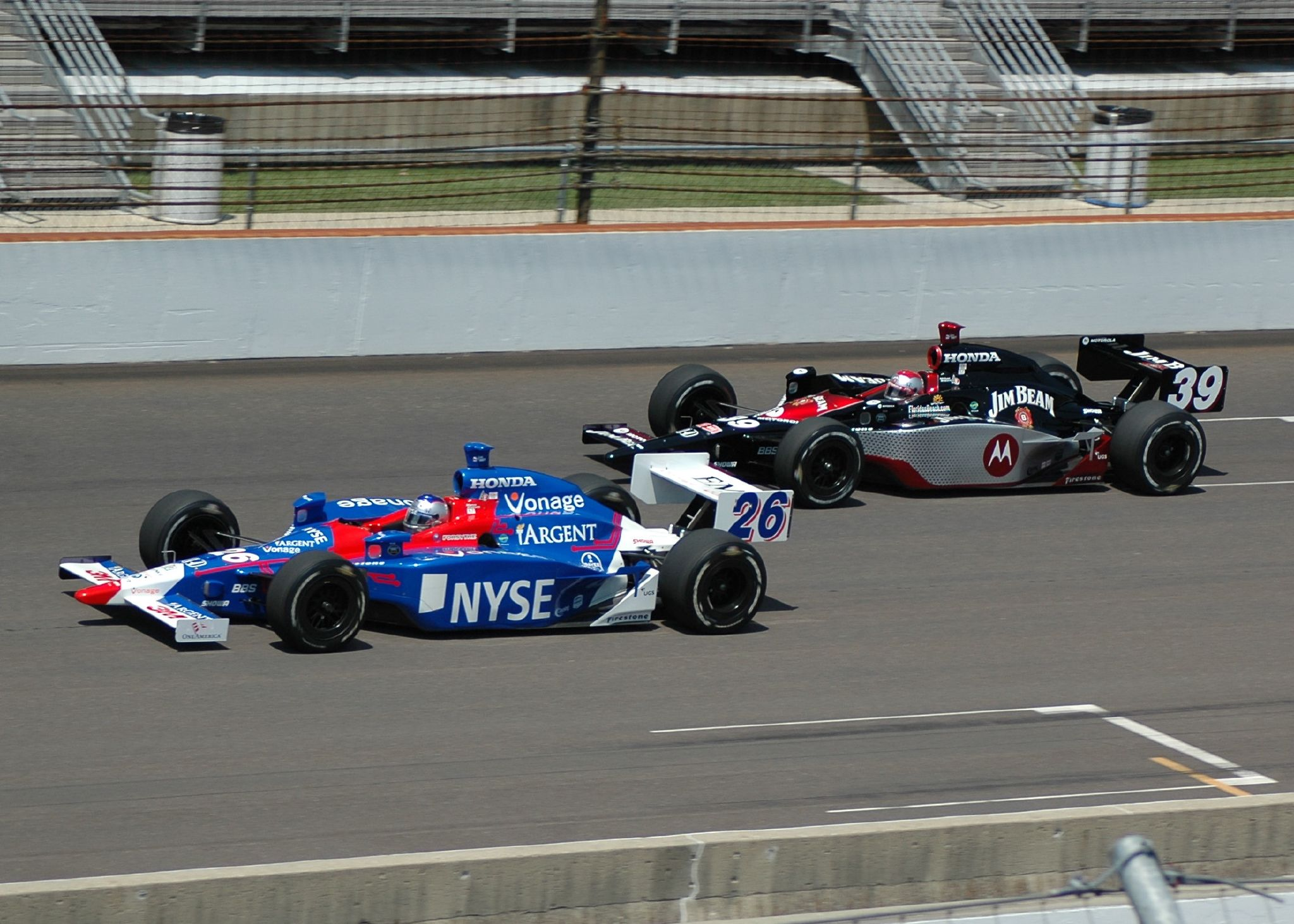
Marco Andretti (left) practicing with Michael Andretti at Indianapolis in 2007

2007: In a rain-interrupted race, Marco was a front runner for most of the afternoon. Marco took the lead on lap 102 during a caution, and rain was swiftly approaching the Speedway. Since the race was beyond the halfway point, if rain washed out the remained of the race, it could have been declared official. With the weather in mind, the restart on lap 107 could have decided the race. Tony Kanaan got the jump into turn 1 on the restart, and took the lead. The red flag came out for rain on lap 113 with Marco sitting in second place. Three hours later the track was dried, and the race resumed. Late in the race, Marco was involved in a spectacular crash with Dan Wheldon on the backstretch which eliminated him from competition. His car flipped upside down after making contact with Wheldon's wheel, slid to the infield, and then righted itself. Marco was unhurt. The race ended moments later when the rain returned.

2008: Returning for his third Indy 500, Marco posted the fastest practice speed of the month, 228.318 mph, the morning of pole day time trials. Initially a favorite for the front row, his qualifying effort, however, was a visibly disappointing 7th. On race day, Marco was a strong contender, and led in the second half, but was not without incident. On the 106th lap, Marco was battling for second and dove under teammate Tony Kanaan in the third turn. The move unsettled Kanaan's car, and Kanaan slid high and into the wall, then collected the car of Sarah Fisher. Marco was immediately blamed for the crash. While running second on lap 156, Marco pitted and the crew made a "trim" adjustment of his rear wing. The change shuffled him back to 4th, and rendered him uncompetitive for the final few laps. Marco settled for 3rd place.

2009: On the first lap of the race, Mario Moraes drifted to the outside and made contact with Andretti, sending both cars into the wall going into the second turn. Andretti was out of the race before completing a single lap. Neither driver was injured in the collision. But Andretti returned briefly later in the race. Moraes held the view that Andretti ran into him, and both drivers expressed their frustration to the TV crews. Andretti said that Moraes is "clueless," while Moraes believed that Andretti checked down on him.

2010: The entire Andretti Autosport team struggled to get up to speed during time trials, but Marco led the team with a team-best 16th starting position. On race day, he worked himself up to the top five late in the race. In the closing laps, Marco got shuffled up to 3rd place as drivers were running low on fuel and being forced to pit, with Marco's car containing barely enough fuel to make it to the finish. Marco slowed to laps in the high 190 mph-range, and coasted on fumes to the final lap. During the last lap, Marco was passed by Alex Lloyd, Scott Dixon and Danica Patrick under yellow resulting in him finishing in an unofficial 6th place. Several hours after the race, however, race officials reviewed the finish and Marco was restored to 3rd place.

2011: For the second year in a row, the entire Andretti Autosport team struggled to get up to speed during time trials. On Bump Day, Marco was bumped from the field, and was in danger of missing the field. He managed to get out on the track before the 6 o'clock gun, and successfully bumped his way into the field - but in the process, bumped out his teammate Ryan Hunter-Reay. On race day, he started 27th, and worked his way into the top ten. Marco was called into the pits to top off with fuel during a caution on lap 154, and to make a trim adjustment of the rear wing. The stop put Marco out of sequence with the other leaders, but ended up being a poor decision. Marco lost valuable track position when another caution came out 4 laps later, and the adjustments made his car difficult to handle. He ended up 9th.

2012: The Andretti Autosport cars were fast the whole month. On race day, Marco stormed to the lead and led 59 of the first 90 laps. He faded and eventually smacked the wall on lap 187, ending his run. He ended up a pitiful 24th after having the dominant car.

2013: Marco qualified for the outside of the front row and led a total of 31 laps. Running 4th on the final restart with four laps to go, Marco attempted to pass Carlos Munoz for third place. Munoz held off the challenge, as another caution came out, freezing the field and effectively ending the race. Marco placed 4th.

2014: Marco led 20 laps, and led as late as lap 182. Running in the top three in the waning laps, he was part of the three-car battle for the win along with Ryan Hunter-Reay and Helio Castroneves. Marco twice tried to make moves for second, but was held off both times, and finished 3rd.

2015: With Honda struggling in speed versus the Chevrolet entries, Marco was not a factor during qualifying, and was not much of a factor during the race. He finished 6th.

2016: Marco qualified a disappointing 14th. Marco never came close to contention and finished 13th after running as high as 10th. "Fun day until the front tires were put on the wrong side. Really bummed, the car was good. Unfortunate mistake but my guys are the best."

2017: The six-car Andretti Autosport effort had a very successful month, though Marco seemingly garnered the least amount of attention. He qualified 8th and finished 8th, enduring at one point a long pit stop to replace a damaged rear wing assembly.

2018: Marco switches to the #98 Honda to gain better results. In this race, Andretti started 12th, running as high as 6th with 50 to go with a pretty strong run until they lost the balance midway through the race. Marco did not led laps and dropped back to 12th place at the end of the run.

2019: Marco qualified 10th, but at the start immediately dropped to the back of the field with handling problems and an issue with the center of pressure. He was never a factor, finishing 26th with an ill handling car, 5 laps down. He drove the #98 Honda for Andretti Autosport/Curb-Agajanian Motorsports, the first time in Marco's career that he was listed as a team owner entrant, co-owning it with the Curb-Agajanian entry.

2020: Again driving for Andretti Autosport/Curb-Agajanian Motorsports in the #98 Honda, Marco set the fastest lap during "Fast Friday" practice at 233.491 mph, the fastest practice lap at Indy since 1996. Marco won the pole position with a speed of 231.068 mph. The achievement came 33 years after Mario won his third pole in 1987. It was the first Indy pole for Andretti Autosport since 2005. It was a day Marco Andretti will never forget. And yet, the glory was so short-lived. Carb Day came and quickly changed everything. Marco Andretti has not shared this story publicly before because of how he believes it will be perceived and reflect on the team. But he was asked for the truth, and though at first he hesitated, he eventually relented. Here is what he thinks went wrong: The team changed out the engine for Carb Day. He says that he went on track, did one run, decided the car was about 1.5 mph slower than before and begged his bosses to put the old engine back in. The manufacturer tested both engines and did not find any difference. The team told him there was no car speed problem and furthermore, did not want to incur a potential penalty for swapping out engines again. "Nobody wanted to believe me, including the high-ups here," Marco Andretti said. "I said, 'We're done. If you don’t put that other engine in, We're out.' ... We were the dominant car until that change was made. I just felt like I wasn't listened to for the amount of experience 15 years should be listened to." On race day, Marco is a non-factor, falling back to 13th place on the lead lap, he completed all 500 miles, leading no laps.

2021: Once again driving for Andretti Autosport/Curb-Agajanian Motorsports in the #98 Honda, Marco started 25th, finished 19th and is never a factor, completing all 500 miles, leading no laps. Marco stated that he ran too trimmed and a late race vibration costed him more pace.

2022: Yet again driving for Andretti Autosport/Curb-Agajanian Motorsports in the #98 Honda, Marco started 23rd, he's not a factor. Climbed up quietly up to 12th place until a pit stop under caution set him at the back of the field. Late in the race, Marco led 3 laps from lap 185 to 187, his first since 2014, now 8/17 overall for 144 total, while drivers ahead of him made their final green flag pit stops, he finishes 22nd as last car on the lead lap and completes all 500 miles.

2023: And again driving for Andretti Autosport/Curb-Agajanian Motorsports in the #98 Honda, Marco started a disappointing 24th after posting the 2nd fastest lap on "Fast Friday" practice at 234.202 mph, the 2nd fastest ever, Marco's fastest lap ever and fastest since his 2020 pole position run, he finished 17th as last car on the lead lap, is never a factor, completing all 500 miles and leading no laps. Late in the race, Marco is involved in a crash with Christian Lundgaard, Ed Carpenter, Graham Rahal and Benjamin Pedersen, where he was the only driver able to continue on with the race.

2024: Marco starts 19th for his 19th start. After a quiet race in the middle of the pack and on the same strategy of Scott Dixon and Pato O' Ward, Marco lost control on the high side of turn 1 after checking up to avoid a contact between Conor Daly and Rinus VeeKay. After six snaps, Marco goes for a slow spin and impacts the outside wall on lap 113, he finishes out at 25th. "Bummed for the Mapei USA guys we were going to be looking good at the end, around Dixon. Almost caught it but famous last words. Was a fun race until then. See you next year!"

2025: Marco drives an Andretti Global #98 car, starts 29th in his 20th start after facing Bump Day and qualifying 31st due to lack of grip during the first day of Time Trials. In his last attempt, Marco was set to put himself in the top 30, but a snap on the last lap dropped him behind Graham Rahal by 0.004 mph. Marco was on line to set a late attempt after finding more balance, but time for qualifying finished while Conor Daly made his final attempt. On Bump Day, Marco set the fastest speed and qualified for the race with a single attempt. On race day, Marco gained 2 positions at the start, but impacts the turn 1 outside wall after a slow spin for a 2nd consecutive year, this time when Jack Harvey collides with him after Jack's Dreyer & Reinbold teammate Ryan Hunter-Reay, formerly of Andretti Autosport, moves right, it's one of his worst efforts as he finishes out at 29th completing only 4 laps.

Indianapolis 500 - Races involved in crashes

- 2007, 2009, 2012, 2024, 2025

Indianapolis 500 - Races leading the most laps without winning

- 2012

== Jeff Andretti ==
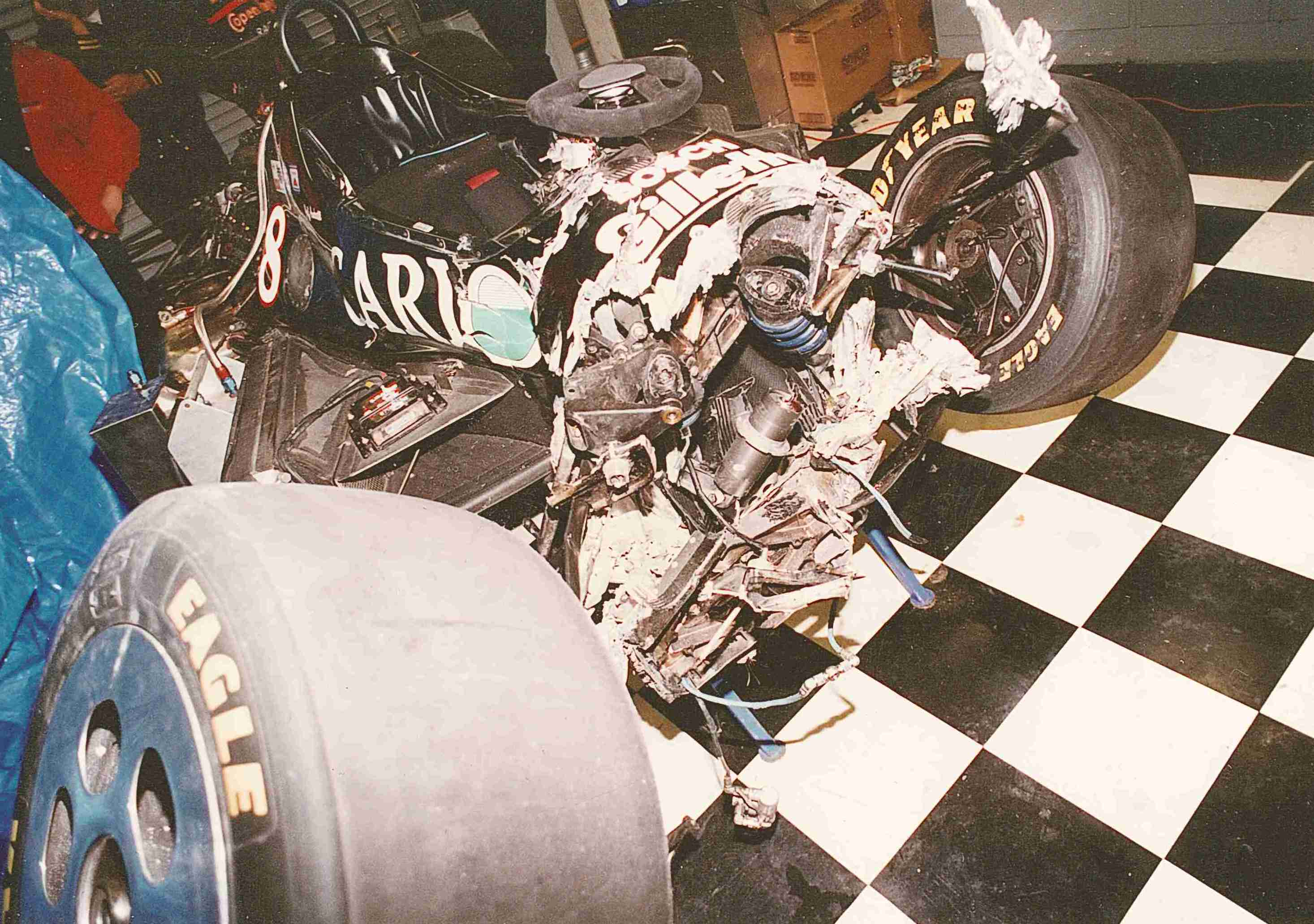
The devastating aftermath of Jeff Andretti's crash in 1992.

Jeff is the son of Mario, and the brother of Michael. He drove in Indianapolis 500 three times (and failed to qualify on two other occasions).

1990: Jeff's first attempt at Indy wound up short. He had a wreck during practice the day before pole day, which coupled with several days of rain, kept him off the track for nearly a week. He completed a qualifying run on the third day of time trials, but his speed was 4th-slowest. On bump day, he was bumped from the field with less than 15 minutes remaining.

1991: Jeff returned for a more successful attempt at Indy. He qualified an impressive 11th, and finished the race in 15th. Though he was not actually running at the finish, he was the highest-placed rookie, and won the rookie of the year award. He became the third Andretti, after his brother Michael and father Mario, to win the rookie of the year.

1992: During the first half of the race, the rear brake rotors kept slipping out of place. Just after the halfway point, the right rear wheel hub broke from his car at turn 2 and he crashed violently head-on into the wall, severely injuring both his legs. He placed 18th, and required a long recuperation.

1993: Jeff returned to Indy after recovering from his injuries in 1992. He experienced the rather dubious distinction of becoming the first driver to spin out on the newly constructed warm-up lane during practice. It would be his final start at Indy, and on race day it ended with a crash.

1994: Jeff entered the month without a ride, but joined Hemelgarn Racing during the second week. He was unable to get the car up to speed, and never made a qualifying attempt.

Jeff's crash in 1992 curtailed his driving career. While he notably recovered and returned to racing within a year, he never achieved a level of success in subsequent competition in the Indy 500, Indy Lights, and the NASCAR Truck Series. In 2011, Jeff Andretti served as the driver coach for rookie Ho-Pin Tung, who crashed during his qualifying attempt, and was unable to qualify.

== John Andretti ==
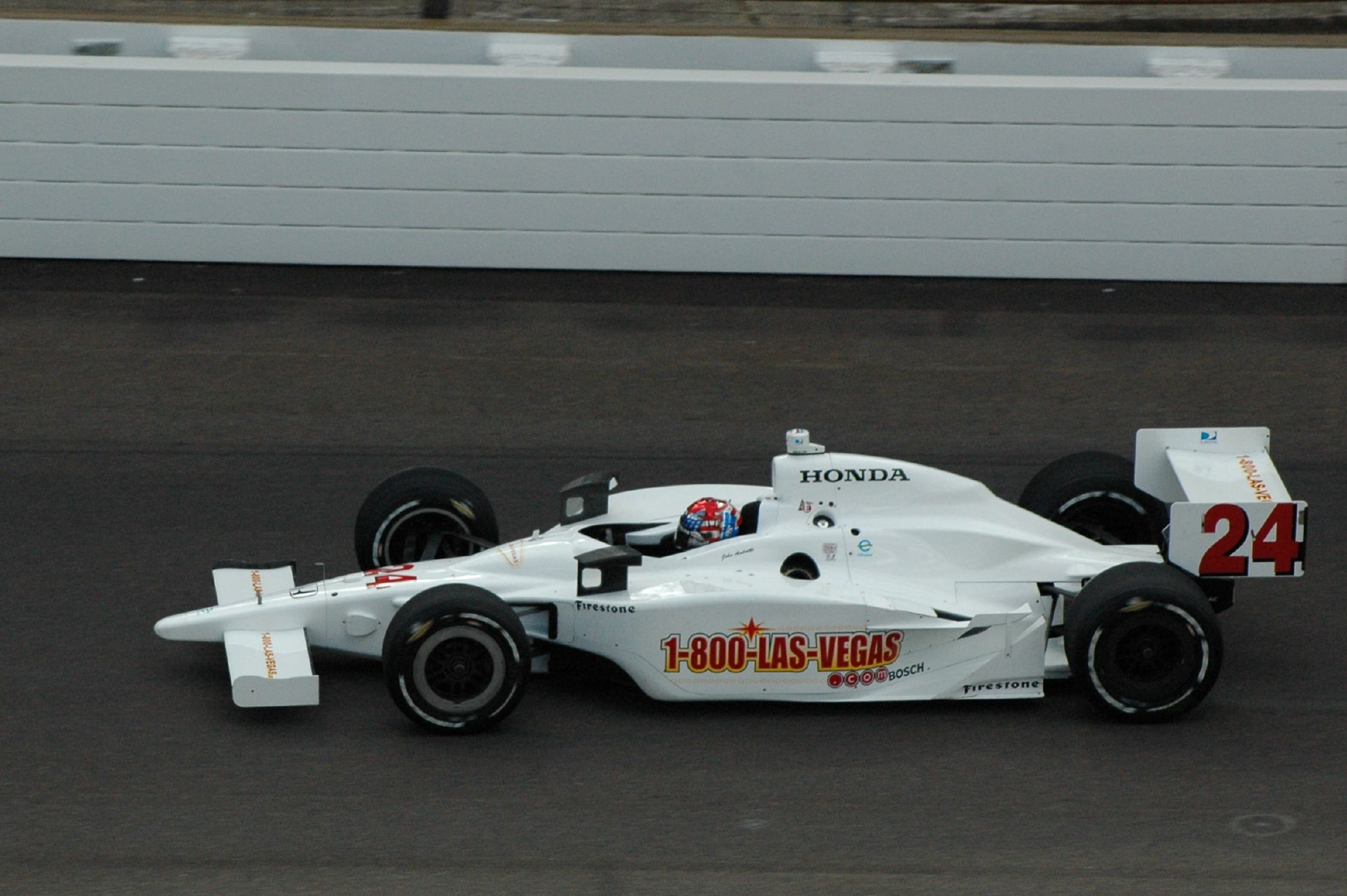
John Andretti driving the Roth Racing #24 car in practice for the 2008 Indianapolis 500

John was the son of Mario's twin brother Aldo, and Michael and Jeff's cousin. He had a long and successful career in several forms of motorsport, including wins in NASCAR, Indy car, and the 24 Hours of Daytona. He also competed for one season in NHRA drag racing, and worked in radio broadcasting. The majority of his career was spent in NASCAR.

John had 12 starts at the Indianapolis 500, with a best finish of 5th in 1991. In 1994, he was the first driver to attempt "Double Duty". This includes a gap of thirteen years between the 1994 race and the 2007 race. Though his misfortunes were not as pronounced as his fellow family members, his success was notably mediocre.

- 1988: In his rookie year at Indy, John dropped out after 114 laps due to engine trouble finishing 21st. He had been running in the top ten. He would suffer a serious crash later in the year at the Pocono 500, but he recovered.
- 1989: Driving for Vince Granatelli, John spun out exiting the pits on lap 35 during his second pit stop. He had hit a metal plate in the pit stall of his teammate Tom Sneva and had to be pulled back for a restart. Shortly after, he had an ignition failure in his Buick and dropped out after 61 laps finishing 25th.
- 1990: John switched the Porsche Indy Car team. On lap 136, after battling a loose condition, John brushed the wall in turn four. He proceeded down the front stretch and spun lazily in turn one. He did not hit the wall, but the suspension was damaged, and he had to drop out finishing 21st.
- 1991: John switched to the Hall VDS team and won the CART season opener at Surfer's Paradise (his first career victory). It would be his best finish at Indy, 5th place, three laps down.
- 1992: John was not a factor during the race but avoided the numerous accidents to finish 8th.
- 1993: John switched to A. J. Foyt Enterprises, and finished 10th, the first time on the lead lap.
- 1994: John attempted an unprecedented racing feat, "Double Duty". He was scheduled to drive in both the Indianapolis 500 and Coca-Cola 600 in the same day. Driving for Foyt once again, John balanced his time well between both tracks and qualified for both races. He came home 10th at Indy, then flew immediately to Charlotte Motor Speedway. He dropped out, however at Charlotte.

From 1994 to 2006, John primarily raced in NASCAR, and did not compete in the Indy 500. He drove in the Brickyard 400 from 1994 to 2003, with only one top ten (7th in 1998), and he finished last in 2003. John tentatively planned a possible entry in the 1997 Indy 500 with Foyt Racing, doing "Double Duty" again, but the deal did not materialize. John was not able to secure permission from his NASCAR team, Cale Yarborough Motorsports.

- 2007: John returned to Indy for the 2007 race. He lost a mirror early on, then crashed near the halfway point finishing 30th.
- 2008: Running at the finish, John was never a factor. He finished a lap down in 16th place.
- 2009: John entered in a joint-effort with Richard Petty. On the second day of qualifying, he badly crashed his primary car, and the team was forced to make repairs, since he had no backup. On Bump Day, John's first attempt was bumped, and his second attempt was too slow. He finally made the field on his third attempt with 5 minutes remaining in the day. On race day, he was the last car on the lead lap, finishing a mediocre 19th.
- 2010: John entered in a joint-effort with Richard Petty and Andretti Autosport. Though the entire Andretti team had trouble getting their machines up to speed during qualifying, John put in a safe speed on bump day without incident. On race day, John wrecked on the backstretch on lap 62 and finished 30th.
- 2011: John finished 22nd three laps down in his final 500.

John was unable to secure a ride in the 500 from 2012 to 2019. He died of colon cancer in January 2020.

== Newman/Haas Racing ==
Starting in 1983, Paul Newman joined the ranks of CART owners, teaming with Carl Haas to form Newman/Haas racing. In their first year, Mario Andretti signed as primary driver, an arrangement that would carry Andretti through the remainder of his career, until his retirement in 1994. Michael Andretti joined the team from 1989 to 1992 and again from 1995 to 2000. During the 1980s, and for the better part of the 1990s, the team was closely aligned with the Andretti family.

Like the Andretti family, Newman's team experienced tremendous success in Indy car racing, with the notable exception of victory at Indianapolis. During Newman's tenure, the team won over 100 Indy car races and eight season championships. With Mario and Michael at the helm, as well as other championship drivers over the years, such as Nigel Mansell, Paul Tracy, and Sébastien Bourdais, the team has failed to achieve victory of any sort at Indianapolis.

Along with Mario's and Michael's many misfortunes during the 1980s and 1990s, Newman/Haas Racing's misfortunes at Indy include several near-misses and crashes. In 1996, the Indy car split saw Newman/Haas (and Newman in particular) take sides firmly with the CART contingent. The team would not return to Indianapolis until 2004.

- 1993: Nigel Mansell was leading the race with 16 laps to go when his inexperience on ovals saw him misjudge the restart speed. He was quickly passed by pole sitter Arie Luyendyk, driving for car owner Chip Ganassi, and eventual winner Emerson Fittipaldi, driving for car owner Roger Penske, and fell to 3rd at the finish.
- 1994: After Mario Andretti dropped out early, Nigel Mansell was the team's only car left. Around the halfway point, Mansell was involved in a bizarre crash where Dennis Vitolo landed on top of Mansell's car.
- 1995: Paul Tracy, former driver for Roger Penske from 1992 to 1994, dropped out with mechanical problems and Michael Andretti's day ended when he brushed the wall while leading.

From 1996 to 2003, Newman/Haas Racing did not enter at Indy due to the CART/IRL "split."

- 2004: Bruno Junqueira was leading the race on lap 150, hoping to stretch his fuel and be leading the race when expected rain arrived; which could have given him the race victory. He was forced to pit, and finished 5th when the race was called on lap 180.
- 2005: Both Bruno Junqueira and Sébastien Bourdais were factors, but both crashed out.

The team skipped the 2006-2007 races.

- 2008: After the open-wheel unification, and what would be Paul Newman's final Indy 500, again both drivers (Justin Wilson and Graham Rahal) crashed out.
- 2009: In the first race after Newman's death, Graham Rahal wrecked out early for the second year in a row. Robert Doornbos did not last long either, as he wrecked out before the halfway point.
- 2010: The team entered only one car for Indy (Hideki Mutoh), and he dropped out after only 76 laps.
- 2011: The team entered two cars. Oriol Servià qualified for the front row, and was a factor on race day. After the pit sequences at the end, he wound up only 6th. Rookie James Hinchcliffe lost a wheel exiting the pits, spun and hit the inside wall, placing 29th.
- 2012: The team initially entered with a Lotus for Jean Alesi, but withdrew. Soon after, the team formally disbanded.

== Footnotes ==
=== Works cited ===
- George's devastating victory, Ed Hinton, ESPN.com, June 3, 2010
- Marco Andretti is the latest to deal with Indy’s ‘Andretti Curse.’
- Passionate Andrettis hope reunion will break their Indy 500 curse
- Curses! Andretti family brushes off so-called curse after 4 decades of failure at Indianapolis
