= Motovun =

Motovun Montona
- Municipality
- Motovun Municipality; Općina Motovun – Comune di Montona
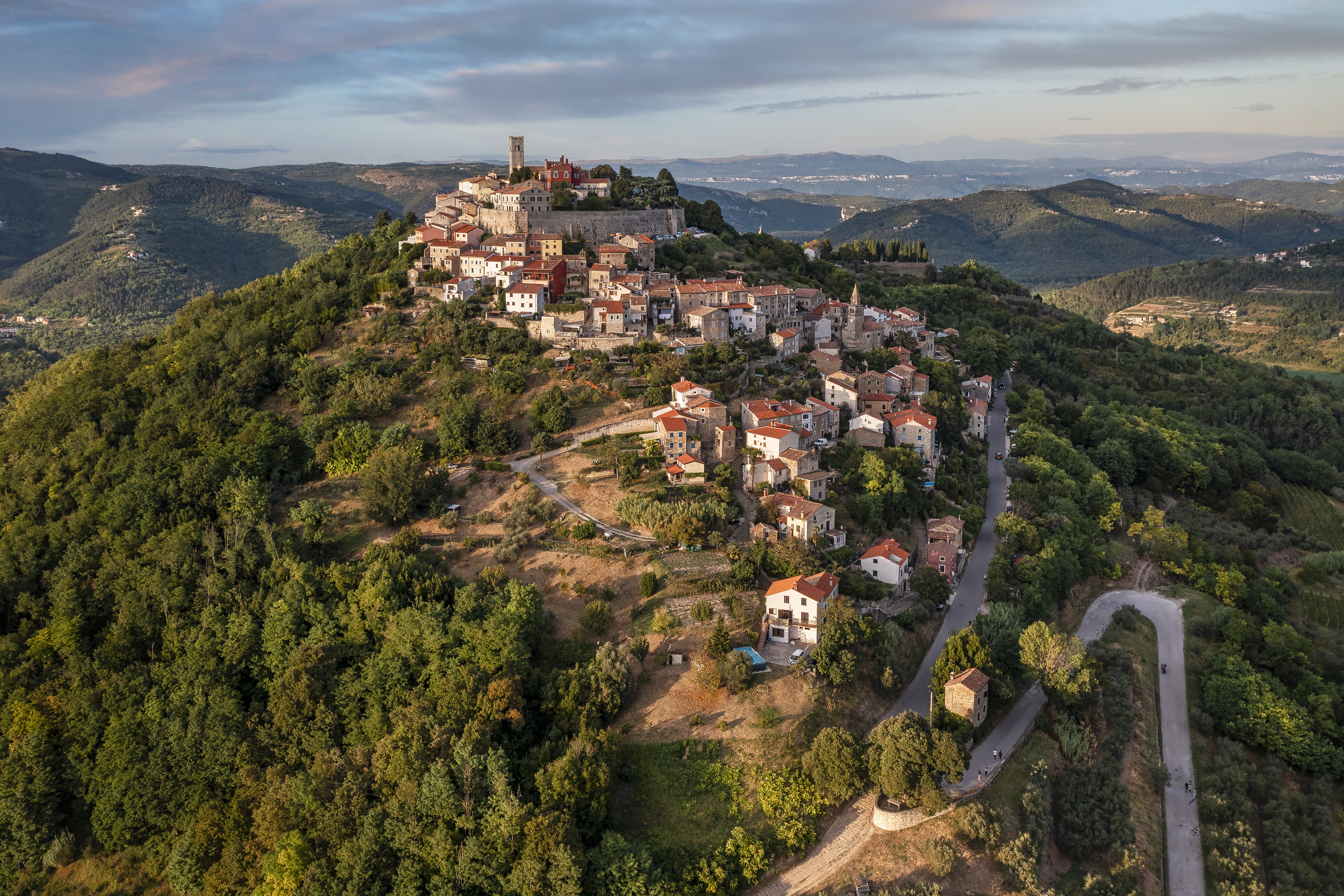
- Aerial view

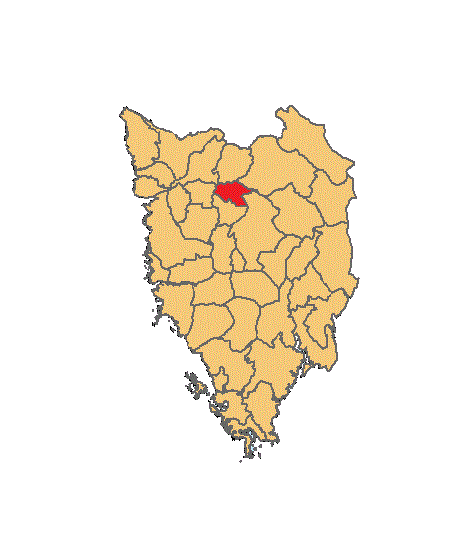
- Location of Motovun in Istria
- Interactive map of Motovun
- Location within Croatia
- Coordinates: 45°20′N 13°50′E
- Country: Croatia
- County: Istria County

Government
  - Mayor: Tomislav Pahović

Area
  - Municipality: 12.6 sq mi (32.7 km^{2})
  - Urban: 5.3 sq mi (13.7 km^{2})
- Elevation: 909 ft (277 m)

Population (2021)
  - Municipality: 912
  - Density: 72.2/sq mi (27.9/km^{2})
  - Urban: 397
  - Urban density: 75.1/sq mi (29.0/km^{2})
- Time zone: UTC+1 (CET)
  - Summer (DST): UTC+2 (CEST)
- Postal code: 52424 Motovun
- Area code: 52
- Website: motovun.hr

Motovun (Croatian pronunciation: [mɔtɔ̌ʋuːn], Italian: Montona or Montona d'Istria) is a village and a municipality in central Istria, west Croatia. In ancient times, both Celts and Illyrians built their fortresses at the location of present-day Motovun. The name of the village is also of Celtic origin, derived from Montona, meaning "a town in the hills". The Parenzana, a narrow-gauge railroad that ran from Trieste to Poreč between 1902 and 1935, passed below the town.

== Description ==
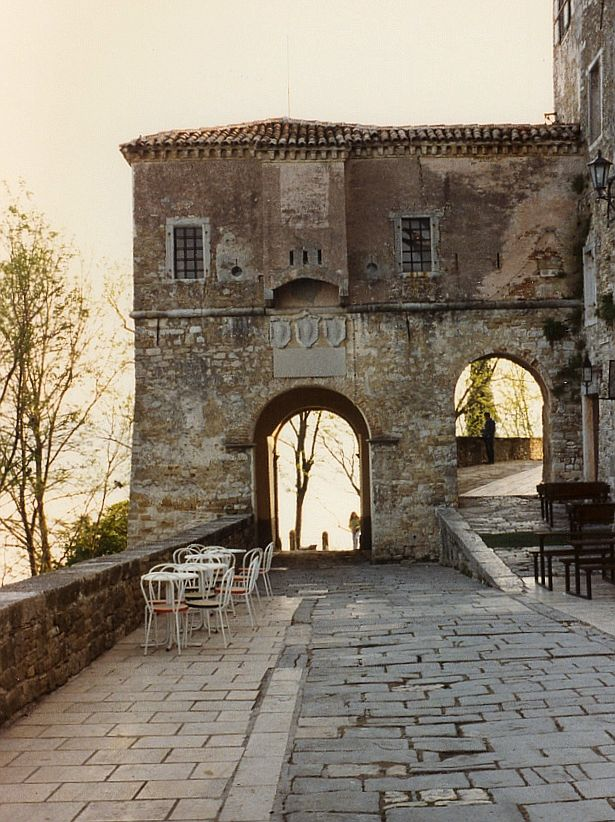
City gate

Motovun is a medieval town that grew up on the site of an ancient city called Castellieri. It is on a hill 270 metres (886 feet) above sea level with houses scattered all over the hill. On the inner walls are several coats-of-arms of different Motovun ruling families and two gravestones of Roman inhabitants (dating from the 1st century).

In the 10th and 11th centuries it belonged to the bishop of Poreč. From 1278 it was taken over by Venice and surrounded by solid walls which are still intact today, and used as a walkway with unique views over the four corners of Istria. The three parts of the town are connected by a system of internal and external fortifications with towers and city gates containing elements of Romanesque, Gothic and Renaissance styles, built between the 14th and 17th centuries. It is a typical example of Venetian colonial architecture.

=== Parish Church of St. Stephen ===
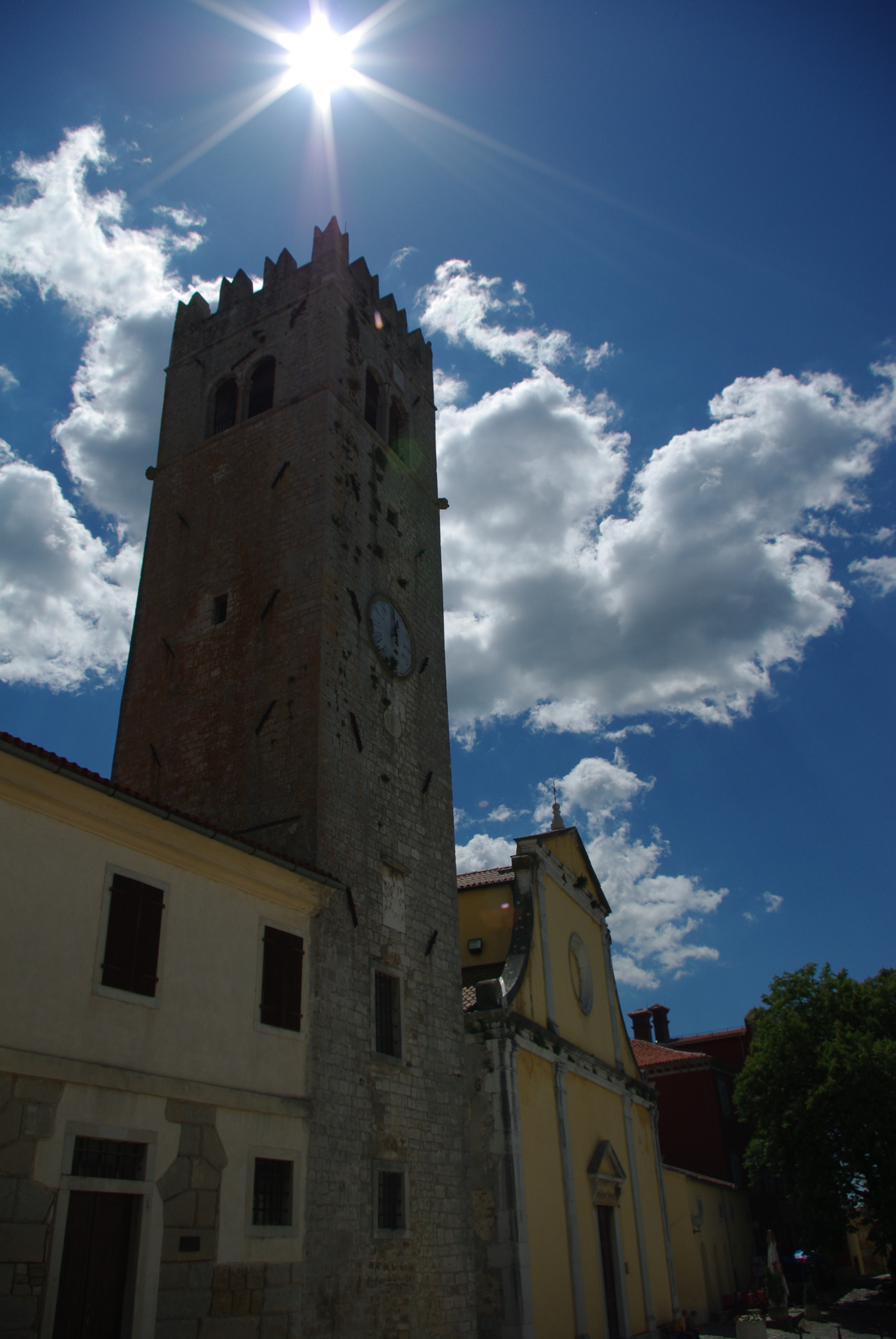
The old church in Motovun

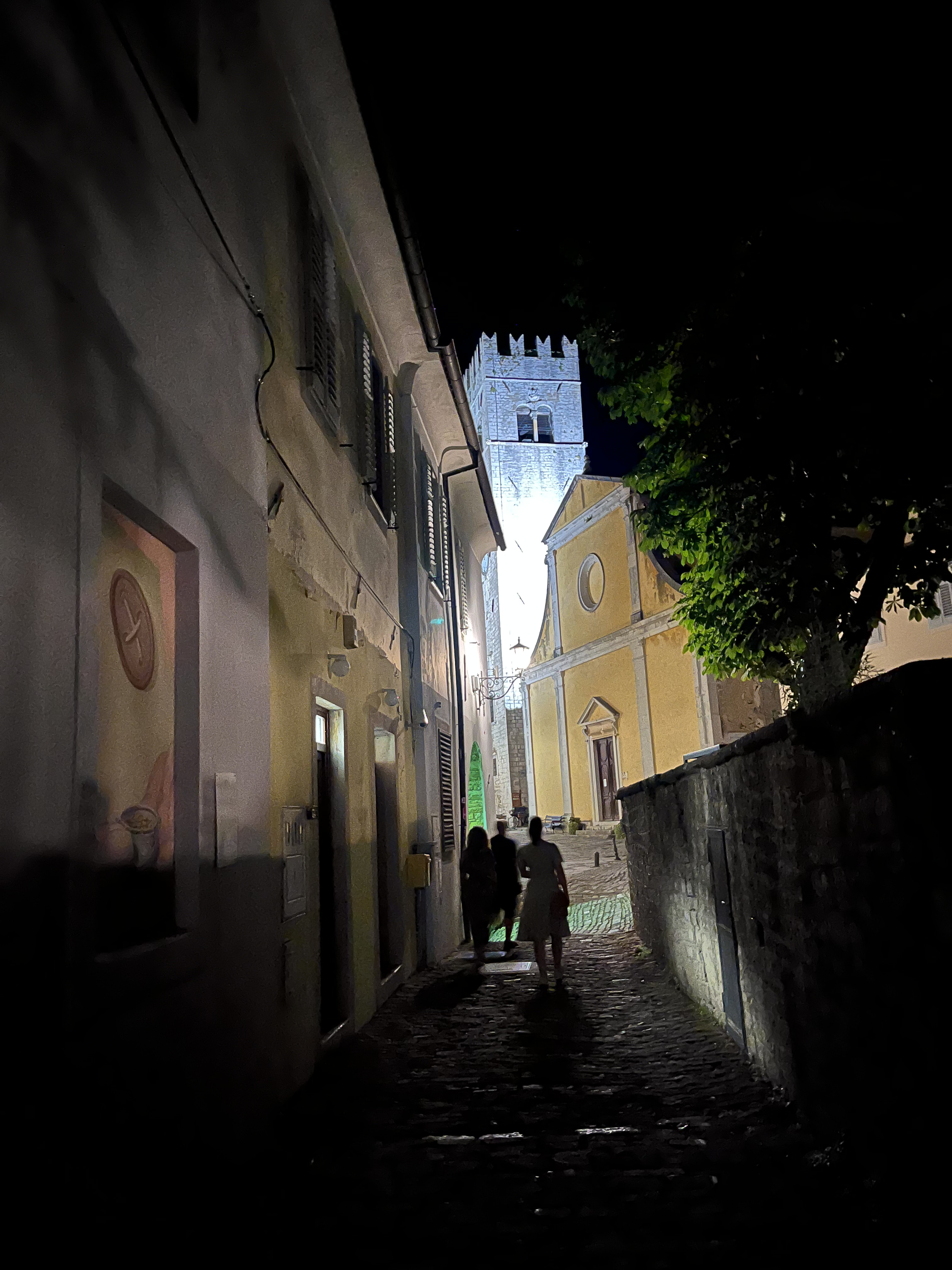
Parish Church of St. Stephen, a view from the Mure Street

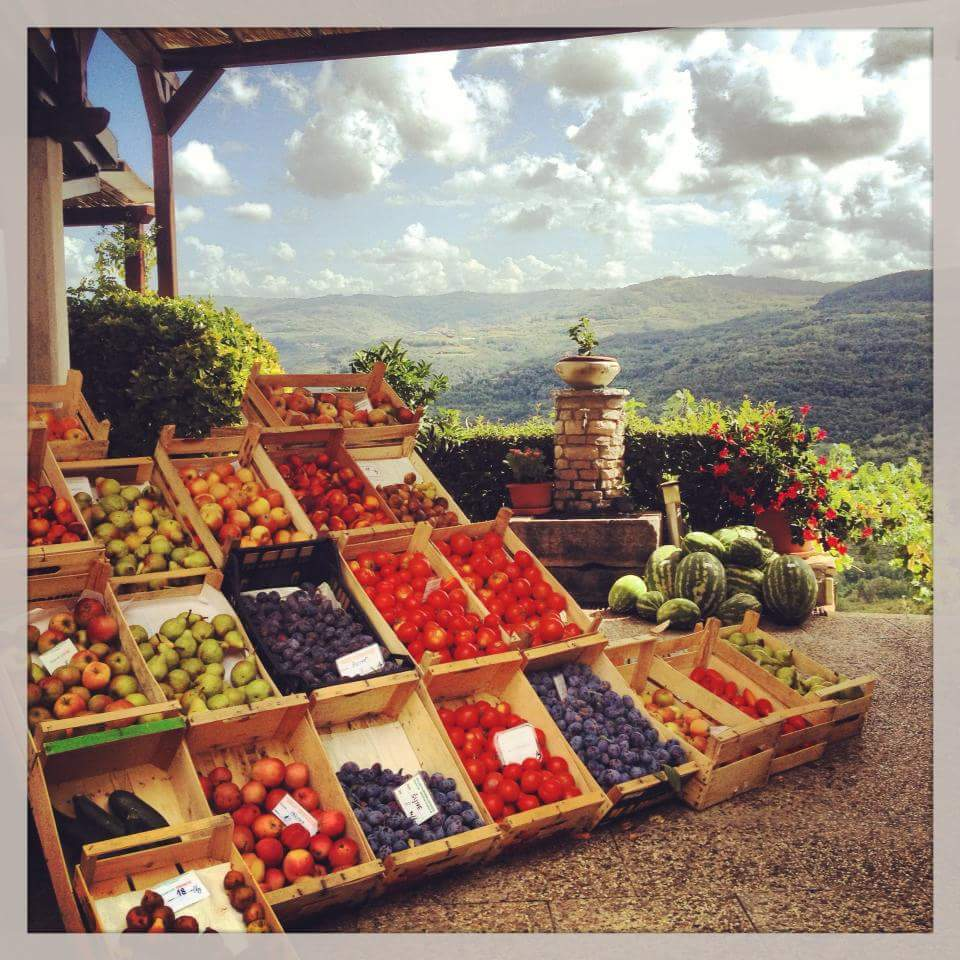
Street fruit and vegetable vendor in Motovun

The late-Renaissance church of St. Stephen (Sveti Stjepan) was built at the beginning of the 17th century from sketches probably designed by the well-known Renaissance architect Andrea Palladio (1508–1580). The church contains several works of art: the marble statues of St. Stephen and St. Laurence by Francesco Bonazzo and the 17th-century painting of the Last Supper over the altar by an unknown Venetian artist. The water cisterns in the square in front of the church date from the 14th and 15th centuries.

=== The forest of Motovun/Montona ===
The river Mirna or Quieto flows below the hill and on the other side of the river is the famous Motovun forest, an area of about 10 square kilometres (4 sq mi) in the valley of the river Mirna, of which 280 hectares (690 acres) is specially protected. This area differs completely not only from the nearby forests, but also from those of the entire surrounding karst region because of its wildlife, moist soil and prized black and white truffles (Tuber magnatum), which grow successfully there. Since this fungus grows underground, it is gathered with the aid of specially trained dogs.

The most common tree in the forest is the English or brown oak (Quercus robur). To preserve natural conditions for the development of the Motovun forest, the protected area is occasionally flooded, even though the River Mirna is controlled and its entire valley protected from flooding.

On the slopes of the hill, grapes for famous Istrian wines are grown: the Teran and the Malvazija wine.

=== The legend of Veli Jože ===
Motovun is known among today's population of Istria as the city of Veli Jože, the good gentle giant, written by the nationalist Vladimir Nazor, one of the most important Croatian writers of the 20th century. The story was based on local folktales as a response to the national struggles of the Croats for equality with the politically dominant ethnic German and Italian community (1900–1914). The tale is known today throughout Croatia, while the character of Veli Jože is quite correctly linked with the city.

=== The city today ===
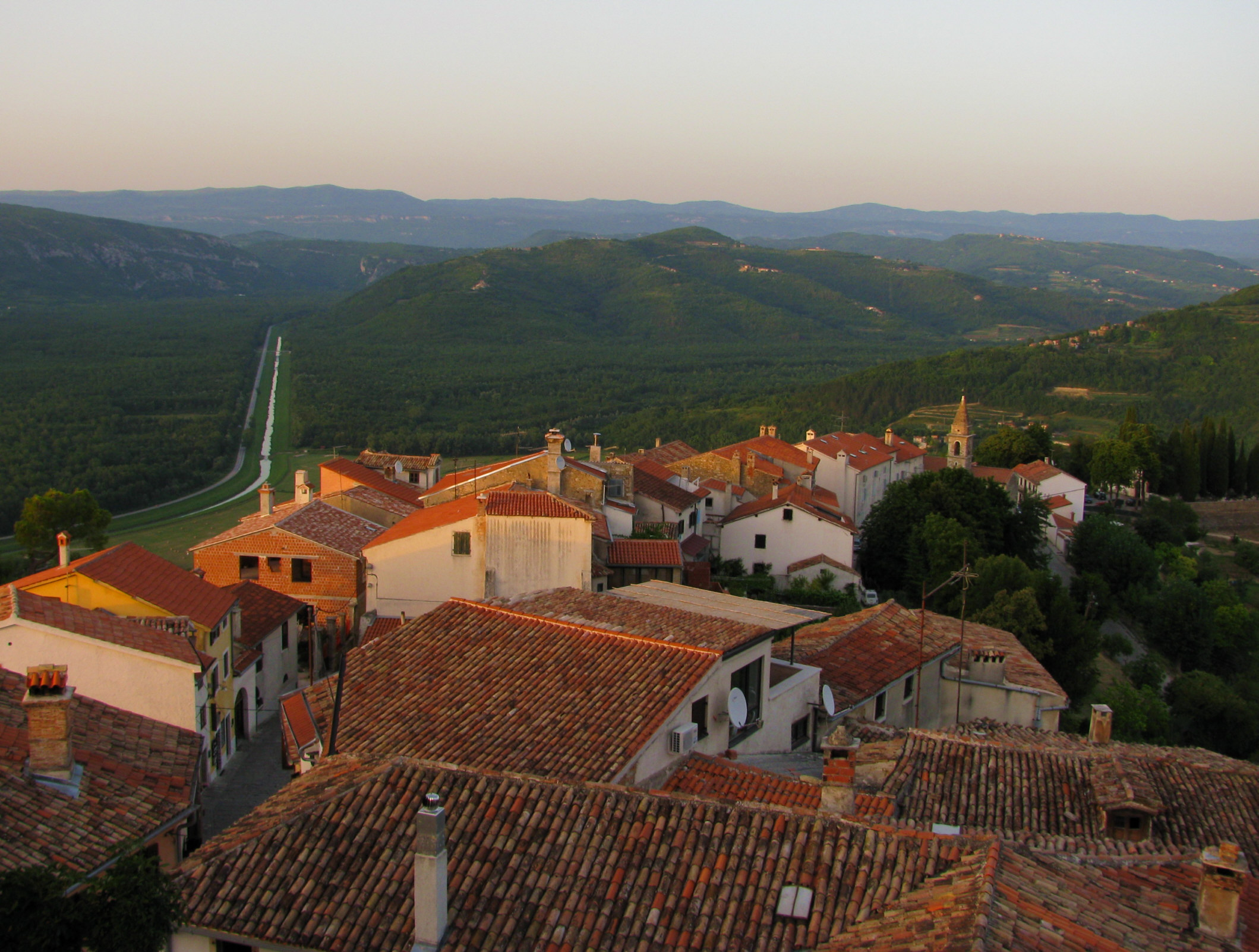
View from Motovun walls

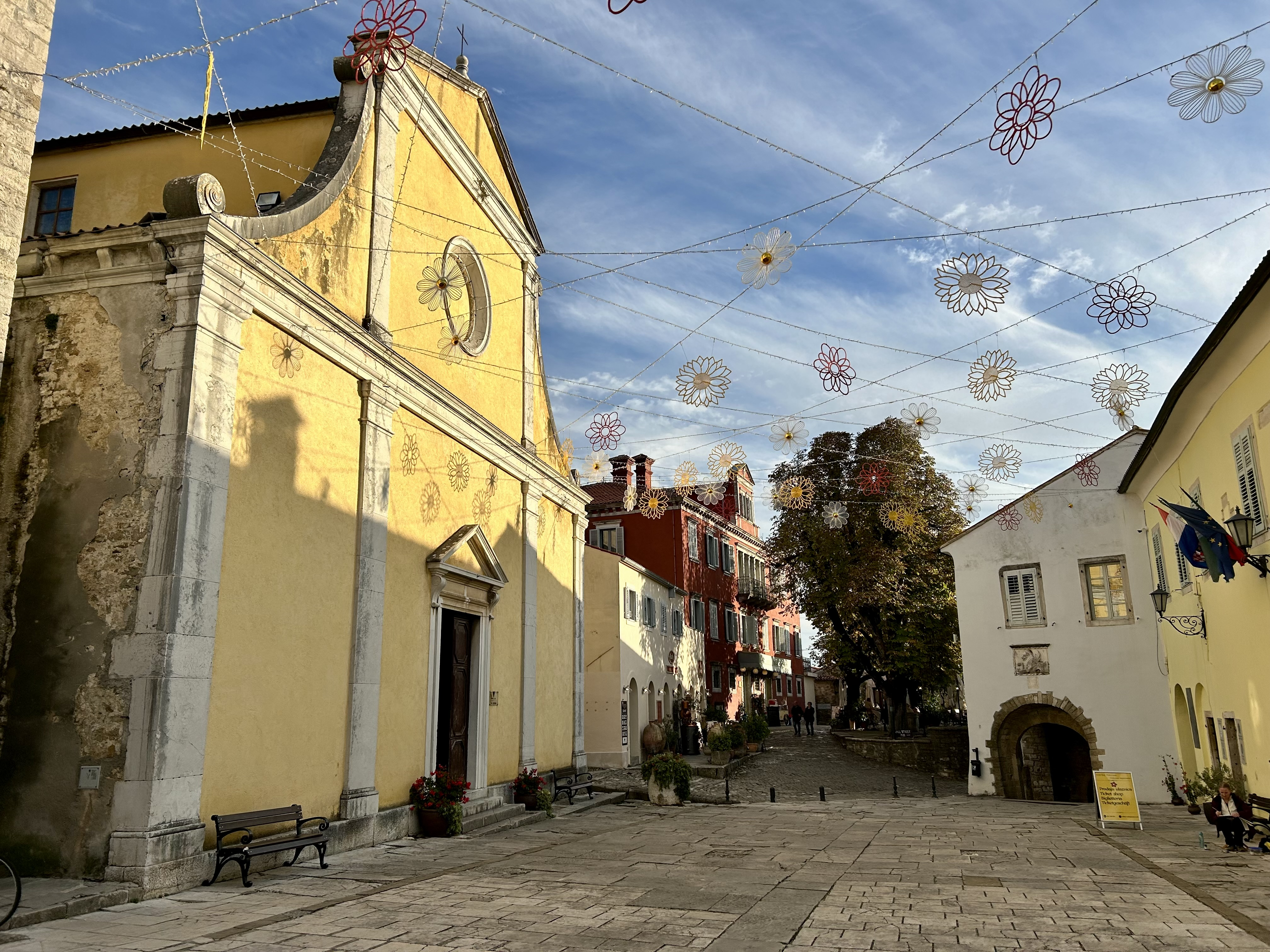
Andrea Antico Square

Since 1999, Motovun has hosted the international Motovun Film Festival for independent and avant-garde films from the U.S. and Europe.

The biggest current local issue is the battle between foreign developers, who have proposed two 18-hole golf courses and a 500+-bed resort in the valley below the town, extending the existing 9-hole course and some of the local community, who are opposed to the proposals because of objections against the real estate speculation around the project, rejection of 123 building sites for villas in the protected natural environment and concerns about possible damage to their truffles growing on the other side of the river. The community is divided on the issue, as many welcome the development as a year-round aid to jobs and local tourist revenues. An environmental impact study has now been completed.

Motovun's ground plan was depicted on the reverse of the Croatian 10 kuna banknote, issued in 1993, 1995, 2001 and 2004.

== Demographics ==
According to the 2021 census, its population was 912, with 397 living in the settlement of Motovun itself.

The municipality consists of the following settlements:

- Brkač, population 223
- Kaldir, population 228
- Motovun, population 397
- Sveti Bartol, population 64
Motovun: Population trends 1857–2021
v

population	1929	1995	2537	2694	2713	3011	2469	2506	2613	2049	1850	1385	1261	1098	983	1004	912
	1857	1869	1880	1890	1900	1910	1921	1931	1948	1953	1961	1971	1981	1991	2001	2011	2021

Sources: Croatian Bureau of Statistics publications

The population of the village itself was 531, with a total of 983 residents in the municipality in 2001; 192 residents spoke Italian as their mother tongue.

=== Languages ===
Although though the Government of the Republic of Croatia does not guarantee official Croatian-Italian bilinguialism here, the statute of Motovun-Montona itself does.

== Notable residents ==
- Motovun is the birthplace of racing driver Mario Andretti and his twin brother Aldo in 1940. The brothers raced hand-crafted wooden cars through the steep streets. After World War II Istria became a part of Croatia, a sovereign constituent unit of Yugoslavia. His family, like many other ethnic Italians, emigrated. They lived in a camp near Lucca from 1948 to 1955. The Andretti family resettled in Nazareth, Pennsylvania, United States.
- Motovun was also the birthplace in 1495 of prominent Renaissance Italian music printer Andrea Antico, famous as the inventor of the first movable wooden types for printing musical scores. He started publishing in Rome in 1510 and after obtaining a patent from Pope Leo X he published polyphonic music and music for organ.

== In popular culture ==
- American film Speak No Evil starring James McAvoy and Mackenzie Davis was filmed in Motovun, representing the Toscany in Italy.

== See also ==
- Veli Jože (novel)
- Tentative list of World Heritage Sites in Croatia
- Motovune, Americana Acoustic Rock band from Waukegan, Illinois

== Notes ==
- The Statute of Motovun (in Croatian)
