= Kaldir =

Kaldir Caldier
- Village
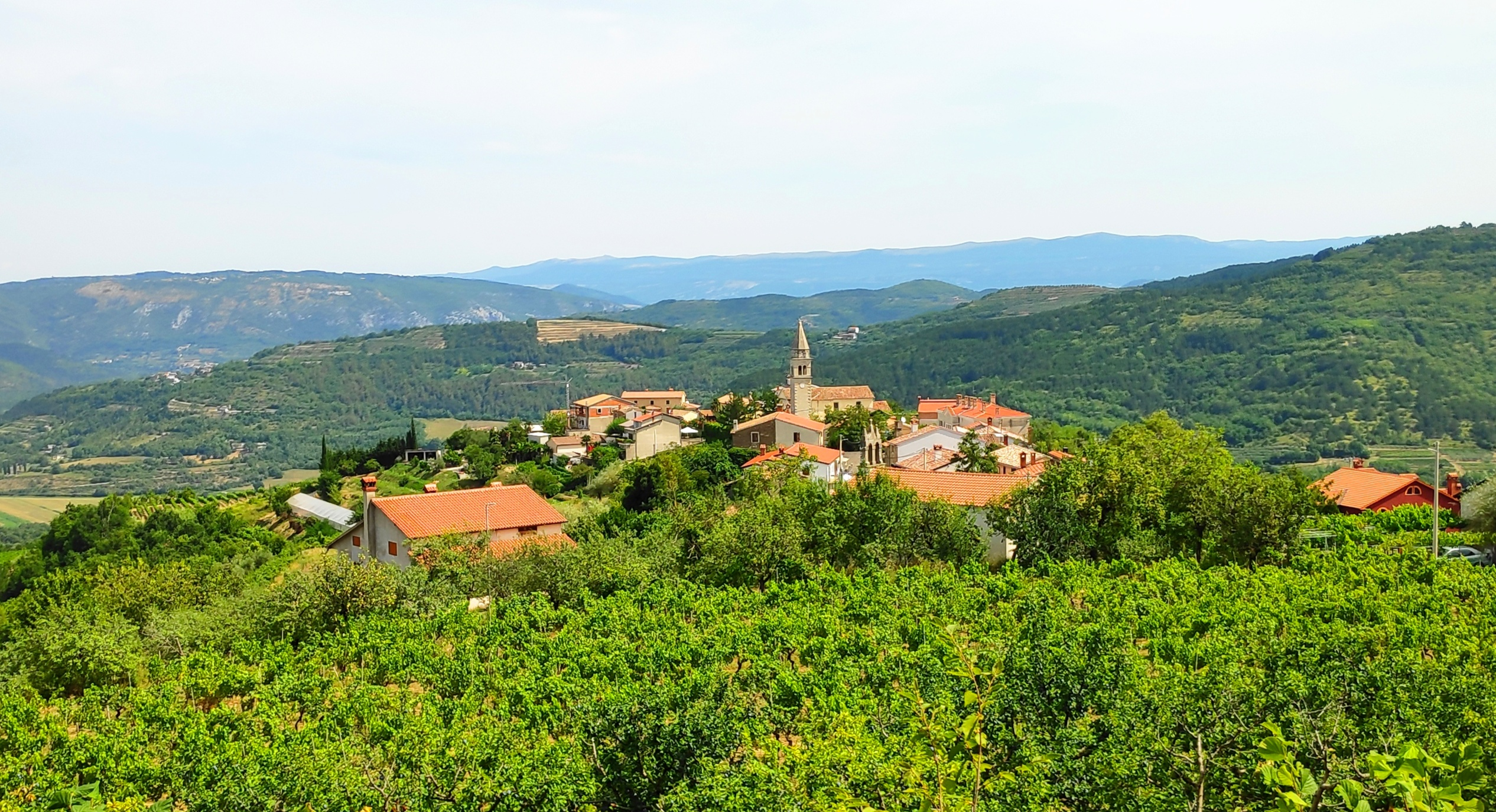

- Location within Croatia
- Coordinates: 45.3131339°N 13.8412202°E
- Country: Croatia
- County: Istria County
- Municipality: Motovun

Area
  - Total: 1.9 sq mi (5.0 km^{2})

Population (2021)
  - Total: 228
  - Density: 120/sq mi (46/km^{2})
- Time zone: UTC+1 (CET)
  - Summer (DST): UTC+2 (CEST)
- Postal code: 52424 Motovun
- Area code: 052

Kaldir (Italian: Caldier) is a village in the municipality of Motovun, Istria in Croatia.

== Demographics ==
According to the 2021 census, its population was 228.
