= Sveti Bartol =

Sveti Bartol San Bortolo
- Village
- Interactive map of Sveti Bartol
- Location within Croatia
- Coordinates: 45.3287802°N 13.8421691°E
- Country: Croatia
- County: Istria County
- Municipality: Motovun

Area
  - Total: 3.2 sq mi (8.2 km^{2})

Population (2021)
  - Total: 64
  - Density: 20/sq mi (7.8/km^{2})
- Time zone: UTC+1 (CET)
  - Summer (DST): UTC+2 (CEST)
- Postal code: 52424 Motovun
- Area code: 052

Sveti Bartol (Italian: San Bortolo) is a village in the municipality of Motovun, Istria in Croatia.

== Demographics ==
According to the 2021 census, its population was 64.
