= Veli Jože =

Short story by Vladimir Nazor

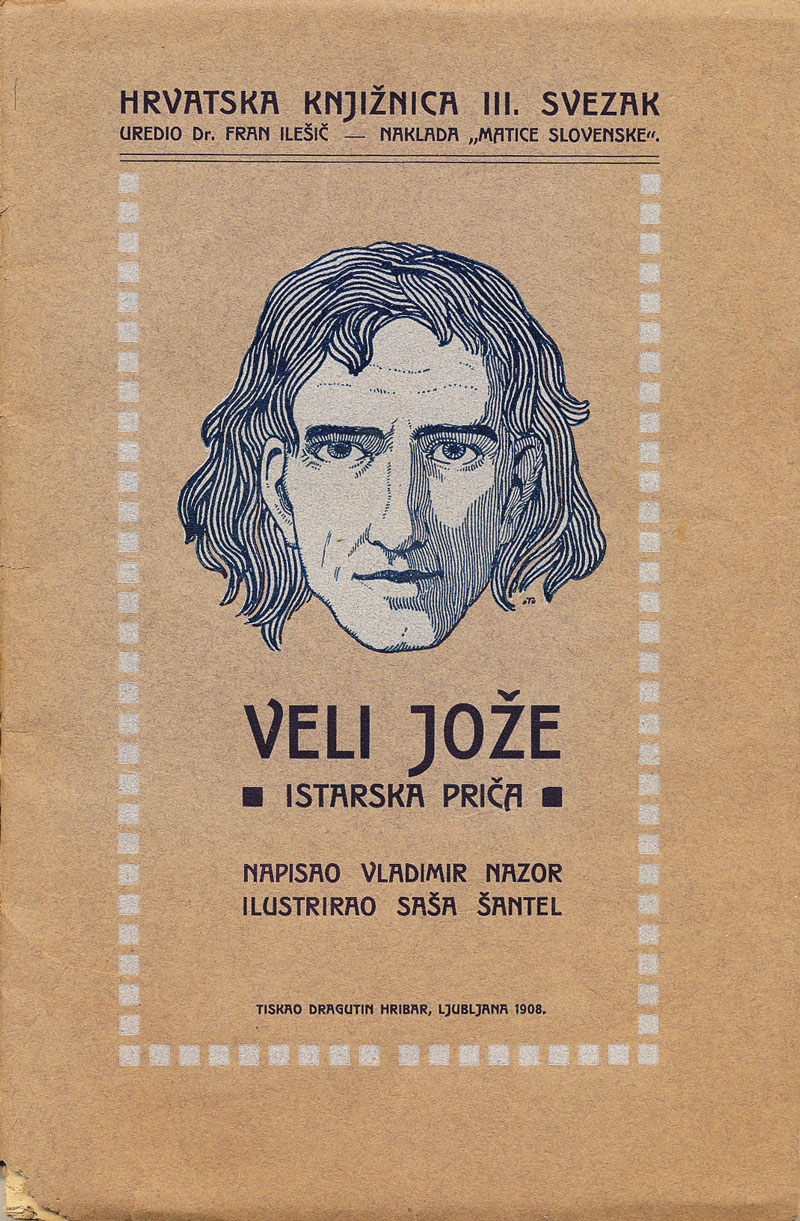
- First-edition cover
- Author: Vladimir Nazor
- Language: Croatian
- Genre: Epic
- Publisher: Dragutin Hribar, Ljubljana
- Publication date: 1908
- Publication place: Yugoslavia
- Pages: 103

Veli Jože: Istarska priča (Croatian for 'Big Joe' / 'Great Joe: An Istrian Tale') is a novel by the Croatian author Vladimir Nazor, first published in 1908. Taking place on the Istrian peninsula during the Venetian rule, the story tells about Jože, a friendly and good-hearted giant. Veli Jože is one of the most famous works of Vladimir Nazor.

== Background ==
While sojourning in Motovun, Nazor noticed a big and rugged guy on the street, who was carrying a large trunk almost bigger than himself on his shoulder. Nazor was delighted by the proud stature of the man, and the joy and happiness on his face, and thus got the inspiration for his story. Nazor put together local legends to create the plot. According to legends, in the past, in addition to people, Istria was inhabited by many friendly giants, who were poisoned by the common people out of malice, leaving just one in each city to take advantage of them. Thus the giants cultivated the fields, tamed the wild beasts, and did all the other hardest jobs, jobs that the common people wouldn't do and despised. The book was first published in 1908 in Ljubljana.

== Plot summary ==
Veli Jože belonged to the people of Motovun, who did not treat him nicely.

Similarly to Roald Dahl's 1982 novel The BFG, Jože is described as a friendly and good-hearted giant. He is both a giant and a giant-looking serf. The action begins when the providur Barbabianka, šjor Zuane Dalla Zonta and the guard of Motovun forest go about Istria to mark with lime the Turkey oaks that they will cut down and take away to Venice. It is a hot summer day. The providur is riding on a donkey, which at one point jumps up, for he sees a haystack next to some shack where a beautiful Turkey oak is growing. Barbabianka then decides that this Turkey oak will warm him this winter in Koper. As he begins to mark the tree, someone's strong hands grab the donkey and throw it up to the top of the tree. Beside the stack and the dead donkey stands the serf Jože, looking gloomily at the providur.

The providur is frightened and tells šjor Zuane to do something. Zuane, the forest ranger, has a little fun at first because it is funny to him to watch the providur shaking, but then he puts a stick in the providur's hands and order him to strike and tame the giant. At first he is afraid to approach him in any way, but then he goes on and hits him. Jože is ordered to kneel down and kiss the gentleman's hand, which he does. Šjor Zuane explains to Jože that the providur Barbabianka is a gentleman, and that he would take him through the forest to the city. Along the way, Barbabianka realizes that Jože is an obedient serf, but he is still afraid. He questions him as to whether he has had enough food and how old he is. The giant then explains to him that his masters let him eat, but that they constantly curse him and that he is three hundred years old, although he "thinks he might be older". Jože tells him that everything was better back then, that his father helped build the city, and that there were many more giants like him, but he was left alone. Then the idea comes to Barbabianka to take Jože with him to Venice, keeping the giant on a leash like a dog. The streets in Motovun are crowded with armed people, the bell rings because Jože is seen coming, even though he is forbidden to enter the city because it is his duty to work in the fields and in the woods for the municipality. But the townspeople are surprised to see that Jože is carrying Barbabianka. The latter is congratulated in the town hall for taming the giant, and Barbabianka, although he did nothing, believes in his own heroism.

The indulgence and delight seemed to Barbabianka so sincere, that he almost saw for himself that his mother had given birth to him as a hero, and he stood up even more magnificently in the armchair.

In the town hall, they decide not to feed Jože anymore, they discuss whether to poison him and how to restrain him. Civetta, the city economist, says that Jože is valuable and needed by the city. He explains to them that he is plowing the land and hunting game for them, and defending them from the enemy. As they are deciding whether to kill him or just banish him, the providur says that Jože will go to Koper with him for Easter, and that they will feed him as before.

At one point when he is being ridiculed, Jože gets angry, and the people who were used to look at his benevolent face are now frightened. When Jože starts shaking the Motovun bell tower, they run away screaming. It is not clear to Jože why his masters flee before him as if they were mice. He wonders whether it is possible that they fear him, whether it might be the master who lives to enslave them fears the serf.

When Easter comes, Jože is satisfied with his life. He doesn't know that the people of Motovun are discussing his fate in the town hall. Zuane and a few others ask Jože to stay in Motovun because he is worth a lot to them, citing numerous examples of serfs helping them out, but most are still in favor of him leaving in the hope that he will drown during the trip. From Koper, Jože sails to Venice with the providur. Although he is not happy to be far from the Istrian forests, he cannot complain too much because Barbabianka treats him well. For the first time in his life, Jože, in his grief and nostalgia for Motovun, thinks that his masters are unjust to him because they are sending him away from his country.

They are sailing on sails, but when the wind dies down, oars appear from the ship's sides. From the bowels of the ship comes the clatter of chains and a sad song. Jože lifts the lid on the deck, and a large head appears from the opening. At that moment, two giants watch each other without a word. The chained giant says his name is Ilija (Croatian for 'Elijah'). He tells Jože that he's a slave, and he cannot escape because he was beaten, and now is lame, as well as chained. He tells him all about life on the galley and that he too will become a slave. When Jože tells him about his life, Ilija gets angry and tells him that he has to fight, not to allow his masters to take advantage of him.

"We are people like them," said Ilija. "But did we ever enslave them like cattle even though we are stronger? The dog does not give up on a bone and chases the stranger out of his yard; but you, Jože, let the little people trample on you and suck your spirit - you, who are so strong. Shame on you, brother!

He tells him to fight them, to free himself because he can out of his strength, and to work for himself. Then Jože remembers the moment near the Motovun tower when his masters were fleeing from him, and now he understands. Ilija tells him that there will be a big storm, in which he will sink with the ship, because he cannot move, but that Jože will escape. Then Jože promises Ilija that he will fight for his freedom. The storm begins, Jože jumps into the water and wakes up ashore in the morning.

Jože has been carried ashore by the sea on the shore of Raška Draga, people who see him instantly say that this giant must have destroyed the ship. Here, Jože meets Jurić (Croatian for 'Georgie'), who was also a giant serf and whom Jože manages to persuade to stop serving his masters as in the previous two hundred years and to come with him. Jože gathers around him twenty giant serfs who together go to the hills between Pazin and Motovun. People are afraid of them and tell each other stories whereby the giants will soon attack them. The giants, however, settle on the hills. Meanwhile, the nobles and lords are figuring out what to do now that the serfs have deserted them. The vineyards and gardens are deserted, and there is none to do the job.

The townspeople discuss whether attacking the giants or try and persuade them to return. Eventually they send out an army and two knights to the hills. In Psoglavčevo Brdo (Croatian for 'the Doghead's Hill'), Joze and the other giants start cultivating the land, and see how nice it is to work while they are free and working for themselves. They even start arranging the walls. Jurić comes across gold while digging, not even knowing what it is. Jože sees that the people of Motovun are like crazy about the gold. Jurić then continues to dig the pit, not caring about the gold and silver he has dug.

When the knights and the army arrive, the giants decide not to shed blood. Because the knights think that the serfs are standing still because they are afraid of their perennial masters, they order an attack. When the giants see that mass climbing up on them, running, trying to overcome them, they obey Jože and easily sweep them away. The giants use the strong oak trees of the nearby forest as brooms to sweep away the enemy in the battle.

After managing to retreat, the army encamps on the hill named Štrigina Glavica (Croatian for 'Strzyga's Little Head'), where Civetta laughs at their failure and advises them to send someone to talk to the needed serfs and persuade them to return. The masters have no answer when Jože tells them that they do not wish to return because they are free up here. The common people do not realize that these serfs are becoming aware of their freedom and the value of it. The serfs tell them to work on their own fields, because they are not returning. When they are ready to return to the city as penitents, Jože decides to give them the silver and gold that Jurić has excavated, for which they were so mad about. After returning to the city with this loot, all citizens and nobles seek a share of the gold, claiming that the gold once belonged to their ancestors and that the giants have the least rights to it.

Upon hearing of the gold, the citizens start digging on all sides of the hill at night, but find nothing. One night, Jože catches several citizens digging, and tells them that if they want gold, they'll have to earn it. The citizens then conclude that it is better to work for Jože rather than the nobles because they would surely earn more, and so they agree. When people in the city hear that the citizens are working for the serfs, they consider it the greatest shame and betrayal, and decide to punish whoever is accountable for it.

More citizens come to work for Jože, the harvest around Psoglavčevo Brdo is rich. Jože almost becomes friends with the former masters, he gives everyone money and more than deserved. When, after the harvest, everyone heads back to the city, Civetta says that he is staying because he thinks the serfs have not yet achieved freedom, and that gold was the only reason why the citizens were workings with Jože. After a while of enjoying working for themselves and their freedom, the giants begin to resent that someone's estate is bigger or better than someone else's. Jurić is mad at Jože because he did not tell him of the value of the gold, which he then squandered, the gold that Jurić was the first to find.

When the grain and corn are divided, a big quarrel arises because everyone thinks that most of it belongs to them. Jože is all affected and angry, so he leaves the meeting. That evening Civetta sees a fire burning on the hill. Jože comes, looking for wine, telling Civetta that he is the one who set fire to the grain out of anger. He tells him what happened at the meeting. Jože says that he will not serve the giant Liberat, that he will rather live alone.

The next day Civetta goes to the giants, who are discussing what to do now, they tell him that Liberat is now their chief, but that they think it better to be Civetta because the gentleman is a gentleman after all. Civetta is a little reluctant at first but agrees after the giants promise to listen to him in everything. News come from the town that the Motovun forest is deserted, and there's no more gold on Psoglavčevo Brdo. On Christmas, Civetta decides to create a rift among the serfs by telling them that the land shall be divided. Thereupon everyone breaks out in panic and starts scrutinizing the land, looking for the best piece of land that is fit to them and that they deserve most.

The biggest dispute is over the valley between Psoglavčevo Brdo and Štrigina Glavica: Civetta suggests that it belongs to Jože because he cultivated it, but the serfs now think that that is the best piece of land. After two days, it is decided that half of it shall be Jože's, and half will belong to Marko and Liberat. Jože tells Civetta which part is his. He gets angry because he is not allowed at the meeting where the partition is formalized. All the giants swear after signing the contracts that Civetta has prepared, that they will respect everybody except Jože, who is not there and who just told them that the valley is his and that they should not come over there.

However, one day Marko descends into the valley, so Jože attacks him and beats him. When Marko returns bruised to the city, Liberat persuades his friends to gather and go and attack Jože because he's not stronger than all of them together. The other giants secretly rejoice that Jože attacked Marko, because they were also sore at the fact that Liberat and Marko got a better piece of land.

Liberat gathers his courage and goes down to the land he considers his own, showing Jože the contract book he thinks guarantees him security and full ownership over the land. All this only angers Jože all the more. He gathers the giants, and asks them to work together and share everything. In what ensues, Jože kills Liberat in a rage.

Jože got up and knelt down. Blood dripped from his nose and mouth; a wild flame burned in his eyes. There was a moment of stupor, with those bloody streams on his chin and neck, his eyes wide, his hair disheveled. He felt a storm in his chest, a noise in his ears, and before his eyes Liberat's image trembled, blurry like the image of a beast in the twilight mist

No one is allowed to approach the corpse for two days, and Civetta takes advantage of the situation by exaggerating events to the serfs, instilling in them even greater fear. In the morning they tell Civetta that they would like to return to their masters, that they have nothing to live on, that they have always been serfs, and that this is what they do best. In this insidious way, Civetta manages to create a rift among the giants and to force them to return to servitude voluntarily.

Civetta is the last to leave, taking Veli Jože with him to Motovun. He feels triumphant, having achieved what neither the knights, the army nor the citizens together had managed. The closer they get to the city, the more slowly Jože walks, because he knows what he is returning to. He now knows what it is like to be free and to work for himself, but he also considers himself a sinner for having killed a man and a friend, and believes he deserves to be a serf again.

He saw the procession of citizens and remembered the suffering, the insults and the shame. To be a toy in the hand of those people again? He experienced freedom; knew what it means to be your own; he was convinced that the citizens were worse than him, that there was nothing to fear from them

At one point Jože looks at the sea and a sailing ship and sees oars. He then remembers Ilija and his words: "You are a man too". He seems to hear his sad song in the bowels of the ship again and remembers the promise he had made to him. He decides not to make the same mistake again, not to agree to be a slave. Civetta is hitting his ass more and more to get to the city faster because he hears the crowd clapping and shouting at him. Everyone rushes to him, to see him, to thank him for having managed to get Veli Jože back where he belongs. But when they get close enough to him, they become furious, threatening him. It's not clear to Civetta what's going on, but the moment he turns around, he realizes that Veli Jože has disappeared without a trace.

== Analysis ==
Veli Jože is one of the most famous works of Vladimir Nazor, published in 1908. The story describes the invaluable importance of freedom in the life of every man, including the giant Jože. In addition, it shows greed in giants and "small" people alike, because when one gains freedom and becomes conscious of it, one often forgets what it was like not to have it, stops appreciating what he has, and directs all their energy to wanting to have whatever they don't have.

The importance of this novel is that it emphasizes how much freedom is worth and how when you don't have it for long time and forget about it (or never had it at all), you accept slavery as something normal. Veli Jože hardly remembered freedom, he imagined it, but these were memories from the ancient past, which he probably wasn't even sure were real. He only remembered that it used to be nicer and better. He lived life as a slave, a serf not wondering if he deserved or could have any better. People got used to his help; they ridiculed and exploited him, not realizing how important he was to them and how much his help was worth.

The period in which the story of Jože is set is the period when the Republic of Venice ruled Istria, exploited its goods for centuries, so long that Istria and the Istrians forgot the meaning of freedom and what it's like to be free. The Venetians exploited the land's goods, people and resources, without appreciating them or giving them anything in return. A period in history is thus shown through Jože's life. Although Jože was a very powerful giant, he felt powerless and small before his masters, he did not see his strength and the possibilities he had. The same was with Istria, which obeyed without question, forgetting its value and greatness.

At one point, Jože opened his eyes and realized his situation, that he was trapped and that he was being run by people who were weaker than him. After that he decided to take matters into his own hands, gather giants, people similar to himself and start cultivating his land, start being free. They chose to be their own masters, free and independent of others. Although the giants are uneducated and have no idea right at the beginning what to do, they put their trust into Jože. Jože cares about peace. He gives people gold and silver, not caring about money and wealth, realizing that there is no greater wealth than peace and freedom.

But over time, people manage to bring unrest, simply under the motto divide et impera, and the giants out of greed end up wanting to kill Jože. In this work, the author also shows how people can turn against each other in a cruel way out of greed, out of personal interests. The giants, who united thanks to Jože, his leadership, ideas and vision, turn against him because of money, land and the desire to have more, and in the end they are left with nothing. The fact that in the end they are left with nothing is not surprising, the consequences for greed and ingratitude are always the same.

The story ends in an optimistic way, because despite betrayal and disappointment, Jože emerges victorious, does not allow people to capture him again, remembers freedom and its value, and manages to preserve it.

== Influence and significance ==
Although Nazor was initially critical towards the prose of his own work, Veli Jože became his best known work in Yugoslavia. Several places in Croatia are named after the protagonist. In Poreč, Istria, a street is named after him. The Šibenik based Veli Jože Crane, the largest crane on the Adriatic, which served Yugoslavia and later Croatia in the Croatian War of Independence, is named after Veli Jože.
