= Brkač =

Brkač San Pancrazio di Montona
- Village
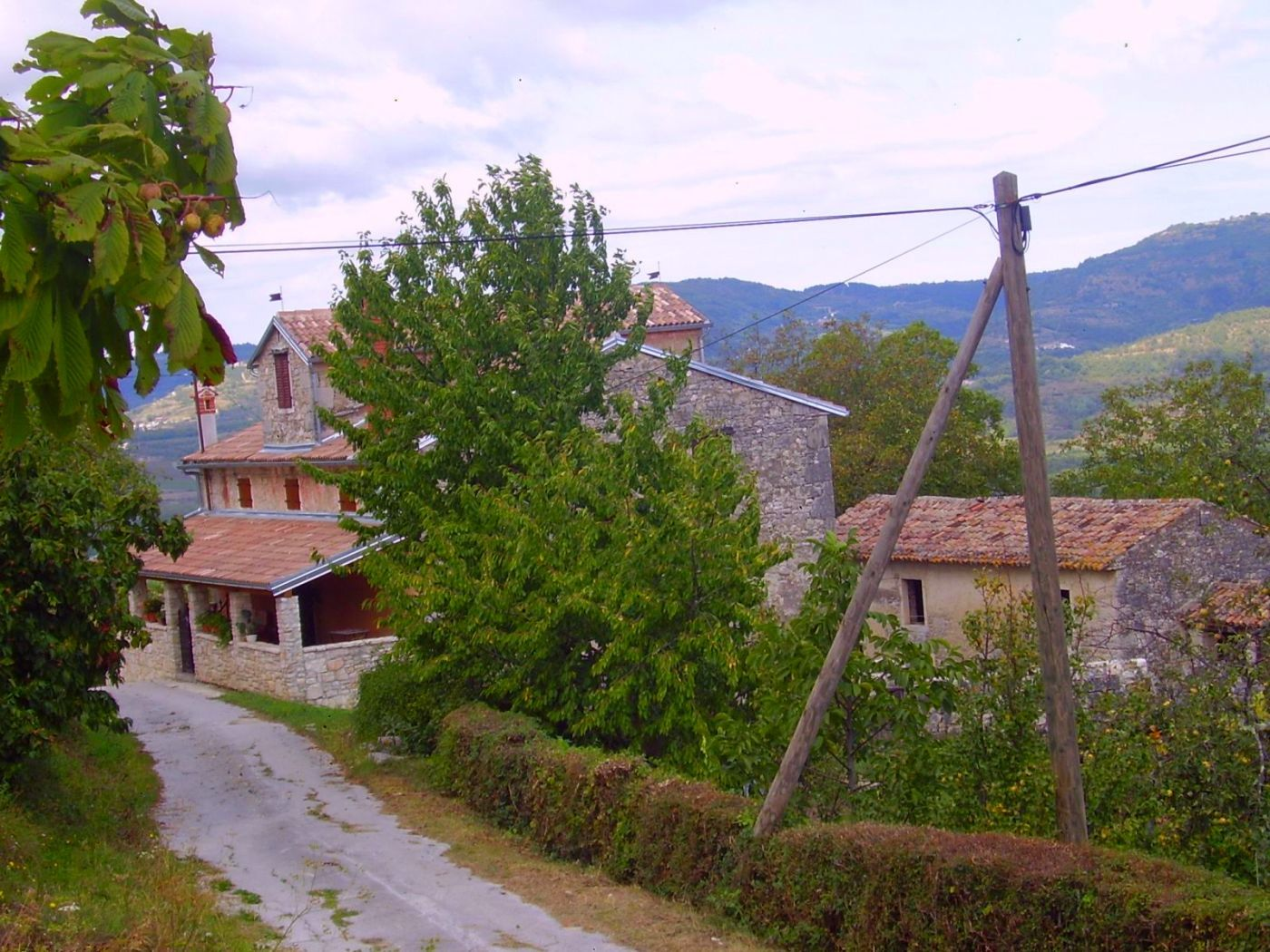

- Location within Croatia
- Coordinates: 45.3322366°N 13.7803153°E
- Country: Croatia
- County: Istria County
- Municipality: Motovun

Area
  - Total: 2.2 sq mi (5.8 km^{2})

Population (2021)
  - Total: 223
  - Density: 100/sq mi (38/km^{2})
- Time zone: UTC+1 (CET)
  - Summer (DST): UTC+2 (CEST)
- Postal code: 52424 Motovun
- Area code: 052

Brkač (Italian: San Pancrazio di Montona) is a village in the municipality of Motovun, Istria in Croatia.

== Demographics ==
According to the 2021 census, its population was 223.
