= Aldo Andretti =

American racing driver (1940–2020)

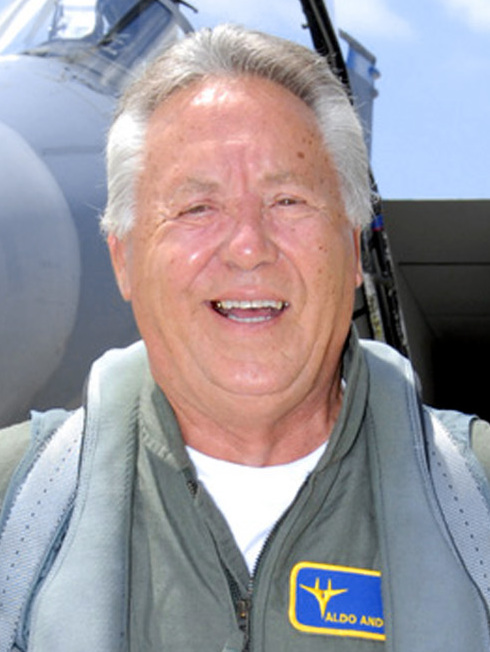
- Andretti in 2007
- Nationality: (United States) American
- Born: February 28, 1940 Montona, Kingdom of Italy (now Motovun, Croatia)
- Died: December 30, 2020 (aged 80) Indianapolis, Indiana, U.S.
- Retired: 1969
- Relatives: Mario Andretti (twin brother); Adam Andretti (son); John Andretti (son); Michael Andretti (nephew); Jeff Andretti (nephew); Marco Andretti (brother's grandson); Jarett Andretti (grandson)

USAC National Sprint Car Championship
- Years active: 1967–1969
- Starts: 16
- Wins: 0
- Poles: 0
- Best finish: 51st in 1967

Aldo Andretti (February 28, 1940 – December 30, 2020) was an American racing driver and entrepreneur, the twin brother of Mario Andretti and the father of John Andretti and Adam Andretti. He was the uncle of Michael Andretti and Jeff Andretti, great-uncle of Marco Andretti, and grandfather of Jarett Andretti. Aldo and Mario were identical twins.

== Background ==
Aldo and Mario were born in Montona, Kingdom of Italy, now Motovun, Croatia, where their father, Gigi, managed a 2,300-acre (930 ha) farm. After World War II Istria became a part of Yugoslavia. His family, like many other Istrian Italians, fled in 1948 during the Istrian–Dalmatian exodus. They lived in a refugee camp in Lucca from 1948 to 1955 until they were able to move to a two-room flat with the help of their uncle Quirino, who was a priest. Quirino would use a motorbike to visit his parishioners and Aldo and Mario would occasionally ride their bike with his tacit approval. In 1954 Aldo and Mario befriended Sergio Seggiolini and Beppe Biagini, who ran an auto-repair shop across the street. The boys would soon perform menial jobs for them, including parking customer cars although they were both underage and did not have a driving license. In 1954 Seggiolini and Biagini expressed their gratitude by taking Aldo and Mario to a trip to the Monza, where they saw Alberto Ascari racing.

In 1956, the family decided to move to the United States and settled in Nazareth, Pennsylvania, where the brothers were able to rekindle their interest in motorsports, when they discovered an oval track in their home town.

== Racing career ==
Aldo and Mario rebuilt a 1948 Hudson Commodore into a stock car in 1959, and began racing it without telling their parents. They flipped a coin to see who would race in the first race. Aldo won the coin toss, the heat race and the feature. They each had two wins after the first four weeks. Aldo fractured his skull in a serious crash near the end of the season. He recovered from his coma, and he returned the following season. Aldo continued racing on the USAC and IMCA circuits; in 1967, a race at Oswego Speedway saw the only occasion where Mario and Aldo raced head to head. Mario won; Aldo, suffering brake failure, finished tenth. Aldo competed in 16 USAC national sprint car races between 1967 and 1969, finishing 51st in points in 1967.

In 1969, Aldo suffered severe damage to his face after crashing during a sprint car race in Des Moines. Flipping end over end and striking the fence, Aldo suffered 14 fractures to his facial bones, and his right eye socket had been shattered. Following his recovery and extensive reconstructive surgery, Aldo quit racing at the request of Mario.

== Post-racing life and death ==
In 1973, Andretti opened a retail business, Andretti Firestone, in Speedway, Indiana. In 1986, he established a precision machine shop for hospital beds and tool manufacturers called Aldo Andretti Machine & Engineering.

Andretti was married, had five children and eleven grandchildren. He died from COVID-19 in Indianapolis, on December 30, 2020, during the COVID-19 pandemic in Indiana.
