= 1969 USAC Championship Car season =

Sports season

- USAC National Championship Trail

Season
- Races: 24
- Start date: March 30
- End date: December 7

Awards
- National champion: (United States) Mario Andretti
- Indianapolis 500 winner: (United States) Mario Andretti

The 1969 USAC Championship Car season consisted of 24 races, beginning in Avondale, Arizona on March 30 and concluding in Riverside, California on December 7. The USAC National Champion and Indianapolis 500 winner was Mario Andretti.

== Schedule and results ==
In the IZOD IndyCar Series 2011 Historical Record Book the winner of the Rex Mays Classic was declared to be only Art Pollard, because Greg Weld vacated the car on lap 2 of 150.

| Rnd | Date | Race name | Track | Location | Type | Pole position | Winning driver |
|---|---|---|---|---|---|---|---|
| 1 | March 30 | (United States) Jimmy Bryan 150 | Phoenix International Raceway | Avondale, Arizona | Paved | (United States) Al Unser | (United States) George Follmer |
| 2 | April 13 | (United States) California 200 | Hanford Motor Speedway | Hanford, California | Paved | (United States) Mario Andretti | (United States) Mario Andretti |
| 3 | May 30 | (United States) International 500 Mile Sweepstakes | Indianapolis Motor Speedway | Speedway, Indiana | Paved | (United States) A. J. Foyt | (United States) Mario Andretti |
| 4 | June 8 | (United States) Rex Mays Classic | Milwaukee Mile | West Allis, Wisconsin | Paved | (United States) Mario Andretti | (United States) Greg Weld; Art Pollard^{A} |
| 5 | June 15 | (United States) Langhorne 150 | Langhorne Speedway | Langhorne, Pennsylvania | Paved | (United States) Mario Andretti | (United States) Bobby Unser |
| 6 | June 29 | (United States) Pikes Peak Auto Hill Climb | Pikes Peak Highway | Pikes Peak, Colorado | Hill | (United States) Orville Nance^{B} | (United States) Mario Andretti |
| 7 | July 6 | (United States) Rocky Mountain 150 | Continental Divide Raceways | Mead, Colorado | Road | (United States) Dan Gurney | (United States) Gordon Johncock |
| 8 | July 12 | (United States) Nazareth 100 | Nazareth Speedway | Nazareth, Pennsylvania | Dirt | (United States) Bill Vukovich II | (United States) Mario Andretti |
| 9 | July 19 | (United States) Trenton 200 | Trenton International Speedway | Trenton, New Jersey | Paved | (United States) Mario Andretti | (United States) Mario Andretti |
| 10 | July 27 | (United States) Indy 200^{C} | Indianapolis Raceway Park | Clermont, Indiana | Road | (United States) Dan Gurney | (United States) Dan Gurney |
| 11 | July 27 | (United States) Indy 200^{C} | Indianapolis Raceway Park | Clermont, Indiana | Road | (United States) Dan Gurney | (United States) Peter Revson |
| 12 | August 17 | (United States) Tony Bettenhausen 200 | Milwaukee Mile | West Allis, Wisconsin | Paved | (United States) Al Unser | (United States) Al Unser |
| 13 | August 18 | (United States) Tony Bettenhausen 100 | Illinois State Fairgrounds | Springfield, Illinois | Dirt | (United States) Greg Weld | (United States) Mario Andretti |
| 14 | August 24 | (United States) Delaware 200 | Dover Downs International Speedway | Dover, Delaware | Paved | (United States) Bobby Unser | (United States) Art Pollard |
| 15 | September 1 | (United States) Ted Horn Memorial | DuQuoin State Fairgrounds | Du Quoin, Illinois | Dirt | (United States) Greg Weld | (United States) Al Unser |
| 16 | September 6 | (United States) Hoosier Hundred | Indiana State Fairgrounds | Indianapolis, Indiana | Dirt | (United States) Greg Weld | (United States) A. J. Foyt |
| 17 | September 14 | (United States) Brainerd 200^{D} | Brainerd International Raceway | Brainerd, Minnesota | Road | (United States) Al Unser | (United States) Gordon Johncock |
| 18 | September 14 | (United States) Brainerd 200^{D} | Brainerd International Raceway | Brainerd, Minnesota | Road | (United States) Gordon Johncock | (United States) Dan Gurney |
| 19 | September 21 | (United States) Trenton 300 | Trenton International Speedway | Trenton, New Jersey | Paved | (United States) Bobby Unser | (United States) Mario Andretti |
| 20 | September 28 | (United States) Golden State 100 | California State Fairgrounds | Sacramento, California | Dirt | (United States) Greg Weld | (United States) Al Unser |
| 21 | October 19 | (United States) Dan Gurney 200^{E} | Pacific Raceways | Kent, Washington | Road | (United States) Dan Gurney | (United States) Mario Andretti |
| 22 | October 19 | (United States) Dan Gurney 200^{E} | Pacific Raceways | Kent, Washington | Road | (United States) Mario Andretti | (United States) Al Unser |
| 23 | November 21 | (United States) Bobby Ball 150 | Phoenix International Raceway | Avondale, Arizona | Paved | (United States) Al Unser | (United States) Al Unser |
| 24 | December 7 | (United States) Rex Mays 300 | Riverside International Raceway | Riverside, California | Road | (United States) Dan Gurney | (United States) Mario Andretti |

Paved/Dirt Oval
Road Course/Hill Climb

^A Pollard was involved in a mechanical failure in a Lap 1 crash. During the red flag, he replaced teammate Greg Weld for the restarted race on Lap 2 of 150.
^B No pole is awarded for the Pikes Peak Hill Climb, in this schedule on the pole is the driver who started first. No lap led was awarded for the Pikes Peak Hill Climb, however, a lap was awarded to the drivers that completed the climb.
^C Run in two heats of 100 miles (160 kilometers) each.
^D Run in two heats of 96.3 miles (155 kilometers) each.
^E Run in two heats of 99 miles (159 kilometers) each.

== Final points standings ==
Note 1: Sam Posey, Mark Donohue, Swede Savage, Peter Revson, John Cannon, Jerry Hansen, David Hobbs, Jack Brabham, Denis Hulme and LeeRoy Yarbrough are not eligible for points.

Note 2: Art Pollard qualified fifth for the Milwaukee event and was eliminated in a 10-car accident at the start of the race. His original car was scored in 15th. Pollard then took over the car of Greg Weld and went on to win the race. Weld gets credit for a start but has no finishing position.

| Pos | Driver | PHX1 (United States) | HAN (United States) | INDY (United States) | MIL1 (United States) | LHS (United States) | PIK (United States) | CDR (United States) | NAZ (United States) | TRE1 (United States) | IRP (United States) | | MIL2 (United States) | SPR (United States) | DOV (United States) | DQSF (United States) | ISF (United States) | BRN (United States) | | TRE2 (United States) | CSF (United States) | SEA (United States) | | PHX2 (United States) | RIV (United States) | Pts |
|---|---|---|---|---|---|---|---|---|---|---|---|---|---|---|---|---|---|---|---|---|---|---|---|---|---|---|
| 1 | (United States) Mario Andretti | 16 | **1** | 1 | **7** | **5** | 1 | 10 | 1 | **1** | 9 | 2 | 4 | 1 | 11 | 2 | 6 | 4 | 3 | 1 | 15 | 1 | **2** | 21 | 1 | 5025 |
| 2 | (United States) Al Unser | **22** | 13 | Wth | | | | 9 | | 25 | 2 | 19 | **1** | 8 | 12 | 1 | 4 | **3** | 9 | 21 | 1 | 2 | 1 | **1** | 2 | 2630 |
| 3 | (United States) Bobby Unser | 8 | 7 | 3 | 16 | 1 | | 16 | | 23 | 24 | | 2 | 10 | **22** | 5 | 3 | 13 | 11 | **7** | 3 | 17 | 5 | 22 | 4 | 2585 |
| 4 | (United States) Dan Gurney | | | 2 | | | | **2** | | | **1** | **21** | | | | | | 2 | 1 | | | **3** | 4 | | **3** | 2280 |
| 5 | (United States) Gordon Johncock | 10 | 3 | 19 | 8 | 20 | | 1 | | 4 | 10 | 14 | 19 | | 2 | | | 1 | **2** | 6 | | | | 10 | 9 | 2070 |
| 6 | (United States) Wally Dallenbach Sr. | 2 | 5 | 21 | 20 | 3 | | 8 | 5 | 2 | DNS | | 18 | 7 | 14 | Wth | DNQ | | | 10 | 9 | | | 3 | 7 | 1795 |
| 7 | (United States) A. J. Foyt | 21 | 25 | **8** | 3 | | | 3 | | 10 | 5 | 4 | 9 | 5 | 19 | 3 | 1 | 8 | 8 | 13 | | | | 25 | DNS | 1570 |
| 8 | (United States) Bill Vukovich II | 4 | 8 | 32 | 17 | 4 | | 19 | **13** | 6 | 22 | | 5 | 3 | | 4 | 14 | DNQ | | 24 | 13 | 9 | 17 | 6 | 27 | 1280 |
| 9 | (United States) Mike Mosley | 6 | 12 | 13 | 6 | 16 | | 14 | | 3 | 19 | | 7 | 17 | 4 | 18 | 17 | 9 | 5 | 23 | 17 | 6 | 9 | 17 | 11 | 1220 |
| 10 | (United States) Lloyd Ruby | 3 | 2 | 20 | 13 | 21 | | | | 15 | 7 | 15 | 3 | | DNQ | | | | | | | | | 2 | DNP | 1190 |
| 11 | (United States) Johnny Rutherford | DNS | 4 | 29 | 5 | 15 | | 11 | | 22 | Wth | | Wth | | 7 | 14 | DNQ | 11 | | 12 | | 19 | | 4 | 5 | 1130 |
| 12 | (United States) Art Pollard | 19 | 15 | 31 | 1 | 2 | | 18 | | DNQ | 25 | 16 | 6 | | 1 | DNQ | 18 | 18 | | 14 | 14 | 18 | 12 | 19 | 16 | 1110 |
| 13 | (United States) Roger McCluskey | 14 | 17 | 14 | 9 | | | 5 | | 21 | 4 | 18 | 14 | 15 | 3 | 16 | 15 | 15 | | 2 | DNQ | | | DNQ | 22 | 1090 |
| 14 | (United States) Gary Bettenhausen | 20 | 10 | 26 | 21 | 6 | | | 2 | 16 | DNQ | | 13 | 6 | 5 | 10 | 2 | | | 19 | 2 | | | 20 | DNQ | 940 |
| 15 | (United States) Bud Tingelstad | | | 15 | 4 | 13 | | DNQ | 4 | 24 | 11 | 5 | 15 | 13 | 15 | DNQ | 9 | | | 3 | DNS | | | 11 | | 920 |
| 16 | (United States) George Follmer | 1 | 9 | 27 | | | | | | | 6 | 3 | 11 | | | | | 6 | 6 | | | 15 | 6 | DNQ | 14 | 880 |
| 17 | (United States) George Snider | | 14 | 16 | DNQ | 9 | | | | 5 | 20 | | 25 | 2 | | 7 | 7 | DNQ | | 5 | DNQ | | | 26 | 18 | 840 |
| 18 | (United States) Jim Malloy | | 6 | 11 | 2 | 7 | | DNS | 12 | DNQ | | | 26 | DNP | 16 | | | | | 18 | | | | 7 | | 780 |
| 19 | (United States) Mel Kenyon | | | 4 | 12 | | | | | | | | 24 | | | | | | | | | | | DNP | | 615 |
| 20 | (United States) Joe Leonard | | | 6 | | | | | | 19 | | | 20 | | 21 | | | | | 27 | | DNS | | 5 | 19 | 600 |
| 21 | (United States) Larry Dickson | | DNP | 9 | 18 | | | | 6 | | | | | 4 | DNQ | 6 | DNQ | | | 22 | 10 | | | 23 | | 510 |
| 22 | (United States) Sam Sessions | DNQ | DNP | 12 | 19 | 10 | | DNQ | 16 | DNQ | 18 | 12 | 23 | 14 | | 12 | DNQ | DNQ | | 4 | | | | 24 | 23 | 475 |
| 23 | (United States) Jim McElreath | DNP | | 28 | | | | | | 7 | 13 | 20 | 8 | DNQ | 18 | 9 | 13 | DNQ | | 11 | 16 | | | 9 | | 400 |
| 24 | (United States) Steve Krisiloff RY | | | | DNQ | 12 | | | | 9 | | | 17 | | 8 | | | | | 8 | | 12 | 15 | 13 | 26 | 355 |
| 25 | (United States) Rick Muther | | | DNQ | 11 | DNQ | | | | | | | 12 | | 6 | | | | | 9 | | | | 18 | 28 | 330 |
| 26 | (United States) Bill Simpson | DNQ | 11 | | DNQ | | | 13 | | | 12 | 8 | 21 | | DNQ | | | 12 | 7 | | | DNQ | | 15 | 8 | 320 |
| 27 | (United States) Jerry Grant | 17 | 19 | DNQ | DNQ | | | 4 | | | DNQ | | | | | | | DNQ | | | | 13 | 11 | DNQ | 10 | 290 |
| 28 | (United States) Bruce Walkup | | | 33 | | 23 | | | | | | | 22 | DNP | DNQ | | 10 | | | | 4 | | | 8 | | 250 |
| 29 | (United States) Bob Harkey | | | | | 8 | | 7 | 11 | | | | | DNQ | | DNQ | 12 | | | | 11 | | | | | 215 |
| 30 | (United States) Greg Weld | 13 | DNS | | 15 | | | | | 8 | | | | **16** | DNS | **17** | **5** | | | | **12** | | | | | 210 |
| 31 | (United States) Max Dudley | 23 | 22 | DNQ | DNQ | | | 6 | | | 17 | 10 | DNQ | | 13 | | | | | DNQ | | 10 | 14 | DNP | 12 | 210 |
| 32 | (United States) Al Smith | | | | 10 | DNQ | | | 8 | 20 | | | 16 | | 9 | | DNQ | | | | | | | | | 175 |
| 33 | (United States) Jerry Daniels | | | | | | | | 3 | | | | | DNQ | | 11 | | | | | | | | | | 160 |
| 34 | (United States) Jigger Sirois | 5 | 18 | DNQ | DNQ | DNS | | | | | | | | | | | | | | 25 | | | | 14 | | 150 |
| 35 | (United States) Bobby Johns | DNP | DNP | 10 | DNQ | DNQ | | | | | | | | | | | | | | | | | | | | 150 |
| 36 | (United States) Carl Williams | | | 25 | | | | | | | | | | 12 | | DNQ | 11 | | | | 5 | | | | | 130 |
| 37 | (United States) Bill Puterbaugh | | | | | | | | | | | | | 9 | | 15 | 16 | | | 16 | 6 | | | 16 | | 120 |
| 38 | (United States) Tom Bigelow | | | | | DNQ | | | 7 | 18 | 21 | 17 | | DNQ | DNQ | 8 | DNQ | | | DNQ | | | | | | 110 |
| 39 | (United States) Arnie Knepper | | | 22 | | DNQ | | 15 | DNQ | DNQ | 26 | 6 | | 11 | | 13 | DNQ | | | | | | | | | 100 |
| 40 | (United States) Dave Strickland R | 7 | 23 | DNQ | | | | | | | | | | | | | | | | | | | | | | 90 |
| 41 | (Canada) Ludwig Heimrath Sr. R | | | | DNQ | DNQ | | 12 | | 14 | 14 | 13 | DNQ | | 17 | | | 19 | | 28 | | 8 | 13 | DNQ | 15 | 65 |
| 42 | (United States) Sonny Ates | | | 17 | 22 | 24 | | | | 12 | | | 10 | | | | | | | | | | | | | 61 |
| 43 | (United States) Johnny Parsons R | | | DNQ | | | | | | | | | | | | | | | | | 7 | | | DNQ | 30 | 60 |
| 44 | (United States) Al Loquasto R | | | | 23 | 14 | | | 9 | 13 | 16 | 11 | | | 20 | | | DNS | | 26 | | | | DNQ | | 60 |
| 45 | (United States) Keith Rachwitz | 9 | 16 | | | | | | | | | | | | | | | | | | | | | | | 60 |
| 46 | (United States) Jerry Karl R | | | | | | | | | | | | | | 10 | | | | | 15 | | | | DNP | | 60 |
| 47 | (United States) Ralph Liguori | | | | | | | | | | | | | 18 | | DNQ | 8 | | | | | | | | | 50 |
| 48 | (United States) Johnny Anderson R | | | | | | | | | | | | | | | | | | | | 8 | | | DNQ | | 50 |
| 49 | (United States) Don Schisler R | | | | | | | | | | 15 | 9 | | | | | | | | | | | | | | 40 |
| 50 | (United States) Les Scott R | | | DNQ | DNQ | | | | | 11 | 23 | | DNQ | | | | | | | 20 | | | | | | 40 |
| 51 | (United States) Don Nordhorn R | | | | | | | | 10 | | | | | DNQ | | | DNQ | | | | | | | | | 30 |
| 53 | (United States) Denny Zimmerman | 11 | DNP | DNQ | DNQ | | | | | | | | | | | | | | | | | | | | | 30 |
| 52 | (United States) Bobby Grim | | | | DNQ | 11 | | | | | | | | | | | | | | | | | | | | 30 |
| 54 | (United States) Ted Foltz | | | | | | 2 | | | | | | | | | | | | | | | | | | | 24 |
| 55 | (United States) Wes Vandervoort | | | | | | 3 | | | | | | | | | | | | | | | | | | | 21 |
| 56 | (United States) Bob Gregg R | | | | | | | | | | | | | | | | | | | | | 11 | 16 | DNQ | 13 | 20 |
| 57 | (United States) Lee Kunzman R | | | | | | | | | | | | | DNQ | | | DNQ | | | | | | | 12 | | 20 |
| 58 | (United States) Bob Herring | | | | | | 4 | | | | | | | | | | | | | | | | | | | 18 |
| 59 | (United States) Malcolm Brazier | | | | | | 5 | | | | | | | | | | | | | | | | | | | 15 |
| 60 | (Canada) George Fejer | 12 | DNP | | | | | | | | | | | | | | | | | | | | | | | 15 |
| 61 | (United States) Charles Louderman | | | | | | 6 | | | | | | | | | | | | | | | | | | | 12 |
| 62 | (United States) Grier Manning | | | | | | 7 | | | | | | | | | | | | | | | | | | | 9 |
| 63 | (United States) Clark Yowell | | | | | | 8 | | | | | | | | | | | | | | | | | | | 8 |
| 64 | (United States) Bob Daly | | | | | | 9 | | | | | | | | | | | | | | | | | | | 6 |
| 65 | (United States) Jack Guynn R | | | | | | 10 | | | | | | | | | | | | | | | | | | | 4 |
| 66 | (United States) Rick Vermillion | | | | | | 18 | | | | | | | | | | | | | | | | | | | 3 |
| 67 | (United States) James Byrd R | | | | | | 16 | | | | | | | | | | | | | | | | | | | 2 |
| - | (United States) Peter Revson | | | 5 | | | | | | | 3 | 1 | | | | | | | | | | | | | DNP | 0 |
| - | (United States) Sam Posey R | | | DNQ | | | | | | | 8 | 7 | | | | | | 16 | | | | 4 | 3 | | 25 | 0 |
| - | (United States) Mark Donohue | | | 7 | | | | | | | DNQ | | | | | | | 7 | 4 | | | 16 | | | 21 | 0 |
| - | (United States) Swede Savage R | | | | | | | | | | | | | | | | | 5 | | | | 14 | 7 | | 6 | 0 |
| - | (Canada) John Cannon | | | | | | | | | | | | | | | | | | | | | 5 | 10 | DNQ | 29 | 0 |
| - | (United States) Jerry Hansen R | | | | | | | | | | | | | | | | | 17 | | | | 7 | 8 | | DNQ | 0 |
| - | (United Kingdom) David Hobbs R | | | | | | | | | | | | | | | | | 10 | 10 | | | | | | | 0 |
| - | (United States) Orville Nance | | | | | | **11** | | | | | | | | | | | | | | | | | | | 0 |
| - | (United States) Gene Pacheco | | | | | | 12 | | | | | | | | | | | | | | | | | | | 0 |
| - | (United States) Butch Earley | | | | | | 13 | | | | | | | | | | | | | | | | | | | 0 |
| - | (United States) Jim Reynard R | | | | | DNQ | | | 14 | DNQ | | | | DNP | DNQ | | DNP | | | | | | | | | 0 |
| - | (United States) George Benson | | | DNQ | 14 | | | | | | | | | | | | | | | | | | | | | 0 |
| - | (United States) LaVerne Ravenstein | | | | | | 14 | | | | | | | | | | | | | | | | | | | 0 |
| - | (United States) Hamilton Vose R | | | | | | | | | | | | | | | | | 14 | | | | | | | | 0 |
| - | (United States) Rollie Beale | | | | | 19 | | | 15 | DNP | | | | DNQ | | DNQ | DNQ | | | | | | | | | 0 |
| - | (United States) Dempsey Wilson | 15 | 20 | | | DNQ | | | | DNQ | | | | | | | | | | | | | | | | 0 |
| - | (United States) Ralph Murdock R | | | | | | 15 | | | | | | | | | | | | | | | | | | | 0 |
| - | (United States) Charlie Masters R | | | | | | | | | 17 | | | DNS | | | | | | | 17 | | | | | | 0 |
| - | (United States) Todd Gibson | | | | 24 | 17 | | | | DNQ | DNP | | DNQ | | | | | DNQ | | | | | | | | 0 |
| - | (United States) Ronnie Bucknum | DNP | DNP | 30 | | | | | | | | | | | | | | | | | | DNP | | DNQ | 17 | 0 |
| - | (United States) Wib Spalding | | DNQ | | | DNQ | | 17 | | | DNP | | DNQ | | DNQ | DNQ | | | | | | | | | | 0 |
| - | (United States) Larry Overholser | | | | | | 17 | | | | | | | | | | | | | | | | | | | 0 |
| - | (United States) Tommy Copp | 18 | DNQ | | | | | | | | | | | | | | | | | | 18 | | | DNQ | | 0 |
| - | (United States) Gig Stephens | | | | | 18 | | | | | | | | | DNQ | | | | | DNQ | | | | | | 0 |
| - | (New Zealand) Denny Hulme | | | 18 | | | | | | | | | | | | | | | | | | | | | | 0 |
| - | (United States) Lou Sell | | | | | | | | | | | | | | | | | | | | | | | | 20 | 0 |
| - | (United States) Earl Smith R | DNS | 21 | | | | | | | | | | | | | | | | | | | | | DNQ | | 0 |
| - | (United States) Mickey Shaw | | | | | 22 | | | | | | | | | | | | | | | | | | | | 0 |
| - | (United States) LeeRoy Yarbrough | | | 23 | | | | | | | | | | | | | | | | | | | | | | 0 |
| - | (United States) Ned Spath R | DNQ | 24 | | | DNQ | | | | DNQ | | | | | | | | | | | | | | DNQ | | 0 |
| - | (United States) Ed Marshall R | | | | | | | | | | | | | | | | | | | | | | | DNQ | 24 | 0 |
| - | (Australia) Jack Brabham | | | 24 | | | | | | | | | | | | | | | | | | | | | | 0 |
| - | (United States) Bob Pratt | | | | | | | | | 26 | | | | | | | | | | | | | | | | 0 |
| - | (United States) Dick Simon | | | | | | | | | | | | | | | | | | | | | DNS | | DNQ | DNQ | 0 |
| - | (United States) Cy Fairchild | | | DNQ | DNQ | | | | | | | | | | | | | | | | | | | | | 0 |
| - | (United States) Charlie Glotzbach | | | DNQ | DNQ | | | | | | | | | | | | | | | | | | | | | 0 |
| - | (United States) Dee Jones | | | DNQ | DNQ | | | | | | | | | | | | | | | | | | | | | 0 |
| - | (United States) Roger West | | | DNQ | | | | | | | | | | DNQ | | | | | | | | | | | | 0 |
| - | (United States) Chuck Booth | | | DNQ | | | | | | | | | | | | | DNQ | | | | | | | | | 0 |
| - | (United States) Bobby Hogle | | | | | | | | | | | | | | | DNQ | DNQ | | | | | | | | | 0 |
| - | (United States) Karl Busson | | | | | | | | | | | | | | | | | | | | | | | DNP | DNQ | 0 |
| - | (United States) Bud Morley | DNQ | | | | | | | | | | | | | | | | | | | | | | | | 0 |
| - | (United States) Jim Hurtubise | | | DNQ | | | | | | | | | | | | | | | | | | | | | | 0 |
| - | (United States) Al Miller | | | DNQ | | | | | | | | | | | | | | | | | | | | | | 0 |
| - | (Germany) Lothar Motschenbacher | | | DNQ | | | | | | | | | | | | | | | | | | | | | | 0 |
| - | (United States) Bob Veith | | | DNQ | | | | | | | | | | | | | | | | | | | | | | 0 |
| - | (United States) Merle Bettenhausen | | | | | | | | | | | | | | | | DNQ | | | | | | | | | 0 |
| - | (United States) Dale Breedlove | | | | | | | | | | | | | | | | | | | | | | | | DNQ | 0 |
| - | (Italy) Dino Dioguardi | | | | | | | | | | | | | | | | | | | | | | | | DNQ | 0 |
| - | (Italy) Nick Dioguardi | | | | | | | | | | | | | | | | | | | | | | | | DNQ | 0 |
| - | (United States) Scott Carr | | | Wth | | | | | | | | | | | | | | | | | | | | | | 0 |
| - | (United Kingdom) Graham Hill | | | Wth | | | | | | | | | | | | | | | | | | | | | | 0 |
| - | (Austria) Jochen Rindt | | | Wth | | | | | | | | | | | | | | | | | | | | | | 0 |
| - | (United States) Bob West | | | | | | | | | | | | | | | | | | | | | | | | DNQ | 0 |
| - | (United States) Pat O'Reilly | | | DNP | | | | | | | | | | | | | | | | | | | | | | 0 |
| - | (United States) Jimmy Maguire | | | | DNP | | | | | | | | | | | | | | | | | | | | | 0 |
| - | (United States) Joe Lehman | | | | | | DNP | | | | | | | | | | | | | | | | | | | 0 |
| - | (United States) Roger Veys | | | | | | DNP | | | | | | | | | | | | | | | | | | | 0 |
| - | (United States) Eugene Willbanks | | | | | | DNP | | | | | | | | | | | | | | | | | | | 0 |
| - | (United States) Steve Diulo | | | | | | | | | | | | | | | | | | | | | | | | DNP | 0 |
| - | (Canada) George Eaton | | | | | | | | | | | | | | | | | | | | | | | | DNP | 0 |
| Pos | Driver | PHX1 (United States) | HAN (United States) | INDY (United States) | MIL1 (United States) | LHS (United States) | PIK (United States) | CDR (United States) | NAZ (United States) | TRE1 (United States) | IRP1 (United States) | IRP2 (United States) | MIL2 (United States) | SPR (United States) | DOV (United States) | DQSF (United States) | ISF (United States) | BRN1 (United States) | BRN2 (United States) | TRE2 (United States) | CSF (United States) | SEA1 (United States) | SEA2 (United States) | PHX2 (United States) | RIV (United States) | Pts |

| Color | Result |
|---|---|
| Gold | Winner |
| Silver | 2nd place |
| Bronze | 3rd place |
| Green | 4th & 5th place |
| Light Blue | 6th-10th place |
| Dark Blue | Finished (Outside Top 10) |
| Purple | Did not finish (Ret) |
| Red | Did not qualify (DNQ) |
| Brown | Withdrawn (Wth) |
| Black | Disqualified (DSQ) |
| White | Did not start (DNS) |
| Blank | Did not participate (DNP) |
| Blank | Not competing |

**In-line notation**
| **Bold** | Pole position |
| Italics | Ran fastest race lap |
| * | Led most race laps |
RY Rookie of the Year
R Rookie

== See also ==
- 1969 Indianapolis 500
