= 1972 Indianapolis 500 =

American motor race

56th Indianapolis 500
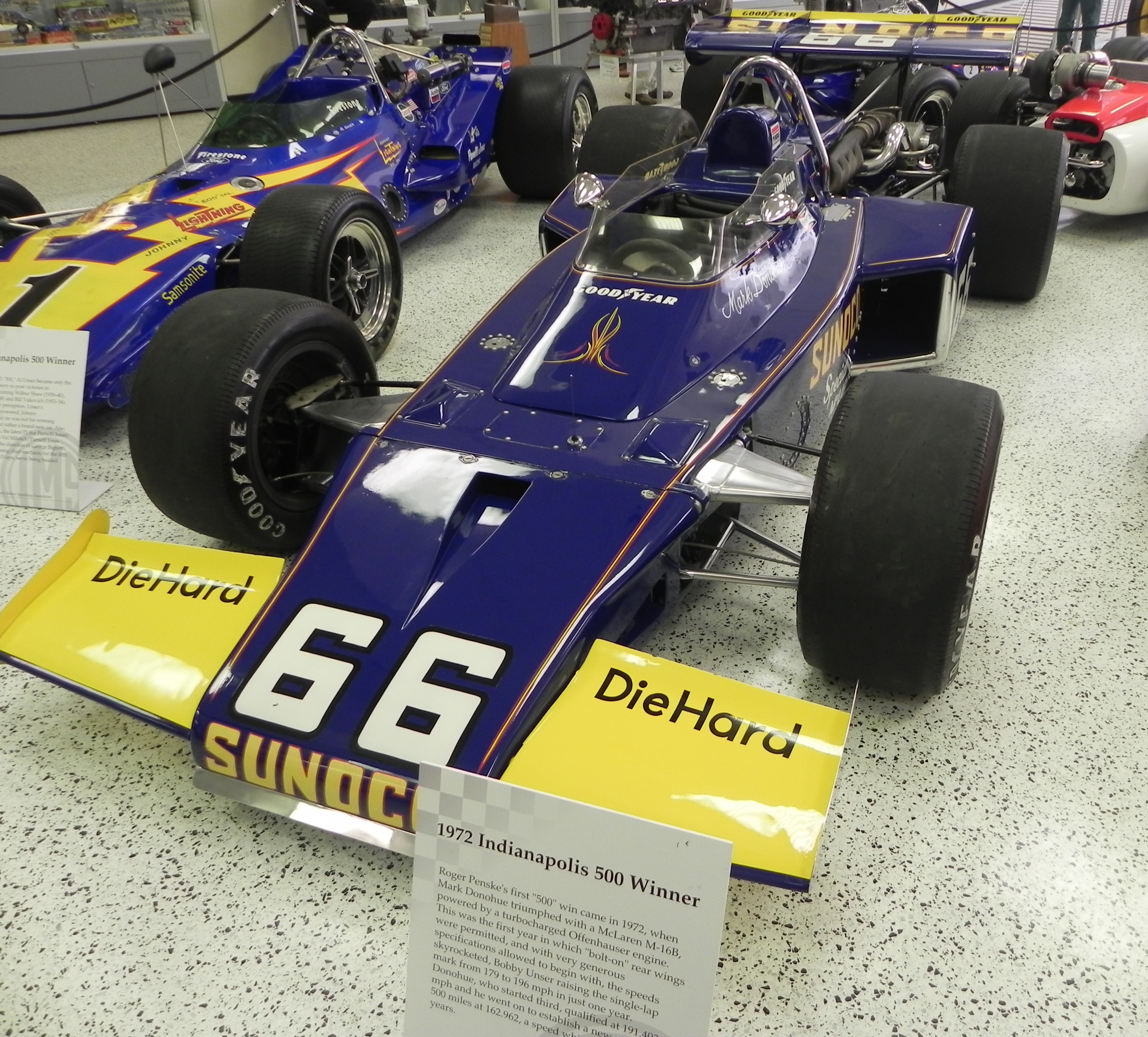

Indianapolis Motor Speedway

Indianapolis 500
- Sanctioning body: USAC
- Season: 1972 USAC Trail
- Date: May 27, 1972
- Winner: Mark Donohue
- Winning team: Penske Racing
- Winning Chief Mechanic: Karl Kainhofer
- Time of race: 3:04:05.54
- Average speed: 162.962 mph (262.262 km/h)
- Pole position: Bobby Unser
- Pole speed: 195.940 mph (315.335 km/h)
- Fastest qualifier: Bobby Unser
- Rookie of the Year: Mike Hiss
- Most laps led: Gary Bettenhausen (138)

Pre-race ceremonies
- National anthem: Purdue Band
- "Back Home Again in Indiana": Jim Nabors
- Starting command: Tony Hulman
- Pace car: Hurst/Olds Cutlass
- Pace car driver: Jim Rathmann
- Starter: Pat Vidan
- Estimated attendance: 275,000

Television in the United States
- Network: ABC
- Announcers: Jim McKay, Jackie Stewart

Chronology
Previous	Next
1971	1973

The 56th 500 Mile International Sweepstakes was held at the Indianapolis Motor Speedway in Speedway, Indiana, on Saturday, May 27, 1972. The race is notable in that for the first time, the cars were permitted bolt-on wings, and speeds climbed dramatically. Bobby Unser won the pole position with a four-lap average speed of 195.940 mph (315.3 km/h), breaking Peter Revson's track record from 1971 by over 17 mph – the largest one-year track record increase in Indy history. The race average speed of 162.962 mph (262.3 km/h) was also a new record, which stood until 1984.

Gary Bettenhausen led 138 laps (of 200) until his car suffered ignition trouble on lap 176. He coasted to the pits and wound up 14th. Jerry Grant took over the lead, but pitted for a new tire and fuel on lap 188 in teammate Bobby Unser's pit – for which he was later disqualified. Bettenhausen's Penske teammate Mark Donohue won the race, after leading only the final 13 laps. It was car owner Roger Penske's first of twenty Indy 500 victories (as of 2026) and the first victory for a McLaren chassis at Indy. Al Unser Sr., who won the race in 1970–1971, was looking to become the first driver in history to "three-peat" at the Indianapolis 500. He fell short, but his runner-up finish ties for the best three-year span (1st–1st–2nd) in Indy history.

For the first time, Jim Nabors was invited to sing "Back Home Again in Indiana" during the pre-race ceremonies. Nabors accepted and performed with little rehearsal and was warmly received. It was the beginning of a 36-year tradition, where Nabors performed nearly every year from 1972 through 2014.

The 1972 race was the first to utilize the Electro-PACER Light system to facilitate the yellow light caution periods. Speedway officials still did not utilize the pace car during cautions, and this enforcement tool would be used at Indy for seven years, albeit not without controversy in subsequent races. This system was similar in concept to the Virtual Safety Car and the "Slow zone" that became popular in the 2010s. However, the technology for the PACER system was primitive compared to the later systems used decades later, and proved difficult to enforce.

After the decade of the 1960s saw numerous drivers from Europe and other nationalities, the 1972 race was the first since 1962 and the most-recent to have an all-American lineup. Mario Andretti who was born in Istria (part of Italy at the time) was the only foreign-born driver, however he was a naturalized U.S. citizen at the time of this race.

== Race schedule ==
Following the pattern set in 1970 and 1971, the race was scheduled for the Saturday of Memorial Day weekend. This would be the final Indy 500 scheduled for a Saturday (the 1986 race was held on a Saturday due to a week-long rain delay). Falling on May 27, it was also the earliest calendar date that race had been held up to that point. In 1973, the race would be scheduled for Monday, and starting in 1974, the race would permanently move to the Sunday of Memorial Day weekend.

On Sunday May 28, the annual 500 Victory Banquet was held at the newly completed Indiana Convention Center for the first time.

Race schedule — April/May, 1972
Sun	Mon	Tue	Wed	Thu	Fri	Sat
23	24	25	26	27	28	29; Practice
30; Practice	1 Practice	2 Practice	3 Practice	4 Practice	5 Practice	6 Practice
7 Practice	8 Practice	9 Practice	10; Practice	11; Practice	12; Practice	13; Pole Day
14; Time Trials	15; Practice	16; Practice	17; Practice	18; Practice	19; Practice	20; Time Trials
21; Bump Day	22	23	24; Carb Day	25	26; Parade	27; Indy 500
28	29; Memorial Day	30	31			

Color	Notes
Green	Practice
Dark Blue	Time trials
Silver	Race day
Red	Rained out*
Blank	No track activity

* Includes days where track
activity was significantly
limited due to rain

== Practice and time trials ==
In 1972, for the first time, USAC allowed bolt-on wings to be affixed the cars. Previously, "wings" were required to be integral parts of the car's bodywork. Downforce levels increased by significant margins, and speeds climbed substantially during practice. During a tire test in March, Bobby Unser reportedly drove a lap of 190.8 mph, the first driver ever to lap the Speedway unofficially at over 190 mph.

The existing official track record going into the month had been set by Peter Revson in 1971 at 179.354 mph. During the first week of practice, the stage was set for record speeds early on. During the first day the track was available, Sunday April 30, Jim Malloy became the first driver to break the 180 mph barrier in practice, at 181.415 mph. Later in the week, Malloy ran a practice lap of 188.048 mph, by far an unofficial track record. By the end of the first week of practice, 11 drivers had practiced over 180 mph.

During the second week of practice, Gary Bettenhausen turned a lap of 190.315 mph on Sunday May 7. He became the first driver ever of the month to break 190 mph. Two days later, Bettenhausen was over 191 mph. Not to be upstaged, on Wednesday May 10, Bobby Unser blistered the track at 194.721 mph.

By the eve of pole day, three drivers had cracked the 190 mph barrier in practice, and more than a dozen had practiced faster than the existing qualifying record.

=== First day time trials – Saturday May 13 ===
Pole day time trials were scheduled for Saturday May 13, however, rain kept the track closed most of the day. The track opened briefly for practice, and at 5:50 p.m. time trials began. Three cars made it on the track, but none of them completed runs. A. J. Foyt was the last car out, but he blew his engine in turn two right after taking the green flag.

=== Second day time trials – Sunday May 14 ===
Pole qualifying was moved into Sunday, and the qualifying line picked up where it had left off the day before. The track opened for practice promptly at 9 a.m. At 10:21 a.m., Jim Malloy slid high exiting turn 3, and hit the outside wall in the north short chute. He suffered fractured arms and legs, burns, and was in critical condition. Four days later, Malloy would die from his injuries.

After the Malloy crash, rain closed the track until 2:30 p.m. Bill Vukovich II was the first driver to make a qualifying attempt. His first lap of 185.797 mph was a new one-lap track record, and the first official lap at Indy over 180 mph. However, he did a 360° spin in turn one, and came to rest against the outside wall on the second lap, and the run was for naught. Mike Mosley went out next, but the car quit on the final lap. More rain fell, and the track closed for another hour to wait out the shower.

At 4:15 p.m., Joe Leonard (185.223 mph) became the first driver to complete a qualifying run. He set one and four-lap records, but they would not last long. Mario Andretti (187.617 mph) was the next car out, and he took over the top spot temporarily, also breaking the track record in the process.

Shortly before 5 p.m., Bobby Unser took to the track. He set new all-time one and four-lap qualifying records, becoming the first driver to officially break the 190 mph barrier at Indianapolis.

- Lap 1 – 46.17 seconds, 194.932 mph (new 1-lap track record)
- Lap 2 – 45.91 seconds, 196.036 mph (new 1-lap track record)
- Lap 3 – 45.76 seconds, 196.678 mph (new 1-lap track record)
- Lap 4 – 45.89 seconds, 196.121 mph
- Total – 3:03.73, 195.940 mph (new 4-lap track record)

Unser established himself as the man to beat for the pole position. He shattered the previous year's track record by over 17 mph. Twelve cars completed runs and the 6 o'clock gun closed the track with six cars still left in line. The pole position round would be stretched into the following weekend. Among those not yet on the track were Mark Donohue and Peter Revson. After blowing his engine Saturday, A. J. Foyt was ineligible for the pole, and was not yet in the field either.

=== Third Day – Saturday May 20 ===
Six cars entered the day still eligible for the pole round, and five of those made attempts. Mark Donohue put himself on the front row with a run of 191.408 mph. Moments later, Peter Revson put himself second with a run of 192.885 mph. Bobby Unser held on to the pole position, and the front of the field was set. For the first time since 1940–1941, the same three drivers qualified on the front row in consecutive years. Unser, Revson, and Donohue started on the front row (albeit in different order) in 1971 as well.

At 11:30 a.m., "third day" qualifying commenced. A. J. Foyt put his car solidly in the field with 188.996 mph. Two-time defending race winner Al Unser, Sr. also qualified. The fastest of the "third day" qualifiers would be Jerry Grant, with a run of 189.294 mph.

At the end of the day, the field was filled to 27 cars.

=== Bump Day – Sunday May 21 (Jim Hurtubise "Beer engine") ===
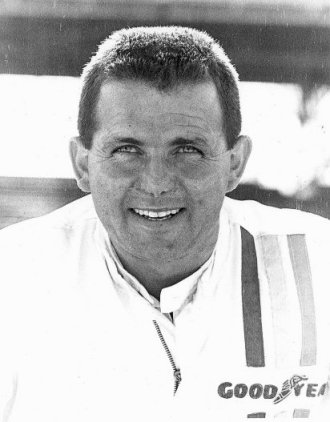
Jim Hurtubise

After blowing five engines during the month, Gordon Johncock finally put a car in the field. His speed of 188.511 mph would be the fastest of the day (8th-fastest overall), and he qualified in 26th.

At 5 p.m., Salt Walther filled the field to 33 cars. Wally Dallenbach (178.423 mph) was now on the bubble. Dallenbach survived three attempts, but was eventually bumped by Cale Yarborough with a half-hour remaining. Yarborough (178.864 mph) beat Dallenbach's time by a mere 0.50 seconds, however, Yarborough himself was now on the bubble. An agonizing final 25 minutes saw six drivers try to bump him out. One by one, they each fell short. Seconds before the 6 o'clock gun, Wally Dallenbach got in a back-up car for one last chance. His first two laps were just shy of bumping in, and on his third lap, the car began smoking. He was forced to pull into the pits and wave off the run. The field was set with Yarborough holding on to make the field. All 33 cars in the field qualified faster than the pole car from the previous year.

As the attention on the track was focusing on Cale Yarborough, Jim Hurtubise wheeled front-engined Mallard roadster in to the qualifying line shortly before the closing deadline of 6 p.m. The car was sponsored by Gohr Distributing, a Buffalo-area beer distributor for various brands of beer, and they promoted the Miller High Life brand on the car.

Since Hurtubise had already qualified himself, when asked why he was putting the car in line, he claimed he 'might put someone else in it,' a practice that was commonplace at the time. Hurtubise had become known for last-minute (unsuccessful) qualifying efforts in his obsolete front-engined roadster, usually to the delight of fans, but sometimes drawing the ire of others. Time expired before the Mallard got anywhere near the front of the line. In fact, Hurtubise queued the car late on purpose, as he did not want it to make it to the front. With qualifying officially concluded, the engine cover was removed to reveal that car had no engine. Instead it had a plastic-lined trough filled with ice and a number of chilled bottles of his sponsor's product, which he shared with the other pit crews and race officials.

Many in attendance found the gesture humorous, however, some officials were not amused. Some had even become skeptical before he opened the cover, as melting ice was already creating a pool of water underneath the car. It was the first of several run-ins Hurtubise would have with USAC officials, and prompted rule changes to prevent another such ruse. (In modern times, alcohol is prohibited in the pit area owing to WADA Code that prohibits alcohol among participants in motorsport events.)

As a result, cars are now subject to cursory inspection, even before arriving at the official technical inspection area, and must obtain a sticker from officials to notify officials the car has been approved before entering the qualifying line.

=== Carburetion Day ===
During practice on May 16, Art Pollard wrecked his qualified car. The team was forced to replace it with a back-up car. Pollard, however, suffered a fractured leg, and was out for the remainder of the month. The team hired Wally Dallenbach (who had been bumped) to drive as a substitute. For race day, the car was moved to the 33rd starting position due to the car/driver change.

The final practice session was scheduled for Wednesday May 24 from 1-4 p.m. Gordon Johncock (186.4 mph) was the fastest car of the day. No accidents were reported, and two drivers (John Mahler and Carl Williams) skipped the session altogether.

==== Electro-PACER Light System / Rule changes ====
The Carburetion Day practice session was expanded to allow the drivers more opportunity to practice under the new Electro-PACER Light system. The new devices were installed around the track to facilitate enforcement of the caution periods. At the time, the pace car was not utilized during caution periods, nor did the field pack up under yellow.

The PACER system featured a series of eight message panels situated around the track at equal intervals. They were programmed to enforce an 80 mph speed limit during caution periods. Drivers were instructed to hold their position under yellow, and each message board around the track would display a number from 1 to 9, illustrating the gap between themselves and the car in front of him. The goal and the requirement was to keep the numbers consistent at all of the boards around the entire circuit. For instance, if a driver saw a "7" on the first board he encountered, he was to drive at such a speed that would display a "7" at all of the boards around the circuit for the remainder of the caution period. If he saw a "6" on the next board, it indicated that he was going too fast, and he would have to slow down a bit. If it displayed an "8" on the next board, that meant he was driving too slow, and needed to speed up slightly. In addition to the digits, three small indicator lights were added on the top of each board - each representing a 1/4 fraction of a digit - to allow for "fine tuning" of the gaps. Officials were stationed around the track to observe and issue penalties for violating the PACER system, which could mean a one-lap penalty for repeated abuse.

The Electro-PACER Light system would be used at Indianapolis from 1972 through 1978. Despite its seemingly simple format and instructions, it would be the source of ire and controversy during the years that it was used. Some drivers discovered and exploited loopholes in the system, and officials would find it more difficult to police than they expected. The PACER system would be a primitive precursor to later systems such as the Virtual Safety Car and "Slow Zones" introduced in the 2010s in Formula One and at Le Mans, respectively. In the end, the drivers themselves lobbied for the pack-up rule during caution periods, and it was finally adopted in 1979.

One additional rule change for 1972 involved the mandatory pit stops. A minimum of four pit stops (fuel hookup required) was required for 1972. The change was up from two pit stops in 1965–1967, and up from three in 1968–1971. Individual tire changes were still optional, but the rapidly increasing speeds from 1972 on would generate greater tire wear. As a result, tire changes became increasingly necessary and more common. Several drivers won the race in the 1960s without changing any tires, but no longer would that be practical nor feasible.

== Qualifying chronology ==
Att #	Time	Qual Day	Car #	Driver Name	Laps	Qual Time	Qual Speed	Rank	Start	Comment
Saturday, May 13, 1972
1	17:50	1	17	Denny Zimmerman	0	—	—	—	—	
2	17:53	1	14	Roger McCluskey	0	—	—	—	—	
3	17:57	1	2	A. J. Foyt	0	—	—	—	—	blown engine
Sunday May 14, 1972
4	14:38	1	4	Al Unser	0	—	—	—	—	blown engine
5	14:46	1	3	Billy Vukovich II	1	—	—	—	—	accident
6	15:08	1	98	Mike Mosley	3	—	—	—	—	pulled off
7	16:14	1	1	Joe Leonard	4	3:14.36	185.223	10	6	
8	16:19	1	9	Mario Andretti	4	3:11.88	187.617	9	5	
9	16:25	1	18	Johnny Rutherford	4	3:16.47	183.234	14	8	
10	16:31	1	44	Dick Simon	0	—	—	—	—	
11	16:36	1	52	Sam Sessions	3	—	—	—	—	
12	16:43	1	7	Gary Bettenhausen	4	3:10.60	188.877	6	4	
13	16:49	1	6	Bobby Unser	4	3:03.73	195.940	1	1	
14	16:56	1	34	Sam Posey	4	3:15.25	184.379	12	7	
15	17:01	1	72	Mike Hiss	0	—	—	—	—	
16	17:05	1	40	Art Pollard	4	3:18.21	181.626	18	33	driver injured; replaced by Wally Dallenbach
17	17:19	1	5	Lloyd Ruby	4	3:18.44	181.415	20	11	
18	17:24	1	95	Carl Williams	0	—	—	—	—	
19	17:27	1	21	Cale Yarborough	0	—	—	—	—	
20	17:31	1	10	Wally Dallenbach	0	—	—	—	—	flagged off
21	17:40	1	10	Wally Dallenbach	4	3:21.77	178.421	—	—	bumped by #21
22	17:46	1	42	Swede Savage	4	3:18.10	181.726	17	9	
23	17:55	1	89	John Martin	4	3:20.43	179.614	28	14	
24	17:59	1	56	Jim Hurtubise	4	3:18.84	181.050	22	13	
Saturday May 20, 1972
25	11:02	1	15	Steve Krisiloff	4	3:18.42	181.433	19	10	
26	11:07	1	23	Mel Kenyon	4	3:18.47	181.388	21	12	
27	11:13	1	66	Mark Donohue	4	3:08.08	191.408	3	3	
28	11:22	1	58	Jerry Karl	0	—	—	—	—	
29	11:23	1	12	Peter Revson	4	3:06.64	192.885	2	2	
30	11:30	3	2	A. J. Foyt	4	3:10.48	188.996	5	16	
31	11:36	3	14	Roger McCluskey	4	3:17.06	182.685	15	20	
32	11:43	3	4	Al Unser	4	3:16.06	183.617	13	19	
33	11:49	3	84	George Snider	4	3:17.96	181.855	16	21	
34	11:55	3	52	Sam Sessions	4	3:19.54	180.415	26	24	
35	12:02	3	95	Carl Williams	1	—	—	—	—	waved off
36	12:08	3	31	John Mahler	2	—	—	—	—	blown engine
37	12:13	3	98	Mike Mosley	4	3:10.63	188.848	7	17	
38	12:20	3	3	Billy Vukovich II	4	3:14.79	184.814	11	18	
39	12:28	3	48	Jerry Grant	4	3:10.18	189.294	4	15	
40	12:41	3	24	Gordon Johncock	3	—	—	—	—	pulled off
41	12:57	3	60	Mike Hiss	4	3:21.10	179.015	31	25	
42	17:20	3	95	Carl Williams	4	3:19.48	180.469	24	22	
43	17:52	3	44	Dick Simon	4	3:19.53	180.424	25	23	
Sunday May 21, 1972
44	12:02	3	24	Gordon Johncock	4	3:10.97	188.511	8	26	
45	12:11	4	37	Lee Kunzman	4	3:20.82	179.265	30	30	
46	12:17	4	11	Jimmy Caruthers	4	3:21.23	178.900	32	31	
47	12:27	4	31	John Mahler	4	3:20.56	179.497	29	29	
48	14:43	4	17	Denny Zimmerman	4	3:19.77	180.207	27	28	
49	16:47	4	58	Jerry Karl	0	—	—	—	—	
50	16:53	4	21	Cale Yarborough	3	—	—	—	—	waved off
51	16:56	4	33	Salt Walther	4	3:19.40	180.542	23	27	
52	17:06	4	90	Arnie Knepper	1	—	—	—	—	blown engine
53	17:20	4	19	Larry Dickson	0	—	—	—	—	
54	17:24	4	99	Jerry Karl	0	—	—	—	—	
55	17:29	3	21	Cale Yarborough	4	3:21.27	178.864	33	32	bumps #10
56	17:34	4	16	Jerry Karl	0	—	—	—	—	
57	17:39	4	36	Bentley Warren	3	—	—	—	—	pulled off
58	17:45	4	10	Wally Dallenbach	1	—	—	—	—	pulled off
59	17:50	4	61	Lee Brayton	1	—	—	—	—	waved off
60	17:53	4	97	Jigger Sirois	0	—	—	—	—	
61	18:00	4	10	Wally Dallenbach	2	—	—	—	—	pulled off

== Starting grid ==
Row	Inside		Middle		Outside	
1	6	(United States) Bobby Unser W	12	(United States) Peter Revson	66	(United States) Mark Donohue
2	7	(United States) Gary Bettenhausen	9	(United States) Mario Andretti W	1	(United States) Joe Leonard
3	34	(United States) Sam Posey R	18	(United States) Johnny Rutherford	42	(United States) Swede Savage R
4	15	(United States) Steve Krisiloff	5	(United States) Lloyd Ruby	23	(United States) Mel Kenyon
5	56	(United States) Jim Hurtubise	89	(United States) John Martin R	48	(United States) Jerry Grant
6	98	(United States) Mike Mosley	2	(United States) A. J. Foyt W	3	(United States) Bill Vukovich II
7	4	(United States) Al Unser W	14	(United States) Roger McCluskey	84	(United States) George Snider
8	95	(United States) Carl Williams	44	(United States) Dick Simon	52	(United States) Sammy Sessions
9	60	(United States) Mike Hiss R	24	(United States) Gordon Johncock	33	(United States) Salt Walther R
10	17	(United States) Denny Zimmerman	31	(United States) John Mahler R	37	(United States) Lee Kunzman R
11	11	(United States) Jimmy Caruthers R	21	(United States) Cale Yarborough	40	(United States) Wally Dallenbach Sr.

R Indianapolis 500 rookie
W Indianapolis 500 winner

=== Alternates ===
- First alternate: Wally Dallenbach (#10, #73)

=== Failed to qualify ===
- Merle Bettenhausen R (#35)
- Tom Bigelow R (#70)
- Lee Brayton R (#61)
- Larry Dickson (#19)
- George Eaton R (#25) – Failed rookie test
- Bob Harkey (#20, #99)
- David Hobbs (#83) – Did not arrive
- Parnelli Jones W (#49) – Did not arrive
- Jerry Karl R (#4, #16, #58, #99)
- Arnie Knepper (#90)
- Al Loquasto R (#43)
- Jim Malloy (#16) – Fatal accident
- Jim McElreath (#73)
- Rick Muther (#38)
- Art Pollard (#40) – Withdrew, injured
- Bill Puterbaugh R (#91)
- Bill Simpson R (#28)
- Jigger Sirois R (#20, #50, #91, #97)
- Bud Tingelstad (#33)
- Bruce Walkup (#97)
- Bentley Warren (#36)

== Race summary ==
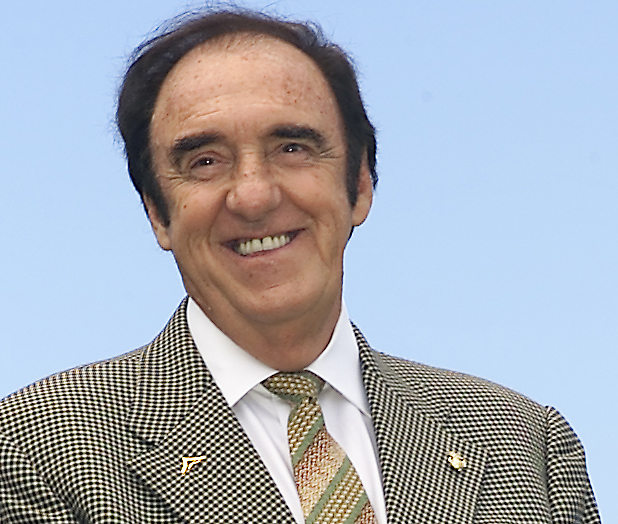
Jim Nabors performed during the pre-race ceremonies for the first time in 1972.

=== Pre-race ceremonies — Jim Nabors ===
On race morning, track president Tony Hulman was reportedly chatting with William F. Harrah, owner of Harrah's casino. Jim Nabors was accompanying Harrah as a guest at the race. Hulman recognized Nabors, and asked him if he wanted to 'sing the song' during the pre-race ceremonies. Believing that Hulman was talking about "The Star-Spangled Banner", Nabors agreed, and walked over to arrange with the Purdue Band. Nabors asked the band leader what key they were going to play, and it was not until that moment that he was informed he was going to be singing "Back Home Again in Indiana". A surprised Nabors quickly jotted the lyrics down on a sheet of paper, climbed up on a ladder, and performed the song unrehearsed. Although some contemporary accounts vary, it was nevertheless the beginning of a 36-year tradition that would see Nabors perform the song at Indianapolis nearly every year through 2014.

=== Start ===
Tony Hulman gave the command to start engines, and the field began to pull away for two pace laps. After the pace car crash a year earlier, the veteran driver Jim Rathmann was assigned the pace car driving duties. The passengers in the Hurst/Olds pace car included Tony Hulman, astronaut Pete Conrad, Chris Schenkel of ABC Sports, Bob Draper (Hurst), and Dolly Cole (wife of GM executive Ed Cole), believed to be the first woman ever to ride in the pace car.

As the field pushed off from the starting grid, A. J. Foyt's car stalled and failed to pull away. His crew hurriedly wheeled the car to the south end of the pit, and tried to figure out what was wrong with the machine. With the rest of the field gone, Foyt was possibly out of the race before the green flag. As the field was coming out of turn four, the starter held up one finger, indicating that the pace car should take the field on a second pace lap. However, at that moment the crew got Foyt's car running, and quickly pushed him away. The starter waved the pace car off the track and abruptly dropped the green flag, catching many drivers in the wrong gear to go racing and making for a ragged start. With Foyt slowly coming up to speed on the apron, the field blasted by him into turn one. Just as the race went green, rookie Salt Walther dropped out from a parts failure.

=== First half ===
Bobby Unser grabbed the lead in the first turn, and led the first 30 laps. Unser set a blistering pace with Mark Donohue and Jerry Grant running close behind. On lap 31, Bobby Unser slowed and headed to the pits with a broken ignition rotor. Unser was out of the race, and Gary Bettenhausen took the lead.

A. J. Foyt was forced to play catch-up from the onset, but was running fast laps in the 180 mph range. His day was short, however, as he blew the turbocharger. After several lengthy pit stops, Foyt dropped out of the race. Among the early outs were Peter Revson (started 2nd) and Johnny Rutherford (started 8th). During a pit stop around lap 42, Jerry Grant and Mark Donohue battled side-by-side as they exited their stalls, and Donohue nearly crashed into the scoring pylon. Meanwhile, a fire broke out in the pit area of Wally Dallenbach, but he was able to continue.

Mike Mosley took the lead on lap 54. Two laps later, he lost a wheel and crashed into the outside wall in turn four. The impact ruptured the fuel tank, and the car caught fire as it slid down the mainstretch. Mosley unbuckled before the car came to a rest and jumped from the car trying to put out the flames. Mosley suffered burns but was not seriously injured. It was the second year in a row Mosley wrecked out in the fourth turn.

On lap 81, for the second time, Wally Dallenbach had a fire in the pits.

At the halfway point, 13 cars were out of the race. Gary Bettenhausen continued to dominate the race, and led at the halfway point. After completing 94 laps, Jim Hurtubise ran out of fuel in turn two. When the safety truck went to tow him back to the pits, they proceeded to tow him through the infield and the garage area gate rather than directly around the track back to his pit stall. He refueled and rejoined the race, but was subsequently disqualified for leaving the race track. Some feel it was a "payback" gesture by USAC for Hurtubise's antics on bump day regarding his 'beer engine.'

=== Second half ===
Gary Bettenhausen continued to lead, pushing record speeds. Attrition began to take its toll on the field. By the 400-mile mark, eighteen cars were out of the race.

Lee Kunzman lost a wheel in turn two, bringing out a yellow light on the leader's lap 147.

Wally Dallenbach had his third fire in the pits on lap 151. The final round of scheduled pit stops occurred for the leaders around laps 160–165. Bettenhausen pitted first on lap 162, briefly giving the lead over to Jerry Grant. When Grant pitted four laps later, his long pit stop relinquished the lead back to Bettenhausen. Grant himself later theorized that, because he was running a high line to improve his Eagle-Offy's handling, he might have picked up debris that caused a puncture of his right-front tire.

The yellow light came on with about 27 laps to go for debris on the backstretch. When the green light came back on, Gary Bettenhausen's car seemed to hesitate. On lap 175, Bettenhausen suddenly started slowing at the north end of the track. After leading 138 of the first 175 laps, his car quit with ignition trouble. Bettenhausen later reported that the car had also suffered a pinhole puncture in the radiator earlier in the race. Slowly losing water, the engine temperature stayed in a mostly safe range while at racing speed, but when slowing down under the yellow caution period, it would overheat. He limped around very slowly for a handful of laps, then parked the car in the pits for a 14th-place finish.

Jerry Grant blasted by to take the lead, and Bettenhausen's Penske teammate Mark Donohue was now up to second position.

=== Finish ===
With 13 laps to go, Jerry Grant led Mark Donohue and Al Unser Sr. Grant was forced to make a pit stop on lap 188 to change a bad tire. Grant entered the pit area, but he overshot his own pit stall and instead pulled into the pit box of his teammate Bobby Unser (Unser was already out of the race). Grant's crew carried their equipment to Unser's pit box and serviced Grant's right front tire. In the confusion, Unser's crew refueled Grant's car with fuel from Unser's pitside tank. By the time Grant went back out on the race track, he had lost the lead.

With Grant's unscheduled pit stop, Mark Donohue took the lead on lap 188. Grant dropped to second place on the track. Donohue had about a one-lap lead over Grant, and third place Al Unser was two laps down. Mike Hiss spun in the south shortchute between turns 1 and 2 on lap 194, but did not hit the wall. Hiss continued, and the yellow light was on for less than one minute. The green flag came back out with five laps to go.

Donohue led the final 13 laps, and scored his first Indy 500 victory, and the first Indy victory for car owner Roger Penske. Per the rules of the time, the remainder of the field was permitted to continue racing for about five minutes after Donohue took the checkered flag. During that time, Sam Posey and Mario Andretti made pit stops, with Posey taking on fuel and returning to the track to finish 5th. Andretti was out of fuel, and dropped from 5th to 8th in the final standings.

In the immediate aftermath of the finish, USAC official Frank Delroy announced there would be no penalty for Grant pitting in the wrong stall. The initial ruling was that no fuel actually flowed into the tank. However, the decision would be further investigated during the evening, and a final ruling would be made when official results posted at 8:00 a.m. the next morning.

== Post race ==
=== Jerry Grant penalty ===
The morning after the race, USAC officials penalized Jerry Grant for taking fuel from Bobby Unser's pit tank. They disqualified him from that point on, and erased the final 12 laps from his tally. He was officially scored as out of the race with 188 laps completed. The penalty elevated Al Unser Sr. to second place, and dropped Grant to 12th finishing position. According to the rules, each car was allotted a strict limit of only 250 gallons of methanol in their pit-side tank (not including the fuel in the car at the start of the race) to complete the full 500 miles.

The details of the pit snafu were never fully explained, and remains a topic of discussion among historians and fans. The team maintained that fueling the car was an unintentional mistake, however, others felt otherwise. It has been reported by some witnesses that Grant was directed into Unser's pit stall by the crew, while others believe Grant simply overshot his own stall. Several possible theories emerged, with one prevailing opinion suggesting that Grant's car was out of fuel, and his pit-side tank was also empty, due to him running high turbocharger boost during the race. Grant supposedly needed a splash of fuel to make it to the finish, and since Bobby Unser dropped out early, his pit-side tank was still mostly full. It was thought that Grant deliberately stopped in Unser's pit, aware of the predicament, and knowing Unser's tank would fill his car sufficiently and quicker. Another claim was made to Grant's defense that while the fuel hose was admittedly hooked up, no fuel actually flowed into the car. This claim was quickly dismissed, in-part because dead-man valves were not standard until 1982. Grant maintained later in life the infraction was unintentional, maintained his innocence, and felt the penalty was unjust.

=== Post-race notes ===
Mark Donohue won the race leading only the final 13 laps, the third-lowest total in Indy history to that point (Joe Dawson led two laps in 1912, and Graham Hill led ten laps in 1966). The race was slowed five times for cautions for only 20 minutes. Donohue's average speed of 162.962 mph set a new race record that would last until 1984.

Vanguard Racing (of which Leonard W. Miller was involved), became the first African American-owned team to enter a car in the Indy 500. John Mahler (who was white) served as the driver. He dropped out after 99 laps with a broken piston.

== Box score ==
Finish	Start	No	Name	Chassis	Engine	Tire	Qual	Laps	Time/Retired
1	3	66	(United States) Mark Donohue	McLaren M16	Offenhauser	G	191.408	200	162.962 mph
2	19	4	(United States) Al Unser W	Parnelli	Offenhauser	F	183.617	200	+3:10.95
3	6	1	(United States) Joe Leonard	Parnelli	Offenhauser	F	185.223	200	+4:12.07
4	24	52	(United States) Sammy Sessions	Lola	Foyt V-8	F	180.415	200	+5:17.34
5	7	34	(United States) Sam Posey R	Eagle	Offenhauser	G	184.379	198	Flagged (-2 laps)
6	11	5	(United States) Lloyd Ruby	Atlanta	Foyt V-8	F	181.415	196	Flagged (-4 laps)
7	25	60	(United States) Mike Hiss R	Eagle	Offenhauser	G	179.015	196	Flagged (-4 laps)
8	5	9	(United States) Mario Andretti W	Parnelli	Offenhauser	F	187.617	194	Out of Fuel
9	31	11	(United States) Jimmy Caruthers R	Scorpion	Foyt V-8	F	178.909	194	Flagged (-6 laps)
10	32	21	(United States) Cale Yarborough	Atlanta	Foyt V-8	F	178.864	193	Flagged (-7 laps)
11	21	84	(United States) George Snider	Coyote	Foyt V-8	G	181.855	190	Flagged (-10 laps)
12	15	48	(United States) Jerry Grant	Eagle	Offenhauser	G	189.294	188	Penalized
13	23	44	(United States) Dick Simon	Lola	Foyt V-8	G	180.424	186	Out of Fuel
14	4	7	(United States) Gary Bettenhausen	McLaren M16	Offenhauser	G	188.877	182	Ignition
15	33	40	(United States) Wally Dallenbach Sr.	Lola	Foyt V-8	F	181.626	182	Flagged (-18 laps)
16	14	89	(United States) John Martin R	Brabham	Offenhauser	F	179.614	161	Fuel Leak
17	30	37	(United States) Lee Kunzman R	Gerhardt	Offenhauser	G	179.265	131	Lost Tire
18	12	23	(United States) Mel Kenyon	Coyote	Foyt V-8	G	181.388	126	Fuel Injection
19	28	17	(United States) Denny Zimmerman	McLaren M16	Offenhauser	F	180.027	116	Ignition Rotor
20	26	24	(United States) Gordon Johncock	McLaren M16	Offenhauser	G	188.511	113	Exhaust Valve
21	10	15	(United States) Steve Krisiloff	Kingfish	Offenhauser	F	181.433	102	Ignition Rotor
22	29	31	(United States) John Mahler R	McLaren M16	Offenhauser	G	179.497	99	Piston
23	13	56	(United States) Jim Hurtubise	Coyote	Foyt V-8	F	181.050	94	Penalized
24	20	14	(United States) Roger McCluskey	Antares	Offenhauser	G	182.686	92	Valve
25	17	2	(United States) A. J. Foyt W	Coyote	Foyt V-8	G	188.996	60	Turbocharger
26	16	98	(United States) Mike Mosley	Eagle	Offenhauser	F	189.145	56	Crash T4
27	8	18	(United States) Johnny Rutherford	Brabham	Offenhauser	G	183.234	55	Rod
28	18	3	(United States) Bill Vukovich II	Eagle	Offenhauser	G	184.814	54	Rear End
29	22	95	(United States) Carl Williams	Eagle	Offenhauser	F	180.469	52	Oil Cooler
30	1	6	(United States) Bobby Unser W	Eagle	Offenhauser	G	195.940	31	Ignition Rotor
31	2	12	(United States) Peter Revson	McLaren M16	Offenhauser	G	192.885	23	Gearbox
32	9	42	(United States) Swede Savage R	Eagle	Offenhauser	G	181.726	5	Rod
33	27	33	(United States) Salt Walther R	Colt	Foyt V-8	F	180.542	0	Magneto

W Former Indianapolis 500 winner

R Indianapolis 500 Rookie

- Jerry Grant completed 200 laps and unofficially placed 2nd. After the race, he was penalized for pitting in Bobby Unser's pit on lap 188, and all subsequent laps were disallowed.
- Jim Hurtubise completed 171 and unofficially placed 16th. After the race, he was penalized for being towed through the infield on lap 94, and all subsequent laps were disallowed. Car owner Dick Sommers filed a protest, but it was denied.

=== Race statistics ===
Lap Leaders
Laps	Leader
1–30	Bobby Unser
31–53	Gary Bettenhausen
54–56	Mike Mosley
57–161	Gary Bettenhausen
162–165	Jerry Grant
166–175	Gary Bettenhausen
176–187	Jerry Grant
188–200	Mark Donohue

Total laps led
Driver	Laps
Gary Bettenhausen	138
Bobby Unser	30
Jerry Grant	16
Mark Donohue	13
Mike Mosley	3

PACER Yellow Light Periods
5 for 14 laps (20 minutes, 36 seconds)
Laps*	Reason
30–31	Debris in turn 1 (<1 minute)
56–61	Mike Mosley crash in turn 4 (10 minutes)
145–150	Lee Kunzman lost wheel in turn 2 (6 minutes)
172–175	Debris on backstretch (3 minutes)
193–195	Mike Hiss spun in southchute (1 minute)
* – Approximate lap counts

Tire participation chart
Supplier	No. of starters
Goodyear	18*
Firestone	15
* - Denotes race winner

== Pace car ==
The Pace Car was a 1972 Hurst/Olds convertible with a Hurst Performance modified 455 cubic inch W-30 engine built to pre-smog high compression 1970 specs. It was equipped with a TH-400 transmission and a "His and Hers" Hurst Dual Gate shifter, plus a 3.42 rear axle ratio. An all aluminum W-27 differential cover was used for weight and cooling purposes. Mark Donohue was given the car for winning the race that day. About 629 of these cars were built for public consumption of which 130 were convertibles, 220 with sunroofs and the remaining 279 being hardtops. Almost all of these Pace Car replicas had the less powerful L-75 455 engine and 3.23 axle. A W-30 (L-77) could be ordered but only with 1972 specs netting 300HP with only 8.5 compression. All were painted Cameo white and carried unique 3M Firefrost Gold reflective fade out(pin dotted) laser stripes. In addition to this package, special Indy Pace Car decals with festival stickers could be ordered with large H/O stickers adorning the quarter panels.

== Broadcasting ==
=== Radio ===
The race was carried live on the IMS Radio Network. It was carried on over 1,200 affiliates, including shortwave transmission to Japan, Vietnam, the Arctic and Antarctic. The broadcast reached an estimated 100 million listeners worldwide. Sid Collins served as chief announcer and Len Sutton served as "driver expert" for the seventh and final time. At the conclusion of the race, Lou Palmer reported from victory lane.

Sid Collins celebrated his milestone 25th year as chief announcer. During the pre-race coverage, Governor Edgar Whitcomb presented Collins with the Distinguished Hoosier Award, a recognition from American Forces Network, and a personalized letter of recognition from President Richard Nixon. Indianapolis mayor Dick Lugar likewise presented Collins with a silver microphone and declared May 27, 1972, as "Sid Collins Day".

The entire on-air crew remained mostly consistent from 1966 to 1971. Bob Forbes was assigned as "wireless" microphone, covering the garages and roving reports. For 1972, the pre-race coverage expanded from 30 minutes to 45 minutes and came on-air at 10:15 a.m. local time. Howdy Bell's vantage point in turn two (an observation spot against the outside of the retaining wall), would be the final time reporting from that location. Starting in 1973, the vantage point would move to the new VIP Suites.

Jim Shelton (born May 27, 1919), who was reporting his 23rd race on the crew, was also celebrating his 53rd birthday.

Indianapolis Motor Speedway Radio Network
Booth Announcers	Turn Reporters	Pit/garage reporters
Chief Announcer: Sid Collins; Driver expert: Len Sutton; Statistician: John DeCamp; Historian: Donald Davidson	Turn 1: Mike Ahern; Turn 2: Howdy Bell; Backstretch: Doug Zink; Turn 3: Ron Carrell; Turn 4: Jim Shelton	Chuck Marlowe (north); Luke Walton (center); Lou Palmer (south); Bob Forbes (wireless/garages)

=== Television ===
The race was carried in the United States on ABC Sports on a same-day tape delay basis. The race was held in the afternoon, and the broadcast aired in prime time later in the day. The two and a half hour broadcast was hosted by Chris Schenkel. Jim McKay and Jackie Stewart served as booth announcers. Chris Economaki was one of the pit reporters. Keith Jackson and Stu Nahan hosted a separate 30-minute trackside report before the ABC telecast that was available to some viewers on the west coast.

ABC Television
Booth Announcers	Pit/garage reporters
Host: Chris Schenkel; Announcer: Jim McKay; Color: Jackie Stewart	Chris Economaki

== Gallery ==
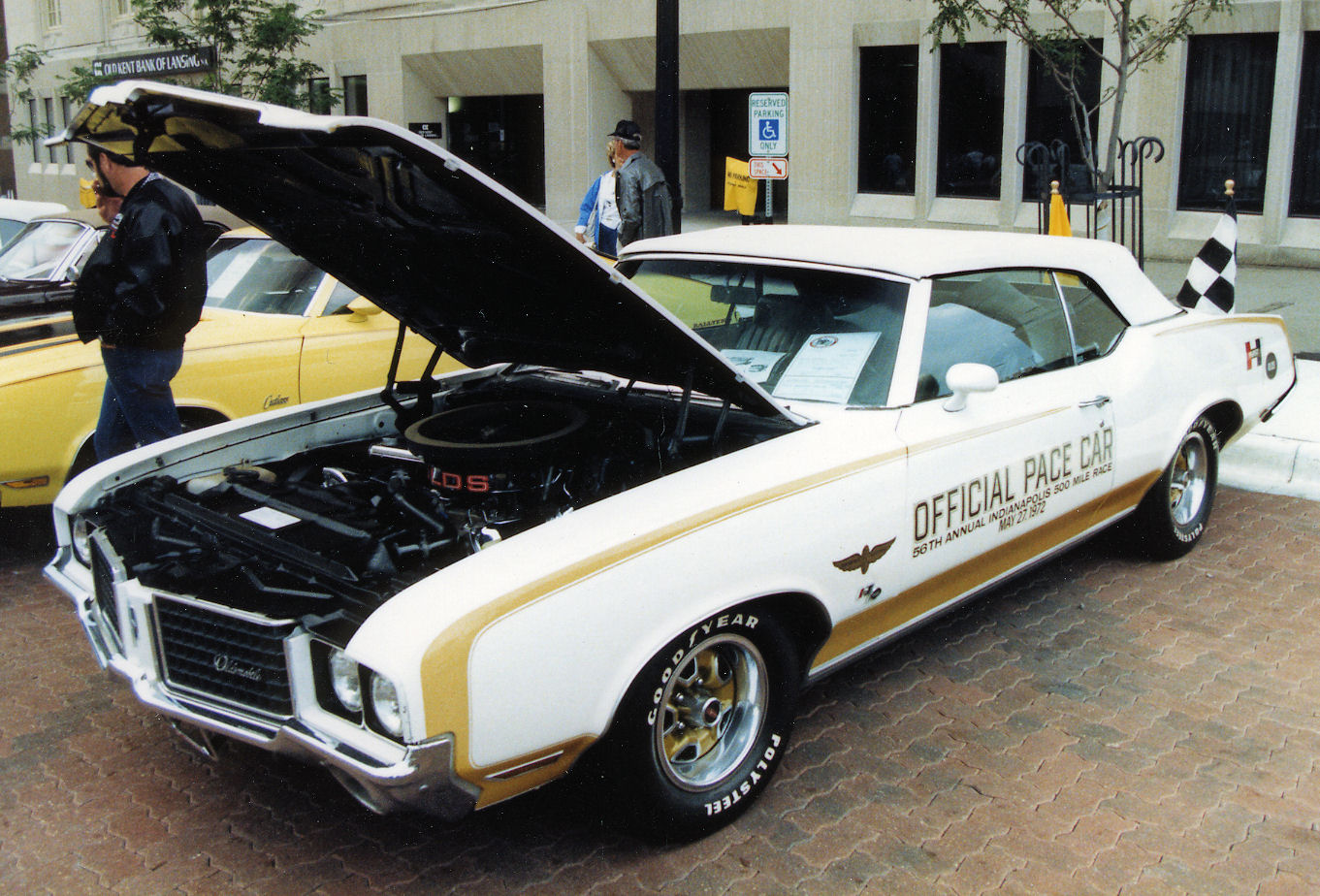
1972 Hurst/Olds Pace Car.

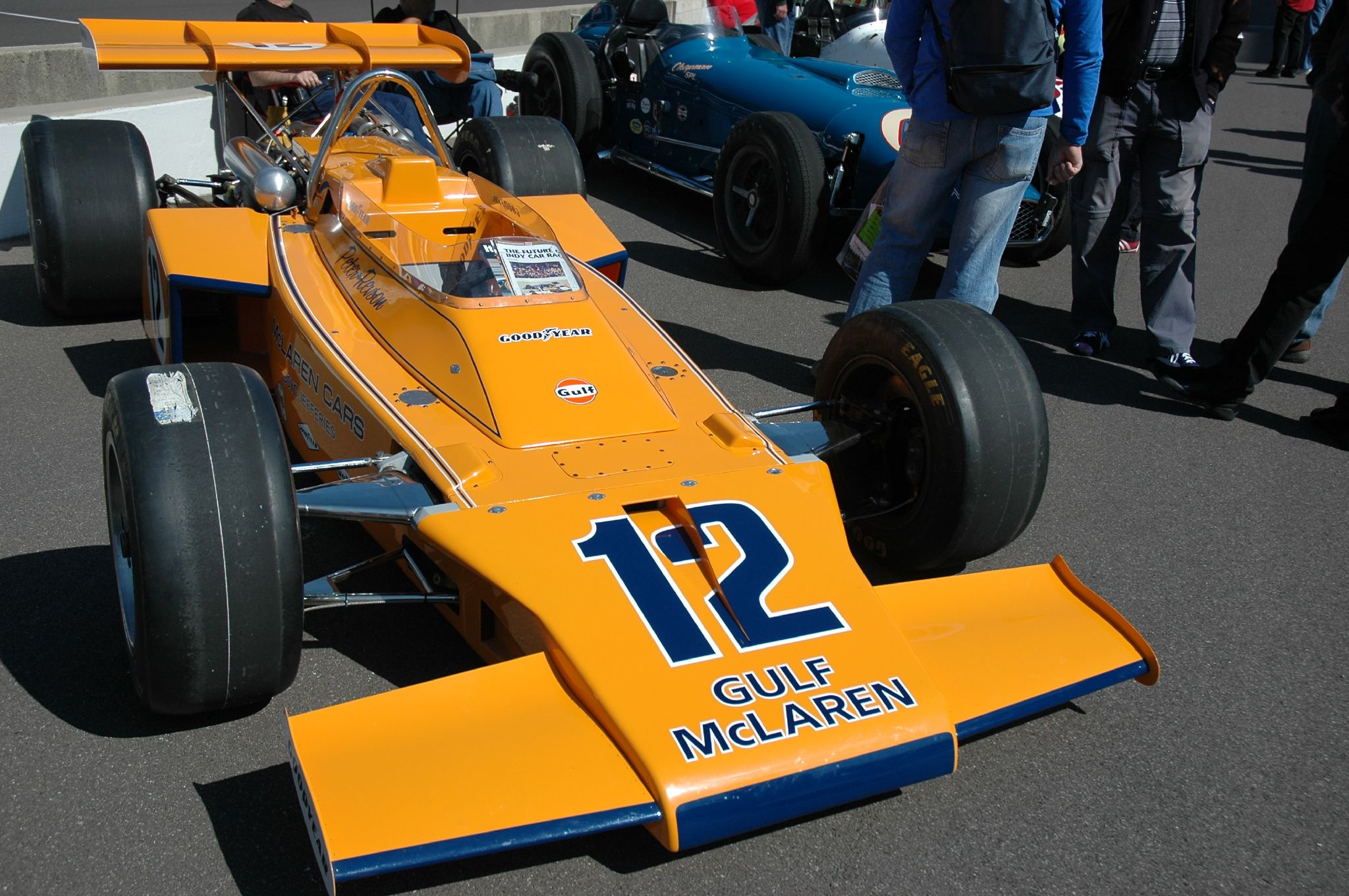
The McLaren M16C was driven by Peter Revson

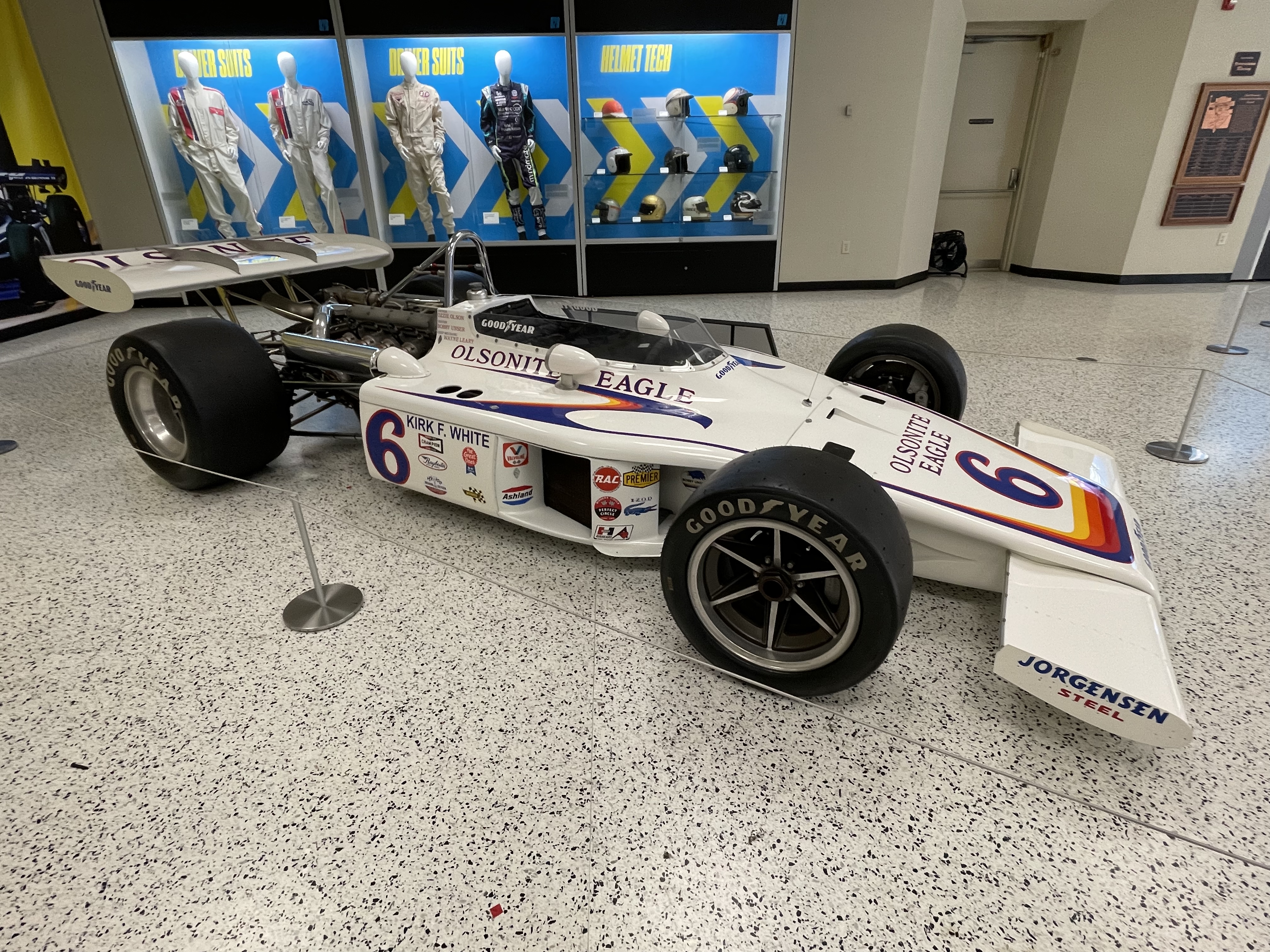
Bobby Unser's Olsonite Eagle

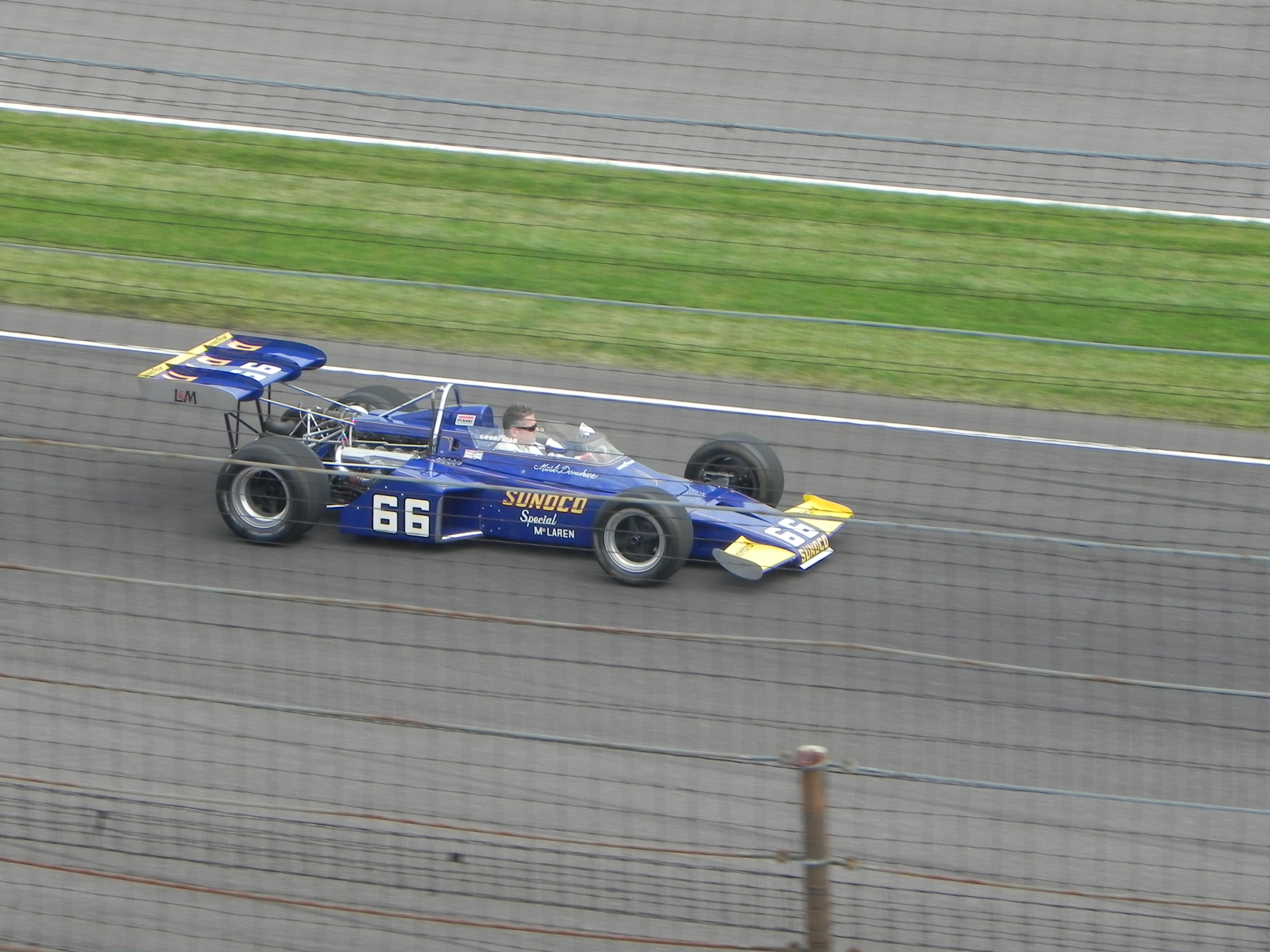
1972 winning car taking ceremonial laps in 2011

== Notes ==
=== Works cited ===
- 1972 Indianapolis 500 Press Information - Daily Trackside Summary
- Indianapolis 500 History: Race & All-Time Stats - Official Site
- 1972 Indianapolis 500 Radio Broadcast, Indianapolis Motor Speedway Radio Network

=== See also ===
- 1972 USAC Championship Car season

1971 Indianapolis 500; Al Unser	1972 Indianapolis 500; Mark Donohue	1973 Indianapolis 500; Gordon Johncock
Preceded by 157.735 mph (1971 Indianapolis 500)	Record for the fastest average speed 162.962 mph	Succeeded by 163.612 mph (1984 Indianapolis 500)
