= Johnny Anderson (racing driver) =

American racing driver (born 1942)

- Born: July 24, 1942 (age 84); Palmdale, California, U.S.

NASCAR Cup Series career
- 9 races run over 4 years
- Best finish: 67th (1972)
- First race: 1971 Winston Golden State 400 (Riverside)
- Last race: 1974 Tuborg 400 (Riverside)
Wins	Top tens	Poles
0	0	0

ARCA Menards Series West career
- 44 races run over 4 years
- Best finish: 15th (1972, 1974)
- First race: 1971 Winston Golden State 400 (Riverside)
- Last race: 1974 Ascot 100 (Gardena)
- First win: 1971 Orange Show 150 (Orange Show)
Wins	Top tens	Poles
1	13	0

Champ Car career
- 3 races run over 2 years
- Best finish: 55th (1969, 1970)
- First race: 1969 Golden State 100 (Sacramento)
- Last race: 1970 Golden State 100 (Sacramento)
Wins	Podiums	Poles
0	0	0
- Statistics up to date as of September 13, 2026.

Johnny Anderson (born July 24, 1942) is an American former professional racing driver. He competed in the USAC Champ Car Series from 1969 to 1970 and the NASCAR Winston Cup Series and NASCAR Winston West Series from 1971 and 1974. He also competed in multiple forms of dirt racing.

== Racing career ==
Anderson began racing when his father purchased a quarter midget at an auto auction before moving to a half midget at around 10 to 12 years old and a micro midget at age 15, scoring rookie of the year in everything he ran. He began racing hardtop cars at West Capital Raceway and Hughes Stadium in 1961 at the age of 16. He would move to supermodifieds after hardtops. Anderson first began racing sprint cars in 1966, often traveling to Ascot Park, a track he would take the qualifying record for midget racing from A. J. Foyt at. Anderson made his USAC Champ Car debut at the California State Fairgrounds Race Track in 1969, finishing eighth; he failed to qualify at Phoenix International Raceway. He would return to the series at Phoenix in 1970, finishing twentieth after a crash with Gary Bettenhausen, who blamed the accident on Anderson on national TV, ultimately costing him a shot at running the Indianapolis 500. He returned to the California State Fairgrounds later in the season, finishing 12th despite retiring with fuel pump issues.

Anderson began competing in NASCAR in 1971, simultaneously making his NASCAR Winston Cup Series and NASCAR Winston West Series debut in the Winston Golden State 400 at Riverside International Raceway, finishing 29th due to engine issues. He would make nine more Winston West starts, scoring a win at Orange Show Speedway in his third career start as well as four other top-tens, including a runner-up finish at San Gabriel Valley Speedway. Anderson ran fourteen races in 1972 but was only able to score two top-tens. This schedule included three combination races with the Winston Cup Series, where he finished 19th and 27th in the races at Riverside and 17th at Ontario Motor Speedway; he also competed at Texas World Speedway and finished 42nd due to engine issues. Anderson only made one Winston West start in 1973, finishing 14th at Orange Show. He ran the Winston Cup races at Riverside, finishing 28th and 21st. Anderson's final year in NASCAR was 1974, where he ran a career-high 19 Winston West races, scoring six top-tens. In the combination races at Riverside, he finished 20th and 28th.

Anderson introduced American sprint car racing to Australia, bringing the first American sprint car to the country in 1972. Promoters in New Zealand saw Anderson running the car and he would spend weeks racing sprint cars, midgets, and stock cars in the country. Anderson also introduced power steering to west coast short track racing around 1976, the same year he won the Northern Auto Racing Club (NARC) championship. Anderson made at least ten starts in the World of Outlaws Sprint Car Series in 1978, scoring a win at Calistoga Speedway. He made at least 33 starts in 1979, scoring twenty top-tens and three wins. He finished tenth in the standings. In 12 races in 1980, Anderson scored seven top-tens and his final World of Outlaws win at Silver Dollar Speedway. On November 3, 1980, Anderson was involved in a bad sprint car wreck at Corona Speedway that put him in a coma for around two and a half weeks. Newspapers pronounced him dead. Anderson has stated he has no memory of the accident or his last World of Outlaws win. Anderson returned to Silver Dollar Speedway in 1983 for his final World of Outlaws attempt but failed to qualify. He began running a midget car again in 1984, finishing 11th in BCRA points. Anderson would reunite with former classmate Brenda at their 25th high school reunion as Anderson was making his comeback in racing. They would later become a couple and marry; Brenda did not want Johnny to get injured again and he would ultimately retire. He made a brief NARC return in 1993, finishing 18th twice.
