= Jim Malloy =

American racing driver

- Born: May 23, 1932; Columbus, Nebraska, U.S.
- Died: May 18, 1972 (aged 39); Indianapolis, Indiana, U.S.

James H. Malloy Jr. (May 23, 1932 – May 18, 1972) was an American racecar driver.

Born in Columbus, Nebraska, Malloy's family moved to Englewood, Colorado, where he attended grade school and high school. Malloy lettered in football and baseball in high school. He attended Colorado State University for two years.

== Early Racing Years ==
In 1955, Malloy started driving Semi-Modifieds at Lakeside Speedway in Denver, Colorado. He continued racing at Lakeside through 1962. This is where he branched out and ran with the fledgling Canadian American Modified Racing Association (CAMRA), an organization that raced mainly in the Northwest United States and in British Columbia. The CAMRA series became a series where a driver could develop their skills and move up to Indy Car racing and running the Indianapolis 500. Billy Foster, Art Pollard, Dick Simon and later Indy 500 winner Tom Sneva, his brother Jerry Sneva, Eldon Rasmussen and Cliff Hucul raced in the Indy 500 after graduating from the CAMRA series. Malloy was no exception. He drove a modified built and prepared by his brother Jerry Malloy and in 1964 and 1965, he won the CAMRA championship.

== Indy car racing ==
In 1967, Malloy started driving USAC sprint cars. This is when Malloy got a huge break in his racing career. He was hired by the Jim Robbins Race Team to drive USAC Indy Cars. He ran eight races for the Robbins team that year with his best finish being a 6th at Langhorne, Pennsylvania. The Robbins team brought Malloy to Indianapolis in 1968 where he was the fastest rookie qualifier. He started 14th and finished 22nd, dropping out after 64 laps with mechanical failure. In 1969, Malloy started 13th and despite an early 22 minute pit stop he managed an 11th-place finish. In 1970, he qualified ninth, his best starting position to date. His car broke a rear constant velocity joint and hit the 4th turn wall at the end of the pace lap, putting himself out of the race even before the start. In 1971, he was originally entered in a car for the M.V.S. Racing Team. But when LeeRoy Yarbrough crashed hard with one of Dan Gurney's Eagles, his injuries were severe enough that he could not compete in the Indy 500 in 1971. Dan Gurney asked Malloy to pilot the Eagle in place of Yarbrough. He drove a solid race finishing fourth, his personal best at Indianapolis.

Malloy drove in the USAC Championship Car series, racing in the 1967–1972 seasons, with 61 career starts, including the 1968–1971 Indianapolis 500 races. In his Champ Car career, he finished in the top ten 23 times, with his best finish in second position in 1969 at the Milwaukee Mile, driving for Vel's Parnelli Jones Racing in a substitute role for the injured Al Unser.

=== Death ===
In 1972, Malloy signed on to drive for the Gerhardt racing team and one of the very fast 1972 Eagles. During the month of May, Malloy and the new Eagle was among the fastest cars. During the practice session on May 14, he was attempting to break the 200 mph (320 km/h) speed barrier (which other Indy drivers were trying to do at the time) when his car mysteriously cut sharply to the right and crashed head-on into the outside retaining wall confining Turn 3 at about 186 mph (299 km/h). Malloy died in the hospital, four days after being pulled from his destroyed car. He never regained consciousness. His injuries included head injuries, second degree burns to his face, feet, and hands, and fractures to his right arm and both of his legs and hips. Malloy died only five days before what would have been his 40th birthday.

== Other Racing ==
Malloy attempted to race in the 1966 Daytona 500 but only managed a 21st-place finish in his qualifying race and failed to make the field.

Malloy also drove a 1958 Edsel Pacer at Colorado National Speedway in 1968.

In 1979, Malloy was inducted into the Colorado Motorsports Hall of Fame.

== Personal life ==
Malloy had a wife named Mary. Together, they had two sons, Jim and Pat, and a daughter, Cheryl.

== Indianapolis 500 results ==
Year	Car No.	Car	Entrant	Chassis	Engine	Start	Finish	Laps	Running/Reason Out
1968	27	Jim Robbins Seat Belt Spl.	Jim Robbins Co.	Vollstedt	Ford	14th	22nd	64	Split Gear Case
1969	10	Jim Robbins Seat Belt Spl.	Jim Robbins Co.	Vollstedt	Ford	13th	11th	165	Running
1970	31	Stearns Transi-Tread Spl.	Federal Automotive Associates	Gerhardt	Offy	9th	33rd	0	Crash
1971	29	M.V.S. Spl.	M.V.S., Inc.	Morris	Ford	Did not qualify			
1971	42	Olsonite Eagle	Dan Gurney	Eagle	Offy	10th	4th	200	Running
1972	16	Thermo-King Spl.	Don Gerhardt	Eagle	Offy	Practice Crash (Fatal)			

== See also ==
- List of Indianapolis fatalities
- Video on Dailymotion
- Video on YouTube
