= Art Pollard =

American racing driver (1927–1973)

- Born: Artle Lee Pollard, Jr. May 5, 1927 Dragon, Utah, U.S.
- Died: May 12, 1973 (aged 46) Indianapolis, Indiana, U.S.

Champ Car career
- 83 races run over 9 years
- Years active: 1965–1973
- Best finish: 8th – 1970
- First race: 1965 Tony Bettenhausen 200 (Milwaukee)
- Last race: 1973 Texas 200 (College Station)
- First win: 1969 Rex Mays Classic (Milwaukee)
- Last win: 1969 Delaware 200 (Dover)
| Wins | Podiums | Poles |
|---|---|---|
| 2 | 5 | 2 |

Artle Lee Pollard Jr. (May 5, 1927 – May 12, 1973), was an American racecar driver.

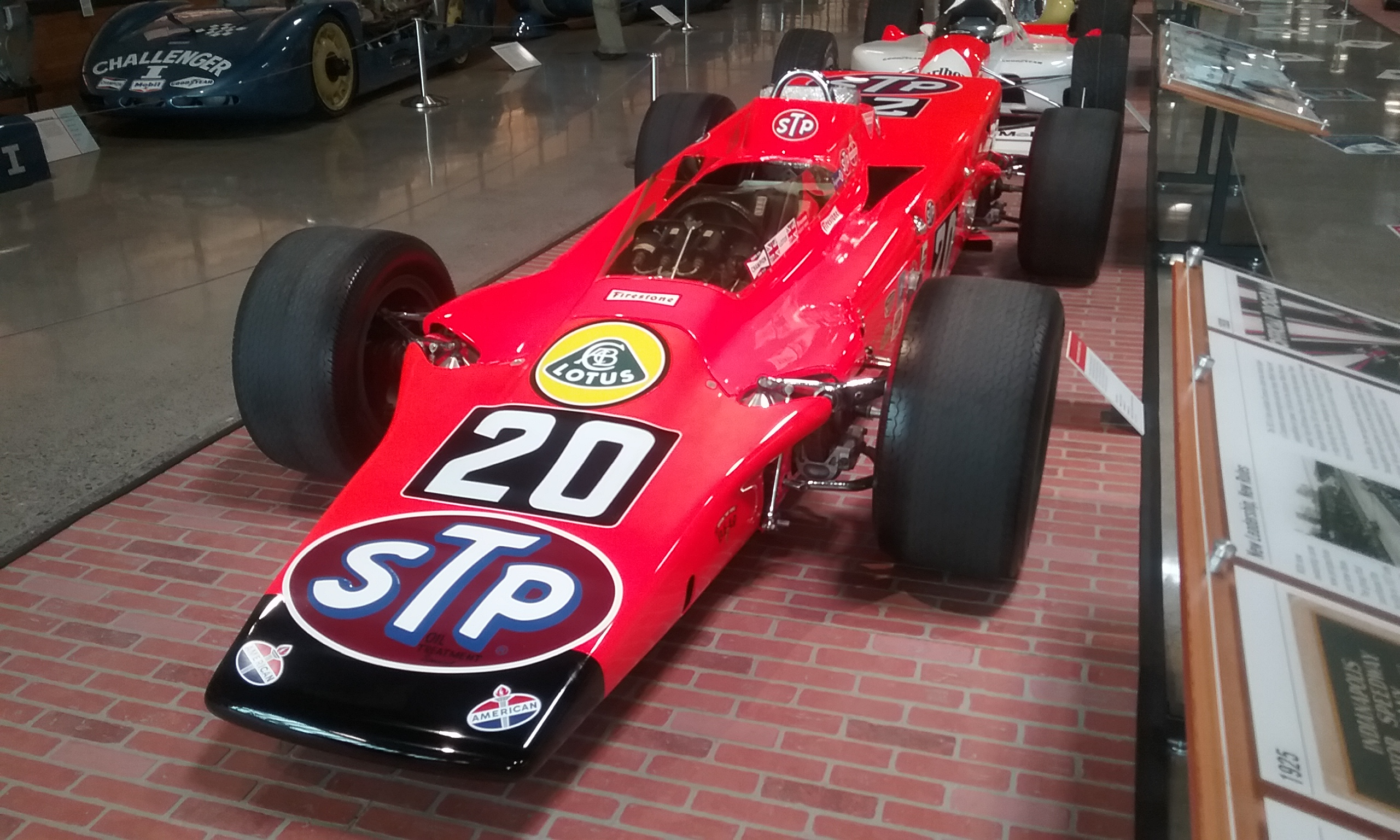
The Lotus 56 Pollard drove in the 1968 Indianapolis 500

Born in Dragon, Utah, and raised in the Portland, Oregon area, Pollard drove in the USAC Championship Car series, racing in the 1965–1973 seasons, with 84 career starts, including the 1967–1971 Indianapolis 500 races. He finished in the top-ten 30 times, with two victories, both in 1969, at Milwaukee and Dover.

Pollard died in Indianapolis, Indiana, as a result of injuries sustained in a crash during practice on the first day of time trials for the 1973 Indianapolis 500 while racing for the Fletcher Racing Team. The car slammed into the outside wall coming out of turn one, burst into flames, and spun as it headed to the grass on the inside of the short chute. The chassis dug into the grass and flipped upside-down, slid a short distance and then flipped back over as it reached the pavement again in turn two, finally coming to a stop in the middle of the track. Pollard's lap prior to the crash was timed at a speed above 192 miles per hour (309 km/h). He was found unconscious, and was rushed to Methodist Hospital. Pollard never regained consciousness, and his injuries were reported to include pulmonary damage due to flame inhalation, third degree burns on both hands, face and neck, a fractured right arm, a fractured leg, and a severe spinal cord injury. He was pronounced dead one hour after the accident. Pollard had turned 46 one week before he died.

Pollard, away from racing, worked as a car dealer and mechanic. He also served in the United States Navy.

== Motorsports career results ==
=== USAC Championship Car results ===
| Year | 1 | 2 | 3 | 4 | 5 | 6 | 7 | 8 | 9 | 10 | 11 | 12 | 13 | 14 | 15 | 16 | 17 | 18 | 19 | 20 | 21 | 22 | 23 | 24 | 25 | 26 | 27 | 28 | Pos | Points |
|---|---|---|---|---|---|---|---|---|---|---|---|---|---|---|---|---|---|---|---|---|---|---|---|---|---|---|---|---|---|---|
| 1965 | PHX | TRE | INDY | MIL | LAN | PPR | TRE | IRP | ATL | LAN | MIL | ISF | MIL; 22 | DSF | INF | TRE; 5 | SAC; DNQ | PHX; 19 | | | | | | | | | | | 29th | 200 |
| 1966 | PHX | TRE | INDY; DNQ | MIL; 4 | LAN; 22 | ATL; 22 | PIP | IRP; DNQ | LAN; 23 | SPR | MIL; 7 | DUQ | ISF | TRE | SAC; 9 | PHX; 22 | | | | | | | | | | | | | 23rd | 280 |
| 1967 | PHX; 7 | TRE; 8 | INDY; 8 | MIL; 20 | LAN; 14 | PIP | MOS; 9 | MOS; 21 | IRP | LAN; DNQ | MTR | MTR | SPR | MIL | DUQ | ISF | TRE | SAC | HAN; 5 | PHX; 14 | RIV; 30 | | | | | | | | 11th | 655 |
| 1968 | HAN; 16 | LVG; 8 | PHX; 5 | TRE; 13 | INDY; 13 | MIL; 16 | MOS; 14 | MOS | LAN; 18 | PIP | CDR; 5 | NAZ | IRP; 7 | IRP; 9 | LAN; 26 | LAN | MTR | MTR | SPR; DNQ | MIL; 14 | DUQ; 14 | ISF; 10 | TRE; 10 | SAC; 10 | MCH; 6 | HAN; DNQ | PHX; 20 | RIV; 16 | 23rd | 696 |
| 1969 | PHX; 19 | HAN; 15 | INDY; 31 | MIL; 1 | LAN; 2 | PIP | CDR; 18 | NAZ | TRE; DNQ | IRP; 25 | IRP; 16 | MIL; 6 | SPR | DOV; 1 | DUQ; DNQ | ISF; 18 | BRN; 18 | BRN | TRE; 14 | SAC; 14 | KEN; 18 | KEN; 12 | PHX; 19 | RIV; 16 | | | | | 12th | 1.110 |
| 1970 | PHX; 11 | SON | TRE; 21 | INDY; 30 | MIL; 18 | LAN; DNP | CDR; 19 | MCH; 17 | IRP | SPR; DNP | MIL; 11 | ONT; 2 | DUQ | ISF | SED | TRE; 6 | SAC | PHX; 24 | | | | | | | | | | | 8th | 1.110 |
| 1971 | RAF; DNP | RAF | PHX; 24 | TRE; 6 | INDY; 26 | MIL; 5 | POC; 16 | MCH; 16 | MIL; 16 | ONT; 2 | TRE; 20 | PHX; 9 | | | | | | | | | | | | | | | | | 11th | 1.170 |
| 1972 | PHX; 14 | TRE | INDY; DNQ | MIL | MCH | POC | MIL | ONT; 7 | TRE; 9 | PHX; 11 | | | | | | | | | | | | | | | | | | | 20th | 450 |
| 1973 | TWS; 19 | TRE; DNQ | TRE | INDY; DNQ | MIL | POC | MCH | MIL | ONT | ONT | ONT | MCH | MCH | TRE | TWS | PHX | | | | | | | | | | | | | - | 0 |

=== Indianapolis 500 results ===
| Year | Car | Start | Qual | Rank | Finish | Laps | Led | Retired |
|---|---|---|---|---|---|---|---|---|
| 1967 | 16 | 13 | 163.897 | 15 | 8 | 195 | 0 | Flagged |
| 1968 | 20 | 11 | 166.297 | 11 | 13 | 188 | 0 | Fuel Shaft |
| 1969 | 40 | 12 | 167.123 | 12 | 31 | 7 | 0 | Drive Line |
| 1970 | 10 | 6 | 168.595 | 7 | 30 | 28 | 0 | Piston |
| 1971 | 64 | 32 | 169.499 | 31 | 22 | 77 | 0 | Valve |
| 1972 | 40 | | Withdrew due to injury | | | | | |
| 1973 | 64 | | Practice crash, fatal | | | | | |
| Totals | | | | | | 495 | 0 | |

| Starts | 5 |
| Poles | 0 |
| Front Row | 0 |
| Wins | 0 |
| Top 5 | 0 |
| Top 10 | 1 |
| Retired | 4 |
