= 1970 Indianapolis 500 =

American motor race

54th Indianapolis 500
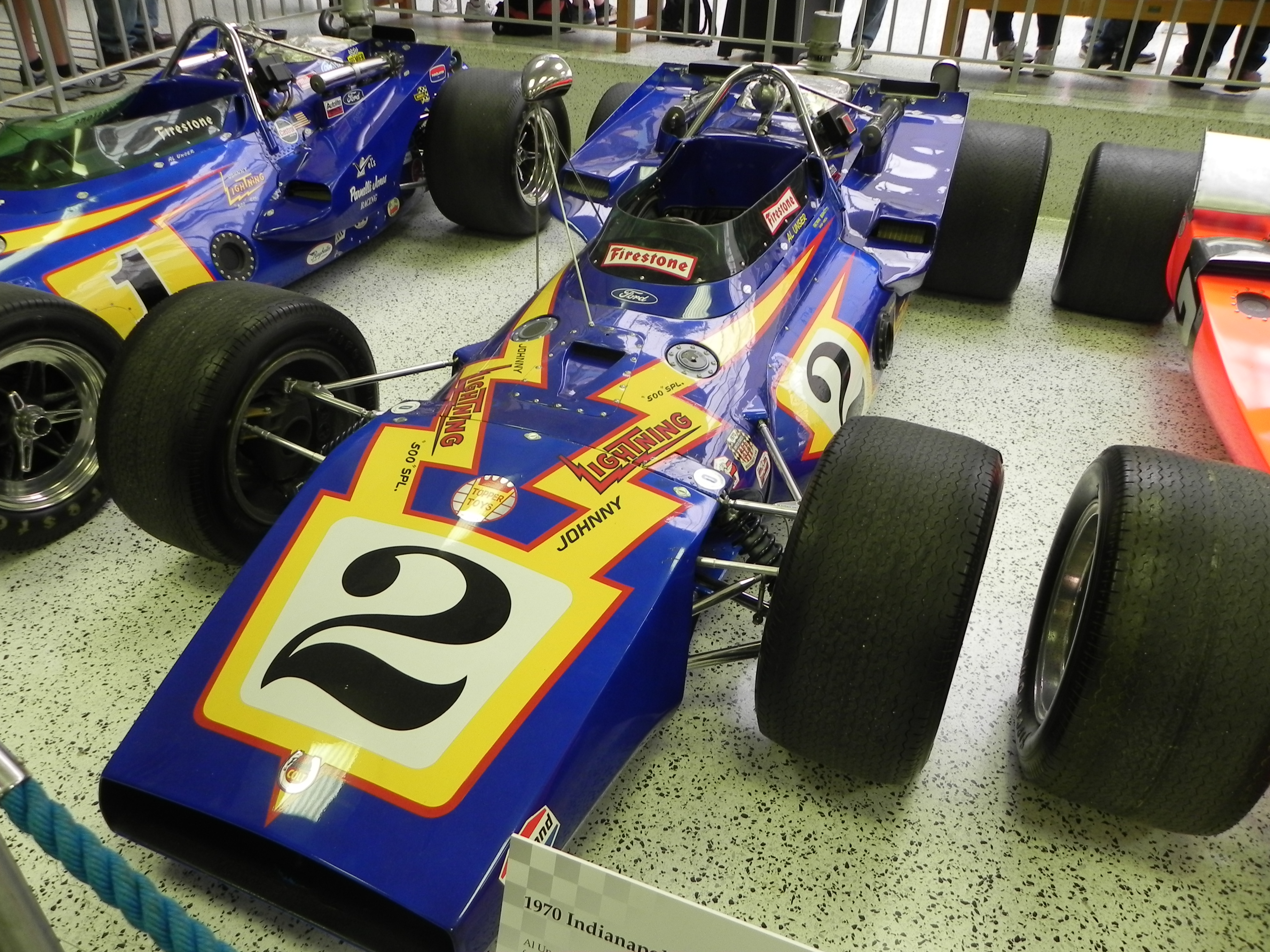

Indianapolis Motor Speedway

Indianapolis 500
- Sanctioning body: USAC
- Season: 1970 USAC Trail
- Date: May 30, 1970
- Winner: Al Unser, Sr.
- Winning team: Vel's Parnelli Jones Racing
- Winning Chief Mechanic: George Bignotti
- Time of race: 3:12:37.04
- Average speed: 155.749 mph (250.654 km/h)
- Pole position: Al Unser, Sr.
- Pole speed: 170.221 mph (273.944 km/h)
- Fastest qualifier: Al Unser, Sr.
- Rookie of the Year: Donnie Allison
- Most laps led: Al Unser, Sr. (190)

Pre-race ceremonies
- National anthem: Al Hirt
- "Back Home Again in Indiana": Saverio Saridis
- Starting command: Tony Hulman
- Pace car: Oldsmobile 442
- Pace car driver: Rodger Ward
- Starter: Pat Vidan
- Estimated attendance: 250,000

Television in the United States
- Network: ABC's Wide World of Sports
- Announcers: Jim McKay, Rodger Ward

Chronology
Previous	Next
1969	1971

The 54th 500 Mile International Sweepstakes was held at the Indianapolis Motor Speedway in Speedway, Indiana on Saturday, May 30, 1970. Al Unser Sr. dominated the race, winning the pole position and leading 190 laps (of 200) en route to victory. He joined his brother Bobby as the first duo of brothers to win the Indianapolis 500; it was the first of his four victories at Indianapolis. Car owner Parnelli Jones, who won the race as a driver in 1963, became the second individual (after Pete DePaolo) to win separately as both a driver and as an owner.

Unser turned 31 a day earlier and took home $271,697 out of a record $1,000,002 purse. For the first time in Indy history, the total prize fund topped a million dollars.

Rain on race morning delayed the start by about thirty minutes. On the pace lap, Jim Malloy smacked the outside wall in turn four, which delayed the start further.

All 33 cars in the field were turbocharged for the first time. This was the final 500 in which the winner celebrated in the old Victory Lane at the south end of the pits; it was relocated nearer the finish line for 1971.

== Race schedule ==
The race start time was scheduled for 12:00 noon local time, a slight departure from the traditional 11:00 am start time that was used during most of the 1960s. With the race scheduled for Saturday May 30, Speedway management announced that Sunday May 31 would be the designated rain date, the first time the race would be permitted to run on a Sunday. However, despite a brief rain delay on race morning, the full 500 miles was completed Saturday, and Sunday was not needed.

This would be the last Indy 500 that was scheduled for the traditional fixed date of May 30. Through 1970, Memorial Day was a fixed date holiday observed on May 30 regardless of the day of the week. For 1970, the date of May 30 fell on a Saturday. From 1911 to 1970, the race was scheduled for May 30, regardless of the day of the week, unless May 30 fell on a Sunday. In those cases, the race would be scheduled for Monday May 31. The Uniform Monday Holiday Act would take effect in 1971, and for 1971 and 1972, the race would be scheduled for the Saturday of Memorial Day weekend. In 1973, it was scheduled for Monday (but rain delayed it until Wednesday). From 1974 onward, it was scheduled for the Sunday of Memorial Day weekend. From 1974 onward, the race would only be held on May 30 if that date fell on a Sunday.

The annual Carburetion Days practice session, along with pit stop practice, on Wednesday May 27 was closed to the public.

Race schedule — May, 1970
Sun	Mon	Tue	Wed	Thu	Fri	Sat
					1 Practice	2 Practice
3 Practice	4 Practice	5 Practice	6 Practice	7 Practice	8 Practice	9 Practice
10; Practice	11; Practice	12; Practice	13; Practice	14; Practice	15; Practice	16; Pole Day
17; Time Trials	18; Practice	19; Practice	20; Practice	21; Practice	22; Practice	23; Time Trials
24; Bump Day	25	26	27; Carb Day	28; Parade	29; Meeting	30; Indy 500
31; Rain date						

Color	Notes
Green	Practice
Dark Blue	Time trials
Silver	Race day
Red	Rained out*
Blank	No track activity

* Includes days where track
activity was significantly
limited due to rain

== Practice and time trials ==
Al Unser, Sr. set the fastest speed during practice, with a lap of 171.233 mph. Unser led the speed chart on five of the practice days, and was the only driver to crack the 170 mph barrier during the first two weeks. A. J. Foyt (169.173 mph) and Art Pollard (169.1 mph) were close behind.

John Cannon wrecked on Sunday May 10, and was unable to qualify. On Monday May 11, defending race winner Mario Andretti spun and wrecked in turn four. His car hit the inside wall twice, and the car was heavily damaged. Andretti was not injured.

On Tuesday May 12, Dennis Hulme's car caught fire in turn three. He bailed from the moving machine, suffering burns to his hands and feet. He withdrew due to the injuries.

=== Pole Day – Saturday May 16 ===
Al Unser, Sr. won the pole position over Johnny Rutherford by 0.01 seconds, a record closest margin for the pole position at the time. A. J. Foyt rounded out the "all over 170 mph" front row. Unser's pole speed of 170.221 mph (his fastest single lap was 170.358 mph) was not a record – which marked the first time since the 1940s that two consecutive years went by without track records set during time trials at Indy.

Rain halted pole day qualifying at 3:42 p.m. with 17 cars in the field . A few cars (namely Lloyd Ruby, Gary Bettenhausen, and Peter Revson) were still waiting in line when the rains came. USAC officials closed the track for the day, and those cars were deemed ineligible for the pole round. In subsequent years, the rules would be changed to allow all cars in the original qualifying draw order at least one chance to make an attempt during the pole round, regardless if it extended into an additional calendar day due to rain.

Rookie Tony Adamowicz suffered bad luck during his attempt. On his first qualifying lap, the yellow light was turned on by error. He slowed down, and his first lap was turned in at 160.829 mph. The green light came back on moments later, and he completed the run. Although he had two laps over 166 mph, his first lap pulled his average down to 164.820 mph, and made him the second-slowest car in the field for the day.

Pos	No.	Name	Speed (mph)	Notes
1	2	Al Unser	170.221	
2	18	Johnny Rutherford	170.213	
3	7	A. J. Foyt	170.004	
4	11	Roger McCluskey	169.213	
5	66	Mark Donohue	168.911	
6	10	Art Pollard	168.595	
7	3	Bobby Unser	168.508	
8	1	Mario Andretti	168.209	
9	31	Jim Malloy	167.973	
10	84	George Snider	167.660	
11	48	Dan Gurney	166.860	
12	9	Mike Mosley	166.651	
13	27	LeeRoy Yarbrough	166.613	
14	97	Bruce Walkup	166.459	
15	38	Rick Muther R	165.654	
—	36	Tony Adamowicz R	164.820	Bumped by #58
—	92	Steve Krisiloff R	162.448	Bumped by #89
—	5	Gordon Johncock	—	Flagged off
—	5	Gordon Johncock	—	Waved off
—	95	Sam Posey R	—	Blown engine
—	23	Mel Kenyon	—	Pulled off
—	76	Kevin Bartlett R	—	Waved off
—	94	Bentley Warren R	—	Pulled off
—	93	Greg Weld R	—	Crash
—	74	Jim McElreath	—	Pulled off

=== Second Day – Sunday May 17 ===
Three drivers shut out from the pole round came back to qualify on the second day. Peter Revson (167.942 mph) was the 9th-fastest car in the field, but lined up 18th due to being a second day qualifier. Lloyd Ruby went out for his first attempt, but when he raised his hand to signify the intent to start his attempt, the officials did not see it, and inadvertently waved him off. After he persuaded the officials for a do-over, he had a lap of 169.428 mph, but burned a piston on the fourth and final lap. The incident drew the ire of the team, as they felt the officials cost them a chance to be the day's fastest qualifier (for having run the extra laps). Ruby went out again later in the day with a new engine, but waved off after one slow lap.

Pos	No.	Name	Speed (mph)	Notes
16	73	Peter Revson	167.942	
17	5	Gordon Johncock	167.015	
18	15	Joe Leonard	166.898	
19	75	Carl Williams	166.590	
20	16	Gary Bettenhausen	166.451	
21	20	George Follmer	166.052	
22	23	Mel Kenyon	165.906	
23	83	Donnie Allison R	165.662	
24	22	Wally Dallenbach Sr.	165.601	
—	74	Jim McElreath	163.592	Bumped by #32
—	19	Ronnie Bucknum	—	Waved off
—	12	Lloyd Ruby	—	Blown engine
—	76	Kevin Bartlett R	—	Waved off
—	12	Lloyd Ruby	—	Pulled off
—	56	Jim Hurtubise	—	

=== Third Day – Saturday May 23 ===
After a disappointing first weekend, Lloyd Ruby rebounded to complete his qualifying attempt at 168.895 mph. A busy day saw 14 attempts, and the field was filled to 33 cars. Two drivers (Bentley Warren and Tony Adamowicz) were bumped.

Pos	No.	Name	Speed (mph)	Notes
25	25	Lloyd Ruby	168.895	
26	32	Jack Brabham	166.397	Bumped #74
27	19	Ronnie Bucknum	166.136	
28	93	Greg Weld R	166.121	
29	89	Jerry Grant	165.983	Bumped #92
30	58	Bill Vukovich II	165.753	Bumped #36
31	44	Dick Simon R	165.548	Bumped #94
32	67	Sammy Sessions	165.373	
—	77	Kevin Bartlett R	165.259	Bumped by #14
—	94	Bentley Warren R	164.805	Bumped by #44
—	56	Jim Hurtubise	—	Incomplete
—	78	Larry Dickson	—	Pulled off
—	50	Arnie Knepper	—	Waved off
—	17	John Cannon R	—	Waved off

=== Bump Day – Sunday May 24 ===
Jim McElreath put the fourth Foyt entry in the field, bumping Bartlett. No other cars, however, were able to show enough speed to make the field. Jigger Sirois, infamous for missing the 1969 race, fell far short in Jack Adam's Turbine car.

Pos	No.	Name	Speed (mph)	Notes
33	14	Jim McElreath	166.821	Bumped #77
—	53	Arnie Knepper	165.320	Too slow
—	54	Jigger Sirois	164.692	Too slow
—	99	Denny Zimmerman	158.912	Too slow
—	8	Larry Dickson	158.479	Too slow
—	21	John Cannon	—	Waved off
—	95	Sam Posey	—	Crash

== Starting grid ==
Row	Inside		Middle		Outside	
1	2	(United States) Al Unser	18	(United States) Johnny Rutherford	7	(United States) A. J. Foyt W
2	11	(United States) Roger McCluskey	66	(United States) Mark Donohue	10	(United States) Art Pollard
3	3	(United States) Bobby Unser W	1	(United States) Mario Andretti W	31	(United States) Jim Malloy
4	84	(United States) George Snider	48	(United States) Dan Gurney	9	(United States) Mike Mosley
5	27	(United States) LeeRoy Yarbrough	97	(United States) Bruce Walkup	38	(United States) Rick Muther R
6	73	(United States) Peter Revson	5	(United States) Gordon Johncock	15	(United States) Joe Leonard
7	75	(United States) Carl Williams	16	(United States) Gary Bettenhausen	20	(United States) George Follmer
8	23	(United States) Mel Kenyon	83	(United States) Donnie Allison R	22	(United States) Wally Dallenbach Sr.
9	25	(United States) Lloyd Ruby	32	(Australia) Jack Brabham	19	(United States) Ronnie Bucknum
10	93	(United States) Greg Weld R	89	(United States) Jerry Grant	58	(United States) Bill Vukovich II
11	44	(United States) Dick Simon R	67	(United States) Sammy Sessions	14	(United States) Jim McElreath

R Indianapolis 500 rookie
W Indianapolis 500 winner

=== Alternates ===
- First alternate: Arnie Knepper (#50, #53, #96)

=== Failed to qualify ===
- Tony Adamowicz R (#36, #78)
- Chris Amon R (#21, #73, #75)
- Sonny Ates (#58, #59)
- Kevin Bartlett R (#76, #77)
- Tom Bigelow R (#34)
- John Cannon R (#17, #21)
- Larry Cannon R (#47)
- Larry Dickson (#8, #78)
- Darrell Dockery R (#62)
- Charlie Glotzbach (#45)
- Denny Hulme (#75)
- Jim Hurtubise (#56)
- Bruce Jacobi R (#71)
- Jerry Karl R (#52)
- Steve Krisiloff R (#92, #99)
- Lee Kunzman R (#77, #99)
- Al Loquasto R (#26, #35, #99)
- Bruce McLaren R (#5, #79)
- Butch Morley R (#63)
- Carlos Pairetti R (#8)
- Sam Posey R (#95)
- Bill Puterbaugh R (#90)
- Bill Simpson R (#28)
- Jigger Sirois R (#54, #72)
- Bud Tingelstad (#35)
- Bob Veith (#90)
- Bentley Warren R (#94)
- Denny Zimmerman R (#50, #98, #99)

== Race recap ==
=== Start ===
Rain delayed the start of the race by about 25 minutes. On the final pace lap, the field was coming through turn four to take the green flag. Suddenly, Jim Malloy on the outside of the third row, suffered a rear suspension failure, and smacked the outside wall. His car veered across the track to the inside, but narrowly avoided contact with any other car. The field was halted on the mainstretch under the red flag to clean up the accident. During the delay, teams were permitted to top off their fuel tanks, after burning three laps of methanol.

The field was restarted after the red flag, and 32 cars took the green flag. Johnny Rutherford swept across to take the lead into turn one. Down the backstretch, Al Unser Sr. tucked in behind, and took the lead going into turn three. Unser led the first lap.

Lloyd Ruby, who started 25th, notably passed ten cars on the first lap. By the third lap, Ruby was in the top ten.

=== First half ===
The early laps focused on the mad charge of Lloyd Ruby, who was up to 5th place by about lap 28. The yellow flag came out when Art Pollard blew an engine. Under the caution, Mario Andretti was forced to make an unscheduled pit stop to repair loose bodywork. He rejoined the race, but lost many positions.

As the race passed the 100-mile mark, Al Unser Sr. led, with Johnny Rutherford running second, and A. J. Foyt and Lloyd Ruby battling for third.

Al Unser Sr. led the first 48 laps. He gave up the lead to A. J. Foyt during a pit stop on lap 49. One lap later, Foyt entered the pits, giving the lead to Lloyd Ruby. Suddenly Ruby was given the black flag for smoke due to broken drive gears. Ruby's dramatic race was over after completing only 54 laps. Meanwhile, Johnny Rutherford stalled exiting the pits, losing considerable track position.

Unser re-took the lead on lap 54, and led until the halfway point. Mario Andretti once again had to make an unscheduled pit stop, this time to change the right rear tire. Through most of the race, he was experiencing handling issues with the right rear suspension.

=== Second half ===
Al Unser moved back to the front on lap 106, and he would not relinquish the lead. Johnny Rutherford, who was a factor in the first half, dropped out after 135 laps due to a broken header.

Roger McCluskey, who had dropped out on lap 62 with suspension damage, relieved Mel Kenyon on lap 112.

On lap 172, Roger McCluskey (driving for Kenyon), spun going into turn three, and crashed hard into the outside wall. Ronnie Bucknum was collected in the crash. Sammy Sessions locked up the brakes and nearly slid into the crashed cars. Sessions gained control, weaved his way through, and continued in the race. Spilled fuel started pouring from one of the crashed cars, and a small fire broke out. As the field approached the scene, several cars got into the fluid and spun. Wally Dallenbach and Jack Brabham spun but continued. Mario Andretti nearly spun out, but he made it through the scene unscathed. The fire was quickly extinguished, but what turned out to be the final yellow light of the race was on for over 14 minutes (lap 172 through lap 181) to clear the track.

=== Finish ===
With about 25 laps to go, Al Unser Sr. had lapped the entire field. Unser's crew gave him the "E-Z" sign on his chalkboard, and both Mark Donohue and A. J. Foyt got their lap back.

With Unser leading comfortably, the focus became the battle for second between Mark Donohue and A. J. Foyt. With only a handful of laps left, Foyt suddenly slowed in turn one. He pulled to the apron, but stayed out on the track attempting to nurse the car to the finish line.

Al Unser Sr. led a total of 190 laps en route to his first Indy victory. Unser won by 32.19 seconds over second place Mark Donohue. He finished over three minutes ahead of third place Dan Gurney in what would be Gurney's final 500 as a driver. A very slow A. J. Foyt fell to 10th in the final standings.

== Box score ==
Finish	Start	No	Name	Chassis	Engine	Tire	Qual	Laps	Status
1	1	2	(United States) Al Unser	Colt	Ford V-8	F	170.221	200	155.749 mph
2	5	66	(United States) Mark Donohue	Lola	Ford V-8	G	168.911	200	+32.19
3	11	48	(United States) Dan Gurney	Eagle	Offenhauser	G	166.860	200	+3:12.21
4	23	83	(United States) Donnie Allison R	Eagle	Ford V-8	G	165.662	200	+3:44.82
5	33	14	(United States) Jim McElreath	Coyote	Ford V-8	G	166.821	200	+4:30.89
6	8	1	(United States) Mario Andretti W	McNamara	Ford V-8	F	168.209	199	Flagged
7	29	89	(United States) Jerry Grant	Eagle	Offenhauser	G	165.983	198	Flagged
8	15	38	(United States) Rick Muther R	Brawner	Offenhauser	G	165.654	197	Flagged
9	19	75	(United States) Carl Williams	McLaren	Offenhauser	G	166.590	197	Flagged
10	3	7	(United States) A. J. Foyt W	Coyote	Ford V-8	G	170.004	195	Flagged
11	7	3	(United States) Bobby Unser W	Eagle	Ford V-8	G	168.508	192	Flagged
12	32	67	(United States) Sammy Sessions	Vollstedt	Ford V-8	G	165.373	190	Flagged
13	26	32	(Australia) Jack Brabham	Brabham	Offenhauser	G	166.397	175	Piston
14	31	44	(United States) Dick Simon R	Vollstedt	Ford V-8	F	165.548	168	Flagged
15	27	19	(United States) Ronnie Bucknum	Morris	Ford V-8	G	166.136	162	Crash T3
16	22	23	(United States) Mel Kenyon (Roger McCluskey Laps 112–160)	Coyote	Offenhauser	G	165.906	160	Crash T3
17	24	22	(United States) Wally Dallenbach Sr.	Eagle	Ford V-8	G	165.601	143	Coil
18	2	18	(United States) Johnny Rutherford	Eagle	Offenhauser	G	170.213	135	Header
19	13	27	(United States) LeeRoy Yarbrough	Vollstedt	Ford V-8	G	166.559	107	Turbo Gear
20	10	84	(United States) George Snider	Coyote	Ford V-8	G	167.660	105	Suspension
21	12	9	(United States) Mike Mosley	Eagle	Offenhauser	G	166.651	96	Radiator
22	16	73	(United States) Peter Revson	McLaren	Offenhauser	G	167.942	87	Magneto
23	30	58	(United States) Bill Vukovich II	Brabham	Offenhauser	F	165.753	78	Clutch
24	18	15	(United States) Joe Leonard	Colt	Ford V-8	F	166.898	73	Switch
25	4	11	(United States) Roger McCluskey	Scorpion	Ford V-8	G	169.213	62	Suspension
26	20	16	(United States) Gary Bettenhausen	Gerhardt	Offenhauser	G	166.451	55	Valve
27	25	25	(United States) Lloyd Ruby	Mongoose	Offenhauser	F	168.895	54	Drive Gear
28	17	5	(United States) Gordon Johncock	Gerhardt	Offenhauser	G	167.015	45	Piston
29	14	97	(United States) Bruce Walkup	Mongoose	Offenhauser	F	166.459	44	Timing Gear
30	6	10	(United States) Art Pollard	Kingfish	Offenhauser	F	168.595	28	Piston
31	21	20	(United States) George Follmer	Brawner	Ford V-8	F	166.052	18	Oil Gasket
32	28	93	(United States) Greg Weld R	Gerhardt	Offenhauser	F	166.121	12	Piston
33	9	31	(United States) Jim Malloy	Gerhardt	Offenhauser	F	167.895	0	Crash T4

Note: Relief drivers in parentheses

W Former Indianapolis 500 winner

R Indianapolis 500 Rookie

=== Race statistics ===
Lap Leaders
Laps	Leader
1–48	Al Unser Sr.
49	A. J. Foyt
50–51	Lloyd Ruby
52	Mark Donohue
53	Jack Brabham
54–100	Al Unser Sr.
101	A. J. Foyt
102–105	Mark Donohue
106–200	Al Unser Sr.

Total laps led
Driver	Laps
Al Unser Sr.	190
Mark Donohue	5
A. J. Foyt	2
Lloyd Ruby	2
Jack Brabham	1

Yellow Lights: 3 for 24 minutes, 45 seconds
Laps*	Reason
Pace lap	Jim Malloy crash in turn 4 (3:15; red flag)
28–30	Art Pollard blown engine (4:00)
54–56	Lloyd Ruby engine fire (3:40)
172–181	McCluskey, Bucknum crash in turn 3 (17:45)
* – Approximate lap counts

Tire participation chart
Supplier	No. of starters
Goodyear	22
Firestone	11*
* – Denotes race winner

== Broadcasting ==
=== Radio ===
The race was carried live on the IMS Radio Network. Sid Collins served as chief announcer for the 23rd consecutive year. Len Sutton served as "driver expert" for the fifth year. At the conclusion of the race, Lou Palmer reported from victory lane. The entire on-air crew remained mostly consistent from 1966 to 1969. The broadcast came on-air at 11:30 am local time, with a thirty-minute pre-race show scheduled. However, the rain delay increased the pre-race coverage to almost an hour. After the death of Bill Dean, Jack Morrow assumed the role of producer.

The broadcast was carried by over 1,000 affiliates in all fifty states, AFN, the CBC, and reached locations such as Vietnam and had four foreign language translations. The broadcast had an estimated 120 million listeners worldwide.

Among the celebrity interviews Sid Collins conducted in the booth were Edie Adams, Dennis Hulme, Billy Shaw, Chris Economaki (ABC Sports), Larry Bisceglia, Sam Hanks, Pete DePaolo, Bill Holland, Senator Vance Hartke, Tony Hulman, Duke Nalon, Johnnie Parsons, and J. C. Agajanian. Astronaut Pete Conrad, who was a fellow passenger with Tony Hulman in the pace car for the second year in a row, was also interviewed during the pre-race coverage.

Indianapolis Motor Speedway Radio Network
Booth Announcers	Turn Reporters	Pit/garage reporters
Chief Announcer: Sid Collins; Driver expert: Len Sutton; Statistician: John DeCamp; Historian: Donald Davidson	Turn 1: Mike Ahern; Turn 2: Howdy Bell; Backstretch: Doug Zink; Turn 3: Ron Carrell; Turn 4: Jim Shelton	Chuck Marlowe (north); Luke Walton (center); Lou Palmer (south)

=== Television ===
The race was carried in the United States on ABC's Wide World of Sports. The broadcast aired on Saturday June 6. Jim McKay anchored the broadcast with Rodger Ward and Chris Economaki as analysts. Ward drove the pace car at the start of the race. It was the last time the "500" was not seen on over-the-air television the day of the race.

For the final time, the race was shown live on MCA closed-circuit television in numerous theaters across the United States. Charlie Brockman served as anchor.

The "Wide World Of Sports" broadcast has re-aired on ESPN Classic starting in May 2011.

ABC Television
Booth Announcers	Pit/garage reporters
Announcer: Jim McKay; Color: Rodger Ward	Chris Economaki

== Notes ==
=== See also ===
- 1970 USAC Championship Car season

=== Works cited ===
- 1970 Indianapolis 500 Press Information – Daily Trackside Summary
- Indianapolis 500 History: Race & All-Time Stats – Official Site
- 1970 Indianapolis 500 at RacingReference.info
- 1970 Indianapolis 500 Radio Broadcast, Indianapolis Motor Speedway Radio Network

=== Bibliography ===
- Higdon, Hal (May 29, 2022). Thirty Days in May: The Day-by-Day Drama of the 1970 Indy 500. Octane Press. ISBN 978-1642340679.

1969 Indianapolis 500; Mario Andretti	1970 Indianapolis 500; Al Unser	1971 Indianapolis 500; Al Unser
