= Denny Zimmerman =

American racing driver

Denny Zimmerman (born December 14, 1940, Glastonbury, Connecticut), is an American retired racing driver. Zimmerman raced in the USAC Champ Car series from 1968 to 1972 with 16 career starts, including the 1971 and 1972 Indianapolis 500. Of those starts, his only top ten finish was the 1971 Indianapolis 500, where he finished eighth and was named Rookie of the Year.

== Career award ==
Zimmerman was inducted in the New England Auto Racers Hall of Fame in 2000.

=== Indy 500 results ===
Year	Chassis	Engine	Start	Finish
1969	Gerhardt	Chevrolet	Failed to Qualify	
1970	Gerhardt	Offy	Failed to Qualify	
1971	Vollstedt	Offy	28th	8th
1972	McLaren	Offy	28th	19th
1974	Cecil	Offy	Failed to Qualify	

== Notes ==
Sporting positions
Preceded by Donnie Allison	Indianapolis 500; Rookie of the Year; 1971	Succeeded by Mike Hiss
