= Bruce Walkup =

American racing driver (born 1944)

- Born: Vincent Bruce Walkup; August 21, 1944 (age 82) Downey, California, U.S.

Champ Car career
- 35 races run over 6 years
- Years active: 1967–1972
- Best finish: 29th – 1968
- First race: 1967 Ted Horn Memorial (DuQuoin)
- Last race: 1971 California 500 (Ontario)
Wins	Podiums	Poles
0	0	2

Bruce Walkup (born August 21, 1944, in Downey, California) is a retired American racecar driver.

Walkup raced in the USAC Championship Car series in the 1967–1971 seasons, with 35 career starts, including the 1969 and 1970 Indianapolis 500 races. He finished in the top-ten 11 times, with his best finish in fourth position in 1969 at Sacramento.

Walkup was formerly the president of the Indiana State Fair board.
