= Lotus 64 =

- Category: USAC IndyCar
- Constructor: Team Lotus
- Designers: Colin Chapman; Maurice Philippe
- Predecessor: Lotus 56
- Successor: Lotus 96T

Technical specifications
- Chassis: Aluminium monocoque.
- Suspension (front): Double wishbone, coil springs over dampers.
- Suspension (rear): Double wishbone, coil springs over dampers.
- Length: 155.9 in (396 cm)
- Width: 73 in (185 cm)
- Height: 31 in (79 cm)
- Axle track: Front: 60 in (152 cm); Rear: 60 in (152 cm)
- Wheelbase: 95.9 in (244 cm)
- Engine: Ford Indy V8 engine 2,605 cc (159.0 cu in) DOHC 90° V8, turbocharged, mid-mounted.
- Transmission: Lotus / Hewland 3 speed manual gearbox. Four-wheel drive
- Weight: 635 kg (1,400 lb)

Competition history
- Notable entrants: Team Lotus
- Notable drivers: (United Kingdom) Graham Hill (Austria) Jochen Rindt (United States) Mario Andretti

The Lotus 64 was a four-wheel drive Ford V8 turbo powered racing car built by Lotus for the 1969 Indianapolis 500. All three entries were retired from practice.

== History ==
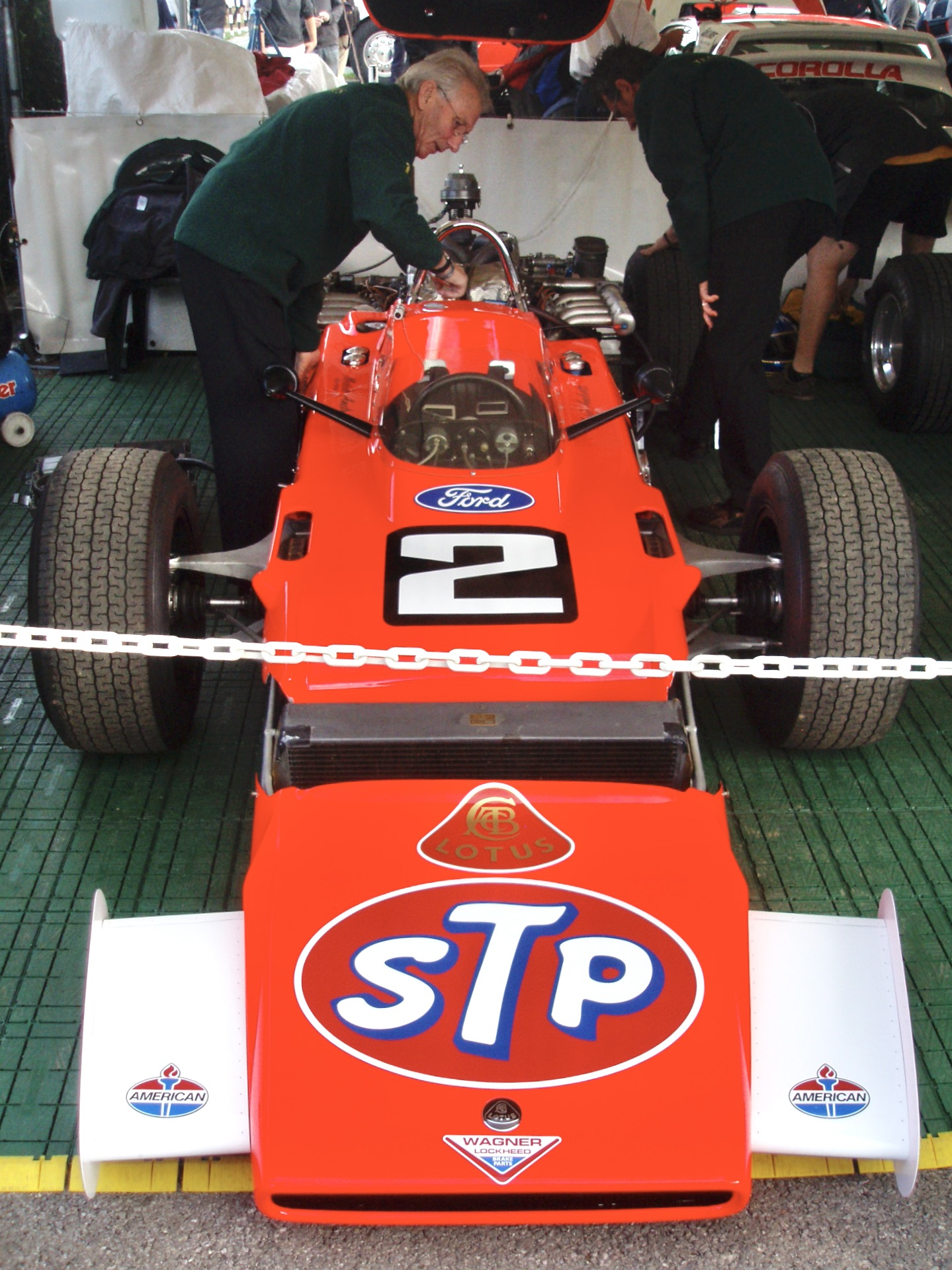
Lotus 64, Goodwood Festival of Speed 2008

After the Lotus 29, Lotus 34, Lotus 38 and Lotus 56, the 64 was the fifth and final race car Colin Chapman built for USAC category racing. The United States Automobile Club had decided in the spring of 1969 that turbines and four-wheel drive would be banned in the USAC racing series.

Because the 56 had a gas turbine, Lotus decided to build a new car, still with 4WD. The project was funded by Ford who supplied the Ford Indy V8 engine in turbo version, and by STP. Andy Granatelli, Chief Executive Officer of STP and the racing team owner, had arranged the deal. Of the three 64s built, Mario Andretti would drive the STP car, Graham Hill and Jochen Rindt the two factory cars that were also painted in the colours of the sponsor.

Maurice Philippe carried over as much as possible from the Lotus 56 to the 64. The long monocoque and the suspension was used in the new car. The biggest difference, apart from adding front and rear wings, was the engine. Because the 2.6-litre turbocharged Ford engine contributed more than 700 horsepower, a new gearbox was developed.

All three cars took part in practice, but Andretti had a serious accident and destroyed his 64 completely. The accident was triggered by an overheated wheel hub. Since this overheating also occurred in the two factory cars, the vehicles were withdrawn, despite setting fast practice times.

The cars were shipped to England and never used in a race. Almost forty years after their construction, a restored Lotus 64 appeared at the Goodwood Festival of Speed in 2008.
