= Eagle 69 =

Eagle 69 (Eagle Mk.7)
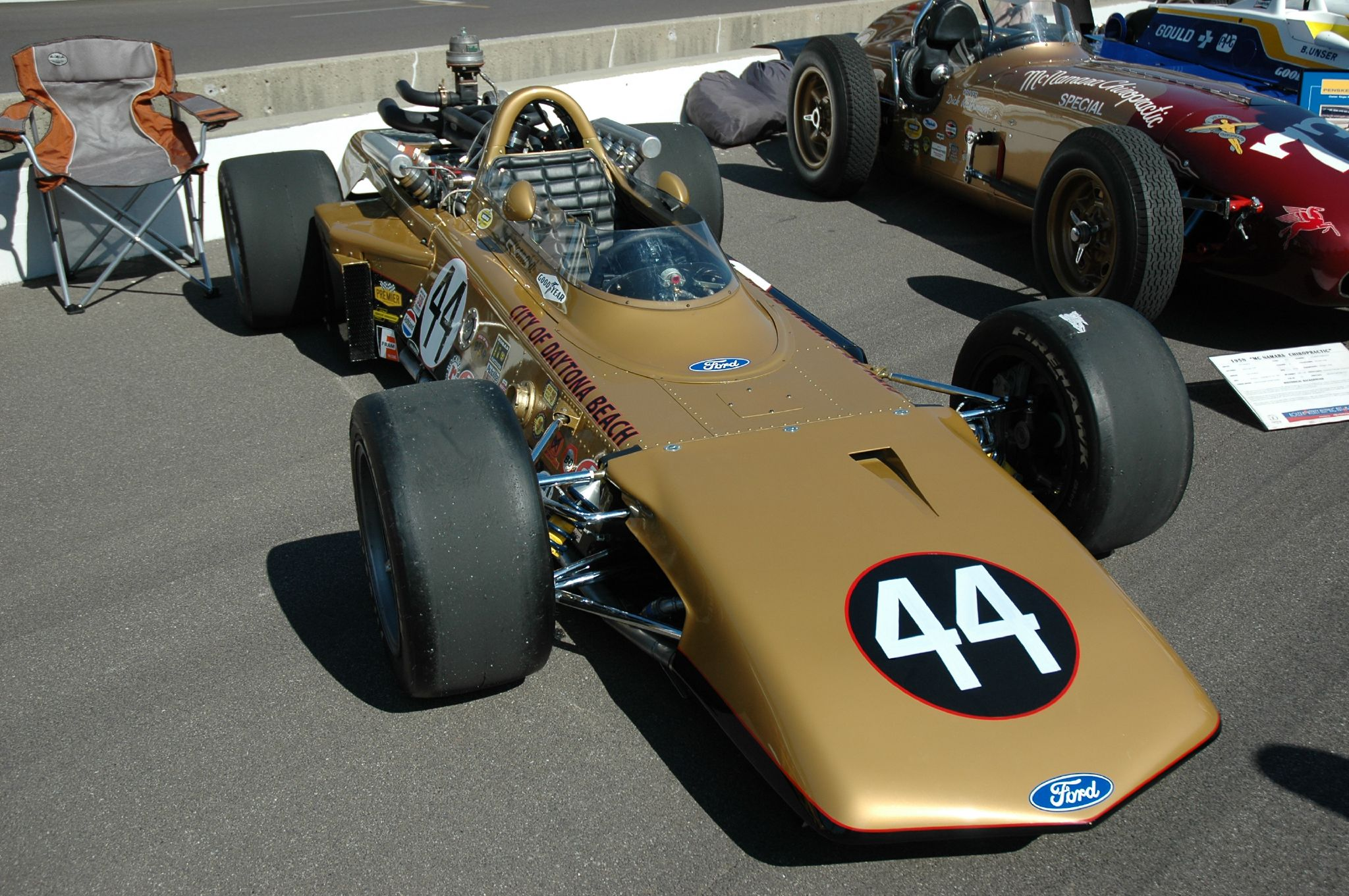
- Category: USAC IndyCar
- Constructor: (United States) AAR
- Designer(s): Tony Southgate

Technical specifications
- Chassis: Aluminum monocoque
- Suspension (front): Double wishbones, coil springs over shock absorbers, anti-roll bar
- Suspension (rear): Lower wishbones, top links, twin trailing arms, coil springs over shock absorbers, anti-roll bar
- Engine: Ford 159–320 cu in (2.6–5.2 L) turbocharged/NA DOHC V8 mid-engined, rear-wheel-drive
- Transmission: Hewland L.G.500 4-speed manual
- Weight: 1,442 lb (654 kg)
- Fuel: Methanol
- Brakes: Girling ventilated discs, 305mm (12 in) (fr/r)
- Tyres: Goodyear

Competition history
- Notable entrants: All American Racers
- Notable drivers: (United States) Dan Gurney (United States) Joe Leonard
- Debut: 1969 Jimmy Bryan 150
Wins	Poles
2	5

The Eagle 69, also known as the Eagle Mark 7, was an open-wheel race car developed and built by Dan Gurney's All American Racers team, designed to compete in USAC IndyCar racing, starting in the 1969 season. In its most powerful form, It was powered by a small-displacement turbocharged Ford V8 engine, capable of producing over 800 hp (600 kW).
