= Lotus 42 =

- Category: USAC IndyCar
- Constructor: Team Lotus
- Designer(s): Colin Chapman; Len Terry
- Predecessor: Lotus 38
- Successor: Lotus 56

Technical specifications
- Chassis: Aluminium monocoque.
- Suspension (front): Double wishbones, inboard coil springs over dampers.
- Suspension (rear): Reverse lower wishbones, top link, twin radius rods, coil springs over dampers, anti-roll bar
- Length: 155.9 in (396 cm)
- Width: 73 in (185 cm)
- Height: 31 in (79 cm)
- Axle track: Front: 60 in (152 cm); Rear: 60 in (152 cm)
- Wheelbase: 95.9 in (244 cm)
- Engine: Ford 4,195 cc (256.0 cu in) DOHC 90° V8, naturally aspirated, mid-mounted.
- Transmission: ZF 2DS-20 2-speed manual gearbox.
- Power: 520 hp (390 kW)
- Weight: 612 kg (1,349 lb)

Competition history
- Notable entrants: Team Lotus
- Notable drivers: (United Kingdom) Graham Hill
- Debut: 1967 Indianapolis 500

The Lotus 42 is an open-wheel race car built by Team Lotus for the 1967 Indianapolis 500. The car was unsuccessful that year, with Graham Hill retiring on lap 23 of the race.

== Development history ==
The Lotus 42 was designed to use the 4.2 litre version of the BRM P75 H16 engine. Unfortunately, this was even more unreliable than the 3 litre F1 variant, and was swiftly abandoned. The car was then fitted with a Ford Indy V8 engine.

== Race history ==
For the 1967 Indianapolis 500, 1966 winner Graham Hill was recruited to drive the 42. Starting from 31st place on the grid, he lasted 23 laps before piston failure ended his race. Thereafter the car was put up for sale but never raced again. A second chassis was eventually fitted with a 5 litre Chevrolet V8 engine and took part in the 1969 Canadian Formula A series, where it helped Bill Brack to third place overall.
