= Lotus 96T =

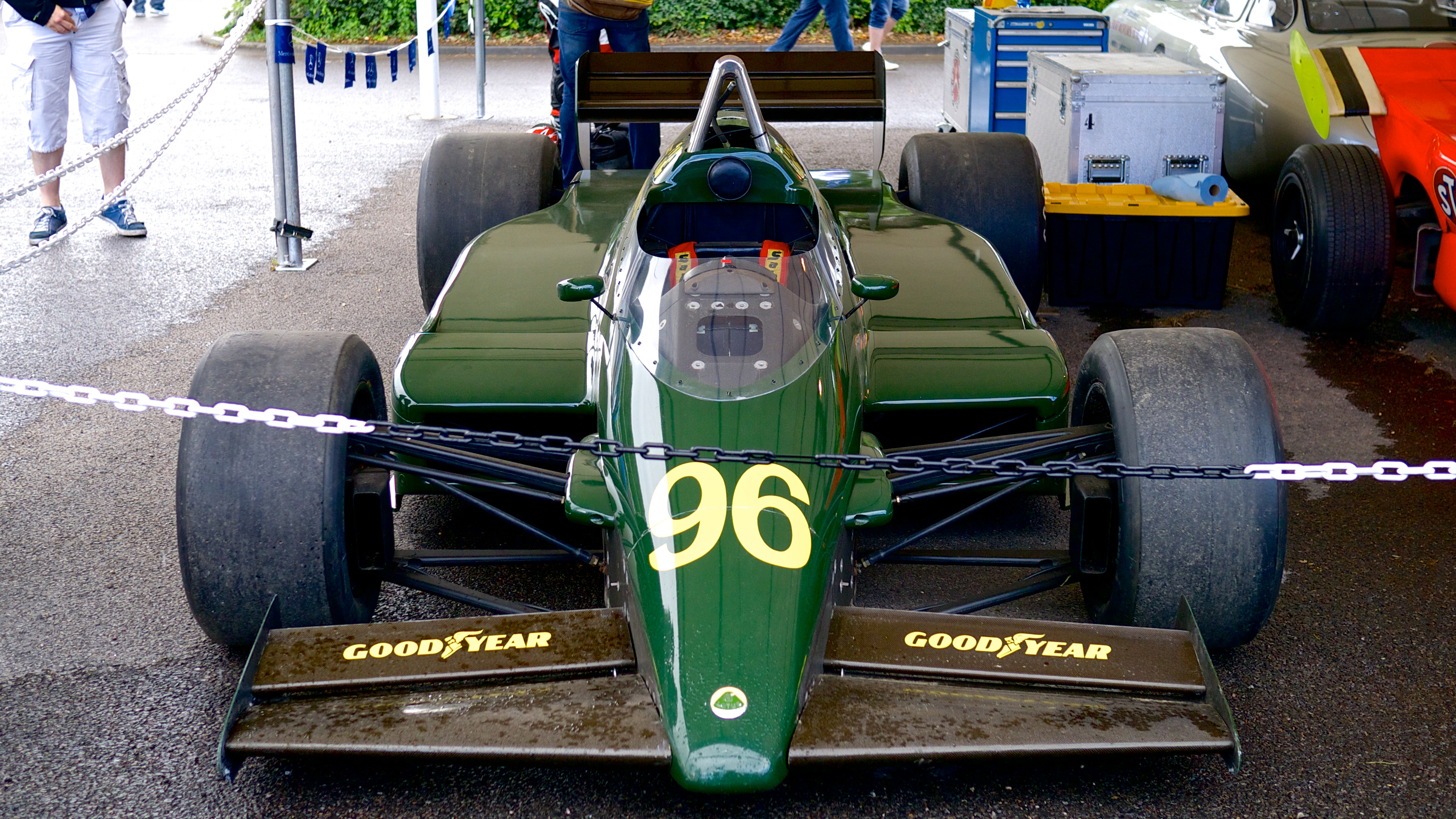
- The Lotus 96T at the Goodwood Festival of Speed in 2012.
- Designer: Gérard Ducarouge
- Predecessor: Lotus 64

Technical specifications
- Transmission: Hewland DGB

Competition history
- Debut: n/a
Entries	Races
0	0

The Lotus type 96T was Team Lotus's last Indycar.

The project was the brainchild of former Formula 2 team owner Roy Winkelmann. During the 1960s Winkelmann had proved successful running Brabhams and scoring successes with Jochen Rindt. However this team was to break up suddenly in 1969 with some of the core personnel (including Alan Rees) forming March Engineering.

Winkelmann then relocated himself in the United States and built up a large and diverse business empire. Following the creation of the CART series in 1979 Winkelmann saw a perceived blossoming of international interest and was once again lured to an opportunity to race again. However he did not wish to buy an "off-the-shelf" March or Lola chassis as was de rigueur in CART racing during the 1980s. Instead he initially approached Cosworth and obtained some assurances that they would be prepared to build "works" engines for his team. All teams in the championship were effectively running second-hand DFX engines at this point, with little input from Cosworth.

Winkelmann then approached Team Lotus and their new designer Gérard Ducarouge to obtain a bespoke chassis with the plan of competing and conquering CART within three years. Ducarouge enlisted Mike Coughlan to help design the chassis.

The 96T was Ducarouge's response to these requirements. Its tub, lines and suspension were similar to the Lotus 95T that was racing in the 1984 Formula One Championships, but with one significant design alteration. Ducarouge had foreseen that at a track like Indianapolis, the car stood the very real possibility of hitting a concrete retaining wall at over 200 mph (322 km/h), therefore the chassis was modified.

Since 1981 all Formula one Lotuses had been constructed of a carbon/Kevlar (Chapman Tartan) sandwich with the void between the two filled with Nomex paper foil. The Type 96T departed from this by having the void filled with a lightweight aluminium-foil honeycomb. This modification was significant as it built in extra strength at no cost to weight and was to lay the foundations for all future Lotus Formula 1 chassis.

Despite the project's promising beginnings it was to be the American CART establishment's lack of enthusiasm (interpreted by some as outward hostility) for a "works team" that was to effectively kill this project. The repercussions of this were to virtually guarantee none of the sponsorship that Winkelmann had originally been so confident of. Also with a lack of sponsorship many drivers were not willing to sacrifice their growing reputations with an unknown European team, despite the legacy that team came with.

The one and only prototype now resides with Classic Team Lotus.

== See also ==
- Ferrari 637
