= Ford Indy V8 engine =

Ford Indy V-8

Overview
- Manufacturer: Ford
- Production: 1963–1971 (Ford engine); 1972–1978 (Foyt-badged engine)

Layout
- Configuration: 90° V8
- Displacement: 159–320 cu in (2.61–5.24 L)
- Cylinder bore: 3.76–3.80 in (96–97 mm)
- Piston stroke: 2.87 in (73 mm)
- Valvetrain: 32-valve, DOHC, four-valves per cylinder
- Compression ratio: 10.2:1-12.5:1

Combustion
- Fuel system: Mechanical fuel injection
- Fuel type: Gasoline
- Oil system: Dry sump

Output
- Power output: 375–800 hp (280–597 kW)
- Torque output: 269–525 lb⋅ft (365–712 N⋅m)

Dimensions
- Dry weight: 350–406 lb (159–184 kg)

Chronology
- Successor: Ford-Cosworth Indy V8 engine

The Ford Indy V8 engine is a V8 engine, initially specially designed by Ford for Indy car racing, from 1963 onwards, with Lotus chassis and engine mounted in the rear to end the dominance of Offenhauser front-engine roadsters. The DOHC version won the 1965 Indianapolis 500 naturally-aspirated with 4.2 L (260 in^{3}) capacity, and again in 1966 and 1967 before the now turbocharged Offenhauser engine ended the streak in 1968 Indianapolis 500.

With added turbocharging and size reduced to 2.6 L (160 in^{3}), the Ford DOHC won three more Indy 500 from 1969 Indianapolis 500 to 1971 when Ford pulled out, handing over the design to AJ Foyt who continued until 1978, winning the Indy 500 in 1977 to add a seventh Indy win.

Concurrently, in England, Ford had since 1965 sponsored the successful Cosworth DFV Formula One engine, a more compact DOHC V8, designed with a 3.0 liter displacement. For the 1976 USAC Championship Car season, Ford returned to Indy car racing with the turbocharged 2.65 liter Ford-sponsored Cosworth DFX engine.

== History ==
IndyCars with Ford engines first competed in 1922 using a production-based Ford Model T engine equipped with a Frontenac head; racers continued using the "Fronty-Ford" thruout the 1920's and 30's. Later, in 1935, the Ford flathead V8 engine was used in the Miller-Ford racer.

=== 1963 engine ===
With the Offenhauser 4-cyclinder 4.4 L (270 in^{3}) engine mounted in front-engine roadsters dominating Indianapolis 500 since the 1930s, and with a "British Invasion" of successful nimble rear-mid-engine Formula One single seater coming to the United States, starting with Formula One World Champion Jack Brabham to the 1961 Indianapolis 500, it was time for a change. Mickey Thompson entered three rear-engine cars in the 1962 Indianapolis 500, but with a Buick V8 that lacked power. Driver Dan Gurney then arranged that European chassis maker Team Lotus, who would win their first F1 World Championship in 1963, would build the Lotus 29 for the 1963 Indianapolis 500, with Ford supplying a suitable engine. With the intakes as usual in the V, the 4,195 cc (256.0 in^{3}) normally aspirated pushrod Ford V8 with Weber carburetors produced 376 bhp (280 kW) through a Colotti T.37 gearbox. Eventually, Jim Clark finished second, and Dan Gurney finished seventh. Clark went on to win the 1963 Tony Bettenhausen 200, proving the design was competitive.

=== 1964–1967 DOHC engine ===
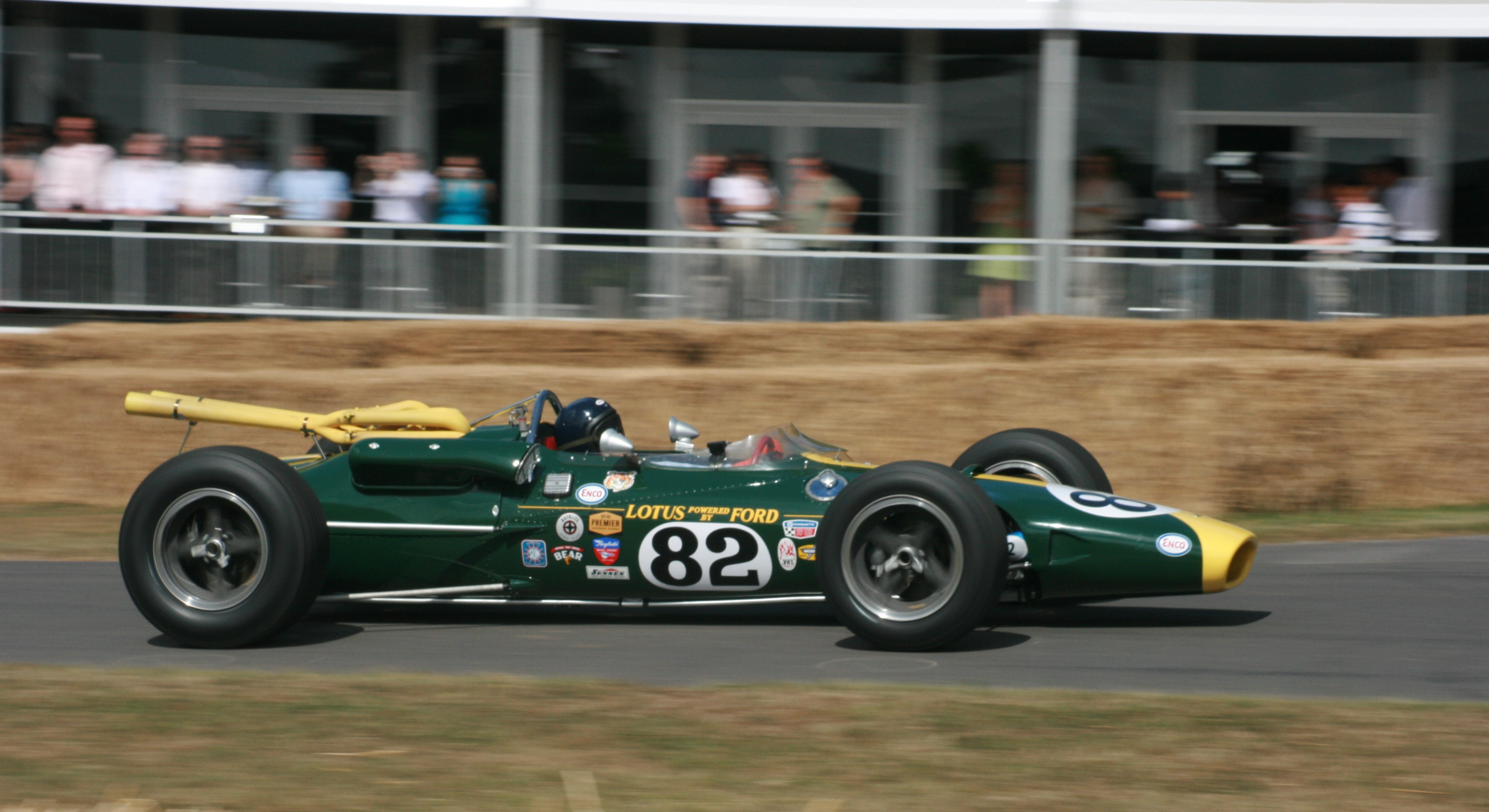
1965 Indianapolis 500-winning Lotus 38 with Ford DOHC V8

To gain power for 1964, double overhead camshafts (DOHC) were installed in the Lotus 34, in reverse manner, with the exhausts in the V, and intake trumpets at the sides. This four-cam 4,195 cc (256.0 in^{3}) DOHC Ford V8 with Hilborn fuel injection produced 425 bhp (317 kW), through a ZF 2DS20 gearbox. Clark qualified on pole for the 1964 Indianapolis 500, but when the Dunlop tyres caused Clark to crash, Gurney was retired. The team switched to Firestone rubber.

In 1965 A. J. Foyt won three USAC races in a Lotus 34 on his way to second in that year's championship, while Parnelli Jones finished second at 1965 Indianapolis 500 behind Jim Clark's improved Lotus 38. It was the first win for a rear-mid engined car, the first for Ford, and the first for a foreign-born driver in many decades.

The Ford DOHC engines were available for other teams. Graham Hill won the 1966 Indianapolis 500 with a Lola 90 chassis, and A. J. Foyt in 1967 in a Coyote 67 chassis.

=== 1968–1971 Turbocharged engine ===
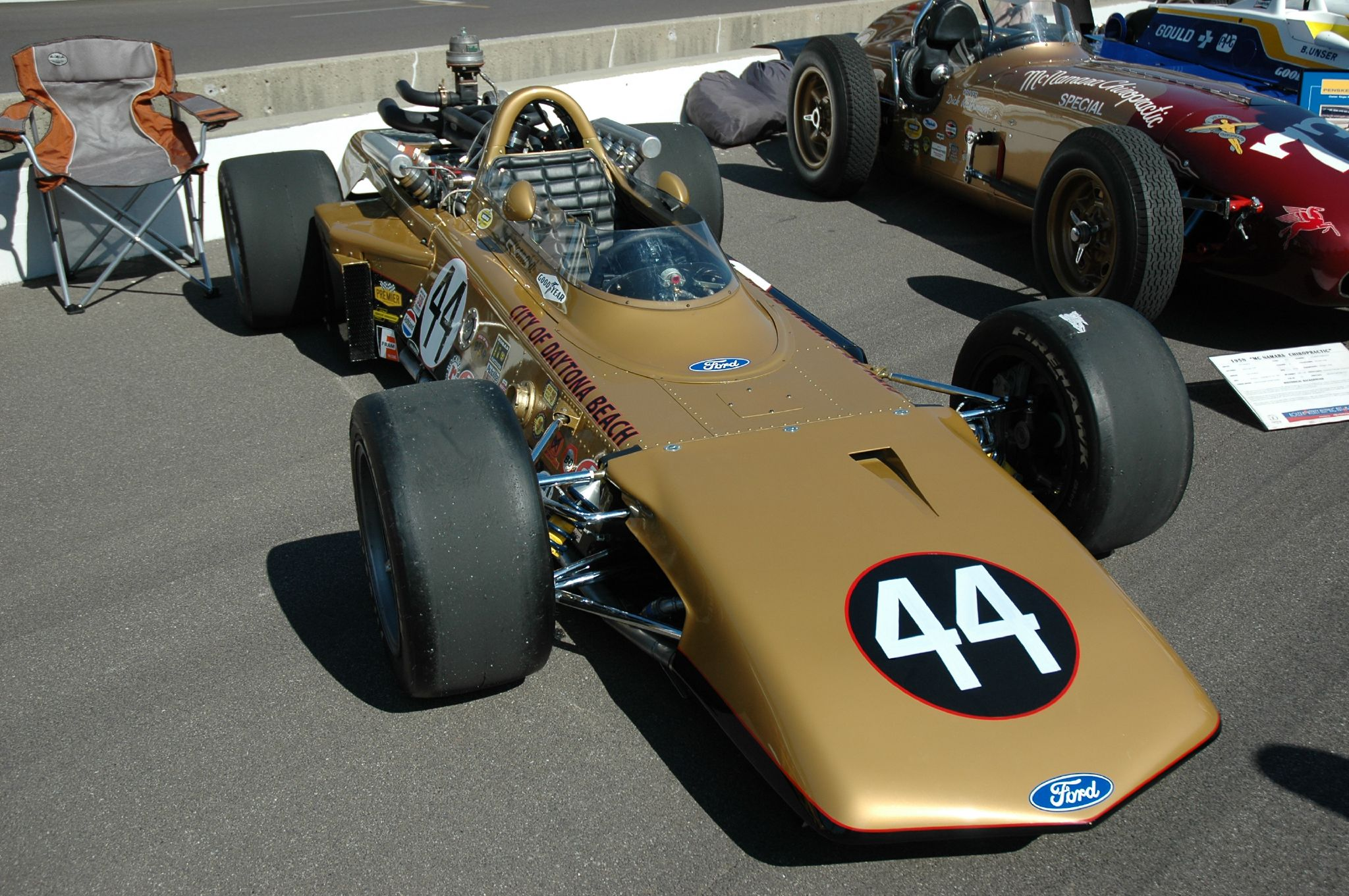
The Eagle 68, powered by a turbocharged Ford DOHC V8, driven to 6th place in the 1969 Indianapolis 500 by Joe Leonard

By 1968, Offenhauser was using turbocharged engines which had more power, winning the 1968 Indianapolis 500.

A smaller but Garrett turbocharged 159 cu in (2.61 L) Ford engine was introduced in 1968, and gave Mario Andretti the win in his Brawner Hawk chassis at the 1969 Indianapolis 500. This engine was used throughout the 1969 and 1970 seasons, until 1971 (their last season), after which Ford pulled-out and withdrew from the series for 1972.

==== 1969 Lotus 64 Turbocharged engine ====
Because the previous Lotus 56 AWD had a gas turbine engine, which was banned, Lotus had to use a new engine for the 1969 Indianapolis 500. The Lotus 64 project was funded by Ford who supplied a V8 turbo engine, and by STP. The four-wheel drive was paired to the new engine - 2.65-liter, turbocharged, making more than 700 horsepower. A wheel hub assembly overheated and Mario Andretti crashed the STP car in practice; the cars of Graham Hill and Jochen Rindt were retired before the Race.

=== 1966 F1 Ford 406 engine ===
Ford 406

Overview
- Manufacturer: Ford
- Production: 1966

Layout
- Configuration: 90° V-8
- Displacement: 3.0 L (183 cu in)
- Valvetrain: 32-valve, DOHC, four-valves per cylinder

Combustion
- Fuel system: Mechanical fuel injection
- Fuel type: Gasoline
- Oil system: Dry sump

Output
- Power output: 315 hp (235 kW)
- Torque output: 221 lb⋅ft (300 N⋅m)

The Ford 406 was a 3.0 L (180 cu in) Formula One engine, and was essentially a downsized variant of the Ford Indy V8 DOHC engine, commissioned by Bruce McLaren who had been involved since 1964 with the Ford GT40 program, winning the 1966 Le Mans 24h.

Made by third parties prior to the introduction of the highly successful Ford-sponsored Cosworth DFV engine in 1967, it was used in the McLaren M2B Formula One car for three races in the 1966 Formula One season.

Oil leak ended the first race in Monaco, and the team switched to other engines. In the last two heats in North America, the Ford V8 was again used with one finish for points.

=== 1973–1978 Foyt engine ===
Ford Motor Company pulled its factory support out of Indy/Championship car racing after the 1972 USAC season. A. J. Foyt obtained the rights to Ford's turbocharged DOHC V-8 Indy engine, and it was subsequently rebadged and rebranded as the Foyt V-8 engine.

The Foyt team further developed the powerplant, and ran the 161 cu in (2.64 L) Foyt V-8 engine from 1973 to 1978. A handful of other teams bought and ran Foyt V-8 engines during that timeframe as well. A. J. Foyt won the 1977 Indianapolis 500 in his Coyote chassis and the Foyt-badged engine.

== Applications ==
- Brawner Hawk
- Coyote 67
- Coyote 68
- Coyote/Kuzma
- Coyote 70
- Coyote 71
- Lola T80
- Lola T90/T92
- Lola T150/T153
- Lola T270/T272
- Lotus 29
- Lotus 34
- Lotus 38
- Lotus 42
- Lotus 64
- McNamara T-500
- McNamara T-501
