= Lola T90 =

Racing car designed and built by Reynard Racing Cars

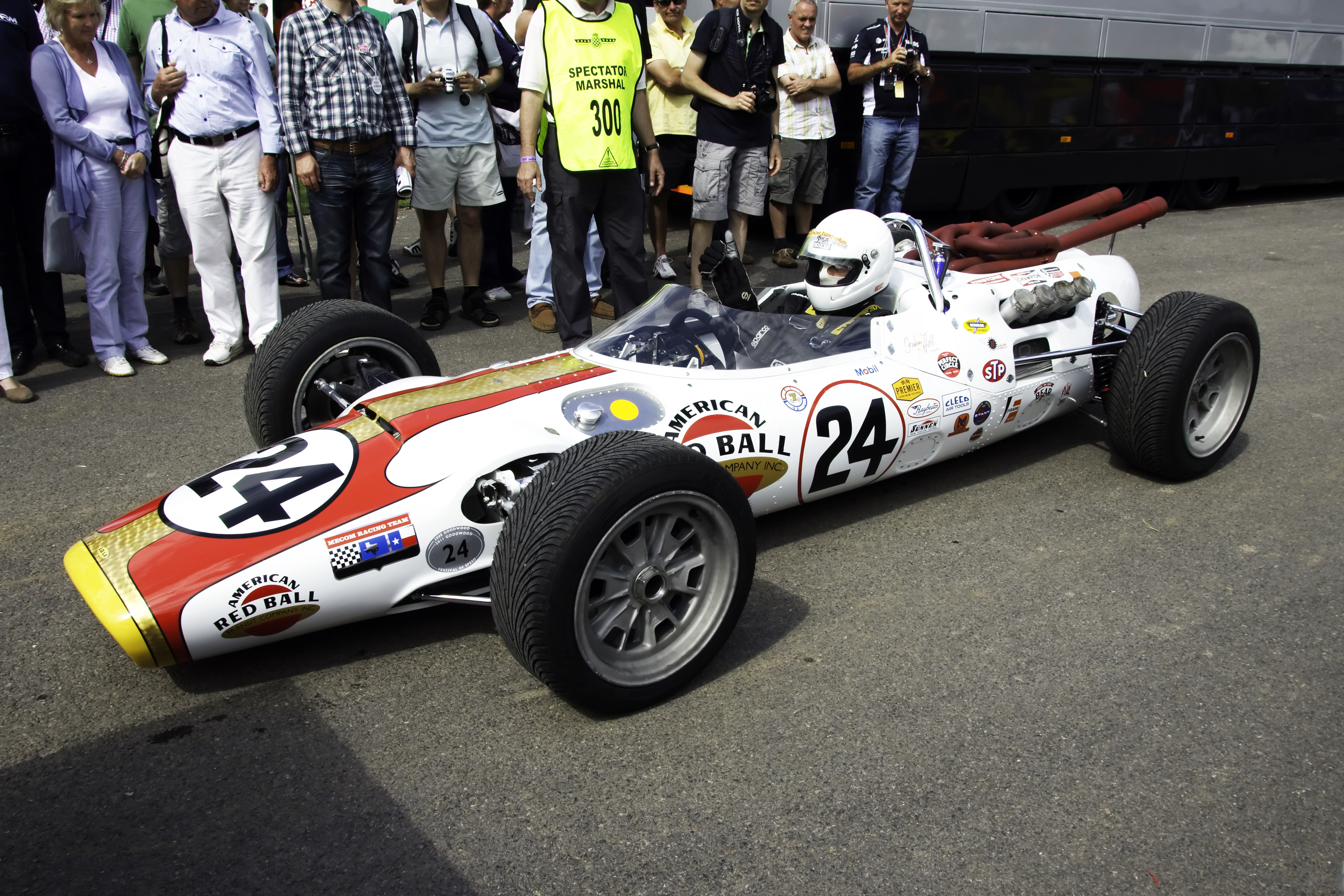
- Category: USAC IndyCar
- Constructor: Lola
- Predecessor: Lola T80
- Successor: Lola T150

Technical specifications
- Chassis: Aluminum monocoque and fiberglass body
- Engine: Ford 256 cu in (4.20 L) DOHC V8 N/A (1968, 1970); Offenhauser 159 cu in (2.6 L) DOHC I4 turbo (1969) mid-engined
- Transmission: 2-speed manual
- Weight: 1,400 lb (640 kg)
- Fuel: Methanol
- Tyres: Goodyear

Competition history
- Notable drivers: (United Kingdom) Graham Hill (United Kingdom) Jackie Stewart
- Debut: 1966 Indianapolis 500

The Lola T90 is a highly successful and competitive open-wheel racing car chassis, designed and built by Lola Cars to compete in the USAC IndyCar racing series, that won the 1966 Indianapolis 500, being driven by Graham Hill. It was powered by either the 425–500 hp (317–373 kW), naturally-aspirated, 256 cu in (4.20 L), Ford Indy V-8 engine, or the 168 cu in (2.75 L), 520 hp (390 kW), Offenhauser 4-cylinder turbo engine.
