= Lola T80 =

Open-wheel race car

The Lola T80 was an open-wheel race car, developed and built by British manufacturer Lola, and designed by Eric Broadley, in 1965. Its best race result and position was a 4th-place finish, at Trenton in 1965; being driven by American Bud Tingelstad. Its best result at the Indianapolis 500 was a 9th-place finish, with Al Unser driving at the 1965 race. It was powered by the Ford quad-cam DOHC Indy V8 engine, developing around 425 hp (317 kW) @ 8,000 rpm. It was used alongside, and eventually succeeded, by the T90.
