= Lotus 38 =

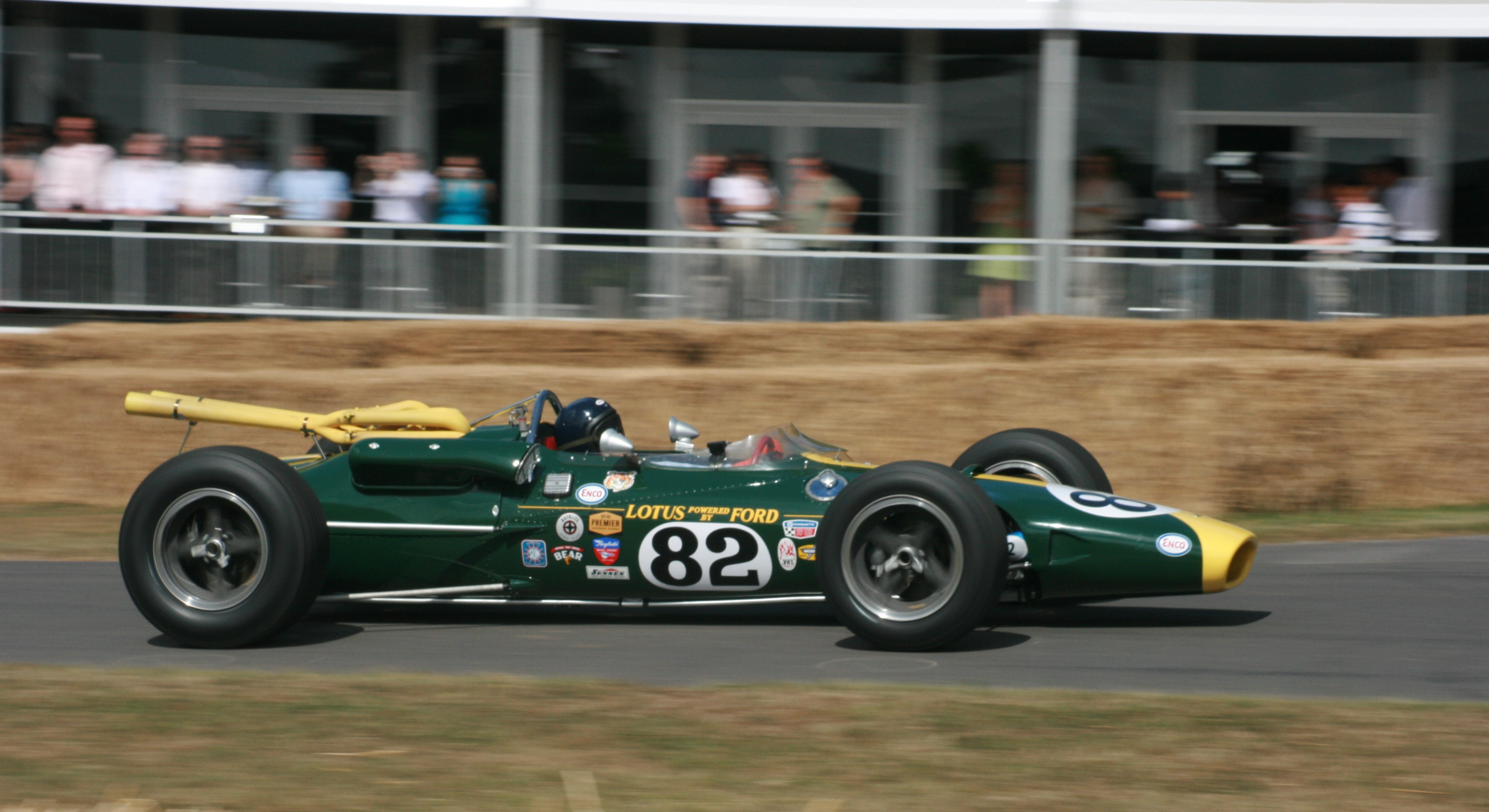
- 1965 Lotus 38 at the 2010 Goodwood Festival of Speed
- Category: USAC IndyCar
- Constructor: Team Lotus
- Designers: Colin Chapman; Len Terry
- Predecessor: Lotus 34
- Successor: Lotus 42

Technical specifications
- Chassis: Aluminium monocoque.
- Suspension (front): Double wishbones, inboard coil springs over dampers.
- Suspension (rear): Reverse lower wishbones, top link, twin radius rods, coil springs over dampers, anti-roll bar
- Length: 155.9 in (396 cm)
- Width: 73 in (185 cm)
- Height: 31 in (79 cm)
- Axle track: Front: 60 in (152 cm); Rear: 60 in (152 cm)
- Wheelbase: 95.9 in (244 cm)
- Engine: Ford 4,195 cc (256.0 cu in) DOHC 90° V8, naturally aspirated, mid-mounted.
- Transmission: ZF 2DS-20 2-speed manual gearbox.
- Power: 500 hp (370 kW)
- Weight: 612 kg (1,349 lb)

Competition history
- Notable entrants: Team Lotus
- Notable drivers: (United Kingdom) Jim Clark (United States) Bobby Johns (United States) Dan Gurney (United States) A. J. Foyt (United States) Mario Andretti
- Debut: 1965 Indianapolis 500
Wins
1 (1965 Indianapolis 500)

The Lotus 38 was the first rear-engined car to win the Indianapolis 500, in 1965, driven by Jim Clark. It was run by Lotus at Indianapolis from 1965 to 1967; a total of 8 were built, most for use by Lotus, but several were sold for use by other drivers, including A. J. Foyt and Mario Andretti.

== Design ==
The Lotus 38 was designed by Colin Chapman and Len Terry as Lotus' 1965 entry for the Indianapolis 500. It was an evolution of the previous Lotus 29 and Lotus 34 Indy designs, but this time with a full monocoque tub chassis; it was powered by the same four-cam Ford V8 fuel injected engine as used in the 34, giving out around 500 bhp. In all of them, the engine was mid-mounted, improving the weight distribution and giving it good handling. The 38 was significantly larger than Formula One cars of the time, but was dwarfed by the massive American roadsters.

The 38 was specially designed with an "offset" suspension, with the car body situated asymmetrically between the wheels, offset to the left using suspension arms of unequal length. Although in theory this was better suited for the ovals (which have only left turns), for example by evening out tyre wear between the two sides, in practice the handling was sufficiently idiosyncratic that the concept never caught on widely.

== Race results ==
Lotus 38 being demonstrated by Jackie Stewart in 2010

At the 1965 Indianapolis 500, Clark qualified second with a 4 lap average speed of 160.729 mph (258.668 km/h) with a new one lap record of 160.973 mph (259.061 km/h). Although Clark and A.J. Foyt had both broken the 160 mph barrier in practice earlier in the month, Clark was the first to do so in official qualifying. Ironically, Foyt grabbed the pole with an average of 161.233 mph (259.479 km/h) in a slightly modified Lotus 34 while also turning in a new one lap record of 161.958 mph (260.646 km/h).

Clark led from the start and although Foyt passed him on the second lap, the Lotus 38 roared past on lap 3 and from then on the only time Clark lost the lead was on lap 65 when he had his first pit stop. Foyt led until his stop on lap 74 and from then on Clark was never headed. The Scotsman led all but 10 laps and won with only four other cars on the lead lap, with the rest of the finishers all at least 2 laps behind. With Parnelli Jones finishing second (also in a modified 34), it was payback for Clark and Lotus losing the race in 1963 when many, including team owner/founder Colin Chapman and journalist/author Brock Yates, felt that Jones' oil spewing front engined roadster should have been black flagged.

Lotus returned with the 38 in 1966, though they conceded victory to Graham Hill in a Lola, after some confusion with the scoring due to an erroneous lap chart, and again in 1967 when Clark retired early with a blown engine.

After a fair amount of resistance from American teams who generally believed that rear-engine cars were for "drivers who like to be pushed around", the Lotus 38 had proved that mid-engined cars could make the grade at The Brickyard, and the days of the front-engined roadsters were effectively over (in fact, only 4 of the 33 starters in 1965 were front engine cars). Clark won the 1965 Indianapolis 500 with a then race record average speed of 150.686 mph (242.506 km/h), the first time the Indianapolis 500 had been run at a speed of over 150 mph. The previous record had been set by Foyt in 1964 at an average of 147.350 mph (237.137 km/h). Foyt's win in 1964 in a front engine Watson-Offy roadster was the last time a front engined car would win the Indy 500.

Design elements in the 38 were eventually worked into the design of the legendary Lotus 49, and Foyt's early Coyotes (as well as a number of other contemporary Indy cars) were Lotus 38 clones.
