= Lotus 56 =

Lotus 56 Lotus 56B
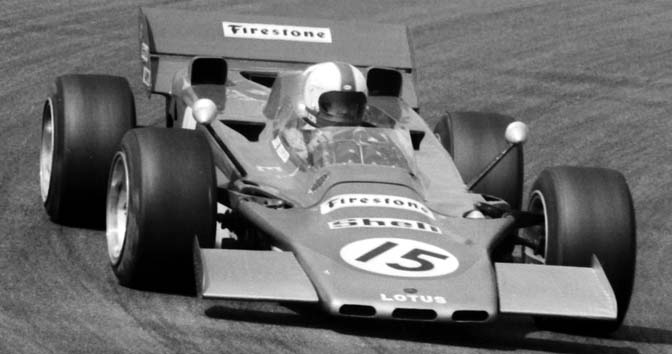
- Dave Walker in the 56B at Zandvoort
- Category: Formula One; USAC IndyCar
- Constructor: (United Kingdom) Team Lotus
- Designers: Colin Chapman (Technical Director); Maurice Philippe (Chief Designer)
- Predecessor: 72 (F1); 42 (USAC IndyCar)
- Successor: 72 (F1); 64 (USAC IndyCar)

Technical specifications
- Chassis: Aluminium monocoque
- Suspension (front): Double wishbones, inboard coil springs over dampers
- Suspension (rear): Double wishbones, inboard coil springs over dampers
- Engine: Pratt & Whitney STN76 gas turbine mid-mounted
- Transmission: Manual single-speed direct-drive planetary gear set Four-wheel drive
- Power: 500–600 hp (373–447 kW)
- Weight: 612kg (USAC IndyCar); 600kg (F1)
- Fuel: STP (USAC IndyCar); Shell (F1)
- Tyres: Firestone

Competition history
- Notable entrants: Gold Leaf Team Lotus (F1); World Wide Racing (F1)
- Notable drivers: (Australia) Dave Walker (F1) (Sweden) Reine Wisell (F1) (Brazil) Emerson Fittipaldi (F1)
- Debut: 1968 Indianapolis 500 (USAC IndyCar); 1971 Dutch Grand Prix (F1)
Races	Wins	Poles	F/Laps
3	0	0	0
- Unless otherwise stated, all data refer to Formula One World Championship Grands Prix only.

The Lotus 56 was a gas turbine-powered four-wheel-driven racing car, designed by Maurice Philippe as Team Lotus's STP-backed entry in the 1968 Indianapolis 500. All three cars entered and retired from the race with Joe Leonard's car expiring while leading just eight laps from the finish.

A variant designated the Lotus 56B was entered in three races in the 1971 Formula One season but with little success.

The 4WD concept was also used in the 1969 Lotus 63 F1 car, and the wedge shape became a prominent feature of the world-championship-winning Lotus 72.

== Indianapolis 500 ==
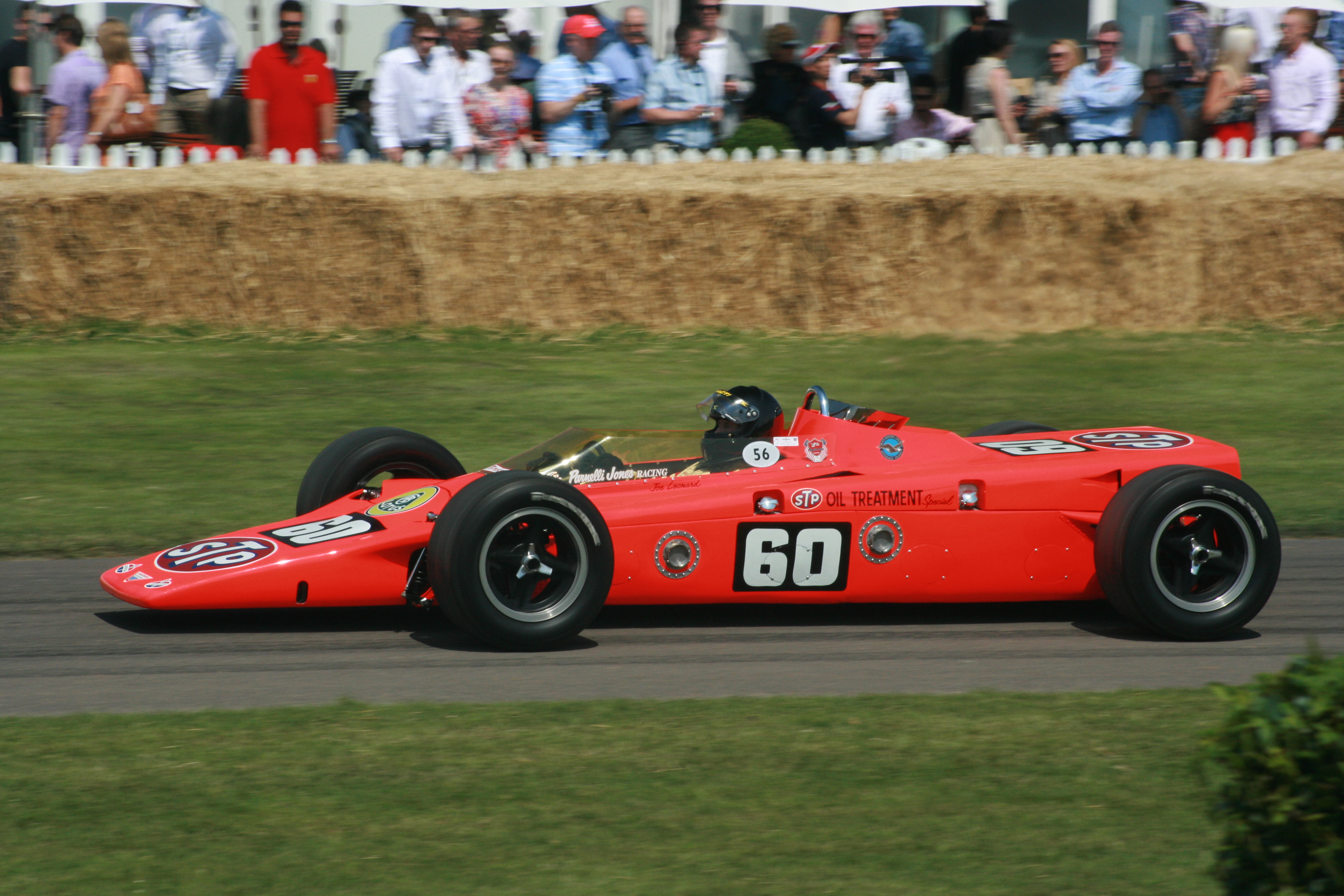
Joe Leonard's Lotus 56 at the 2011 Goodwood Festival of Speed.

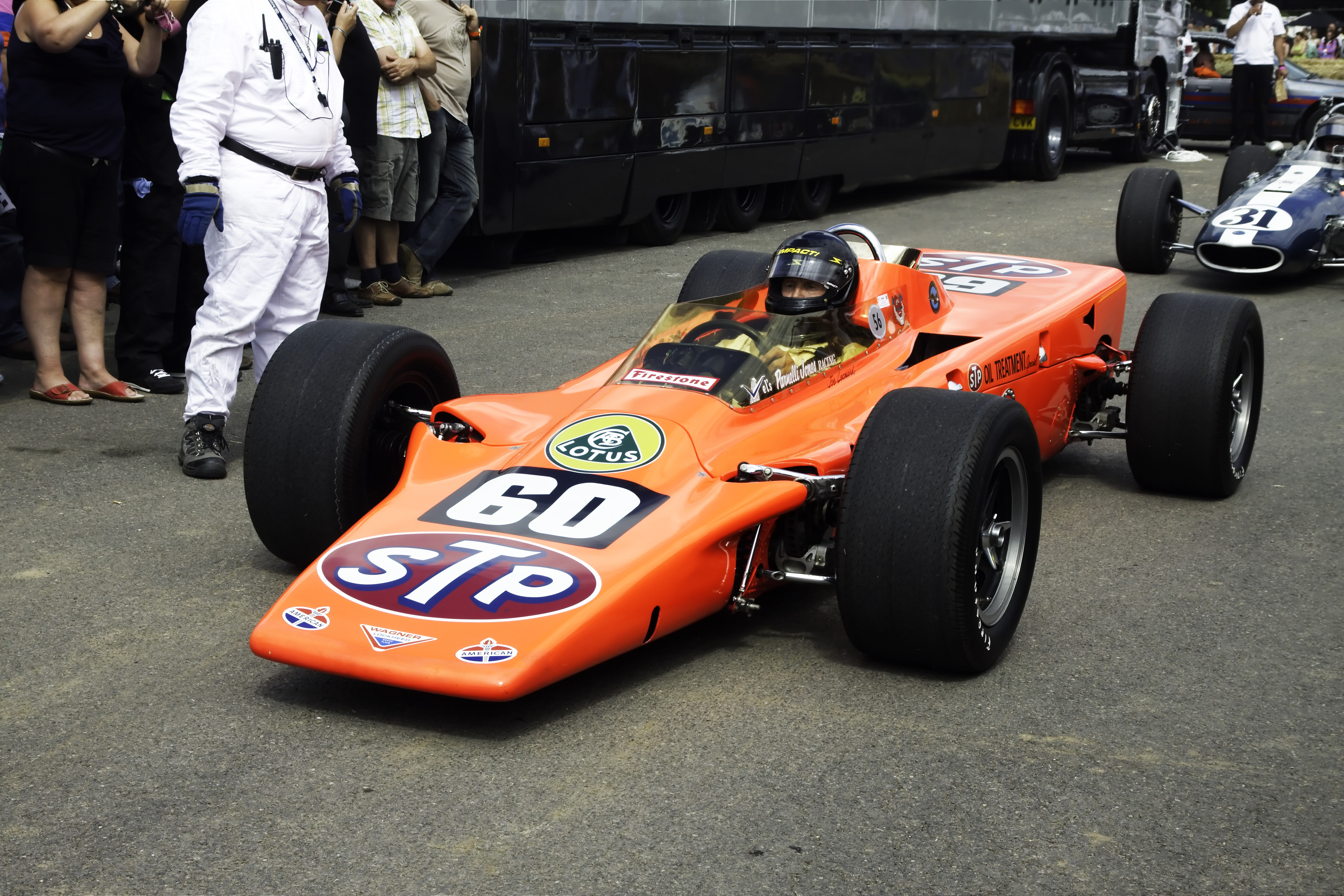
Lotus 56 between runs at the 2011 Goodwood Festival of Speed, with original owner Parnelli Jones driving.

The Lotus 56 used a modified version of the ST6 gas turbine used on the STP-Paxton Turbocar ("Silent Sam") that almost won in 1967. But the car itself was an entirely new and more advanced design which introduced a distinctive aerodynamic wedge-shaped body rather than a cigar-shape. USAC, the governing body of the Indy 500, had implemented new rules aimed at handicapping turbine powered racing cars by drastically reducing the air intake size. The Lotus 56 made up for reduced power with a sophisticated suspension design, retaining the four-wheel drive concept of the Silent Sam, but with lighter weight, and advanced aerodynamics.

Development of the 56 took place during a difficult time for Team Lotus. Team leader Jim Clark, who had briefly tested the car, was killed in a Formula 2 race in Germany. His replacement and former teammate, Mike Spence, was killed at Indianapolis while testing the car. Three cars were entered for the race, to be driven by Graham Hill, Joe Leonard, and Art Pollard, with Leonard claiming pole position. Unlike the year before, when the STP-Paxton Turbocar easily outperformed the other cars in the race, in the race the turbine cars were relatively evenly matched with the other top contenders, much of which must be attributed to aerodynamics and chassis design and not to the turbine engine. Hill's car lost a wheel, Pollard's car suffered a fuel pump drive shaft failure, while Leonard was leading with just a handful of laps to go when his fuel pump shaft also failed. Shortly thereafter, the USAC imposed additional restrictions on turbine cars that essentially removed them from competition. For the second year in a row STP turbine cars had brought innovation to the Indy 500 and had failed to win while leading within a few laps of the end of the race. USAC subsequently banned turbine cars and four-wheel drive completely, but it was unusual enough that Mattel produced a model of the "Lotus Turbine" as one of the popular mass-produced die cast Hot Wheels cars.

In 1969, Art Pollard brought an Offenhauser-powered Lotus 56 to Indy. He qualified on the fourth row but retired with mechanical failure after only 6 laps.

== Formula One ==
Colin Chapman had developed the 56 as a potential F1 contender, part of his plan to have a single design to compete at both the Indy 500 and in Formula 1. The F1 car had wings front and rear and additional fuel tanks. Designated as the 56B, Emerson Fittipaldi first drove it in the non-championship 1971 Race of Champions at Brands Hatch. During wet practice the 56B was far and away the fastest car on the track, but the race was held in dry weather and the car was lost in midfield. At the International Trophy at Silverstone the car only lasted three laps of the first heat before suspension failure forced Fittipaldi's retirement. Dave Walker then ran the car in the Dutch Grand Prix, and had progressed from 22nd to 10th in five laps of the very wet track, before sliding off the road and into retirement. Fittipaldi used the car again in that year's 1971 Italian Grand Prix and managed to bring the fragile design home 8th.

== Legacy ==
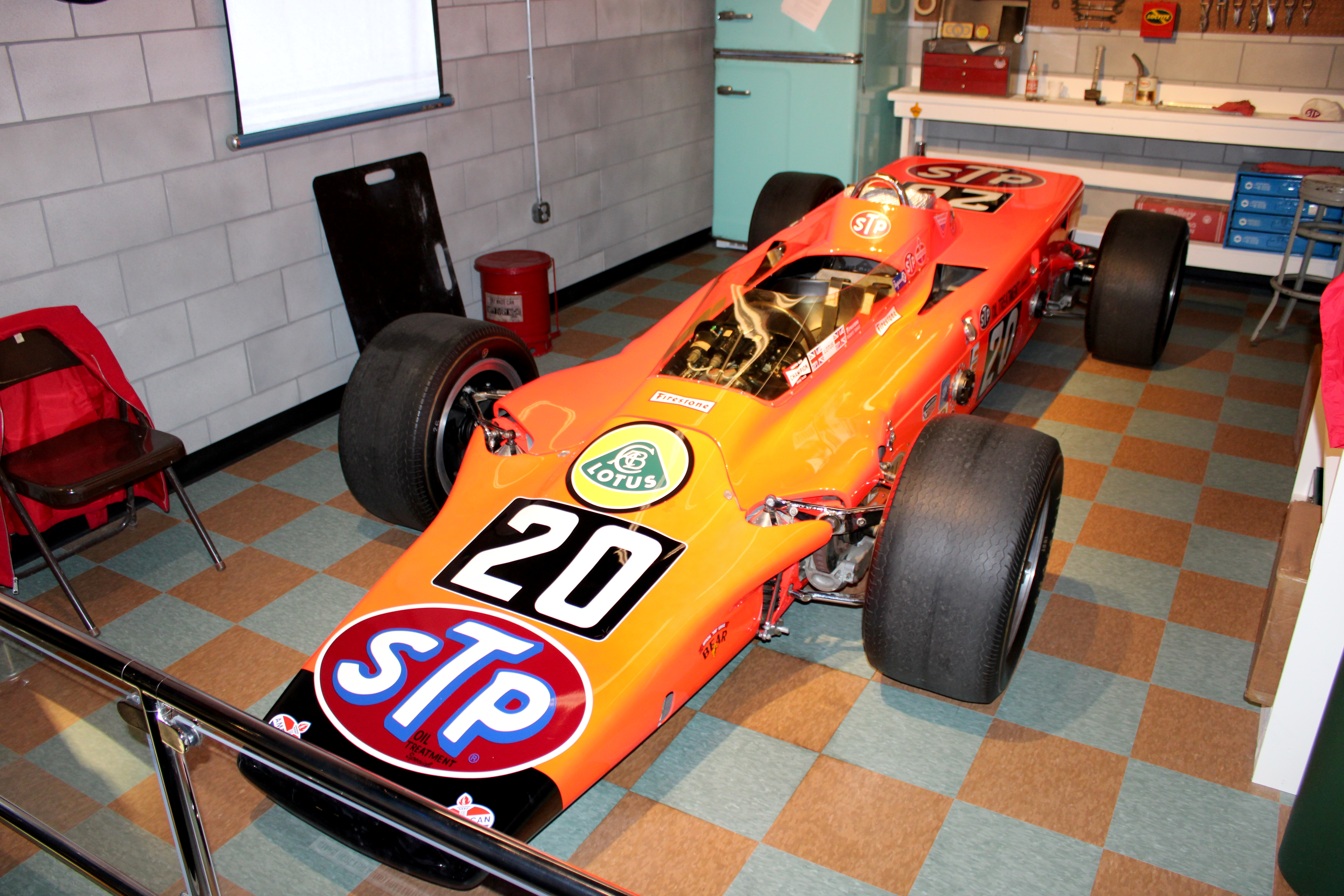
Art Pollard's 1968 STP Oil Treatment Lotus 56 on display at the Indianapolis Motor Speedway Museum

The Lotus 56, while never winning a race, demonstrated the importance of aerodynamics in racing cars, along with Jim Hall's Chaparrals, and effectively set the mould for open-wheeled racing cars for the next ten years. Chapman's Lotus 72 employed the same wedge nose shape and went on to win three world championships in Formula 1.

== Formula One World Championship results ==
(key)

Year	Entrant	Engine	Tyres	Driver	1	2	3	4	5	6	7	8	9	10	11	WCC	Pts.
1971	Gold Leaf Team Lotus	Pratt & Whitney; ST6 gas turbine	F		RSA	ESP	MON	NED	FRA	GBR	GER	AUT	ITA	CAN	USA	0	NC
1971	Gold Leaf Team Lotus	Pratt & Whitney; ST6 gas turbine	F	Dave Walker				Ret								0	NC
1971	Gold Leaf Team Lotus	Pratt & Whitney; ST6 gas turbine	F	Reine Wisell						NC						0	NC
1971	World Wide Racing	Pratt & Whitney; ST6 gas turbine	F	Emerson Fittipaldi									8			0	NC

== Formula One non-championship results ==
(key) (Races in bold indicate pole position) (Races in italics indicate fastest lap)

Year	Entrant	Tyres	Driver	1	2	3	4	5	6	7	8
1971	Gold Leaf Team Lotus	**F**		ARG	ROC	QUE	SPR	INT	RIN	OUL	VIC
1971	Gold Leaf Team Lotus	**F**	Emerson Fittipaldi		Ret			Ret			
1971	Gold Leaf Team Lotus	**F**	Reine Wisell				Ret				
1971	Gold Leaf Team Lotus	**F**	Dave Walker						PO		

== See also ==
- Gas turbine
