= Len Terry =

British engineer and car designer (1924–2014)

- Born: February 11, 1924; Hackney, Greater London, UK
- Died: August 25, 2014 (aged 90)
- Occupations: Motorsport engineer and designer
- Years active: 1955–1993
- Known for: Formula One designer. (Lotus, BRM, Eagle)
- Notable work: Lotus 38, Eagle Mk1, Lotus 33

Leonard E. Terry (11 February 1924 – 25 August 2014) was an English racing car designer and engineer, known for his work with Lotus, BRM and Eagle. He also designed chassis for many other teams, including ERA and Aston Martin and produced his own car in which he competed.

== Biography ==
Terry left school at 14, with few qualifications, but with ambitions to become a designer and worked for a theatrical agency as an office-boy. Quickly promoted, after his colleagues were called up for military service, he produced promotional material for his company's clients. In 1943, Terry enlisted in the RAF where he served as an instrument maker.

After completing military service, Terry trained as a draughtsman and this led to him being employed by a contract design company who seconded him to Aston Martin, where he worked on the DB2/4. In 1955, he began to race a one-off special, the JVT and subsequently designed his own car, which he named the Terrier. He worked briefly for ERA before joining Lotus in 1958, where he worked on revisions to the 7, 11, 12, 15, 16, 17 and Elite models. His Terrier sports car was not successful, but he teamed up with future Formula One engine builder, Brian Hart for the MkII version. In 1959, Hart won 18 races, out of 21 entered, regularly beating the Lotus entries and creating a demand for customer cars. This led to Terry being sacked by Lotus. At this time, Terry also supplied drawings for the Moorland Special which was purchased by the Gemini team and formed the basis of their Mk1 Formula Junior car.

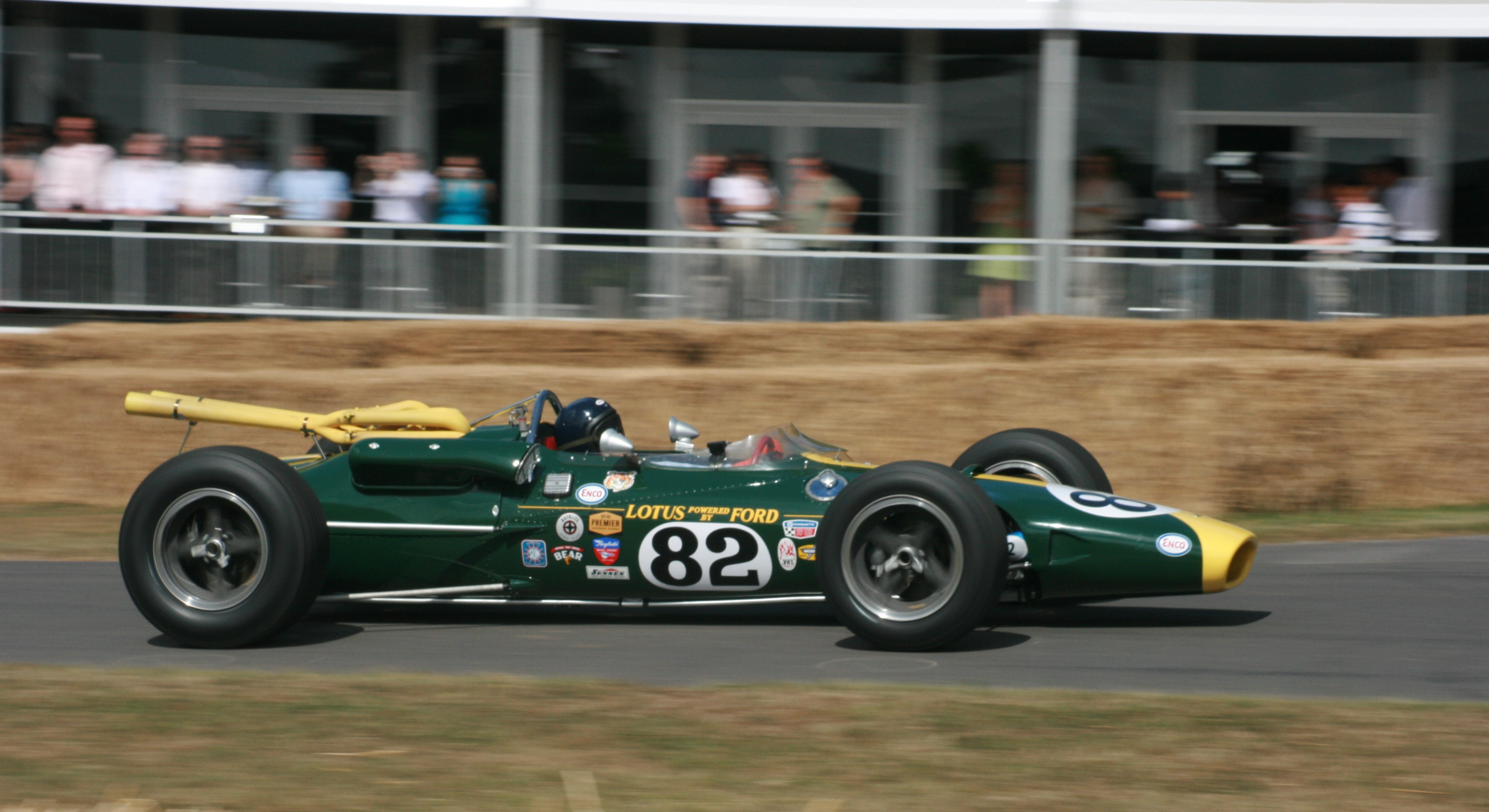
Lotus 38 at Goodwood 2010

Terry was then asked to design chassis for Gilby, initially for sportscar racing but subsequently for Formula One. Even though the car was tested by Bruce McLaren it was not raced by a top-line driver and the project ended when Gilby was taken over by a firm which was not involved in motorsport. At this point Terry's own part-time racing career came to an end after an accident.

He was working on a freelance basis (including for Lotus) when Colin Chapman asked him to return full-time to design a car to compete in the Indianapolis 500. He produced the rear-engined Lotus 29 which, driven by Jim Clark, finished a close second at the 1963 Indianapolis 500 and the Lotus 34 for 1964 which, although starting from pole-position only completed 47 laps (out of 200) due to tyre and suspension problems. Terry later claimed that differences with Chapman meant the car had not been fully developed. He was also involved in the design of the Lotus 33 F1 car with which Clark won the 1965 Drivers' World Championship.

For the 1965 Indianapolis 500, Terry was given full control over the design of the Lotus 38, and the car finished first that year, and second in 1966, each time with Clark driving. However, Terry left Lotus before the 1965 race, having already been recruited by Dan Gurney's AAR team to design a Formula One car. This led to the Eagle-Weslake V12, which has been considered one of the most aesthetic Formula One designs.

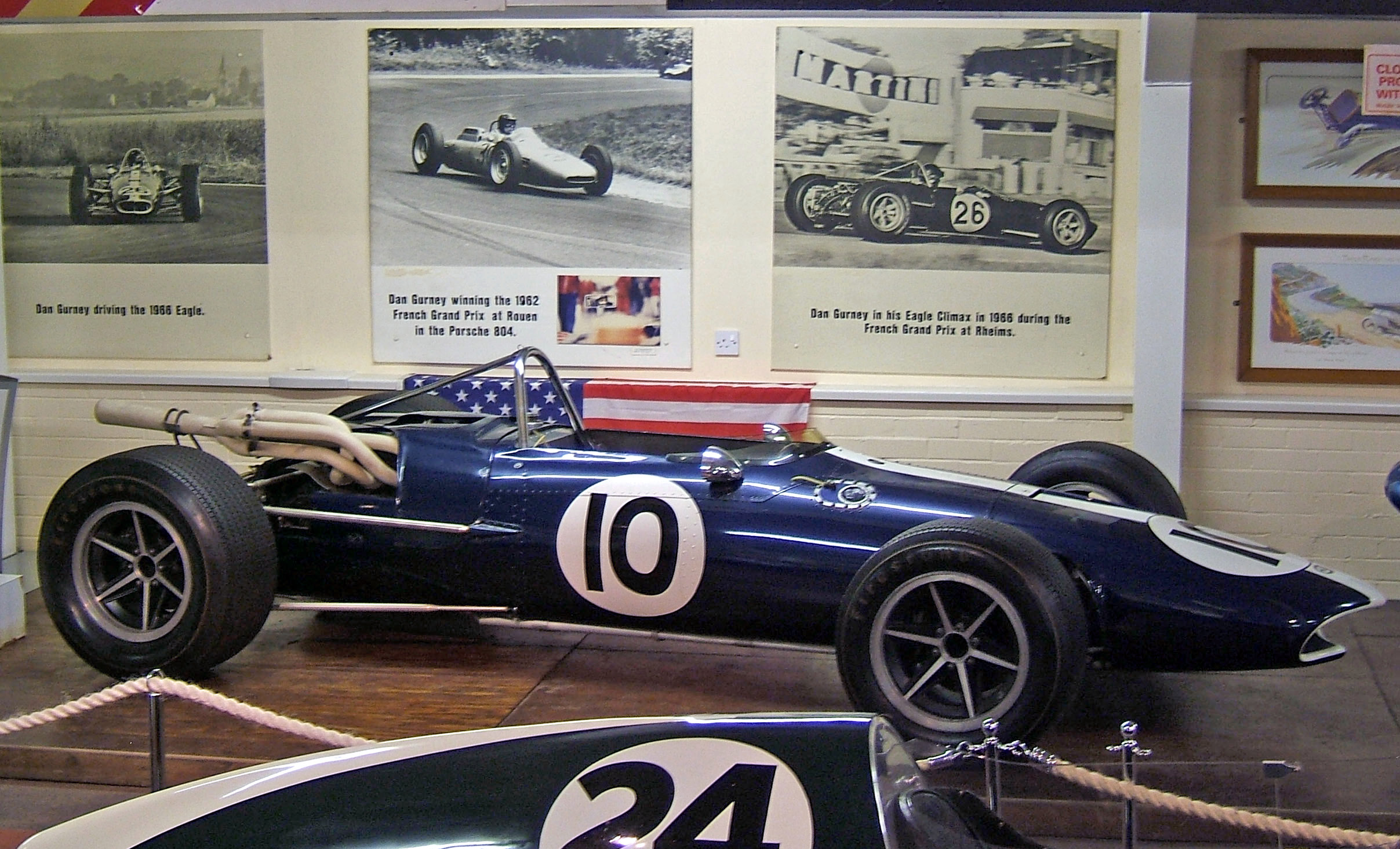
An early version of the Eagle Mk1, with Climax four-cylinder engine

Terry was employed by Carroll Shelby to design a Can-Am car for 1967, but the project did not come to fruition: Terry was still based in the UK and could not oversee the development. Subsequently, he was recruited by BRM to design a Tasman Series car which became the 1968 BRM P126. Terry's next project was the BRM-engined Mirage M2 for John Wyer. It proved effective but its racing career was delayed by the continued success of Wyer's Ford GT40s. Len Terry was commissioned to design and build a lightweight full spaceframe Ford Escort Mk1 Special Saloon for Geoff Wood, this was chassis number 40. His partner Cyril Malem of CTG F1 Racing built this race car in 1973, powered by a Brian Hart all alloy BDA engine with Lucas fuel injection, helping the car to weighing just 508 kilos and 42in high. It was entered in the 1974 British Special Saloon Car Championship and later in the Tricentrol Super Saloon Car Championship. Using F1 F5000 technology and components, it was named the LT40 Hart Escort, nicknamed 'The Lowline'. After several years it eventually became very successful in the hands of Phil Winter and with Andrew Grover in 1978/1979, winning races and setting new lap records. This rare car had remained lost since 1979, until found complete and original in a barn belonging to Andrew Grover in 2017. The LT40 Hart Escort is now being fully re-commissioned to its 1974 spec.

Terry's next design was a Formula 5000 car; intended as a privateer project it was taken up by Surtees and used by David Hobbs to finish second in the 1969 US Championship. This chassis also formed the basis of the BMW 269 and BMW 270 Formula Two cars in 1969–70. There followed another F5000 design, (named Leda) which was not successful, and the company formed to produce it passed into the hands of Graham McRae.

Terry worked as a freelance designer on several projects, none of which were particularly successful before BRM asked him to design a Formula One chassis to accept their V12 engine. The result was the BRM P207 which competed in the World Championship in 1977 without scoring any points. This was Terry's last involvement with F1 design. He subsequently worked on several projects, within the industry, though away from motorsport, but did design the Viking Formula Three car.

== Personal life ==
Terry had a mild stroke in 1993 and was largely retired thereafter. He was a keen cyclist and table tennis player and continued to assist Classic Team Lotus with restoration matters.

Terry was married to Iris who died in 2008. He died in August 2014 aged 90, after a short illness.
