= Lotus 34 =

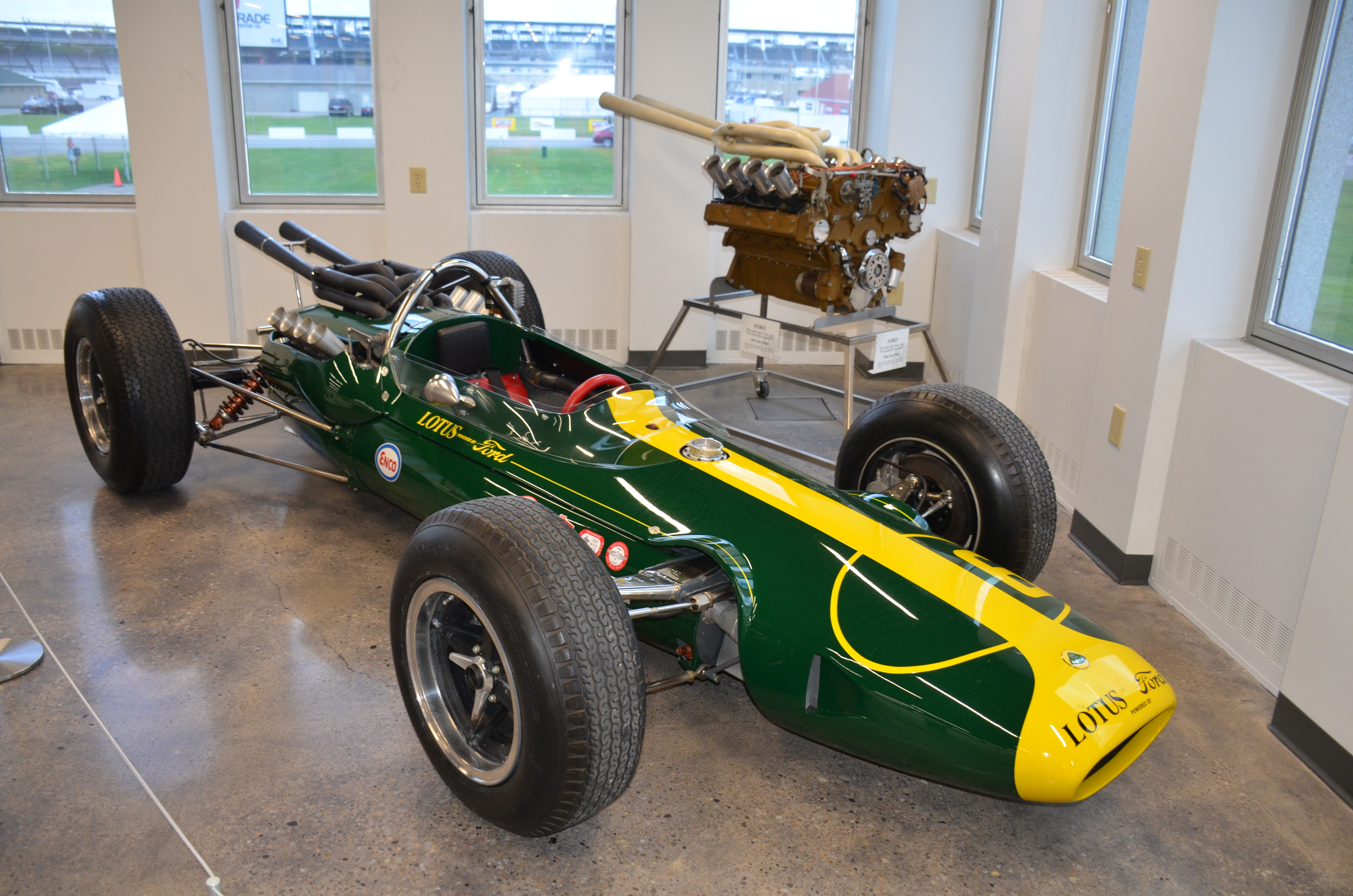
- Category: USAC IndyCar
- Designer(s): Colin Chapman; Len Terry
- Predecessor: Lotus 29
- Successor: Lotus 38

Technical specifications
- Chassis: aluminum monocoque
- Suspension (front): lower wishbones, top rockers, in-board coil springs over dampers, anti-roll bar
- Suspension (rear): reversed lower wishbones, single top links, twin radius arms, coil springs over shock absorbers, anti-roll bar
- Length: 3,810 mm (150 in)
- Width: 1,651 mm (65 in)
- Height: 787 mm (31 in)
- Axle track: Front: 1,422 mm (56 in); Rear: 1,422 mm (56 in)
- Wheelbase: 2,438 mm (96 in)
- Engine: Ford 4,195 cc (256.0 cu in) OHV 90° V8, naturally aspirated, mid-engine longitudinal
- Transmission: ZF 2DS-20 2-speed manual gearbox.
- Power: 425 bhp (317 kW)
- Weight: 543 kg (1,197 lb)
- Tyres: Dunlop

Competition history
- Notable entrants: Team Lotus
- Notable drivers: (United Kingdom) Jim Clark (United States) Dan Gurney (United States) A. J. Foyt (United States) Parnelli Jones
- Debut: 1964 Indianapolis 500
Wins	Poles
4	2

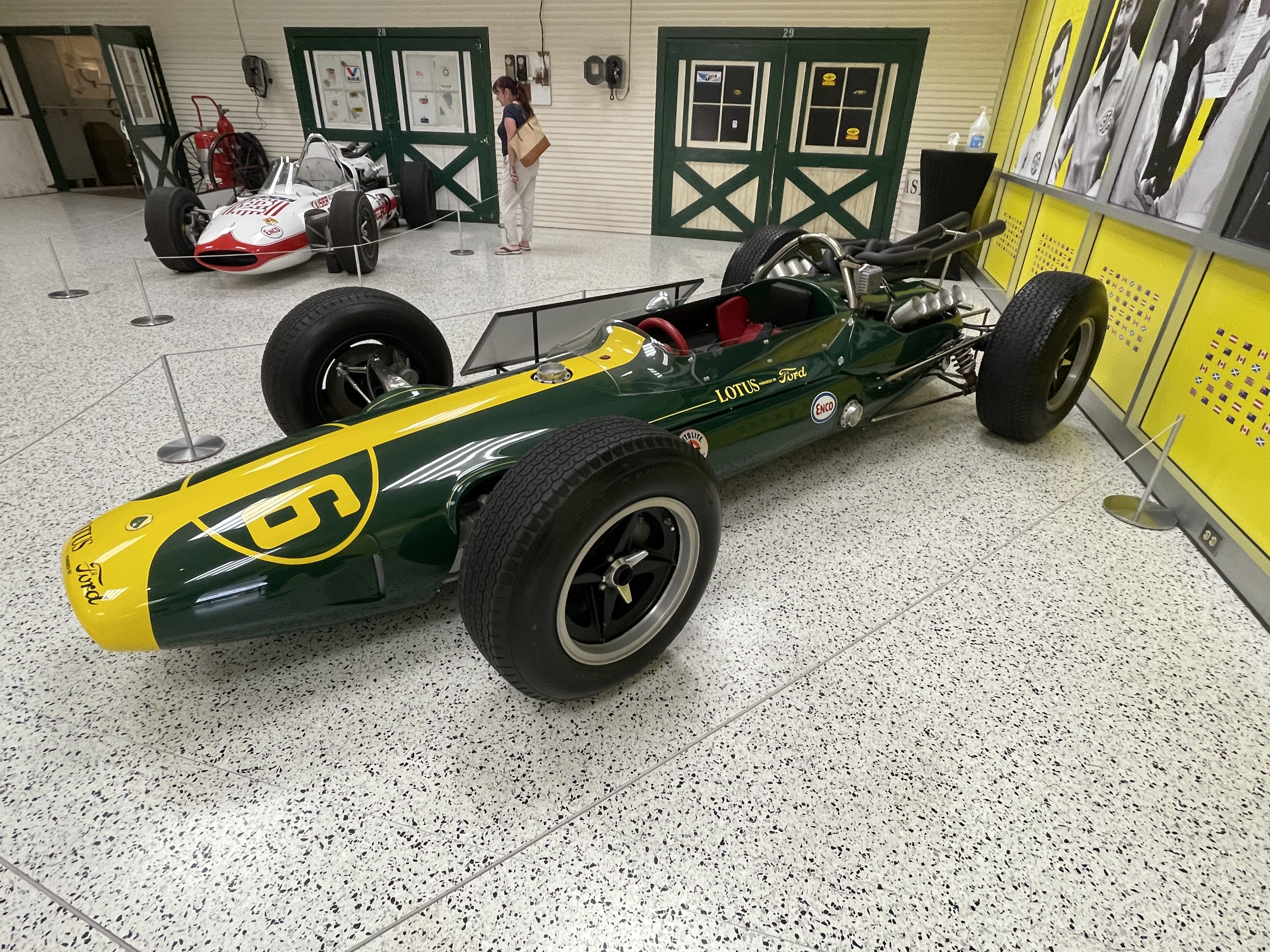
Lotus 34 at the Indianapolis Motor Speedway Museum in 2022.

The Lotus 34 is an open-wheel race car built by Team Lotus for the 1964 Indianapolis 500. Driven by Jim Clark, who qualified on pole, and Dan Gurney, tyre failure led to Clark retiring and Gurney being withdrawn.

== Development history ==
The Lotus 34 was a very similar car to the 29. It differed principally in featuring a four-cam 4195 cc (255ci) DOHC Ford V8 with Hilborn fuel injection, producing 425 bhp (317 kW), through a ZF 2DS20 gearbox.

== Race history ==
At Indianapolis, Jim Clark qualified on pole, with Dan Gurney qualifying sixth. The Dunlop tyres failed during the race, leading to Clark crashing and Dan Gurney being withdrawn, much to Ford's displeasure. Later that year Parnelli Jones won twice in a Lotus 43 at Milwaukee and Trenton.

In 1965 A.J. Foyt won three USAC races in a Lotus 34 on his way to second in that years championship, while Parnelli Jones finished second at Indianapolis behind Jim Clark's Lotus 38.
