= Lotus 29 =

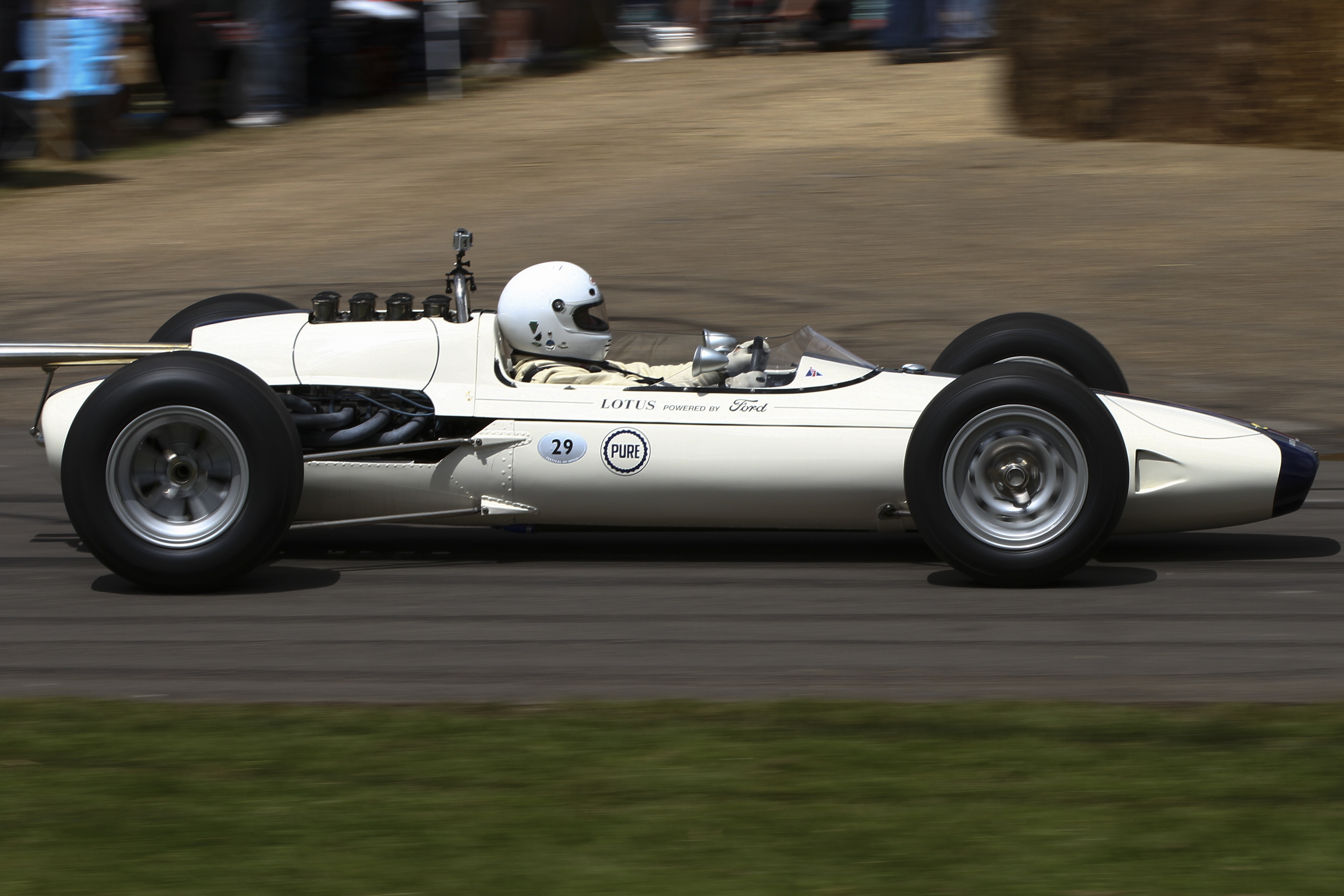
- Category: USAC IndyCar
- Constructor: Team Lotus
- Designer(s): Colin Chapman; Len Terry
- Successor: Lotus 34

Technical specifications
- Chassis: Aluminium monocoque.
- Suspension (front): Upper cantilever rocker arms, inboard coil springs over dampers, lower wishbones.
- Suspension (rear): Reverse lower wishbones, top link, twin radius arms, coil springs over dampers, anti-roll bar
- Length: 150 in (381 cm)
- Width: 65 in (165 cm)
- Height: 30.5 in (77 cm)
- Axle track: Front: 56 in (142 cm); Rear: 56 in (142 cm)
- Wheelbase: 96 in (244 cm)
- Engine: Ford 4,195 cc (256.0 cu in) OHV 90° V8, naturally aspirated, mid-mounted.
- Transmission: Colotti T.37A 2-speed manual gearbox.
- Weight: 1,130 lb (513 kg)
- Fuel: petrol
- Tyres: Firestone (Indianapolis); Dunlop (ovals)

Competition history
- Notable entrants: Team Lotus
- Notable drivers: (United Kingdom) Jim Clark (United States) Dan Gurney (United States) Bobby Marshman (United States) Al Miller
- Debut: 1963 Indianapolis 500
Races	Wins	Poles
7	1	2

The Lotus 29 was a British racing car built by Team Lotus for the 1963 Indianapolis 500. It was their first attempt at the event and the two cars which were entered finished second and seventh in the hands of Jim Clark and Dan Gurney. Although they were not the first rear-engined cars built for the category, they were first to prove that the configuration was definitely a potential race-winner, and that the days of the big and heavy front-engined roadsters were numbered.

== Design concept ==
Dan Gurney had tested Mickey Thompson's rear-engined Indy Car for the 1962 Indianapolis 500 and, convinced that the layout was a potential race-winner, approached Colin Chapman of Lotus with the idea of building a similar car for the 1963 Indianapolis 500. Chapman attended the 1962 race and Gurney then arranged a meeting with Ford to source a suitable engine. Later that year, Chapman had Jim Clark and Lotus mechanics Jim Endruweit and Dick Scammell sent to Indianapolis after the 1962 United States Grand Prix to do some testing with the race-winning Lotus 25. Results proved positive, and construction was started on a new car, the type 29. Based on the 25, it was a very similar car which differed principally in featuring a 4195 cc (255ci) Ford V8 with Weber carburettors producing 376 bhp (280 kW) through a Colotti T.37 gearbox. It was slightly larger all round than the 25 and was fitted with offset suspension and Dunlop (front) and Halibrand (rear) knock-off wheels to facilitate rapid pit stops. Three cars were built in all; the first being essentially a development prototype, after which two cars were built for Clark and Gurney.

== Race history ==
At Indianapolis, Clark qualified 7th fastest, with Gurney 17th after an accident in qualifying; he wrote off his car and the prototype was hurriedly pressed into service with parts scavenged from the wreck. Clark started from 5th place on the grid and Gurney 12th. The lighter Lotuses needed fewer pit stops than the heavy roadsters and at one point were running first and second. Eventually, Clark finished second behind Parnelli Jones and Gurney finished seventh.

The Lotus 29s' next outing was later that year at the Tony Bettenhausen 200 at the Milwaukee Mile. Clark and Gurney qualified first and second, and Clark led from start to finish, lapping everyone but second placed A. J. Foyt, with Gurney coming in third. Their final race in 1963 was at the Trenton 200 where they again qualified first and second. Clark led for the first 49 laps until an oil line failed. Gurney then led until lap 146 until he retired with the same problem, leaving A. J. Foyt to run home as the winner.

For the 1964 Indianapolis 500 Team Lotus had a new car, the type 34, but one of the 29s was entered for Bobby Marshman to drive. He qualified second behind Clark and led the race for 33 laps before running off the track and damaging an oil plug. Later that year his engine failed at the Tony Bettenhausen 200, and then he crashed while testing at Phoenix International Raceway and succumbed to burns incurred in the accident.

At the 1965 Indianapolis 500 the 29 was still competitive enough for Al Miller to bring it home in fourth place, but in 1966 the first lap pile-up put paid to his race and the 29's last Champ Car race.
