= Jacques Coune =

Belgian coach builder and Co-founder of the Ecurie Nationale Belge F1 team

Jacques Coune (1924-2012) was a Belgian coach builder who designed and built a variety of specials via his company Carrosserie Jacques Coune, and was a co-founder of the Ecurie Nationale Belge F1 team.

== Early and racing career ==
Coune was born in 1924 to a motoring family. During the Second World War, Coune served as an army officer.

In the early 1950s Coune, along with his father, ran a business which supplied car spare parts and assembled passenger cars from the French brand Panhard for the Belgian market on behalf of Paul Sterckx S.A.

In the mid-1950s he opened a car workshop on Avenue de la Couronne in Brussels. In addition to standard production vehicles, he also looked after exclusive sports cars from Jaguar, Aston Martin and other high-priced brands as well as becoming the first Abarth dealer outside of Italy.

During 1956 Coune raced for the Ecurie Francorchamps team driving a Ferrari 166 MM. Coune would eventually take care of the maintenance of the team's sports cars, especially the Ferrari 250 GT Berlinetta "Tour de France".

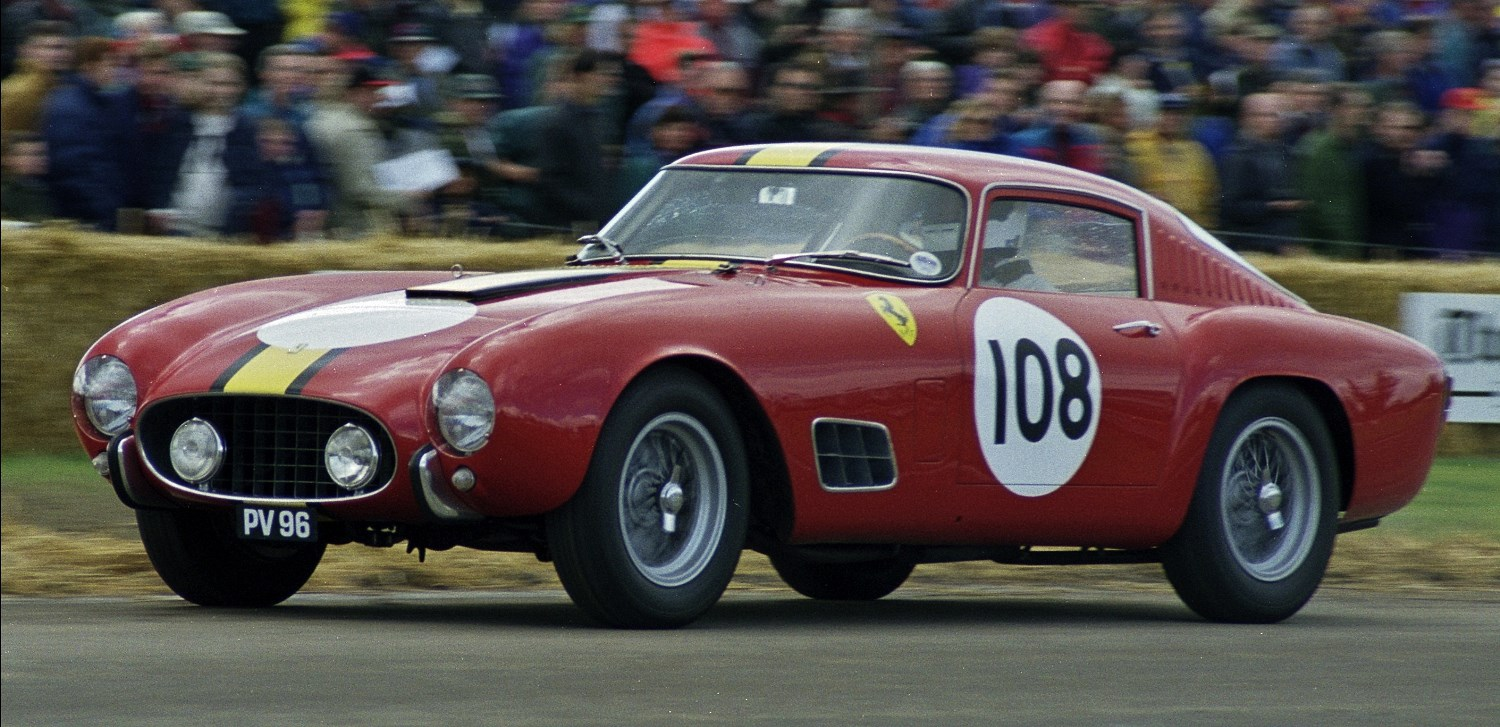
250 GT TdF "14 louvre" #0677GT, in Ecurie Francorchamps colours, at the 1997 Goodwood Festival of Speed.

Coune was one of the co-founders of the motor sports teams Equipe Nationale Belge. For the 1962 Formula 1 Championship, Coune designed the team's unsuccessful F1 car based on an Emeryson chassis and running a Maserati engine, which was driven by Lucien Bianchi.

In the 1960s Coune expanded his dealership by becoming the official dealer for Iso Rivolta.

== Carrosserie Jacques Coune ==
In 1962, Coune opened Carrosserie Jacques Coune, a specialist coach builder. The company designed and developed coach built specials based on existing models of other manufacturers. Between 1963 and 1965, Carrosserie Jacques Coune had a stand at the Belgium Motor Show.

In 1962 the company developed an estate based on the Peugeot 404 but it remained a one off due to Peugeot launching their own Break model.

In January 1963, Coune presented a convertible based on a two-door Volvo 122S. The price was high and they produced only four cars for paying customers. Furthermore, a two-seater Coune Volvo 122S Amazon Roadster was created at the special request of an American friend. Also in 1963, Coune showed an estate based on the Mercedes-Benz W110. The car remained a one off and was sold to a customer in the United States.

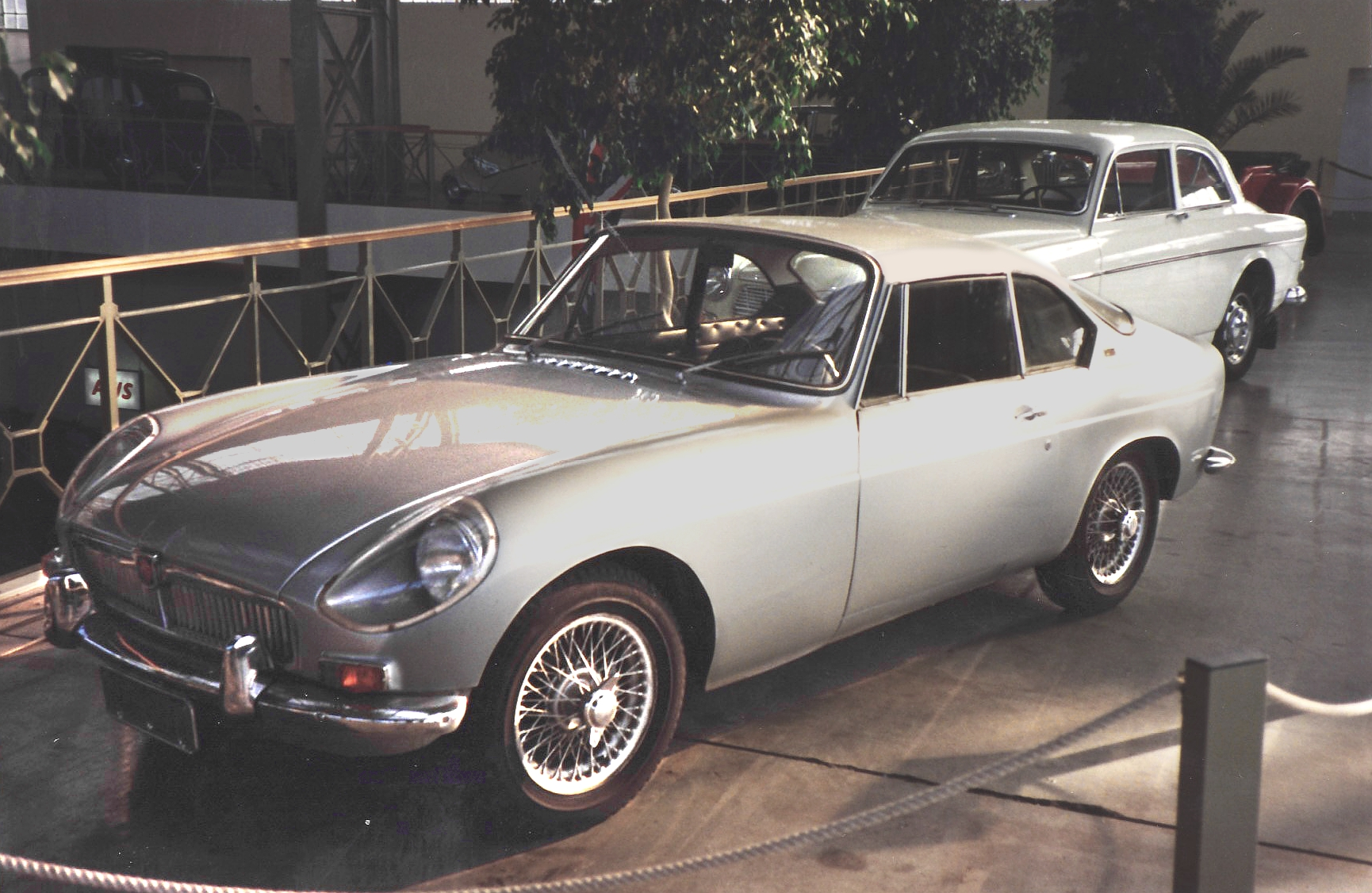
A Coune MGB Berlinette from 1964; characteristic are the fixed roof and the modified front with recessed, wired headlights

In 1964, Coune's most famous work was shown at the Belgium Motor Show. The MG MGB Berlinetta was based on the BMC roadster, and was previewed before MG's own GT. Coune meet with Sir Alec Issigonis to even discuss the car before BMC developed the MGB GT with Pininfarina. A total of 56 cars were made.

During 1965, Coune unveiled 2 new models. An MG MGB hardtop based on the standard roadster with the front of the Coune MGB Berlinetta sold a total of 120 cars. The other model was an estate based on the BMW 700 which was a one off.

In 1966, a new MGB based model was shown at the Belgian Motor Show. The Gemini was a targa one off special. The other model was an estate based on the BMW 1800, which according to different sources had 2 or 4 cars built.

The conversions of the Jacques Coune bodywork were considered to be technically outstanding, but they were also comparatively expensive. When the economic situation in Belgium worsened in the late 1960s, many of his skilled craftsmen returned to their homeland and the workshop closed in 1968.

== Later life ==
In the 1970s, he joined Charly de Pauw in a property company. In 1984 he joined de Pauw's Brussels Automobile Museum on the Rogierplein in Brussels as curator but retired after the museum closed upon de Pauw's death. Coune died in February 2012 at the age of 88.
