= Écurie Nationale Belge =

Auto racing team

(Belgium) ENB
- Full name: Écurie National Belge
- Base: Belgium
- Noted drivers: (Belgium) Lucien Bianchi

Formula One World Championship career
- First entry: 1955 Dutch Grand Prix
- Races entered: 8
- Constructors: Ferrari; Cooper-Climax; Lotus-Climax; Emeryson-Climax; Emeryson-Maserati; ENB-Maserati
- Race victories: 0
- Pole positions: 0
- Fastest laps: 0
- Final entry: 1962 German Grand Prix

ENB as a Formula One chassis constructor
Formula One World Championship career
- Entrants: Écurie National Belge
- First entry: 1962 German Grand Prix
- Last entry: 1962 German Grand Prix
- Races entered: 1
- Race victories: 0
- Pole positions: 0
- Fastest laps: 0

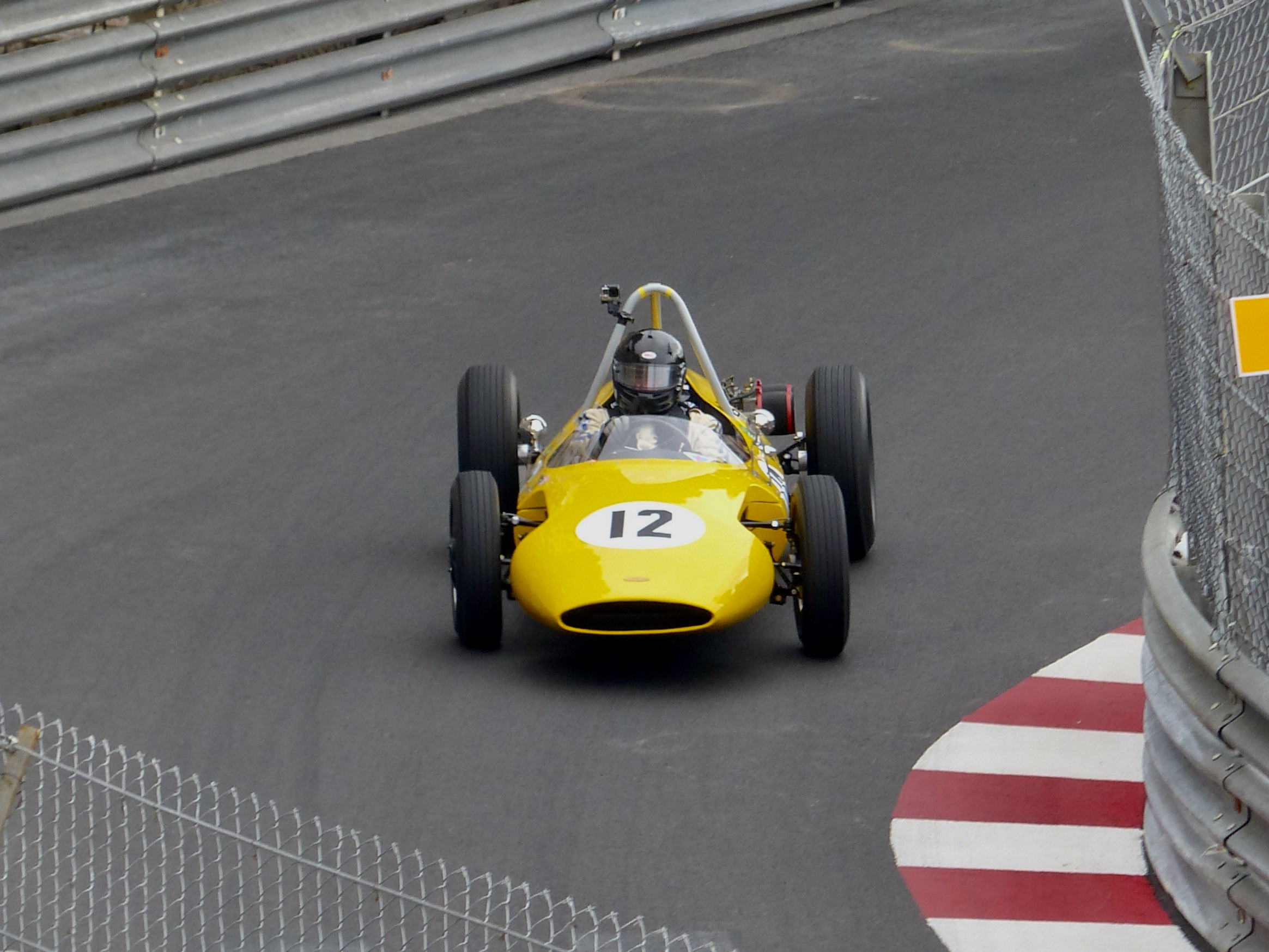
1961 Emeryson-Climax at the Monaco Historique 2018 in ENB colours, driven by Michael Kerry

Écurie Nationale Belge (the accurate name being Équipe Nationale Belge or ENB) was a Formula One and sportscar racing team in the 1950s and 1960s, which was formed through a merger of Jacques Swaters' Écurie Francorchamps and Johnny Claes' Écurie Belge. However, Écurie Francorchamps remained active independently, entering works and privately owned Ferraris.

== Formula One ==
In Formula One, the team used a variety of different chassis through the years: Ferrari, Cooper, Lotus, Emeryson as well as a car of their own construction, the ENB, which participated in a single World Championship Grand Prix, the 1962 German Grand Prix and was designed by one of the teams co-founder's Jacques Coune.

== Complete Formula One World Championship results ==
(key)

Year	Chassis	Engine	Driver	1	2	3	4	5	6	7	8	9	10
1955				ARG	MON	500	BEL	NED	GBR	ITA			
1955	Ferrari 500	Ferrari L4	Johnny Claes					11					
1959				MON	500	NED	FRA	GBR	GER	POR	ITA	USA	
1959	Cooper T51	Climax Straight-4	Alain de Changy	DNQ									
1959	Cooper T51	Climax Straight-4	Lucien Bianchi	DNQ									
1960				ARG	MON	500	NED	BEL	FRA	GBR	POR	ITA	USA
1960	Cooper T45	Climax Straight-4	Lucien Bianchi					6					
1961				MON	NED	BEL	FRA	GBR	GER	ITA	USA		
1961	Emeryson	Maserati Straight-4	Olivier Gendebien	DNQ									
1961	Emeryson	Maserati Straight-4	Lucien Bianchi	DNQ									
1961	Lotus 18	Climax Straight-4	Lucien Bianchi			Ret							
1961	Lotus 18	Climax Straight-4	Willy Mairesse			Ret							
1961	Emeryson	Climax Straight-4	André Pilette							DNQ			
1962				NED	MON	BEL	FRA	GBR	GER	ITA	USA	RSA	
1962	Lotus 18/21	Climax Straight-4	Lucien Bianchi			9							
1962	ENB	Maserati Straight-4	Lucien Bianchi						16				
