= MG MGB =

MGB
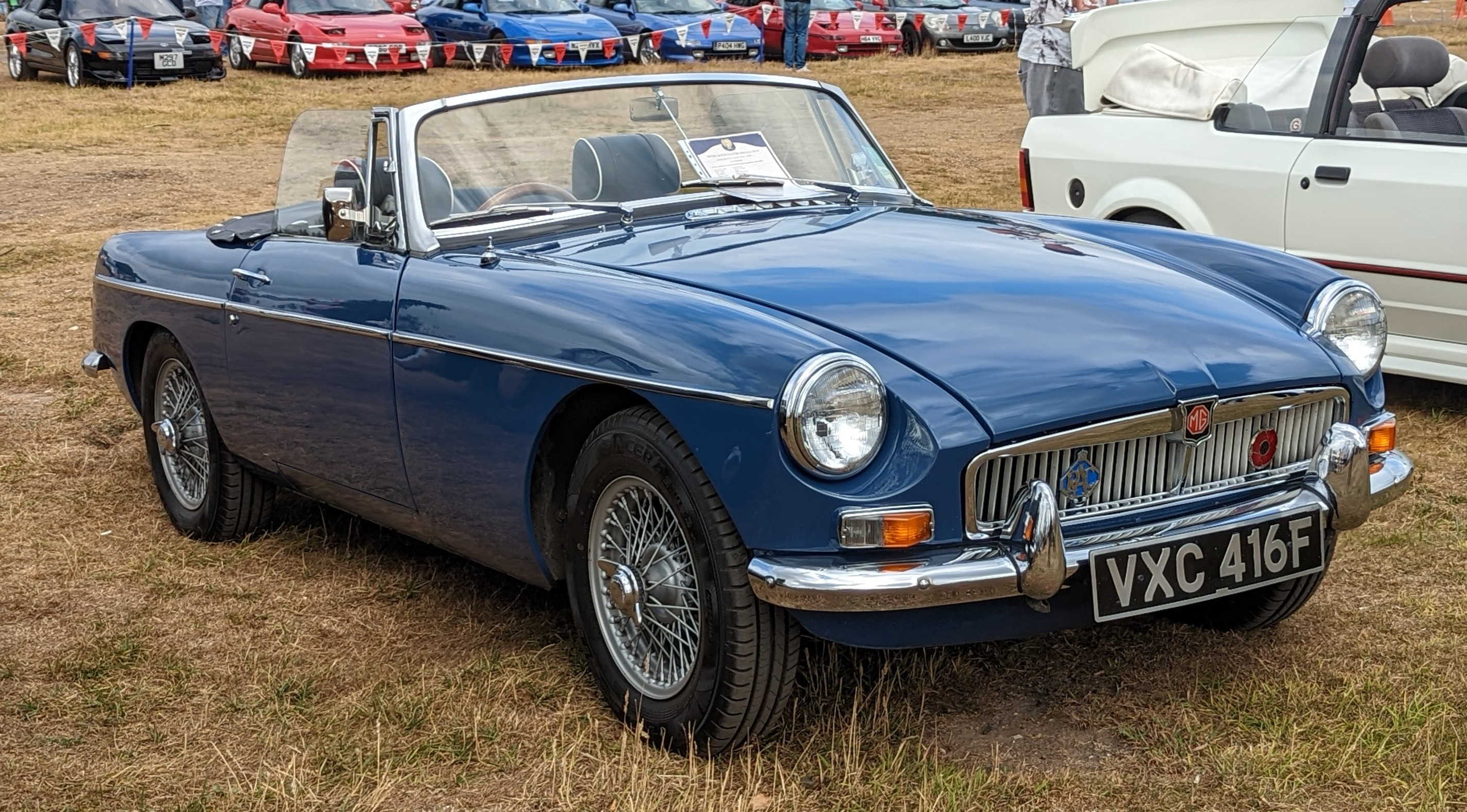
- 1967 MGB roadster

Overview
- Manufacturer: British Motor Corporation (1963–1968); British Leyland (1968–1980); Rover Group (1992–1995)
- Production: 1962–1980 (original); 1992–1995 (MG RV8)
- Assembly: United Kingdom: Abingdon; Cowley, Oxford (Cowley plant: MG RV8); Australia (BMC Australia): Enfield; Zetland
- Designer: Don Hayter

Body and chassis
- Class: Sports car
- Layout: FR layout

Chronology
- Predecessor: MGA
- Successor: MG F

The MGB is a two-door sports car which was manufactured from 1962 until 1980 by the British Motor Corporation (BMC) (later the Austin-Morris division of British Leyland) and marketed under the MG marque. It was announced and its details first published on 19 September 1962. Introduced as a four-cylinder soft-top roadster, later variants include the MGB GT three-door 2+2 coupé (1965–1980), the six-cylinder sports car and coupé MGC (1967–1969), and the eight-cylinder 2+2 coupé, the MGB GT V8 (1973–1976).

Replacing the MGA in 1962, production of the MGB and its variants continued until 1980, though fixed roof GT models ceased export to the US in 1974. Sales for the MGB, MGC and MGB GT V8 combined totaled 523,836 cars. After a 12-year hiatus, the MGB re-entered production as the heavily modified MG RV8 with a limited run of 2,000 cars before its final replacement in 1995 by the MG F.

== History ==
Development of the MGB started at least as early as 1958 with the prototype known by its Abingdon codename; MG EX205. In structure the car was a progressive, modern design in 1962, using a unitary structure, instead of the traditional body-on-frame construction used on both the MGA and MG T-types and the MGB's rival, the Triumph TR series. However, components such as brakes and suspension were developments of the earlier 1955 MGA (and the MGA's suspension being an evolution of the 1947 Y-Type), with the B-Series engine having its origins in 1947. The lightweight design reduced manufacturing costs while adding to overall vehicle strength. Wind-up windows were standard, and a comfortable driver's compartment offered plenty of legroom. A parcel shelf was fitted behind the seats.

The MGB achieved a 0–60 mph (97 km/h) time of just over 11 seconds. The three-bearing 1,798 cc B-Series engine produced 95 hp (71 kW) at 5,400 rpm – upgraded in October 1964 to a five-bearing crankshaft. From 1975, US-market MGB engines were de-tuned to meet emission standards, ride height was increased by an inch (25 mm), and distinctive rubber bumpers were fitted to meet bumper standards.

The MGB was one of the first cars to feature controlled crumple zones designed to protect the driver and passenger in a 30 mph (48 km/h) impact with an immovable barrier (200 ton). Nevertheless, the British AA motoring association has described the car, like many other classic models, as much less safe than modern cars. The issue received public attention following a 2013 case in which a driver in a hired 1963 MGB was killed in a collision with a taxi.

A limited production of 2,000 units of the RV8 was produced by Rover in the 1990s. Despite the similarity in appearance to the roadster, the RV8 had less than 5% parts interchangeability with the original car.

The MGB remains a popular choice for collectors due to inexpensive and readily available parts and simple mechanics.

== Drivetrain ==
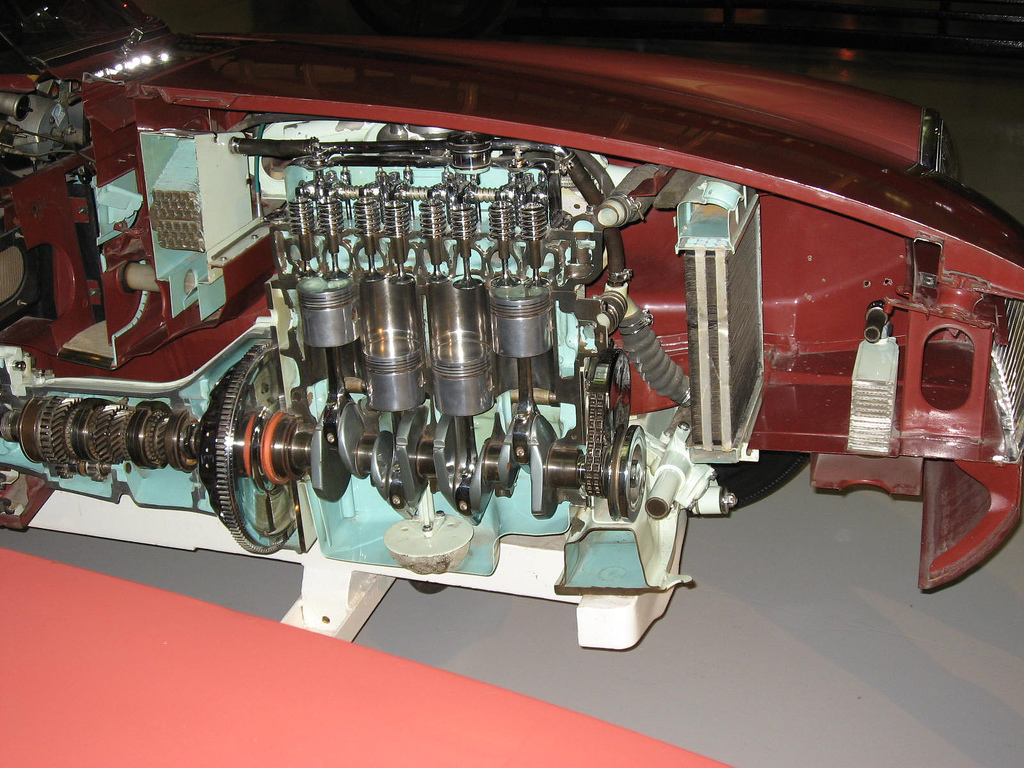
A sectioned MGB showing engine and gearbox configuration

All MGBs (except the V8 and 6 cylinder versions) used the BMC B-Series engine. This engine was essentially an enlarged version of that used in the MGA with engine displacement being increased from 1,622 to 1,798 cc. The earlier cars used a three-main-bearing crankshaft, 18G-series. In February 1964 positive crank-case breathing was introduced and the engine prefix changed to 18GA, until October 1964, when a five-bearing crankshaft design was introduced, the engine prefix became 18GB. Horsepower was rated at 95 net bhp on both five-main-bearing and earlier three-bearing cars with peak power coming at 5,400 rpm with a 6,000 rpm redline. Torque output on the MGB had a peak of 110 lb⋅ft (150 N⋅m) and fuel consumption was around 25 miles per imperial gallon (11 L/100 km; 21 mpg_{‑US}). US specification cars saw power fall in 1968 with the introduction of emission standards and the use of air or smog pumps. In 1971 UK spec cars still had 95 bhp (71 kW) at 5,500 rpm, with 105 lb⋅ft (142 N⋅m) torque at 2,500 rpm. Engine prefixes became 18V and the SU carburettor needles were changed for reasons of the latest emission regulations, under ECE15. By 1973 it was 94 bhp (70 kW); by 1974 it was 87, with 103 lb⋅ft (140 N⋅m) torque; by 1975 it was 85 with 100 lb⋅ft (140 N⋅m). Some California specification cars produced only around 70 hp (52 kW) by the late 1970s. The compression ratio was also reduced from 9:1 to 8:1 on US spec cars in 1972.

All MGBs from 1963 to 1974 used twin 1.5-inch (38 mm) SU carburettors. US spec cars from 1975 used a single Stromberg 1.75-inch (44 mm) carburettor mounted on a combination intake–exhaust manifold. This greatly reduced power as well as created longevity problems as the (adjacent) catalytic converter tended to crack the intake–exhaust manifold. All MGBs used an SU-built electric fuel pump.

All MGBs from 1962 to 1967 used a four-speed manual gearbox with a non-synchromesh, spur cut first gear. Optional overdrive was available. This gearbox was based on that used in the MGA with some minor upgrades to cope with the additional output of the larger MGB engine. In 1968 the early gearbox was replaced by a full synchromesh unit based on the MGC gearbox. This unit was designed to handle the 150net bhp of the three-litre engine of the MGC and was thus over-engineered when mated with the standard MGB B-Series engine. The same transmission was used in the 3.5-litre V8 version of the MGB-GT-V8. An automatic three-speed transmission was also offered as a factory option, but was unpopular.

Electrically engaged overdrive gearboxes were an available option on all MGBs. The overdrive unit was operational in third and fourth gears (until 1977, when overdrive was only operational in fourth) but the overall ratio in third gear overdrive was roughly the same as fourth gear direct. The overdrive unit was engaged by a toggle switch on the dashboard or by pulling the wiper lever towards the driver, model dependent. The switch was moved to the top of the gearshift knob in 1977. Overdrives were fitted to less than 20% of all MGBs.

There were three different types of overdrive transmissions fitted to the MGB.

1962–1964, 1965–1967

- Laycock Type D OD (note external solenoid)
- A hole in the bell housing where the starter nose poked through
- "Shield" shaped access cover
- 1020 TPM for OD and 1040 TPM for non-OD

The gearbox input shaft, flywheel and engine backing plate were changed with the advent of the five-main-bearing engine in 1965. Therefore, the transmission for a three-main-bearing engine (1962–1964) differed from its later counterpart.

1968 to 1974.5

- Laycock Type LH OD
- Rectangular shaped access cover
- Oval clutch fork boot
- Dipstick (for checking oil)
- Black label on the OD solenoid cover stamped "22/61972"
- 1280 TPM for OD and non-OD
- Speedometer drive gear (on the mainshaft) was blue
- Speedometer driven gear (on removable drive housing) was white with 21 teeth

1974.5 to 1980

- Laycock Type LH OD
- Rectangular shaped access cover
- Square clutch fork boot
- Side fill plug (no dipstick)
- Blue label on the OD solenoid cover stamped "22/62005"
- 1000 TPM for OD and non-OD
- Speedometer drive gear (on the mainshaft) was red
- Speedometer driven gear (on removable drive housing) was red with 20 teeth

Overdrive operated in fourth gear only in units made from February 1977 onward.

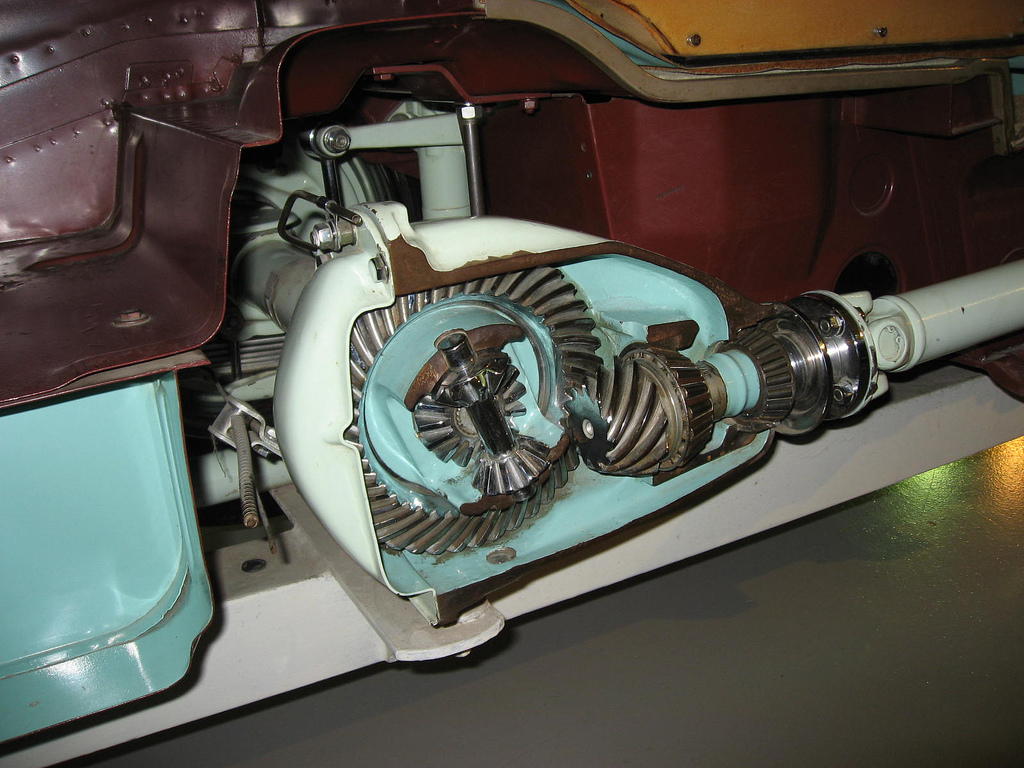
A sectioned MGB showing the rear axle and differential

Early MGBs used the "banjo" type differential carried over from the MGA with the rear axle ratio reduced from the MGA's 4.1 (or 4.3) to 3.9 to 1. (Compensating for the reduction from 15 inch to 14-inch (360 mm) wheels). MGB GTs first began using a tube-type rear axle in 1967. This unit was substantially stronger, being, like the later gearbox, designed for the three-litre MGC. All MGBs used the tube-type axle from 1968.

All MGBs were fitted with 11-inch (280 mm) solid (non-ventilated) disc brakes on the front with drum brakes on the rear. The front brake calipers were manufactured by Lockheed and used two pistons per caliper. The brake system on the MGB GT was the same as the roadster with the exception of slightly larger rear brake cylinders. A single-circuit hydraulic system was used before 1968 when dual-circuit (separate front and rear systems) were installed on all MGBs to comply with US regulations. Servo assistance (power brakes) was not standard until 1975. Many modern and contemporary testers have commented on the very heavy brake pedal pressure needed to stop the non-servo-assisted cars.

The MGB initially had an extremely simple electrical system. Dash-mounted toggle switches controlled the lights, ventilation fan, and wipers with only the direction indicators being mounted on a stalk on the steering column. The ignition switch was also mounted on the dash. Like the MGA, the MGB used two 6-volt batteries wired in series to give a 12-volt positive earth configuration. The batteries were placed under a scuttle panel behind the seats making access difficult; the location gave excellent weight distribution and thus improved handling. The charging system used a Lucas dynamo. Later MGBs had considerable changes to the electrical system including the use of a single 12-volt battery, a change from positive to negative earth, safety-type toggle (rocker) switches, alternator in lieu of dynamo, additional warning lights and buzzers, and most common functions moved to steering column stalks.

From 1972 there were two different radial tyre sizes factory-fitted to new cars, depending on whether the car was a roadster,(155/80x14) or a GT (165/80x14). With the 1974.5 arrival of the rubber bumper cars the factory-fitted tyre size was simplified to 165/80x14 for all cars, irrespective of whether the car was a roadster or a GT, and also irrespective of the wheel type (wire or RoStyle). The factory built V8s were fitted with alloy wheels and full profile 175HR14 tyres. The "Jubilee" model, made to celebrate the 50th anniversary of the company in 1975, had the alloy wheels from the V8, allegedly because the V8 was not selling and they had a large stock. With a pre-war British racing green colour, tinted glass, gold body stipes and other gold trim, 751 Jubilees were made. One was destroyed in an advertising stunt that went wrong. There are thought to be about half of them left as of 2021. The final 1,000 LE models were the last cars to leave the factory with alloy wheels.

== MGB Roadster ==
MGB roadster
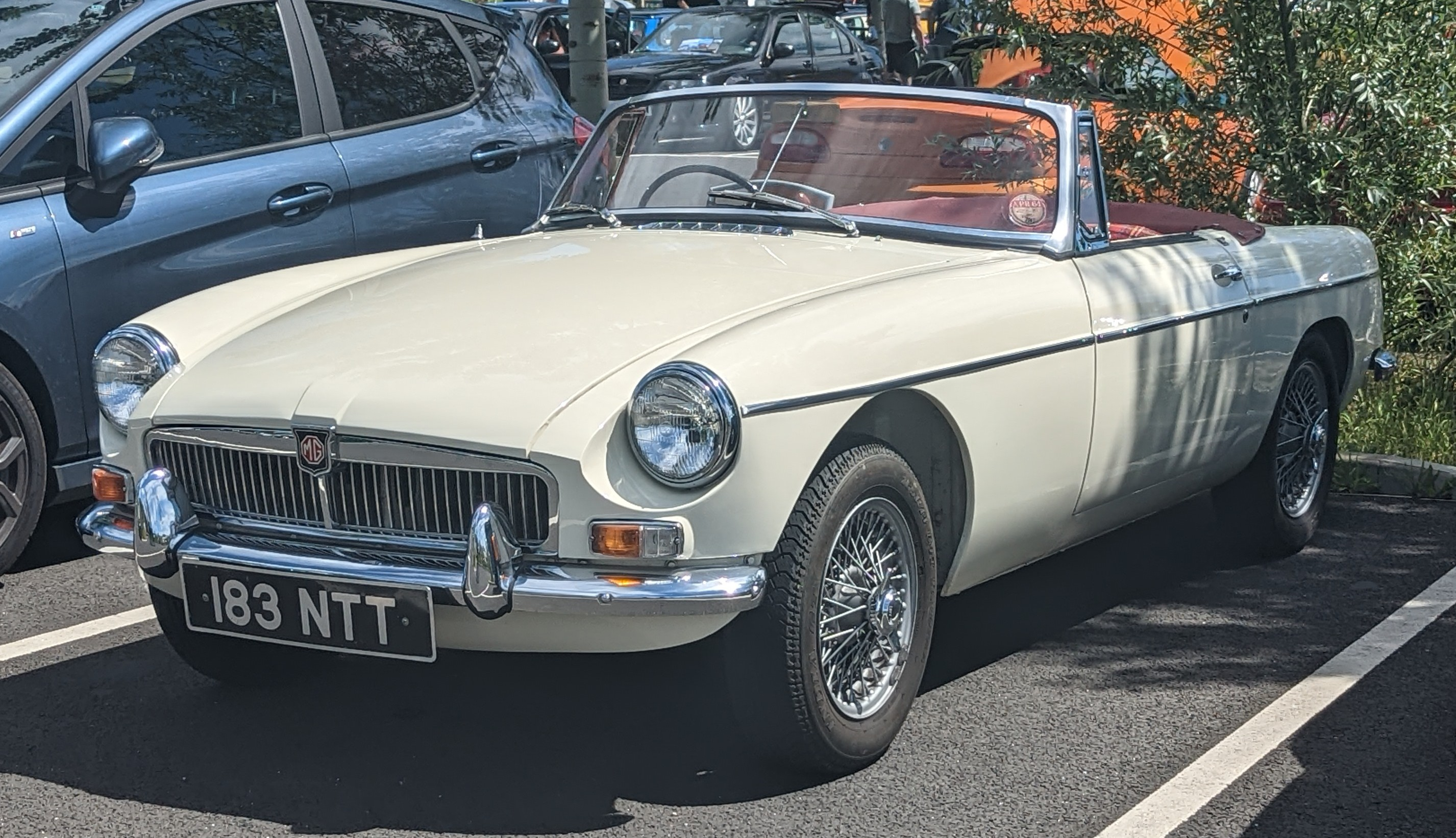
- 1963 MG B roadster

Overview
- Production: 1962–1980

Body and chassis
- Body style: 2-door roadster

Powertrain
- Engine: 1.8 L B-Series I4
- Transmission: 4-speed manual; 3-speed Borg-Warner 35 automatic (UK only)

Dimensions
- Wheelbase: 2,312 mm (91.0 in)
- Length: 3,886 mm (153.0 in); 4,019 mm (158.2 in) (rubber bumper version)
- Width: 1,524 mm (60.0 in)
- Height: 1,219 mm (48.0 in); 1,295 mm (51.0 in) (rubber bumper version)

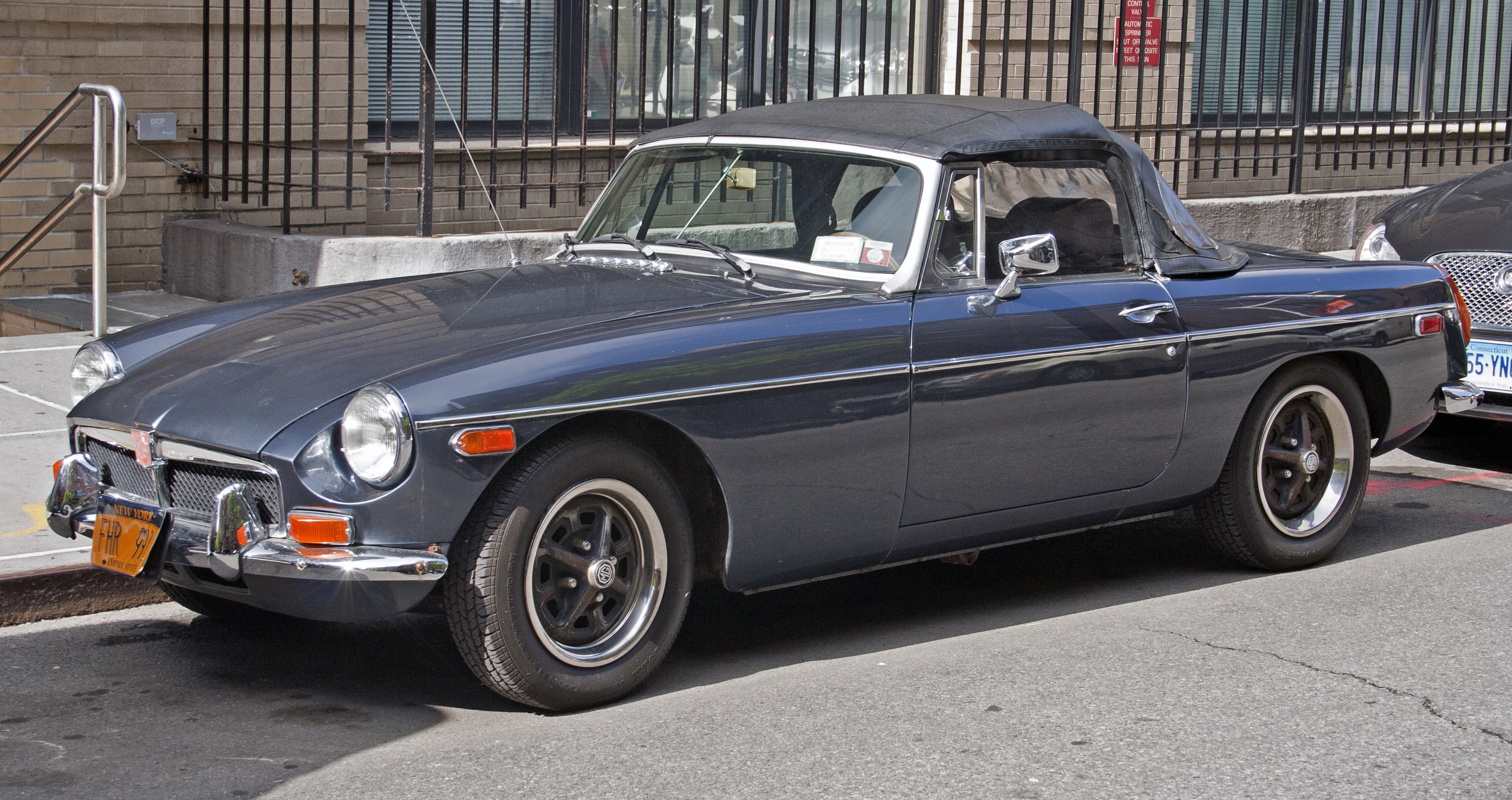
Early 1974 MGB (US model)

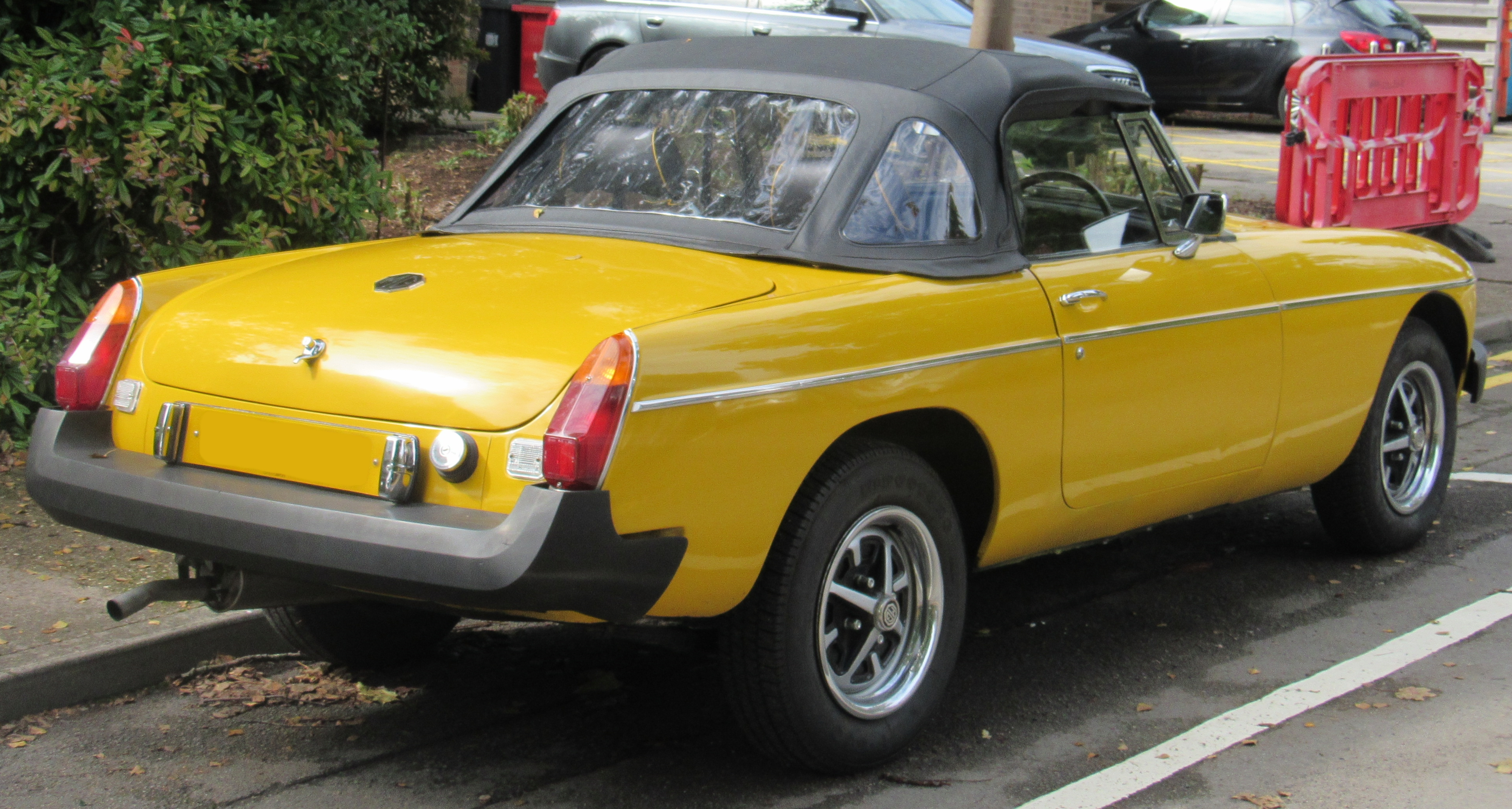
Rear of a late "black bumper special" MGB, showing changes introduced in 1974 to meet new US regulations.

The roadster was the first of the MGB range to be produced. The body was a pure two-seater; a small rear seat was a rare option at one point. The MGB offered better space utilisation to passengers and luggage than the preceding MG A, despite being both 3 in (7.6 cm) shorter in wheelbase and overall length, and 2 in (5.1 cm) lower. Growing in width by the same, gave the MGB a distinctly lower and more squat stance than its forebear. The suspension was softer, giving a smoother ride, and the larger engine gave a slightly higher top speed. The four-speed gearbox was an uprated version of the one used in the MGA with an optional (electrically activated) overdrive transmission. Wheel diameter dropped from 15 to 14 in (36 cm).

In late 1967, enough changes were introduced for MG to declare the 1968 model year a Mark II model. Changes included new gearboxes with revised ratios and synchromesh on all four gears, an optional Borg-Warner 35 automatic gearbox (except in the US, peculiarly), a new rear axle, and an alternator in place of the dynamo with a change to a negative earth system. The Mk II's new gearboxes required significantly altered floorpan sheet metal with a new, flat-topped transmission tunnel.

To meet US safety regulations for the 1968 model year, the MGB received a plastic and foam rubber covered "safety" dashboard, dubbed the "Abingdon pillow", and dual circuit brakes. Other markets continued with the steel dashboard. Rubery Owen RoStyle wheels were introduced to replace the previous pressed steel versions in 1969 and reclining seats were standardised.

1969 also saw three windscreen wipers instead of two to sweep the required percentage of the glass (US market only), high seat backs with head restraints and side marker lamps. The next year saw a new front grille, recessed, in black aluminium. The more traditional-looking polished grille returned in 1973 with a black "honeycomb" insert. In North America, 1970 saw split rear bumpers with the number-plate in between, 1971-1974 returned to the earlier single-piece full-length style chrome bumper.

Further changes in 1972 were to the interior with a new fascia.

To meet impact regulations, 1974 US models had the chrome bumper over-riders replaced with oversized rubber ones, nicknamed "Sabrinas" after the British actress Sabrina. In the second half of 1974 the chrome bumpers were replaced altogether. A new, steel-reinforced black rubber bumper at the front incorporated the grille area as well, giving a major restyling to the B's nose, and a matching rear bumper completed the change.

New US headlight height regulations also meant that the headlamps were too low. Rather than redesign the front of the car, British Leyland raised the car's suspension by 1-inch (25 mm). This, in combination with the new, far heavier bumpers, resulted in significantly poorer handling. For the 1975 model year only, the front anti-roll bar was deleted as a cost-saving measure (though still available as an option). The damage done by the British Leyland response to US legislation was partially alleviated by revisions to the suspension geometry in 1977, when a rear anti-roll bar was made standard equipment on all models. US emissions regulations also reduced horsepower.

In March 1979 British Leyland started the production of black-painted limited-edition MGB roadsters for the US market, meant for a total of 500 examples. Due to a high demand for the limited-edition model, production ended with 6,682 examples. The UK received bronze-painted roadsters and a silver GT model limited edition. The production run of home market limited edition MGBs was split between 421 roadsters and 579 GTs.

The last MGB roadster produced at Abingdon returned to Abingdon County Hall Museum on 1 December 2011, with the help of British Motor Heritage. It was lifted up 30 feet through a first-floor window of the Grade I listed building with inches to spare and now forms part of the collection on display in the main gallery.

Work on a successor for the MGB had been undertaken as early as 1964 with the EX234, but due to the excellent sales of the MGB and MG Midget, BMC cancelled it in 1966. In 1968 a second proposed replacement was developed, the ADO76, but British Leyland had ceased work on that project by the end of 1970; the ADO76 would ultimately become the rubber-bumper version of the MGB in 1974. A third MGB replacement was developed in 1969, this time with a mid-mounted BMC E-series engine, semi-independent Hydrolastic suspension and Ferrari-like styling. This was cancelled in 1970 in favour of the more-conventional Triumph Bullet, which later became the TR7. When the Abingdon factory finally closed in late 1980, British Leyland did not replace it, with the EX234 prototype finally being sold at auction in 2016.

The decision to discontinue the MGB came about largely due to the poor sales performance of the Triumph TR7, which had largely taken over as BL's contemporary offering in the small sports car market. BL management felt that continued production of the MGB was cannibalising the TR7's sales and this therefore was a justification for taking it off the market. However, the TR7 failed to sell and was axed a year later. The MG marque was subsequently used to badge engineer sports versions of the Austin Metro, Austin Maestro and Austin Montego throughout the 1980s, prior to the re-emergence of the MGB in late 1992 as the MG RV8.

== MGB GT ==
MGB GT
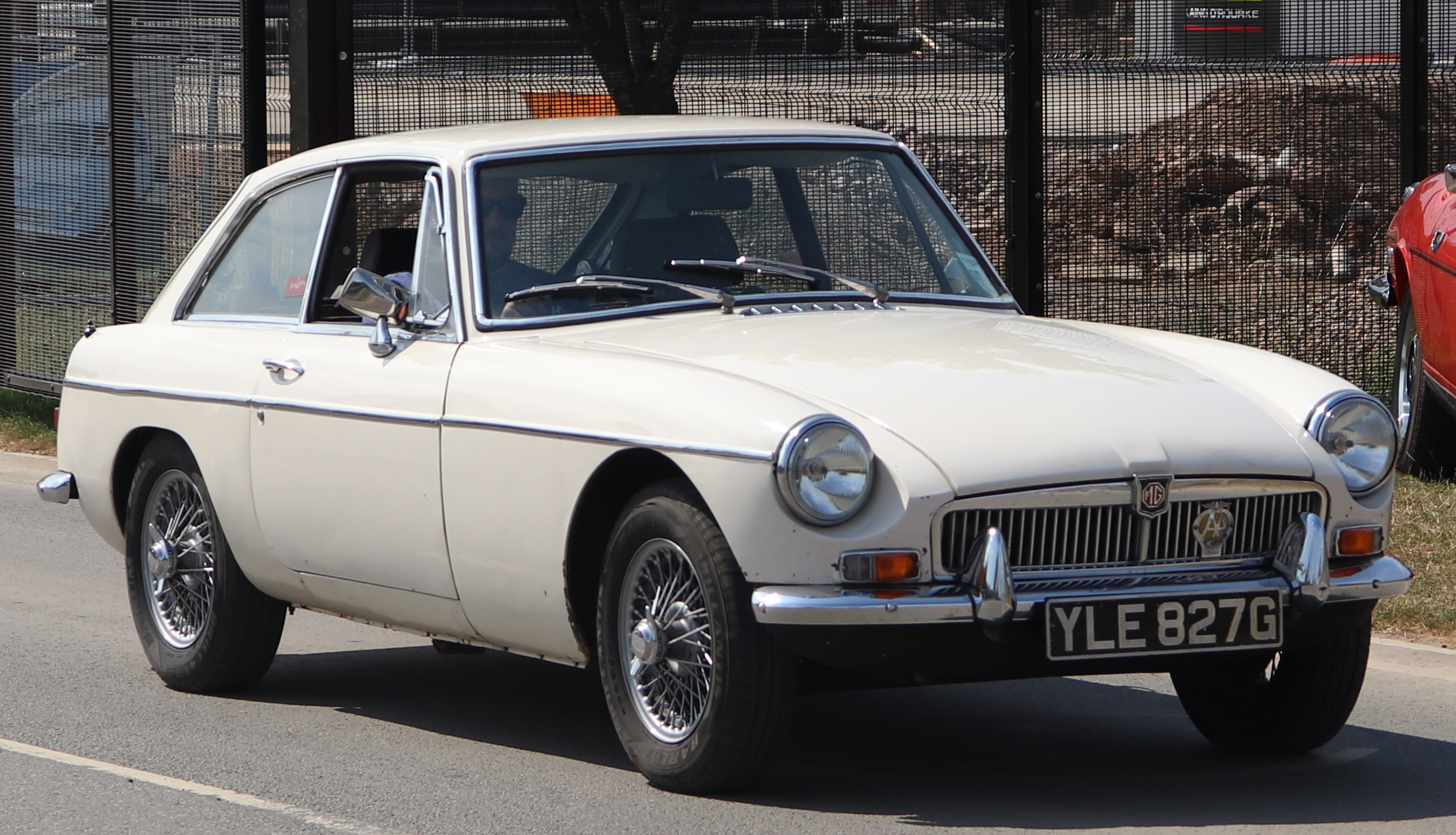

Overview
- Production: 1965–1980
- Designer: Pininfarina

Body and chassis
- Body style: 2-door hatchback coupé

Powertrain
- Engine: 1.8 L B-Series I4

Dimensions
- Wheelbase: 2,312 mm (91.0 in)
- Length: 3,886 mm (153.0 in); 4,019 mm (158.2 in) rubber bumper version
- Width: 1,524 mm (60.0 in)
- Height: 1,238 mm (48.7 in); 1,295 mm (51.0 in) rubber bumper version

The fixed-roof MGB GT was introduced in October 1965. Production continued until 1980, although export to the US ceased in 1974. The MGB GT sported a greenhouse designed by Pininfarina and launched the sporty "hatchback" style. By combining the sloping rear window with the rear deck lid, the B GT offered the utility of a station wagon while retaining the style and shape of a coupe. This new configuration was a 2+2 design with a right-angled rear bench seat and far more luggage space than in the roadster. Relatively few components differed, although the MGB GT did receive different suspension springs and anti-roll bars and a different windscreen which was more easily and inexpensively serviceable. In 2019, Road & Track named the GT one of the "16 of Pininfarina's Most Beautiful Designs That Aren't Ferraris."

Although acceleration of the GT was slightly slower than that of the roadster, owing to its increased weight, top speed improved by 5 mph (8.0 km/h) to 105 mph (169 km/h) because of better aerodynamics.

A special edition of the GT was produced in 1975 for the 50th Anniversary of the MG Car Company. It was in pre-war British Racing Green, had tinted glass, gold body stripes, V8 alloy wheels painted in gold and black, and other gold trim. 751 Jubilees were made, one of which was destroyed in an advertising stunt that went wrong. There are thought to be about half of them left as of 2021.

The MGB Berlinette produced by the Belgian coach builder Jacques Coune used a raised windscreen to accommodate the fastback. Fifty-six were produced.

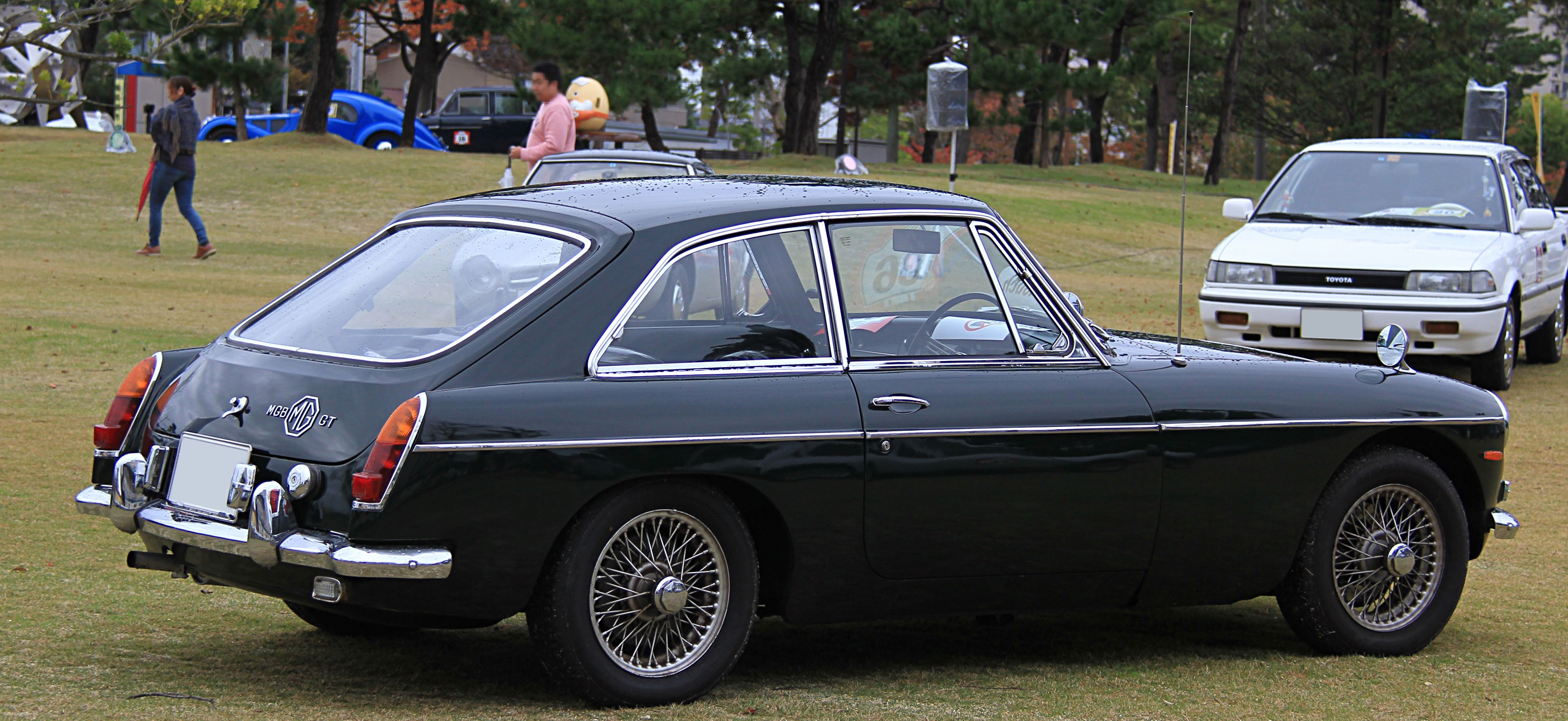
MGB GT (1967)

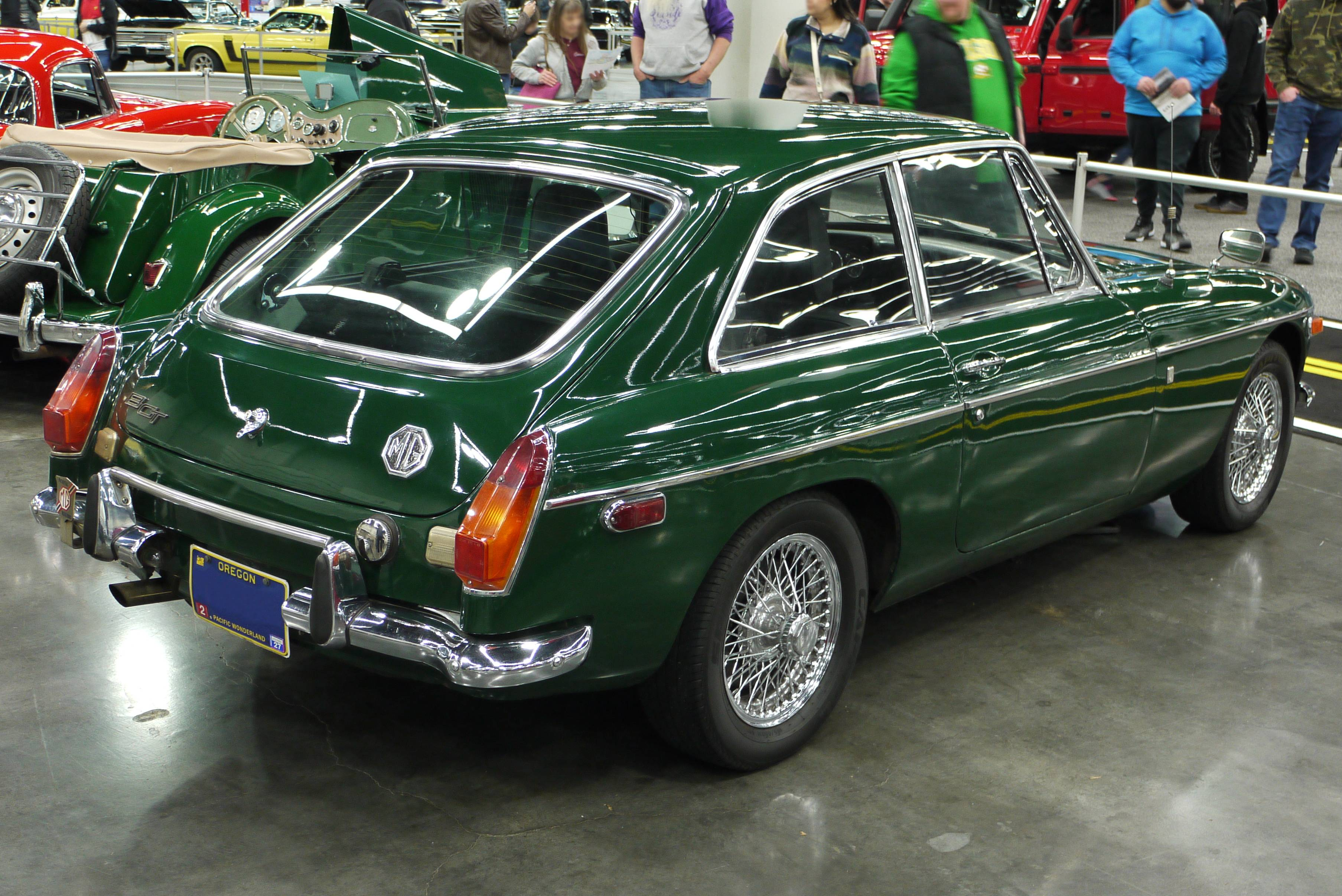
MGB GT with split rear bumper (1970)

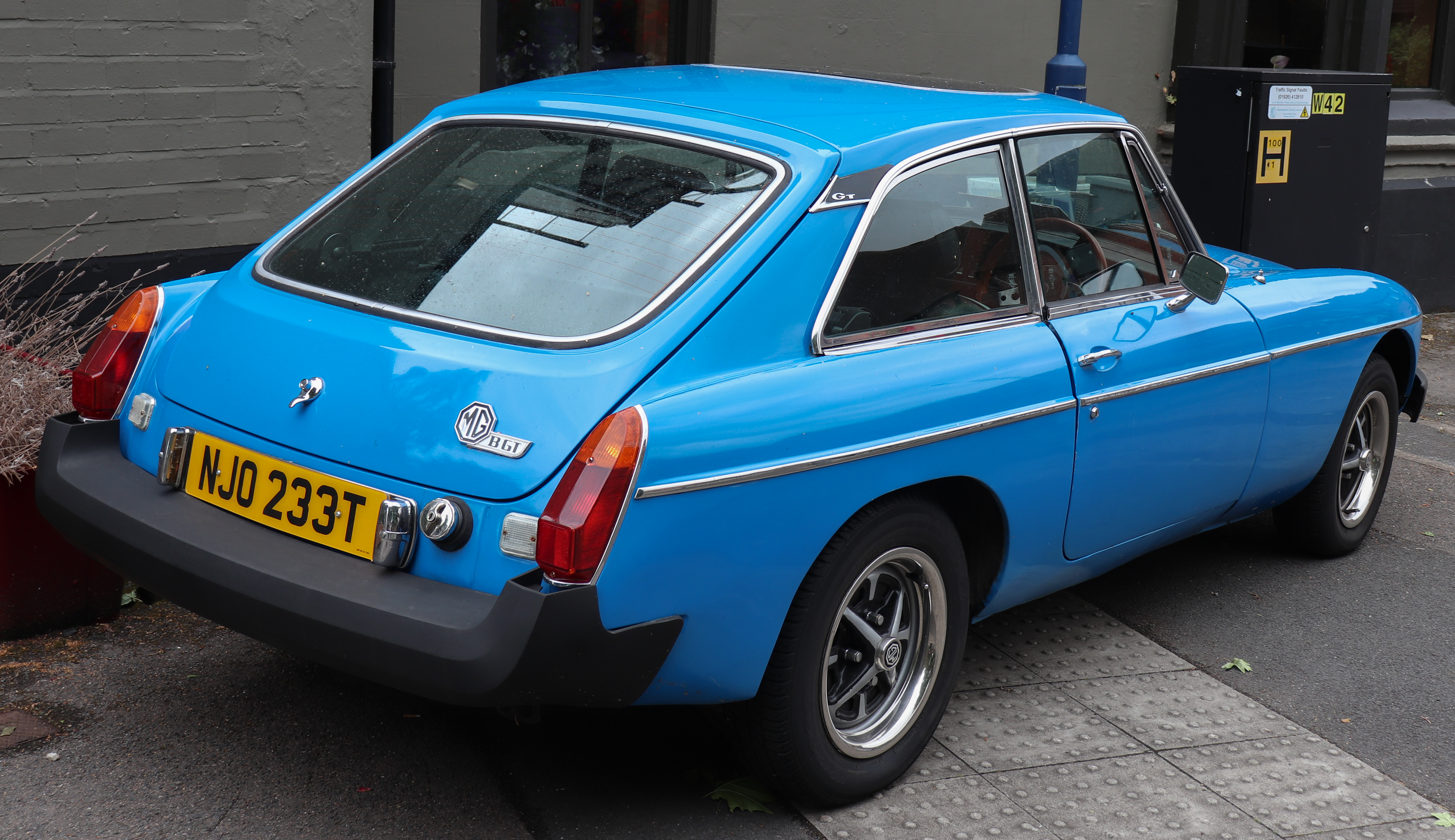
MGB GT (1978)

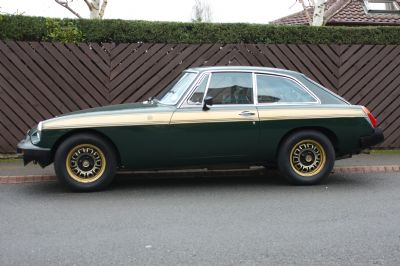
An MGB GT Jubilee

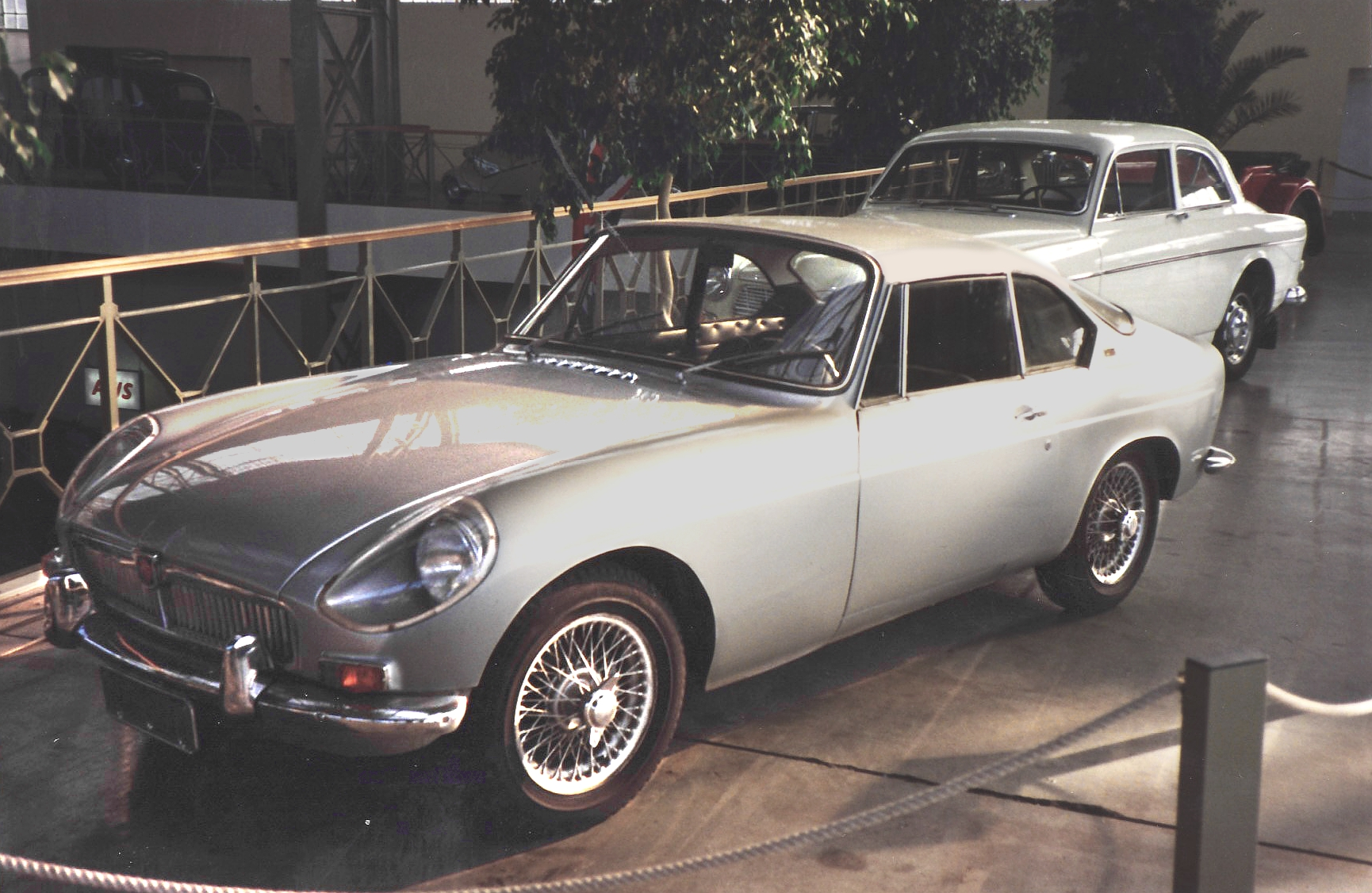
MGB Berlinette by Jacques Coune Carrossier of Belgium

== MGC ==
MGC & MGC GT
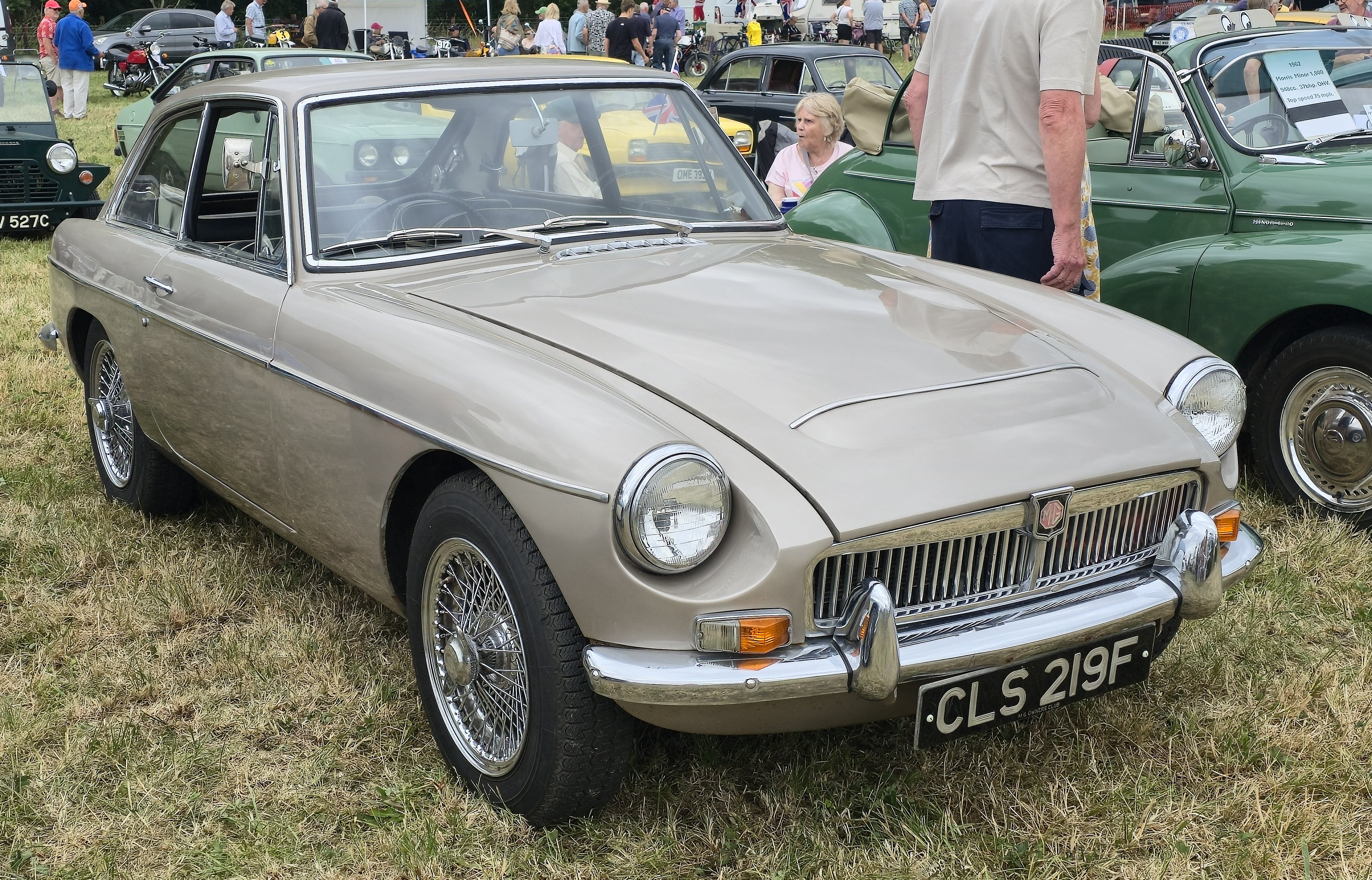
- MGC GT

Overview
- Production: 1967–1969

Body and chassis
- Body style: 2-door roadster; 2-door coupe

Powertrain
- Engine: 2.9 L C-Series I6

Chronology
- Predecessor: Austin-Healey 3000

The MGC was a 2,912 cc, straight-six version of the MGB sold from 1967 and produced until August 1969 with some sales running on into 1970. The car was given the model code ADO52. It was intended as a replacement for the Austin-Healey 3000 Mk. III which would have been ADO51 but in that form never got beyond the design proposal stage. The first engine to be considered was an Australian-designed six-cylinder version of the BMC B-Series but the production versions used a new seven-main-bearing development of the Morris Engines designed C-Series that was also to be used for the new Austin 3-Litre four-door saloon. In the twin SU carburettor form used in the MGC the engine produced 145 bhp (108 kW) at 5,250 rpm. The body shell needed considerable revisions around the engine bay and to the floor pan, but externally the only differences were a distinctive bonnet bulge to accommodate the relocated radiator and a teardrop for carburettor clearance. It had different brakes from the MGB, 15 inch wheels with Pirelli Cinturato 165HR15 tyres (CA67). a lower geared rack and pinion and special torsion bar suspension with telescopic dampers. Like the MGB, it was available as a coupé (GT) and roadster. An overdrive gearbox or three-speed automatic gearbox were available as options. The car was capable of 120 mph (193 km/h) and a 0–60 mph time of 10.0 seconds.

The heavy engine - 209 lb (95 kg) heavier than the 1,798 cc MGB engine - and new suspension changed the vehicle's handling, and it received a mixed response in the automotive press. It later transpired that the BMC press department had set the tyre pressures of the cars in the launch fleet incorrectly (to the same values as the standard MGB) and that even the correct pressures were insufficient to get the best handling from the car.

The MGC was cancelled in 1969 after less than two years of production.

At the time of the car's launch the manufacturers stated that the Austin-Healey 3000 would continue to be offered as a parallel model priced on the domestic market at £1,126, compared to the MGC's £1,102.

In 1967 Prince Charles took delivery of an MGC GT (SGY 766F), which he passed down to Prince William 30 years later.

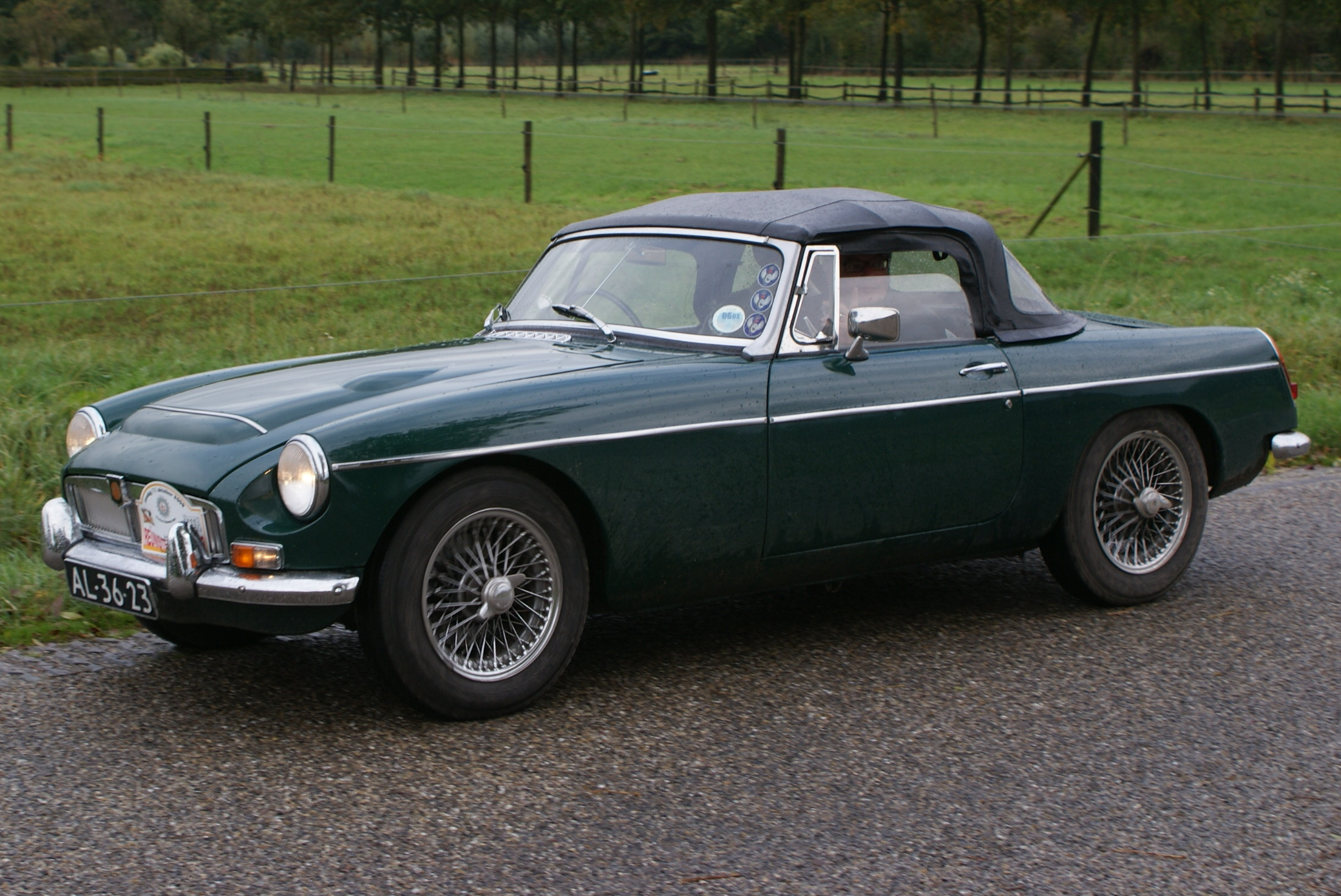
MGC roadster (1968)

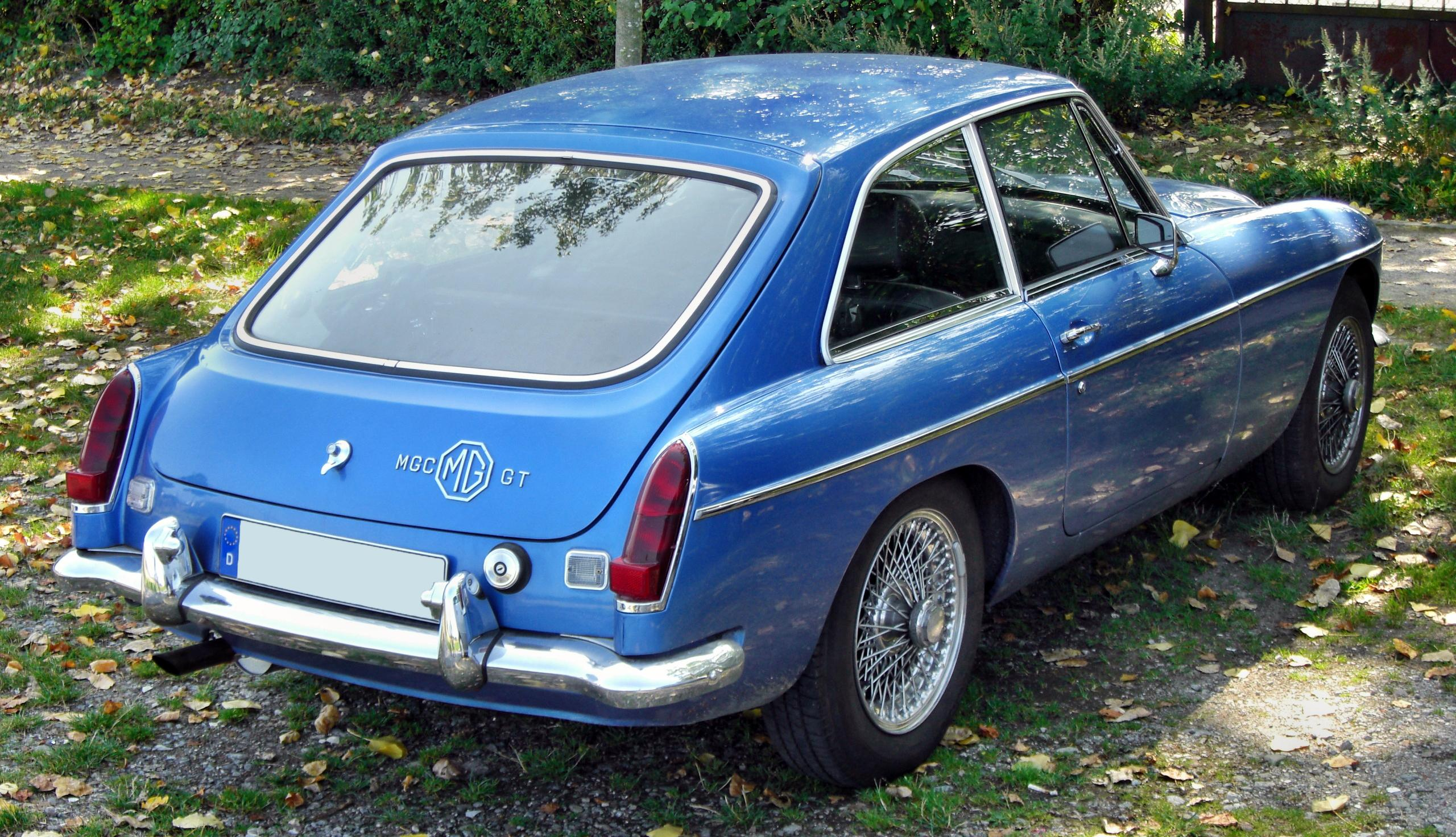
MGC GT (rear view)

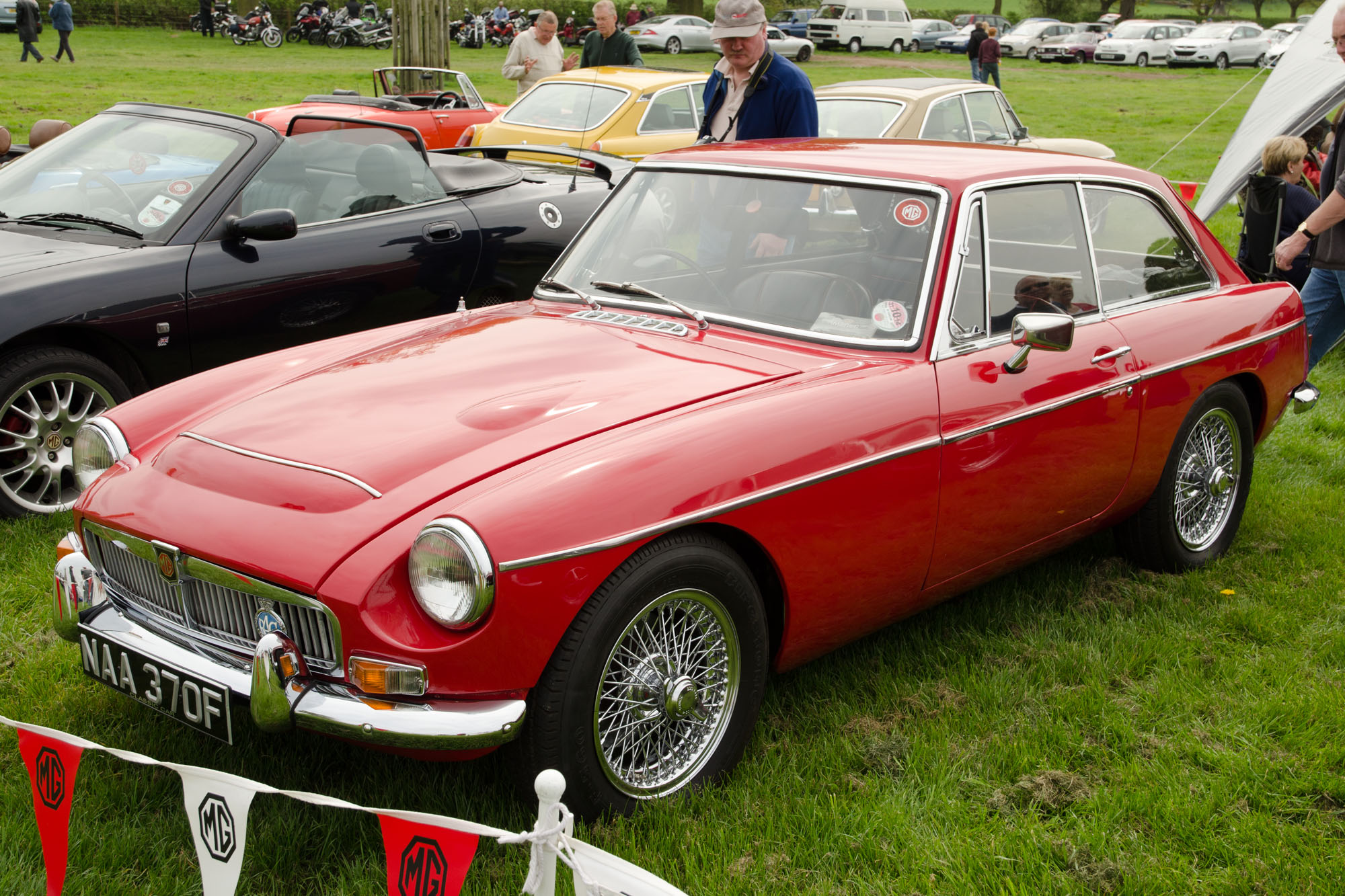
MGC GT

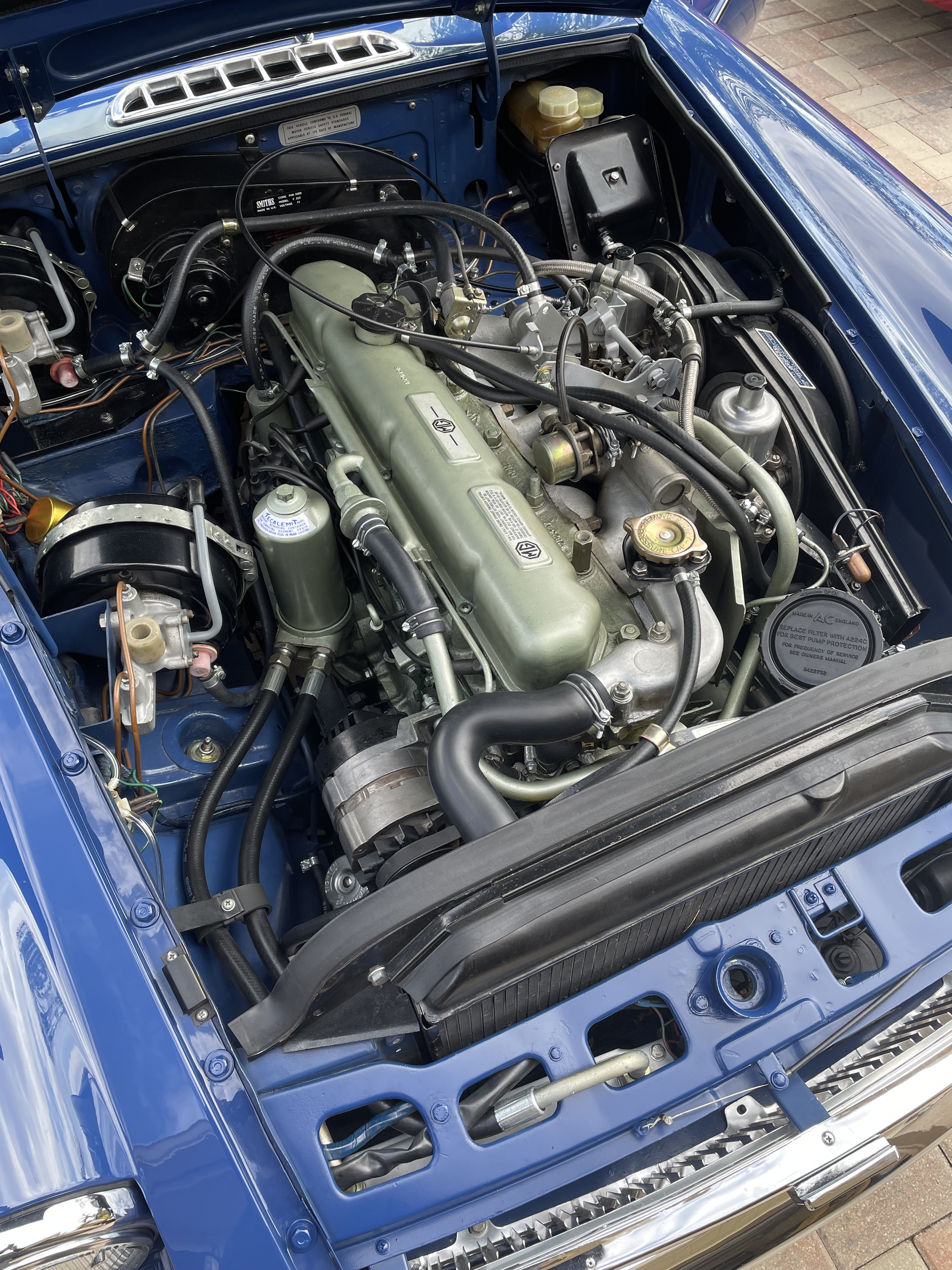
1969 MGC engine bay; original US emissions

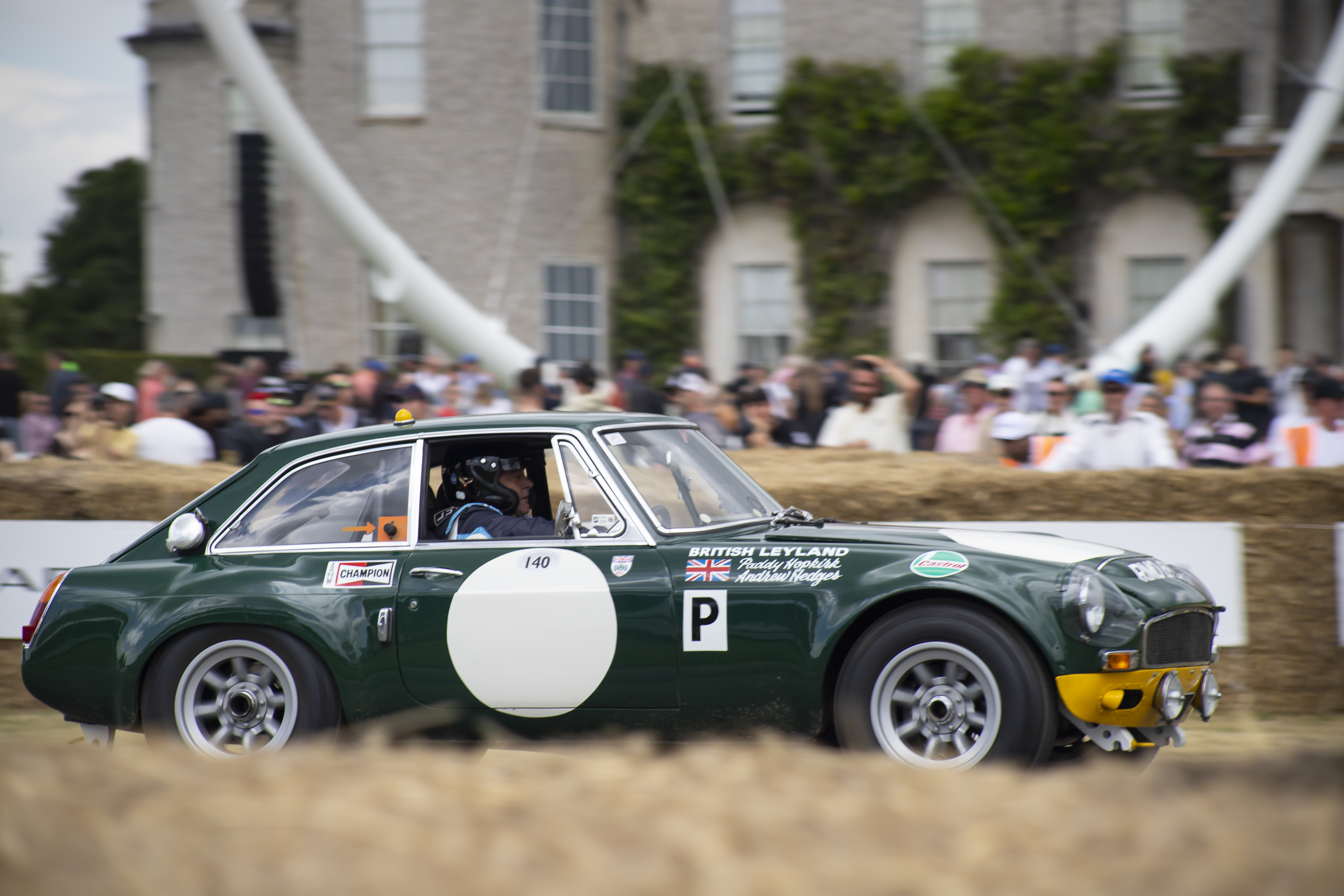
MGC GT Sebring

== MGB GT V8 ==
MGB GT V8
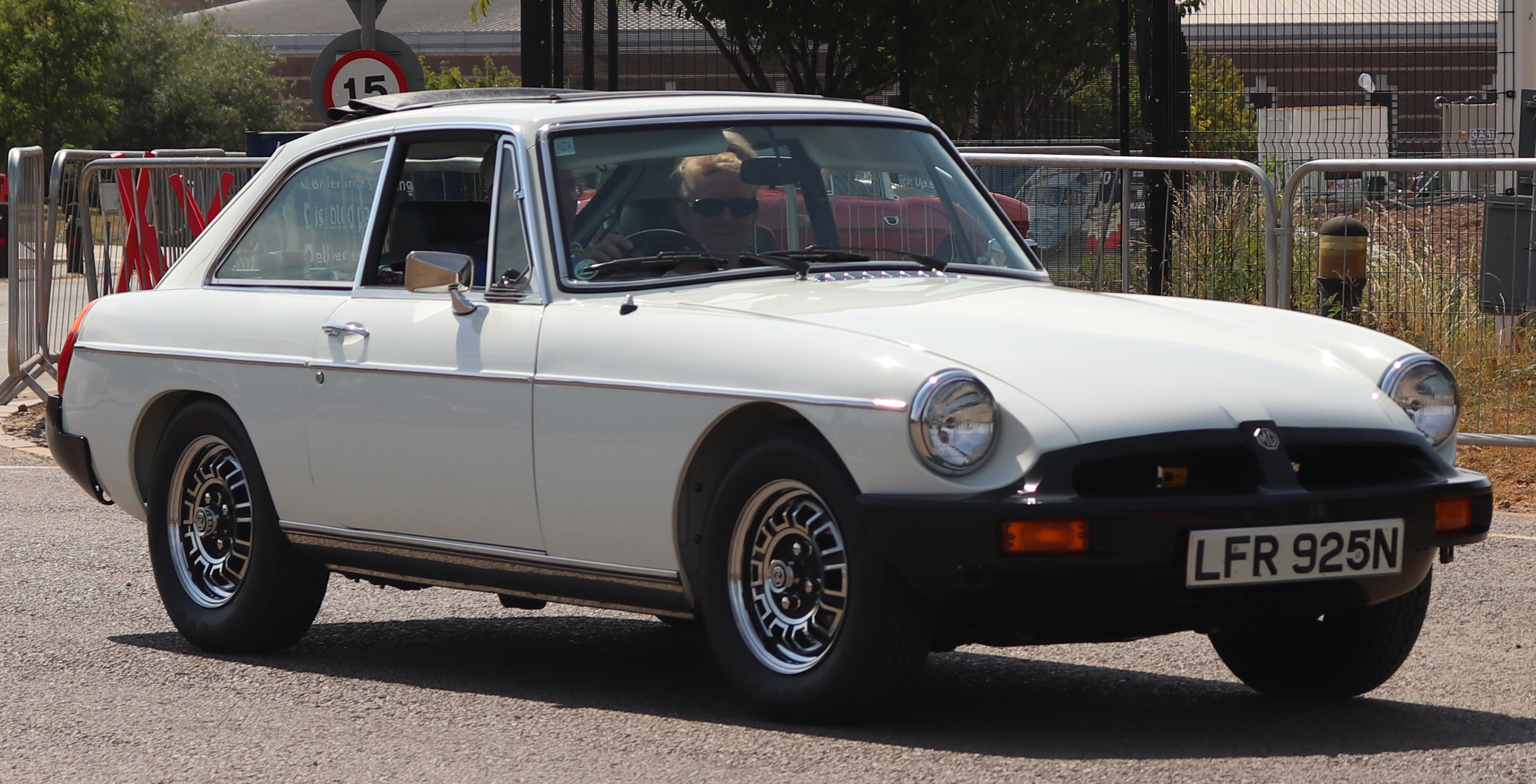
- MGB GT V8

Overview
- Production: 1973–1976

Body and chassis
- Body style: 2-door coupe

Powertrain
- Engine: 3.5 L Rover V8

MG began offering the MGB GT V8 in 1973 powered by the aluminium block/aluminium head 3,532 cc Rover V8 engine, first fitted to the Rover P5B. The V8's 137 hp (102 kW) and 193 lb⋅ft (262 N⋅m) of torque allowed it to reach 60 mph (97 km/h) in 7.7 seconds and go on to a 125 mph (201 km/h) top speed. Fuel consumption was just under 20 mpg.

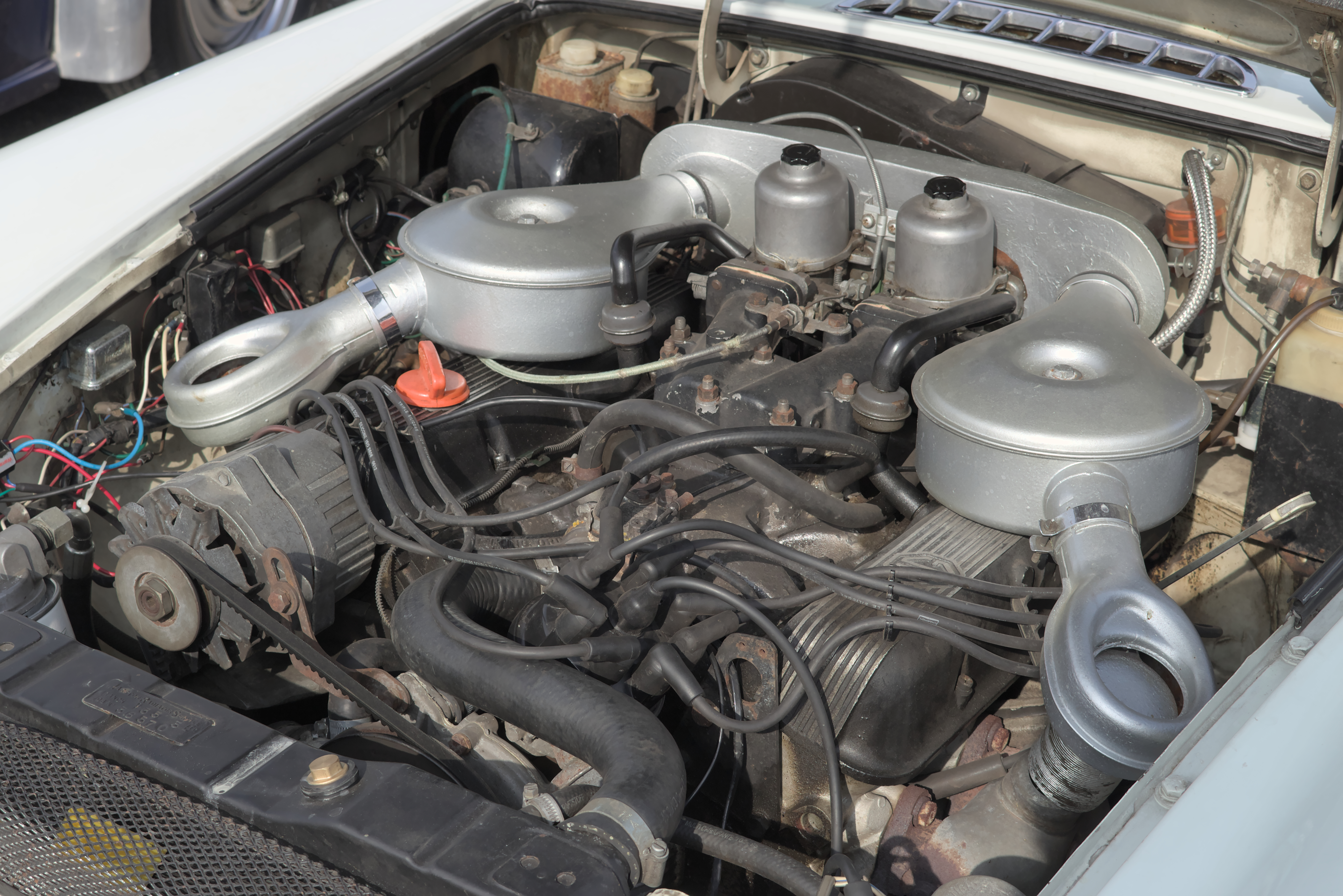
MGB GT V8 engine bay

By virtue of its aluminium cylinder block and heads, the Rover V8 engine weighed approximately 20 kg (44 lb) less than MG's iron straight-4. Unlike the iron straight-6 powered MGC, the V8 that provided the MGB GT V8's increased power and torque did not require significant chassis changes nor sacrifice handling.

Both chrome and rubber-bumpered GT versions of the V8-powered MGB were produced by the factory, with production ending in 1976. MG never attempted to export the MGB GT V8 to the United States. It chose not to even develop a left-hand-drive version of the MGB GT V8, although the Rover V8 engine had been offered in certain US-bound Rover models. The P6 3500, however, was withdrawn from the US after 1971 and the Rover 3500 SD1 only introduced in 1980 (its engine equipped with power-sapping emissions equipment) so that during the lifetime of the MGB GT V8 the engine was not being built in a federal version. Abingdon built seven LHD examples, sent them to America to achieve certification, and brought them back to the UK to be sold to mainland European countries.

== MG RV8 ==
MG RV8
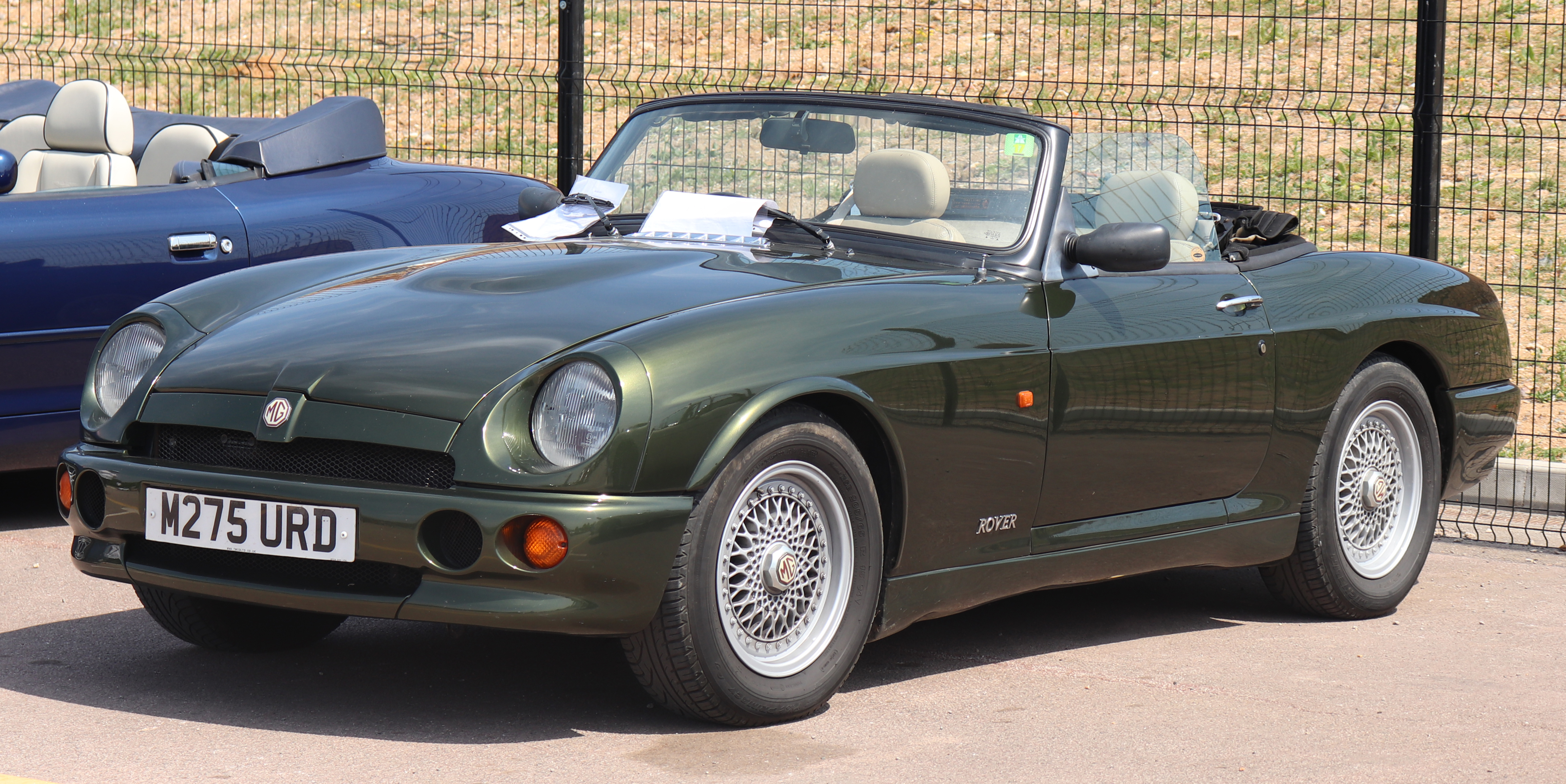
- MG RV8

Overview
- Production: 1992–1995

Body and chassis
- Body style: 2-seat roadster

Powertrain
- Engine: 3.9 L Rover V8

Subsequent to the launch of the Mazda MX-5 in 1989, British Motor Heritage (by then owned by Rover Group) had placed the MGB bodyshell back in production to serve the MGB restoration market. The success of the MX-5 had given Rover confidence that the market for 2 seater roadsters had re-emerged, and the decision was taken in 1991 to create an updated MGB model. The MG RV8 debuted at the British International Motor Show in October 1992. Code named the 'Adder' the RV8 body did not share much of the original MGB panels apart from the boot lid and doors. Reportedly, the RV8 used 5% carryover MGB parts, 20% improved MGB parts, and 75% new parts. Some of the notable visual changes compared to the MGB include flared inner and outer fenders, a new hood, Porsche 911 (964) headlights, and injection molded bumpers and headlight surrounds. The engine was the 3.9-litre version of the aluminium Rover V8, similar to the one used in the Range Rover. The suspension was updated, with independent front suspension with double wishbones, coil springs and telescopic shock absorbers. Whilst sharing the leaf spring rear and rear brakes of the MGB, a limited-slip differential was also fitted.

The British Motor Heritage manufactured bodyshell was painted at Rover's Cowley plant before final assembly at Cowley where the cars were hand-built in a separate unit, the LVA. The interior featured veneered burr elm woodwork and Connolly leather.

The engine produced 190 bhp (142 kW) at 4,750 rpm, achieving 0–60 mph (97 km/h) in 5.9 seconds. The price of the car put it in direct competition with contemporary rivals from specialist manufacturers such as TVR which offered modern technology and a more up to date driving experience. However, the MG RV8 has recently enjoyed a measure of a revival with reviewers seeing it as a useable touring GT "a likeable, charismatic steer, and one we wish more enthusiasts could enjoy".

A large proportion of the limited MG RV8 production went to Japan – 1,579 of the 1,983 produced. In the UK, 330 RV8s were sold initially. With the most popular colour being Woodcote green. Several hundred (possibly as many as 700) of MG RV8s were reimported back to the UK and also around 270 to Australia between 2000 and 2010, with a peak number of 485 registered at the DVLA in the UK. Several observers consider the RV8 a continuation of the MGB model. No left hand drive examples were produced.

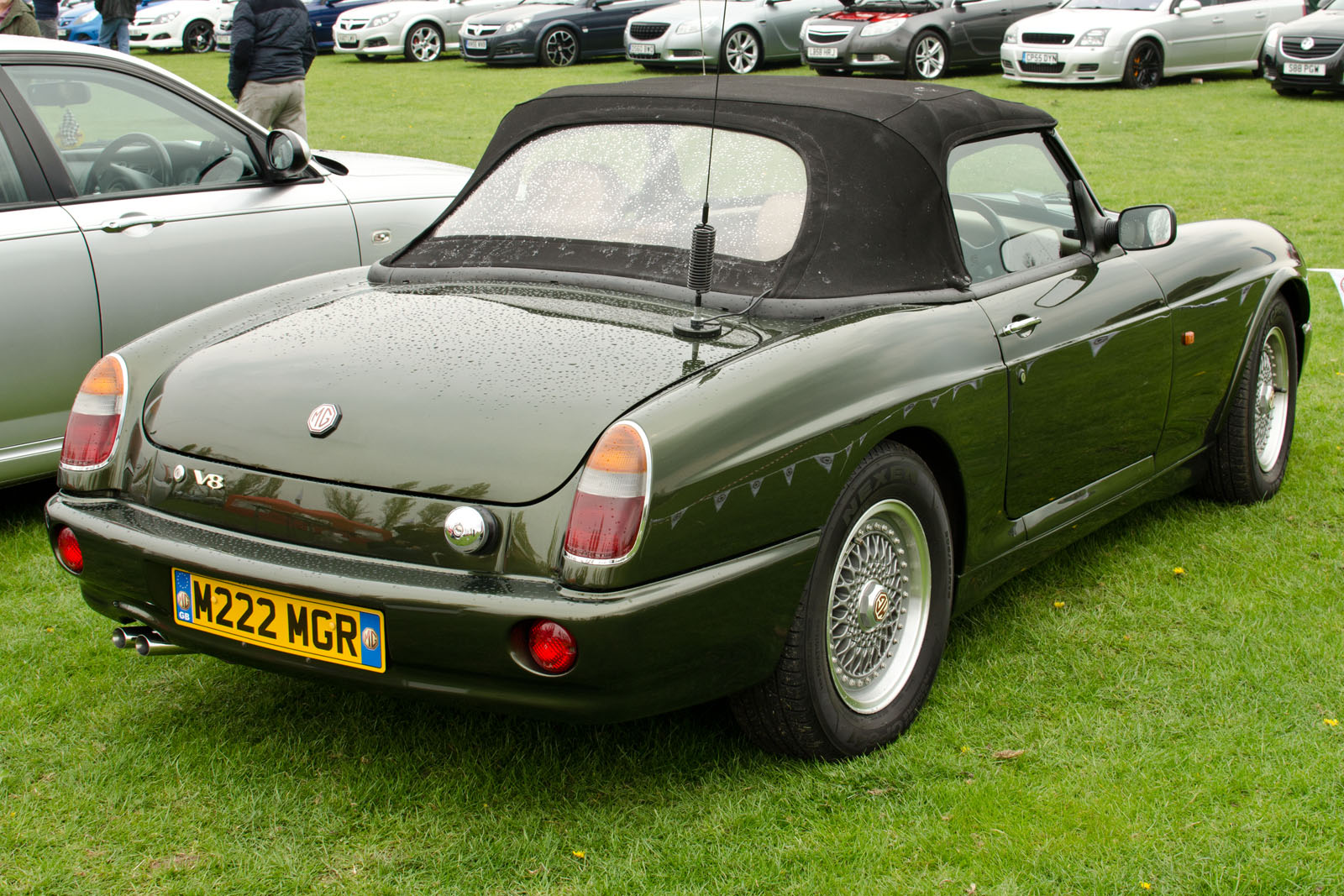
MG RV8 rear

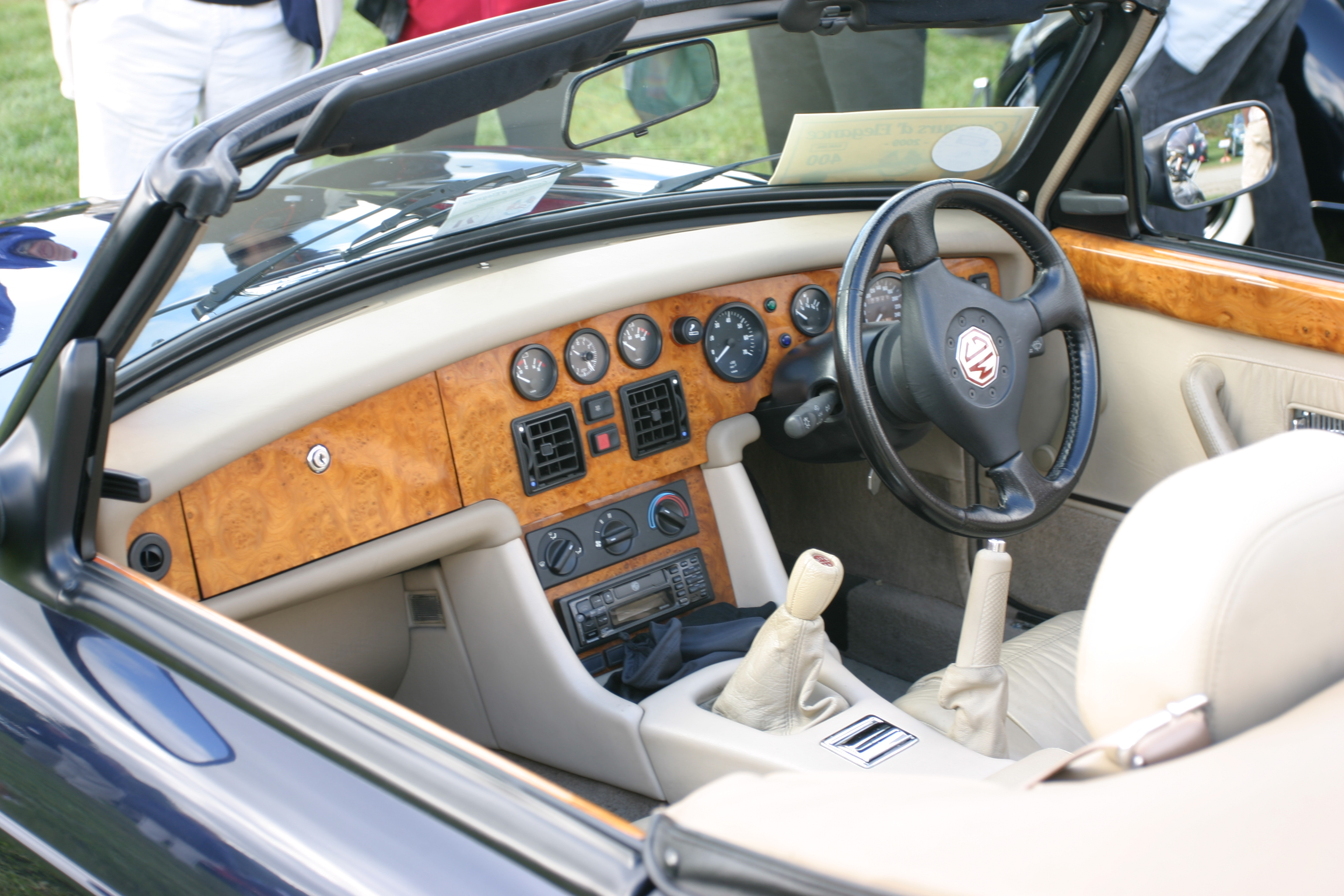
Interior

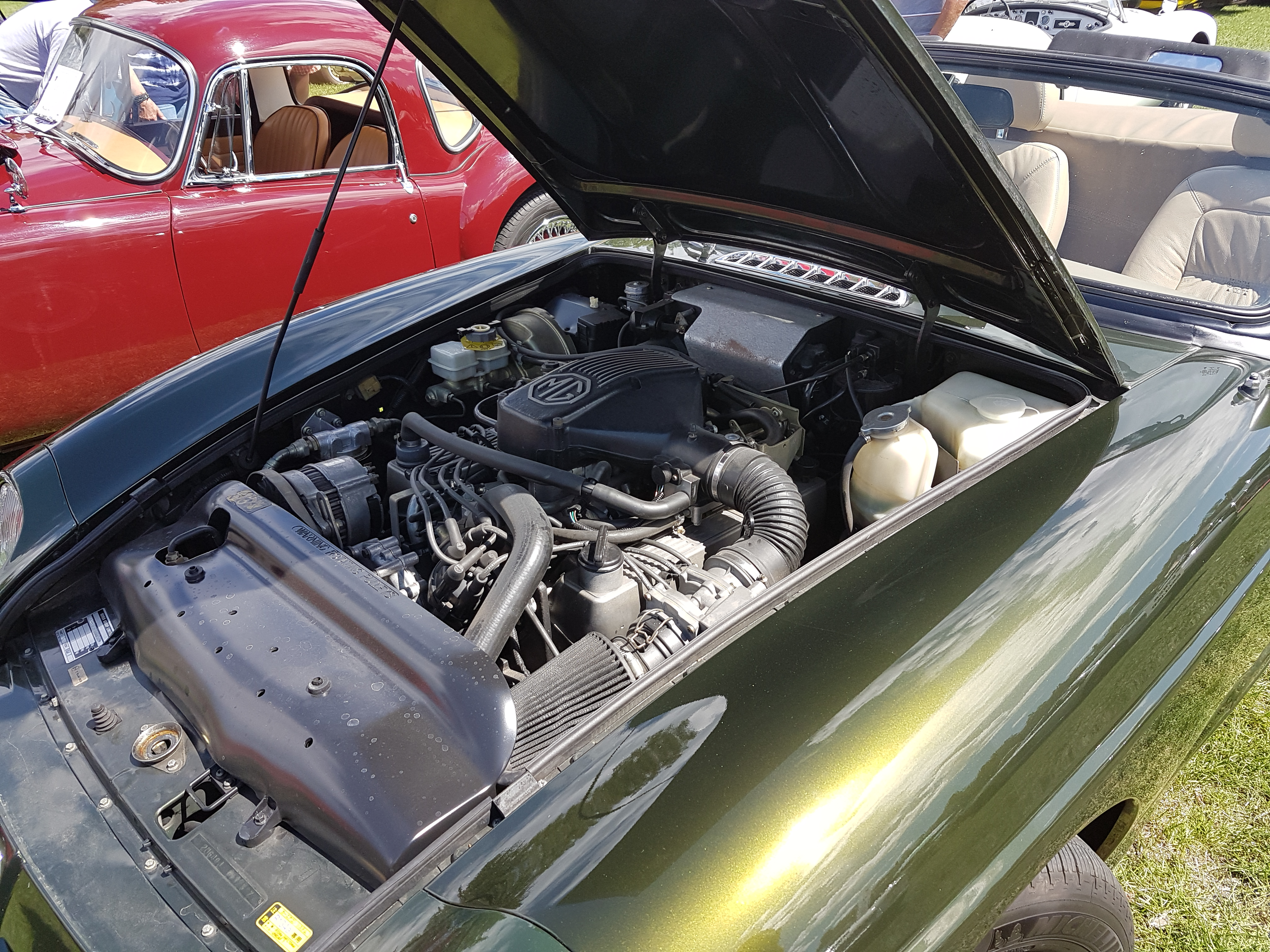
Engine bay

== Australian assembly ==
The MGB was assembled in Australia from 1963 to 1972, during which time approximately 9,000 were sold. The cars were assembled from complete knock down kits shipped from England. Initially, assembly was undertaken by the Pressed Metal Corporation at its Enfield facility, but was subsequently moved to BMC Australia’s Zetland plant in 1968. Australian assembly ended in 1972 when the government issued a requirement that, to enjoy favourable tariff treatment, locally produced cars should feature 85% local content. At the time, the local content of the Australian assembled MGBs was evaluated as just 45%. All MGBs assembled in Australia were roadsters.

== Motorsport ==
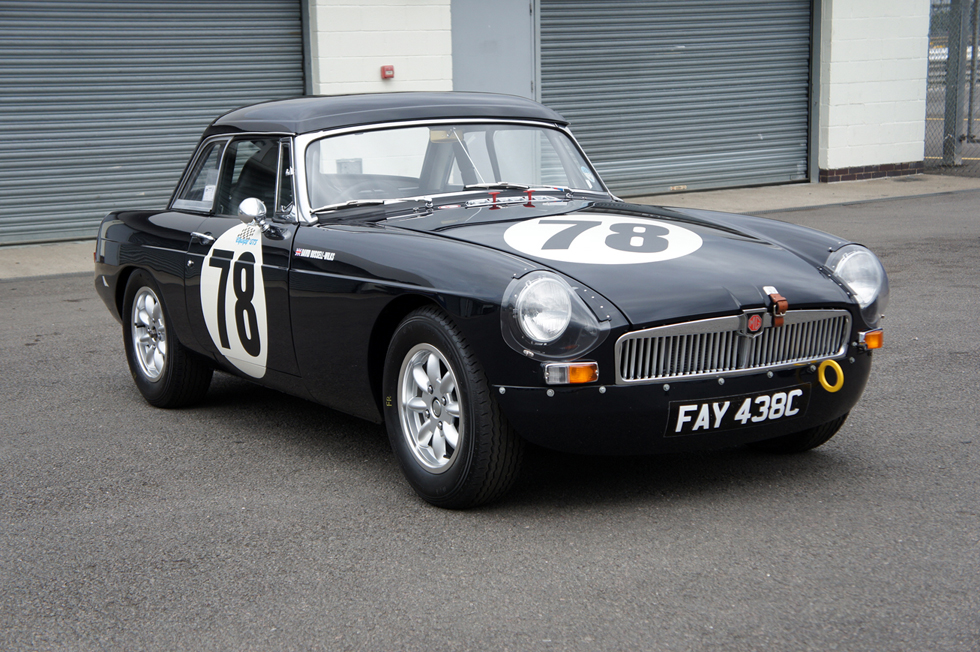
1965 MGB to FiA Appendix K Specification with period race modifications. Very similar to the cars that raced in the 1960s.

Specially tuned MGBs (including some with aluminium panels) were successful in international road competition events, scoring a Grand Touring category victory in the 1965 Monte Carlo Rally. Circuit racing wins included the Guards 1000 miles race at Brands Hatch in 1965 and the 84-hour Marathon de la Route at the Nürburgring in 1966. MGBs also won the GT Category in the 1966 Targa Florio, the 1966 Spa 1000 and the 1967 Spa 1000.
