= Lucien Bianchi =

Belgian racing driver (1934–1969)

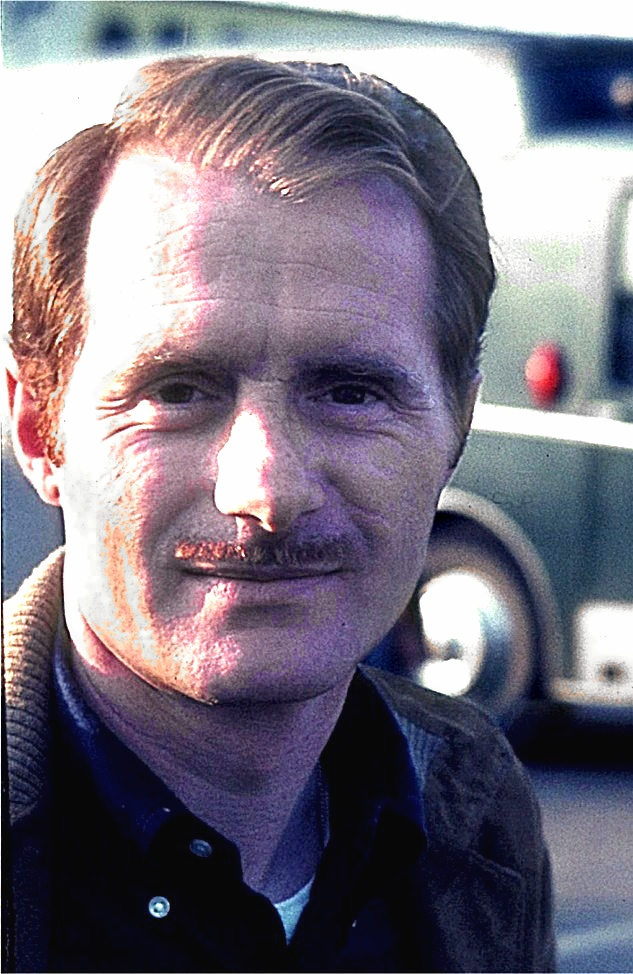
- Bianchi in 1968
- Born: Luciano Bianchi; 10 November 1934; Milan, Italy
- Died: 30 March 1969 (aged 34); Circuit de la Sarthe, Le Mans, France

Formula One World Championship career
- Nationality: (Belgium) Belgian
- Active years: 1959–1963, 1965, 1968
- Team(s): ENB, UDT Laystall, Reg Parnell, Scuderia Centro Sud, Cooper
- Entries: 19 (17 starts)
- Championships: 0
- Wins: 0
- Podiums: 1
- Career points: 6
- Pole positions: 0
- Fastest laps: 0
- First entry: 1959 Monaco Grand Prix
- Last entry: 1968 Mexican Grand Prix

Luciano "Lucien" Bianchi (Italian: [luˈtʃaːno ˈbjaŋki], French: [lysjɛ̃ bjɑ̃ki]; 10 November 1934 – 30 March 1969) was an Italian-born Belgian racing driver who raced for the Cooper, ENB, UDT Laystall and Scuderia Centro Sud teams in Formula One. He entered a total of 19 Formula One World Championship races, scoring six points and had a best finish of third at the 1968 Monaco Grand Prix.

Bianchi also drove in 13 consecutive 24 Hours of Le Mans (1956–1968), finishing first in Class three times, including the first overall win at the 1968 24 Hours of Le Mans, with co-driver Pedro Rodríguez. Bianchi died in a crash while testing for the 1969 24 Hours of Le Mans.

== Personal life ==
Bianchi was born in Milan, Italy, but moved to Belgium in 1946 with his father, who, before the Second World War, was a race mechanic working in the Alfa Romeo competition department. His brother, Mauro Bianchi, also became a racing driver. They drove to victory together in the 1965 Nürburgring 500 km. Mauro later won the P1.6 class at the 1967 24 Hours of Le Mans. His grandnephew, Jules Bianchi, who made his Formula One debut with the Marussia team for the 2013 season competing under the French flag, died in 2015, having never regained consciousness after a crash during the 2014 Japanese Grand Prix.

== Racing career ==
Bianchi's first race event was at the Alpine Rally in 1951. He won the 1957, 1958 and 1959 Tour de France as well as the Paris 1000 sports car race in the latter two years.

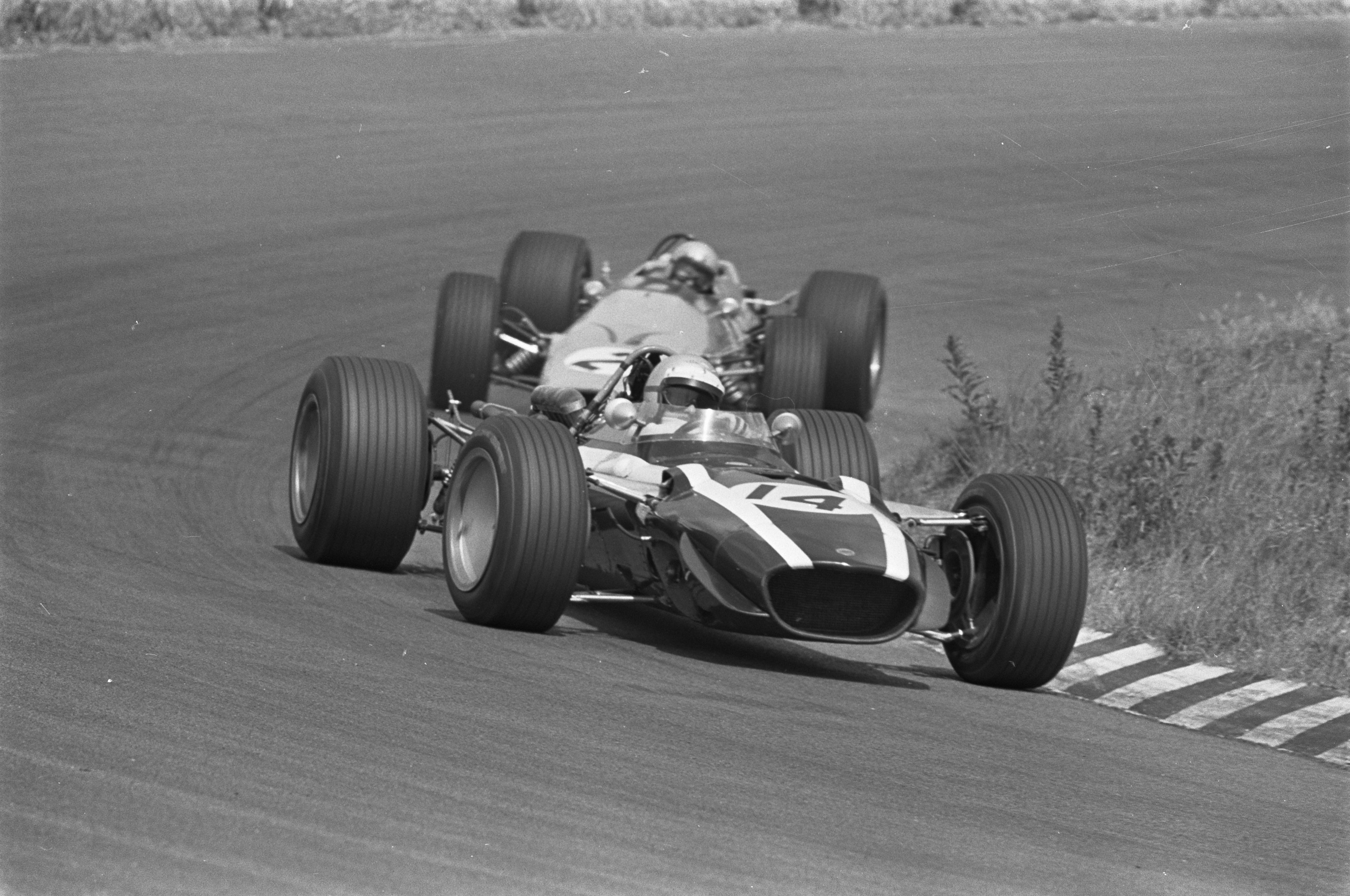
Bianchi driving for Cooper at the 1968 Dutch Grand Prix.

Bianchi entered Formula One in 1959, although only with sporadic appearances at first. He drove various cars under the banner of the ENB team, including a Cooper T51, a Lotus 18 and an Emeryson. After a couple of races for the UDT Laystall team in 1961, driving another Lotus, he returned to ENB for whom he drove their ENB-Maserati. He finally secured a more regular drive in Formula One in 1968, with the Cooper-BRM team, although success was elusive despite a bright start. Bianchi managed his best Formula One performance, finishing third at the 1968 Monaco Grand Prix, in his first race for Cooper.

Bianchi also raced touring cars, sports cars and rally cars, being successful in all disciplines, his biggest victories coming in the 1968 24 Hours of Le Mans, behind the wheel of a Ford GT40 with Pedro Rodríguez and at Sebring in 1962 with Jo Bonnier. He was also leading the 1968 London–Sydney Marathon when his Citroën DS collided with a non-competing car on the closed course near Nowra, 100 km south of Sydney.

Bianchi was killed when his Alfa Romeo T33 spun into a telegraph pole during Le Mans testing in 1969.

At Circuit Zolder, the fourth turn of the circuit, entering the back stretch, is named Lucien Bianchibocht in his memory.

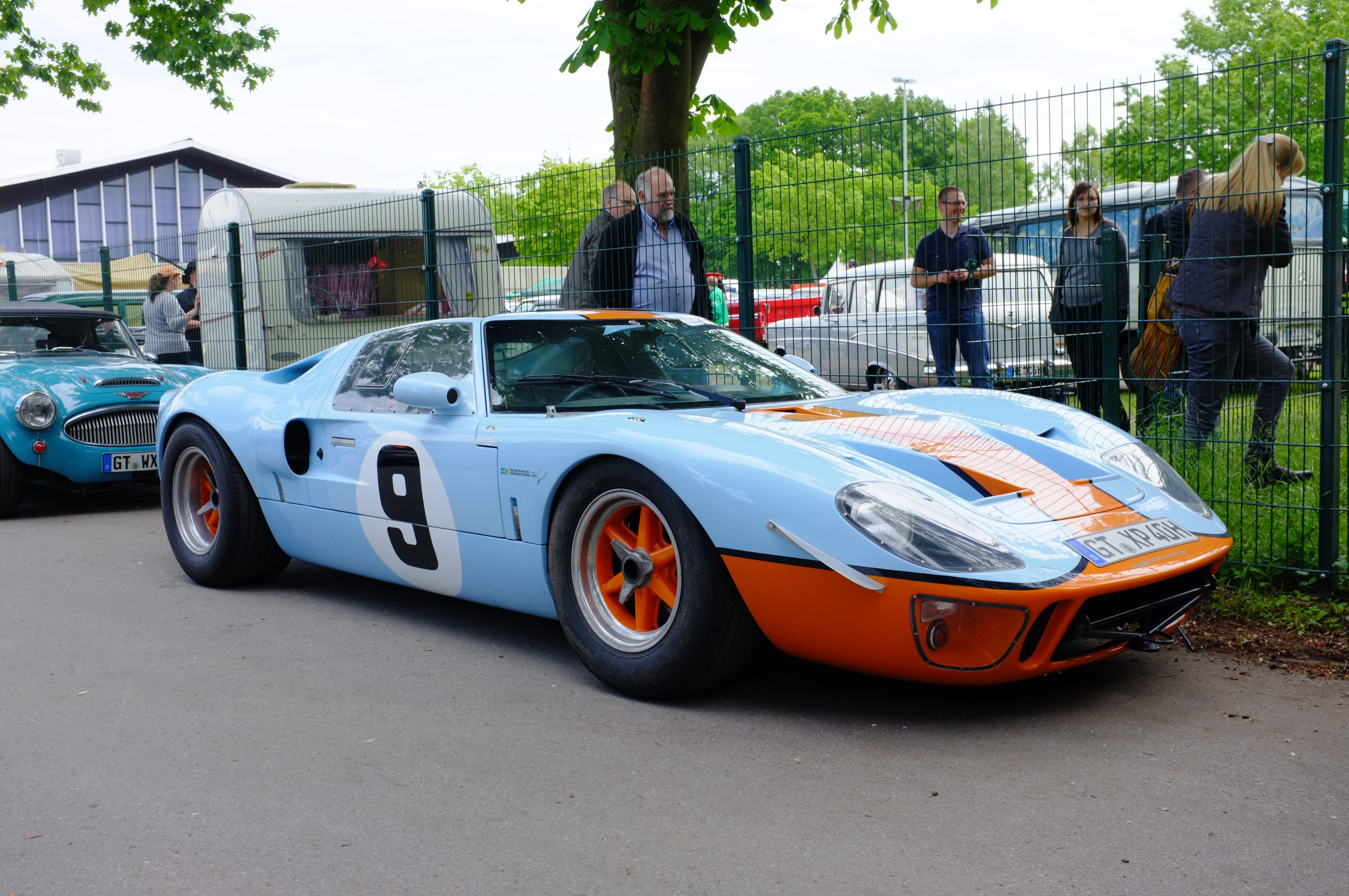
Replica of a Ford GT40 with the # 9 of Rodríguez and Bianchi winners of the 1968 24 Hours of Le Mans

== Racing record ==
=== Complete 24 Hours of Le Mans results ===
Year	Team	Co-Drivers	Car	Class	Laps	Pos.	Class Pos.
1956	(Belgium) Equipe Nationale Belge	(Belgium) Alain de Changy	Ferrari 500 TR	S 2.0	76	DNF	DNF
1957	(Belgium) Equipe Nationale Belge	(Belgium) Georges Harris	Ferrari 500 TRC	S 2.0	288	7th	**1st**
1958	(Belgium) Ecurie Francorchamps	(Belgium) Willy Mairesse	Ferrari 250 TR	S 3.0	33	DNF	DNF
1959	(Belgium) Equipe Nationale Belge	(Belgium) Alain de Changy	Ferrari 250 TR	S 3.0	47	DNF	DNF
1960	(Belgium) Equipe Nationale Belge	(Belgium) Jean Blaton	Ferrari 250 GT	GT 3.0	29	DNF	DNF
1961	(Belgium) Ecurie Francorchamps	(Belgium) Georges Berger	Ferrari 250 GT	GT 3.0	60	DNF	DNF
1962	Maserati France	(France) Maurice Trintignant	Maserati Tipo 151	E +3.0	152	DNF	DNF
1963	(United Kingdom) David Brown	(United States) Phil Hill	Aston Martin DP215	P+3.0	29	DNF	DNF
1964	(Belgium) Equipe Nationale Belge	(Belgium) Jean Blaton	Ferrari 250 GTO	GT 3.0	333	5th	**1st**
1965	(United Kingdom) Maranello Concessionaires Ltd.	(United Kingdom) Michael Salmon	Ferrari 250LM	P 5.0	99	DNF	DNF
1966	(United States) Holman & Moody	(United States) Mario Andretti	Ford GT40 Mk.II	P +5.0	97	DNF	DNF
1967	(United States) Holman & Moody	(United States) Mario Andretti	Ford GT40 Mk.IV	P +5.0	188	DNF	DNF
1968	(United Kingdom) J.W. Automotive Engineering Ltd.	(Mexico) Pedro Rodriguez	Ford GT40	S 5.0	331	**1st**	**1st**

=== Formula One World Championship results ===
(key)

Year	Entrant	Chassis	Engine	1	2	3	4	5	6	7	8	9	10	11	12	WDC	Pts
1959	Equipe National Belge	Cooper T51	Climax FPF 1.5 L4	MON; DNQ	500	NED	FRA	GBR	GER	POR	ITA	USA				NC	0
1960	Equipe National Belge	Cooper T51	Climax FPF 2.5 L4	ARG	MON	500	NED	BEL; 6								24th	1
1960	Fred Tuck Cars	Cooper T51	Climax FPF 2.5 L4						FRA; Ret	GBR; Ret	POR	ITA	USA			24th	1
1961	Equipe National Belge	Emeryson 61	Maserati Tipo 6 1.5 L4	MON; DNQ	NED											NC	0
1961	Equipe National Belge	Lotus 18	Climax FPF 1.5 L4			BEL; Ret										NC	0
1961	UDT Laystall Racing Team	Lotus 18/21	Climax FPF 1.5 L4				FRA; Ret	GBR; Ret	GER	ITA	USA					NC	0
1962	Equipe National Belge	Lotus 18/21	Climax FPF 1.5 L4	NED	MON	BEL; 9	FRA	GBR								NC	0
1962	Equipe National Belge	ENB F1	Maserati Tipo 6 1.5 L4						GER; 16	ITA	USA	RSA				NC	0
1963	Reg Parnell Racing	Lola Mk4	Climax FWMV 1.5 V8	MON	BEL; Ret	NED	FRA	GBR	GER	ITA	USA	MEX	RSA			NC	0
1965	Scuderia Centro Sud	BRM P57	BRM P56 1.5 V8	RSA	MON	BEL; 12	FRA	GBR	NED	GER	ITA	USA	MEX			NC	0
1968	Cooper Car Company	Cooper T86B	BRM P101 3.0 V12	RSA	ESP	MON; 3	BEL; 6	NED; Ret	FRA	GBR	GER; Ret	ITA	CAN; NC	USA; NC	MEX; Ret	17th	5

=== Complete 24 Hours of Spa results ===
Year	Team	Co-Drivers	Car	Class	Laps	Pos.	Class Pos.
1964	(Italy) Alfa Romeo Automobiles S.p.A	(Italy) Fernando Masoero	Alfa Romeo Giulia TI Super	C5	265	4th	1st
1966	(Italy) Autodelta S.p.A.	(Italy) Giancarlo Baghetti	Alfa Romeo 1600 GTA	T 1.6		DNF	DNF
1968	(Luxembourg) Alfa Romeo Benelux	(Belgium) Jean-Marie Lagae	Alfa Romeo 1750 Berlina	Gr. 1 2.5	250	17th	13th

=== Complete USAC Championship Car results ===
Year	Team	1	2	3	4	5	6	7	8	9	10	11	12	13	14	15	16	17	18	19	20	21	Pos	Points
1967	Jim Robbins	PHX; DNQ	TRE; 17	INDY; DNQ	MIL	LAN	PIP	MOS	MOS	IRP	LAN	MTR	MTR	SPR	MIL	DUQ	ISF	TRE	SAC	HAN	PHX	RIV	-	0

=== Complete British Saloon Car Championship results ===
(key) (Races in bold indicate pole position; races in italics indicate fastest lap.)

Year	Team	Car	Class	1	2	3	4	5	6	7	8	9	10	DC	Pts	Class
1967	Team Lotus	Ford Cortina Lotus	C	BRH	SNE	SIL	SIL	MAL	SIL	SIL; Ret	BRH	OUL	BRH	NC	0	NC

== Other race results ==
- Tour de France Automobile, 1st: 1957, 1958, 1959, 1964 / 2nd: 1961, 1963
- Spa 24 Hours, 1st: 1964 (in Class 5) overall 4th
- 12 hours of Sebring, 1st: 1962
- 12 Hours of Reims, 1st: 1965 (in class P1.3) overall 7th
- Targa Florio, 1st: 1965 (in class GT1.6) overall 7th
- 6 Hours of Nürburgring, 1st: 1965
- 6 Hours of Watkins Glen, 1st: 1968
- 1000 km of Nürburgring, 1st: 1965 (in class S.16) overall 13th, 1967 (in class P+2.0) overall 4th
- 1000 km of Paris, 1st: 1960 / 2nd: 1961, 1967
- Mugello Grand Prix, 1st: 1968
- 9 hours of Kyalami, 1st: 1968
- Grand Prix of Angola, 1st: 1962 / 2nd: 1964
- Grand Prix of Zolder, 1st: 1964
- 500 km of Nürburgring, 1st: 1965, 1963 (in class T1.0)
- Trophée d'Auvergne, 1st: 1963 (in class S/P+3.0)

Sporting positions
Preceded by Dan Gurney; A. J. Foyt	Winner of the 24 Hours of Le Mans; 1968; With: Pedro Rodríguez	Succeeded by Jacky Ickx; Jackie Oliver
