= British Motor Heritage =

British Motor Heritage Limited (BMH) is a British company specialising in the manufacture of bodies and body parts for historic and classic British cars, and based in Witney, Oxfordshire.

== History ==
BMH was established in 1975, as a subsidiary of British Leyland, to supply genuine components for classic British cars, using original tools wherever possible.

BMH started using legacy jigs and tools to produce complete bodyshells for historic models in 1988. It began production with its MG MGB replacement body, after the car had been out of production for 8 years. In 1991 it restarted production of MG Midget bodies.

BMW obtained BMH when it acquired the Rover Group in 1994

In 2001 BMW sold BMH back into private ownership, by which time it was also producing Triumph TR6 bodies. Later they added various Mini marques to their range, including the Clubman in 2004.

In 2013, the company employed over 40 staff, and had a turnover of almost £4 million, with an inventory worth £2 million.
