= Alain de Changy =

Belgian racing driver (1922–1994)

- Born: Alain Carpentier de Changy; 5 February 1922; Brussels, Belgium
- Died: 5 August 1994 (aged 72); Etterbeek, Belgium

Formula One World Championship career
- Nationality: (Belgium) Belgian
- Active years: 1959
- Team: Ecurie Nationale Belge
- Entries: 1 (0 starts)
- Championships: 0
- Wins: 0
- Podiums: 0
- Career points: 0
- Pole positions: 0
- Fastest laps: 0
- First entry: 1959 Monaco Grand Prix

Alain Carpentier de Changy (French pronunciation: [alɛ̃ kaʁpɑ̃tje d(ə) ʃɑ̃ʒi]; 5 February 1922 – 5 August 1994) was a racing driver from Belgium. His single Formula One World Championship Grand Prix attempt was at the 1959 Monaco Grand Prix with a Cooper run by Ecurie Nationale Belge, but he failed to qualify. He was more successful in sports car racing.

== Complete Formula One World Championship results ==
(key)

Year	Entrant	Chassis	Engine	1	2	3	4	5	6	7	8	9	WDC	Points
1959	Ecurie Nationale Belge	Cooper T51	Climax Straight-4	MON; DNQ	500	NED	FRA	GBR	GER	POR	ITA	USA	NC	0

== See also ==
- Carpentier family
