= List of Formula One constructors =

Formula One (F1) is the highest class of open-wheel racing defined by the Fédération Internationale de l'Automobile (FIA), motorsport's world governing body. The formula in the name alludes to a series of rules established by the FIA to which all participants and vehicles are required to conform. Constructors are people or corporate entities which design key parts of Formula One cars that have competed or are intended to compete in the FIA Formula One World Championship. Since 1981, it has been a requirement that each competitor must have the exclusive rights to the use of certain key parts of their car; in 2018, these parts were the survival cell, the front impact structure, the roll structures and bodywork.

Each year, the F1 World Championship season is held, consisting of a series of races, known as Grands Prix, held usually on purpose-built circuits, and in a few cases on closed city streets. Constructors are awarded points based on the finishing position of each of their two drivers at each Grand Prix, and the constructor who accumulates the most points over each championship is crowned that year's World Constructors' Champion. As of the 2026 São Paulo Grand Prix, there have been 174 Formula One constructors who have raced at least one of the 1,169 FIA World Championship races since the first such event, the 1950 British Grand Prix.

Ferrari holds the record for the most Constructors' and Drivers' Championships won with sixteen and fifteen, respectively. Ferrari also holds the record for the most wins by a constructor with 250, the most pole positions with 255, the most points with 11232, and the most podiums with 849. Ferrari has also entered more Grands Prix than any other constructor with 1144 entries and also maintains the record for the most Grand Prix starts with 1142. The most recent constructors to make their debut were Audi and Cadillac, who debuted at the 2026 Australian Grand Prix.

== Terminology ==
In Formula One racing the terms "constructor" and "entrant" have specific and differing meanings. An entrant is the person or corporate entity that registers a car and driver for a race, and is then responsible for preparing and maintaining that car during the race weekend. As a result of this preparation role and active involvement in the running of the race, the term "team" has become commonly applied to an entrant organisation. Statisticians do not always agree on how to count statistics related to these entities.

=== Constructors ===
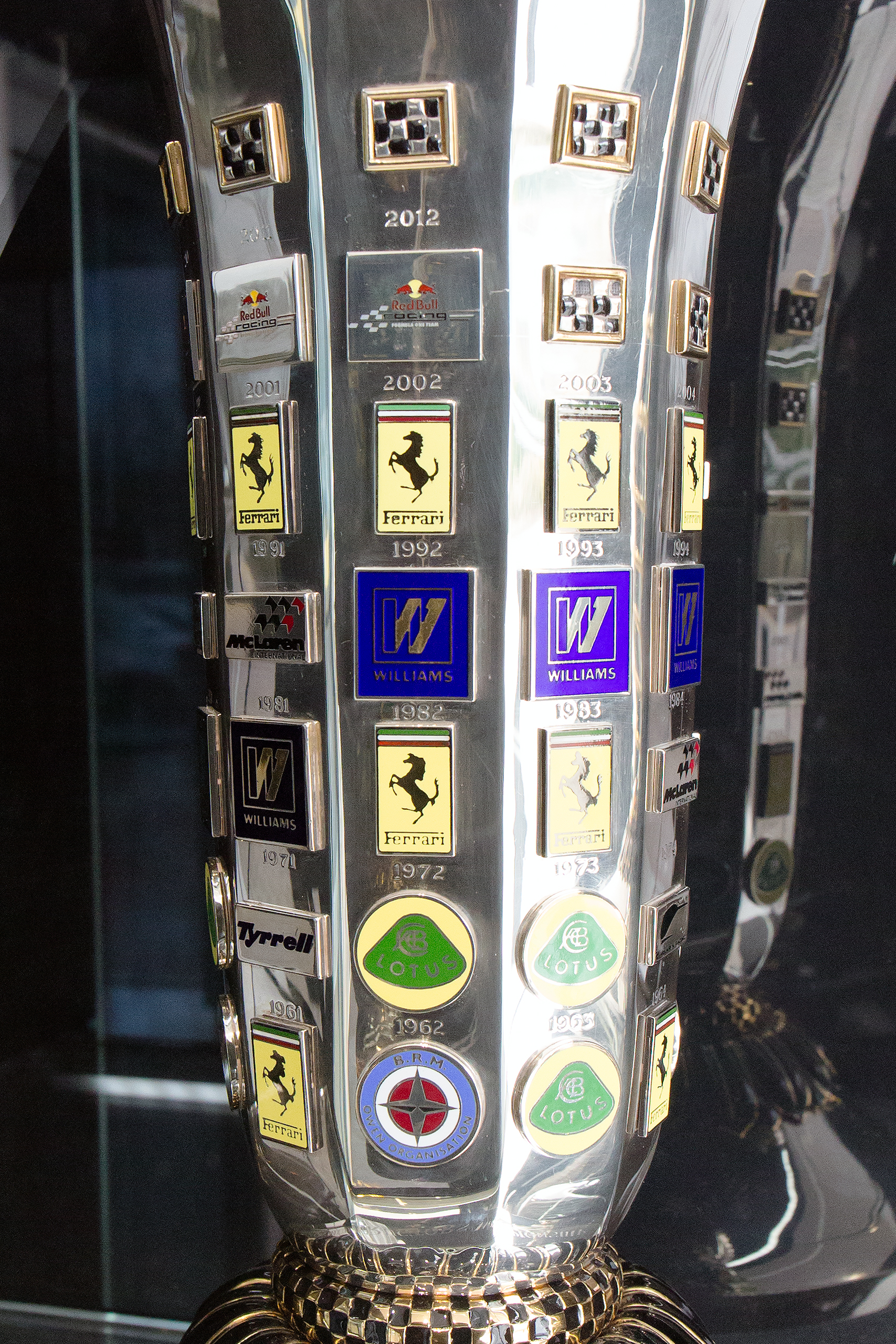
The Constructors' Championship trophy

Under Article 6.3 of the FIA Sporting Regulations, "A constructor is the person (including any corporate or unincorporated body) which designs the Listed Parts set out in Appendix 6. The make of an engine or chassis is the name attributed to it by its constructor." These "listed parts" include the survival cell, the front impact structure, the roll structures and bodywork. However, if the chassis and engine are made by different entities, the constructor comprises both (e.g. McLaren-Mercedes, Lotus-Climax etc.), with the name of the chassis constructor being placed before that of the engine constructor. As both chassis and engine are included in the constructor name, chassis run with different engines are counted as two separate constructors and score points separately. This occurred for the last time in the 1985 season when the Tyrrell team ran their chassis powered by both Ford and Renault engines, scored points with both engines and thus finishing 9th as Tyrrell-Ford and 10th as Tyrrell-Renault in the World Constructors' Championship.

Under article 6.2 of the FIA sporting regulations, "The title of Formula One World Champion Constructor will be awarded to the competitor which has scored the highest number of points". From the inaugural season of the World Constructors' Championship in 1958 up until the 1978 season only the highest-scoring driver in each race for each constructor contributed points towards the World Constructors' Championship (then officially as the International Cup for Formula One Constructors); since the 1979 season points from all cars entered by each constructor have counted towards their championship total.

=== Teams ===
Since the 1981 season the FIA have required that Formula One entrants own the intellectual rights to the chassis that they enter, and so the distinction between the terms "entrant" and "constructor", and hence also "team", have become less pronounced, though the intellectual rights of engines may still be owned by a different entity. (Note: The Equipe Banco Occidental team became the last privateer team to have entered a Williams car for a race alongside the Williams works team at the 1981 Spanish Grand Prix, but eventually withdrew before the practice and qualifying.) That season also saw the International Cup for Formula One Constructors be officially renamed to the World Constructors' Championship.

Before this time, constructors were free to sell their chassis to as many other teams as they liked. Brabham and Lotus chassis were used extensively by other teams during the 1960s and 1970s and several quite competitive privateer teams never built their own chassis. Rob Walker Racing Team was the most successful example, being responsible for the first victories in Formula One for both Cooper and Lotus. The concept of a "works" or "factory" team (i.e. the official team of the company producing the cars, as opposed to a customer team which buys them off the shelf) therefore applied to chassis in the same way as it does in rallying and sports car racing.

There have been some recent exceptions where a specialist company, not itself entered in the championship, has been commissioned to design and build a chassis for a team, e.g. Lola built cars for the Larrousse team (1987–1991) and the Scuderia Italia team (1993) and Dallara built cars for the Scuderia Italia team (1988–1992). Larousse had their points from the 1990 season erased after the FIA decided that they had falsely nominated themselves and not Lola as the chassis constructor. In 1978, the new Arrows team which had been established by former Shadow personnel was sued by Shadow on the grounds that the Arrows FA/1 car was a copy of Shadow's DN9 – a view upheld by the UK High Court, which placed a ban on Arrows racing the FA/1. There have been more recent cases with Ligier (1995), Sauber (2004), Scuderia Toro Rosso (2006–2007) and Super Aguri (2007–2008) where teams have been accused of using a chassis produced by another constructor (respectively Benetton, Ferrari, Red Bull Racing and Honda). No action was taken against any of these teams, the sporting authorities being satisfied in each case that the team owned the intellectual property to the chassis they raced.

From the middle of the 1973 season (the 1973 Belgian Grand Prix) until the end of the 2013 season, each team had permanent racing numbers from race to race throughout the season. For the 1974 season the numbers were based on the teams' finishing positions in the 1973 Constructors' Championship. At the start of each subsequent season until 1995, the team which had used numbers 1 and 2 in the previous season exchanged numbers with the team having the driver who had won the World Drivers' Championship in the previous season; this driver was given number 1. Other teams retained the numbers that they had used in the previous season. New teams were given vacant numbers. This general rule underwent slight modifications, e.g. Ferrari's traditional numbers were 11–12 until 1980 and 27–28 from 1981 onwards. Between 1996 and 2013 the numbers were based on the teams' finishing positions in the Constructors' Championship from the previous season, with numbers 1 and 2 assigned to the defending champion and his teammate. During the period of 1974–1995 Tyrrell was the only team to keep the same numbers (3 and 4) every season. Since 2014, racing numbers have been assigned to drivers instead of teams.

The number of cars entered by one team into a single race was not strictly limited in the 1950s and early 1960s. Since the 1963 season teams were generally allowed to enter only two regular cars, with the third car reserved for an occasional driver. This rule was further promoted in the 1974 season when the permanent racing numbers were assigned to each team in pairs, with the third car having the racing number out of the pair. Entering more than three cars was exceptionally tolerated, most notably regarding the BRM team in the 1971 and 1972 seasons. However, many teams during this period entered only two cars, e.g. Ferrari have entered no more than two cars (with one exception at the 1976 Italian Grand Prix in connection with Lauda's comeback) every season since 1973. Since the 1985 season the FIA have required that teams enter no more than two cars for a race; during this season Renault became the last team to have entered three cars for a race at the 1985 German Grand Prix, but only two of their cars were eligible for championship points.

==== Team's nationality ====
Unlike drivers who are required to compete in the FIA Formula One World Championship under the nationality of their passport and in case of a multiple citizenship they can choose their "official" nationality, the FIA's International Sporting Code states that teams competing in the FIA Formula One World Championship shall compete under the nationality of their parent National Sporting Authority (ASN) that issued their FIA racing licence. On the basis of this regulation, despite the fact that most current teams are based in the UK, only the teams licensed by the British ASN—Aston Martin, Williams, and McLaren—represent the UK in Formula One.

Teams take the nationality of their parent ASN that issued their licence for the period of validity of that licence and the change of the nationality is allowed. In the 1976 season the Shadow team became the first Formula One team to have officially changed its nationality after switching from an American racing licence to a British one. Several other teams followed this example and changed their nationality during their competition in Formula One as well, some of them even twice (e.g. Benetton in 1996 from British to Italian, Red Bull in 2007 from British to Austrian, Renault in 2011 from French to British and in 2016 back to French). At the 1997 German Grand Prix Benetton became the only team to have achieved victories while racing under two nationalities. The team's nationality, determined by a racing licence that a team holds (and not by a team's base nor by a team's ownership), subsequently determines a national anthem played after a race on the podium in honour of a winning team following a national anthem played in honour of a winning driver, e.g. both in 2000 and 2001 Benetton was owned by the French company Renault and was based in Britain, yet in case of win an Italian anthem would have been played for a winning team because the French-owned British-based team held an Italian licence in both seasons.

Before the arrival of sponsorship liveries in the 1968 season the team's nationality also determined the colour of a car entered by the team; thus, Italian teams' cars were rosso corsa red, French were bleu de France blue, and British (with several exceptions, such as cars entered by teams Rob Walker, Brabham and McLaren) were British racing green. Since the licence is given to a team and not to a constructor, privateer teams entering cars built by constructors from another country before the 1968 season painted cars in the national colour of their home country, e.g. the French Guy Ligier's privateer team entered cars painted in bleu de France blue in 1966 and 1967 seasons despite the fact that they were built by the British constructor Cooper.

The fact that most teams are based in the UK has led to several mistakes occurred on official entry lists issued by or podium ceremonies organized by the FIA or race organisers, e.g. Wolf racing under a Canadian licence, and Shadow (in 1973) and Penske, both holding American licences, were all identified as British teams by official entry lists; the British national anthem was also played on the podium in honour of the Irish-licensed Jordan team and the Austrian-licensed Red Bull team when they achieved their maiden victories at the 1998 Belgian Grand Prix and 2009 Chinese Grand Prix respectively.

== Constructors for the 2026 season ==
Correct as of the 2026 São Paulo Grand Prix

Note: Until 1965 a works team of every constructor was licensed in the country where it was in fact based. In 1965 Japanese-licensed Honda moved their works team from Tokyo, Japan to Amsterdam, Netherlands, followed in 1966 by the American-licensed Anglo American Racers team which was based in Rye, East Sussex, United Kingdom. Since the early 2000s most teams have been based in the United Kingdom, and either licensed there or in another country, with the rest based in Italy (Maranello and Faenza), Switzerland (Hinwil), and the United States (Kannapolis).

Key: Licensed in = Country in which the works team of respective constructor is licensed; Races Entered = Number of individual races entered; Races Started = Number of individual races started; Drivers = Number of drivers; Total Entries = Total number of race entries; Wins = Number of races won; Points = Number of World Constructors' Championship points scored; Poles = Number of pole positions; FL = Number of fastest laps; Podiums = Number of podium finishes; WCC = World Constructors' Championships won; WDC = World Drivers' Championships won.

Constructor	Engine	Licensed in	Based in	Seasons	Races entered	Races started	Drivers	Total entries	Wins	Points	Poles	FL	Podiums	WCC	WDC	Antecedent teams
Alpine	Mercedes	France	United Kingdom	2021–present	134	134	5	268	1	604	1	1	6	0	0	(United Kingdom) Toleman (1981–1985), (United Kingdom) / (Italy) Benetton (1986–2001), (France) / (United Kingdom) Renault (2002–2011, 2016–2020), (United Kingdom) Lotus (2012–2015)
Aston Martin	Honda	United Kingdom	United Kingdom	1959–1960, 2021–present	140	139	7	279	0	602	0	3	9	0	0	(Republic of Ireland) Jordan (1991–2005), (Russia) Midland (2006), (Netherlands) Spyker (2007), Force India (2008–2018), (United Kingdom) Force India (2018), (United Kingdom) Racing Point (2019–2020)
Audi	Audi	Germany	Switzerland; United Kingdom; Germany	2026–present	20	20	2	40	0	28	0	0	0	0	0	(Switzerland) Sauber (1993–2005, 2011–2018), (Germany) / (Switzerland) BMW Sauber (2006–2010), (Switzerland) Alfa Romeo (2019–2023) (Switzerland) Kick Sauber (2024–2025)
Cadillac	Ferrari	United States	United States; United Kingdom	2026–present	20	20	2	40	0	0	0	0	0	0	0	—
Ferrari	Ferrari	Italy	Italy	1950–present	1144	1142	83	2414	250	11232	255	271	849	16	15	—
Haas	Ferrari	United States	United States; United Kingdom; Italy	2016–present	234	234	11	468	0	417	1	3	0	0	0	—
McLaren	Mercedes	United Kingdom	United Kingdom	1966–present	1018	1013	52	2105	206	8187.5	181	185	566	10	13	—
Mercedes	Mercedes	Germany	United Kingdom (Note: Between 1954–1955 based in Germany.)	1954–1955, 2010–present	361	361	13	734	143	8801.5	155	125	334	9	10	(United Kingdom) Tyrrell (1970–1998), (United Kingdom) BAR (1999–2005), (Japan) Honda (2006–2008), (United Kingdom) Brawn (2009)
Racing Bulls	Red Bull Ford	Italy	Italy; United Kingdom	2024–present	68	68	5	136	0	252	0	1	1	0	0	(Italy) Minardi (1985–2005), (Italy) Toro Rosso (2006–2019) (Italy) AlphaTauri (2020–2023)
Red Bull Racing	Red Bull Ford	Austria (Note: Red Bull had a British licence in 2005 and 2006.)	United Kingdom	2005–present	438	437	14	876	133	8703	113	104	312	6	8	(United Kingdom) Stewart (1997–1999), (United Kingdom) Jaguar (2000–2004)
Williams	Mercedes	United Kingdom	United Kingdom	1978–present	871	870	49	1659	114	3786	128	134	315	9	7	—

== Former constructors ==
Key: Licensed in = Country in which the works team of respective constructor was licensed; Races Entered = Number of individual races entered; Races Started = Number of individual races started; Drivers = Number of drivers; Total Entries = Total number of race entries; Wins = Number of races won; Points = Number of Constructors' Championship points scored; Poles = Number of pole positions; FL = Number of fastest laps; Podiums. = Number of podium finishes; WCC = Constructors' Championships won; WDC = Drivers' Championships won.

Constructor	Licensed in	Seasons	Races Entered	Races Started	Drivers	Total Entries	Wins	Points	Poles	FL	Podiums	WCC	WDC
Alex von Falkenhausen Motorenbau	West Germany	1952–1953 (Note: In 1949 and 1950, AFM participated in the German Formula 2 championship.)	4	4	5	7	0	n/a	0	0	0	n/a	0
Automobiles Gonfaronnaises Sportives (AGS)	France	1986–1991	80	48	10	124	0	2	0	0	0	0	0
Alfa Romeo	Italy, Switzerland (Note: From 1950 to 1951 and from 1979–1985 Alfa Romeo had an Italian licence; from 2019 to 2023, they carried a Swiss one due to being operated under Sauber Motorsport's guise.)	1950–1951, 1979–1985, 2019–2023	214	214	23	443	10	199	12	16	26	0	2
Alfa Special (Note: Peter de Klerk contested the 1963 and 1965 South African Grands Prix in a home-built "Alfa Special")	South Africa	1963, 1965	2	2	1	2	0	0	0	0	0	0	0
AlphaTauri	Italy	2020–2023	83	83	6	166	1	309	0	2	2	0	0
Alta	United Kingdom	1950–1952 (Note: From 1950 to 1959, Alta was also an engine manufacturer for teams HWM, Cooper and Connaught.)	5	5	4	6	0	n/a	0	0	0	n/a	0
Amon	New Zealand	1974	4	1	2	4	0	0	0	0	0	0	0
Andrea Moda	Italy	1992	12	1	4	15	0	0	0	0	0	0	0
Apollon	Switzerland	1977	5	1	1	1	0	0	0	0	0	0	0
Arrows (Note: Arrows were known as Footwork from 1991 to 1996.)	United Kingdom	1978–2002	394	383	36	783	0	167	1	0	8	0	0
Arzani-Volpini	Italy	1955	1	0	1	1	0	n/a	0	0	0	n/a	0
Aston Butterworth	United Kingdom	1952	4	1	2	4	0	n/a	0	0	0	n/a	0
Automobili Turismo e Sport	Italy	1963 (Note: In 1964 and 1967, ATS was an engine manufacturer for teams Derrington-Francis and Cooper, racing at the 1964 Italian and 1967 British Grands Prix with Mário de Araújo Cabral and Silvio Moser.)	6	6	3	11	0	0	0	0	0	0	0
Auto Technisches Spezialzubehör (ATS)	West Germany	1977–1984	107	89	15	146	0	7	0	0	0	0	0
British American Racing (Note: BAR formerly Tyrrell; subsequently became Honda, then Brawn, then Mercedes.)	United Kingdom	1999–2005	118	116	7	236	0	227	2	0	15	0	0
Behra-Porsche	West Germany	1959–1960	4	2	4	4	0	0	0	0	0	0	0
Bellasi	Switzerland	1970–1971	6	2	1	6	0	0	0	0	0	0	0
Benetton (Note: Benetton formerly Toleman; subsequently became Renault, then Lotus F1 then Renault again, then Alpine.)	United Kingdom, Italy (Note: From 1986 to 1995 Benetton had a British licence; from 1996 to 2001, an Italian one.)	1986–2001	260	260	17	520	27	851.5	15	36	102	1	2
Boro	Netherlands	1976–1977	8	6	4	8	0	0	0	0	0	0	0
Brabham	United Kingdom	1962–1987, 1989–1992	403	394	39	995	35	843	39	41	124	2	4
Brawn GP	United Kingdom	2009	17	17	2	34	8	172	5	4	15	1	1
British Racing Motors	United Kingdom	1951, 1956–1977	208	197	71	559	17	385	11	15	61	1	1
British Racing Partnership	United Kingdom	1963–1964	13	13	2	19	0	11	0	0	0	0	0
Bugatti	France	1956	1	1	1	1	0	n/a	0	0	0	n/a	0
Caterham	Malaysia	2012–2014	56	56	8	112	0	0	0	0	0	0	0
Cisitalia	Italy	1952	1	0	1	1	0	n/a	0	0	0	n/a	0
Coloni (Note: Coloni subsequently became Andrea Moda.)	Italy	1987–1991	65	13	8	81	0	0	0	0	0	0	0
Connaught	United Kingdom	1952–1959	18	17	29	52	0	0	0	0	1	0	0
Connew	United Kingdom	1972	2	1	1	2	0	0	0	0	0	0	0
Cooper Car Company	United Kingdom	1950, 1952–1969	129	129	111	528	16	301	11	14	58	2	2
Dallara	Italy	1988–1992	80	78	6	144	0	15	0	0	2	0	0
De Tomaso	Italy	1961–1963, 1970	15	10	8	18	0	0	0	0	0	0	0
Eagle (Anglo American Racers)	United States	1966–1969	26	26	7	35	1	17	0	2	2	0	0
Eifelland	West Germany	1972	8	8	1	8	0	0	0	0	0	0	0
Emeryson	United Kingdom	1956, 1961–1962	6	4	6	7	0	0	0	0	0	0	0
Eisenacher Motorenwerk	East Germany	1953	1	1	1	1	0	n/a	0	0	0	n/a	0
Ecurie Nationale Belge	Belgium	1962	1	1	1	1	0	0	0	0	0	0	0
Ensign	United Kingdom	1973–1982	134	98	25	154	0	19	0	1	0	0	0
English Racing Automobiles	United Kingdom	1950–1952	7	7	7	12	0	n/a	0	0	0	n/a	0
EuroBrun	Italy	1988–1990	46	15	5	76	0	0	0	0	0	0	0
Ferguson Research Ltd.	United Kingdom	1961	1	1	2	1	0	0	0	0	0	0	0
FIRST	Italy	1989	1	0	0	0	0	0	0	0	0	0	0
Fittipaldi Automotive (Copersucar)	Brazil	1975–1982	120	103	8	156	0	44	0	0	3	0	0
Fondmetal	Italy	1991–1992	29	19	4	42	0	0	0	0	0	0	0
Force India (Note: Force India formerly Jordan, Midland and Spyker; subsequently became Racing Point Force India, then Racing Point, then Aston Martin.) (Sahara)	India	2008–2018	203	203	7	406	0	987	1	5	6	0	0
Forti	Italy	1995–1996	28	23	4	54	0	0	0	0	0	0	0
Frank Williams Racing Cars (Note: Frank Williams Racing Cars includes Politoys (1972), Iso-Marlboro (1973–1974) and Wolf-Williams (1976) cars. Prior to 1972 FWRC ran customer chassis. Subsequently became Wolf. Williams Grand Prix Engineering was a new constructor established by Frank Williams and Patrick Head after Williams left Wolf-Williams.)	United Kingdom	1972–1976	61	56	25	112	0	6	0	0	0	0	0
Frazer-Nash	United Kingdom	1952	4	4	2	4	0	n/a	0	0	0	n/a	0
Fry	United Kingdom	1959	1	0	1	1	0	0	0	0	0	0	0
Gilby Engineering	United Kingdom	1961–1963	6	3	2	6	0	0	0	0	0	0	0
Gordini	France	1952–1956	33	33	23	101	0	n/a	0	1	2	n/a	0
Greifzu	East Germany	1953	1	1	1	1	0	n/a	0	0	0	n/a	0
Hesketh	United Kingdom	1974–1978	60	52	15	97	1	48	0	1	7	0	0
Hill	United Kingdom	1975	11	10	6	21	0	3	0	0	0	0	0
HRT (Hispania Racing Team)	Spain	2010–2012	58	56	8	116	0	0	0	0	0	0	0
Honda	Japan	1964–1968, 2006–2008	88	88	8	154	3	154	2	2	9	0	0
HWM (Hersham and Walton Motors)	United Kingdom	1951–1955	16	14	15	48	0	n/a	0	0	0	n/a	0
Jaguar (Note: Jaguar formerly Stewart Grand Prix. Subsequently became Red Bull Racing.)	United Kingdom	2000–2004	85	85	8	170	0	49	0	0	2	0	0
JBW	United Kingdom	1959–1961	6	5	1	6	0	0	0	0	0	0	0
Jordan (Note: Jordan subsequently became Midland F1 Racing, then Spyker, then Force India, then Racing Point Force India, then Racing Point, then Aston Martin.)	Ireland	1991–2005	250	250	30	500	4	291	2	2	19	0	0
Kauhsen	West Germany	1979	2	0	1	2	0	0	0	0	0	0	0
Klenk	West Germany	1954	1	1	1	1	0	n/a	0	0	0	n/a	0
Kojima	Japan	1976–1977	2	2	3	3	0	0	0	0	0	0	0
Kurtis Kraft	United States	1950–1960	12	12	129	350	5	0	6	7	16	0	0
Lambo (Modena Team)	Italy	1991	16	6	2	32	0	0	0	0	0	0	0
Lancia	Italy	1954–1955	4	4	4	10	0	n/a	2	1	1	n/a	0
Larrousse	France	1993–1994	32	32	7	64	0	5	0	0	0	0	0
LDS	South Africa	1962–1963, 1965, 1967–1968	5	5	3	8	0	0	0	0	0	0	0
LEC	United Kingdom	1977	5	3	1	5	0	0	0	0	0	0	0
Leyton House (Note: Leyton House formerly March Engineering.)	United Kingdom	1990–1991	32	30	3	64	0	8	0	0	1	0	0
Life	Italy	1990	14	0	2	14	0	0	0	0	0	0	0
Ligier/Talbot Ligier (Note: From 1981 to 1982 as Talbot Ligier; subsequently became Prost Grand Prix.)	France	1976–1996	332	326	28	612	9	388	9	10	50	0	0
Lola (Note: Lola includes Larrousse (1990) and MasterCard Lola (1997) entries.)	United Kingdom	1962–1963, 1967–1968, 1974–1975, 1985–1991, 1993, 1997	152	146	27	280	0	45	1	0	3	0	0
Lotus (1958–1994)	United Kingdom	1958–1994	491	489	122	1332	79	1332	107	70	172	7	6
Lotus (2010–2011)	Malaysia	2010–2011	38	38	3	76	0	0	0	0	0	0	0
Lotus (2012–2015)	United Kingdom	2012–2015	77	77	5	154	2	706	0	5	25	0	0
Lyncar	United Kingdom	1974–1975	2	1	1	2	0	0	0	0	0	0	0
Maki	Japan	1974–1976	8	0	3	8	0	0	0	0	0	0	0
Manor	United Kingdom	2016	21	21	3	42	0	1	0	0	0	0	0
March (Note: March subsequently became Leyton House Racing, later reappearing as March for one final season.)	United Kingdom	1970–1977, 1981–1982, 1987–1989, 1992	208	197	54	579	3	172.5	5	7	21	0	0
Martini	France	1978	9	4	1	7	0	0	0	0	0	0	0
Marussia (Note: Marussia formerly Virgin Racing, subsequently became Manor Racing.)	Russia, United Kingdom (Note: From 2012 to 2014 Marussia had a Russian licence; in 2015 a British one.)	2012–2015	74	73	7	144	0	2	0	0	0	0	0
Maserati	Italy	1950–1960	77	70	106	423	9	9	10	15	37	0	2
Matra	France	1967–1972	61	61	5	117	9	163	4	12	21	1	1
MBM	Switzerland	1961	1	0	1	1	0	0	0	0	0	0	0
McGuire	Australia	1977	1	0	1	1	0	0	0	0	0	0	0
Merzario	Italy	1978–1979	31	10	3	32	0	0	0	0	0	0	0
Midland (Note: Midland formerly Jordan Grand Prix; subsequently became Spyker F1, then Force India, then Racing Point Force India, then Racing Point, then Aston Martin.)	Russia	2006	18	18	2	36	0	0	0	0	0	0	0
Milano	Italy	1950	1	0	1	1	0	n/a	0	0	0	n/a	0
Minardi (Note: Minardi subsequently became Scuderia Toro Rosso, then AlphaTauri.)	Italy	1985–2005	346	340	42	676	0	38	0	0	0	0	0
Onyx	United Kingdom	1989–1990	26	17	6	52	0	6	0	0	1	0	0
O.S.C.A.	Italy	1951–1953, 1958	7	4	5	11	0	0	0	0	0	0	
Osella (Note: Osella subsequently became Fondmetal.)	Italy	1980–1990	172	132	17	253	0	5	0	0	0	0	0
Pacific	United Kingdom	1994–1995	33	22	5	66	0	0	0	0	0	0	0
Parnelli	United States	1974–1976	16	16	1	16	0	6	0	1	0	0	0
Penske	United States	1974–1977	41	40	7	46	1	23	0	0	3	0	0
Porsche	West Germany	1957–1964	36	33	13	75	1	46	1	0	5	0	0
Prost (Note: Prost formerly Ligier.)	France	1997–2001	83	83	9	166	0	35	0	0	3	0	0
RAM	United Kingdom	1983–1985	44	31	8	73	0	0	0	0	0	0	0
Racing Point Force India (Note: Racing Point Force India formerly Jordan, Midland, Spyker and Force India; subsequently became Racing Point, then Aston Martin.)	United Kingdom	2018	9	9	2	18	0	52	0	0	0	0	0
Racing Point (Note: Racing Point formerly Jordan, Midland, Spyker, Force India and Racing Point Force India; subsequently became Aston Martin.)	United Kingdom	2019–2020	38	38	3	76	1	268	1	0	4	0	0
RE	Rhodesia	1965	1	0	1	1	0	0	0	0	0	0	0
Renault	France, United Kingdom (Note: Renault had a British licence in 2011.)	1977–1985, 2002–2011, 2016–2020	403	400	26	788	35	1777	51	33	103	2	2
Rebaque	Mexico	1979	3	1	1	3	0	0	0	0	0	0	0
Rial	West Germany	1988–1989	32	21	6	48	0	6	0	0	0	0	0
Sauber/ BMW Sauber/ Kick Sauber (Note: From 1993 to 2005 and from 2011 to 2018 as Sauber; from 2006 to 2010 as BMW Sauber; from 2024 to 2025 as Kick Sauber.)	Switzerland; Germany (Note: From 1993 to 2005, from 2010 to 2018 and from 2024 to 2025 Sauber had a Swiss licence (in 2010 as BMW Sauber and from 2024 to 2025 as Kick Sauber); from 2006 to 2009, a German one (as BMW Sauber).)	1993–2018, 2024–2025	513	510	34	998	1	939	1	5	27	0	0
Scarab	United States	1960	5	2	4	10	0	0	0	0	0	0	0
Scirocco	United Kingdom	1963–1964	7	5	3	9	0	0	0	0	0	0	0
Shadow	United States, United Kingdom (Note: From 1973 to 1975 Shadow had an American licence; from 1976 to 1980, a British one.)	1973–1980	112	103	21	240	1	67.5	3	2	7	0	0
Shannon	United Kingdom	1966	1	1	1	1	0	0	0	0	0	0	0
Simca-Gordini	France	1950–1953	15	14	11	29	0	n/a	0	0	0	n/a	0
Simtek	United Kingdom	1994–1995	21	21	7	40	0	0	0	0	0	0	0
Spirit	United Kingdom	1983–1985	25	23	3	25	0	0	0	0	0	0	0
Spyker (Note: Spyker formerly Jordan Grand Prix and Midland F1 Racing; subsequently became Force India, then Racing Point Force India, then Racing Point, then Aston Martin.)	Netherlands	2007	17	17	4	34	0	1	0	0	0	0	0
Stebro	Canada	1963	1	1	1	1	0	0	0	0	0	0	0
Stewart (Note: Stewart subsequently became Jaguar Racing.)	United Kingdom	1997–1999	49	49	4	98	1	47	1	0	5	0	0
Super Aguri	Japan	2006–2008	39	39	5	39	0	4	0	0	0	0	0
Surtees	United Kingdom	1970–1978	119	118	38	260	0	53	0	3	2	0	0
SVA	Italy	1950	1	0	1	1	0	n/a	0	0	0	n/a	0
Talbot	France	1950	1	1	2	2	0	n/a	0	0	0	n/a	0
Talbot-Lago	France	1950–1951	13	13	18	81	0	n/a	0	0	2	n/a	0
Tec-Mec	United States	1959	1	1	1	1	0	0	0	0	0	0	0
Tecno	Italy	1972–1973	12	10	3	14	0	1	0	0	0	0	0
Theodore	Hong Kong	1978, 1981–1983	51	34	10	64	0	2	0	0	0	0	0
Token	United Kingdom	1974	4	3	3	4	0	0	0	0	0	0	0
Toleman (Note: Toleman subsequently became Benetton Formula.)	United Kingdom	1981–1985	70	53	9	131	0	26	1	2	3	0	0
Toro Rosso (Note: Scuderia Toro Rosso formerly Minardi; subsequently became AlphaTauri.)	Italy	2006–2019	268	268	14	536	1	500	1	1	3	0	0
Toyota	Japan	2002–2009	140	139	9	276	0	278.5	3	3	13	0	0
Trojan	United Kingdom	1974	8	6	1	8	0	0	0	0	0	0	0
Tyrrell (Note: Tyrrell subsequently became British American Racing.)	United Kingdom	1970–1998	433	430	47	884	23	617	14	20	77	1	2
Vanwall	United Kingdom	1954–1960	29	28	12	66	9	48	7	6	13	1	0
Venturi	France	1992	16	16	2	32	0	1	0	0	0	0	0
Veritas	West Germany	1951–1953	6	6	15	18	0	n/a	0	0	0	n/a	0
Virgin (Note: Virgin subsequently became Marussia F1, then Manor Racing.)	United Kingdom, Russia (Note: Virgin had a British licence in 2010 and a Russian one in 2011.)	2010–2011	38	38	3	76	0	0	0	0	0	0	0
Wolf (Walter Wolf Racing) (Note: Wolf formerly Frank Williams Racing Cars.)	Canada	1977–1979	48	47	4	54	3	79	1	2	13	0	0
Zakspeed	West Germany	1985–1989	74	54	7	136	0	2	0	0	0	0	0
Constructor	Licensed in	Seasons	Races Entered	Races Started	Drivers	Total Entries	Wins	Points	Poles	FL	Podiums	WCC	WDC

=== Indianapolis 500 only ===
The following are constructors whose only participation was in the Indianapolis 500 from 1950 to 1960 when the race was part of the Formula One World Drivers' Championship. All were based in the United States.

- Adams
- Bromme
- Christensen
- Emil Diedt
- Frank DelRoy
- Dunn
- Elder
- Quin Epperly
- Wayne Ewing
- Hall
- Eddie Kuzma
- Langley
- Lesovsky
- Carl Marchese
- Meskowski
- Lou Moore
- Nichels
- Olson
- Pankratz
- Pawl
- Phillips
- Johnny Rae
- George Salih
- Schroeder
- Sherman
- Russ Snowberger
- Stevens
- Sutton
- Trevis
- Turner
- A. J. Watson
- Wetteroth

== Privateer teams ==
From the inaugural 1950 British Grand Prix until the 1981 Spanish Grand Prix numerous privateer teams entered cars, built by another companies as their constructors, in World Championship events. Some of them, such as Tyrrell and Williams, later began to build their own chassis and thus became constructors as well as works teams. At the 1981 Spanish Grand Prix the Equipe Banco Occidental team became the last privateer team to have entered a car for a race alongside a works team when they entered a Williams car alongside the Williams works team. During the period of the 1950–1981 seasons, privateer teams won 20 World Championship races in total. Only once (the Matra International team in 1969) a privateer team helped a constructor (Matra) to win the World Constructors' Championship and a driver (Jackie Stewart) to win the World Drivers' Championship.

=== Privateer teams by number of wins ===
Privateer team	Number of wins	First win	Last win	Constructor(s)
(United Kingdom) Matra International / Tyrrell Racing	10	1968 Dutch Grand Prix	1970 Spanish Grand Prix	(France) Matra* (9), (United Kingdom) March** (1)
(United Kingdom) Rob Walker Racing	9	1958 Argentine Grand Prix	1968 British Grand Prix	(United Kingdom) Cooper** (4), (United Kingdom) Lotus** (5)
(Italy) FISA	1	1961 French Grand Prix***	1961 French Grand Prix	(Italy) Ferrari

* All constructor's wins
** First win for the constructor
*** Team's only championship race

== See also ==
- List of Formula One World Constructors' Champions
- List of Formula One Grand Prix winners (constructors)
- List of automobile manufacturers

== Bibliography ==
- Mansell, Nigel, ed. (2001). The Official 2001–2002 Formula One Record Book. Holborn, London: European Press Ltd. ISBN 0-9541368-0-2.
- Hughes, Mark; Tremayne, David (2002). The Concise Encyclopedia of Formula 1. Parragon. pp. 82–83. ISBN 0-75258-766-8.
- Hayhoe, David; Holland, David (2006). Grand Prix Data Book (4th ed.). Haynes Publishing. ISBN 1-84425-223-X.
