= Bleu de France =

Bleu de France stands for

- Bleu de France (colour)
- MS Bleu de France, a cruise ship

== See also ==
- France Bleu, radio network in France
- Les Bleus (disambiguation)
