= Justin King =

Justin King may refer to:

- Justin King (businessman) (born 1961), former CEO of J Sainsbury plc
- Justin King (guitarist) (born 1980), American musician and artist
- Justin King (American football) (born 1987), American football cornerback
