= Bleu =

Bleu or BLEU may refer to:

- Three Colors: Blue, a 1993 film
- BLEU (Bilingual Evaluation Understudy), a machine translation evaluation metric
- Belgium–Luxembourg Economic Union
- Blue cheese, a type of cheese
- Parti bleu, 19th century political group in Quebec, Canada
- Bleu (blue-rare), synonymous with "extra rare", indicating a barely-cooked meat preparation; very red and cold
- Le Bleu, a 2001 album by Justin King
- France Bleu, the former name of Ici (radio network) group of French regional radio stations

== People ==
- Bleu (musician), a member of the pop group L.E.O.
- Corbin Bleu, an American actor, model, dancer and singer
- Yung Bleu, an American record producer, rapper and singer also known as "Bleu"
- Deis, a character from the Breath of Fire role-playing video game series known as "Bleu" in the English versions

== See also ==
- Blue (disambiguation)
- Lebleu (disambiguation)
- Les Bleus (disambiguation)
