= Lebleu =

Lebleu, leBleu, Le-Bleu, le Bleu, or variation, may refer to:

== Places ==
- LeBleu Settlement, Louisiana, USA

== People ==
- Conway LeBleu (1918–2007), Louisiana politician
- Dave Lebleu (drummer), U.S. musician

== Other uses ==
- Le Bleu (2001 album), a 2001 album by Justin King

== See also ==
- Bleu (disambiguation)
- Les Bleus (disambiguation)
