= Les Bleus =

Les Bleus may refer to:

== National team of France ==
Les Bleus (French for "The Blues") is often used in a French sporting context, and in particular may refer to:

- France's national team:
  - France national football team
  - France national rugby union team
  - France national basketball team
  - France men's national ice hockey team
  - France men's national field hockey team

== Other uses ==
- Les Bleus (TV series), M6 French police drama television series
- Les Bleus, a nickname for football club SC Bastia

== See also ==
- Bleu (disambiguation)
- Bleu de France (disambiguation)
- Lebleu (disambiguation)
- Les Bleues (disambiguation)
