= Automobili Turismo e Sport =

Italian auto racing constructor and team

ATS
- Full name: Automobili Turismo e Sport S.p.A.
- Base: Italy
- Founder(s): Carlo Chiti; Giotto Bizzarrini
- Noted drivers: (United States) Phil Hill (Italy) Giancarlo Baghetti

Formula One World Championship career
- First entry: 1963 Belgian Grand Prix
- Races entered: 5
- Constructors' Championships: 0
- Drivers' Championships: 0
- Race victories: 0
- Pole positions: 0
- Fastest laps: 0
- Final entry: 1963 Italian Grand Prix

ATS as a Formula One engine manufacturer
Formula One World Championship career
- First entry: 1963 Belgian Grand Prix
- Last entry: 1967 British Grand Prix
- Races entered: 7
- Chassis: ATS, Derrington-Francis, Cooper
- Constructors' Championships: 0
- Drivers' Championships: 0
- Race victories: 0
- Pole positions: 0
- Fastest laps: 0

ATS (Automobili Turismo e Sport) is an Italian automotive constructor. It once had a racing team that operated between 1963 and 1965, formed after the famous "Palace Revolution" at Ferrari.

== Production history ==
The company was formed by Carlo Chiti and Giotto Bizzarrini, among others – intending for it to be a direct competitor to Ferrari both on the race track and on the street. Chiti and Bizzarrini built, with sponsorship from the Scuderia Serenissima's Count Giovanni Volpi, a road-going sports car and a Formula One racing car. It was presented in April 1963 at the Geneva Motor Show.

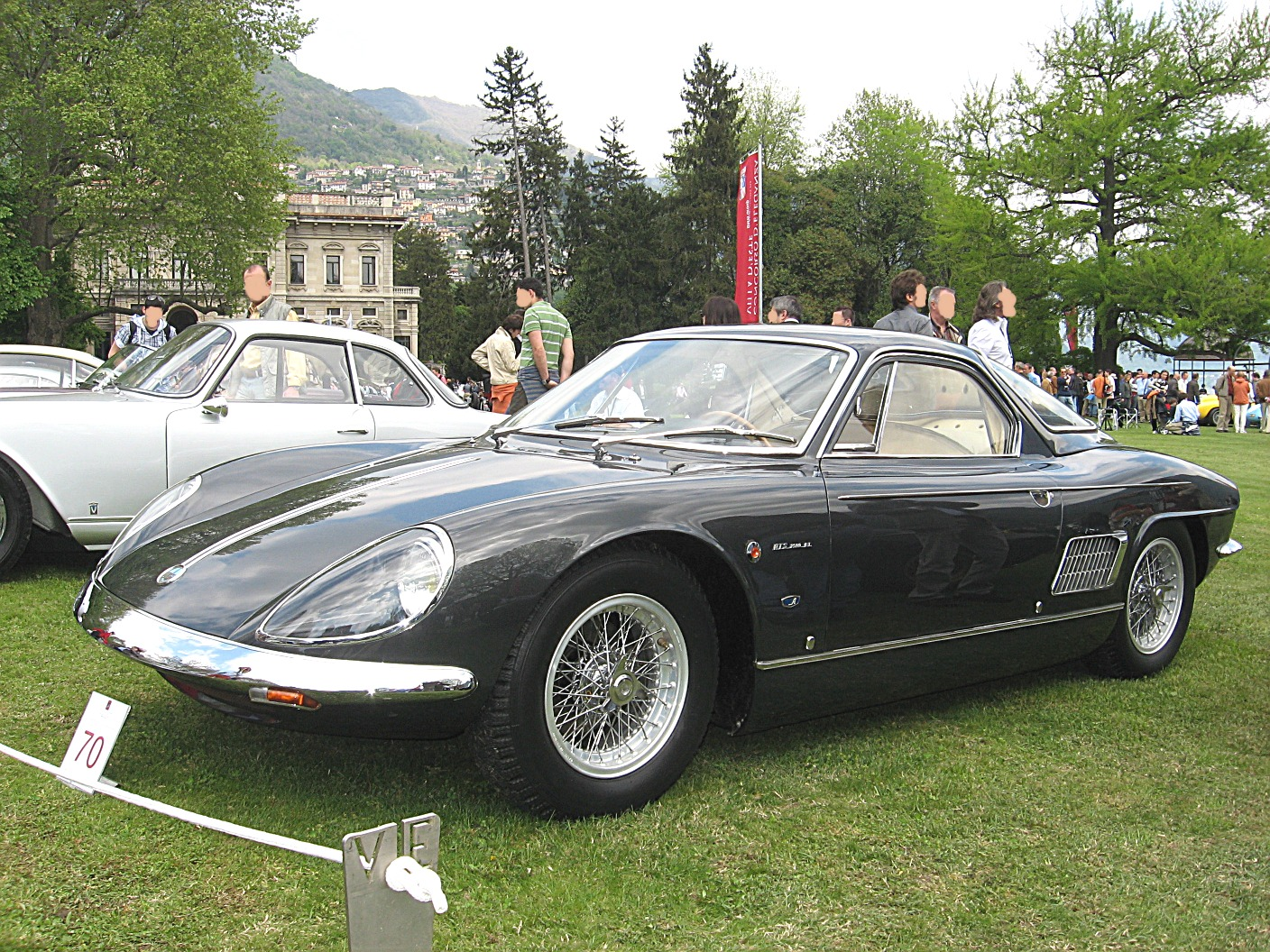
ATS 2500 GT

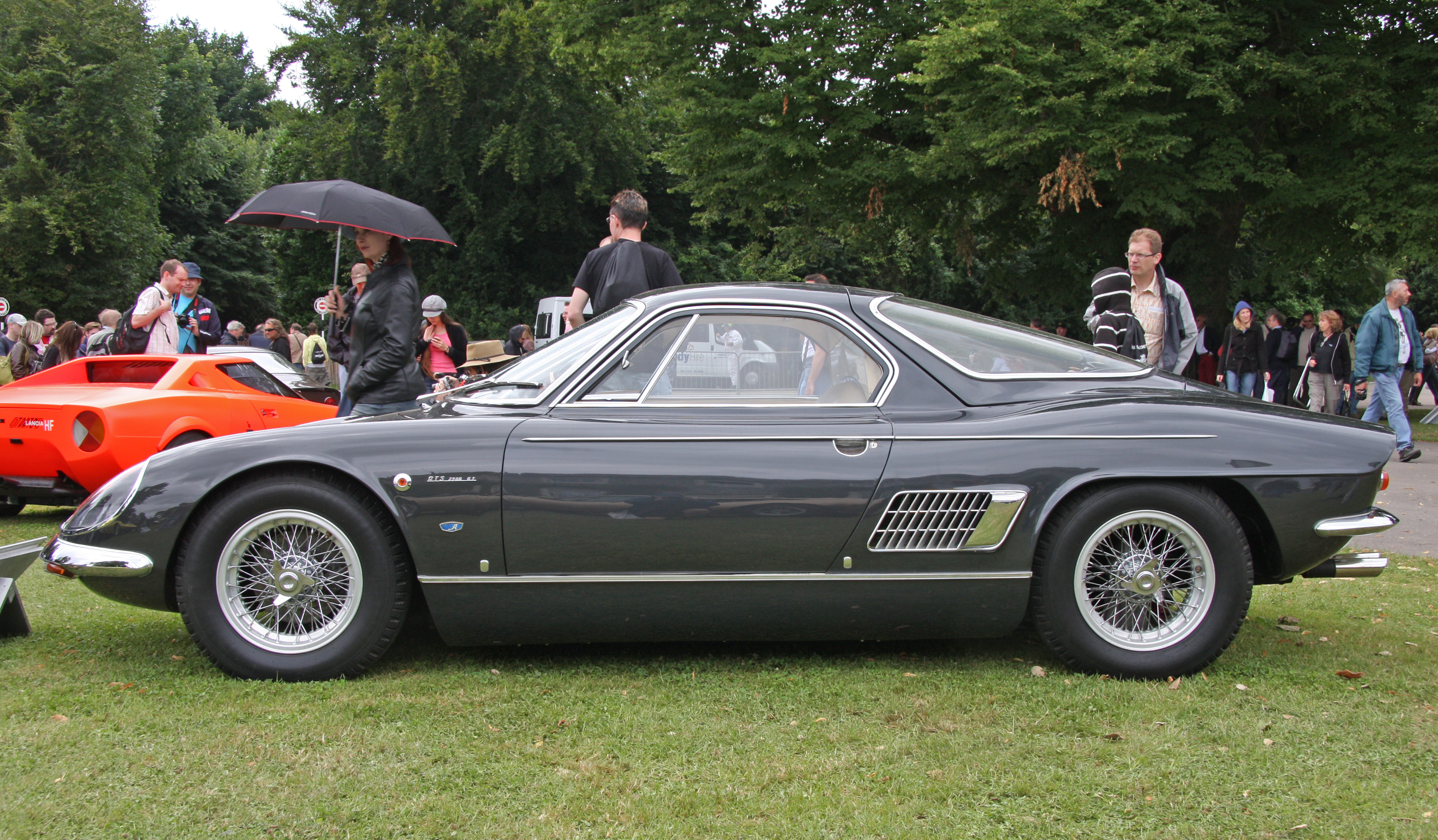
ATS 2500 GT sideview

The sports car was the ATS 2500 GT, a small coupé developed by Chiti and Bizzarrini with a Franco Scaglione-designed bodywork built by Allemano. The engine was a mid-mounted 2.5 L V8 engineered by Chiti, capable of achieving 245 hp (180 kW) and accelerating to 257 km/h (160 mph). Only 12 cars were reportedly built, and few exist today. Apart from being the second mid-engine sports cars (the René-Bonnet / Matra Djet was presented five months earlier at the Salon de l'Autombile in Paris, France), the 2500 GT never gained fame or popularity, but its 90 degree DOHC V8 with a flatplane crankshaft was later developed into Alfa Romeo Tipo 33 engine in 2 L, 2.5 L and 3 L formats by Carlo Chiti at Autodelta.

== Racing history ==
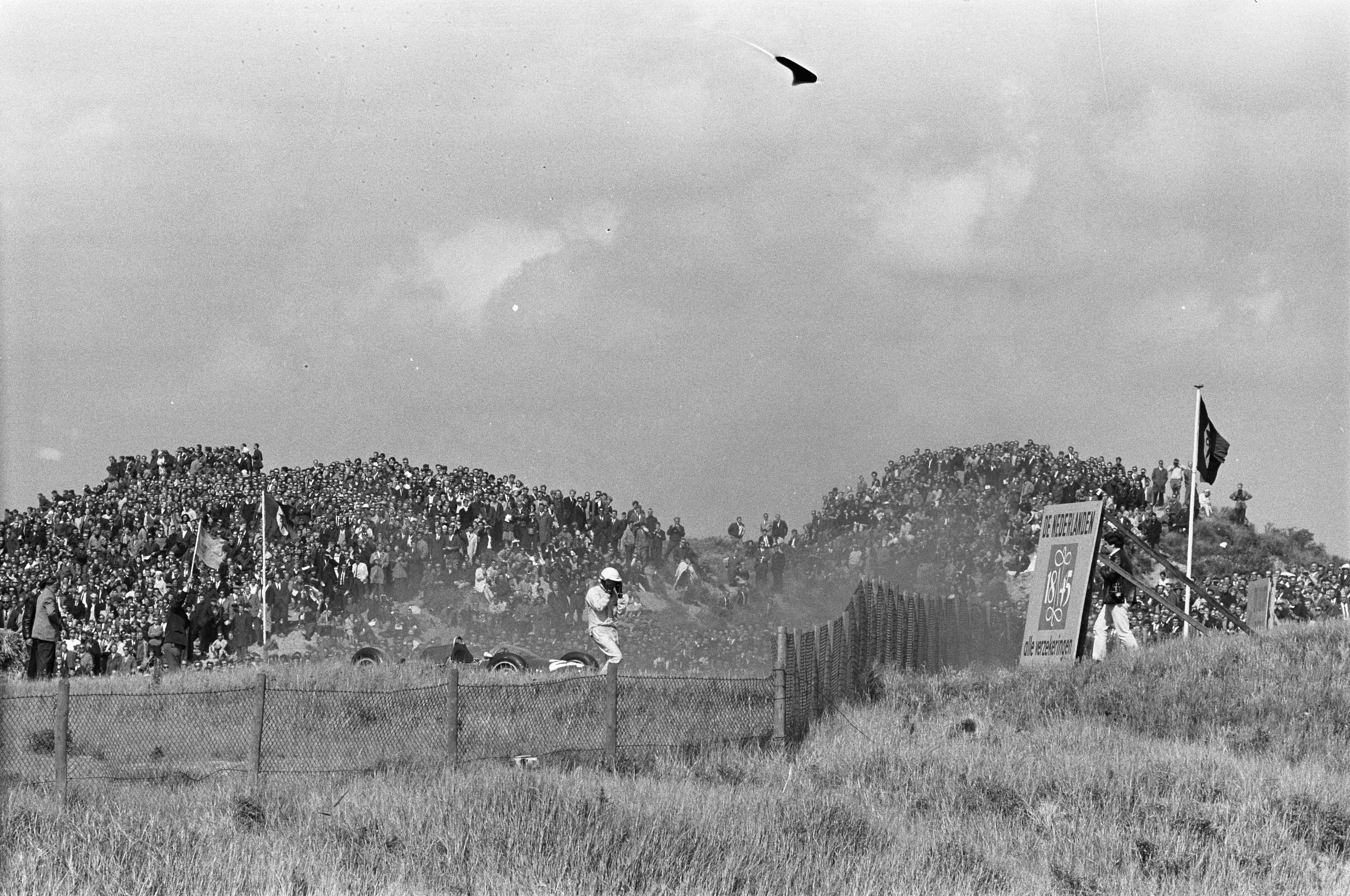
Phil Hill retiring the A.T.S. Tipo 100 at the 1963 Dutch Grand Prix

Construction of a Formula One car, the Tipo 100, began in mid-1962 on a farm near Bologna, with the car being unveiled in that city in December 1962. The Tipo 100 had a pencil thin body, and was powered by a V8 1,494cc engine, which featured fuel injection and double-overhead camshafts. The transmission was a 6-speed Colotti gearbox. Suspension consisted of rocker arms with inboard coils for the front, and double wishbones with coils for the rear, while disc brakes were mounted inboard. Total weight was just over 1,000 pounds. The cars were to be driven by Phil Hill and Giancarlo Baghetti, who had both left Ferrari after a disappointing 1962 season. Motorcycle racer Mike Hailwood test-drove in February 1963.

Testing took place at Monza, but this was slow and tedious, as when something broke, the car had to be taken back to Bologna for repairs, and then taken back to Monza for further testing. One of the major problems was chassis flexing, which was fixed by the unusual method of reinforcing tubes being welded over the top of the engine. The car was entered for several non-Championship races early in the season, but was withdrawn, due to not being ready. A similar situation occurred for the Monaco Grand Prix, before the cars made their first appearance in June at the Belgian Grand Prix.

Spectators, officials and fellow competitors were shocked by the Tipo 100's appearance. After looking so fantastic at the public unveiling back in Bologna, they now had rumpled body panels, pock marks and were poorly painted. The cars were oily and greasy, the body panels were ill-fitting. Due to the reinforcing tubes being over the top of the engine, they had to be sawed apart for an engine change, and then welded back into place. A new higher engine cover had been hurriedly fabricated to hide the tubes.

Both cars retired, as was the case with in the Dutch Grand Prix on June 23. The team did not attend the French, British and German races. The Tipo 100 returned in September for the Italian Grand Prix, and both cars started and finished, although a long way down the field – Hill 11th and Baghetti 15th. That was the only race where an ATS was classified as a finisher, with both cars retiring in the United States Grand Prix and Mexican Grand Prix, which marked the end of A.T.S as a Formula 1 team.

The ATS would later be used in the Derrington-Francis project spearheaded by the Rob Walker Racing Team's former chief mechanic, Alf Francis. The car made one appearance at a Formula 1 race, the 1964 Italian Grand Prix, driven Mário de Araújo Cabral, where it retired after 25 laps. This car was subsequently restored in the late 1990s, and has appeared in historic racing meetings since then.

Count Volpi subsequently backed the Scuderia Serenissima which used much technology similar to ATS. Bruce McLaren used a Serenissima engine for a few Grands Prix in 1966.

== Post-bankruptcy revival ==
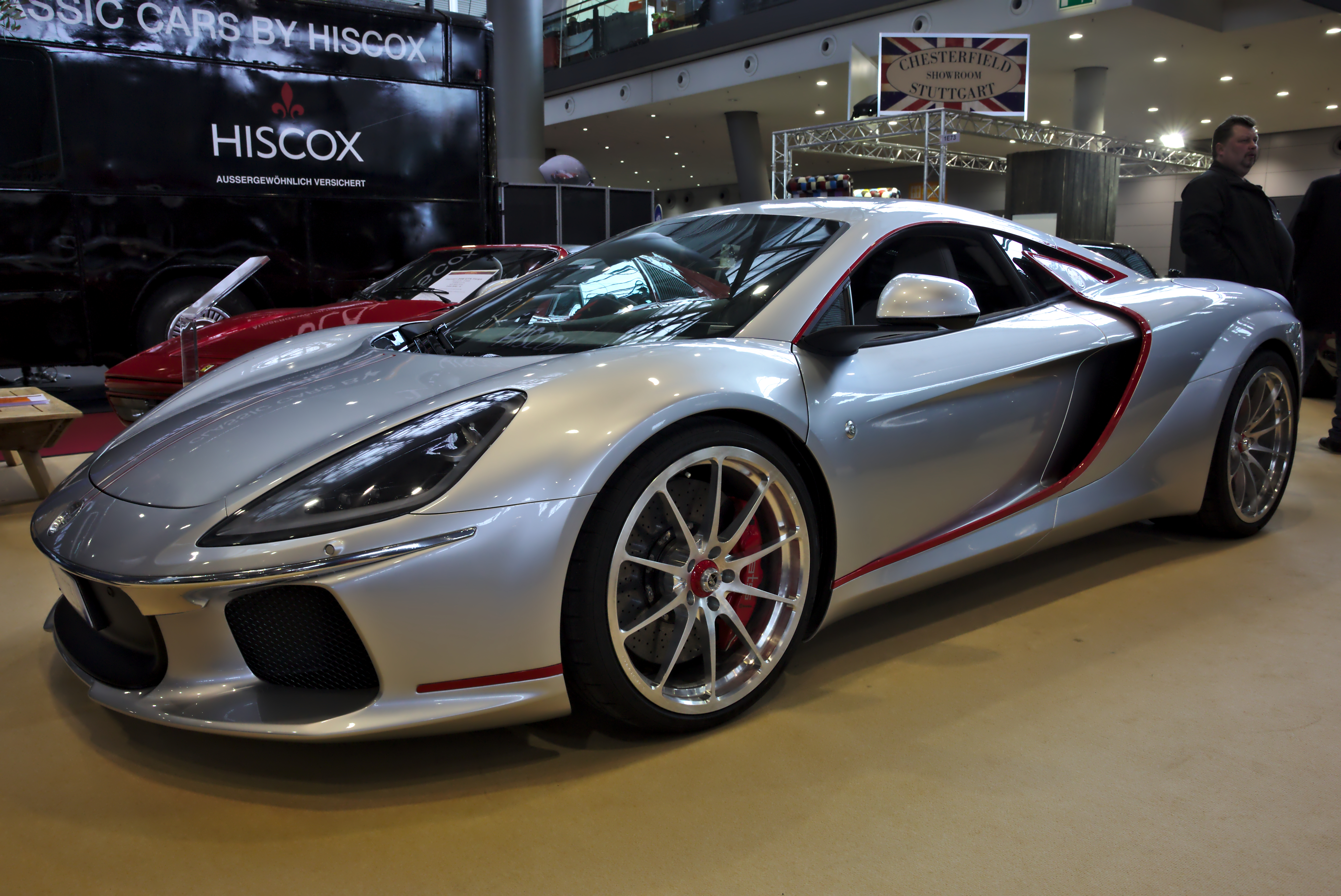
ATS GT (2017)

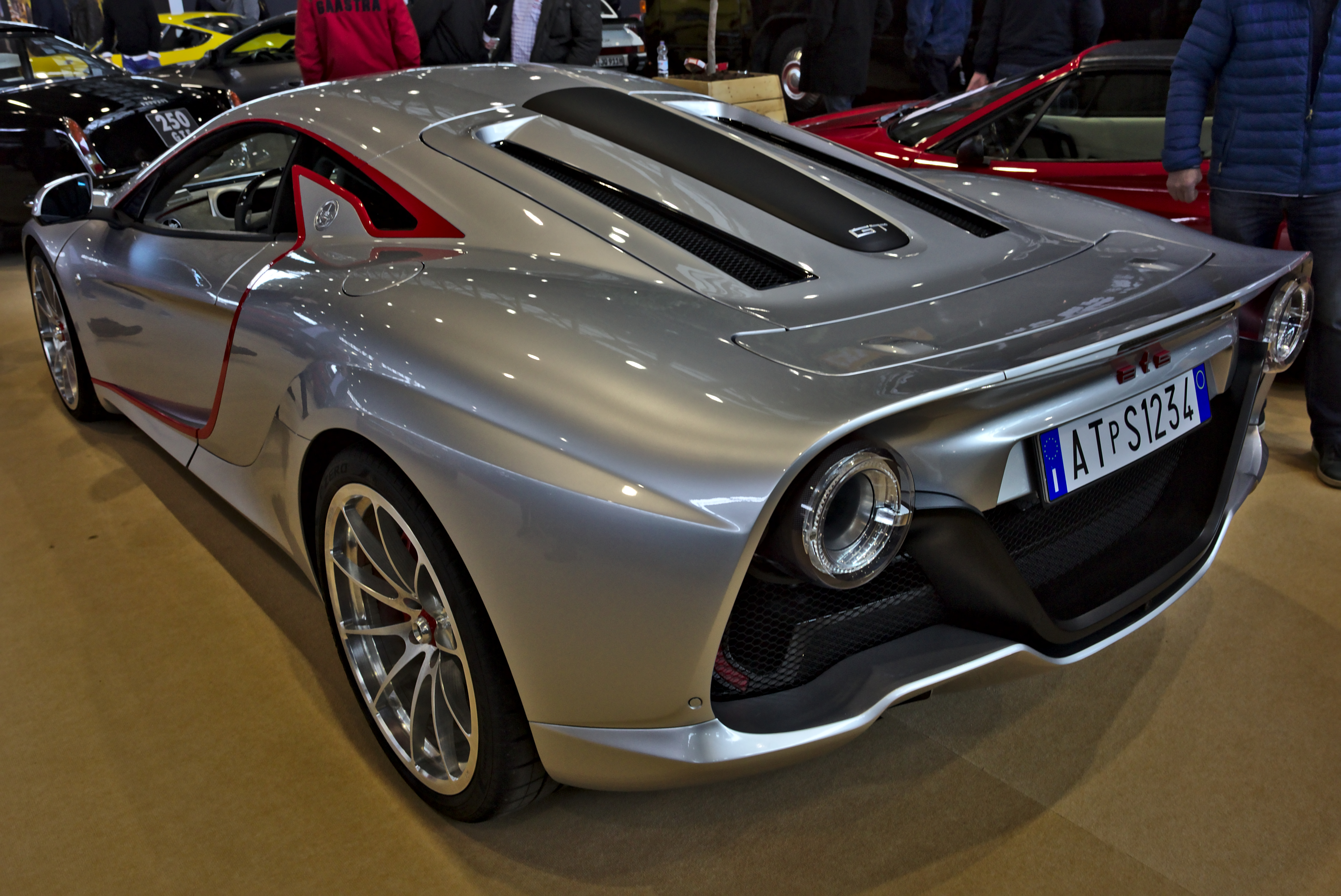
Rear view

After the demise of ATS, Bizzarrini moved to Lamborghini before building his own cars as Bizzarrini, while Chiti founded Autodelta together with fellow ex-Ferrari engineer Lodovico Chizzola, which would work closely with Alfa Romeo for the following decades.

In 2017, ATS introduced the GT, which uses McLaren's 3.8-litre twin-turbocharged V8 engine, as seen on McLaren's new models. ATS has planned production of 12 cars.

ATS revealed their sister brand, ATS Corsa, but not much is known. Their only produced car is the Corsa RRTurbo.

== Complete Formula One World Championship results ==
(key)

Year	Chassis	Engine	Tyres	Drivers	1	2	3	4	5	6	7	8	9	10	Points	WCC
1963	ATS 100	ATS V8	D		MON	BEL	NED	FRA	GBR	GER	ITA	USA	MEX	RSA	0	18th
1963	ATS 100	ATS V8	D	Phil Hill		Ret	Ret				11	Ret	Ret		0	18th
1963	ATS 100	ATS V8	D	Giancarlo Baghetti		Ret	Ret				15	Ret	Ret		0	18th

== Sources ==
- Stiel, Simon (2006). "Rebels Without Speed: The ATS Fiasco". F1 Rejects. Archived from the original on 22 March 2013.
