= Les Bleues =

Les Bleues may refer to:

- France women's national basketball team
- France women's national football team
- France women's national handball team
- France women's national rugby union team

== See also ==
- Les Bleus (disambiguation)
