= Marist Catholic High School =

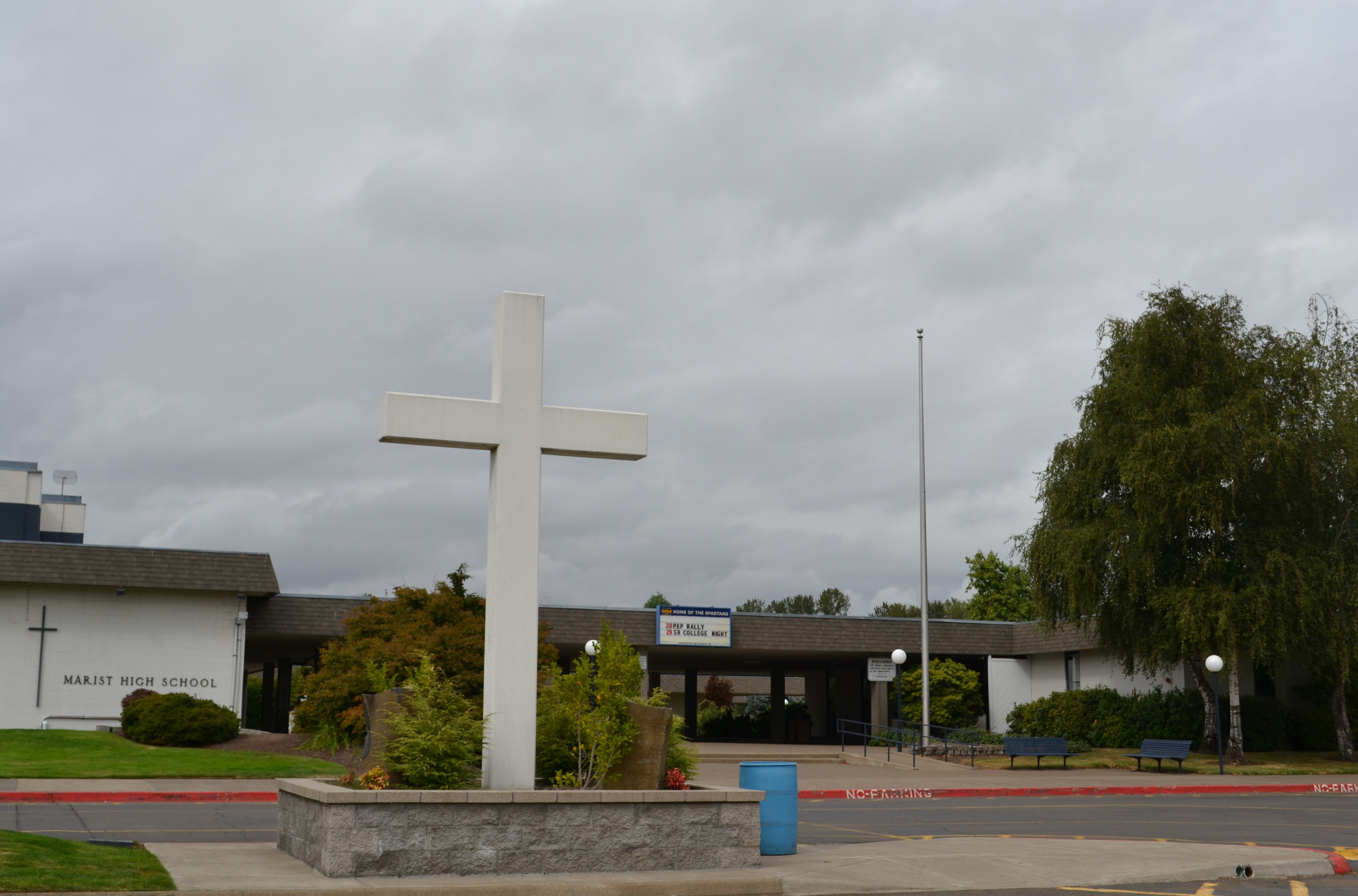

Location
- 1900 Kingsley Road; Eugene, Lane County, Oregon 97401; United States; 44.086841°N 123.114646°W

Information
- Type: Private
- Motto: We Are One
- Religious affiliations: Roman Catholic, Marist Brothers
- Opened: 1968
- Oversight: Archdiocese of Portland
- President: David Welch
- Teaching staff: 28.0 (FTE)
- Grades: 9-12
- Enrollment: 429
- Student to teacher ratio: 13.8
- Colors: Navy, Vegas Gold, and Columbia Blue
- Athletics conference: OSAA 4A-4 Sky Em League
- Mascot: Spartan
- Team name: Spartans
- Accreditation: Northwest Accreditation Commission
- Newspaper: The Spartan Spear
- Website: Marist Catholic Home Page

Marist Catholic High School is a private Roman Catholic, college preparatory school in Eugene, Oregon, United States founded by the Marist Brothers. It is part of the Roman Catholic Archdiocese of Portland.

== Academics ==
In 1985, Marist High School was honored in the Blue Ribbon Schools Program, the highest honor a school can receive in the United States.

== Athletics ==
Marist Catholic High School athletic teams compete in the OSAA 4A-4 Sky Em League (excluding Football which competes in 4A-SD3). The athletic director is Rick Gardner and the associate athletic director is Bart Pollard.

State championships:

- Baseball: 2026
- Boys Basketball: 1978, 1979, 1982, 2001, 2008, 2026
- Boys Golf: 2006, 2008, 2010, 2012, 2018, 2019, 2024, 2026
- Boys Soccer: 1996, 1997
- Boys Track and Field: 2007, 2014
- Boys Tennis: 1998†, 2013†, 2023, 2024
- Boys Cross Country: 2018
- Football: 1973, 2003, 2005, 2007, 2009, 2024
- Girls Basketball: 1996, 1997, 1999, 2018
- Girls Golf: 1998, 1999, 2000, 2001, 2002
- Girls Soccer: 2022, 2024, 2025
- Girls Swimming: 2008, 2009, 2010
- Girls Track and Field: 1980, 2005, 2006
- Girls Tennis: 1982, 1997, 1998, 2019, 2024, 2026
- Girls Cross Country: 2009, 2018, 2019
- Softball: 1982, 1983, 1985, 2000, 2008, 2009, 2017
- Volleyball: 1979, 1998, 1999, 2023, 2025

(† = Tied with 1 or more schools)

== Notable alumni ==
- Justin King, acoustic guitarist
- Steve Lyons, Class of 1978, professional baseball player (Boston Red Sox, Chicago White Sox); broadcaster with Fox Sports
