= Alf Francis =

British mechanic

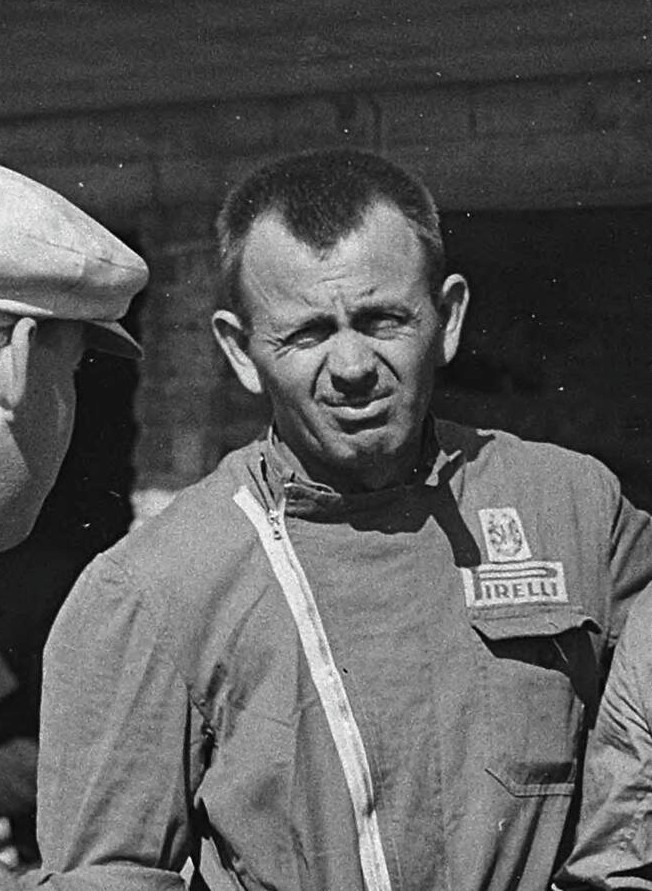
Alf Francis, in the pits at the 1955 Dutch Grand Prix

Alf Francis (born Alfons Kowaleski or Alphons Kowalewski 18 June 1918 – 28 June 1983) was a motor racing mechanic and racing car constructor.

Francis was born in Danzig but left during World War II, first for Portugal, then by sea to Liverpool in the UK, where he joined the Polish 1st Armoured Division. After World War II, he changed his nationality to British, and his name to Alf Francis. He became a racing mechanic for Stirling Moss and the Chief Mechanic at Rob Walker Racing Team.

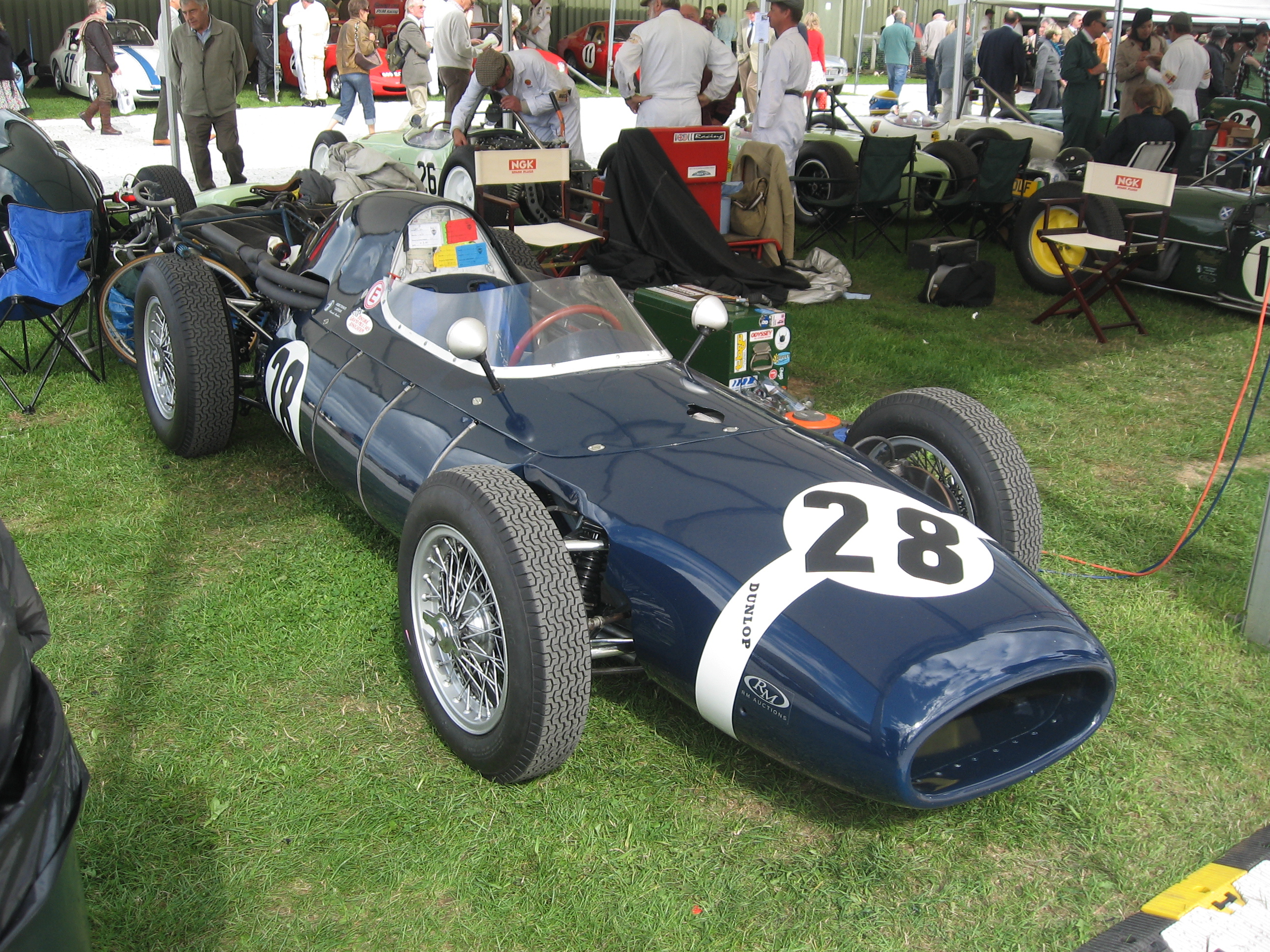
The Alf Francis-designed "Walker Special" Formula One car of 1960

At Rob Walker Racing Team, he maintained many Grand Prix cars including Cooper-Climax and Lotus 18, and helped developing the team's own Formula 1 car called Walker Special. Working with transmission engineer and designer Valerio Colotti, he became a partner of Colotti-Francis, and moved to Italy.

In 1963 he returned to England, where he was involved in the unsuccessful Derrington-Francis Formula One project. He subsequently immigrated to the US, where he built cars for lower racing formulae. He died in Oklahoma City in 1983.

In 1957 he authored his biography Alf Francis: Racing Mechanic with journalist Peter Lewis.
