= Justin King (guitarist) =

American musician, photographer (b. 1979)

Justin King (born June 13, 1979) is an American musician and artist, from Eugene, Oregon. King runs a recording studio in Brooklyn, New York called Vinegar Hill Sound, as well as doing part-time war photojournalism, in places like Iraq and Afghanistan.

== Background and current activities ==
King attended Marist High School, before attending South Eugene High School. He dropped out of high school as a sophomore and entered the San Francisco Art Institute to study painting. He began playing drums and guitar around age 14 and wrote and performed songs with one of his bassists Troy Sicotte. King began to focus on acoustic guitar at age 19, and in 1999 he released his self-titled album, followed by Opening in 2000. In 2001, King recorded "Le Bleu".

King returned to the US and began construction on his own studio "Blackberry Hill". The studio took about two years to complete during which time King toured the country as a solo guitarist opening for James Taylor, B. B. King, Diana Krall, North Mississippi All-Stars, Al Green and others. Just after building Blackberry Hill King recorded another instrumental record, "I-XII". Years prior to that, King started a band with James West (later replaced by Nadir Jeevanjee), Troy Sicotte (later replaced by Drew Dresman), and Ehren Ebbage (later replaced by Chris Plank) "Justin King and the Apologies". The band toured the country for about one year before being signed to a major label record deal with Epic Records in 2006.

The band recorded the self-titled record at King's Blackberry Hill studio as well as studios in Los Angeles, New York, and San Francisco. The band broke up around the end of 2007.

== Le Bleu and various side projects ==
In 2001, King released Le Bleu. He assembled a new band with longtime friends Ehren Ebbage (lead guitar) and Drew Desman (bass). In 2005, drummer James West and was replaced by Nadir Jeevanjee.

On March 20, 2007, King and his band, after a long struggle, ended their contract with Sony BMG/Epic Records. The band released a five-song EP, Fall/Rise, in spring 2007 before resuming touring, which included several performances in South Korea. The band's debut album, Justin King and The Apologies, was released on September 28, 2007.

His Myspace page announced the title of the new album as Humilitas Occidit Superbiam, and it was subsequently released digitally in November 2009.

== Discography ==
=== Solo albums ===
- Justin King (1999)
- Opening (2000)
- Le Bleu (2001)
- Humilitas Occidit Superbiam (2009)
- Short and Beautiful: A Song for Priscilla (2010) (Single)
- Le Bleu 2010 EDITION
- Vines (2018)

=== Justin King and the Apologies ===
- Pilot [1] (Likely Unreleased) (EP)
- Pilot [2] (2005) (EP)
- Bright and Dirty Lights (2005) (EP)
- Bright and Dirty Lights Taster Disc (2005)
- C-Sides (2006) (EP)
- Fall/Rise [Demo] (2006) (EP)
- Fall/Rise (2007) (EP)
- Justin King and the Apologies [Demo] (2007)
- Justin King and the Apologies (2007)

=== Justin King and The Raging Family ===
- Re Bleu: The Raging Family Le Bleu Remix (2008)

=== King West Manring Vamos ===
- I ~ XII (2008)
- From The Hill (2009)

=== King Radio ===
- Live in Japan (2011)
- King Radio (2015)
- Adeline (2017) (EP)

=== With Oatmello ===
- Campfire (2017) (EP)

== Full Discography Track Lists (in order) ==
- Justin King

1. Something About Angels

2. Spring

3. Sunday Morning

4. Scotland

5. Interlude

6. Sunshine

7. Square Dance

8. Sedona

9. Flying

10. Lullaby

11. For Jordan

12 - 19. [silent tracks]

20. title unknown [hidden track]

- Opening

1. She

2. Opening

3. Flying

4. After the Storm

5. Sunshine

6. Interlude

7. Riomaggiore

8. Something About Angels

9. Dreaming

- Le Bleu

1. Taps

2. Seville

3. After The Harvest

4. A Saucy Jig

5. Scrabo Tower

6. Northwest of Ju Ju

7. Loco Motives

8. Amazing Grace

9. Pam and John's House

10. August Train

11. Knock on Wood

12. Winter on The Hill

13. Ashokan Farewell

14. Paris Morning

15. Phunkdified

16. Child's Toy

17. Prinsengracht

18. The Mill Creek

19. Ashes

- Pilot (EP) [1] (Likely Unreleased)

1. Cue The Music

2. Goodbye Goodbye

3. Instrumental

4. Walkaway

- Pilot (EP) [2]

1. Beauty Bar

2. Change

3. Postcard

4. Devil and the Deep

- Bright and Dirty Lights (EP)

1. Change

2. March 19th

3. Inside the Lines

4. Burning Bridges

5. 3 a.m.

- C-Sides (EP)

1. On Our Sleeves

2. March 19th

3. Goodbye Goodbye

4. Instrumental

5. Nowhere Fast

6. Walkaway

7. Sweetheart

- Fall/Rise (EP)

1. Same Mistakes

2. Nowhere Fast

3. Reach You

4. On Our Sleeves

5. Rewind

- Justin King and the Apologies

1. Beauty Bar

2. Titanic/Bailing The Titanic

3. Missing Something

4. Postcard

5. Hours

6. 25 Signs

7. Change

8. Sweetheart

9. Devil and the Deep

10. Same Mistakes

11. Bright and Dirty Lights

12. Outro

(Disk 2:

1. Nowhere Fast

2. Reach You

3. On Our Sleeves

4. Rewind

- Re Bleu: The Raging Family Le Bleu Remix

1. Mill Creek

2. So Close

3. Landing Pads

4. Guitar Shrapnel

5. Especially You

6. Skipping Stones

7. Irish Glen

8. Broken Blue

9. Dreams

10. Last Light

11. Periwinkle Dubs

- I ~ XII

1. I

2. II

3. III

4. IV

5. V

6. VI

7. VII

8. VIII

9. IX

10. X

11. XI

12. XII

- From The Hill

(Same 12 Tracks from I ~ XII)

Bonus Tracks:

1. Spring

2. Scotland

3. Interlude

4. Square Dance

5. Sedona

6. Lullaby

7. title unknown [hidden track]

8. Black Sparrows

- Humilitas Occidit Superbiam

1. Almost There

2. Driving

3. Brightest As They're Passing By

4. Anchor In Your Veins

5. Rivers

6. No Escape

7. Sparrows

8. Homeward

9. On My Mind

10 A Toast

- Short and Beautiful: A Song for Priscilla

1. Your Black Hair

- Live in Japan

1. Paris Morning

2. Taps

3. Pam and John's House

4. August Train

5. Cadillac, France

6. Northwest of Ju Ju

7. Jig

8. Square Dance

9. Amazing Grace

10. Knock on Wood

11. Audra

12. After The Harvest

13. Untitled

14. Scrabo Tower

15. Locomotive

16. Phunkdified

17. Hilltop

18. With You (Bonus Track)

- King Radio

1. Alright

2. Sister

3. Don't Wait

4. Jenny

5. Can't Be

6. Fix It

7. Lonesome Nights

8. With You

9. The Valley

10. Thousand Yard

11. Ain't To Pray

12. Tomorrow

- Adeline (EP)

1. Adaline

2. Flood

3. Get Right

4. Tomorrow V2

- Campfire (EP)

1. Blink

2. Forest

3. Memory of You

4. Road Trip

5. First Frost

6. Fallen

7. Talking

- Vines

1. Ok For Colors

2. Tennis Court

3. Fire And Glass

4. Cannonball

5. El Crepúsculo Duerme

6. Heartbeats

7. Thinkin Bout You

8. Something New

9. Come Away With Me

10. In Dreams

11. Shine

12. For Audra
