= Bleu de France (colour) =

Shade of blue

Colour coordinates
- Hex triplet: #318CE7
- sRGB^{B} (r, g, b): (49, 140, 231)
- HSV (h, s, v): (210°, 79%, 91%)
- CIELCh_{uv} (L, C, h): (57, 90, 250°)
- Source: ColorHexa
- ISCC–NBS descriptor: Vivid blue
- B: Normalized to [0–255] (byte)

Bleu de France (French pronunciation: [blø də fʁɑ̃s], "Blue of France") is a colour traditionally used to represent France. Blue has been used in the heraldry of the French monarchy since at least the 12th century, with the golden fleurs-de-lis of the kings always set on a blue (heraldic "azure") background. A brighter version, based on the blue of the French Tricolour, is used in modern times, particularly in a sporting context. French national teams in all sports will normally use blue as their main colour.

Blue is France's national racing colour; therefore, several French motorsport teams have used it, including Alpine, Amilcar, Ballot, Bugatti, Delage, Delahaye, Gordini, Ligier, Mathis, Matra, Panhard, Pescarolo Sport, Peugeot, Prost Grand Prix, Rondeau, Salmson, Talbot-Lago, and Voisin.

The two notable exceptions are Citroën and Renault: the former has used red and white, whereas the latter has used yellow and black. Between the 2002 and 2006 seasons Renault F1 cars wore a blue colour not as the national racing colour of France but due to the team's title sponsor the Japanese cigarette brand Mild Seven. Blue de France appeared on the Enstone team's car again for the 2021 season, when the team rebranded to Alpine F1 Team, continuing the Alpine marque's association with the colour across motorsport.

Since a country is represented in the motorsport through a team and not through a constructor, French privateer teams entering cars built by constructors from another country before the 1968 season painted cars in the bleu de France blue, e.g. the French Guy Ligier's privateer team entered cars painted in bleu de France blue in 1966 and 1967 seasons despite the fact that they were built by the British constructor Cooper.

"French blue" has also been in use by the Massachusetts State Police, in uniform and livery, since June 1933, to render troopers immediately recognizable to the public. Since 1944 it has also been in use by Delaware State Police on their uniforms.

== Race cars in Bleu de France ==
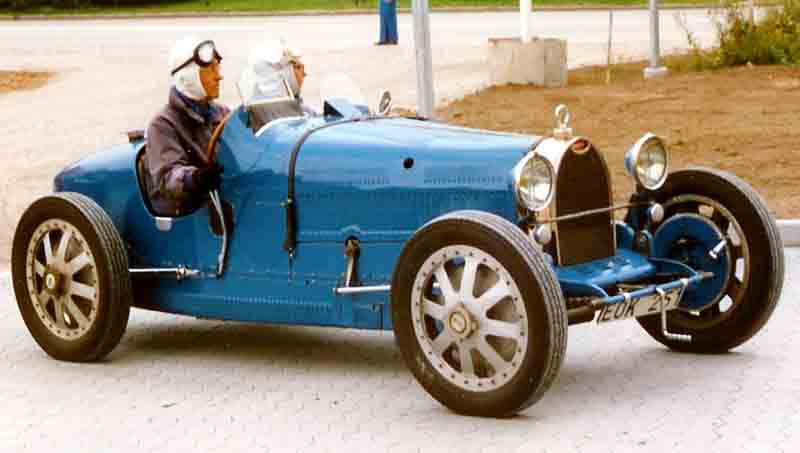
Bugatti Typ 35C Grand Prix Racer (1926)

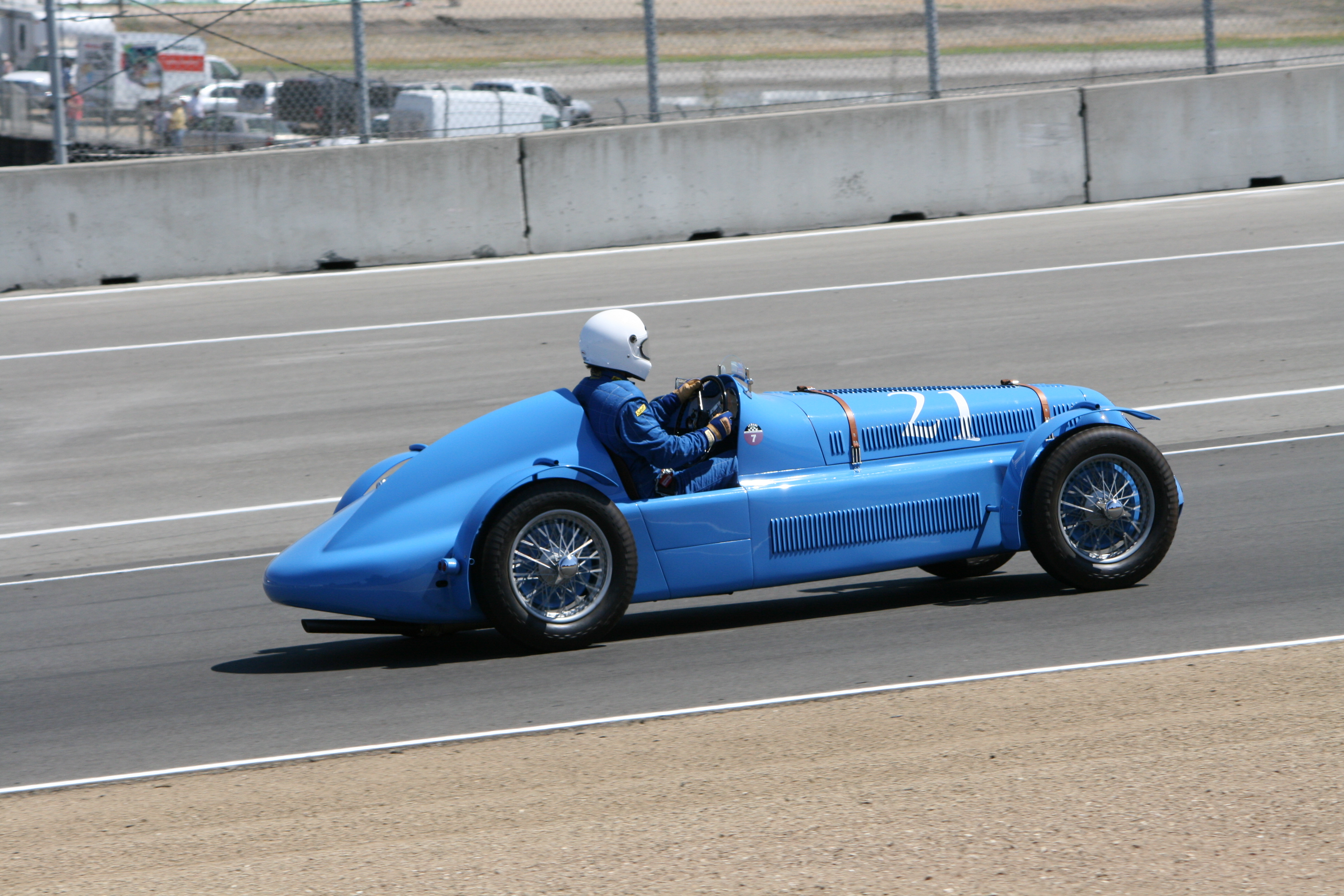
Delage D6

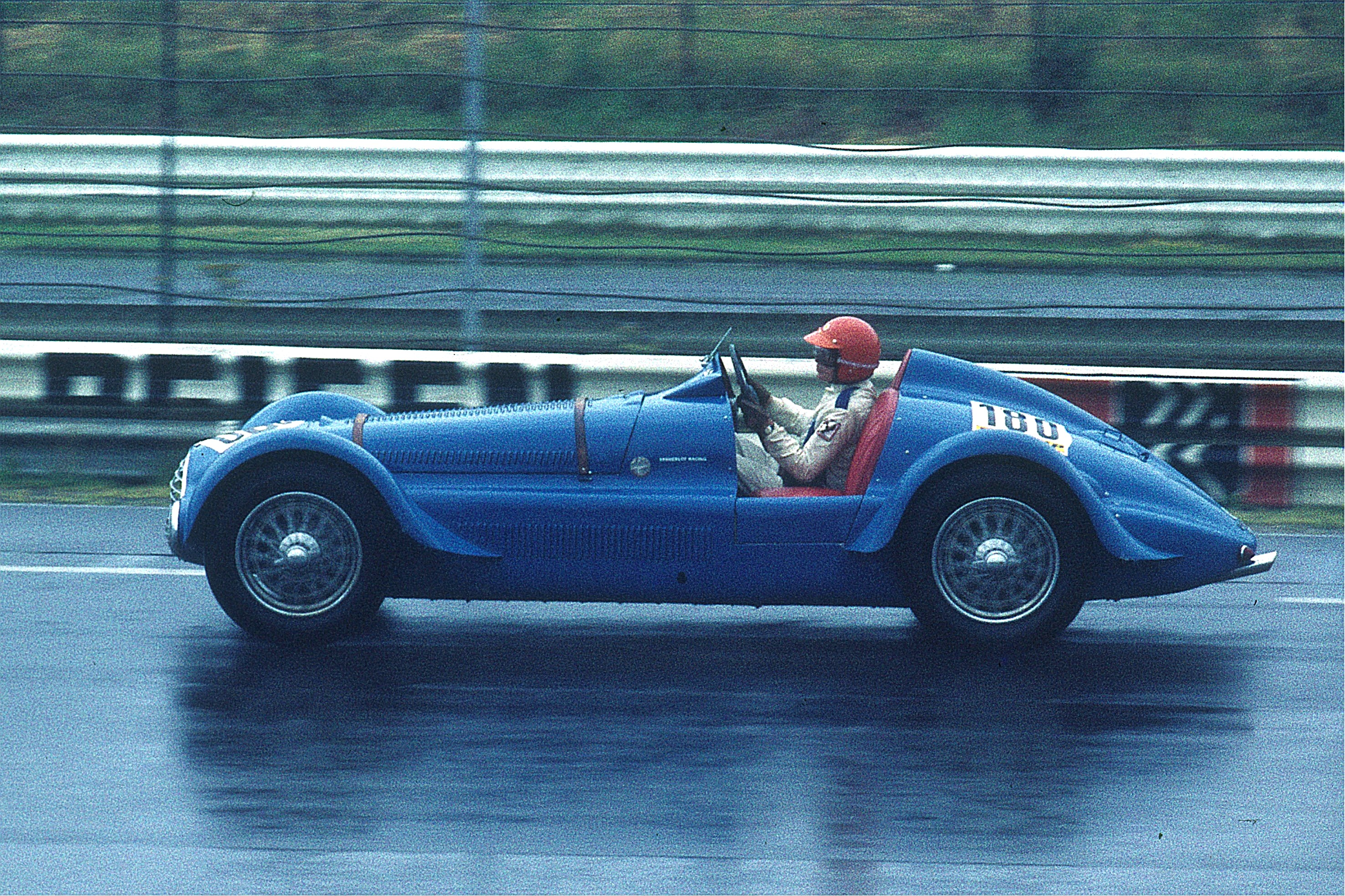
Delahaye 135 MS (1935)

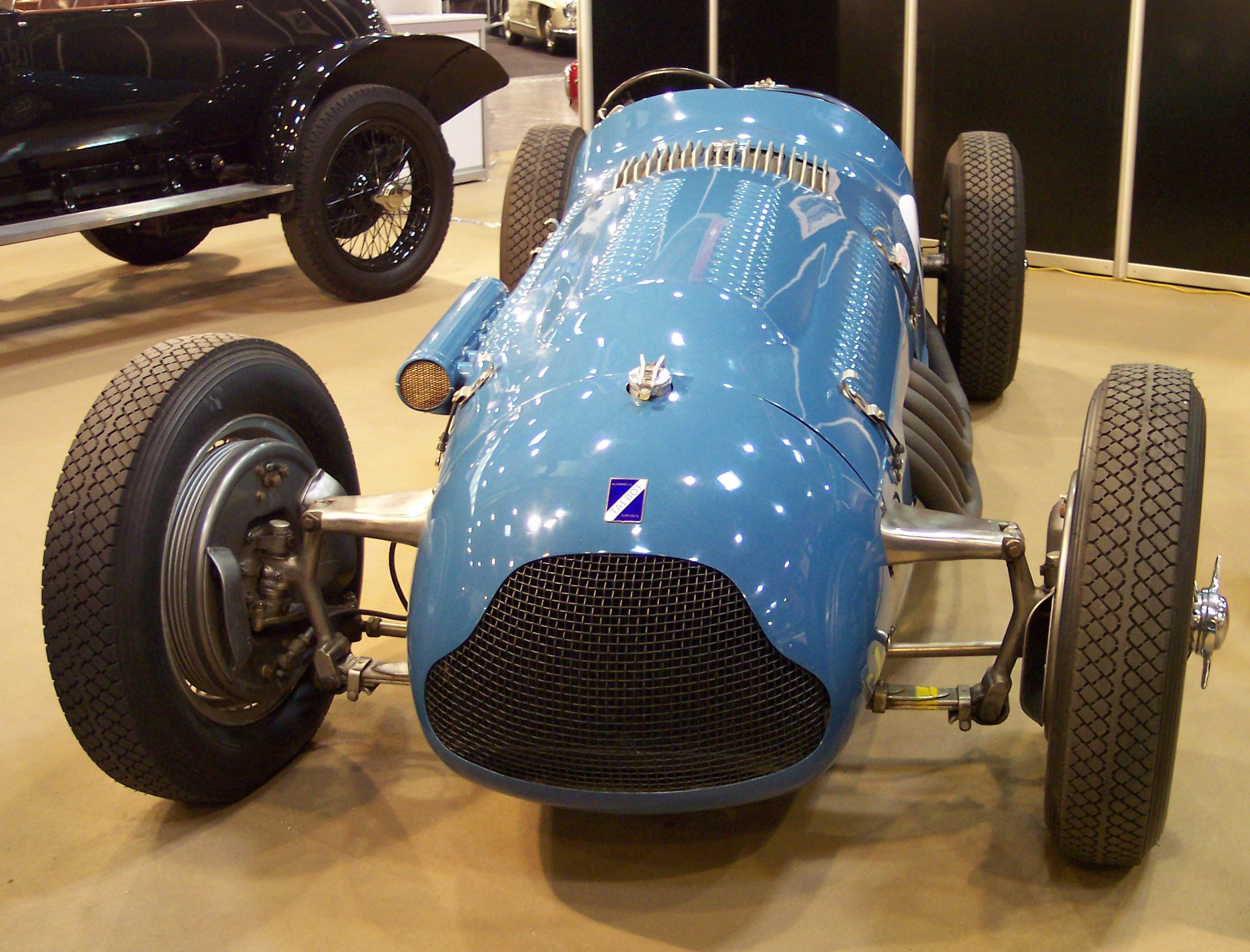
Talbot-Lago T26 Grand Prix (1949)

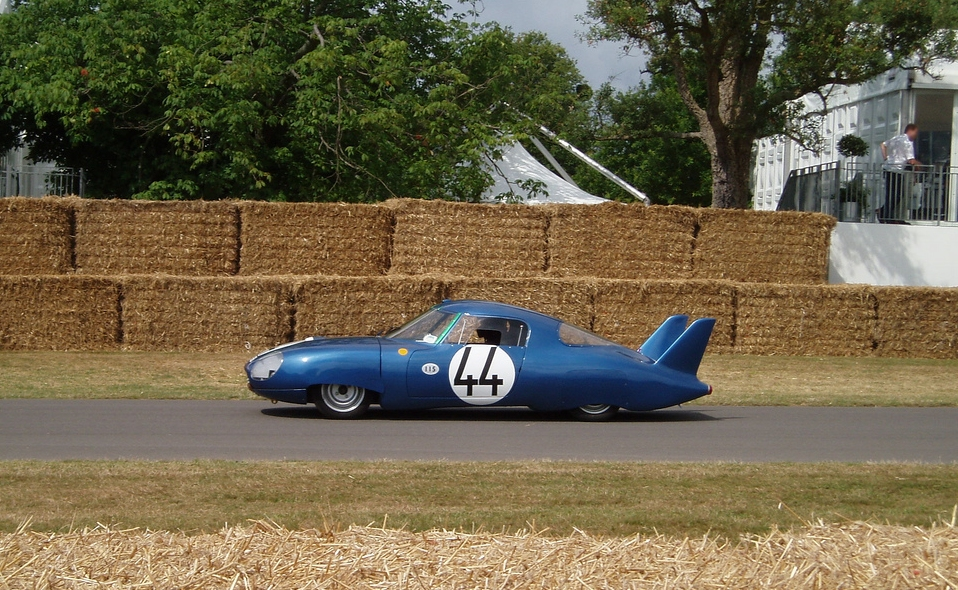
CD Panhard LM64 (1964)

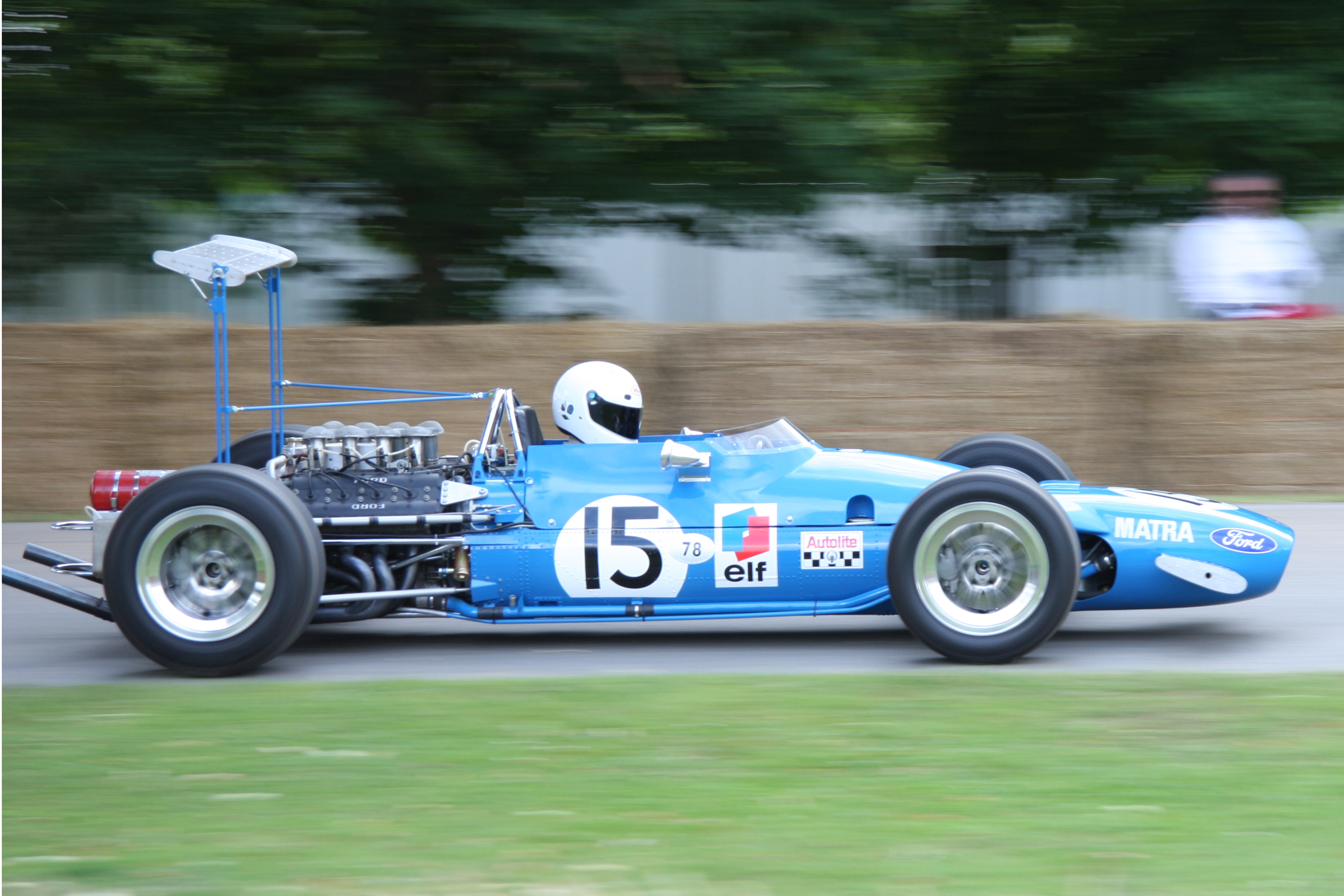
Matra MS10 (1968)

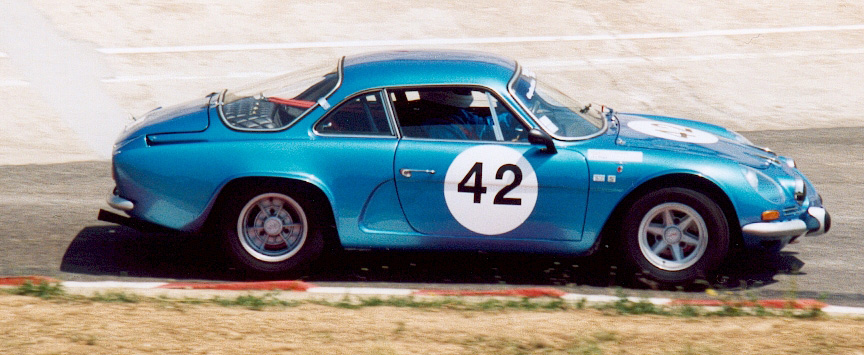
Alpine A110

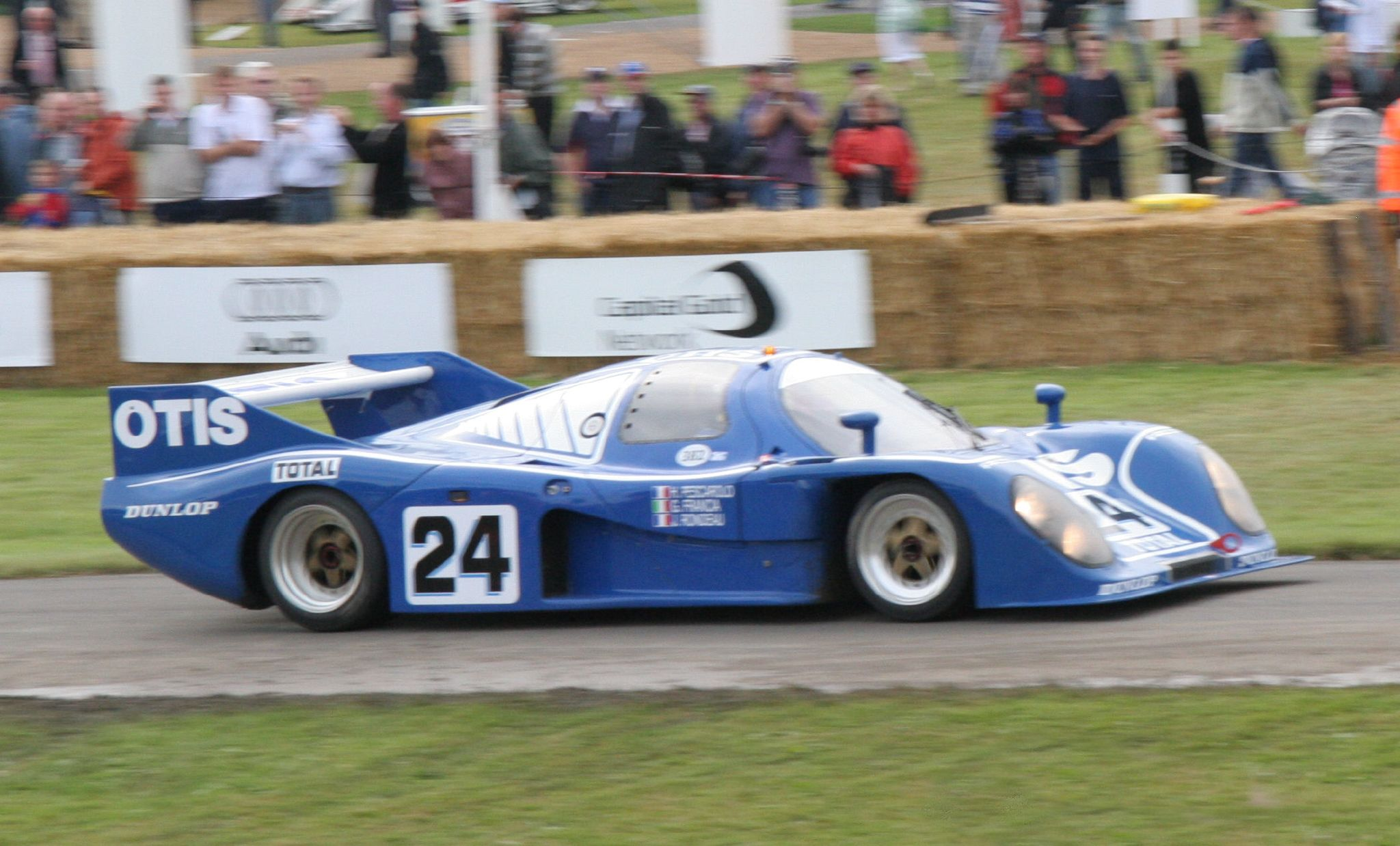
Rondeau M382

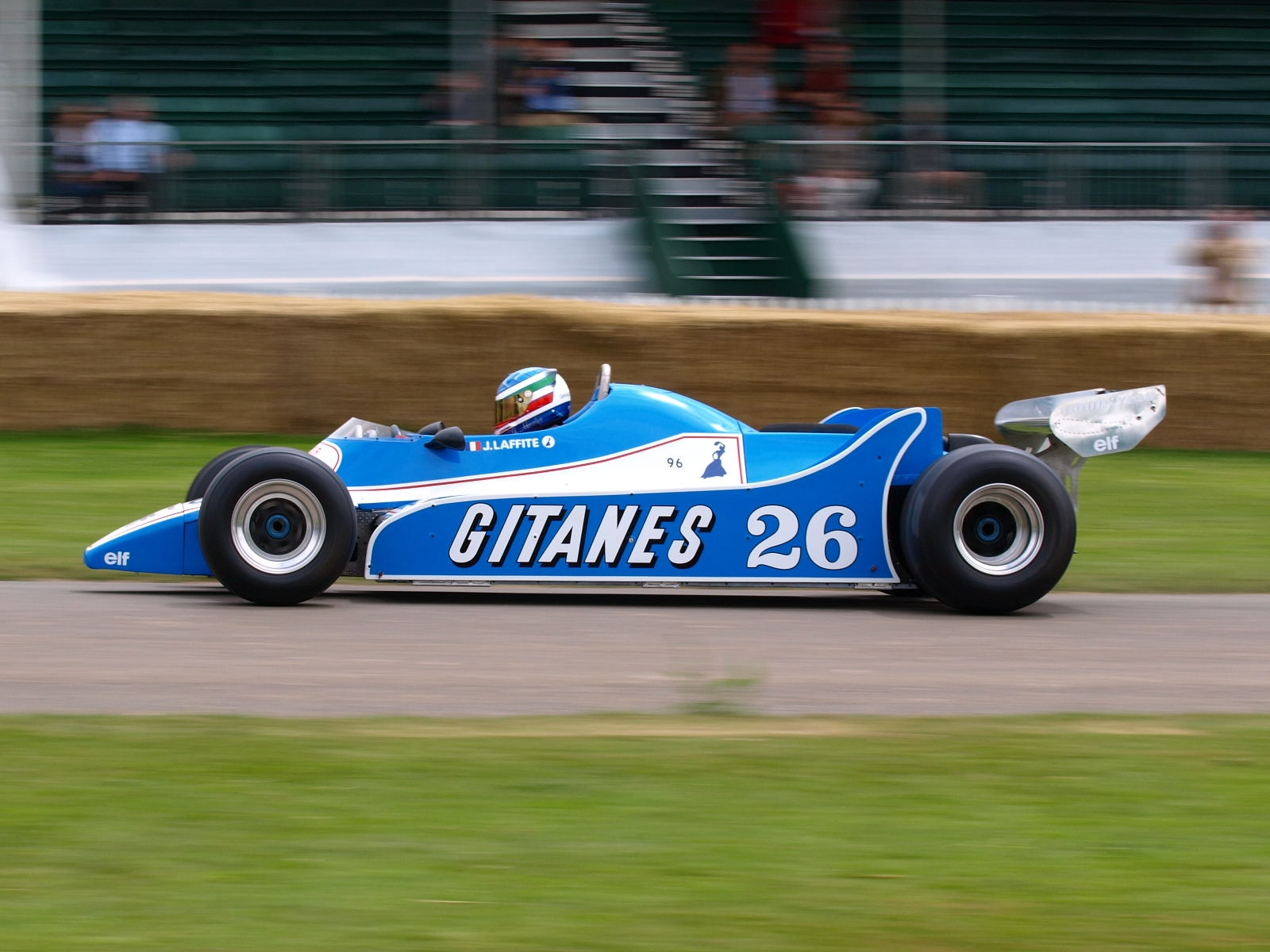
Ligier JS11-15 (1980)

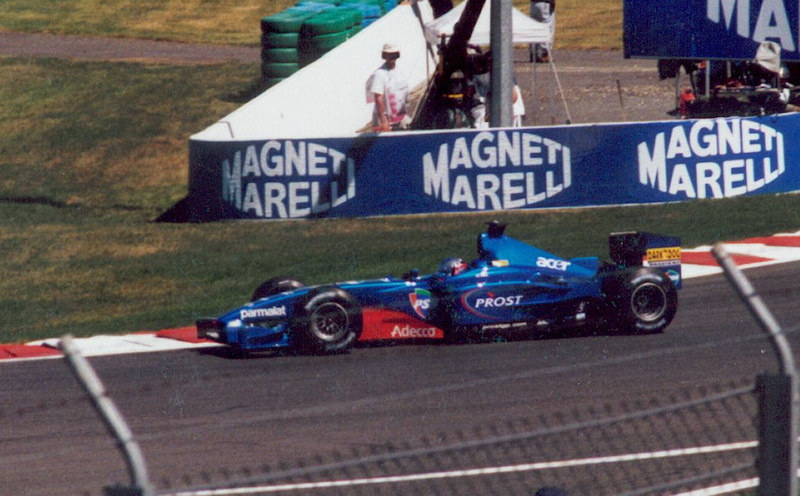
Prost AP04 F1 (2001)

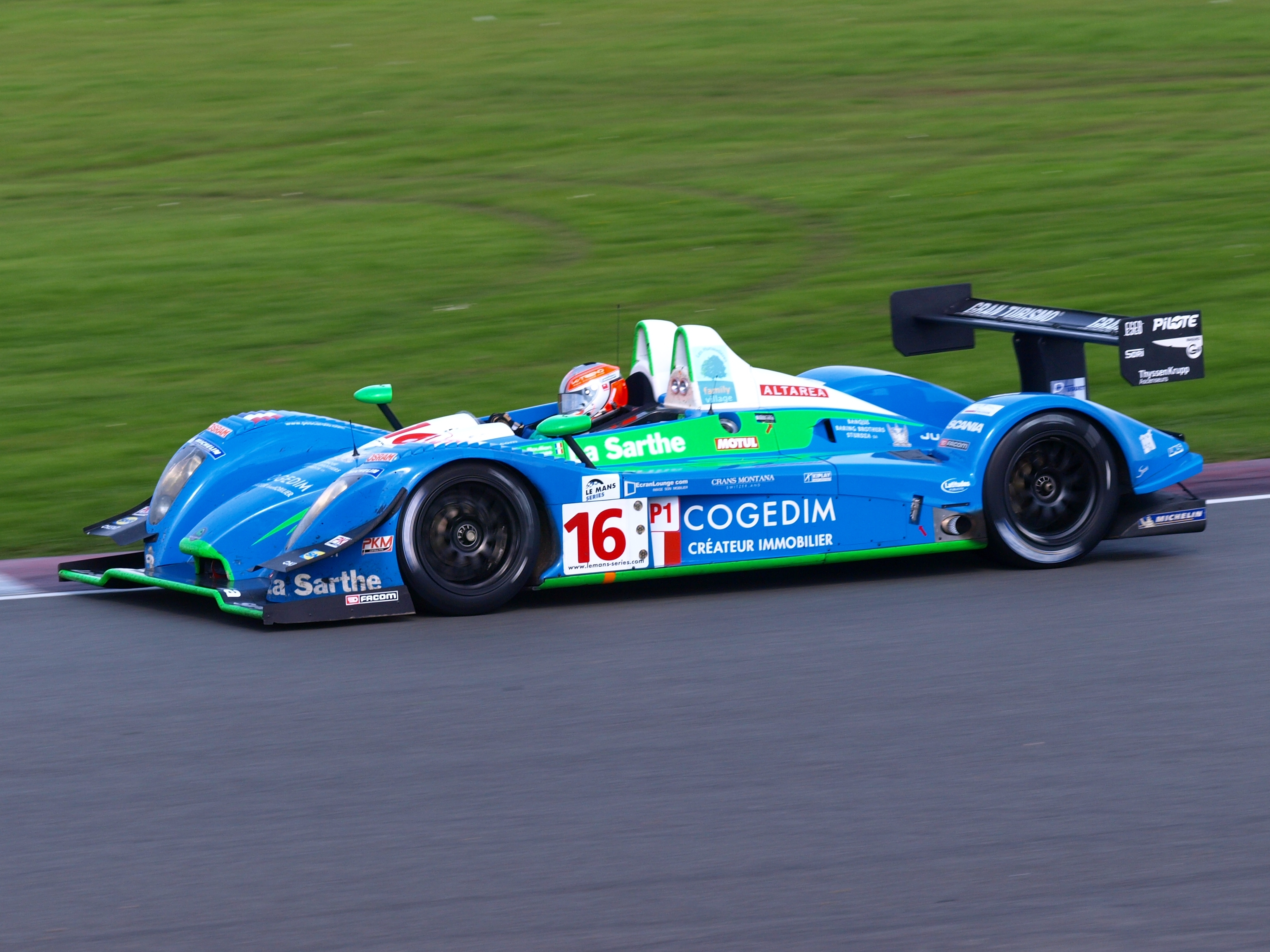
Pescarolo Sport 16 (2008)

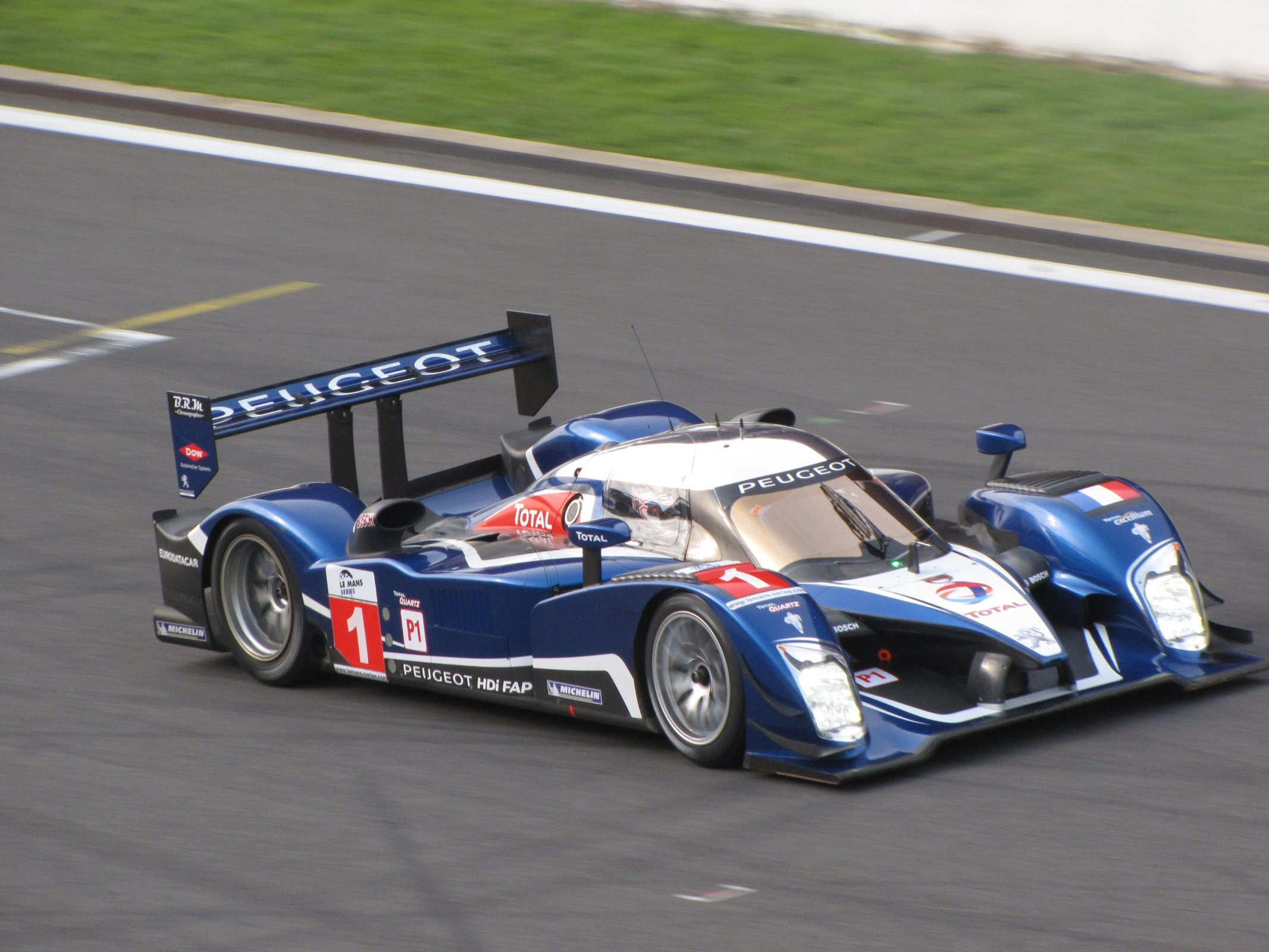
Peugeot 908 HDi FAP

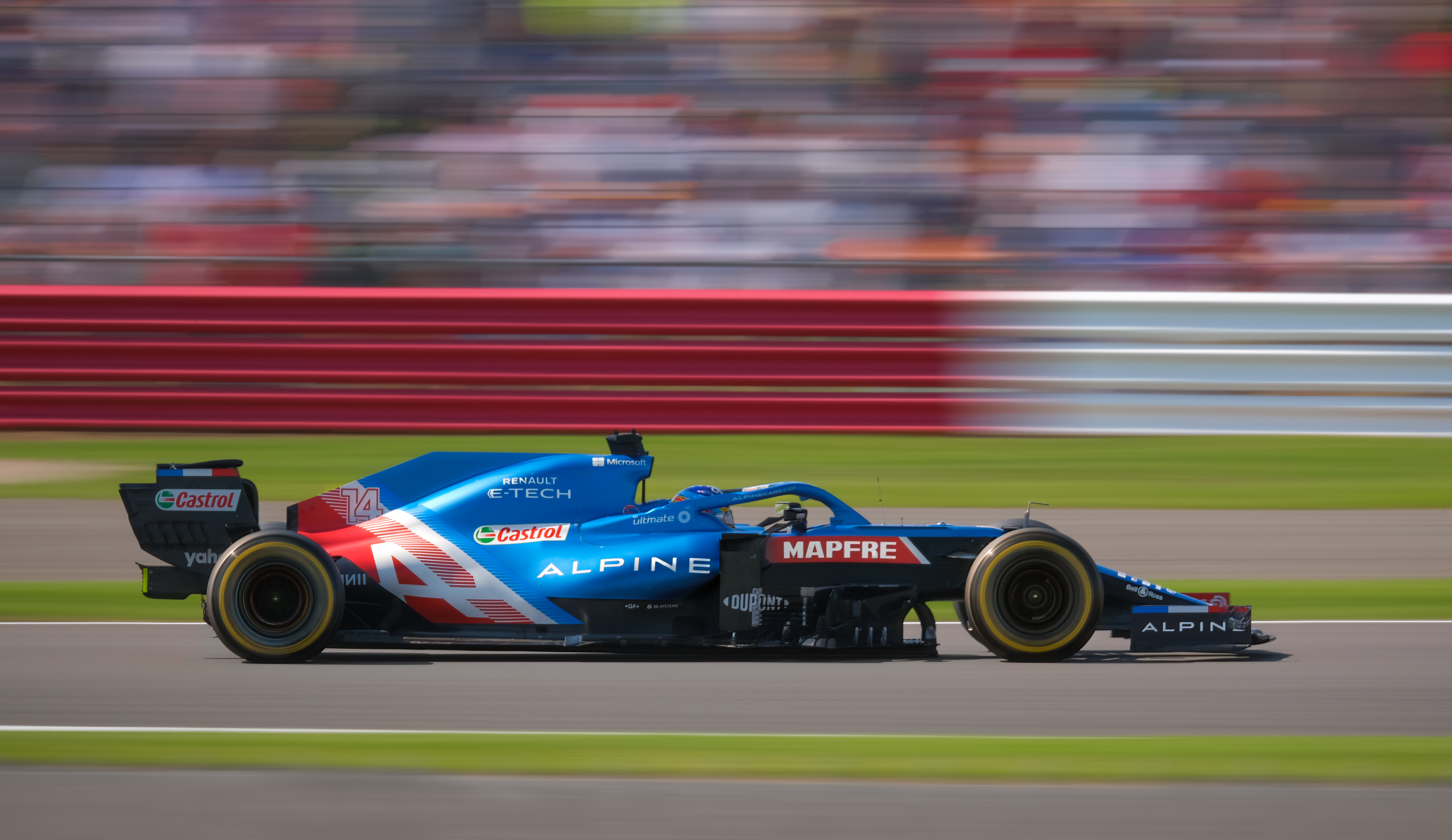
Alpine A521 (2021)

== See also ==
- List of colors
- List of international auto racing colours
