= Mário de Araújo Cabral =

Portuguese racing driver (1934–2020)

- Born: 15 January 1934; Cedofeita, Porto, Portugal
- Died: 17 August 2020 (aged 86)

Formula One World Championship career
- Nationality: (Portugal) Portuguese
- Active years: 1959–1960, 1963–1964
- Team(s): Derrington-Francis non-works Cooper
- Entries: 5 (4 starts)
- Championships: 0
- Wins: 0
- Podiums: 0
- Career points: 0
- Pole positions: 0
- Fastest laps: 0
- First entry: 1959 Portuguese Grand Prix
- Last entry: 1964 Italian Grand Prix

Mário Manuel Veloso de Araújo Cabral (Portuguese pronunciation: [ˈmaɾiu vɨˈlozu ðɨ ɐɾɐˈuʒu kaˈβɾal]; 15 January 1934 – 17 August 2020), commonly known by the nickname "Nicha" Cabral ([ˈniʃɐ kaˈβɾaɫ]), was a racing driver from Portugal. He participated in five Formula One World Championship Grands Prix (four starts), debuting on 23 August 1959. He did not score any championship points. In 2009, at the age of 75, Cabral came out as bisexual.

== Racing career ==
Son of the second marriage of the 1st Count of Vizela, Cabral was regarded as Portugal's outstanding driver of the late 1950s and competed in the Portuguese Grand Prix in 1959 and 1960 finishing in tenth place and retiring respectively.

In the 1959 Grand Prix at the Circuito de Monsanto, Jack Brabham claimed Cabral was responsible for causing the accident which left future triple world champion lucky to escape with his life. According to Brabham, Cabral collided with the Australian while he was being lapped, causing Brabham to spin and then somersault into a telegraph post. Brabham was thrown out of the car, which landed in the middle of the circuit, but was avoided by the other drivers. Cabral, in his biography "Nicha - Mário de Araújo Cabral", made it very clear that he kept his racing line and it was Brabham that tried to overtake at a dangerous place. Cabral's car was not damaged and finished the race in tenth place, four laps down. He was the first Portuguese driver to start a Formula One race.

Cabral did not pursue a full-time racing career but drove for Scuderia Centro Sud in the 1961 Pau Grand Prix. His career was then interrupted by National Service which he spent as a paratrooper in Angola. He returned to Formula One with Centro Sud in 1963 retiring from the German Grand Prix and failing to qualify at Monza. His Formula One career ended with a retirement from the 1964 Italian Grand Prix in the Derrington-Francis-ATS.

Cabral was seriously injured in the 1965 Formula Two Rouen-Les-Essarts Grand Prix and was absent from competition until 1968 when he returned to race sportscars and occasionally in Formula Two before retiring in 1975.

== Racing record ==
=== Complete Formula One World Championship results ===
(key)

Year	Entrant	Chassis	Engine	1	2	3	4	5	6	7	8	9	10	WDC	Points
1959	Scuderia Centro Sud	Cooper T51	Maserati Straight-4	MON	500	NED	FRA	GBR	GER	POR; 10	ITA	USA		NC	0
1960	Scuderia Centro Sud	Cooper T51	Maserati Straight-4	ARG	MON	500	NED	BEL	FRA	GBR	POR; Ret	ITA	USA	NC	0
1963	Scuderia Centro Sud	Cooper T60	Climax V8	MON	BEL	NED	FRA	GBR	GER; Ret	ITA; DNQ	USA	MEX	RSA	NC	0
1964	Derrington-Francis Racing Team	Derrington-Francis	ATS V8	MON	NED	BEL	FRA	GBR	GER	AUT	ITA; Ret	USA	MEX	NC	0
