= Derrington-Francis =

British Formula One constructor

- Full name: Derrington-Francis ATS
- Base: United Kingdom
- Founder(s): Alf Francis; Vic Derrington
- Noted drivers: (Portugal) Mário de Araújo Cabral

Formula One World Championship career
- First entry: 1964 Italian Grand Prix
- Races entered: 1
- Constructors: ATS
- Engines: ATS
- Constructors' Championships: 0
- Drivers' Championships: 0
- Race victories: 0
- Podiums: 0
- Points: 0
- Pole positions: 0
- Fastest laps: 0
- Final entry: 1964 Italian Grand Prix

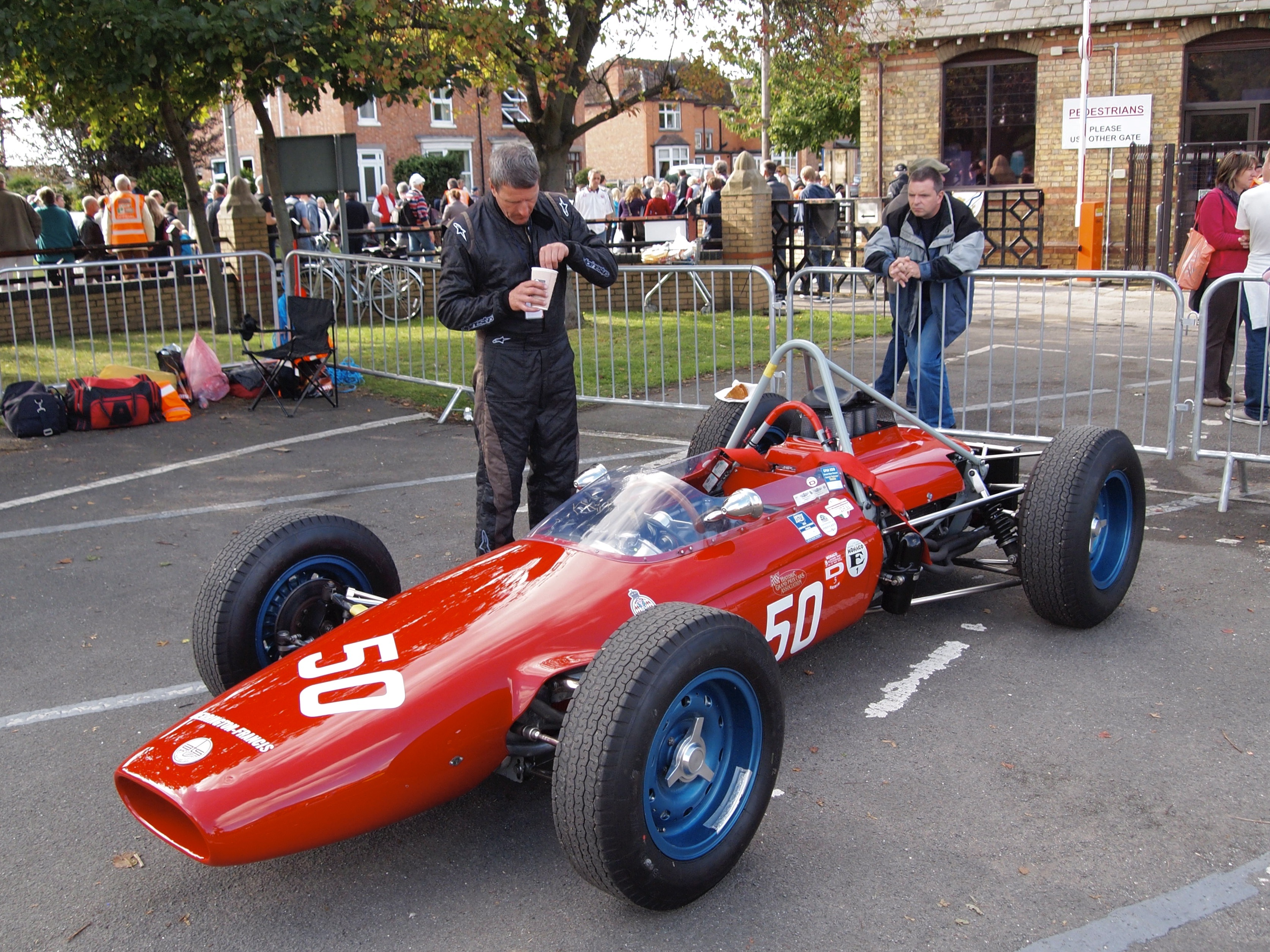
Derrington-Francis ATS, BRM Celebration Day, Bourne, Lincolnshire, 2012

Derrington-Francis Racing Team was a short-lived Formula One team from Britain. It was founded by Stirling Moss' former chief mechanic, Alf Francis, and engine tuner Vic Derrington, acquiring an old Automobili Turismo e Sport Tipo 100 car after the ATS operation had closed in 1963. The car, named the Derrington-Francis ATS after the team's founders, featured a spaceframe chassis, a short wheelbase and square-shaped aluminium body panels.

The car made its début in the 1964 Italian Grand Prix, where it was driven by Portuguese driver Mário de Araújo Cabral. Qualifying 19th on the grid, Cabral fought with Peter Revson and Maurice Trintignant for the first part of the race, before an ignition problem forced him to retire on lap 25. Cabral was to have driven the car in future events, but Dan Gurney damaged the single chassis in private testing and the team did not make another race appearance.

== Complete Formula One World Championship results ==
(key)

Year	Chassis	Engine	Tyres	Drivers	1	2	3	4	5	6	7	8	9	10	Points	WCC
1964	Derrington-Francis	ATS V8	G		MON	NED	BEL	FRA	GBR	GER	AUT	ITA	USA	MEX	0	NC
1964	Derrington-Francis	ATS V8	G	(Portugal) Mário de Araújo Cabral								Ret			0	NC
