= Le Bleu =

Studio album by Justin King
- Released: 2001

Le Bleu is the third solo album by acoustic guitarist Justin King.

Le Bleu is the name of the street on which King lived during his childhood, and thus the inspiration for the album title. Released in 2001, it was only available on King's website, since he was not signed to a label at the time. The album consists of 19 tracks, one of which contains vocals by King (Ashes), and another a violin solo (Ashokan Farewell) playing by King's close friend Linh Renken. The album is composed of tracks which are all imbued with King's renowned percussive acoustic style consisting of elements of Flamenco, Jazz, Celtic, Classical and African music. Some of the tracks such as "Seville" and "Taps" involve the playing of cultural percussive instruments such as the Tabla and Djembe drums played by childhood friend James West, also the former drummer for King's current band. The album was recorded at Peter Gabriel's Real World Studios; King's own studio, Blackberry Hill Studio, was not yet constructed. King uses a variety of guitars on the album which include seven string, classical, steel string, and flamenco.

== Track listing ==
1. "Taps"
2. "Seville"
3. "After the Harvest"
4. "A Saucey Jig"
5. "Scrabo Tower"
6. "Northwest of Ju Ju"
7. "Loco Motives"
8. "Amazing Grace"
9. "Pam and Johns House"
10. "August Train"
11. "Knock On Wood"
12. "Winter On the Hill"
13. "Ashokan Farewell"
14. "Paris Morning"
15. "Phunkdified"
16. "Childs Toy"
17. "Prinsengracht"
18. "The Mill Creek"
19. "Ashes"
