= Formula One drivers from the United Kingdom =

List of Formula One drivers from the United Kingdom

- Drivers: 164
- Grands Prix: 1155
- Entries: 4746
- Starts: 4464
- Best season finish: 1st (21 times, 1958, 1962, 1963, 1964, 1965, 1968, 1969, 1971, 1973, 1976, 1992, 1996, 2008, 2009, 2014, 2015, 2017, 2018, 2019, 2020, 2025)
- Wins: 332
- Podiums: 822
- Pole positions: 323
- Fastest laps: 291
- Points: 13,826.78
- First entry: 1950 British Grand Prix
- First win: 1953 French Grand Prix
- Latest win: 2026 São Paulo Grand Prix
- Latest entry: 2026 São Paulo Grand Prix
- 2026 drivers: Oliver Bearman; Lewis Hamilton; Arvid Lindblad; Lando Norris; George Russell

There have been 164 Formula One drivers who have represented the United Kingdom, five of whom competed in the 2026 Formula One World Championship. Eleven World Champions have driven under the UK flag. Of those, Lewis Hamilton has won the most titles, with seven putting him level with Michael Schumacher for most titles. Hamilton is still active in the sport; he has won the most races (106), recorded the most pole positions (105) and amassed the most points (5279.5) of any driver representing the UK.

== World champions and race winners ==
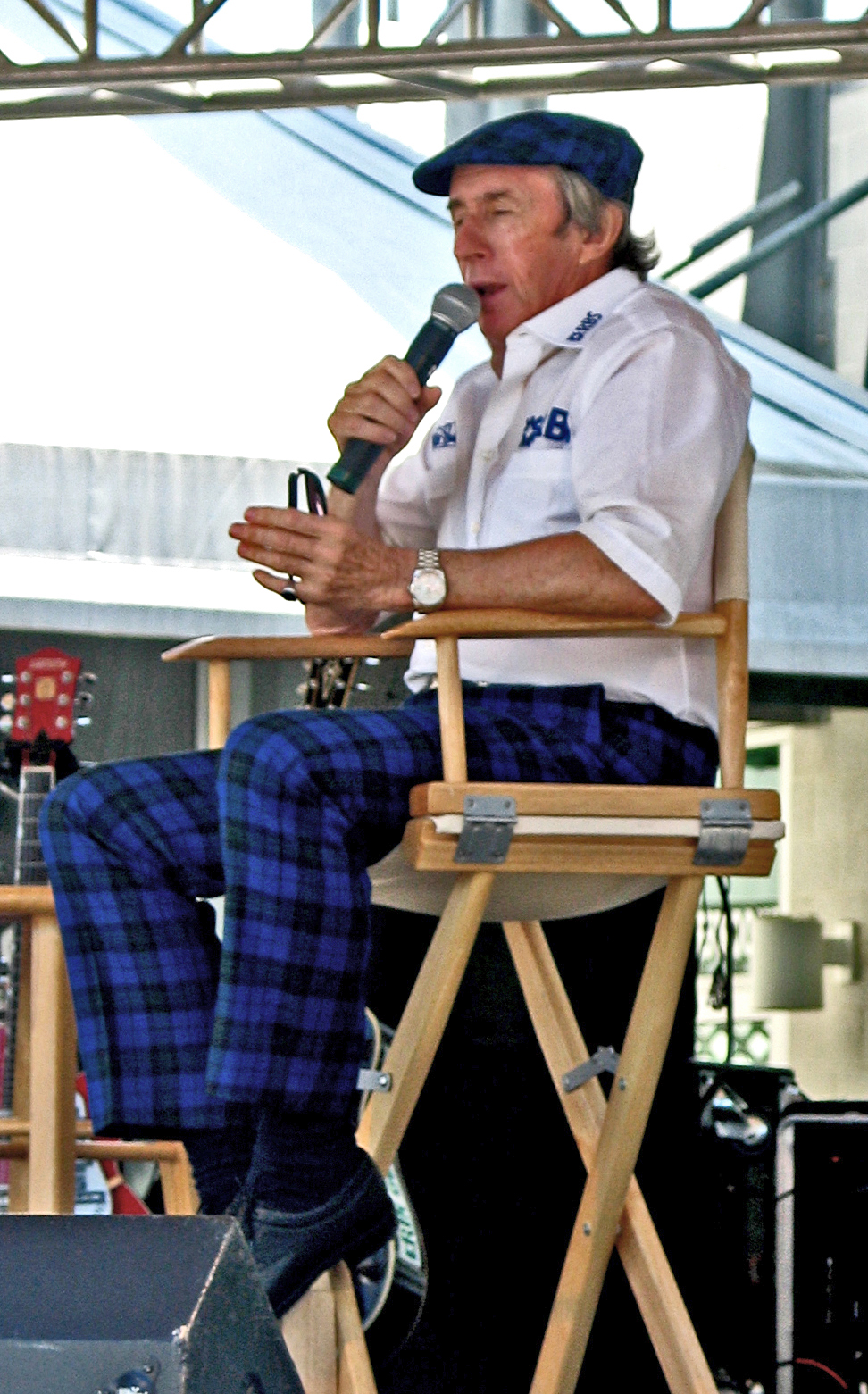
Jackie Stewart won three world champion titles

There have been eleven Formula One World Drivers' Champions representing the United Kingdom, winning a total of 21 titles between them. The first British champion was Mike Hawthorn, who in 1958 became only the fourth different person to win the title. In the 15 seasons between 1962 and 1976 the title was won by a driver representing the UK nine times: Graham Hill (1962, 1968), Jim Clark (1963, 1965), John Surtees (1964), Jackie Stewart (1969, 1971, 1973), and James Hunt (1976). Despite these successes, it wasn't until 2015 that a champion representing the UK retained their title, when Lewis Hamilton achieved this, following on from his victory in 2014. Hunt's victory was the last title until 1992, Nigel Mansell's winning season. Graham Hill's son Damon won in 1996 before another lengthy period without a world champion representing the UK. Lewis Hamilton won by just one point in 2008, with Jenson Button winning the following year, in 2009. Lewis Hamilton became the fourth multiple world champion representing the UK when he won his second title in 2014. Lando Norris won the title in 2025 by just 2 points.

The British Grand Prix has been won by twelve drivers representing the UK: Stirling Moss, Peter Collins, Clark, Stewart, Hunt, John Watson, Mansell, Damon Hill, Johnny Herbert, David Coulthard, Hamilton and Norris who have won the event 26 times between them. Nine other men representing the UK have also won Formula One races, but never the British Grand Prix. These are Hawthorn, Tony Brooks, Innes Ireland, Graham Hill, Surtees, Peter Gethin, Eddie Irvine, Button and George Russell.

List of British Formula One World Champions
Name	Year(s) of title(s)
Mike Hawthorn	1958
Graham Hill	1962, 1968
Jim Clark	1963, 1965
John Surtees	1964
Jackie Stewart	1969, 1971, 1973
James Hunt	1976
Nigel Mansell	1992
Damon Hill	1996
Lewis Hamilton	2008, 2014, 2015, 2017, 2018, 2019, 2020
Jenson Button	2009
Lando Norris	2025

== Current drivers ==
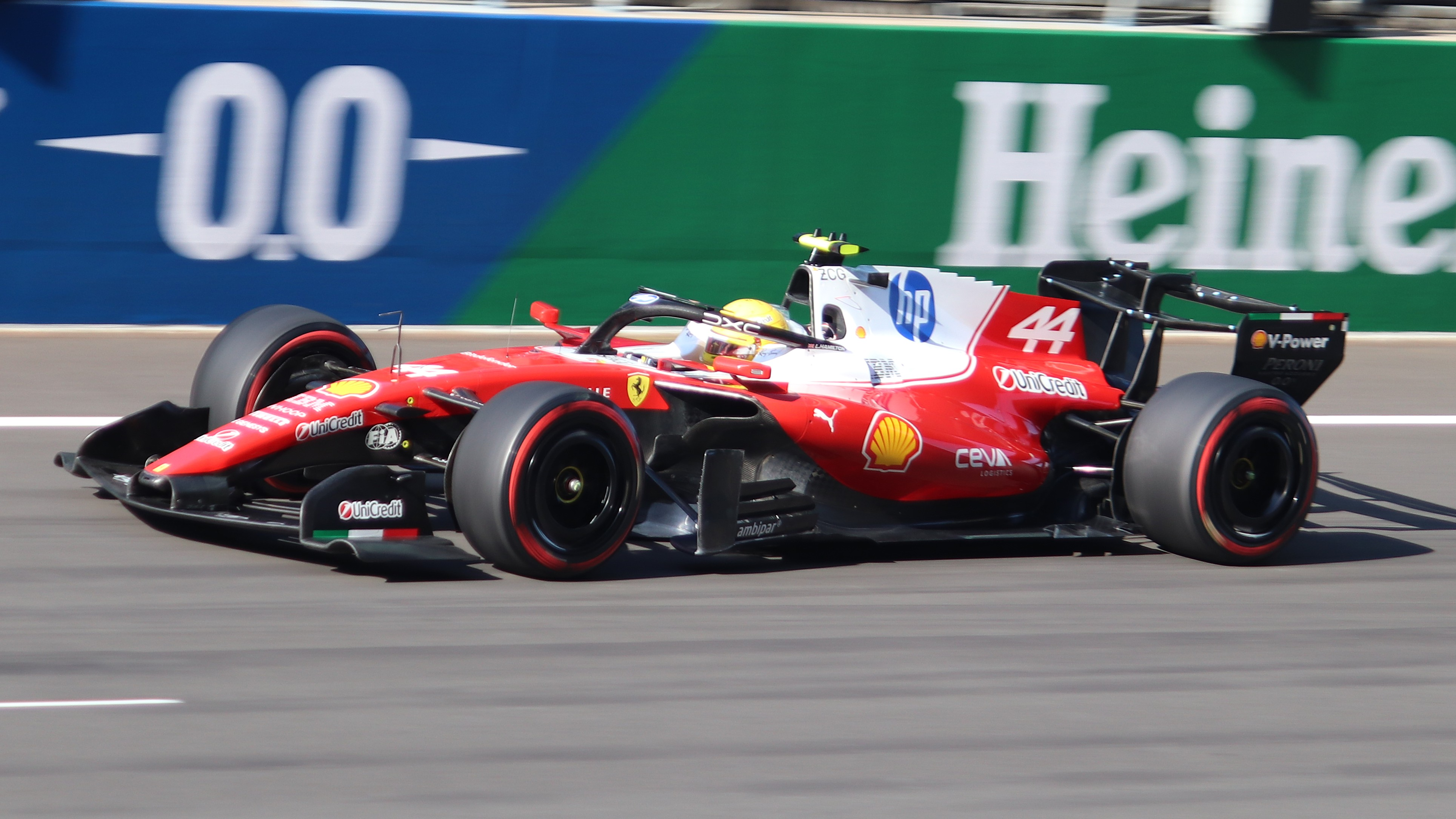
Lewis Hamilton in a Ferrari at the 2026 Chinese Grand Prix

Lewis Hamilton made his debut with McLaren in 2007. He managed to finish on the podium in each of his first nine races: a record which stands to this day. He achieved his first win at the 2007 Canadian Grand Prix and came within one point of winning the world title in his rookie season. He made up for this defeat in his second year, winning the 2008 title by a single point. He continued to race for McLaren until the end of the 2012 season, and won races in each of his six seasons with the team. He moved to Mercedes for the 2013 season and broke what had been Nigel Mansell's national record, with a total of 106 Grand Prix wins, the most in Formula One. He moved to Scuderia Ferrari for 2025. Hamilton has been described as the best driver of his generation, and one of the greatest Formula One drivers of all time.

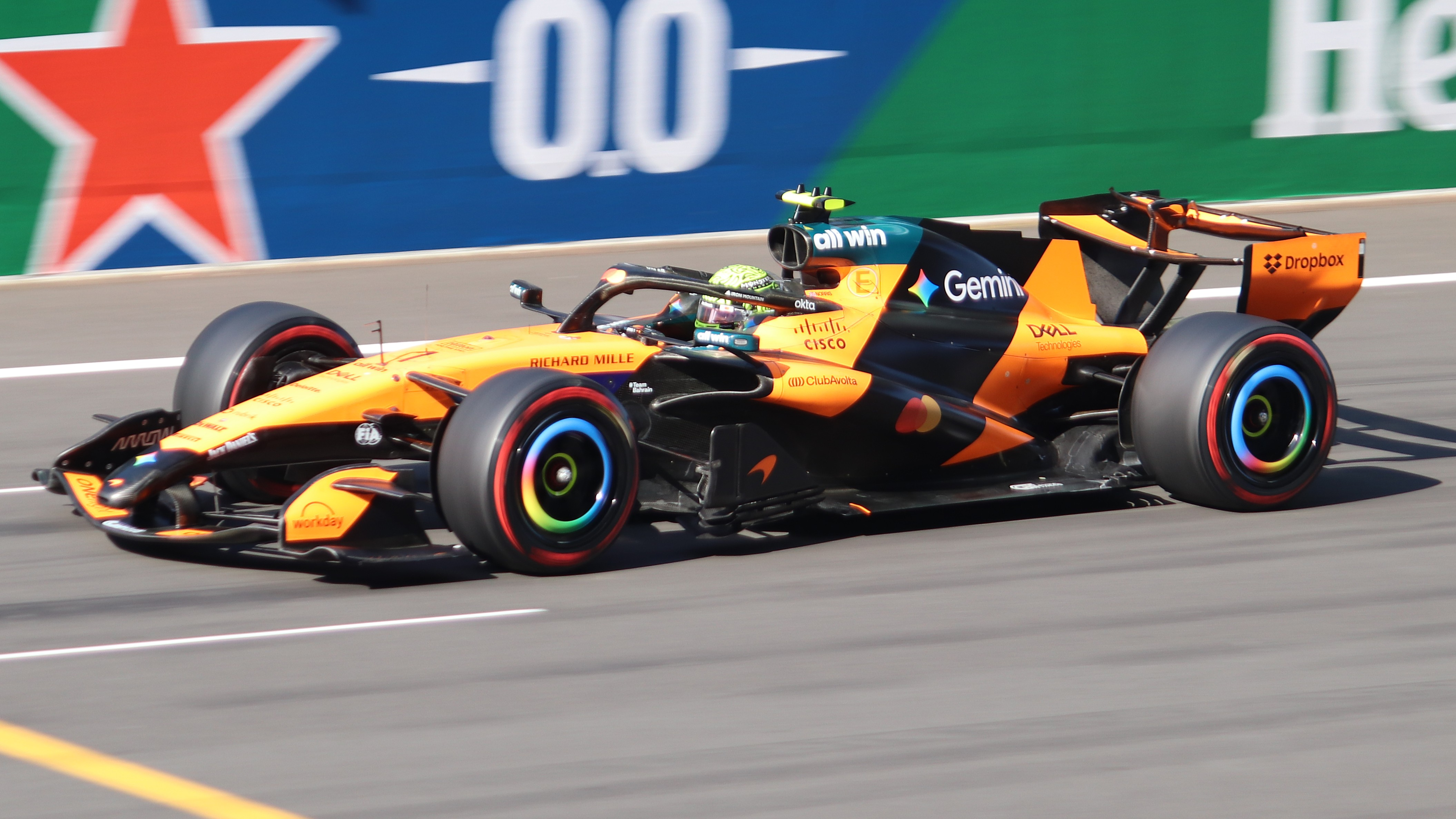
Lando Norris in a McLaren at the 2026 Chinese Grand Prix

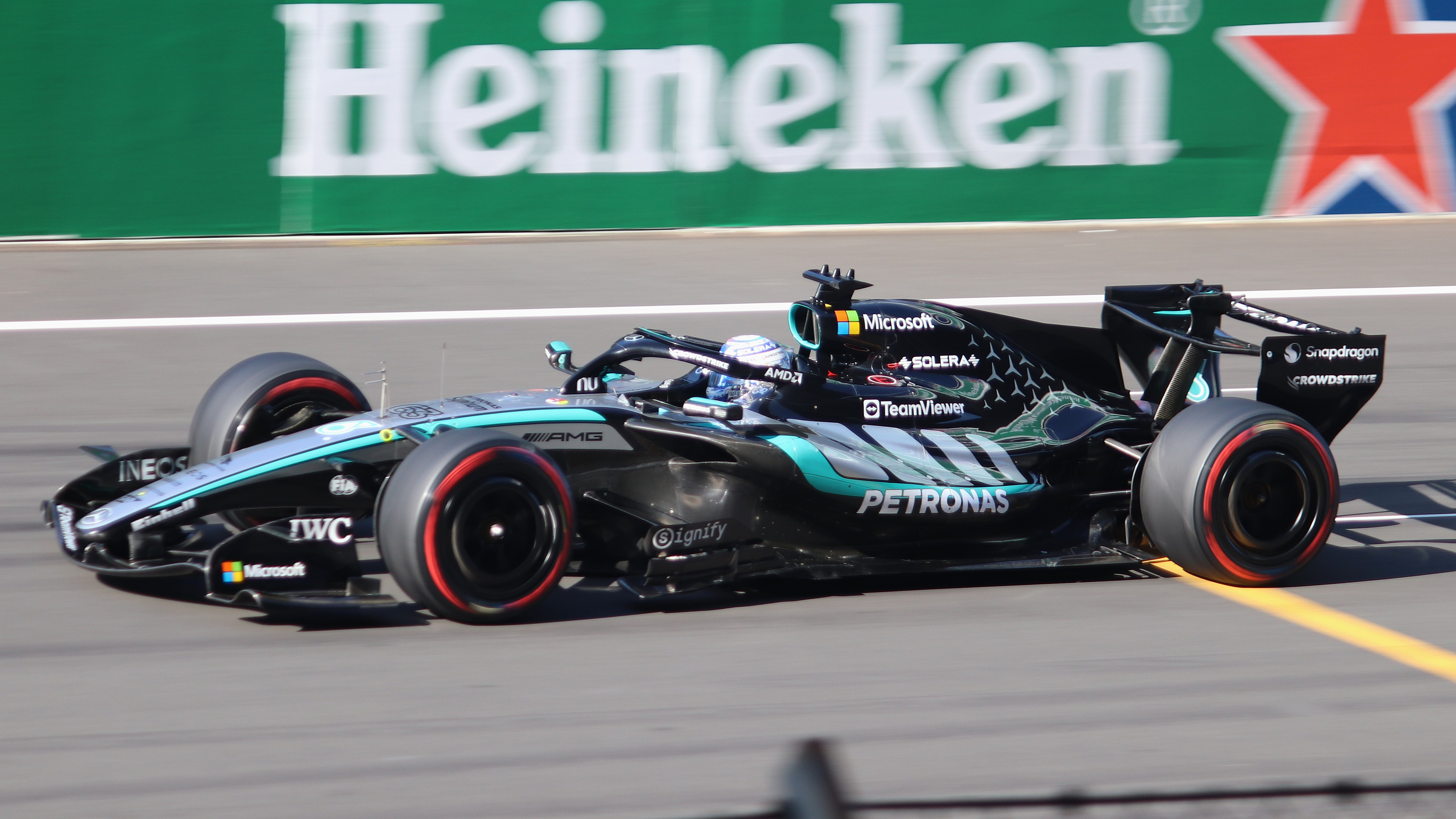
George Russell in a Mercedes at the 2026 Chinese Grand Prix

Lando Norris and George Russell made their Formula One debuts at the 2019 Australian Grand Prix for McLaren and Williams respectively. Russell currently drives for Mercedes, replacing Valtteri Bottas after the 2021 season, and is contracted with them until the end of 2026. Norris is contracted to drive for McLaren until the end of 2027.

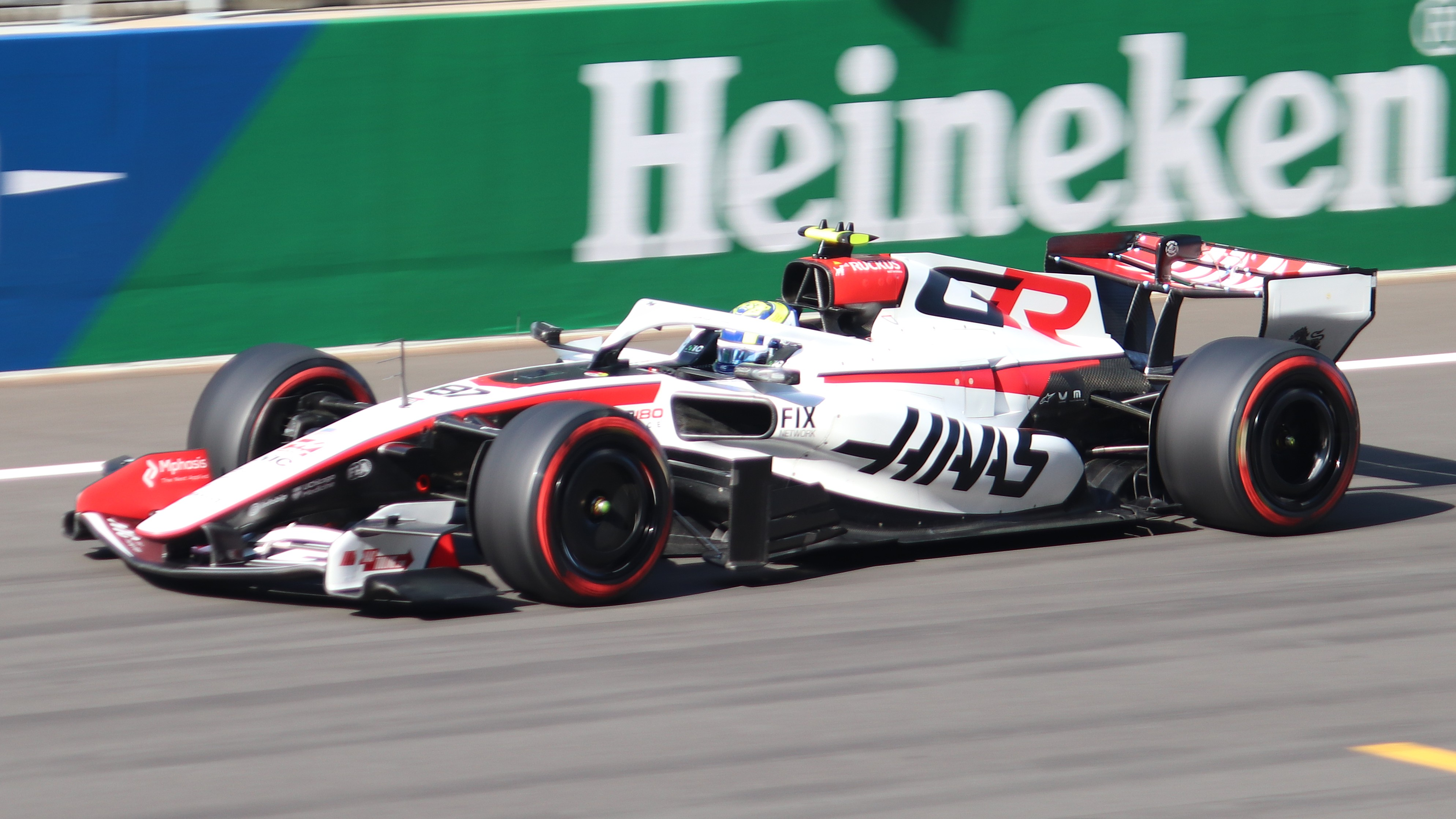
Oliver Bearman in a Haas at the 2026 Chinese Grand Prix

Oliver Bearman made his Formula One debut at the 2024 Saudi Arabian Grand Prix for Ferrari, deputising for Carlos Sainz Jr. He made two further appearances in 2024 substituting for Kevin Magnussen. He is contracted with Haas until the end of 2026.

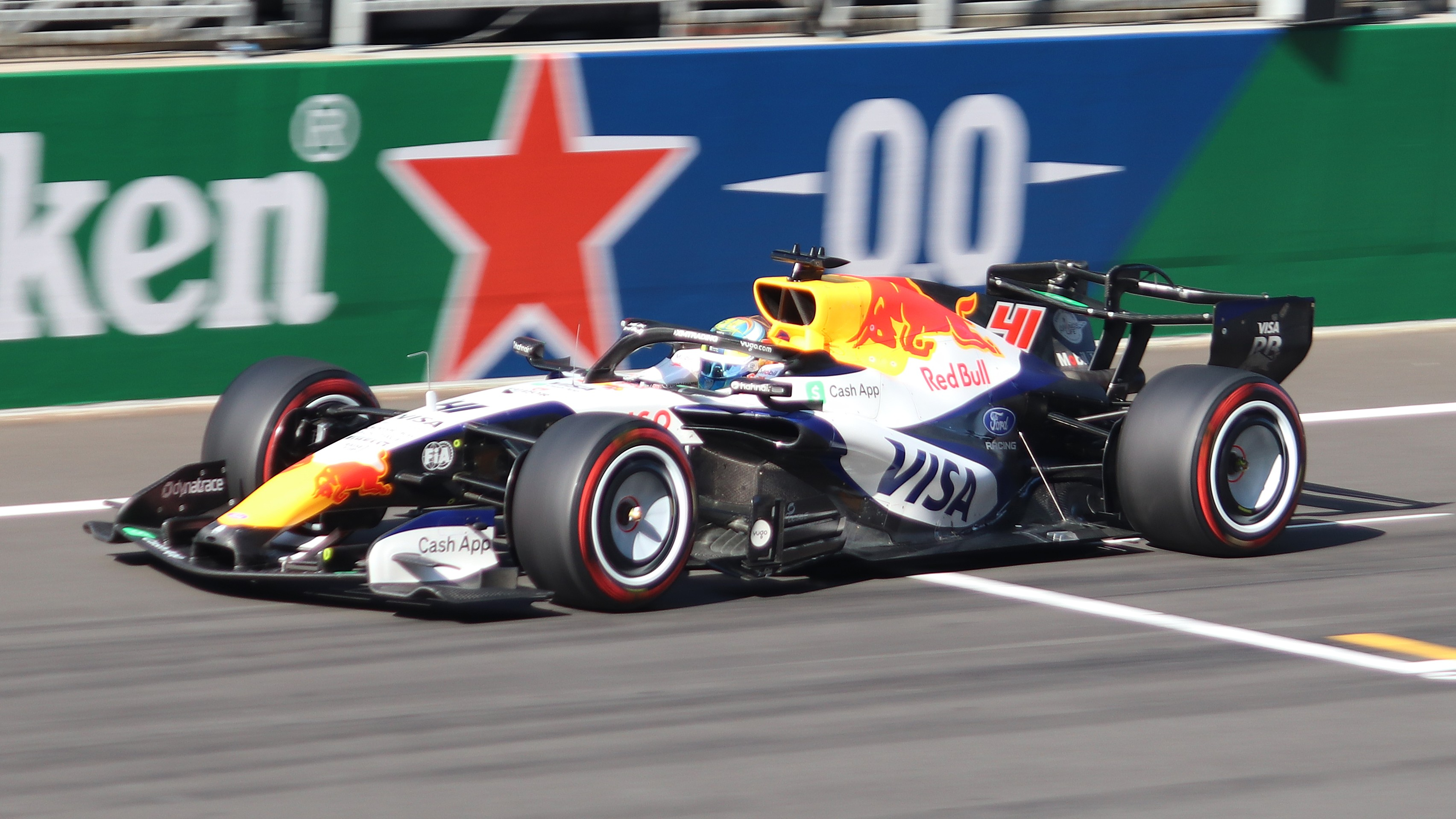
Arvid Lindblad in a Racing Bulls at the 2026 Chinese Grand Prix

Arvid Lindblad made his Formula One debut at the 2026 Australian Grand Prix for Racing Bulls after being promoted from Formula 2.

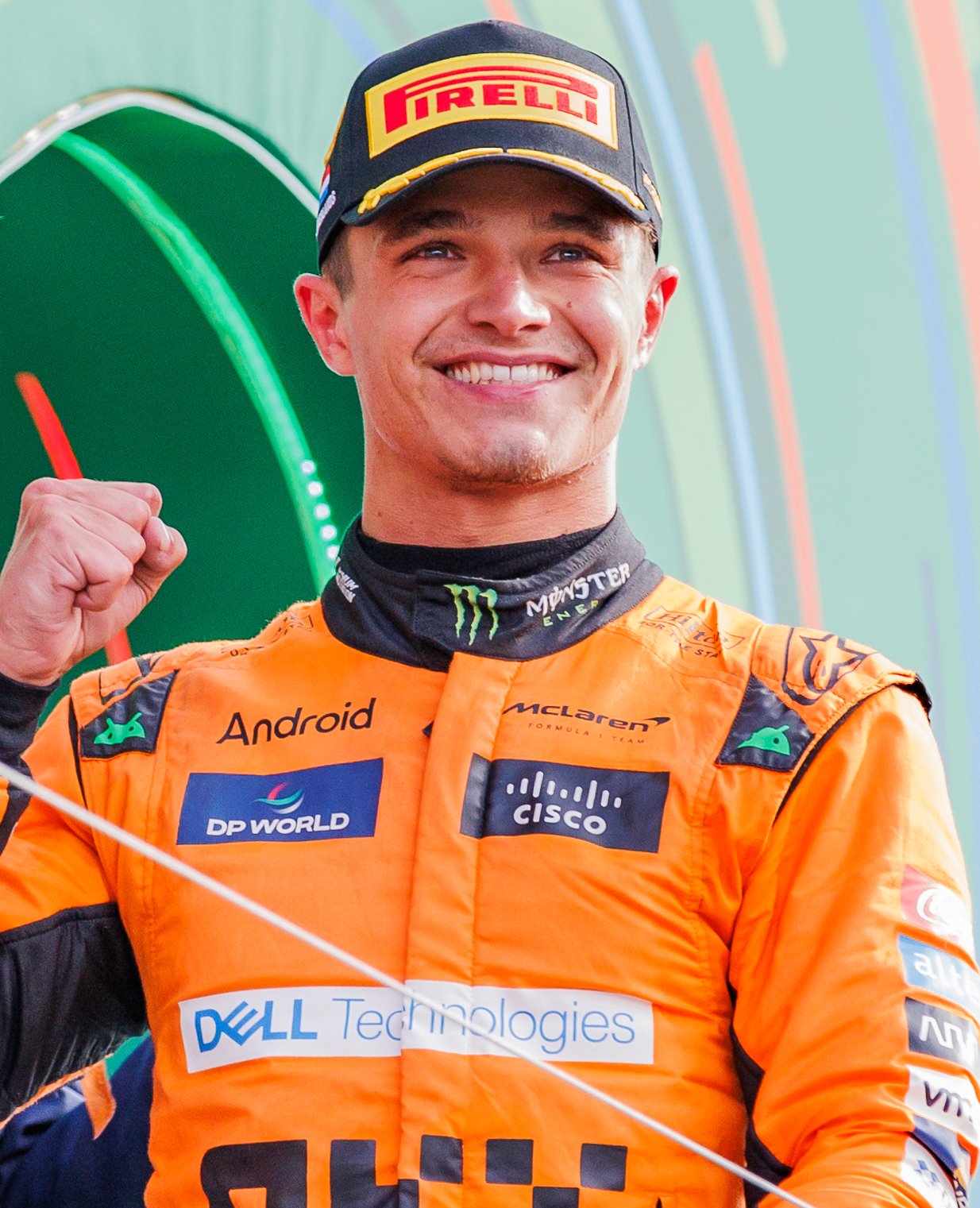
Lando Norris
2026 season position: 6th

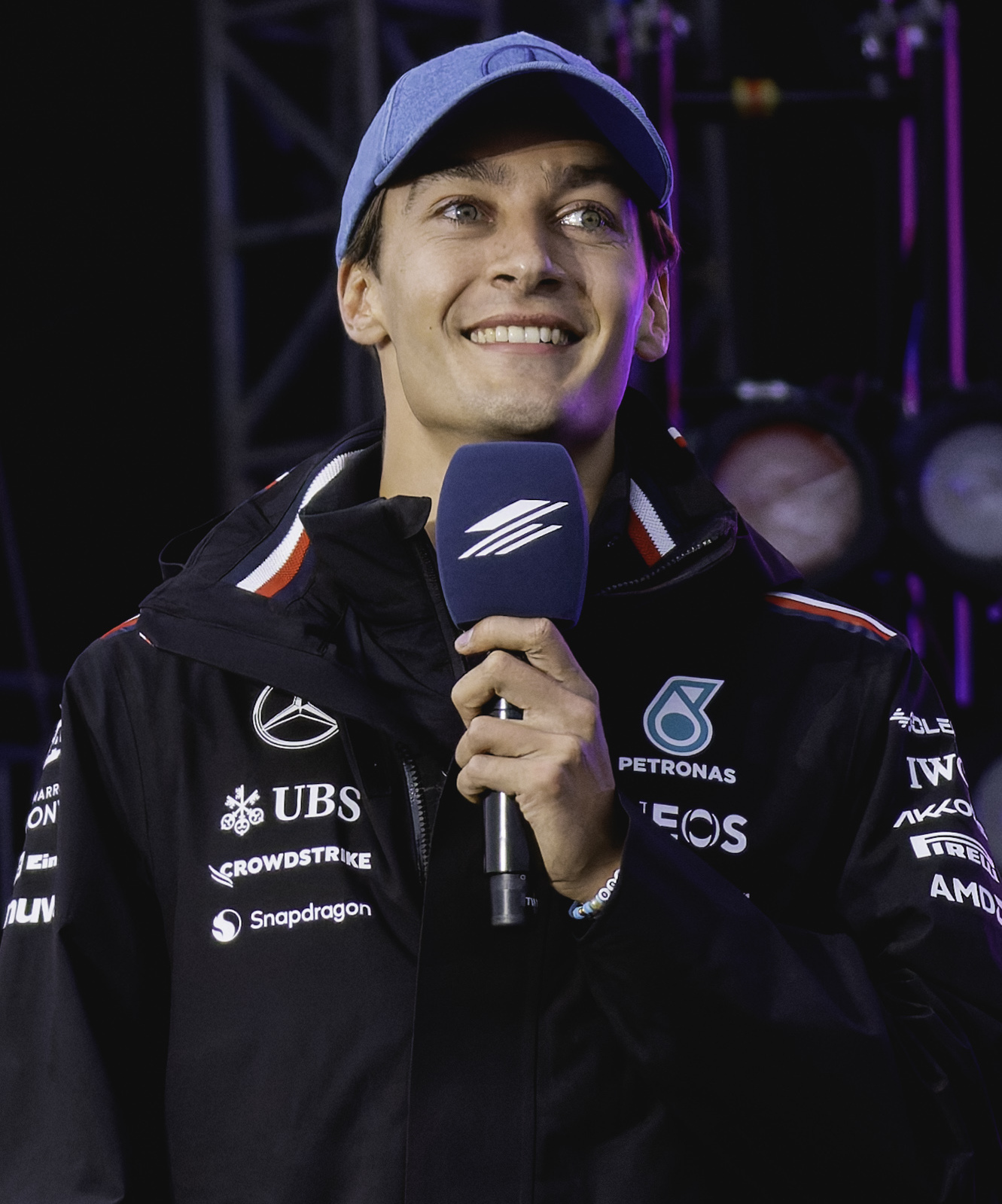
George Russell
2026 season position: 3rd

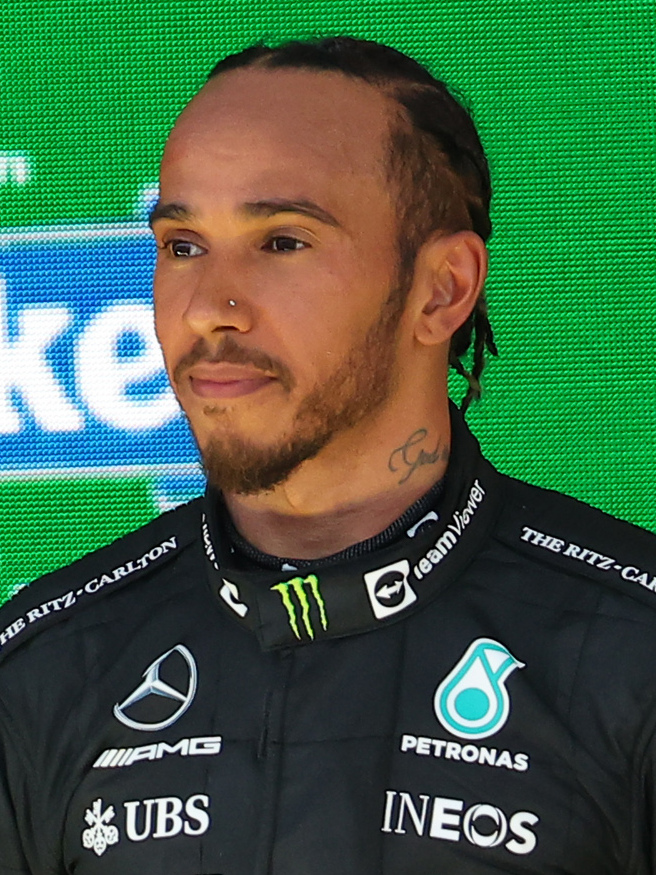
Lewis Hamilton
2026 season position: 4th

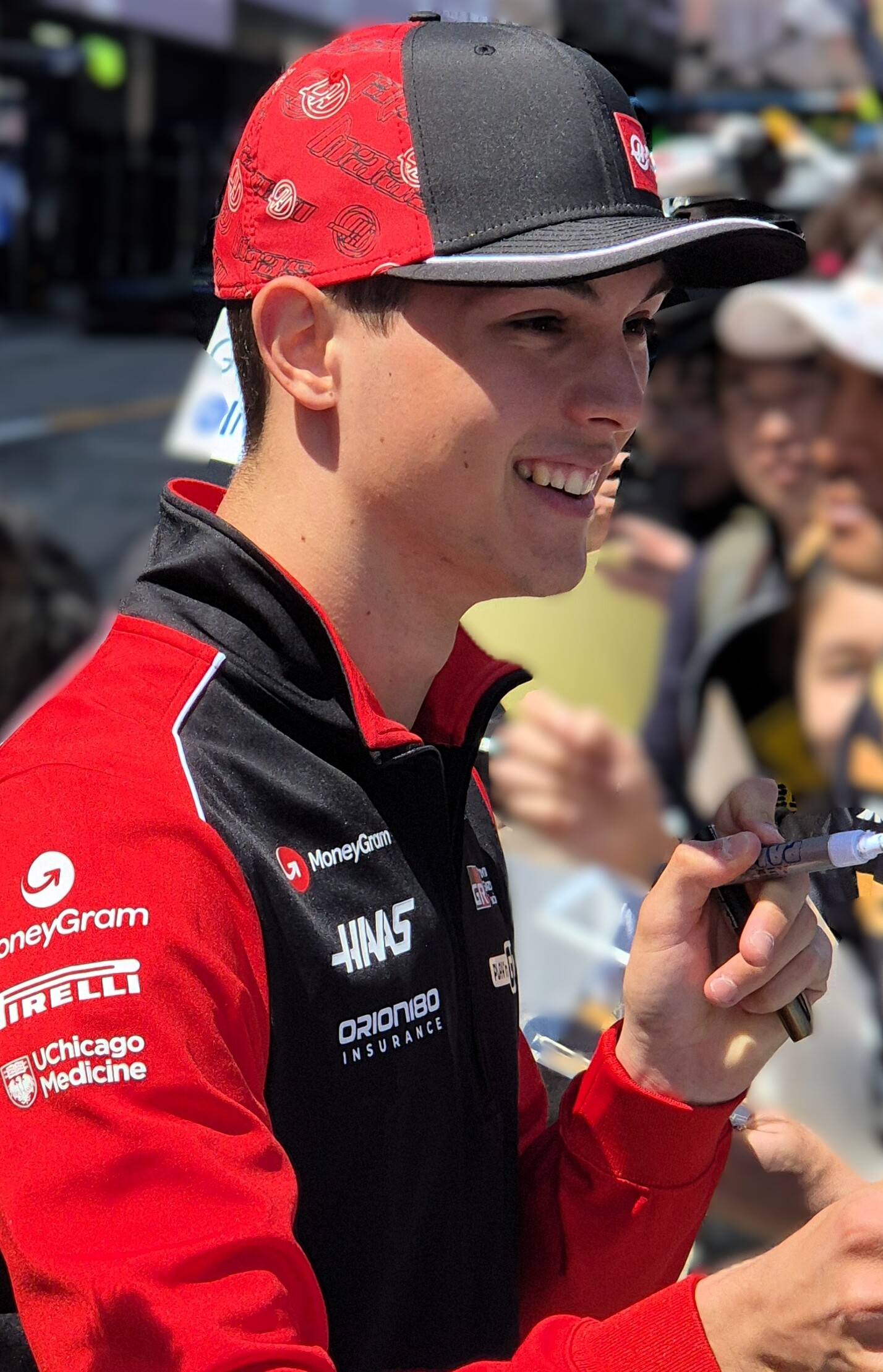
Oliver Bearman
2026 season position: 13th

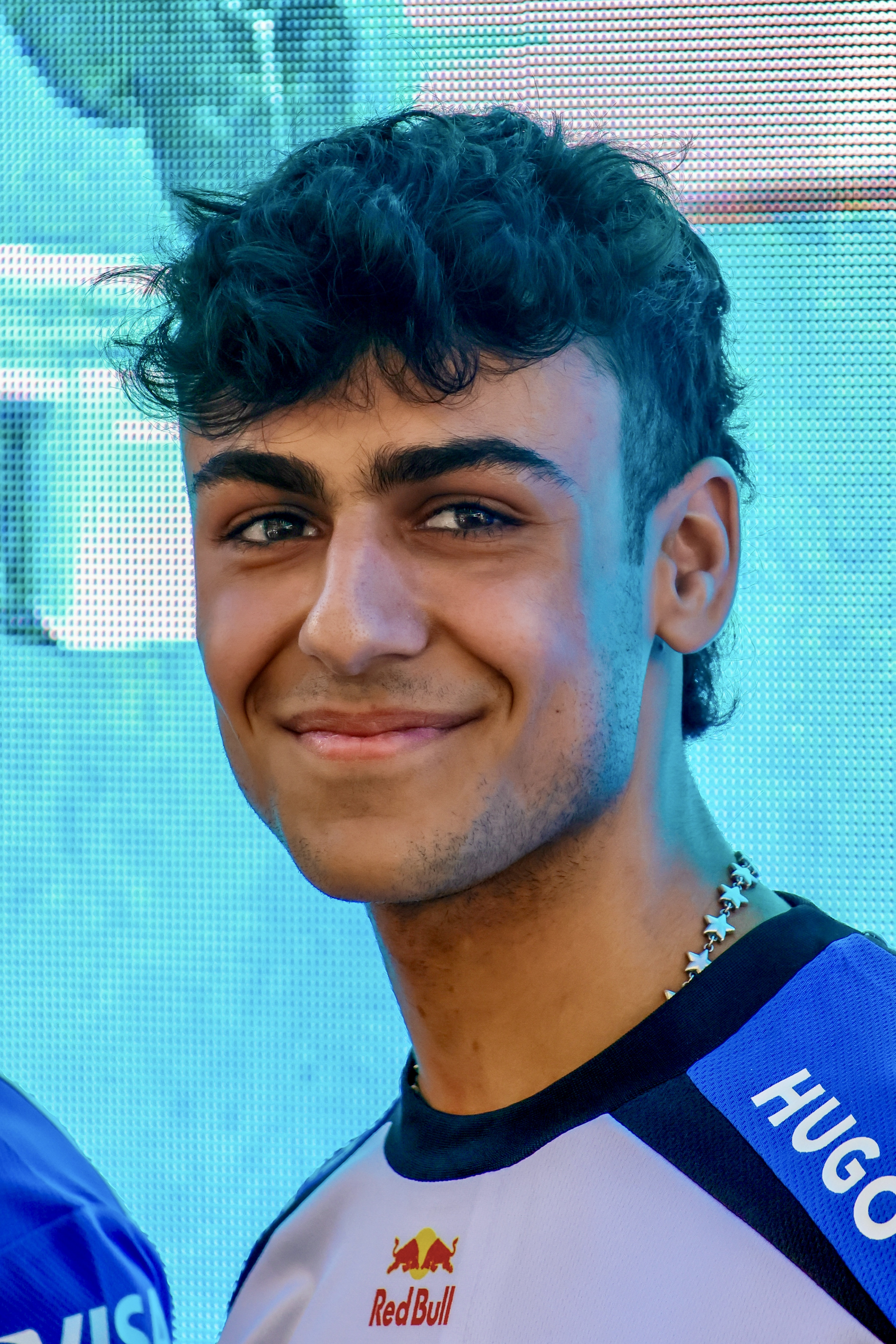
Arvid Lindblad
2026 season position: 11th

== Former drivers ==
=== Notable former drivers ===
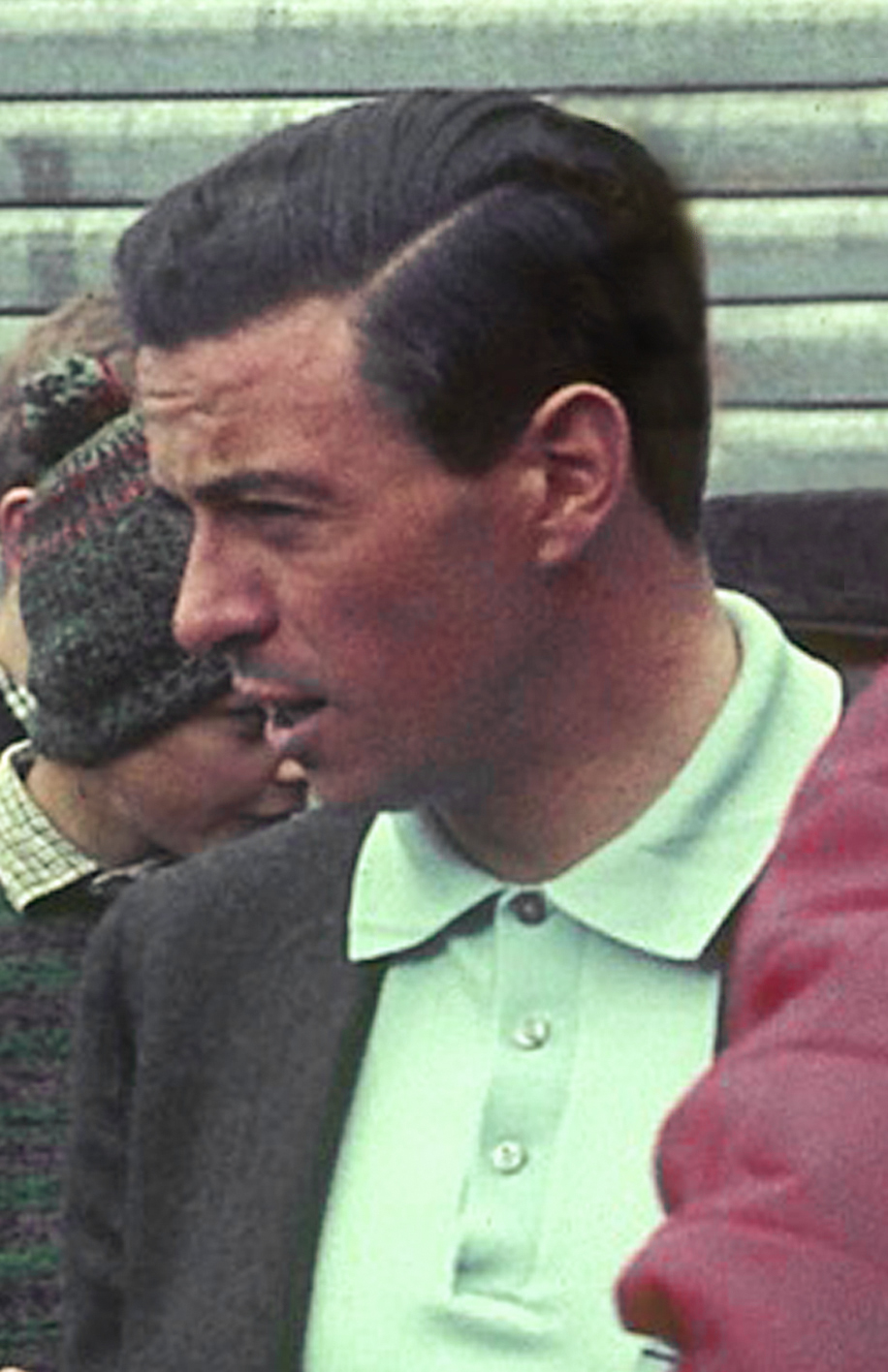
Jim Clark in 1966

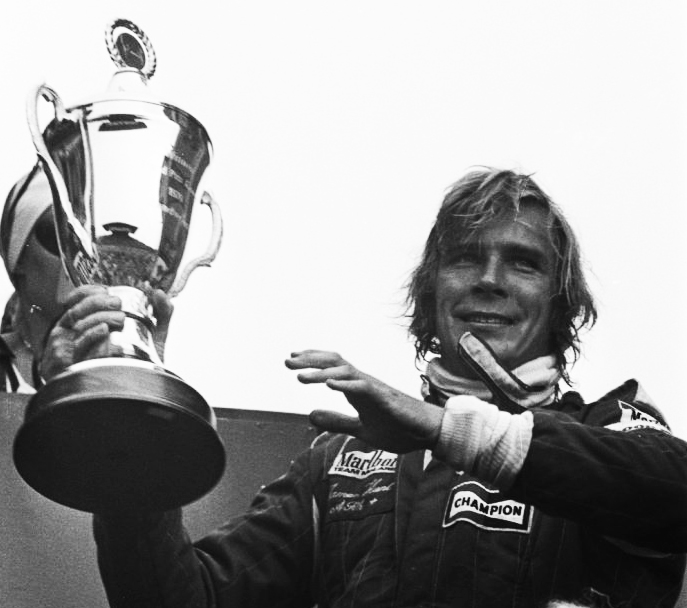
James Hunt at the 1976 Dutch Grand Prix

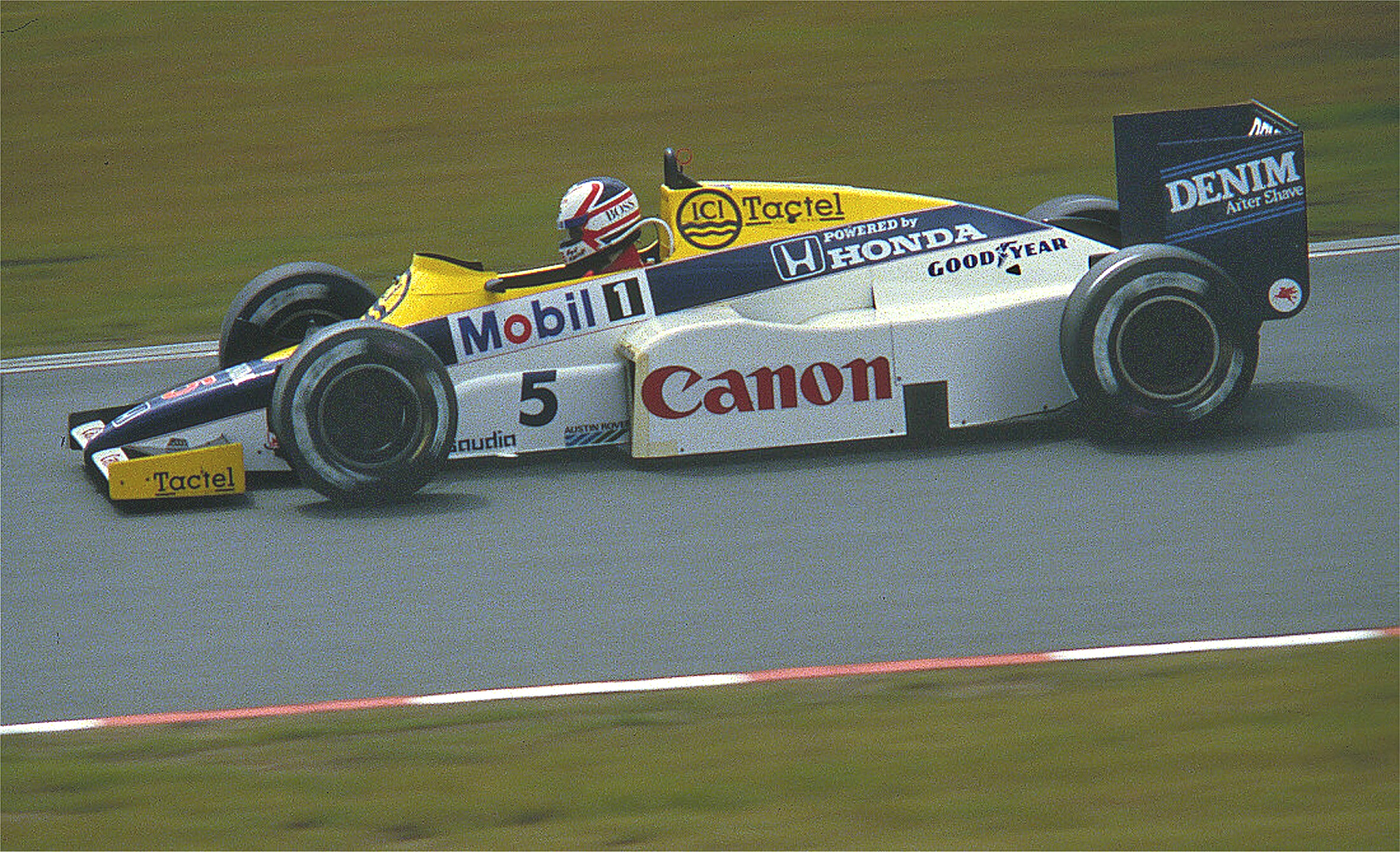
Nigel Mansell in a Williams in 1985

Scotsman Jim Clark is one of the most highly regarded drivers in the history of the sport. He had won two world championships, missing out on two others due to car failure. He died on 7 April 1968 at an F2 race in Hockenheim after his Lotus suffered a tyre failure. His hall of fame entry on the official Formula One site summarises that "Few champions were as dominant. Fewer still are remembered so fondly." An Autosport survey taken by 217 Formula One drivers saw Clark voted as the fifth greatest F1 driver of all time just ahead of fellow Scottish driver Jackie Stewart.

Jackie Stewart won in 1969, 1971, and 1973. By the time of his retirement he had won 27 races, a record that would stand until finally being bettered by Alain Prost in 1987. Stewart remained highly active with the sport, running his own team and being one of the most vocal proponents for the improvement of safety standards in Formula One.

Stirling Moss has been called the "greatest all-round racing driver" for his successes in sportscars, touring cars, and rallying as well as Formula One. He finished second in the championship in four successive seasons (1955 to 1958) and has therefore been given the title of "the greatest British driver never to win a world title".

Mike Hawthorn was the first British world championship title winner, beating Moss to the 1958 title by just one point. He remains one of only two drivers who won the title with only one race win, the other being Keke Rosberg. Though he won the season he was disillusioned with the sport, having seen Ferrari teammate Peter Collins die in an accident at Nürburgring. Hawthorn had been reluctant to complete the season and quit Formula One immediately after the final race. Just a few months later, in January 1959, Hawthorn died when his speeding Jaguar skidded off a wet road.

Nigel Mansell has won 31 Grands Prix, placing him seventh in the overall race winners' list and making him, by that measure, the second most successful British driver after Lewis Hamilton. He also holds the record for the most races completed in his career before finally winning a world championship. Mansell made his debut in 1980 and came close to winning the title in both 1986 and 1987. He eventually achieved the success in 1992 in some style, securing the title in August, the earliest that it had ever been decided. Mansell left to join CART in 1993, winning the championship in his debut season and making him the only person to hold both the CART and F1 titles at the same time. He briefly returned to Formula One for the end of the 1994 season and the start of 1995.

Graham Hill started 176 races, all of which were in British-built cars. His long career lasted for 17 seasons, ending in 1975 when he died in a plane crash. He won the driver's title in 1962 with BRM and 1968 with Team Lotus. His son, Damon Hill, followed him into the sport, making his debut in 1992 for Brabham. He was described by team boss Frank Williams as "a tough bastard" and went on to win the championship with Williams in 1996. Despite that success he was dropped by the team and moved to the uncompetitive Arrows and later Jordan winning once more before retiring.

James Hunt was a British racing driver who won the Formula One World Championship in 1976. Hunt was notorious for his unconventional behaviour on and off the track, which earned him a reputation for cavalier indulgence in both alcohol and sex. Having been part of Formula One when the series was consolidating its global popularity, Hunt's image was the epitome of the unruly, playboy driver, with a touch of English eccentricity. The movie Rush is centered on the rivalry between James Hunt and Niki Lauda during the 1976 Formula One motor-racing season.

John Surtees was a multi-title winning motorcyclist before moving to four wheels. His 1960 debut saw him qualify in pole position in his third race and he would go on to win the championship title with Ferrari in 1964. He remains the only person to have won world championships on both two and four wheels.

Tony Brooks, a qualified dentist, made his debut in 1956 for BRM. In his first race, the 1956 British Grand Prix, he was involved in a serious crash, being thrown from the car and breaking his jaw. At the 1957 British Grand Prix Brooks was in second place when he was called into the pits. He stepped out of the car and gave it to teammate Stirling Moss whose own car had developed technical problems. Moss rejoined in ninth and went on to win the race. This marked the first world championship victory for a British car, fittingly driven by two British drivers at the British Grand Prix. Brooks retired from Formula One in 1961 over safety concerns saying "I felt I had a moral responsibility to take reasonable care of my life".

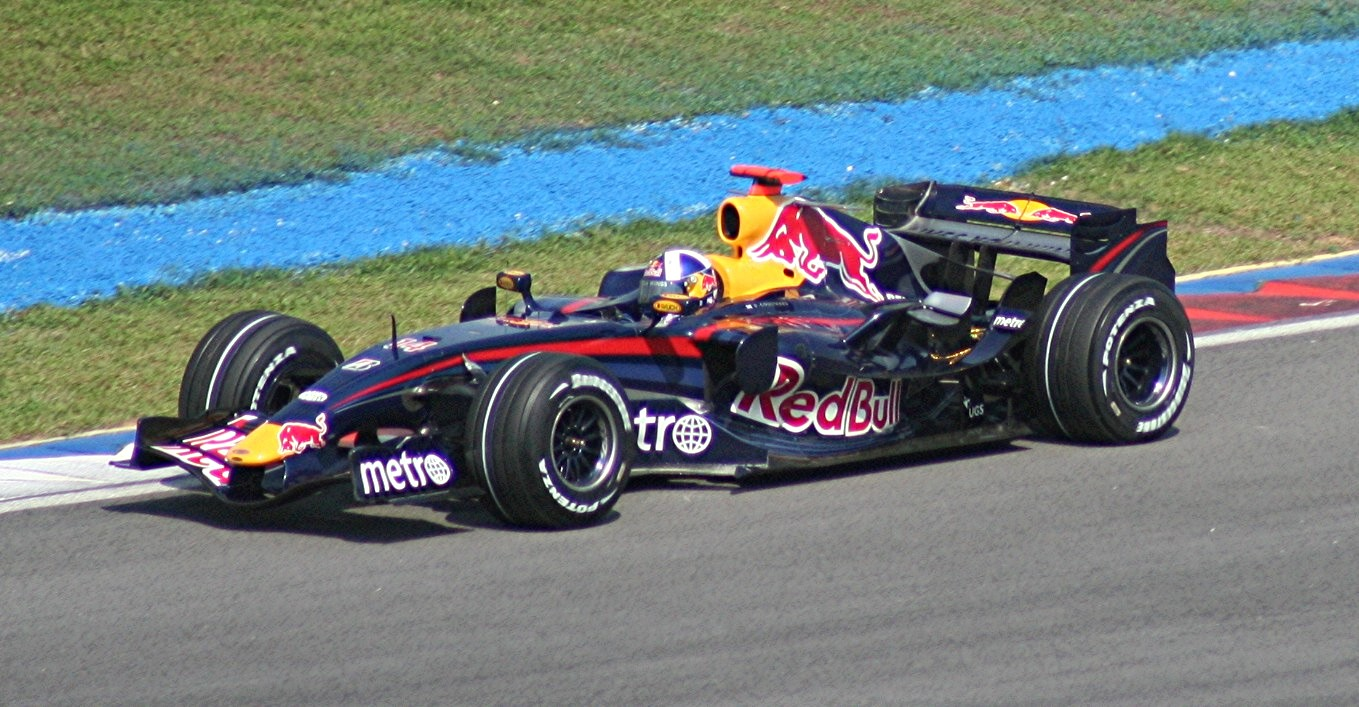
Coulthard driving for Red Bull at the 2007 Malaysian Grand Prix

David Coulthard came into F1 as a replacement for Ayrton Senna after Senna's death in 1994. He went on to finish in the top-three in the world championship five times throughout his career. Compared to other British drivers, Coulthard had competed in the most races (246) and amassed the highest points total (535) at the time of his retirement at the end of the 2008 season.

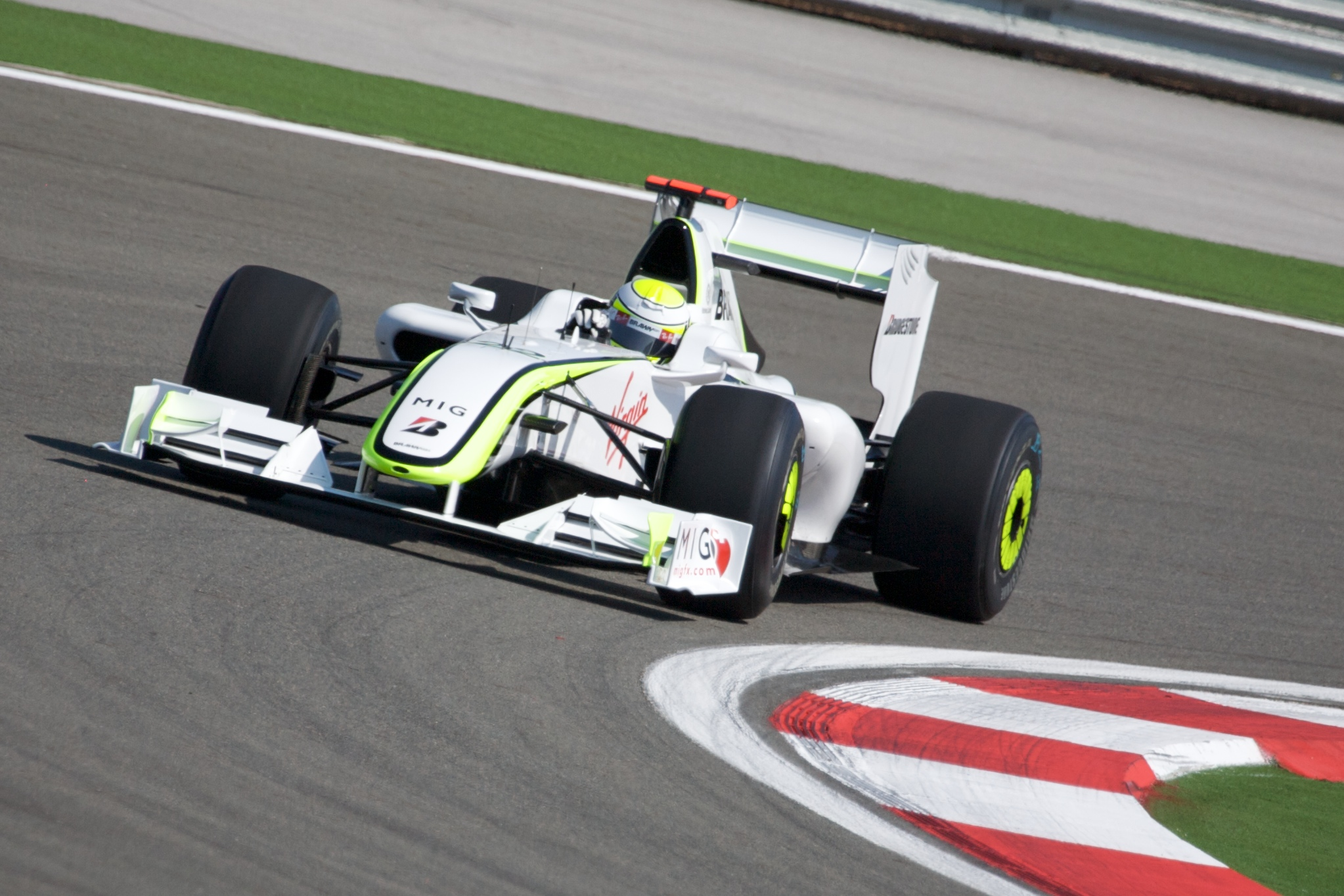
Button driving for Brawn GP at the 2009 Turkish Grand Prix

Jenson Button made his Formula One debut in 2000 at the age of 20, making him the youngest British driver to compete in the sport until Lando Norris made his debut in the 2019 F1 season. He started his career with Williams, scoring a point in his second race. He would later race for British American Racing, a team that would then be purchased by Honda with whom he would win his first race, the 2006 Hungarian Grand Prix. Following the 2008 season, Honda decided to withdraw from F1, and the team was saved by a management buyout. The team returned as Brawn GP and saw immediate success. Button went on to achieve his most significant F1 successes, winning six of the first seven races in 2009 on the way to the world title. In 2010, he moved to McLaren, for whom he raced until the end of his career. He retired at the end of the 2016 season but raced in the 2017 Monaco Grand Prix as a replacement driver for Fernando Alonso, who was participating in the 2017 Indianapolis 500.

=== Other former drivers ===
In addition to those detailed above, the following drivers started at least ten races:

- Cliff Allison
- Bob Anderson
- Peter Arundell
- Richard Attwood
- Mike Beuttler
- Mark Blundell
- Tony Brise
- Martin Brundle
- Ian Burgess
- Max Chilton
- Peter Collins
- Piers Courage
- Anthony Davidson
- Paul di Resta
- Martin Donnelly
- Johnny Dumfries
- Guy Edwards
- Vic Elford
- Bob Evans
- Jack Fairman
- Ron Flockhart
- Peter Gethin
- Horace Gould
- Brian Henton
- Mike Hailwood
- Johnny Herbert
- David Hobbs
- Innes Ireland
- Eddie Irvine
- Chris Irwin
- Rupert Keegan
- Stuart Lewis-Evans
- Lance Macklin
- Allan McNish
- John Miles
- Jackie Oliver
- Jolyon Palmer
- Jonathan Palmer
- Tom Pryce
- Brian Redman
- Roy Salvadori
- Mike Spence
- Will Stevens
- Trevor Taylor
- Derek Warwick
- John Watson
- Ken Wharton
- Peter Whitehead
- Justin Wilson

== Statistics ==
Drivers	Active Years	Entries	Wins	Podiums	Career Points	Poles	Fastest Laps	Championships
Geoffrey Crossley	1950	2	0	0	0	0	0	0
Joe Fry	1950	1	0	0	0	0	0	0
David Hampshire	1950	2	0	0	0	0	0	0
Cuth Harrison	1950	3	0	0	0	0	0	0
Leslie Johnson	1950	1	0	0	0	0	0	0
Brian Shawe-Taylor	1950–1951	3 (1 start)	0	0	0	0	0	0
Bob Gerard	1950–1951, 1953–1954, 1956–1957	8	0	0	0	0	0	0
Peter Walker	1950–1951, 1955	4 (3 starts)	0	0	0	0	0	0
David Murray	1950–1952	5 (4 starts)	0	0	0	0	0	0
Reg Parnell	1950–1952, 1954	7 (6 starts)	0	1	9	0	0	0
Peter Whitehead	1950–1954	12 (10 starts)	0	1	4	0	0	0
Tony Rolt	1950, 1953, 1955	3 (2 starts)	0	0	0	0	0	0
Philip Fotheringham-Parker	1951	1	0	0	0	0	0	0
John James	1951	1	0	0	0	0	0	0
Ken Richardson	1951	1 (0 starts)	0	0	0	0	0	0
George Abecassis	1951–1952	2	0	0	0	0	0	0
Duncan Hamilton	1951–1953	5	0	0	0	0	0	0
Stirling Moss	1951–1961	67 (66 starts)	16	24	185.64 (186.64)	16	19	0
Bill Aston	1952	2 (1 start)	0	0	0	0	0	0
Ken Downing	1952	2	0	0	0	0	0	0
Robin Montgomerie-Charrington	1952	1	0	0	0	0	0	0
Dennis Poore	1952	2	0	0	3	0	0	0
Eric Thompson	1952	1	0	0	2	0	0	0
Graham Whitehead	1952	1	0	0	0	0	0	0
Tony Crook	1952–1953	2	0	0	0	0	0	0
Kenneth McAlpine	1952–1953, 1955	7	0	0	0	0	0	0
Alan Brown	1952–1954	9 (8 starts)	0	0	0	0	0	0
Lance Macklin	1952–1955	15 (13 starts)	0	1	8	0	0	0
Ken Wharton	1952–1955	16 (15 starts)	0	0	3	0	0	0
Peter Collins	1952–1958	35 (32 starts)	3	9	47	0	0	0
Mike Hawthorn	1952–1958	47 (45 starts)	3	18	112.64 (127.64)	4	6	1 (1958)
Roy Salvadori	1952–1962	50 (47 starts)	0	2	19	0	0	0
Eric Brandon	1952, 1954	5	0	0	0	0	0	0
John Barber	1953	1	0	0	0	0	0	0
Rodney Nuckey	1953	2 (1 start)	0	0	0	0	0	0
Ian Stewart	1953	1	0	0	0	0	0	0
Jimmy Stewart	1953	1	0	0	0	0	0	0
Jack Fairman	1953, 1955–1961	13 (12 starts)	0	0	5	0	0	0
Don Beauman	1954	1	0	0	0	0	0	0
John Riseley-Prichard	1954	1	0	0	0	0	0	0
Leslie Thorne	1954	1	0	0	0	0	0	0
Bill Whitehouse	1954	1	0	0	0	0	0	0
Leslie Marr	1954–1955	2	0	0	0	0	0	0
Horace Gould	1954–1958, 1960	18 (14 starts)	0	0	2	0	0	0
Ron Flockhart	1954, 1956–1960	14 (12 starts)	0	1	5	0	0	0
Ted Whiteaway	1955	1 (0 starts)	0	0	0	0	0	0
Colin Chapman	1956	1 (0 starts)	0	0	0	0	0	0
Archie Scott Brown	1956	1	0	0	0	0	0	0
Desmond Titterington	1956	1	0	0	0	0	0	0
Les Leston	1956–1957	3 (2 starts)	0	0	0	0	0	0
Bruce Halford	1956–1957, 1959–1960	9 (8 starts)	0	0	0	0	0	0
Tony Brooks	1956–1961	39 (38 starts)	6	10	75	3	3	0
Paul Emery	1956, 1958	2 (1 start)	0	0	0	0	0	0
Mike MacDowel	1957	1	0	0	0	0	0	0
Dick Gibson	1957–1958	2	0	0	0	0	0	0
Stuart Lewis-Evans	1957–1958	14	0	2	16	2	0	0
Tony Marsh	1957–1958, 1961	5 (4 starts)	0	0	0	0	0	0
Ivor Bueb	1957–1959	6 (5 starts)	0	0	0	0	0	0
Brian Naylor	1957–1961	8 (7 starts)	0	0	0	0	0	0
Tom Bridger	1958	1	0	0	0	0	0	0
Bernie Ecclestone	1958	2 (0 starts)	0	0	0	0	0	0
Alan Stacey	1958–1960	7	0	0	0	0	0	0
Cliff Allison	1958–1961	20 (16 starts)	0	1	11	0	0	0
Ian Burgess	1958–1963	20 (16 starts)	0	0	0	0	0	0
Graham Hill	1958–1975	179 (176 starts)	14	36	270 (289)	13	10	2 (1962, 1968)
Peter Ashdown	1959	1	0	0	0	0	0	0
Colin Davis	1959	2	0	0	0	0	0	0
Bill Moss	1959	1 (0 starts)	0	0	0	0	0	0
Dennis Taylor	1959	1 (0 starts)	0	0	0	0	0	0
Chris Bristow	1959–1960	4	0	0	0	0	0	0
David Piper	1959–1960	3 (2 starts)	0	0	0	0	0	0
Mike Taylor	1959–1960	2 (1 start)	0	0	0	0	0	0
Henry Taylor	1959–1961	11 (8 starts)	0	0	3	0	0	0
Keith Greene	1959–1962	6 (3 starts)	0	0	0	0	0	0
Innes Ireland	1959–1966	53 (50 starts)	1	4	47	0	1	0
Trevor Taylor	1959, 1961–1964, 1966	29 (27 starts)	0	1	8	0	0	0
Tim Parnell	1959, 1961, 1963	4 (2 starts)	0	0	0	0	0	0
Mike Parkes	1959, 1966–1967	7 (6 starts)	0	2	14	1	0	0
Arthur Owen	1960	1	0	0	0	0	0	0
Jim Clark	1960–1968	73 (72 starts)	25	32	255 (274)	33	28	2 (1963, 1965)
John Surtees	1960–1972	113 (111 starts)	6	24	180	8	10	1 (1964)
Vic Wilson	1960, 1966	2 (1 start)	0	0	0	0	0	0
Gerry Ashmore	1961–1962	4 (3 starts)	0	0	0	0	0	0
Jackie Lewis	1961–1962	10 (9 starts)	0	0	3	0	0	0
John Campbell-Jones	1962–1963	2	0	0	0	0	0	0
Peter Arundell	1963–1964, 1966	13 (11 starts)	0	2	12	0	0	0
Ian Raby	1963–1965	7 (3 starts)	0	0	0	0	0	0
Mike Hailwood	1963–1965, 1971–1974	50	0	2	29	0	1	0
Bob Anderson	1963–1967	29 (25 starts)	0	1	8	0	0	0
Mike Spence	1963–1968	37 (36 starts)	0	1	27	0	0	0
David Prophet	1963, 1965	2	0	0	0	0	0	0
Richard Attwood	1964–1965, 1967–1969	17	0	1	11	0	1	0
John Taylor	1964, 1966	5	0	0	1	0	0	0
Brian Gubby	1965	1 (0 starts)	0	0	0	0	0	0
John Rhodes	1965	1	0	0	0	0	0	0
Alan Rollinson	1965	1 (0 starts)	0	0	0	0	0	0
Jackie Stewart	1965–1973	100 (99 starts)	27	43	359 (360)	17	15	3 (1969, 1971, 1973)
Chris Lawrence	1966	2	0	0	0	0	0	0
Chris Irwin	1966–1967	10	0	0	2	0	0	0
Brian Hart	1967	1	0	0	0	0	0	0
Alan Rees	1967	3	0	0	0	0	0	0
Jonathan Williams	1967	1	0	0	0	0	0	0
David Hobbs	1967–1968, 1971, 1974	7	0	0	0	0	0	0
Piers Courage	1967–1970	29 (28 starts)	0	2	20	0	0	0
Robin Widdows	1968	1	0	0	0	0	0	0
Vic Elford	1968–1969, 1971	13	0	0	8	0	0	0
Derek Bell	1968–1972, 1974	16 (9 starts)	0	0	1	0	0	0
Jackie Oliver	1968–1973, 1977	52 (50 starts)	0	2	13	0	1	0
Brian Redman	1968, 1970–1974	15 (12 starts)	0	1	8	0	0	0
John Miles	1969–1970	15 (12 starts)	0	0	2	0	0	0
Peter Westbury	1970	2 (1 start)	0	0	0	0	0	0
Peter Gethin	1970–1974	31 (30 starts)	1	1	11	0	0	0
Chris Craft	1971	2 (1 start)	0	0	0	0	0	0
Mike Beuttler	1971–1973	29 (28 starts)	0	0	0	0	0	0
Roger Williamson	1973	2	0	0	0	0	0	0
David Purley	1973–1974, 1977	11 (7 starts)	0	0	0	0	0	0
James Hunt	1973–1979	93 (92 starts)	10	23	179	14	8	1 (1976)
John Watson	1973–1983, 1985	154 (152 starts)	5	20	169	2	5	0
Richard Robarts	1974	4 (3 starts)	0	0	0	0	0	0
Mike Wilds	1974–1976	8 (3 starts)	0	0	0	0	0	0
Ian Ashley	1974–1977	11 (4 starts)	0	0	0	0	0	0
Tom Pryce	1974–1977	42	0	2	19	1	0	0
Guy Edwards	1974, 1976–1977	17 (11 starts)	0	0	0	0	0	0
Tony Brise	1975	10	0	0	1	0	0	0
Jim Crawford	1975	2	0	0	0	0	0	0
Dave Morgan	1975–1976	1	0	0	0	0	0	0
Bob Evans	1975–1976	12 (10 starts)	0	0	0	0	0	0
Damien Magee	1975–1976	2 (1 start)	0	0	0	0	0	0
Tony Trimmer	1975–1978	6 (0 starts)	0	0	0	0	0	0
Brian Henton	1975, 1977, 1981–1982	37 (19 starts)	0	0	0	0	1	0
Divina Galica	1976, 1978	3 (0 starts)	0	0	0	0	0	0
Andy Sutcliffe	1977	1 (0 starts)	0	0	0	0	0	0
Rupert Keegan	1977–1978, 1980, 1982	37 (25 starts)	0	0	0	0	0	0
Geoff Lees	1978–1980, 1982	12 (5 starts)	0	0	0	0	0	0
Tiff Needell	1980	2 (1 start)	0	0	0	0	0	0
Stephen South	1980	1 (0 starts)	0	0	0	0	0	0
Nigel Mansell	1980–1992, 1994–1995	191 (187 starts)	31	59	480 (482)	32	30	1 (1992)
Derek Warwick	1981–1990, 1993	162 (147 starts)	0	4	71	0	2	0
Jonathan Palmer	1983–1989	88 (83 starts)	0	0	14	0	1	0
Kenny Acheson	1983, 1985	10 (3 starts)	0	0	0	0	0	0
Martin Brundle	1984–1989, 1991–1996	165 (158 starts)	0	9	98	0	0	0
Johnny Dumfries	1986	16 (15 starts)	0	0	3	0	0	0
Julian Bailey	1988, 1991	20 (7 starts)	0	0	1	0	0	0
Martin Donnelly	1989–1990	15 (13 starts)	0	0	0	0	0	0
Johnny Herbert	1989–2000	165 (160 starts)	3	7	98	0	0	0
Mark Blundell	1991, 1993–1995	63 (61 starts)	0	3	32	0	0	0
Perry McCarthy	1992	10 (0 starts)	0	0	0	0	0	0
Damon Hill	1992–1999	122 (115 starts)	22	42	360	20	19	1 (1996)
Eddie Irvine	1993–2002	148 (145 starts)	4	26	191	0	1	0
David Coulthard	1994–2008	247 (246 starts)	13	62	535	12	18	0
Jenson Button	2000–2017	309 (306 starts)	15	50	1235	8	8	1 (2009)
Allan McNish	2002	17 (16 starts)	0	0	0	0	0	0
Anthony Davidson	2002, 2005, 2007–2008	24	0	0	0	0	0	0
Justin Wilson	2003	16	0	0	1	0	0	0
Lewis Hamilton	2007–2026	400 (400 starts)	106	209	5279.5	105	70	7 (2008, 2014, 2015, 2017, 2018, 2019, 2020)
Paul di Resta	2011–2013, 2017	59	0	0	121	0	0	0
Max Chilton	2013–2014	35	0	0	0	0	0	0
Will Stevens	2014–2015	20 (18 starts)	0	0	0	0	0	0
Jolyon Palmer	2016–2017	37 (35 starts)	0	0	9	0	0	0
Lando Norris	2019–2026	172 (171 starts)	14	50	1676	20	20	1 (2025)
George Russell	2019–2026	172 (172 starts)	8	32	1295	12	13	0
Jack Aitken	2020	1	0	0	0	0	0	0
Oliver Bearman	2024–2026	47 (47 starts)	0	0	71	0	0	0
Arvid Lindblad	2026	20 (19 starts)	0	0	38	0	0	0

== See also ==
- List of Formula One Grand Prix winners
