= Mike Parkes =

British racing driver (1931–1977)

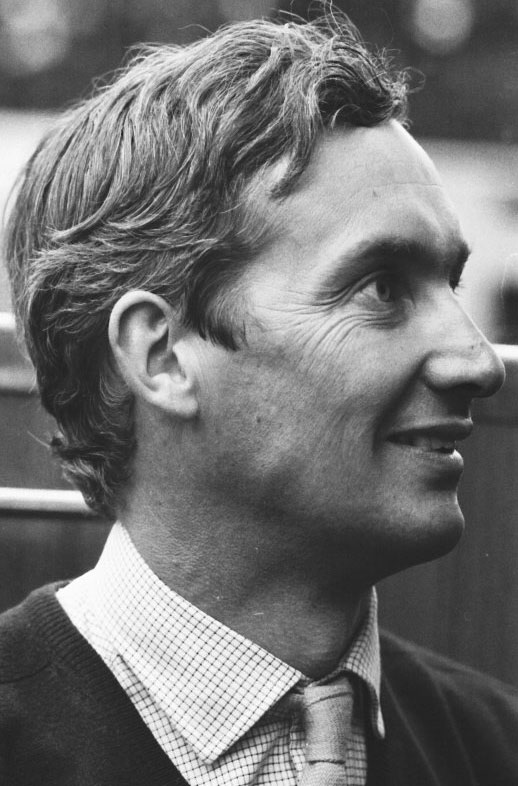
- Parkes in 1969
- Born: Michael Johnson Parkes; 24 September 1931; Richmond, Surrey, England
- Died: 28 August 1977 (aged 45); Riva presso Chieri, Turin, Italy
- Cause of death: Multiple vehicle road collision

Formula One World Championship career
- Nationality: (United Kingdom) British
- Active years: 1959, 1966–1967
- Team(s): Fry, Ferrari
- Entries: 7 (6 starts)
- Championships: 0
- Wins: 0
- Podiums: 2
- Career points: 14
- Pole positions: 1
- Fastest laps: 0
- First entry: 1959 British Grand Prix
- Last entry: 1967 Belgian Grand Prix

Michael Johnson Parkes (24 September 1931 – 28 August 1977) was a British racing driver and engineer, who competed in Formula One at six Grands Prix from 1966 to 1967. (Note: Parkes was also entered into the 1959 British Grand Prix in Formula Two machinery constructed by Fry, but did not qualify.) In endurance racing, Parkes won the 12 Hours of Sebring in 1964 with Ferrari.

Born in Richmond, Surrey, Parkes was the son of John Parkes, chairman and managing director of the Alvis Group. Parkes participated in seven Formula One Grands Prix, debuting at the 1959 British Grand Prix in a Formula Two car entered by Fry. Amidst a successful sportscar racing career, he returned to Formula One with Ferrari in 1966, achieving one pole position, two podiums, and a total of 14 championship points.

Outside of motor racing, Parkes worked as an automotive engineer; whilst working for the Rootes Group, he was involved in the development of the Hillman Imp. From 1974 onwards, he served as principal development engineer of the Lancia Stratos. In August 1977, Parkes died in a road traffic collision near Turin, aged 45.

== Early life ==
Michael Johnson Parkes was born on 24 September 1931 in Richmond, Surrey, England. Parkes was the eldest son of John Parkes, who was chairman and managing director of the Alvis Group; he was also an aviator. Parkes studied at Haileybury College in Hertford Heath, Hertfordshire.

== Sports car racing career ==
Parkes began his racing career in the mid-1950s initially with an MG before moving on to a Frazer Nash. In 1957, he raced a Lotus and came to the attention of Colin Chapman who invited him to act as reserve driver for the works team at Le Mans. He then became involved with the Fry Formula Two project in 1958 and 1959, before returning to sportscars in 1960.

In 1960, Parkes drove a Lotus Elite for Sir Gawaine Baillie before moving to Tommy Sopwith's Equipe Endeavour in 1961, where he drove in sportscars and Formula Junior. He also drove a Ferrari GT for UK Ferrari franchise, Maranello Concessionaires. At Le Mans, he shared a three-litre Ferrari Testa Rossa with Willy Mairesse and finished second.

In May 1962, Mairesse and Parkes came second in the 1000km Nürburgring race in a Ferrari behind the winning car of the same marque driven by Phil Hill and Olivier Gendebien. Parkes finished a mere car length behind Graham Hill in the 28th Royal Automobile Club tourist trophy race in August 1963. Umberto Maglioli and Parkes drove one of the Ferraris which claimed the top five qualifying positions for the 1964 12 Hours of Sebring. The Ferraris were equipped with new power plants. Parkes was timed at 3:10.4. In the race Parkes established a speed record and completed the most miles ever for a winner.

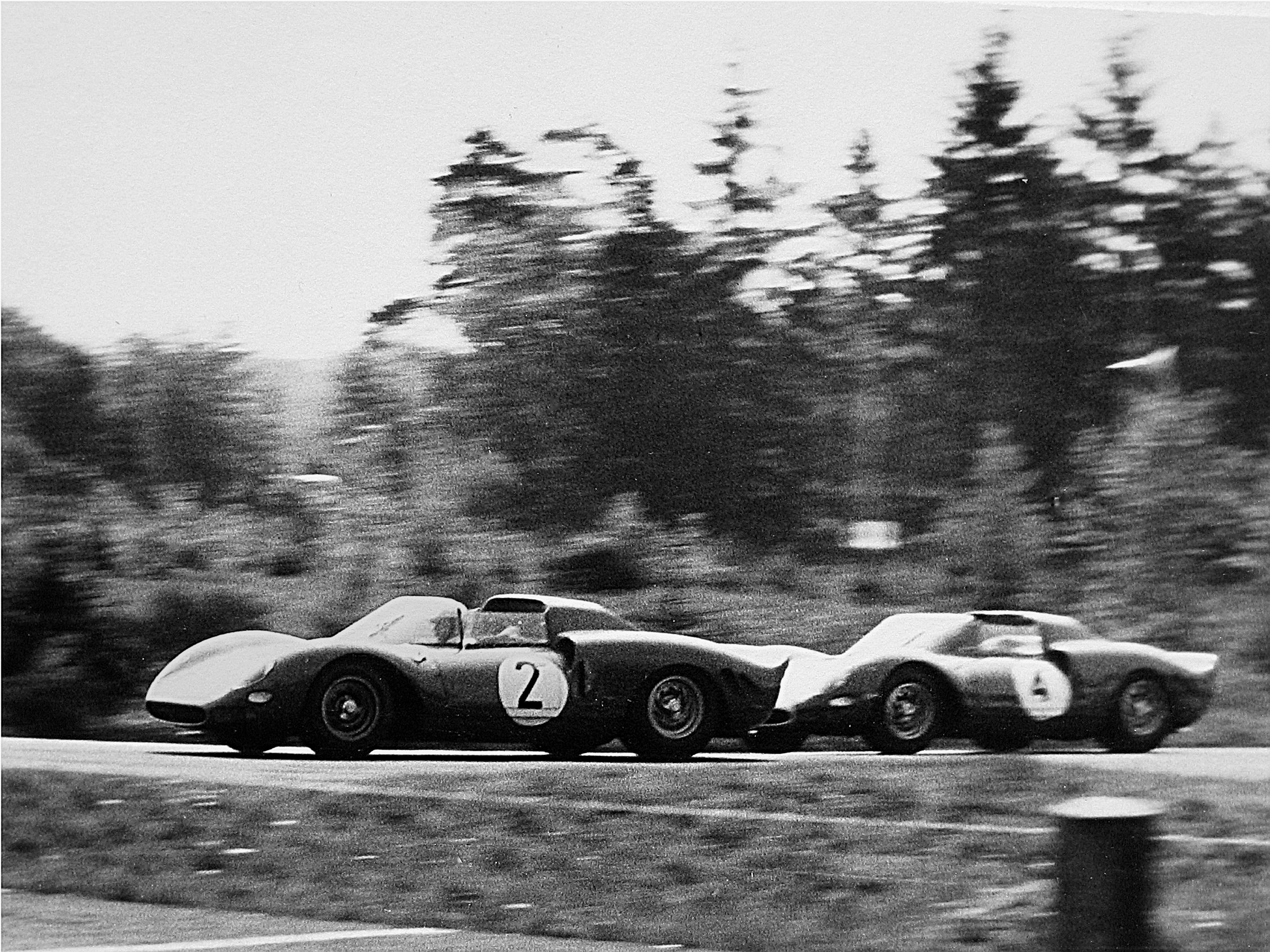
Parkes at the 1965 1000km Nürburgring in front of Graham Hill, both in Ferraris.

Parkes and Maglioli, finished a considerable distance ahead of the Ferrari of Ludovico Scarfiotti and Nino Vaccarella. Parkes teamed with Jean Guichet in a Ferrari to capture the 1,000 kilometre Classic of Monza Italy in April 1965. Tommy Spichiger, 30, of Switzerland, died instantly on the 34th lap of the race when his Ferrari 365 prototype went off the track and burst into flames. Parkes and Guichet led most of the race in their Ferrari prototype, after taking the lead from John Surtees and Ludovico Scarfiotti.

Parkes and Guichet placed second to Surtees and Scarfiotti in a 620-mile race at the Nürburgring in May 1965. The winning pair led the full 44 laps. It was a fourth consecutive victory for Ferrari. Dan Gurney eclipsed the time of Parkes in the sole factory Ferrari in the final practice for the 1966 12 Hours of Sebring. The blue Ford was clocked at 2:54.6, two seconds faster than a lap run by Parkes the previous day. In a Ferrari P3 prototype, Parkes lap was so fast that none of the time-speed conversion charts would accept it. Parkes and Bob Bondurant started second after Gurney and his co-driver, Jerry Grant.

Surtees and Parkes were in a Ferrari prototype in their victory in a 620-mile Monza sports car event in April 1966. Chris Amon and Lorenzo Bandini were triumphant in a 100 lap, 1,000 kilometre Monza race in April 1967. They drove a four-litre Ferrari for an average speed of 122.30 m.p.h. Parkes and Scarfiotti finished second with a time of 5:10:59.2. The winning time was 5 hours seven minutes, 43 seconds. The Ferraris were in front after the Chaparrals of Phil Hill and Mike Spence had to make pit stops following the 17th and 18th laps. He finished second at the 1967 24 Hours of Le Mans, paired with Ludovico Scarfiotti, in a Ferrari 330P4.

After the crash at the Spa Belgian GP 1967, Parkes returned to race sport cars events in 1970, with remarkable fourth place at the Daytona 24 hours on a Ferrari 312P entered by NART (paired with Sam Posey), at Sebring 12 hours he finished sixth on the same car (together with Chuck Parsons). He continued the season racing on the Filipinetti Ferrari 512S, reaching fifth place at the Targa Florio and 4th at the Nurburgring 1000 km together with Herbert Muller.

Parkes competed in a 1,000 kilometre sports car race in Argentina in January 1971, he was just ahead of Ignazio Giunti's Ferrari 312PB when the Italian driver crashed on the Beltoise's Matra. He was paired with Joakim Bonnier in a five-litre Ferrari entered and owned by the Swiss Filippinetti stable which maintained operations in Modena. Parkes competed in the 1971 24 Hours of Le Mans in a modified Ferrari 512M paired with Henri Pescarolo. He was involved in the development of this car (named 512F, where "F" stands for Filipinetti, the car's owner), which proved to be very fast, winning a non-championship race at Vallelunga, Rome ahead of the Jo Siffert Porsche 917K. Parkes-Pescarolo were running well at Le Mans when a mechanical failure during the night ended their race. Parkes came back to Le Mans in 1972 with a Ferrari 365GTB entered by Filipinetti. His teammates were Lafosse and Cochet, the trio finished in seventh place, third in the GT class behind two other Ferraris.

== Formula One career ==
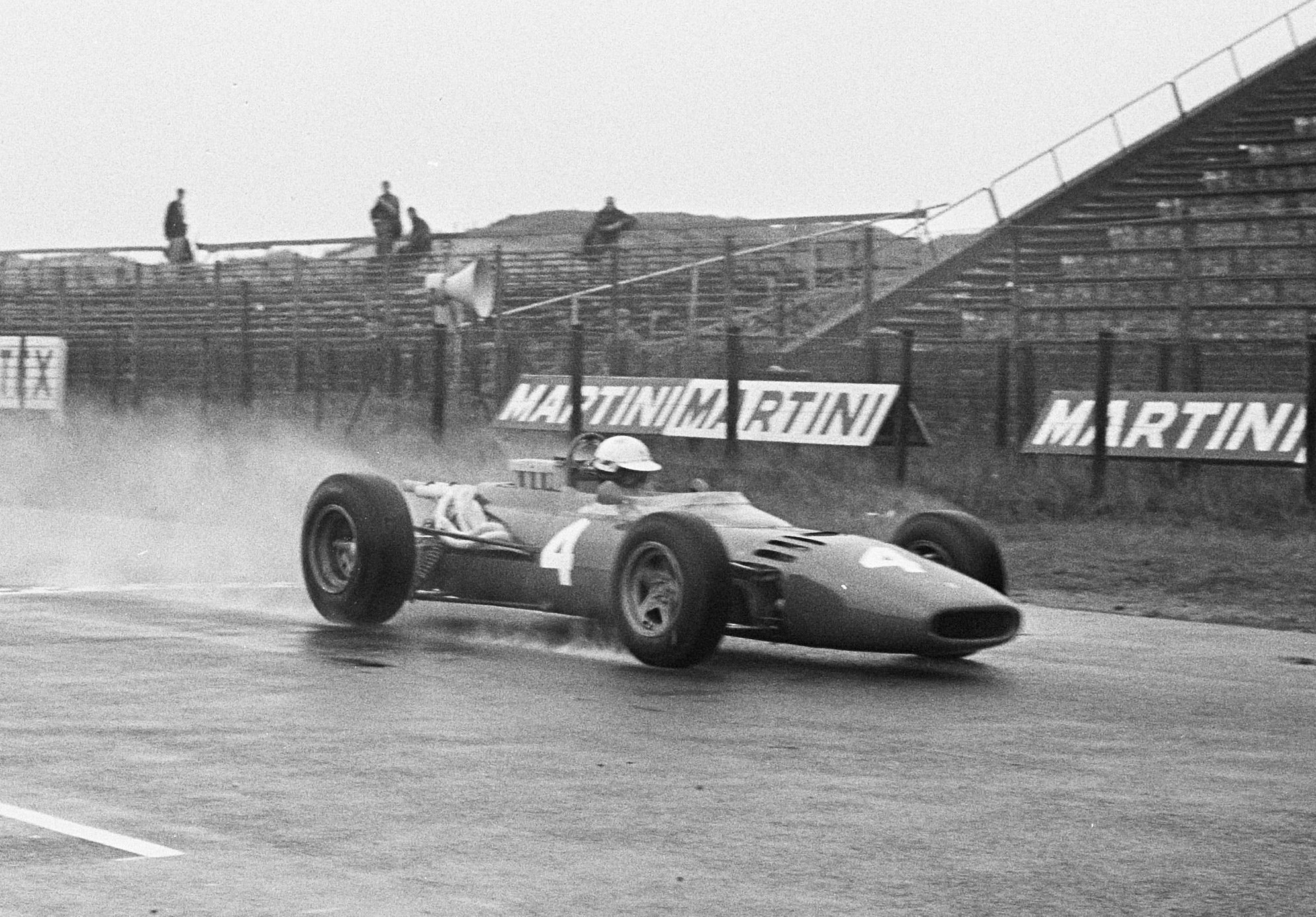
Parkes driving for Ferrari at the 1966 Dutch Grand Prix.

Parkes first entered a World Championship Grand Prix at Aintree in 1959 driving a Formula 2 (F2) Fry-Climax 1.5-litre Straight-4. However he did not qualify and returned to sportscars thereafter, apart from a single outing at Mallory Park in 1962 with a Bowmaker Cooper. Following his success with Ferrari sportscars, Parkes joined Ferrari officially, in 1963 as development and reserve driver, and over the following seasons became recognised as a leading sports car driver.

When John Surtees unexpectedly left Ferrari in 1966, Parkes was promoted to the Grand Prix team and with an extended chassis to accommodate his height of six feet four inches, was immediately successful, finishing in second place in the 1966 French Grand Prix at Reims. Jack Brabham won the race with his teammate, Denny Hulme, third, in their Brabham–Repcos. However this was followed by two retirements before another second place at Monza where he also took pole position.

In April 1967, Parkes won the 1967 BRDC International Trophy non-championship Formula One race at Silverstone by one third of a lap over Brabham. The 52 lap race was the first Formula One contest for Parkes in his native country. He completed the 152.36 mile competition in 1:19:39.25 with an average speed of 114.65 m.p.h. In May 1967, shortly after Lorenzo Bandini had died, Ferrari entered two 1966 model single seaters in the 1967 Syracuse Grand Prix, a Formula One race that did not count towards the Formula One World Championship and attracted only 8 entrants, mostly outdated machinery. Honoring Bandini, Parkes and Scarfiotti both won the race in a dead heat.

Parkes competed in two further Grands Prix for Ferrari finishing fifth at Zandvoort but retiring through accident at Spa, after sliding on oil being sprayed from Jackie Stewart's H16 BRM, on the first lap, suffering broken legs that would ultimately end his Grand Prix career.

After Parkes' Formula One career ended, he raced into the 1970s in sports cars.

== Automotive engineering ==
When not racing cars, Parkes worked as an automotive engineer. Parkes worked for the Rootes Group from 1950 to 1962, initially as an apprentice. One of his roles at Rootes was as project engineer in the development of the Hillman Imp.

In 1963, Parkes joined Ferrari as development engineer for their road cars, notably the 330 GTC, and also as a GT sports car driver. Following his absence from work after his serious F1 accident, he returned to Ferrari in 1969 to find the company partly under the control of Fiat and at that point decided to work for Scuderia Filipinetti as engineer as well as driver. His departure from Ferrari was partly due to Enzo Ferrari's refusal to allow him to return to F1 after his accident, claiming that he was too valuable as an engineer.

In 1974, Parkes took a job as principal development engineer for the Lancia Stratos.

== Death ==
Parkes was killed in a road collision on 28 August 1977 near Riva presso Chieri, Turin, Italy. Parkes was returning home from Modena to Turin - driving his Lancia Beta - when he rear-ended a 43-ton lorry in wet conditions; he was killed instantly.

== Racing record ==
=== Complete Formula One World Championship results ===
(key) (Races in bold indicate pole position)

Year	Entrant	Chassis	Engine	1	2	3	4	5	6	7	8	9	10	11	WDC	Points
1959	David Fry	Fry (F2)	Climax Straight-4	MON	500	NED	FRA	GBR; DNQ	GER	POR	ITA	USA			NC	0
1966	Scuderia Ferrari	Ferrari 312/66	Ferrari V12	MON	BEL	FRA; 2	GBR	NED; Ret	GER; Ret	**ITA**; 2	USA	MEX			8th	12
1967	Scuderia Ferrari	Ferrari 312/66	Ferrari V12	RSA	MON	NED; 5	BEL; Ret	FRA	GBR	GER	CAN	ITA	USA	MEX	16th	2

=== Non-Championship Formula One results ===
(key) (Races in bold indicate pole position) (Races in italics indicate fastest lap)

Year	Entrant	Chassis	Engine	1	2	3	4	5	6	7	8	9	10	11	12	13	14	15	16	17	18	19	20
1959	David Fry	Fry (F2)	Climax Straight-4	GLV	AIN	INT	OUL	SIL; 12															
1962	Cooper Car Company	Cooper T56	Climax V8	CAP	BRX	LOM	LAV	GLV	PAU	AIN	INT	NAP	MAL; 4	CLP	RMS	SOL	KAN	MED	DAN	OUL	MEX	RAN	NAT
1967	Scuderia Ferrari	Ferrari 312	Ferrari V12	ROC	SPC	INT; 1	**SYR**; 1	OUL	ESP														

=== Complete British Saloon Car Championship results ===
(key) (Races in bold indicate pole position; races in italics indicate fastest lap.)

Year	Team	Car	Class	1	2	3	4	5	6	7	8	9	DC	Pts	Class
1960	Sunbeam-Talbot Ltd	Sunbeam Rapier Series III	1001-1600cc	BRH	SNE	MAL	OUL	SNE	BRH	BRH; Ret*	BRH		NC*	0*	
1961	Equipe Endeavour	Jaguar Mk II 3.8	D	SNE; Ret	**GOO**; 1	**AIN**; 4	SIL; 2	CRY; Ret	SIL; 1	BRH; 1	OUL; Ret	SNE; 1	**2nd**	**44**	**1st**
1962	Equipe Endeavour	Jaguar Mk II 3.8	D	SNE; 1	**GOO**; Ret	AIN; 5	**SIL**; 2	CRY	AIN; 2	BRH; 1	OUL; 3		5th	32	**3rd**

- Car over 1000cc – Not eligible for points.

== Notes ==
Sporting positions
Preceded by Jack Brabham	BRDC International Trophy; Winner; 1967	Succeeded by Denny Hulme
