= Fry (racing team) =

British racing car constructor

Fry was a Formula Two constructor from the United Kingdom. The team was founded by David Fry and Alec Issigonis, whose previous employer John Parkes at Alvis brought his son Mike Parkes as a development driver. The car, built to Formula 2 specifications, was fitted with a Coventry Climax engine and was constructed with several advanced concepts, featuring a semi-monocoque design, an extreme forward driving position and a shark fin on its rear.

The Fry F2 made its début appearance in June 1958 at Brands Hatch, with Parkes finishing its first race sixth at the Crystal Palace circuit. Appearing in a number of Formula Two events throughout 1958 and 1959, the car was entered for the Formula One 1959 British Grand Prix. Parkes did not qualify for the race, setting the 27th fastest time, and the car was not entered for another World Championship Grand Prix. The car participated in several more races, before the final appearance with a second-place finish at the Brands Hatch Boxing Day event.

== Complete Formula One World Championship results ==
(key)

Year	Chassis	Engine	Tyres	Driver	1	2	3	4	5	6	7	8	9	Points	WCC
1959	Fry F2	Climax Straight-4	D		MON	500	NED	FRA	GBR	GER	POR	ITA	USA	0	NC
1959	Fry F2	Climax Straight-4	D	Mike Parkes					DNQ					0	NC
