= 1959 British Grand Prix =

← Previous race	Next race →

Race details
- Date: 18 July 1959
- Official name: 12th RAC British Grand Prix
- Location: Aintree Circuit, Liverpool, England
- Course: Permanent road course
- Course length: 4.828 km (3.000 miles)
- Distance: 75 laps, 362.10 km (225.00 miles)
- Weather: Dry and sunny.

Pole position
Driver	(Australia) Jack Brabham	Cooper-Climax
- Time: 1:58.0

Fastest lap
Drivers	(United Kingdom) Stirling Moss (lap 69)	BRM
	(New Zealand) Bruce McLaren (lap 75)	Cooper-Climax
- Time: 1:57.0

Podium
First	(Australia) Jack Brabham	Cooper-Climax
Second	(United Kingdom) Stirling Moss	BRM
Third	(New Zealand) Bruce McLaren	Cooper-Climax

The 1959 British Grand Prix was a Formula One motor race held at the Aintree Circuit on 18 July 1959. It was race 5 of 9 in the 1959 World Championship of Drivers and race 4 of 8 in the 1959 International Cup for Formula One Manufacturers. It was the 14th British Grand Prix and the third to be held at the Aintree Motor Racing Circuit, a circuit mapped out in the grounds of the Aintree Racecourse horse racing venue. The race was held over 75 laps of the four kilometre circuit for a race distance of 362 kilometres.

The race was won by Australian Jack Brabham taking his second Grand Prix victory in a works Cooper T51 with rear-mid engine, from Climax. Brabham dominated the race (and the season), leading all 75 laps to win by 22 seconds over British driver Stirling Moss driving a British Racing Partnership entered front engine BRM P25. It was the first time a BRP entry finished in the top three. Brabham's Cooper Car Company teammate, New Zealander Bruce McLaren finished in third place, just 0.2 seconds behind Moss, having lost second place late in the race. Harry Schell finished fourth for the Owen Racing Organisation BRM team a lap behind Brabham.

The British Grand Prix had the biggest entry of the 1959 season, outside the 1959 Indianapolis 500, with 30 cars competing and 24 starting the race, all despite the absence of Ferrari. Strikes in Italy trapped the team at home, leaving the local British teams to fight over the race, with nearly all drivers being Anglo-Saxons. Ferrari's new driver Tony Brooks was given a release and started the race in a Vanwall, the dominating team of 1958. Vanwall wasn't nearly as good in 1959, Brooks was the first to retire with misfire after 13 laps, having started in a lowly 17th after winning the French Grand Prix a few weeks earlier, then in a front engine 2500cc Ferrari.

Several teams entered 1500cc Formula 2 cars, most with the smaller of the Coventry Climax FPF versions, but some with a Borgward 1500 RS engine. Like Climax, Maserati 4-cylinder engines came in both sizes. The event had four drivers with the same surname - Taylor - enter.

The win saw Brabham expand his points lead over Brooks to 13 points. Moss and McLaren moved into fourth place just half a point behind the absent Phil Hill.

On the last lap of this race, McLaren became the youngest driver to set a fastest lap in Formula One, aged 21 years and 322 days. It was another 44 years before Fernando Alonso relieved him of that achievement with fastest lap in the 2003 Canadian Grand Prix. He was a day younger aged 21 years and 321 days.

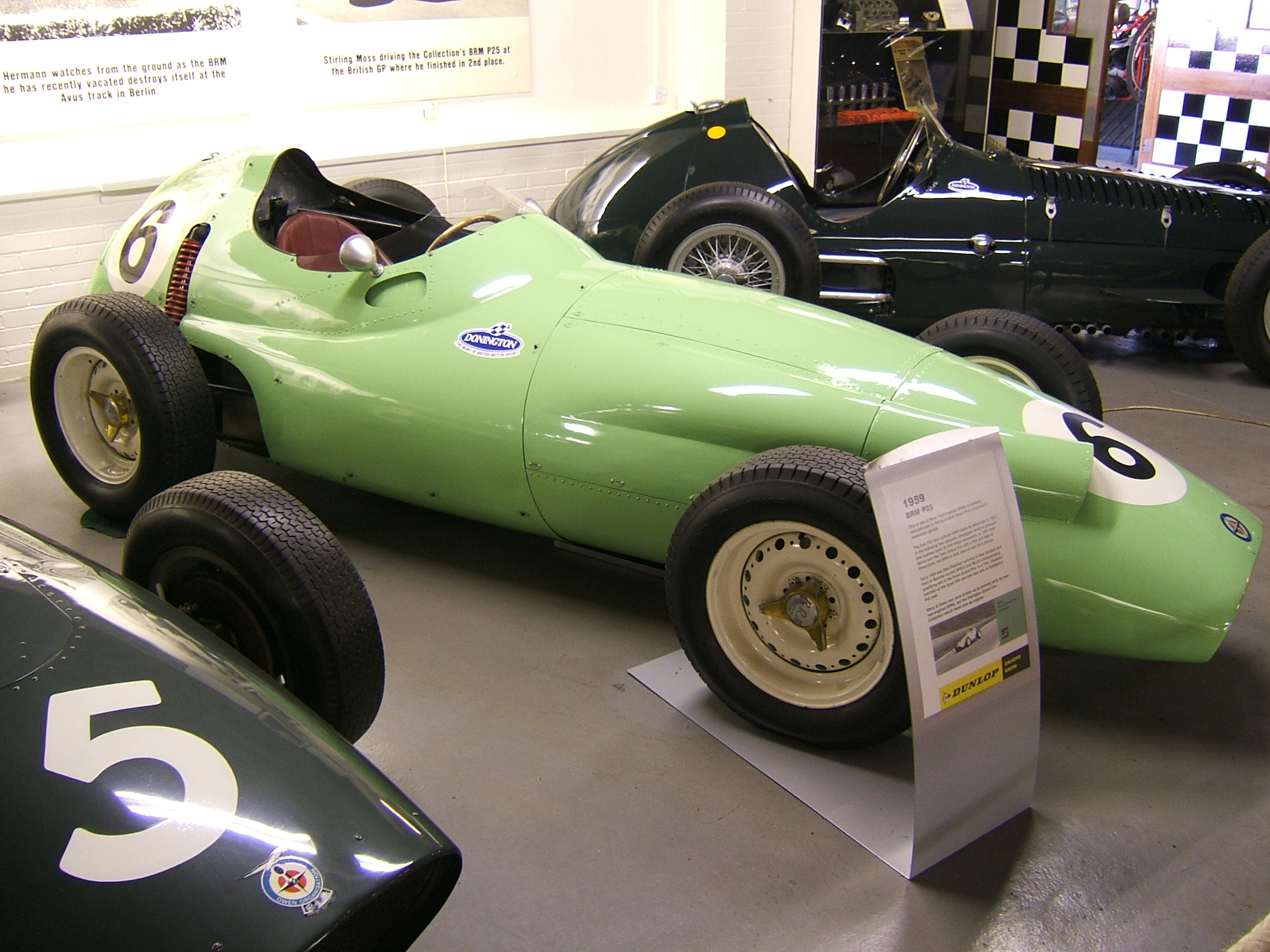
The BRP-entered BRM P25 which Stirling Moss drove to second place in the 1959 British Grand Prix, BRP's first podium finish.

== Classification ==
=== Qualifying ===
Pos	No	Driver	Constructor	Time	Gap
1	12	(Australia) Jack Brabham	Cooper-Climax	1:58.0	—
2	2	(United Kingdom) Roy Salvadori	Aston Martin	1:58.0	+0.0
3	8	(United States) Harry Schell	BRM	1:59.2	+1.2
4	18	(France) Maurice Trintignant	Cooper-Climax	1:59.2	+1.2
5	14	(United States) Masten Gregory	Cooper-Climax	1:59.4	+1.4
6	4	(United States) Carroll Shelby	Aston Martin	1:59.6	+1.6
7	6	(United Kingdom) Stirling Moss	BRM	1:59.6	+1.6
8	16	(New Zealand) Bruce McLaren	Cooper-Climax	1:59.6	+1.6
9	28	(United Kingdom) Graham Hill	Lotus-Climax	2:00.0	+2.0
10	10	(Sweden) Jo Bonnier	BRM	2:00.0	+2.0
11	42	(United Kingdom) Ron Flockhart	BRM	2:00.2	+2.2
12	30	(United Kingdom) Alan Stacey	Lotus-Climax	2:02.8	+4.8
13	22	(United Kingdom) Ian Burgess	Cooper-Maserati	2:03.0	+5.0
14	36	(United Kingdom) Brian Naylor	JBW-Maserati	2:03.0	+5.0
15	38	(United Kingdom) Jack Fairman	Cooper-Climax	2:04.2	+6.2
16	48	(United Kingdom) Chris Bristow	Cooper-Borgward	2:04.4	+6.4
17	20	(United Kingdom) Tony Brooks	Vanwall	2:04.6	+6.6
18	46	(United Kingdom) Ivor Bueb	Cooper-Borgward	2:04.8	+6.8
19	24	(Germany) Hans Herrmann	Cooper-Maserati	2:05.6	+7.6
20	40	(Brazil) Fritz d'Orey	Maserati	2:05.6	+7.6
21	58	(United Kingdom) Henry Taylor	Cooper-Climax	2:05.6	+7.6
22	64	(United Kingdom) David Piper	Lotus-Climax	2:06.0	+8.0
23	52	(United Kingdom) Peter Ashdown	Cooper-Climax	2:06.2	+8.2
24	50	(United Kingdom) Mike Taylor	Cooper-Climax	2:07.0	+9.0
DNQ	56	(United Kingdom) Bill Moss	Cooper-Climax	2:07.2	+9.2
DNQ	60	(United Kingdom) Mike Parkes	Fry-Climax	2:07.6	+9.6
DNQ	44	(United Kingdom) Trevor Taylor	Cooper-Climax	2:08.2	+10.2
DNQ	54	(United Kingdom) Keith Greene	Cooper-Climax	2:09.8	+11.6
DNQ	62	(United Kingdom) Dennis Taylor	Lotus-Climax		
DNQ	66	(United Kingdom) Tim Parnell	Cooper-Climax		

=== Race ===
Pos	No	Driver	Constructor	Laps	Time/Retired	Grid	Points
1	12	(Australia) Jack Brabham	Cooper-Climax	75	2:30:11.6	1	8
2	6	(United Kingdom) Stirling Moss	BRM	75	+ 22.2	7	6.5^{1}
3	16	(New Zealand) Bruce McLaren	Cooper-Climax	75	+ 22.4	8	4.5^{1}
4	8	(United States) Harry Schell	BRM	74	+ 1 Lap	3	3
5	18	(France) Maurice Trintignant	Cooper-Climax	74	+ 1 Lap	4	2
6	2	(United Kingdom) Roy Salvadori	Aston Martin	74	+ 1 Lap	2	
7	14	(United States) Masten Gregory	Cooper-Climax	73	+ 2 Laps	5	
8	30	(United Kingdom) Alan Stacey	Lotus-Climax	71	+ 4 Laps	12	
9	28	(United Kingdom) Graham Hill	Lotus-Climax	70	+ 5 Laps	9	
10	48	(United Kingdom) Chris Bristow	Cooper-Borgward	70	+ 5 Laps	16	
11	58	(United Kingdom) Henry Taylor	Cooper-Climax	69	+ 6 Laps	21	
12	52	(United Kingdom) Peter Ashdown	Cooper-Climax	69	+ 6 Laps	23	
13	46	(United Kingdom) Ivor Bueb	Cooper-Borgward	69	+ 6 Laps	18	
Ret	4	(United States) Carroll Shelby	Aston Martin	69	Ignition	6	
Ret	40	(Brazil) Fritz d'Orey	Maserati	57	Accident	20	
Ret	42	(United Kingdom) Ron Flockhart	BRM	53	Spun Off	11	
Ret	38	(United Kingdom) Jack Fairman	Cooper-Climax	39	Gearbox	15	
Ret	10	(Sweden) Jo Bonnier	BRM	37	Brakes	10	
Ret	22	(United Kingdom) Ian Burgess	Cooper-Maserati	31	Transmission	13	
Ret	24	(Germany) Hans Herrmann	Cooper-Maserati	21	Gearbox	19	
Ret	64	(United Kingdom) David Piper	Lotus-Climax	19	Overheating	22	
Ret	36	(United Kingdom) Brian Naylor	JBW-Maserati	18	Transmission	14	
Ret	50	(United Kingdom) Mike Taylor	Cooper-Climax	17	Transmission	24	
Ret	20	(United Kingdom) Tony Brooks	Vanwall	13	Ignition	17	
DNQ	54	(United Kingdom) Keith Greene	Cooper-Climax				
DNQ	56	(United Kingdom) Bill Moss	Cooper-Climax				
DNQ	60	(United Kingdom) Mike Parkes	Fry-Climax				
DNQ	62	(United Kingdom) Dennis Taylor	Lotus-Climax				
DNQ	44	(United Kingdom) Trevor Taylor	Cooper-Climax				
DNQ	66	(United Kingdom) Tim Parnell	Cooper-Climax				

Notes

- ^1 – Includes 0.5 points for shared fastest lap

== Notes ==
- This race marked the first Formula One World Championship Grand Prix pole position for Jack Brabham and for an Australian driver.
- This was Bruce McLaren's first fastest lap and podium finish. It also marked the first Formula One World Championship fastest lap and podium finish for a New Zealand driver.

== Championship standings after the race ==
Drivers' Championship standings

	Pos	Driver	Points
	1	(Australia) Jack Brabham	27
	2	(United Kingdom) Tony Brooks	14
	3	(United States) Phil Hill	9
12	4	(United Kingdom) Stirling Moss	8.5
5	5	(New Zealand) Bruce McLaren	8.5

Constructors' Championship standings

Pos	Constructor	Points
1	(United Kingdom) Cooper-Climax	26
2	(Italy) Ferrari	16
3	(United Kingdom) BRM	14
4	(United Kingdom) Lotus-Climax	3

- Notes: Only the top five positions are included for both sets of standings.

Previous race: 1959 French Grand Prix	FIA Formula One World Championship; 1959 season	Next race: 1959 German Grand Prix
Previous race: 1958 British Grand Prix	British Grand Prix	Next race: 1960 British Grand Prix
