= Bill Moss (racing driver) =

British racing driver (1933–2010)

- Born: 4 September 1933; Luton, Bedfordshire
- Died: 13 January 2010 (aged 76); Woodsford, Dorset

Formula One World Championship career
- Nationality: (United Kingdom) British
- Active years: 1959
- Team: non-works Cooper
- Entries: 1 (0 starts)
- Championships: 0
- Wins: 0
- Podiums: 0
- Career points: 0
- Pole positions: 0
- Fastest laps: 0
- First entry: 1959 British Grand Prix

William Frank Moss (4 September 1933 – 13 January 2010) was a British racing driver from England.

Moss entered one World Championship Formula One race, the 1959 British Grand Prix, with his United Racing Stable Cooper T51, a Formula 2 car, and failed to qualify. Moss was British Formula Junior Champion in 1961.

Moss was not related to Stirling Moss, winner of 16 Grands Prix.

== Complete Formula One World Championship results ==
(key)

Year	Entrant	Chassis	Engine	1	2	3	4	5	6	7	8	9	WDC	Points
1959	United Racing Stable	Cooper T51 (F2)	Climax Straight-4	MON	500	NED	FRA	GBR; DNQ	GER	POR	ITA	USA	NC	0
