= Peter Ashdown =

British racing driver (born 1934)

- Born: 16 October 1934 (age 92); Danbury, Essex, England

Formula One World Championship career
- Nationality: (United Kingdom) British
- Active years: 1959
- Team: non-works Cooper
- Entries: 1
- Championships: 0
- Wins: 0
- Podiums: 0
- Career points: 0
- Pole positions: 0
- Fastest laps: 0
- First entry: 1959 British Grand Prix

Peter Hawthorn Ashdown (born 16 October 1934) is a former motor racing driver. He drove in a single Formula One World Championship Grand Prix, racing a Cooper.

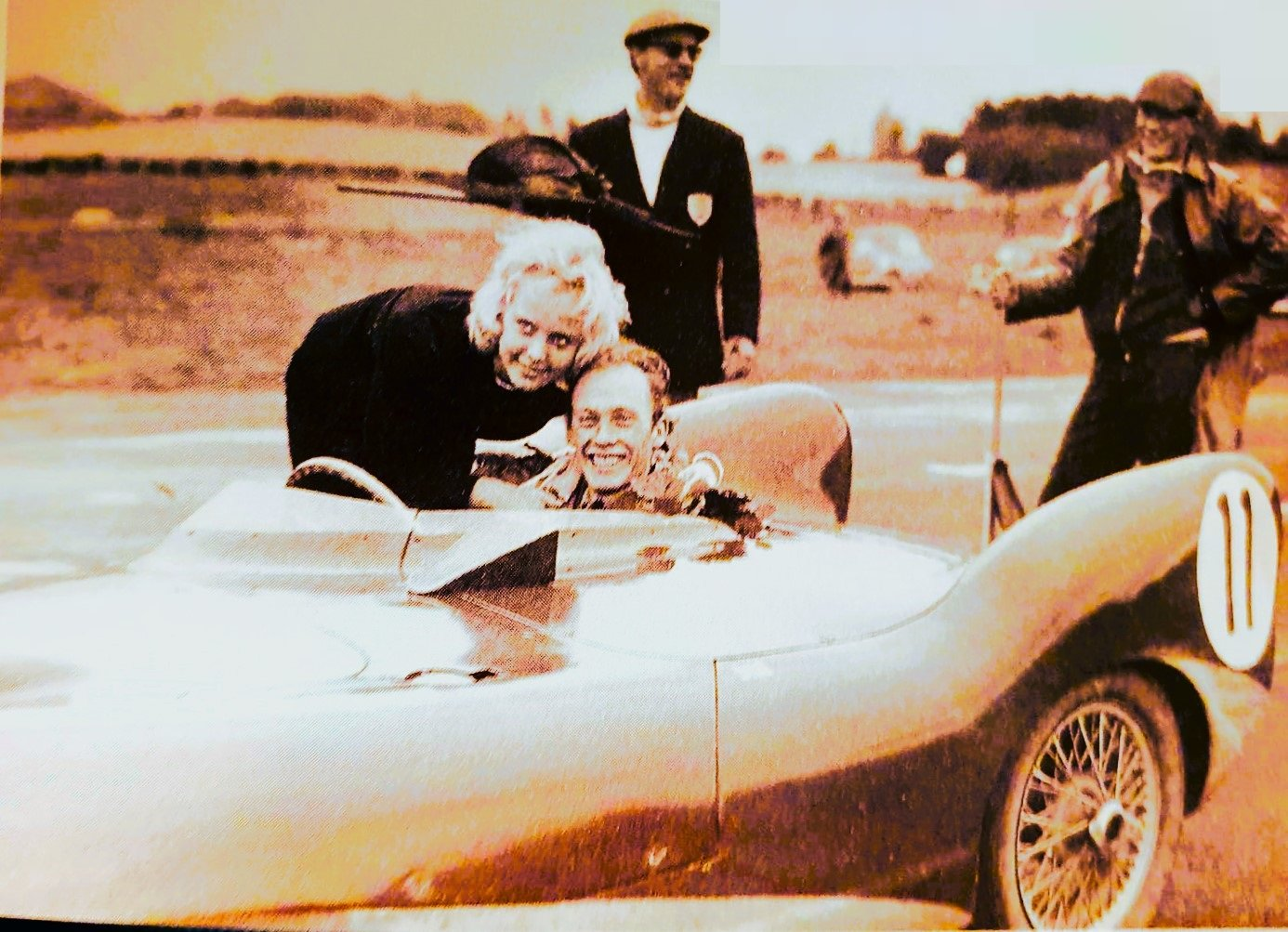
Ashdown is celebrated after winning his class and being 3rd overall, at the Kanonloppet race at Karlskoga racetrack (Gelleråsen) on 26 August 1956 in his Lotus Mark IX license "KH9". On his return he drove this tiny car back to the UK, but had an accident from which this car was not to be repaired.

Ashdown had trained as a vehicle mechanic, and had been a few years in the Royal Air Force when he started racing. First seen in a Dellow with a Ford 10 engine, he continued around 1955 to race in a Lotus Mark IX as a privateer, not being part of any particular racing team.

Prior to Formula One, Ashtown was one of the leaders of the British Formula Junior scene, but an accident at Rouen-Les-Essarts in 1958, in which he broke his collarbone, considerably hampered his career.

Ashtown continued racing, and competed in a Formula Two (F2) Cooper-Climax entered by Alan Brown at the 1959 British Grand Prix at Aintree. He finished in 12th position, third of the F2 cars and six laps down.

From there, Ashtown drove a Formula Junior Lola and many small-engined sports cars, winning his class in the 1960 and 1962 1000km of Nürburgring. On the latter occasion at the Nordschleife, he and the co-driver Bruce Johnstone scored the debut win for Lotus 23 in the 1L Sportscar class with a 997cc Cosworth Mk.III as a semi-works entry (Ian Walker Racing), while the other semi-works (Essex Racing Stable) Lotus 23 of Jim Clark crashed on lap 12 of the 44 lap race.

Ashtown retired in 1962 and focused his efforts on a Vauxhall dealership in Essex.

== Complete Formula One World Championship results ==
(key)

Year	Entrant	Chassis	Engine	1	2	3	4	5	6	7	8	9	WDC	Points
1959	Equipe Alan Brown	Cooper T45 (F2)	Climax Straight-4	MON	500	NED	FRA	GBR; 12	GER	POR	ITA	USA	NC	0
