= Colotti Trasmissioni =

Italian mechanical engineering firm

Colotti Trasmissioni (Colotti Transmission) is an Italian mechanical engineering firm located in Modena, Italy. It specializes in gears, limited-slip differentials and transmission systems for racing cars.

== History 1958-1979 ==
Valerio Colotti, who is famous as the chassis designer/engineer of the Maserati 250F, started his own company called Tec-Mec in 1958. One of the first achievements was the design and manufacture of differential gear set/housing for Rob Walker, which solidified his reputation in the Grand Prix circles.

After building a GP car for Jean Behra, which became known as Behra-Porsche, Colotti built his own Grand Prix car named Tec-Mec F415, based on Maserati 250F in 1959, with Fritz d'Orey as the driver who finished 10th at the 1959 French Grand Prix. At about the same time, Alf Francis, the Chief Engineer at Rob Walker Racing, started working with Colotti, changing the Tec-Mec name to Colotti-Francis.

Colotti-Francis was responsible for a Formula Junior car named T.C.A. (Trips Colotti Automobili) built for Graf von Trips, but this project ended with Trips' death at the 1961 Italian Grand Prix held at Monza, where his Ferrari 156 collided with Jim Clark's Lotus 21, when a third-place finish would have secured Count Trips the first ever Grand Prix World Championship title for a German, which did not materialize until 1994.

Rob Walker asked Colotti to analyse and modify the front suspension of two Lotus racing cars belonging to Rob Walker Racing, and the plausible result prompted Rob Walker to let Colotti review the design of his own Grand Prix car, Walker Special, which was being built at the time. With the new 1.5-liter Formula One regulation going into effect for the 1960 season, Colotti designed and built the T.32 5-speed and T.34 6-speed transaxles. These weighed less than 35 kg and were suitable for lower-torque, high-rev 1.5-liter engines mounted behind the driver.

Outside of the racing field, Colotti worked under the name G.S.D. (Gear Speed Developments), such as on a transmission of a Hovercraft for Britten-Norman of Isle of Wight, and a power take-off/transfer system for the mixer drum on Cement mixer trucks, which replaced the long chain drives previously used.

Francis and Colotti knew the shortage of limited-slip differential manufacturers was a big hardship experienced by Grand Prix constructors then. For example, Colin Chapman had his in-house engineers, Keith Duckworth and Mike Costin, develop the sequentially shifting transaxles for Lotus 16 and Lotus 18, which he had originally asked Richard Ansdale and Harry Mundy to design for Lotus 12. But despite these transaxles being unique and innovative, they still incorporated limited-slip differentials made by ZF of Germany, which was about the only source, and the technology used was an old slip-limiting principle invented by Ferdinand Porsche in the 1930s for Auto Union GP cars.

Colotti, whose company name had become Colotti Trasmissioni (Colotti Transmission) by this time, researched the issue, and developed and patented a unique mechanism called Coppia-Frenata to limit the slip on the differential gears. This limited-slip differential became popular among the Formula 1 and other racing teams, being one of the few viable alternatives to the ZF product.

In 1962, Colin Chapman asked Colotti to design and build a transaxle for a car designed for Indianapolis 500. This high torque specification 4-speed T.37 transaxle was designed for Small Block Ford-based engines. In the Lotus 29, which had a Ford 256 CID all-aluminium pushrod V-8 based on the cast-iron Fairlane 260 CID V-8, a T.37 with two speeds blanked off was used. The car went on to score the second and seventh-place finishes at the 1963 Indy 500 in the hands of Jim Clark and Dan Gurney, respectively.

The T.37 (with no gears blocked off) was later used by Eric Broadley on the Lola Mk6, and by Ford for the Ford GT40 in their joint project with Broadley.

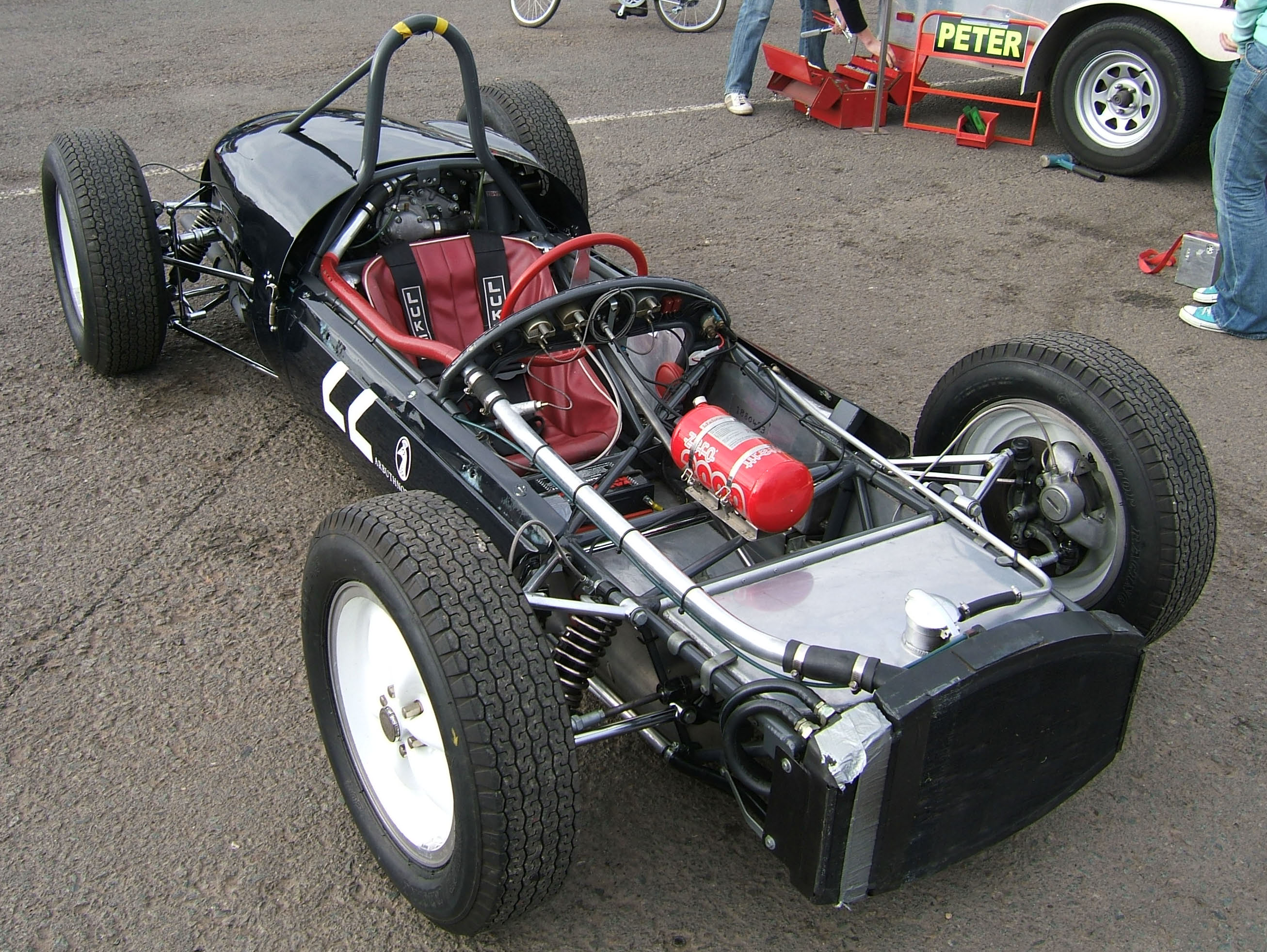
Lotus 18/21 with body removed

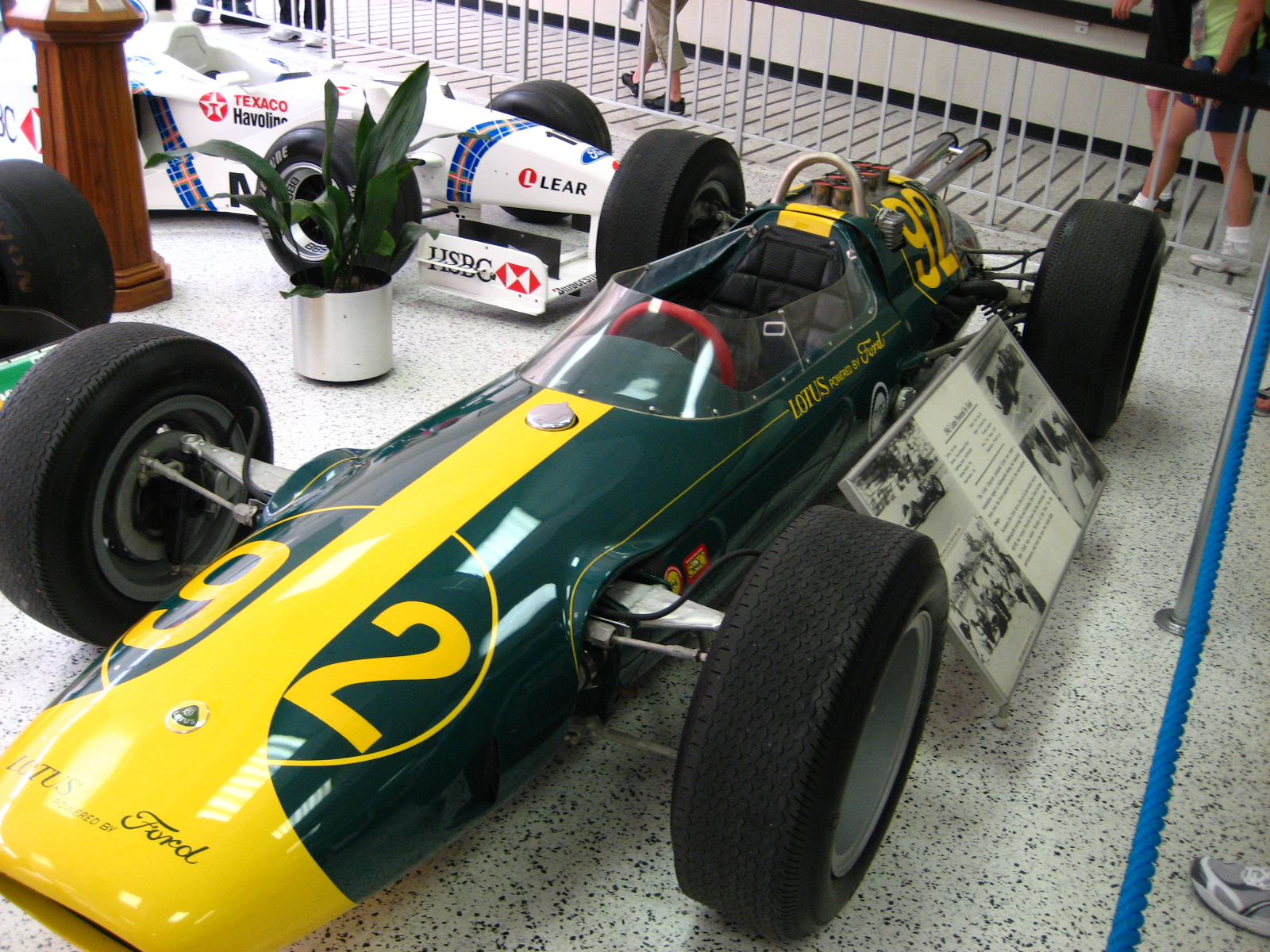
Lotus 29

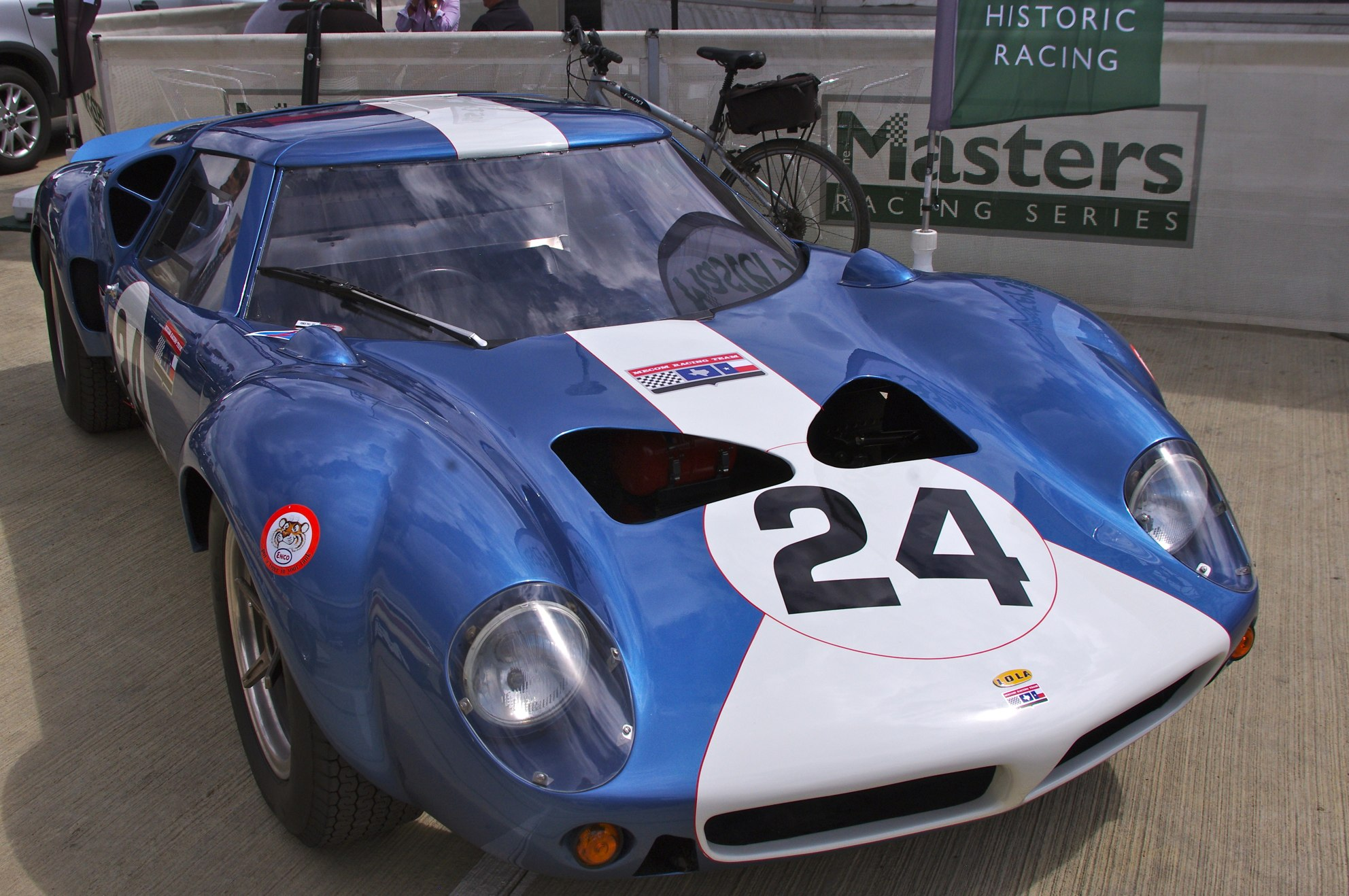
Lola Mk6

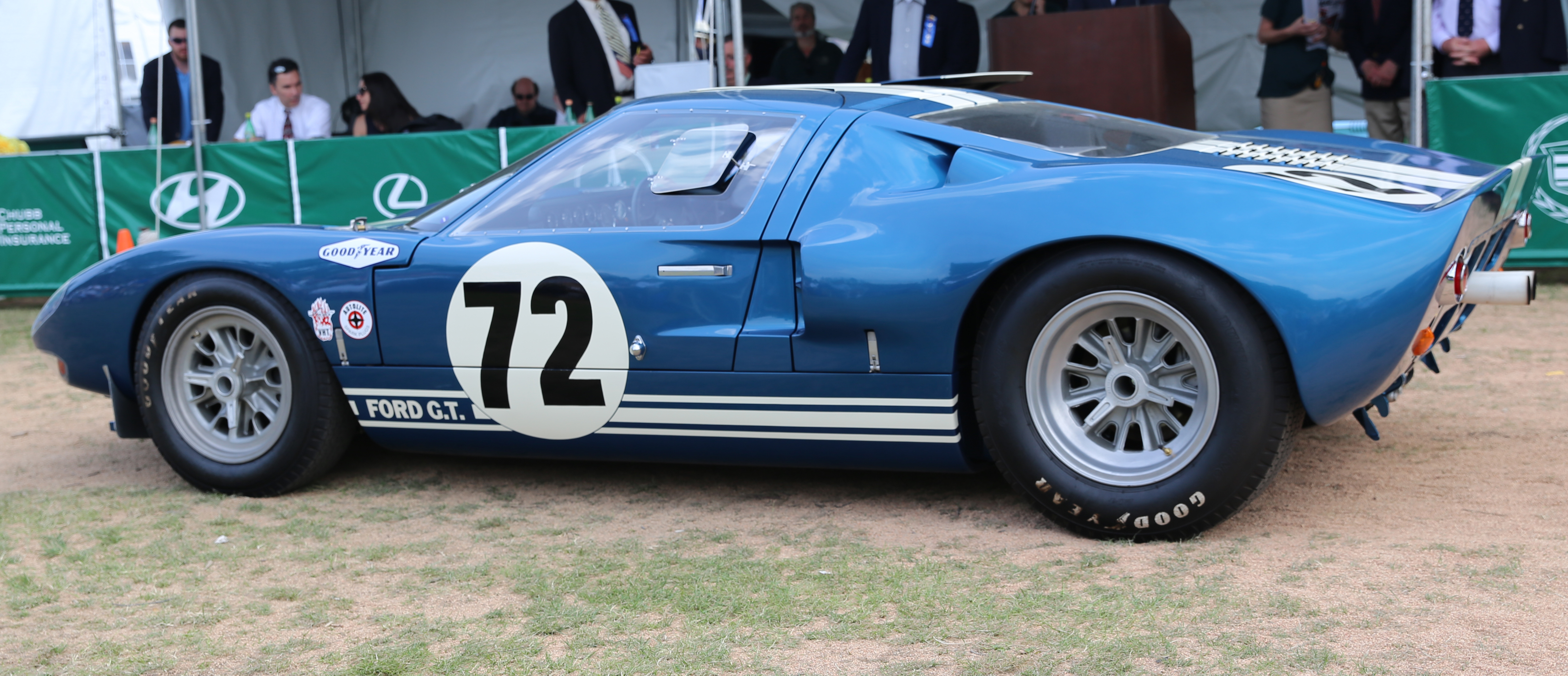
4th prototype Ford GT40

== 1980-present ==
Gianpaolo Dallara asked Colotti Trasmissioni to develop and manufacture a racing version of the transaxle for Lancia Montecarlo, which was to be Fiat Group's FIA Group 5 weapon. Equipped with a new quick-response limited-slip differential called Duo-Block, this transaxle was very successful by winning the World Endurance Championship in 1980 and 1981, and Duo-Block was patented.

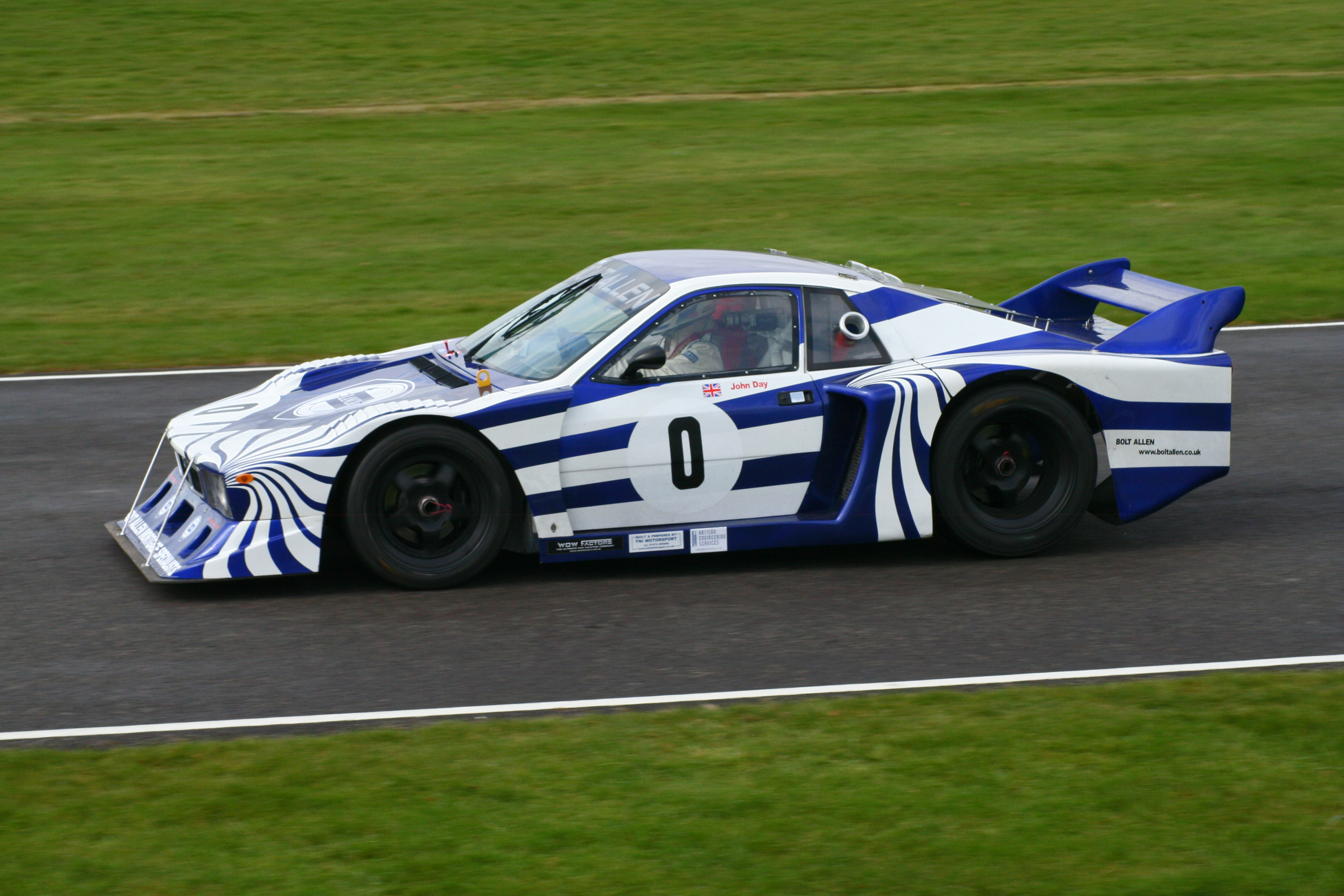
Lancia Beta Montecarlo Group 5

Colotti Trasmissioni was also active in the Rally sector, by developing a new kind of limited-slip center differential for four-wheel drive competition cars. This torque splitting/proportioning device is patented as Split-Diff.

== Ferrari 125 ==
Valerio Colotti worked for Ferrari in the late 1940s and early 1950s, and worked on engineering the chassis and transmission of their first own GP car design under Enzo Ferrari, Aurelio Lampredi, and Gioacchino Colombo. In light of this, Piero Ferrari asked Colotti Trasmissioni to build an exact replica of the Ferrari 125, with the original engine and using drawings provided by the Maranello factory. The first-ever Ferrari-built Grand Prix car had been lost, and the completed replica currently resides in Museo Ferrari in Maranello, alongside newer Ferrari F1 machines.

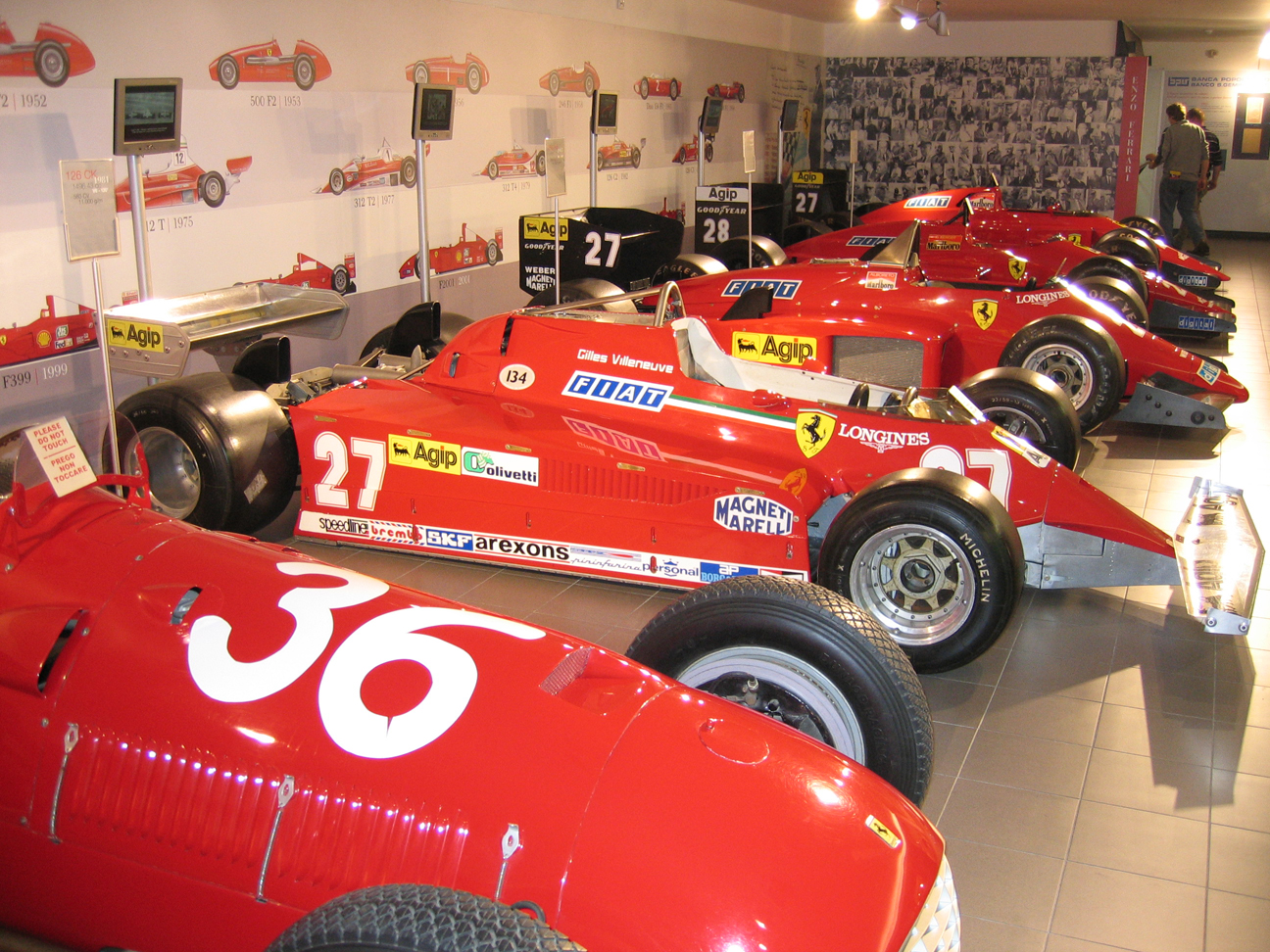
Museo Ferrari

== See also ==
- ZF Friedrichshafen
- Hewland
