= Asdrúbal Fontes Bayardo =

Uruguayan racing driver (1922–2006)

- Born: 26 December 1922; Pan de Azúcar, Uruguay
- Died: 9 July 2006 (aged 83); Montevideo, Uruguay

Formula One World Championship career
- Nationality: (Uruguay) Uruguayan
- Active years: 1959
- Team: Scuderia Centro Sud
- Entries: 1 (0 starts)
- Championships: 0
- Wins: 0
- Podiums: 0
- Career points: 0
- Pole positions: 0
- Fastest laps: 0
- First entry: 1959 French Grand Prix

Asdrúbal Esteban Fontes Bayardo, sometimes known as "Pocho" (26 December 1922, in Pan de Azúcar – 9 July 2006, in Montevideo) was a racing driver from Uruguay.

== Biography ==
During the mid to late 1950s, Fontes Bayardo participated in the fiercely competitive Argentine Formula Libre series, which was gradually evolving to be run under full Formula One regulations. He won the very first race held at Montevideo's El Pinar circuit in October 1956, with his Maserati 4CLT powered by a V8 Chevrolet engine, and he also won at Interlagos in November 1957 with the same car.

Fontes Bayardo travelled to Europe in 1959 to participate in the 1959 French Grand Prix with Scuderia Centro Sud, driving an elderly Maserati 250F, but he recorded no time and failed to qualify. He returned to South America where he continued in Formula Libre and also took part in endurance races.

In the 1960s, Fontes Bayardo was a concessionaire for General Motors in Pan de Azúcar, San Carlos and Maldonado, and was a director on the board of a company producing Opel-based pick-up trucks in Pan de Azucar under the name of "Marina". He later worked for a production agency associated with BSE (Banco de Seguros del Estado), a large Uruguayan bank corporation.

Fontes Bayardo died at his home in Montevideo in July 2006. The Piriápolis street circuit is named after him. His nephew, Cyro Fontes, continues his legacy competing in Uruguayan and Argentine touring car racing.

== Complete Formula One World Championship results ==
(key)

| Year | Entrant | Chassis | Engine | 1 | 2 | 3 | 4 | 5 | 6 | 7 | 8 | 9 | WDC | Points |
|---|---|---|---|---|---|---|---|---|---|---|---|---|---|---|
| 1959 | Scuderia Centro Sud | Maserati 250F | Maserati Straight-6 | MON | 500 | NED | FRA; DNS | GBR | GER | POR | ITA | USA | NC | 0 |

== Additional source ==
- Alfredo Parga - "Historia Deportiva del Automovilismo Argentino".
