= Tec-Mec =

Automobile manufacturer

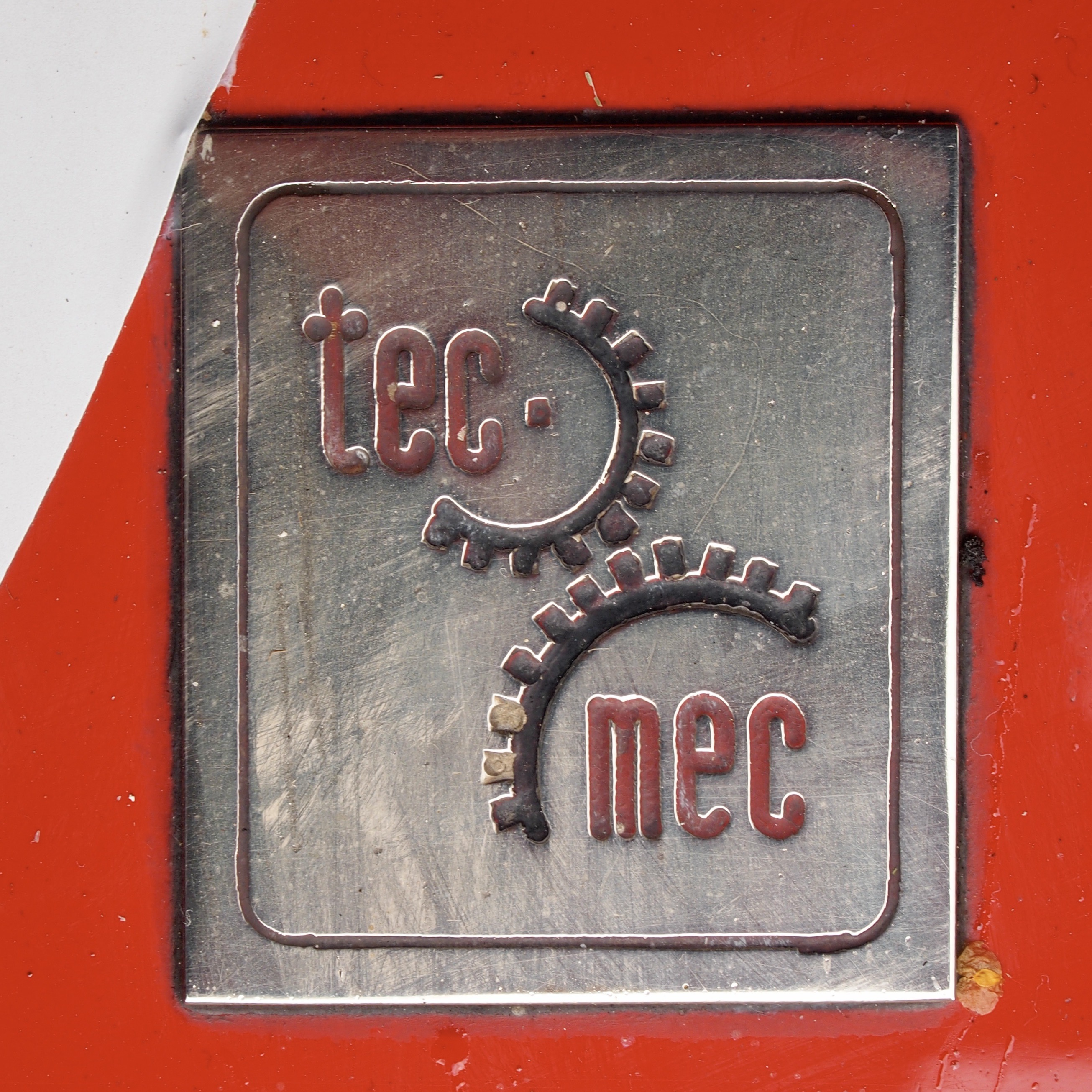
- Full name: Studio Tecnica Meccanica
- Founder(s): Valerio Colotti
- Noted drivers: (Brazil) Fritz d'Orey

Formula One World Championship career
- First entry: 1959 United States Grand Prix
- Races entered: 1
- Engines: Maserati straight-six
- Constructors' Championships: 0
- Drivers' Championships: 0
- Race victories: 0
- Podiums: 0
- Points: 0
- Pole positions: 0
- Fastest laps: 0
- Final entry: 1959 United States Grand Prix

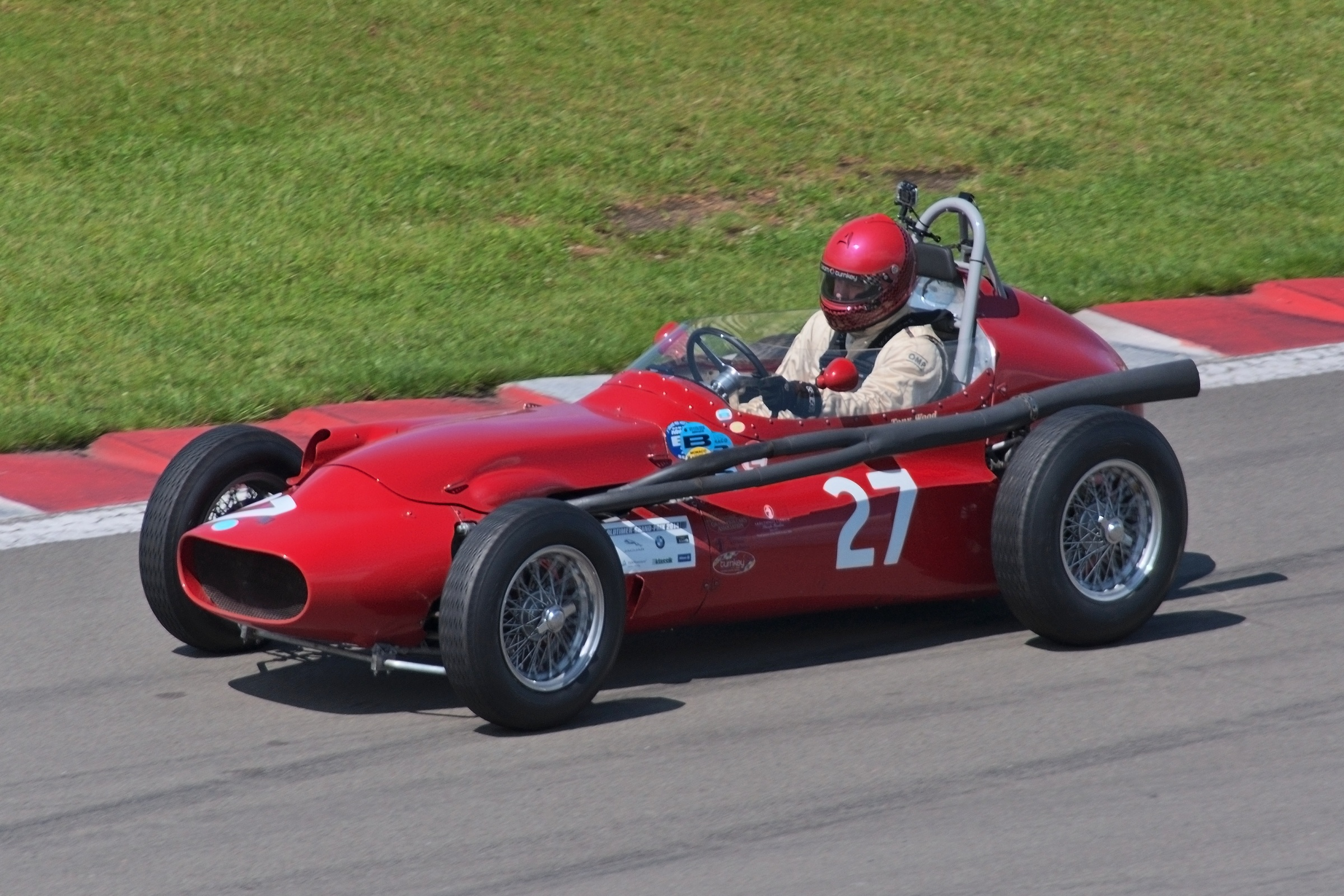
Maserati Tec-Mec F415

Tec-Mec (full name Studio Tecnica Meccanica) was a Formula One constructor from Italy. Founded by former Maserati designer Valerio Colotti in 1958, they participated in a single Grand Prix, scoring no World Championship points.

== History ==
Tec-Mec used an improved, lightened version of the Maserati 250F, named the F415. The car was upgraded by the 250F's designer, Colotti, and financed by Lloyd Casner of Camoradi International. The F415 featured a lightweight space-frame chassis, with the de Dion rear axle set-up was replaced by an independent system using a transverse leaf spring and wishbones. The drum brakes were replaced by Girling disc brakes.

The team made its single outing in the 1959 United States Grand Prix, but the car, driven by Fritz d'Orey lasted six laps before retiring, having qualified 17th on the grid ahead of only the midget racer of Rodger Ward.

Colotti sold the design studio at the end of the year to found Colotti Trasmissioni, and the company continued to produce cars for the Formula Junior series.

The Tec-Mec F415 is still currently used in historic racing, winning the Historic Grand Prix of Monaco in 2016 and 2018.

== Complete Formula One World Championship results ==
(key)

Year	Entrant	Chassis	Engine	Tyres	Driver	1	2	3	4	5	6	7	8	9	Points	WCC
1959	Camoradi	Tec-Mec F415	Maserati L6	D		MON	500	NED	FRA	GBR	GER	POR	ITA	USA	0	-
1959	Camoradi	Tec-Mec F415	Maserati L6	D	Fritz d'Orey									Ret	0	-

== See also ==
- Colotti Trasmissioni
- Valerio Colotti
