= Connaught Type C =

Formula One car (1958–1959)

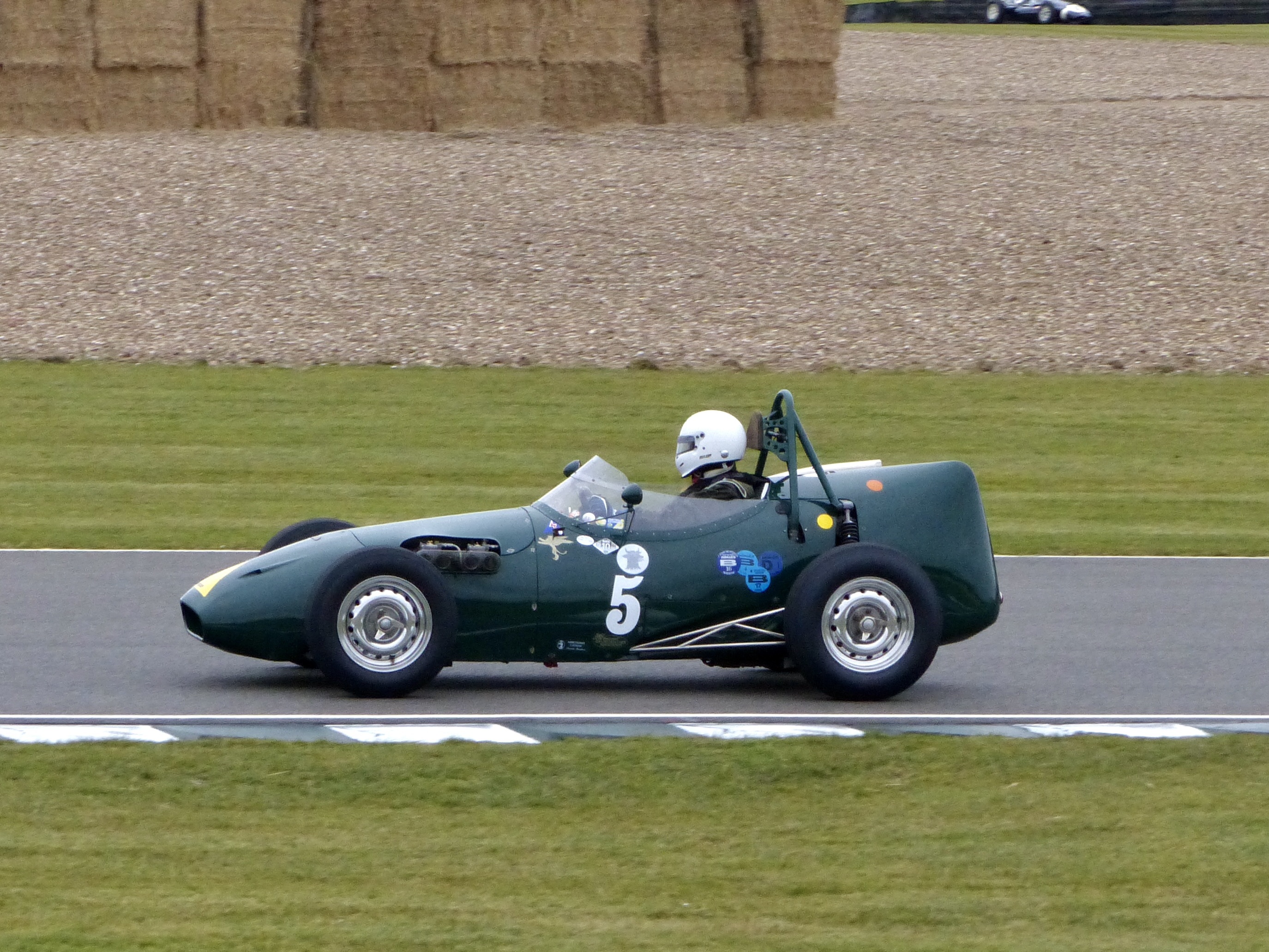
- Category: Formula One, USAC Championship Car
- Constructor: Connaught Engineering
- Designer: Rodney Clarke
- Predecessor: Connaught Type B

Technical specifications
- Chassis: Spaceframe
- Engine: Alta 2,470 cc (150.7 cu in) straight 4 naturally aspirated, front engine, longitudinally mounted
- Transmission: 4 speed manual preselector gearbox
- Tyres: D

Competition history
- Notable entrants: Connaught Engineering
- Notable drivers: (United States) Bob Said
- Debut: 1959 United States Grand Prix
- Last event: 1959 United States Grand Prix
Races	Wins	Poles	F/Laps
1	0	0	0
- Constructors' Championships: 0
- Drivers' Championships: 0
- Unless otherwise stated, all data refer to Formula One World Championship Grands Prix only.

The Connaught Type C was a racing car made by Connaught Engineering of England used in Formula One racing bin 1958 and 1959.

== Development history ==
The car was built in 1957, and was the 8th chassis built by Connaught. Its bodywork resembled that of the B-type chassis B3, known as the "Toothpaste Tube", raced by Stuart Lewis-Evans in 1957.

== Race history ==
The car was unfinished before Kenneth McAlpine sold his interest of the team, and although the chassis was put up for sale in October 1957, it did not find a buyer, so remained with the remnants of Connaught. Jack Fairman and Bruce Halford tested the completed car at Silverstone and Goodwood respectively in 1958, but its front engine configuration put off any potential buyers.

Amateur racer Bob Said obtained an entry for the 1959 United States Grand Prix, on condition that he obtained a suitable car; at the same time, Paul Emery, who had been acting as a factotum in relation to selling the Connaughts, was considering a possible sale of the Type C in the States, so the two came to an arrangement and Emery sent the C Type over for Said. Delays in transit prevented the car from significant practice, and, on the first lap of the race, a grabbing brake sent Said spinning off into retirement.

The C Type had an unexpected afterlife when three members of the 750 Motor Club - Pierre de Villiers, Harry Worrall, and Tony Densham - entered it in the 1962 Indianapolis 500 as the De Villiers Special, with new bodywork and two of the gear speeds removed. However driver Jack Fairman was unable to pass the 135mph phase of the rookie test in the car, and although Bill Cheesbourg briefly tried the car, no qualifying attempt was made.
