= Valerio Colotti =

Italian automotive engineer (1925–2008)

Valerio Colotti (19 April 1925 – 19 January 2008) was an Italian automotive engineer, known for his early work with Ferrari and Maserati chassis and transmission systems.

Born in Modena, Colotti joined Ferrari in 1948, working under Aurelio Lampredi, followed by employment with Maserati (1953–1957), until the company dropped factory works racing. In 1958 he started his own company, known as Tec-Mec (Studio Tecnica Meccanica). Tec-Mec, assisted by Giorgio Scarlatti, built the tipo F/415 Formula One car, mostly based on the Maserati 250F, in which Colotti had been deeply involved. The car raced only at the 1959 USA Grand Prix, where driver Fritz d'Orey was forced to retire after qualifying 17th. Colotti collaborated also with Behra-Porsche (1959), Stirling Moss's Cooper T51 and Scirocco-Powell. Colotti's cooperation with Alf Francis lead to the widely used in competition Colotti-Francis gearbox systems. With Wolfgang von Trips he designed the Trips-Colotti-Auto Union (TCA).

Colotti's company is now called Colotti Trasmissioni and is run by his son Marco after his brother Paolo (1956–2016) died.
