= Alfredo Parga =

Argentine writer and journalist (1924–2004)

Alfredo Parga (11 December 1924 in Buenos Aires – 2 June 2004) was an Argentine writer and journalist linked to motor racing. He published articles on Spanish Civil War and biographical books on Juan Manuel Fangio and Carlos Alberto Reutemann. Also a columnist of sports magazines and of Buenos Aires' Diario La Nación. As a radio journalist, he took part of 'Sport 80' programme (Radio Mitre) and as a host of 'Otro automovilismo' broadcast on Radio Belgrano. He was awarded a 'Lobo de mar' prize in 1996 and he was a recipient of Konex Foundation diploma in 1997.

== Works ==
- 'Los días de Reutemann', Ediciones CEAC.
- 'Fangio a secas', Revista Corsa.
- 'Fórmula 1', La Nación.
- 'Historia de una pasión', Editorial Atlántida
- 'Historia deportiva del automovilismo argentino', La Nación.
