= Fritz d'Orey =

Brazilian racing driver (1938–2020)

- Born: Frederico José Carlos Themudo d'Orey; March 25, 1938; São Paulo, Brazil
- Died: August 31, 2020 (aged 82); Cascais e Estoril, Cascais, Portugal

Formula One World Championship career
- Nationality: (Brazil) Brazilian
- Active years: 1959
- Team(s): Tec-Mec; Non-works Maserati
- Entries: 3
- Championships: 0
- Wins: 0
- Podiums: 0
- Career points: 0
- Pole positions: 0
- Fastest laps: 0
- First entry: 1959 French Grand Prix
- Last entry: 1959 United States Grand Prix

Frederico José Carlos Themudo "Fritz" d'Orey (25 March 1938 – 31 August 2020) was a Brazilian racing driver of German and Portuguese descent. He participated in three Formula One World Championship Grands Prix, debuting on 5 July 1959. He scored no championship points.

== Complete Formula One World Championship results ==
(key)

Year	Entrant	Chassis	Engine	1	2	3	4	5	6	7	8	9	WDC	Points
1959	Scuderia Centro Sud	Maserati 250F	Maserati Straight-6	MON	500	NED	FRA; 10	GBR; Ret	GER; DNA	POR; DNA	ITA		NC	0
1959	Camoradi USA	Tec-Mec Maserati 250F	Maserati Straight-6									USA; Ret	NC	0
