= 1959 French Grand Prix =

| ← Previous race | Next race → |
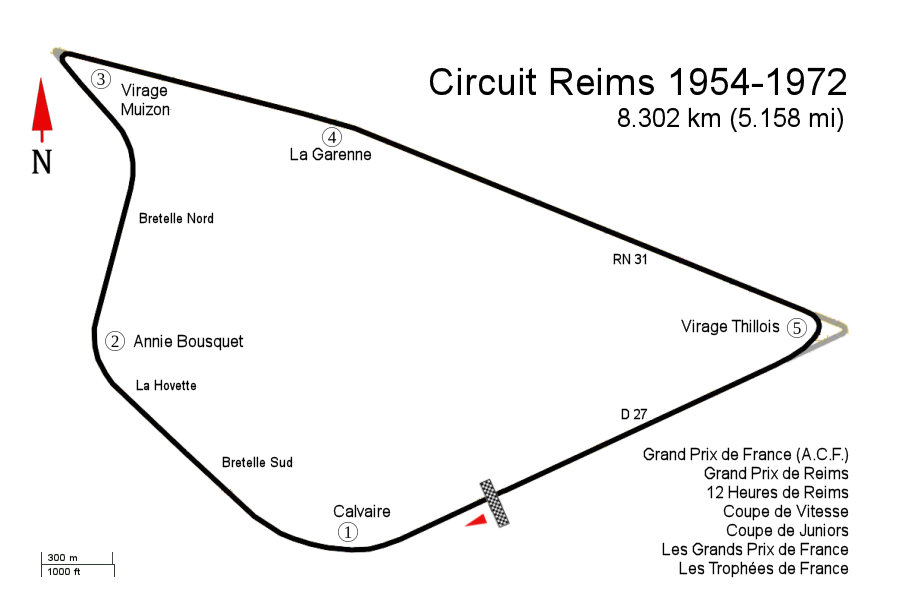
- Reims layout

Race details
- Date: 5 July 1959
- Official name: XLV Grand Prix de l'ACF
- Location: Reims circuit, Reims, France
- Course: Temporary road course
- Course length: 8.348 km (5.187 miles)
- Distance: 50 laps, 417.383 km (259.350 miles)
- Weather: Hot, dry

Pole position
| Driver | (United Kingdom) Tony Brooks | Ferrari |
- Time: 2:19.4

Fastest lap
| Driver | (United Kingdom) Stirling Moss | BRM |
- Time: 2:22.8

Podium
| First | (United Kingdom) Tony Brooks | Ferrari |
| Second | (United States) Phil Hill | Ferrari |
| Third | (Australia) Jack Brabham | Cooper-Climax |

The 1959 French Grand Prix was a Formula One motor race held at Reims on 5 July 1959. It was race 4 of 9 in the 1959 World Championship of Drivers and race 3 of 8 in the 1959 International Cup for Formula One Manufacturers. It was the 37th French Grand Prix and the twelfth to be held at the Reims highway circuit and the fourth to be held on the longer and faster 8.348 km layout. The race was held over 50 laps of the eight kilometre circuit for a race distance of 417 kilometres.

The race was won by British driver Tony Brooks driving a Ferrari 246 F1. Brooks dominated the race, leading all 50 laps and winning by 27 seconds over his American Scuderia Ferrari teammate Phil Hill. Brooks said after the race a sticking throttle in the closing laps made it more difficult than the result seemed. Australian driver Jack Brabham was over a minute behind in third position driving a Cooper T51 for the factory Cooper racing team after stopping to get new goggles as the circuit broke up.

Race day was very hot, to the point where the bitumen started to melt. Race cars were dislodging aggregate stones as the race went on causing American Masten Gregory to retire with cuts to his face, and Graham Hill to retire his Lotus 16 after his radiator was holed.

Stirling Moss was disqualified from eighth position after receiving a push-start in his British Racing Partnership entered BRM P25. Moss had pushed his car hard trying to overcome a failing gearbox, claiming a new lap record. Jean Behra too pushed hard in his Ferrari 246 F1, climbing into third racing against no less than four teammates at this race. Behra's engine broke under his charge and the Frenchman had a heated discussion with team manager Romolo Tavoni which ended with Behra punching Tavoni and a patron at a restaurant. It would be Behra's last race for Ferrari, with the Frenchman being fired for the assault.

The win was the first of the season for Scuderia Ferrari and moved Brooks into second place overall, five points behind Brabham. Hill's second position moved him into third in the championship.

== Classification ==
=== Qualifying ===
| Pos | No | Driver | Constructor | Time | Gap |
|---|---|---|---|---|---|
| 1 | 24 | (United Kingdom) Tony Brooks | Ferrari | 2:19.4 | — |
| 2 | 8 | (Australia) Jack Brabham | Cooper-Climax | 2:19.7 | +0.3 |
| 3 | 26 | (United States) Phil Hill | Ferrari | 2:19.8 | +0.4 |
| 4 | 2 | (United Kingdom) Stirling Moss | BRM | 2:19.9 | +0.5 |
| 5 | 30 | (France) Jean Behra | Ferrari | 2:20.2 | +0.8 |
| 6 | 4 | (Sweden) Jo Bonnier | BRM | 2:20.6 | +1.2 |
| 7 | 10 | (United States) Masten Gregory | Cooper-Climax | 2:20.8 | +1.4 |
| 8 | 14 | (France) Maurice Trintignant | Cooper-Climax | 2:21.3 | +1.9 |
| 9 | 6 | (United States) Harry Schell | BRM | 2:21.5 | +2.1 |
| 10 | 12 | (New Zealand) Bruce McLaren | Cooper-Climax | 2:21.5 | +2.1 |
| 11 | 22 | (Belgium) Olivier Gendebien | Ferrari | 2:21.5 | +2.1 |
| 12 | 28 | (United States) Dan Gurney | Ferrari | 2:21.9 | +2.5 |
| 13 | 44 | (United Kingdom) Ron Flockhart | BRM | 2:23.4 | +4.0 |
| 14 | 32 | (United Kingdom) Graham Hill | Lotus-Climax | 2:23.7 | +4.3 |
| 15 | 34 | (United Kingdom) Innes Ireland | Lotus-Climax | 2:24.2 | +4.8 |
| 16 | 16 | (United Kingdom) Roy Salvadori | Cooper-Maserati | 2:26.4 | +7.0 |
| 17 | 20 | (United Kingdom) Colin Davis | Cooper-Maserati | 2:32.3 | +12.9 |
| 18 | 38 | (Brazil) Fritz d'Orey | Maserati | 2:34.0 | +14.6 |
| 19 | 18 | (United Kingdom) Ian Burgess | Cooper-Maserati | 2:35.2 | +15.8 |
| 20 | 42 | (Netherlands) Carel Godin de Beaufort | Maserati | 2:35.4 | +16.0 |
| 21 | 40 | (Italy) Giorgio Scarlatti | Maserati | 2:35.6 | +16.2 |
| DNS | 36 | (Uruguay) Asdrúbal Fontes Bayardo | Maserati | | |

=== Race ===
| Pos | No | Driver | Constructor | Laps | Time/Retired | Grid | Points |
|---|---|---|---|---|---|---|---|
| 1 | 24 | (United Kingdom) Tony Brooks | Ferrari | 50 | 2:01:26.5 | 1 | 8 |
| 2 | 26 | (United States) Phil Hill | Ferrari | 50 | + 27.5 | 3 | 6 |
| 3 | 8 | (Australia) Jack Brabham | Cooper-Climax | 50 | + 1:37.7 | 2 | 4 |
| 4 | 22 | (Belgium) Olivier Gendebien | Ferrari | 50 | + 1:47.5 | 11 | 3 |
| 5 | 12 | (New Zealand) Bruce McLaren | Cooper-Climax | 50 | + 1:47.7 | 10 | 2 |
| 6 | 44 | (United Kingdom) Ron Flockhart | BRM | 50 | + 2:05.7 | 13 | |
| 7 | 6 | (United States) Harry Schell | BRM | 47 | + 3 Laps | 9 | |
| 8 | 40 | (Italy) Giorgio Scarlatti | Maserati | 41 | + 9 Laps | 21 | |
| 9 | 42 | (Netherlands) Carel Godin de Beaufort | Maserati | 40 | + 10 Laps | 20 | |
| 10 | 38 | (Brazil) Fritz d'Orey | Maserati | 40 | + 10 Laps | 18 | |
| 11 | 14 | (France) Maurice Trintignant | Cooper-Climax | 36 | + 14 Laps | 8 | |
| DSQ | 2 | (United Kingdom) Stirling Moss | BRM | 42 | Push start | 4 | 1^{1} |
| Ret | 30 | (France) Jean Behra | Ferrari | 31 | Engine | 5 | |
| Ret | 16 | (United Kingdom) Roy Salvadori | Cooper-Maserati | 20 | Engine | 16 | |
| Ret | 28 | (United States) Dan Gurney | Ferrari | 19 | Radiator | 12 | |
| Ret | 34 | (United Kingdom) Innes Ireland | Lotus-Climax | 14 | Wheel | 15 | |
| Ret | 18 | (United Kingdom) Ian Burgess | Cooper-Maserati | 13 | Engine | 19 | |
| Ret | 10 | (United States) Masten Gregory | Cooper-Climax | 8 | Physical | 7 | |
| Ret | 32 | (United Kingdom) Graham Hill | Lotus-Climax | 7 | Radiator | 14 | |
| Ret | 20 | (United Kingdom) Colin Davis | Cooper-Maserati | 7 | Oil Leak | 17 | |
| Ret | 4 | (Sweden) Jo Bonnier | BRM | 6 | Engine | 6 | |
| DNS | 36 | (Uruguay) Asdrúbal Fontes Bayardo | Maserati | | | | |

Notes

- ^1 – 1 point for fastest lap

== Notes ==
- This was the first fastest lap for a BRM.
- This was Ferrari's 5th Formula One World Championship Grand Prix win of a French Grand Prix, both as a constructor and an engine supplier.

== Championship standings after the race ==
Drivers' Championship standings

| | Pos | Driver | Points |
|---|---|---|---|
| | 1 | (Australia) Jack Brabham | 19 |
| 2 | 2 | (United Kingdom) Tony Brooks | 14 |
| 6 | 3 | (United States) Phil Hill | 9 |
| 2 | 4 | (Sweden) Joakim Bonnier | 8 |
| 2 | 5 | (United States) Rodger Ward | 8 |

Constructors' Championship standings

| | Pos | Constructor | Points |
|---|---|---|---|
| | 1 | (United Kingdom) Cooper-Climax | 18 |
| 1 | 2 | (Italy) Ferrari | 16 |
| 1 | 3 | (United Kingdom) BRM | 8 |
| | 4 | (United Kingdom) Lotus-Climax | 3 |

- Notes: Only the top five positions are included for both sets of standings.

| Previous race: 1959 Dutch Grand Prix | FIA Formula One World Championship; 1959 season | Next race: 1959 British Grand Prix |
| Previous race: 1958 French Grand Prix | French Grand Prix | Next race: 1960 French Grand Prix |
| Previous race: 1958 Belgian Grand Prix | European Grand Prix (Designated European Grand Prix) | Next race: 1960 Italian Grand Prix |
