= 1959 United States Grand Prix =

← Previous race	Next race →

Race details
- Date: December 12, 1959
- Official name: II Grand Prix of the United States
- Location: Sebring International Raceway; Sebring, Florida
- Course: Former Military Airbase
- Course length: 8.36 km (5.2 miles)
- Distance: 42 laps, 351 km (218 miles)
- Weather: Sunny with temperatures reaching up to 25 °C (77 °F); Winds speeds up to 25.93 km/h (16.11 mph)

Pole position
Driver	(United Kingdom) Stirling Moss	Cooper-Climax
- Time: 3:00.0

Fastest lap
Driver	(France) Maurice Trintignant	Cooper-Climax
- Time: 3:05.0 on lap 39

Podium
First	(New Zealand) Bruce McLaren	Cooper-Climax
Second	(France) Maurice Trintignant	Cooper-Climax
Third	(United Kingdom) Tony Brooks	Ferrari

The 1959 United States Grand Prix was a Formula One motor race held on December 12, 1959, at Sebring International Raceway in Sebring, Florida. It was the last of 9 races in the 1959 World Championship of Drivers and the 8th and final in the 1959 International Cup for Formula One Manufacturers. It was the second United States Grand Prix (ninth including the American Grand Prize races from 1908 to 1916), and the only occasion the race was held at the home of the 12 Hours of Sebring endurance sports car race, the Sebring International Raceway in Florida. The race was held over 42 laps of the 8.36-kilometre circuit for a total race distance of 351 kilometres.

The race was won by New Zealander Bruce McLaren driving a Cooper T51 for the works Cooper team, the first win for a New Zealand-born driver. McLaren won by six-tenths of a second over French driver Maurice Trintignant driving a Rob Walker Racing Team-entered Cooper T51. British driver Tony Brooks finished third in his Ferrari Dino 246. Championship points leader Australian Jack Brabham ran out of fuel on the last lap and pushed his Cooper T51 across the line to finish fourth. Brooks's third-place finish clinched the title for Brabham. It was the first of three world championships for Brabham, and the first for an Australian, for Cooper, and for a rear-engined car.

McLaren's win at 22 years, 3 months and 12 days saw him become the youngest-ever Grand Prix winner, a record that would stand for over 40 years. However, he was not the youngest to win a World Championship race. That record was held by American driver Troy Ruttman who had won the 1952 Indianapolis 500 when aged 22 years, 2 months and 19 days. (Note: The Indianapolis 500 was included as a round of the World Championship between 1950 and 1960, but it was not considered a Grand Prix.)

This was the last race until the 1994 Monaco Grand Prix that no former world champions were in the field. This was also the last race where a bonus point for fastest lap would be awarded until the 2019 Australian Grand Prix.

== Background ==
For the first time since 1951, three drivers were in contention for the title going into the final race. A win would seal it for Brabham, or just finishing in front of Stirling Moss and Brooks. Moss needed to finish first or second and ahead of Brabham, while for Brooks winning would not necessarily be enough.

- Brabham (31 points) needed either
  - First
  - Second, with Moss behind him
  - Third with fastest lap and Moss second or lower
  - Brooks second or lower and Moss third or lower
- Moss (25.5 points) needed either
  - First
  - Second with Brabham behind him, and Brooks first without fastest lap or lower
  - Second with fastest lap, with Brabham behind him
- Brooks (23 points) needed either
  - First with fastest lap and Brabham third or lower
  - First, with Moss and Brabham third or lower

== Summary ==
Russian-born Alec Ulmann's dream of an American Grand Prix was realized in December, 1959 when 19 entries, including six American drivers, arrived in Florida for the final World Championship event of the season. Originally scheduled as the year's opening round, the now season-concluding Sebring race saw the Championship down to Cooper versus Ferrari. Australian Jack Brabham led for Cooper with 31 points to 25.5 for Stirling Moss, also in a Cooper, and 23 for Ferrari driver Tony Brooks.

The field featured works Coopers for Brabham and 22-year-old Bruce McLaren of New Zealand; blue Rob Walker-entered Coopers for Moss and Frenchman Maurice Trintignant; four Ferraris — three in Italian red for Englishmen Brooks and Cliff Allison, and German Wolfgang von Trips; one in American white and blue for Phil Hill; front-engined Lotuses for Innes Ireland and Alan Stacey; and, incomprehensibly for the European road-racing elite, the number 1 Kurtis-Offy midget of USAC National Champion Rodger Ward, the only American-built and American-driven entry.

Ward's car had an underpowered engine (1.7 liters to 2.5 for the F1 cars), separate gear-change levers for the two-speed gearbox and two-speed rear end, and an outboard handbrake. Ward explained how his participation in the race came about by saying, "Ullman called me up and invited me to race in the Grand Prix. He offered me some money, and I was in the habit of accepting money, so I told him I'd bring the midget."

The night before practice began, Cooper Team Manager John Cooper, and his drivers Jack Brabham and Bruce McLaren, came across Ward at the hotel in Sebring. Ward, who had won the Indy 500 that year and would win it again in 1962, told the Cooper team members he was in Sebring to drive a dirt track car.

"In the Grand Prix?", Brabham asked, astonished.

"Sure. And have you guys got a surprise waiting for you! Why, on every turn I'll blow you right off the road!" Ward gushed.

The Cooper team soon realized they could not explain things to Ward. He insisted, "I know what a Midget can do and I know it can take a corner faster than any of those sports cars you have in Europe. You might be faster on the straights, but when it comes to turns you just won't have a chance. Sebring's a lot of turns, isn't it?"

Well, to the Europeans' amazement, Ward's car made it through the technical scrutineering, perhaps a tribute to his Indianapolis reputation, but during the first practice lap, Bruce McLaren and Jack Brabham arrived at the first turn in their Coopers about the same time as Ward. The rear-engined cars sped through the turn, while Ward seemed to almost come to a stop. Afterward, Ward shook his head and said, "I've got to hand it to you. Those European buggies sure take corners fast!"

— John Cooper, The Grand Prix Carpetbaggers

Qualifying ended with Moss, Brabham and Brooks on the front row, but, overnight, American Harry Schell was given third position, next to Moss and Brabham. The 3:05.2 lap that got Schell on the front row apparently had come at the tail end of the session, and had gone unnoticed by almost everyone; his best time previously had been 3:11.2, good enough for 11th.

Protests ensued from nearly every other team, most vociferously Ferrari, whose man, Brooks, was displaced on the front row. The shouting match raged even as "The Star-Spangled Banner" was being sung, but when it was through, Schell started from third place.

What had really happened with Schell did not come out until after the race. At Sebring, just beyond the MG bridge and before the esses was a sharp right turn that apparently led nowhere. Schell found, however, that it connected with the end of the Warehouse Straight, bypassing the entire straight and the Warehouse Hairpin. He had secretly cut across and come back on the course during a lull in the traffic – and cut six seconds off his time. It didn't help him in the race, however; he was eighth after the first lap and retired after only six.

Moss led the race from the start and built a gap of ten seconds over Brabham, but after only five laps he retired with a broken gearbox. Already out of the running for the title was Brooks, who had been bumped off the front row by Schell's qualifying ruse. Brooks was rammed from behind by teammate von Trips in the first turn, and pitted to examine the damage. The stop cost him two minutes, and proved to be unnecessary. Though he rejoined to drive a sensational race and finish third, he never had a realistic shot at Brabham.

Brabham took the lead from Moss while his teammate McLaren followed in second for most of the race. Midway through, with half the field out due to mechanical problems, Brabham slowed to allow McLaren to close up to him, and Trintignant's Rob Walker Cooper began taking huge bites off their lead, as his pit crew kept him informed of his position.

As the last lap began, Trintignant was only four seconds behind the two leaders. On the long airport straight, two turns from the finish, Brabham's car began to sputter, and it rolled to a halt 400 yards from the line on the uphill front straight, out of gas. He had refused to follow Team Manager Cooper's exhortations to start the race on full tanks, hoping instead to find more speed from a lighter car. McLaren, surprised to see Brabham slowing, lifted his foot and slowed as well. Brabham waved him on frantically, and McLaren resumed speed just soon enough to hold his lead through the last turn and cross the line less than a second ahead of Trintignant, who had set the race's fastest lap only three laps from the end. This would be the last Grand Prix in which Formula One awarded a point for the fastest lap until the 2019 Australian Grand Prix 60 years later.

Brabham was also passed by Brooks for third place, but the final three cars still running were several laps behind. The rules required that he finish without assistance, so he got out and pushed his car up the hill to finish fourth and earn his first World Drivers' Championship, the first for an Australian driver. Cooper also claimed its first Constructors' Championship, the first for a rear-engined car. Brooks's third place gave Ferrari second place in the Constructors' Championship; Innes Ireland was fifth, three laps down in his Lotus, and Wolfgang von Trips ended up sixth after his Ferrari's engine gave way with four laps to go. With his victory, McLaren became the youngest ever Grand Prix winner at age 22 years, 104 days. In addition to his prize money, he also won several acres of land adjoining Sebring Lake.

Despite the exciting finish of the race and the championship, however, the United States Grand Prix at Sebring was a financial disaster. The crowd was half the size of that year's 12 Hours of Sebring sports car race, and after distributing the $15,000 purse, including a huge $6,000 winner's share, Alec Ulmann just about broke even. The next year, he would try again, on the opposite coast, in Riverside, California.

== Classification ==
=== Qualifying ===
Pos	No	Driver	Constructor	Time	Gap
1	7	(United Kingdom) Stirling Moss	Cooper-Climax	3:00.0	—
2	8	(Australia) Jack Brabham	Cooper-Climax	3:03.0	+3.0
3	19	(United States) Harry Schell	Cooper-Climax	3:05.2	+5.2
4	2	(United Kingdom) Tony Brooks	Ferrari	3:05.9	+5.9
5	6	(France) Maurice Trintignant	Cooper-Climax	3:06.0	+6.0
6	4	(Germany) Wolfgang von Trips	Ferrari	3:06.2	+6.2
7	3	(United Kingdom) Cliff Allison	Ferrari	3:06.8	+6.8
8	5	(United States) Phil Hill	Ferrari	3:07.2	+7.2
9	10	(United Kingdom) Innes Ireland	Lotus-Climax	3:08.2	+8.2
10	9	(New Zealand) Bruce McLaren	Cooper-Climax	3:08.6	+8.6
11	12	(United Kingdom) Roy Salvadori	Cooper-Maserati	3:12.0	+12.0
12	11	(United Kingdom) Alan Stacey	Lotus-Climax	3:13.8	+13.8
13	18	(United States) Bob Said	Connaught-Alta	3:27.3	+27.3
14	14	(Argentina) Alejandro de Tomaso	Cooper-Osca	3:28.0	+28.0
15	16	(United States) George Constantine	Cooper-Climax	3:30.6	+30.6
16	17	(United States) Harry Blanchard	Porsche	3:32.7	+32.7
17	15	(Brazil) Fritz d'Orey	Tec-Mec-Maserati	3:33.4	+33.4
18	22	(United States) Phil Cade	Maserati	3:39.0	+39.0
19	1	(United States) Rodger Ward	Kurtis Kraft-Offenhauser	3:43.8	+43.8

=== Race ===
Pos	No	Driver	Constructor	Laps	Time/Retired	Grid	Points
1	9	(New Zealand) Bruce McLaren	Cooper-Climax	42	2:12:35.7	10	8
2	6	(France) Maurice Trintignant	Cooper-Climax	42	+0.6	5	7^{1}
3	2	(United Kingdom) Tony Brooks	Ferrari	42	+3:00.9	4	4
4	8	(Australia) Jack Brabham	Cooper-Climax	42	+4:57.3	2	3
5	10	(United Kingdom) Innes Ireland	Lotus-Climax	39	+3 laps	9	2
6	4	(Germany) Wolfgang von Trips	Ferrari	38	Engine	6	
7	17	(United States) Harry Blanchard	Porsche	38	+4 laps	16	
Ret	3	(United Kingdom) Cliff Allison	Ferrari	23	Clutch	7	
Ret	12	(United Kingdom) Roy Salvadori	Cooper-Maserati	23	Transmission	11	
Ret	1	(United States) Rodger Ward	Kurtis Kraft-Offenhauser	20	Clutch	19	
Ret	14	(Argentina) Alejandro de Tomaso	Cooper-Osca	13	Brakes	14	
Ret	5	(United States) Phil Hill	Ferrari	8	Clutch	8	
Ret	15	(Brazil) Fritz d'Orey	Tec-Mec-Maserati	6	Oil leak	17	
Ret	7	(United Kingdom) Stirling Moss	Cooper-Climax	5	Transmission	1	
Ret	19	(United States) Harry Schell	Cooper-Climax	5	Clutch	3	
Ret	16	(United States) George Constantine	Cooper-Climax	5	Overheating	15	
Ret	11	(United Kingdom) Alan Stacey	Lotus-Climax	2	Clutch	12	
Ret	18	(United States) Bob Said	Connaught-Alta	0	Accident	13	
DNS	22	(United States) Phil Cade	Maserati			18	

Notes

- ^1 – Includes 1 point for fastest lap

== Additional information ==
- This was the Formula One World Championship debut for American drivers Bob Said, George Constantine, Harry Blanchard and Phil Cade, and Italian constructor Tec-Mec.
- Excluding the Indianapolis 500 races, it was also the debut for an American constructor (Kurtis Kraft) and an American engine supplier (Offenhauser) in the Formula One World Championship.

== Final Championship standings ==
- **Bold text** indicates the World Champions.

Drivers' Championship standings

	Pos	Driver	Points
	1	(Australia) **Jack Brabham**	31 (34)
1	2	(United Kingdom) Tony Brooks	27
1	3	(United Kingdom) Stirling Moss	25.5
	4	(United States) Phil Hill	20
1	5	(France) Maurice Trintignant	19

Constructors' Championship standings

Pos	Constructor	Points
1	(United Kingdom) **Cooper-Climax**	40 (53)
2	(Italy) Ferrari	32 (38)
3	(United Kingdom) BRM	18
4	(United Kingdom) Lotus-Climax	5

- Notes: Only the top five positions are included for both sets of standings. Only the best 5 results counted towards each championship. Numbers without parentheses are championship points; numbers in parentheses are total points scored.

== Notes ==
Previous race: 1959 Italian Grand Prix	FIA Formula One World Championship; 1959 season	Next race: 1960 Argentine Grand Prix
Previous race: 1958 United States Grand Prix	United States Grand Prix	Next race: 1960 United States Grand Prix
